= George Slee =

English wool merchant and clothier

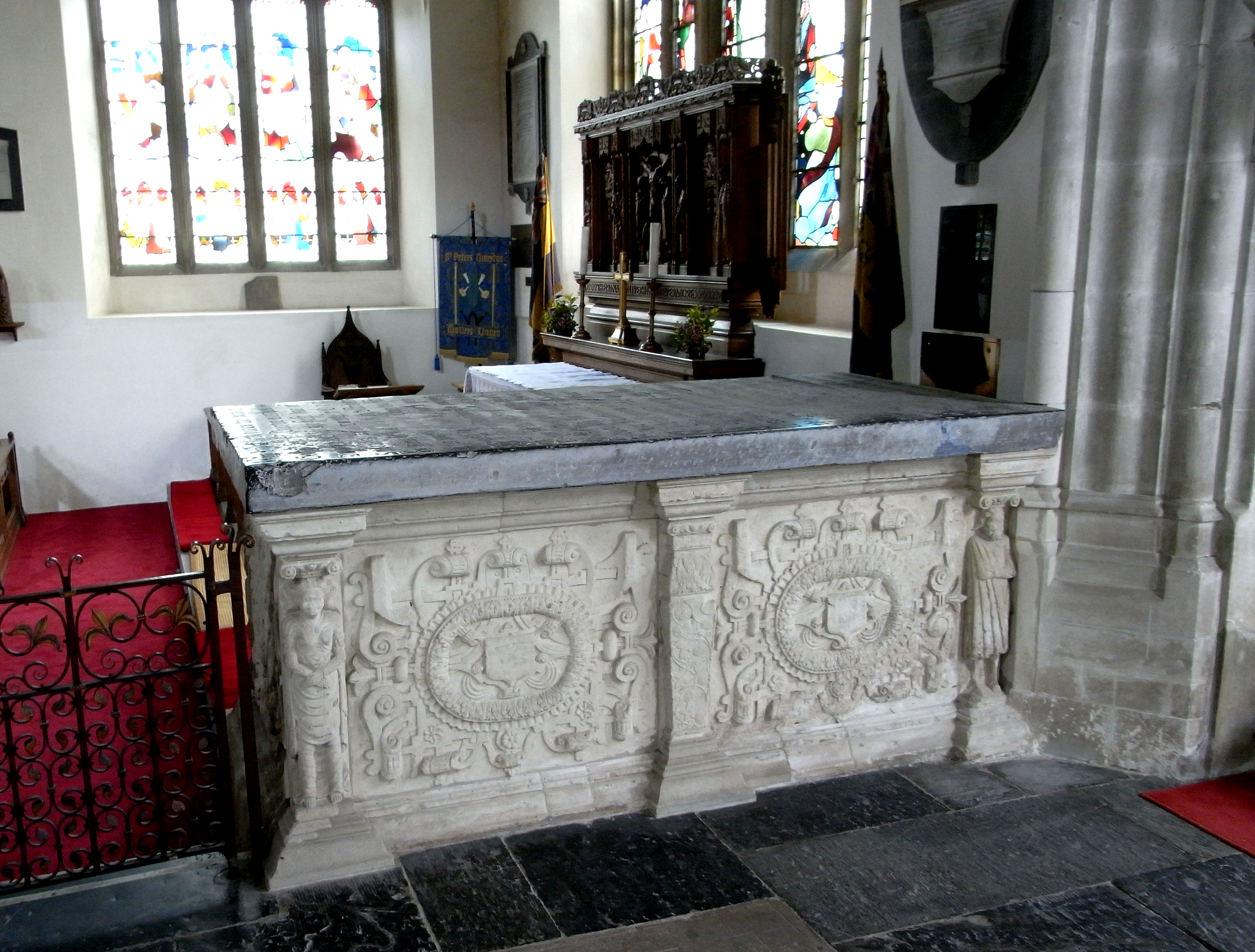
Chest tomb of George Slee, St Peter's Church, Tiverton, decorated with strapwork and Caryatids

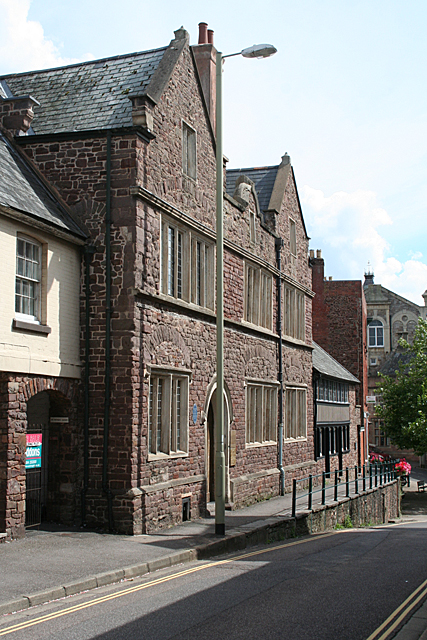
Great House, Peter Street, Tiverton, residence of George Slee, with Slee's Almshouses adjoining beyond

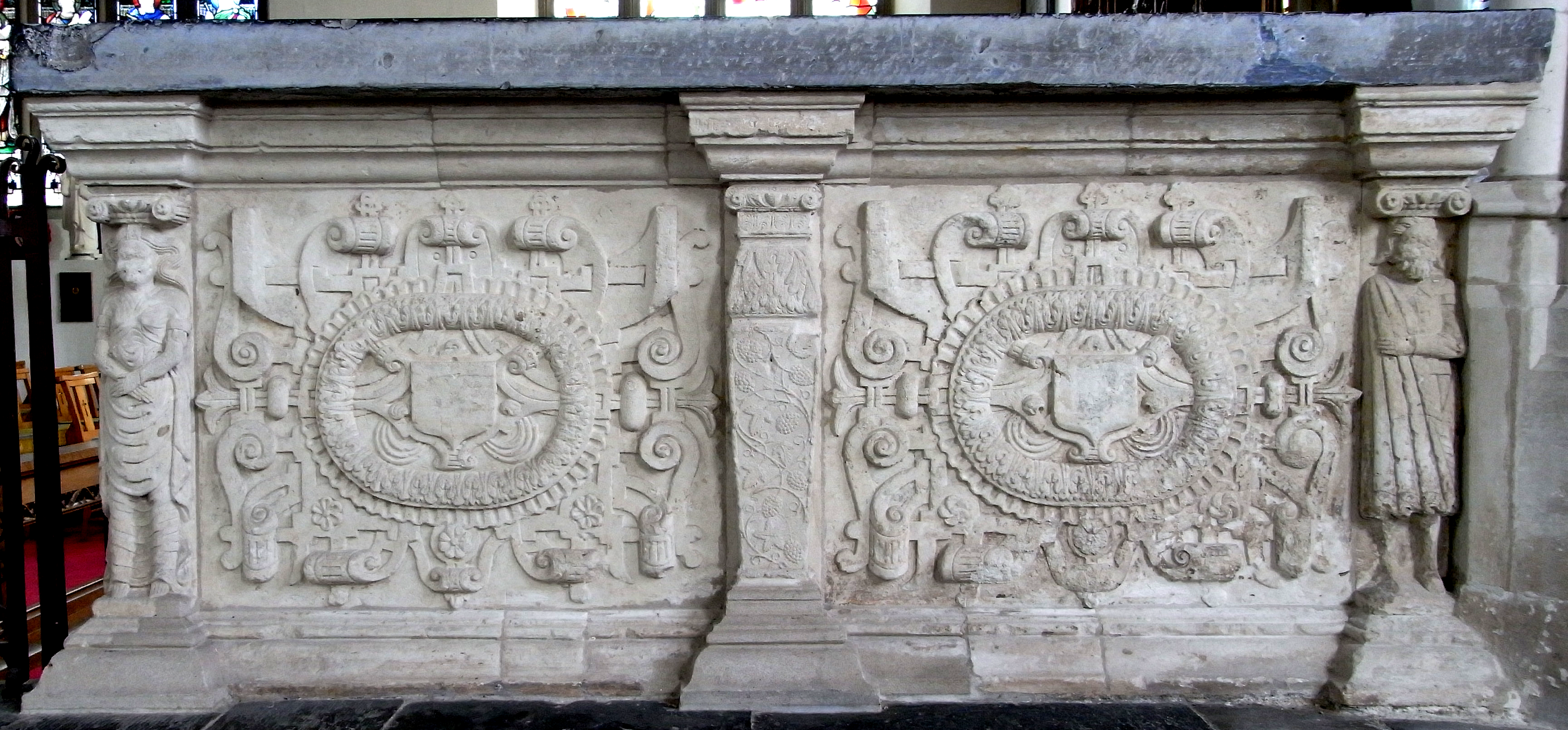
Chest tomb of George Slee, St Peter's Church, Tiverton, south side

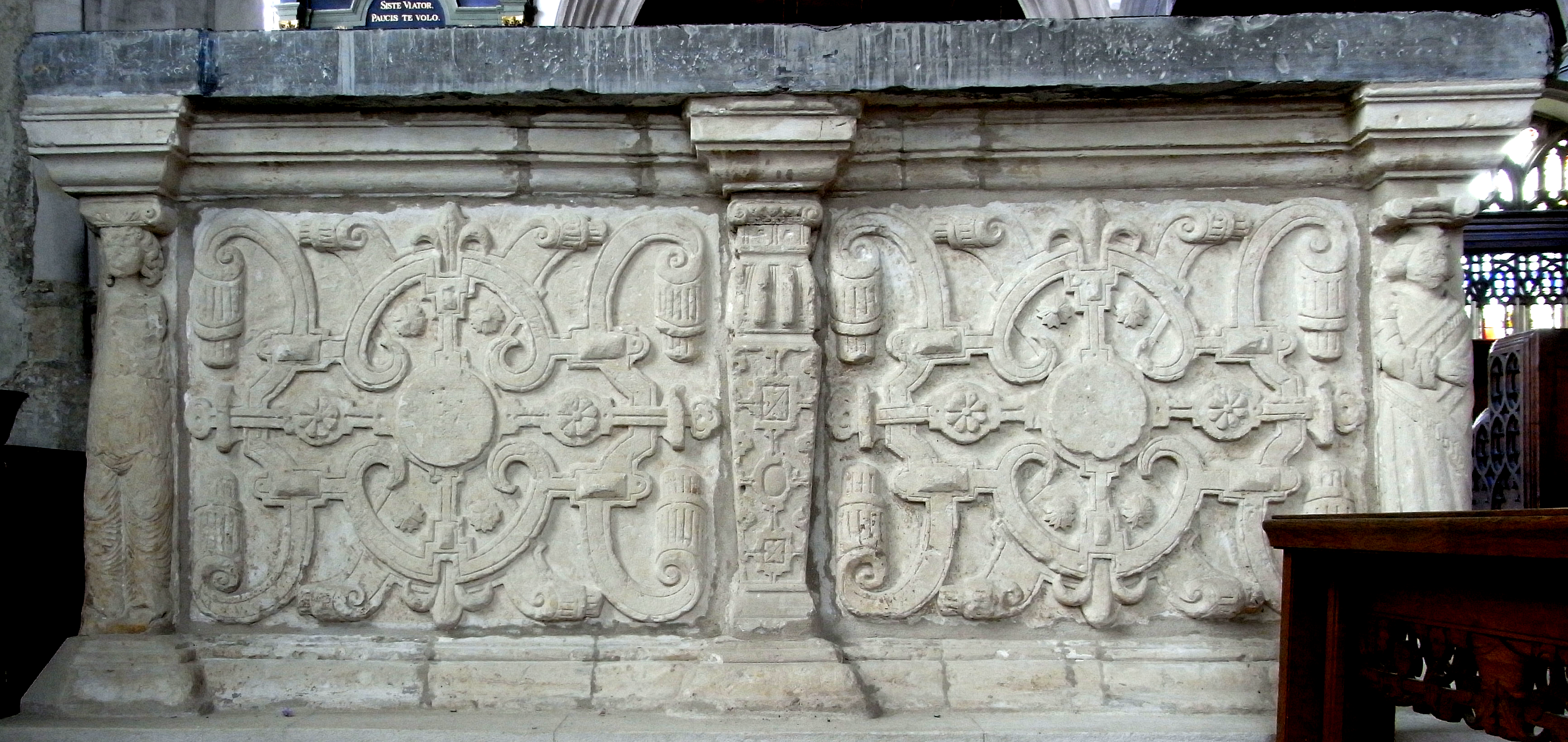
Chest tomb of George Slee, St Peter's Church, Tiverton, north side

George Slee (died 1 September 1613) of the Great House, Peter Street, Tiverton, Devon, was a wealthy wool merchant and clothier. He founded Slee's Almshouses in Tiverton, the building of which survives next to the Great House in Peter Street. His ornate chest tomb survives in St Peter's Church, Tiverton.

== Career ==
He manufactured and exported (via the port of Exeter, further downstream the River Exe from Tiverton) the famous Tiverton kerseys.

== Marriage and children ==
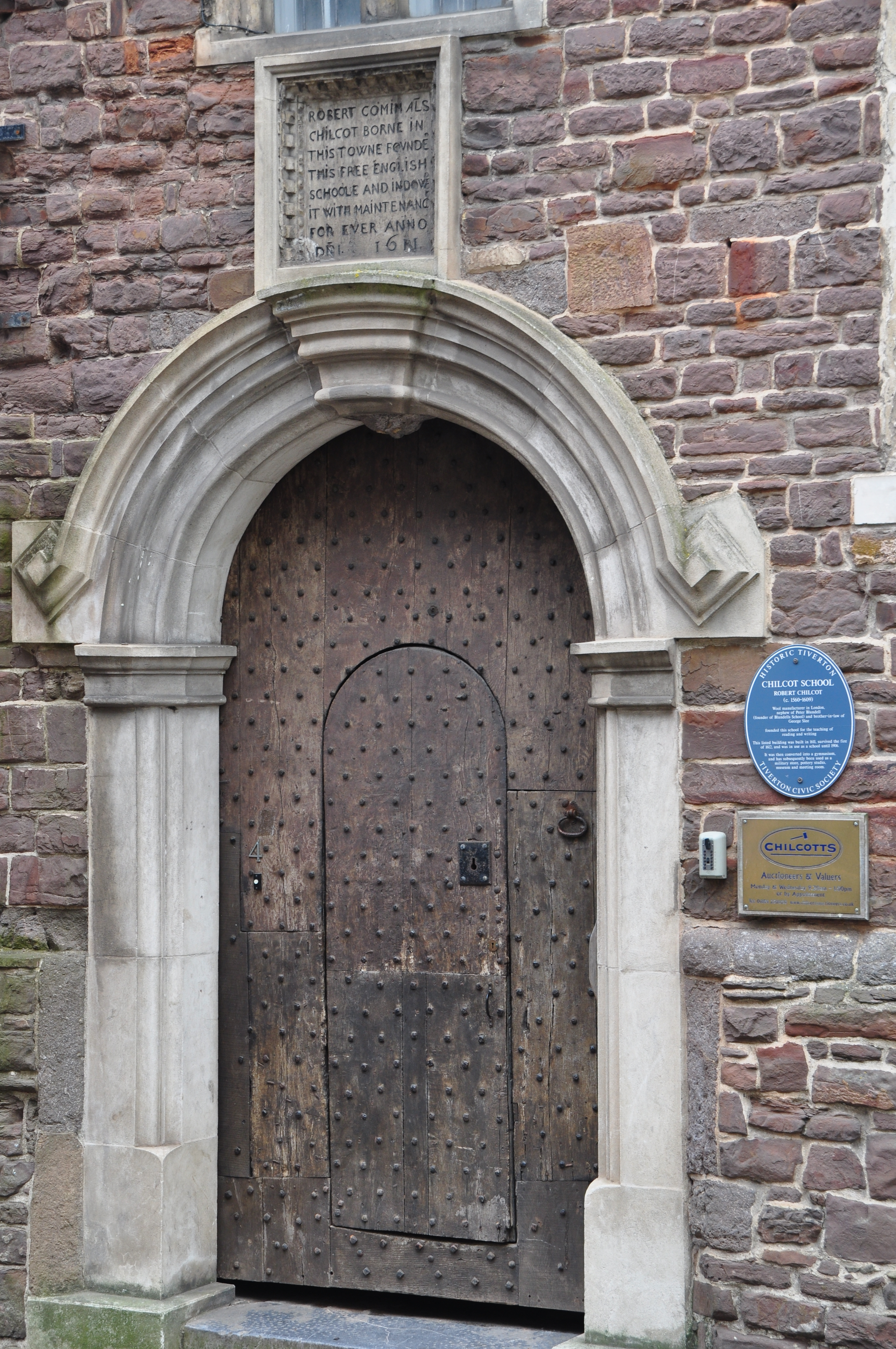
Chilcot's School, Tiverton, founded by Robert Chilcot (c.1560-1609), brother-in-law of George Slee

On 10 August 1581 he married Joan Chilcot (d. 13 June 1630), a sister of Robert Chilcot (c.1560-1609) (alias Comin/Comyns) of Tiverton, merchant, founder of Chilcot's School, in Peter Street, Tiverton. Joan Chilcot's mother was Eleanor Blundell, a sister of the eminent Tiverton merchant Peter Blundell (c. 1520-1601), founder of Blundell's School. Slee was one of the executors of Peter Blundell's will and was one of the founding feoffees of Blundell's School.

By his wife he had 7 children, including Roger Slee (Born 23 June 1582).

== Founds almshouses ==
Slee's Almshouses were founded by George Slee in 1610 and were built posthumously in 1613 in accordance with the instructions in his will. He bequeathed £500 for the purpose and directed that they should be "for six poore aged woemen to dwell in". The women were to be aged at least "three score years", and were to be nominated by his wife Joan, and following her death by Churchwardens of St Peter's Church in Tiverton. The six women were to be "of honest name and fame" and for their maintenance received 12 pence per week payable on Saturdays. The Almshouses are described by Martin Dunsford (1744–1807) in his 1790 work Historical Memoirs of the Town and Parish of Tiverton.

A tripartite indenture was made on 19 July 1625, summarised as follows:

"...between Roger Slee of Tiverton, Merchant, son and heir of the said George Slee of the first part; William Slee of Uplowman, William Hame (son-in-law of George Slee), William Coleman (son-in-law of George Slee), William Spurway (son-in-law of George Slee), John Berry (son-in-law of George Slee), Robert Dayman, Peter Blundell (nephew of George Slee), Peter West, Peter Spurway, Thomas Bury, and three others, all of Tiverton, being nominated as (Trustees in the indenture, of the second part, and Johane Slee, widdowe, executrix of the last will and testament of George Slee, of the third part; wherein it is recited that she, by the advise of her overseers, had purchased a plote of ground within the town of Tyverton neere adjoining to the dwelling house of the said George Slee, in Peter Street there, and hath erected and built uppon the same plote of ground six dwelling houses for six poore women to dwell in, etc."

== Death & will ==
George Slee made 44 cash bequests in his will, totalling £4,120, including many to the poor.. In his will he also dealt with his many landholdings in the parishes of Tiverton, Coldridge, Uplowman and Halberton.

== Monument ==
The chest tomb of George Slee survives in St Peter's Church, Tiverton. The sides of the chest tomb are decorated with strapwork panels, and Caryatids. The thick marble ledger stone on top is deeply inscribed in Gothic lettering as follows:

"Here under lieth buried the body of George Slee of Tiverton, marchant, who departed this life the first daie of September anno Domini 1613 ..... He gave by his will, to be distributed to the poorest people of Tiverton, £50; to the parish church and church-yard of Tiverton, £10; to and for the building of an alms-house, for six poor, aged, and honest women, and to purchase rents for their maintenance, at 12d. the week to each of them, £500; to fifty poor crafts-men, of good and honest fame, 100£; to the poorest, honest, and painfullest labourers in Tiverton, 10£; to the parish church of Coleridge, for the relief and keeping on work of the poorest people there, 10£; to the poor of the parish of Halberton, 40s; to the poor of the parish of Uplowman, 40s. He left behind him living, two sons and three daughters."
