= Perambulation of the Town Leat =

The Perambulation of the Town Leat is a traditional mediaeval custom, also known as water-bailing, that takes place in the town of Tiverton, Devon, England, once every seven years. The event commemorates and claims the gift of the town's water supply in around 1262 from Isabella, Countess of Devon.

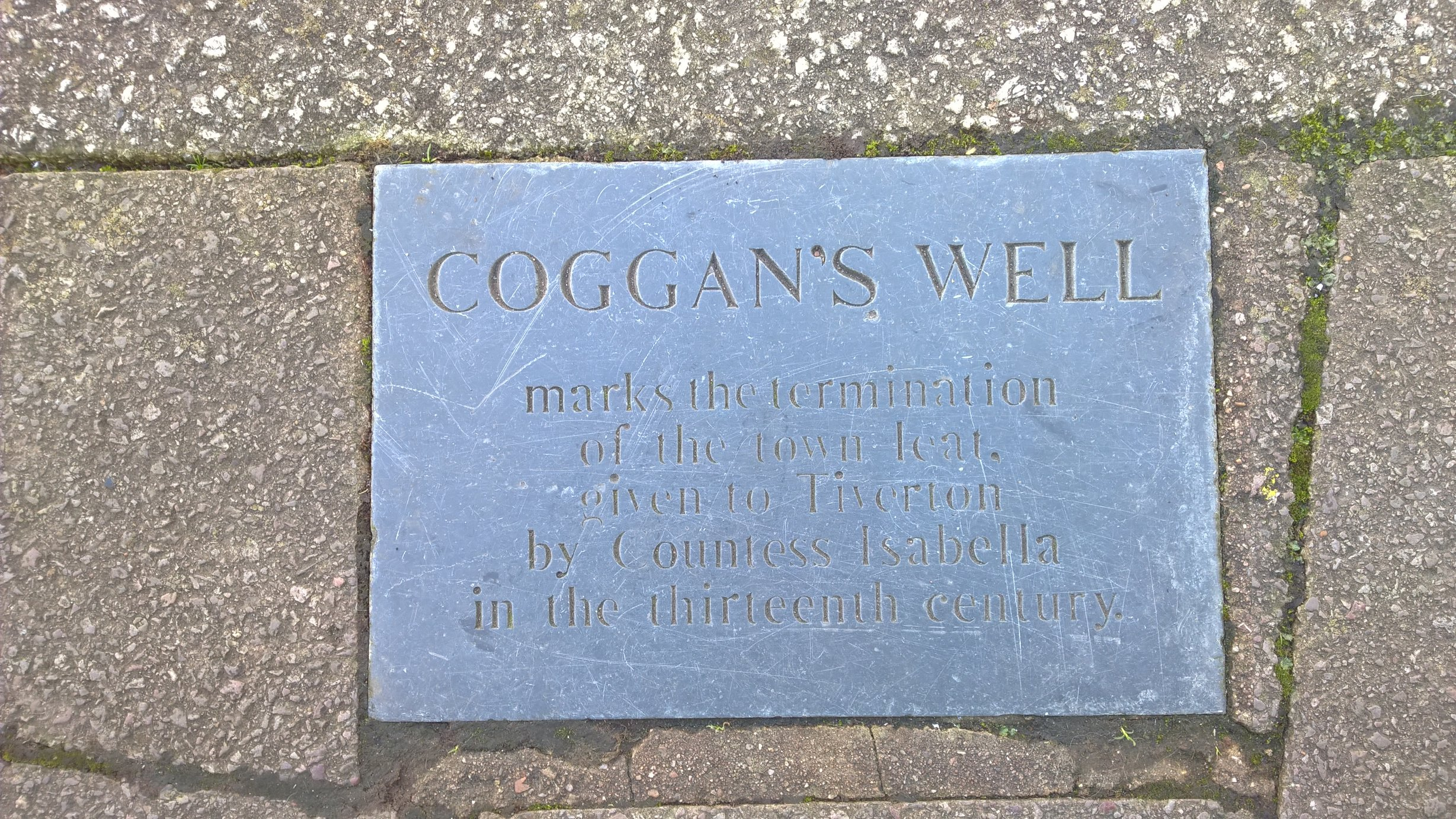
Plaque at Coggan's Well in Fore Street indicating the termination of the leat

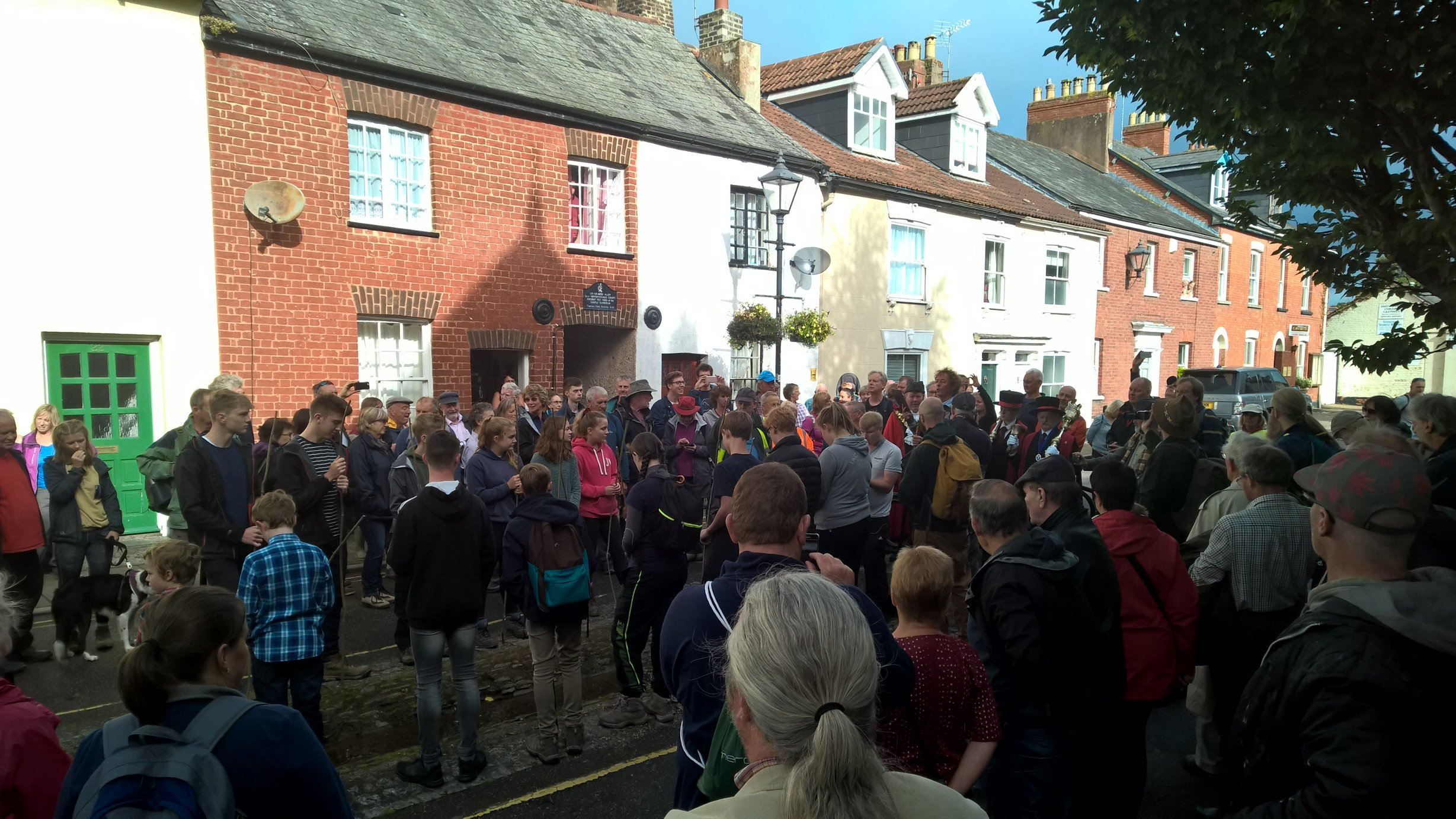
The proclamation in Castle Street during the 2017 perambulation

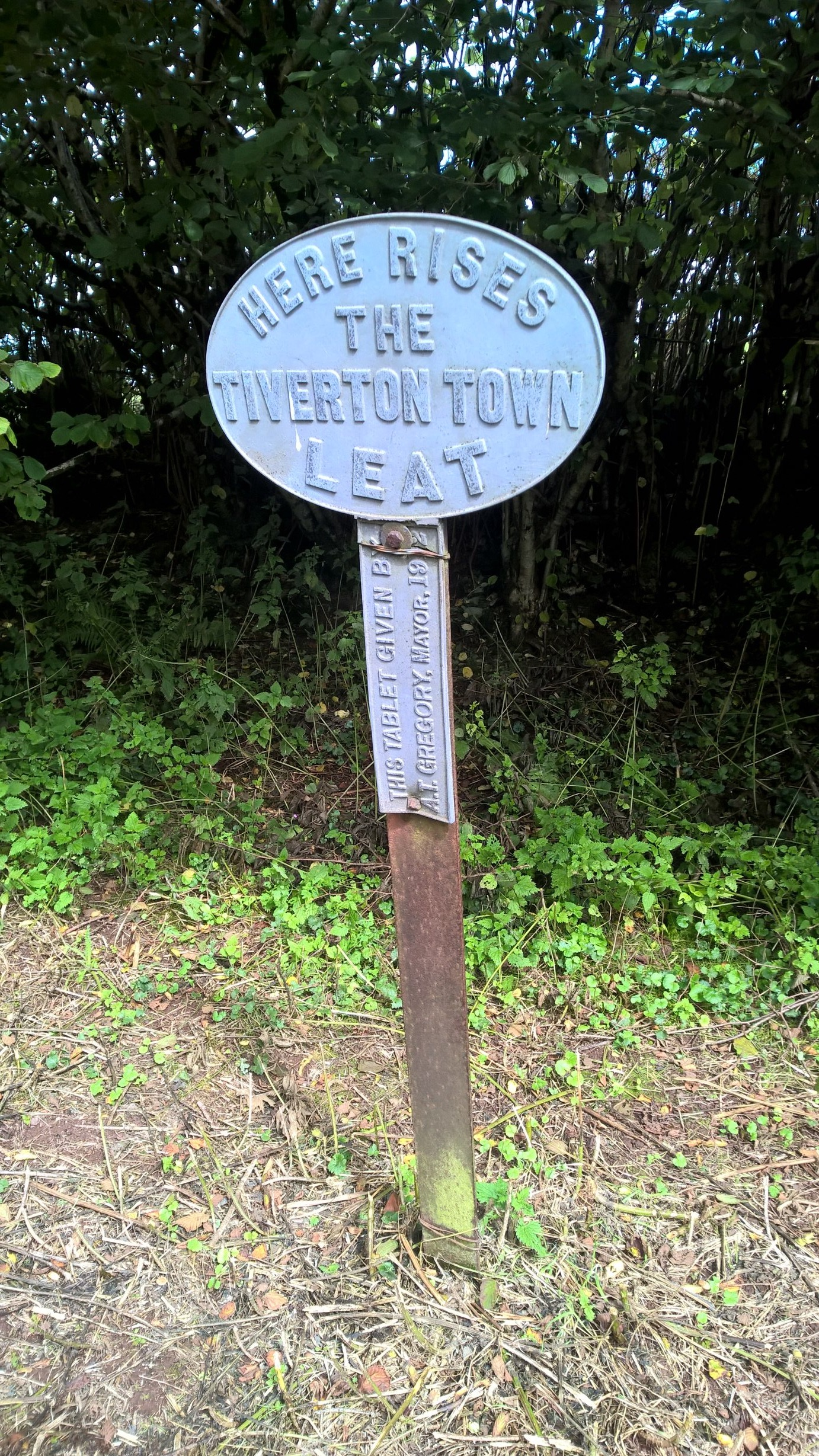
Sign showing the source of the leat at Norwood Common

The tradition involves walking the length of the watercourse (the leat) to its source six miles away at Norwood Common.

The procession starts at the Town Hall and is led by the four individuals known as "pioneers" armed with pickaxes and sledgehammers whose job it is to demolish any obstruction found in the stream. Behind the pioneers is the Bailiff of the Hundred, who carries an ancient staff of office, behind him are the "Withy-boys", drawn from Blundell's School and Tiverton High School, whose job it is to whip the stream with willow sticks – or withy-wands. Then come the police, the town beadle, the Mayor of Tiverton, his fellow councillors, and lastly, the general public.

The procession's first stop is Coggan's Well in Fore Street, the traditional centre of the town where the stream emerges from underneath the road. Placing his staff in the water, the Bailiff of the Hundred claims the stream "for ever, for the sole use and benefit and as the right of the inhabitants of the town of Tiverton". Further proclamations are made at Castle Street, Townsend, Brickhouse Hill, Chettiscombe, the waterworks at Allers and finally at Norwood Common, where a plaque marks the actual source. The ancient route now involves negotiating walls, private gardens and making use of many paths that are not public rights of way, some of which must be cleared on each perambulation.

When completed on 9 September 2017 some 450 people completed the trek. It was last undertaken on 14 September 2024.
