= 1738 in Great Britain =

Events from the year 1738 in Great Britain.

== Incumbents ==
- Monarch – George II
- Prime Minister – Robert Walpole (Whig)

== Events ==
- 28 March – mariner Robert Jenkins presents a pickled ear, which he claims was cut off by a Spanish captain in the Caribbean in 1731, to Parliament, which votes, 257 to 209, for war against Spain, leading to the War of Jenkins' Ear the following year.
- 15 April – première in London of Serse, an Italian opera by George Frideric Handel.
- May
  - Tiverton riot: wool trade workers riot over prices in Tiverton, Devon.
  - The Fetter Lane Society is founded by followers of the Moravian Church in London.
- 24 May – John Wesley, newly returned from America, experiences a spiritual rebirth at a Moravian Church meeting in Aldersgate in the City of London, essentially launching the Methodist movement; the day is celebrated annually by Methodists as Aldersgate Day. His younger brother Charles had a similar experience three days earlier.
- 24 June – Lewis Paul and John Wyatt obtain a patent for roller cotton-spinning machinery.
- 1 July – William Champion of Bristol patents a process to distill zinc from calamine using charcoal in a smelter.
- 10 July – Thomas Pellow of Cornwall finally escapes captivity, 23 years after having been captured by Barbary pirates and held as a slave in Morocco. He arrives in British territory when the ship he is on sails into Gibraltar Bay on 21 July, and later recounts his story in the book The Adventures of Thomas Pellow, of Penryn, Mariner: Three and Twenty Years in Captivity Among the Moors.
- 18 September – Samuel Johnson composes his first solemn prayer (published 1785).
- Late (dated 1739) – David Hume's A Treatise of Human Nature is published anonymously.
- Undated – William Kent is appointed to remodel Rousham House and gardens in Oxfordshire, "a landmark in the history of the Romantic movement."

== Births ==
- 9 February (bapt.) – Mary Whateley, poet and playwright (died 1825)
- 14 April – William Cavendish-Bentinck, 3rd Duke of Portland, Prime Minister of the United Kingdom (died 1809)
- 16 April – Henry Clinton, British army general and politician (died 1795)
- 9 May – John Wolcot, satirist and poet (died 1819)
- 4 June (New Style, 24 May Old Style)
  - King George III of the United Kingdom (died 1820)
  - James Martin, radical politician (died 1810)
- 11 October – Arthur Phillip, admiral and Governor of New South Wales (died 1814)
- 15 November – William Herschel, German-born British astronomer (died 1822)
- 31 December – Charles Cornwallis, 1st Marquess Cornwallis, general (died 1805)

== Deaths ==
- 1 May – Charles Howard, 3rd Earl of Carlisle, English statesman (born c. 1669)
- 21 June – Charles Townshend, 2nd Viscount Townshend, English politician (born 1674)
- 22 December – Constantia Jones, prostitute (executed) (born c. 1708)

== See also ==
- 1738 in Wales
