= Tiverton fire of 1731 =

Coordinates: 50.904°N 3.484°W

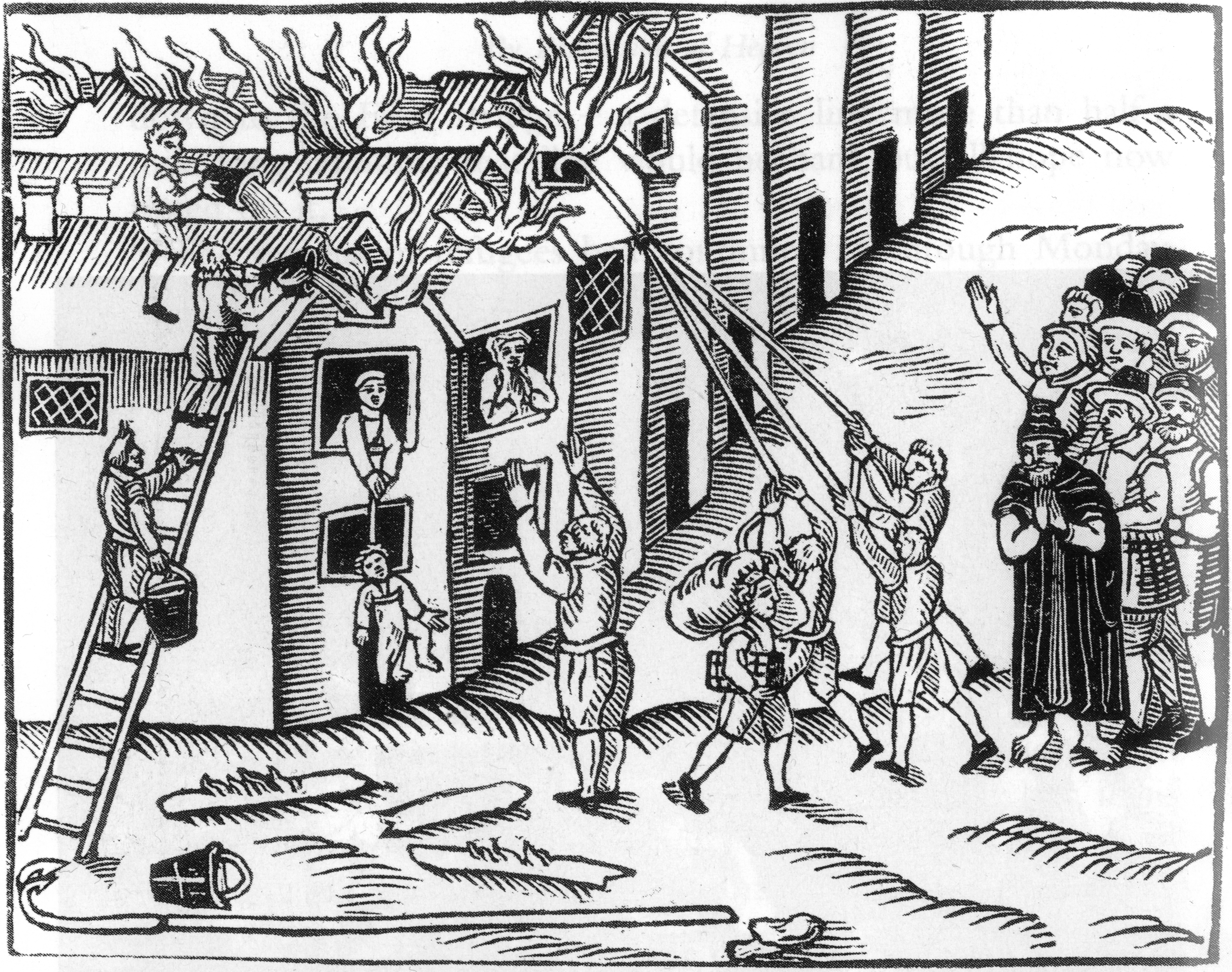
Firefighting in Tiverton. Pictured is an earlier fire of 1612.

The Tiverton fire of 1731, also known as the Great Fire, was a fire that affected part of Tiverton, Devon in England on 5 June 1731. It was one of a number of serious fires affecting the town in the 17th and 18th centuries. Breaking out in a baker's house in Gold Street, the fire spread rapidly due to the prevalence of straw-thatched roofs in the town. In total 298 houses were destroyed in the fire which caused damage to the value of an estimated £58,976 14s. 9d. In response to the fire, a number of benefactors came forward to assist Tiverton in rebuilding. The fire resulted in the introduction of legislation that attempted to prevent a similar incident happening in the future.

== Background and response ==
Tiverton had previously been affected by a number of severely damaging fires. The first recorded fire was in April 1598, which destroyed 400 houses and resulted in 33 deaths. A more serious fire occurred in August 1612, which destroyed 600 houses. Smaller fires subsequently broke out in 1676, 1726 and 1730. Later fires followed the one in 1731, and in total over 530 houses were destroyed by fire in the 18th century.

The fire in 1731 started on 5 June at approximately 6pm at a baker's house in Gold Street. The fire spread quickly due to the preponderance of straw thatched roofs in the area, further exaggerated by the presence of a strong northerly wind. The fire brigade was delayed from tackling the flames, as the fire engines were housed in a church some distance from the origin of the fire. As the flames spread rapidly into other streets, there was confusion among the general population as to how to attempt to put the fire out. Many people rescued items from burning buildings and deposited them in churches or threw them into fields.

One of the largest local fire engines, which was brought to the scene on Gold Street, was itself destroyed in the fire, as burning debris fell from the houses either side. Henry Murray, who lived in one of Greenway's Almshouses on the street, refused to leave the building on the basis that he had never heard of an almshouse being burned down. Although the Almshouses had survived earlier fires in 1598 and 1612, it was destroyed in this fire and Murray died as a result.

== Aftermath ==
Tiverton (Rebuilding After the Fire) Act 1731
- Act of Parliament
- Parliament of Great Britain
- Long title: An Act for the better and more easy re-building of the Town of Tiverton, in the County of Devon; and for determining Differences touching Houses and Buildings burnt down or demolished by reason of the late dreadful Fire there; and for the better preventing Dangers from Fire for the future.
- Citation: 5 Geo. 2. c. 14
- Territorial extent: Great Britain

Dates
- Royal assent: 1 June 1732
- Commencement: 13 January 1732 (Note: Start of session.)
Other legislation
Relates to	Blandford Forum (Rebuilding After the Fire) Act 1731

Status: Current legislation

Text of statute as originally enacted

In total, 298 houses were destroyed by the fire, and the total damage was estimated at £58,976 14s. 9d. The Rev Samuel Newte, in a letter to a London schoolmaster published in the Gentleman's Magazine, described the extent of the fire as follows: "All the houses from Loman Bridge to the end of High Street, (a few about the church excepted,) and all the dwellings backward, the greatest part of Barriton and Bampton Streets, also an Aims-House, Corn-Market House, Market Cross and Shambles, are entirely laid in ashes."

As news of the fire spread, donations to cover the damage costs were brought to Tiverton from various places. Within a few days of the event, £381 10s. 4d. had been raised, including a donation of twenty guineas from the Exeter Corporation. The mayor of Tiverton also encouraged a collection among the local population to assist those who had been worst affected by the blaze, and all those affected were instructed to calculate the total loss they had sustained. The total sum of this account was £56,055. 4s. 9d., although this does not include the £2200 cost of rebuilding Greenway's Almshouses, or the £721. 10s. of losses which was reported afterwards.

The Bishop of Exeter issued a circular letter in his diocese, appealing for contributions towards the fund for Tiverton; a significant amount was subsequently raised. The populations of other cities, including London and Bristol, gathered notable collections for Tiverton, and also for Blandford and Ramsey which had similarly been affected by fire. Other large benefactors included the king, queen and the Prince of Wales.

As well as the material damage, the fire had an adverse impact on the health of the Tiverton population. Smallpox, which had afflicted the town for a while, became more prevalent as people were forced to share the houses that had survived the flames, which in some instances meant eight or ten families living in one building. The destruction of property also meant a lack of space for smallpox sufferers to recover without afflicting others.

Legislation followed in an attempt to prevent further similar fires in the future. This included an Act to replace thatched roofs with roofs made with slate or lead and to widen the streets. This legislation also made provision for rebuilding in Tiverton. Merchants constructed several large properties in the town, including Gotham House, meaning that Tiverton became home to an unusual number of elaborate Georgian townhouses. The Chilcott School in St Peter's Street, dating back to 1611, managed to survive the fire.
