= Gotham House =

Georgian merchant's townhouse in Devon, England

Coordinates: 50.902°N 3.4872°W

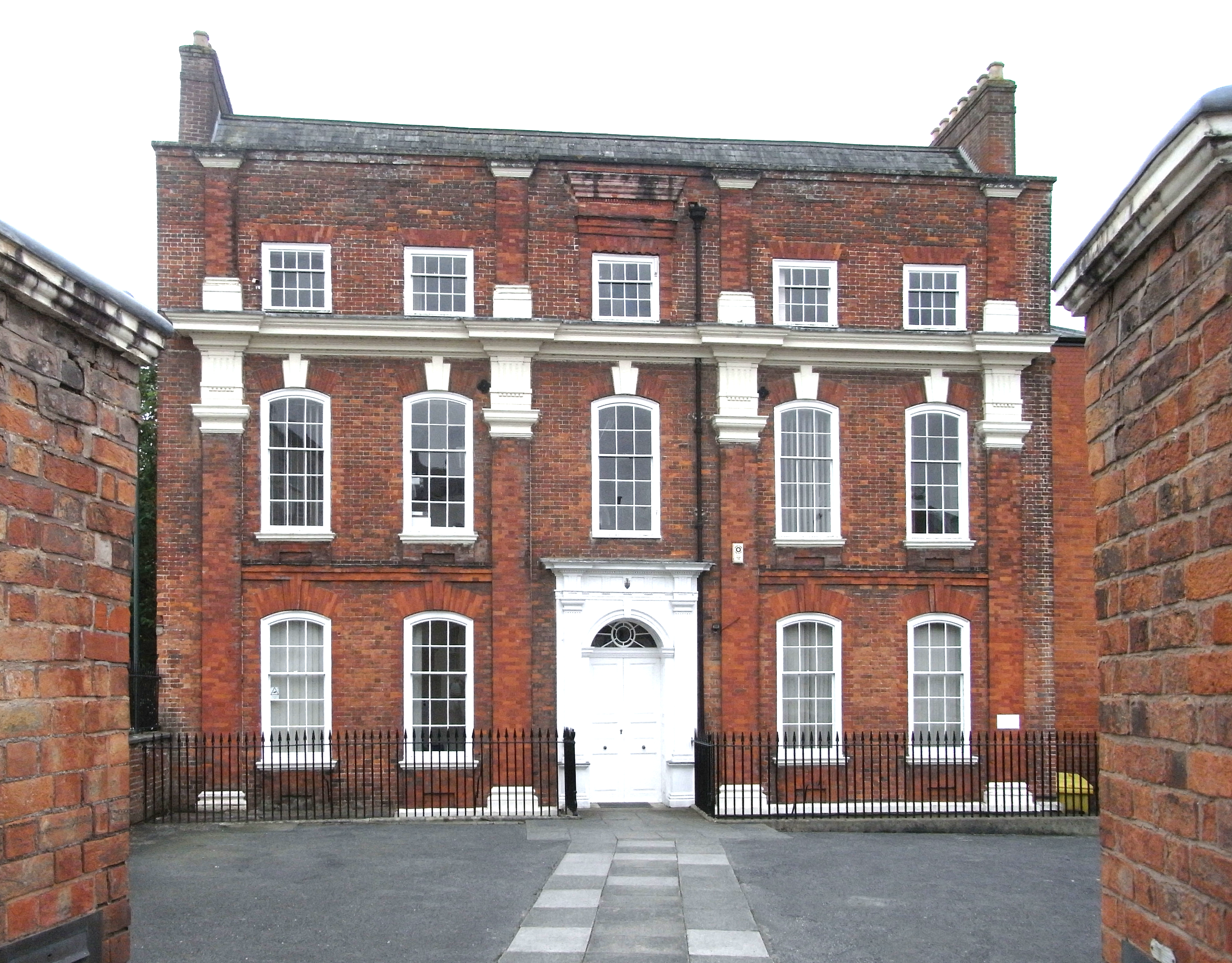
Gotham House, Tiverton

Gotham House is a Grade II* listed early 18th century Georgian merchant's townhouse on Phoenix Lane in the town of Tiverton in Devon, England. An ancient estate named "Gotham" also exists in the parish of Cadeleigh, near Tiverton, now represented by Gotham Farm. It was one of a number of buildings constructed in Tiverton following the disastrous Tiverton fire of 1731. The building was restored in 1966 and most recently served as the headquarters for independent housebuilder, Devonshire Homes. The house, its forecourt walls and entrance gates became listed on 12 February 1952.

== History ==
Gotham House was built in the early 18th century by clothing merchant and Mayor of Tiverton George Davey (1690–1746).

It was one of a number of buildings rebuilt in Tiverton following a fire of 1731, making it a rare example of an elaborate Georgian townhouse. The house remained in the Davey family for a few generations, passing to George Davey's son Roger after his death, and then to his brother George. It then became the property of George's daughter and son-in-law, Captain John and Bridget Hamilton. In the 1880s, Major Poyntz, Chief Constable of Essex, resided at Gotham House. The building became the Tiverton office of Ashfords Solicitors in 1960 and was subsequently restored in 1966 by architects Clement Toy and Raymond Erith. It has occasionally been open to the public since then but closed as Ashfords' office in 2021. In 2023, Gotham House was purchased by Devonshire Homes. It was their head office until they went into administration in June 2026.

== Architecture ==
=== Exterior ===
Gotham House is a 3-storey Flemish bond red brick building, with a basement. It has a symmetrical 5-bay front with four brick columns reaching to the top of the first floor, two surrounding the entranceway and one at each end. These are topped with moulded caps and a projecting white cornice. Four columns extend from this cornice to the roof. The windows have slate stonework below and are topped with arches of rubbed brick in a lighter colour; there are fourteen windows at the front and fifteen at the back. The house has pilastered doorcases at both the front and rear. At the front, there is also a round-headed outer doorway. The house has a slate roof with an 'M' profile, with chimney stacks at either end constructed of brick with yellow chimney pots. There is cast-iron guttering.

=== Interior ===
The house has a double depth plan, being two rooms wide. The interior retains many 18th-century features, including a library containing books and manuscripts from the period and a mahogany staircase dating back to its original constructions. There is a marble mantelpiece, with Corinthian columns and a frieze with depictions of sphinxes and cherubs. Surviving additions from the 19th century include a pantry and a dumb waiter. Several historical items have been found in the basement, including documents signed by Oliver Cromwell.
