= Simon Hall (chemist) =

English professor of chemistry

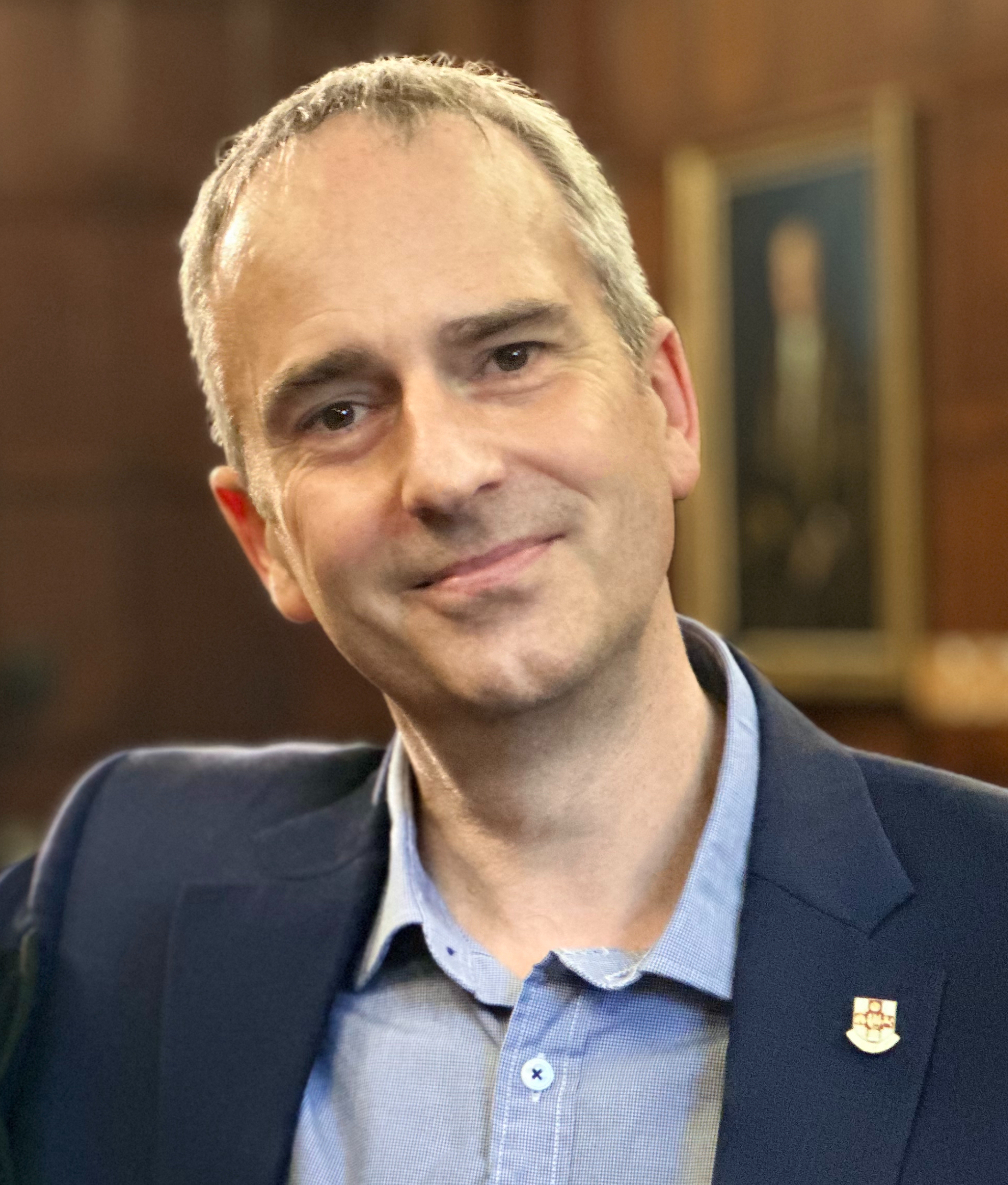
- Born: 3 November 1969 (age 56); Stratford-Upon-Avon
- Education: The Open University, University of Bristol
- Awards: 2018 - Fellow of the Royal Society of Chemistry, 2015 - Matsumae International Fellowship, 2015 - Nanotechnology Platform Japan Prize - Ministry of Education, Culture, Sports, Science and Technology, 2013 - Fellow of the Higher Education Academy, 2004 - Royal Society University Research Fellowship
- Scientific career
- Fields: Chemistry; Biomineralization; Biomimetics; Nanoscience; Superconductivity
- Thesis: Template Control of the Structure of Minerals (2000)
- Doctoral advisor: Stephen Mann
- Website: https://www.bristol.ac.uk/people/person/Simon-Hall-92acafd8-81e2-4e92-9eab-3ea597cc049a/

Simon Robert Hall is an English chemist who is Professor of Chemistry at the University of Bristol. He has been the Head of Inorganic and Materials Chemistry at Bristol since 2023.

== Education ==
Born in Stratford-Upon-Avon, Hall grew up in Tiverton, Devon. He attended Tiverton Comprehensive School (now Tiverton High School), where he played rhythm guitar in the band of future 3 Colours Red frontman Pete Vuckovic. On leaving school, he worked for Reuters Ltd. as a stocks and bonds pricing analyst, simultaneously studying for a BSc degree with the Open University. On graduating with a 2:1 degree in Chemistry with Geology in 1997, he joined the laboratories of Professor Stephen Mann at the University of Bristol to read for a PhD in Materials Chemistry. His doctoral research degree involved the creation of novel nanomaterials using a biomimetic approach and also the first ever electron diffraction study on the phylum Bryozoa.

== Research ==
Hall's research is concerned with the control of crystal growth, both organic and inorganic. His research activities include biomimetic materials chemistry, synthesis of nanoscale functional materials and control of organic crystal growth. In 2006, he published the first synthesis of single-crystal, high-temperature superconductor nanowires. Subsequent work on these systems led to his demonstration of the microcrucible growth mechanism; a nanowire growth mechanism that had been predicted, but never observed up until that point. His current work is focused on the creation of novel organic crystals for pharmaceutical and optoelectronic research and in the creation of novel forms of high temperature superconductors. Hall has published over 130 scientific papers with a current h-index of 36 and over 6,000 citations.

Professor Hall delivered his Inaugural Lecture in the Wills Memorial building on 24 October 2023, titled "Unexpected Crystals in the Bragging Area". The lecture can be viewed on YouTube by clicking on the lecture title above.

== Awards and memberships ==
Hall was admitted as a Fellow of the Royal Society of Chemistry (FRSC) in 2018. In the same year, he was made a Visiting Professor of Chemistry, Keio University, Tokyo, Japan. In 2016, he was made a Visiting Professor of Materials Science at Nagaoka University of Technology, Japan. In 2015, Hall was awarded the Matsumae Foundation International Fellowship. In the same year he won the Nanotechnology Platform Japan Prize from the Ministry of Education, Culture, Sports, Science and Technology, (Japanese Government), for his discovery of the microcrucible growth mechanism in nanowires. In 2013 he was made a Fellow of the Higher Education Academy. In 2004, Hall was awarded a Royal Society University Research Fellowship for his proposal on 'Biotemplated Routes to Advanced Superconductors'.

In 2026, Hall was made a Doctor of Science (DSc) of the Open University on the basis of a selection of published papers.
