= John Waldron =

John Waldron may refer to:

- John Waldron (police officer) (1910–1975), commissioner of the London Metropolitan Police from 1968 to 1972
- John C. Waldron (1900–1942), American torpedo squadron commander killed at the Battle of Midway
- Jack Waldron (basketball) (John J. Waldron, died 1971), American brewery executive and president of the Boston Celtics from 1965 to 1967 and 1968 to 1970
- John Waldron (died 1579), merchant from Tiverton, Devon, England
- John Waldron (lawyer), lawyer based in Allentown, Pennsylvania
- John Waldron (politician), member of the Oklahoma House of Representatives
- John E. Waldron, President and COO of Goldman Sachs
