= Tiverton Corporation =

Historic local governing body of Tiverton, Devon, England

Tiverton Corporation, also known as the Corporation of Tiverton, was the historic governing body of the town of Tiverton in Devon, England. It operated under a series of royal charters and was responsible for local government, justice, and administration until its reformation under the Municipal Corporations Act 1835.

== History ==
Tiverton’s borough status dates back to medieval times, but it was formally incorporated by a charter from King James I in 1615. This charter established a civic structure including a mayor, twelve aldermen, and a group of common councillors.

Over time, the Corporation assumed many responsibilities, such as regulating the wool trade, maintaining law and order, administering poor relief, and managing markets, fairs, and public infrastructure.

== Governance ==
The Corporation was often operated by dominant powerful families. The mayor, elected annually by the aldermen, presided over borough courts and served as returning officer for parliamentary elections.

The Tiverton Corporation maintained close ties with national political figures, most notably the Ryder family, later ennobled as the Earls of Harrowby. Sir Dudley Ryder secured a seat in Tiverton in 1734, and his family maintained a political interest in the borough until the Reform Act of 1832.

Nathaniel Ryder represented Tiverton until 1776 before being raised to the peerage. His son, Dudley Ryder (later 1st Earl of Harrowby), was MP for Tiverton from 1784.

By 1795, the Ryder family controlled both of Tiverton’s parliamentary seats. Dudley and his brother Richard Ryder (a future Home Secretary) were elected. The family's influence extended to local governance: Dudley Ryder served as Tiverton's Recorder, and correspondence with town clerk Beavis Wood reveals close coordination on civic and political matters.

== Economic and Social Role ==
During the 17th and 18th centuries, Tiverton flourished as a centre for the woollen cloth industry. The Corporation regulated trade, apprenticeships, and civic infrastructure such as roads, markets, and schools.

It also managed charitable institutions, including Blundell's School.

== Reform and Dissolution ==
By the early 19th century, the Corporation was criticised as unrepresentative and self-selecting. Parliamentary debate in 1835 alleged patronage and corruption. The Municipal Corporations Act 1835 abolished the Corporation and replaced it with an elected borough council.

== Mayors of Tiverton (1767–1800) ==
Note: The mayoral term began and ended in late August.

Notable figures include:

- Benjamin Dickinson – Suppressed 1770 weaving unrest
- Rev. John Pitman – Led famine relief in 1800

Mayors of Tiverton, 1767–1800
Year	Name
1767	William Gorton
1768	John Tucker
1769	Benjamin Dickinson
1770	John Besly
1771	John Davey
1772	William Martin
1773	Thomas Hodge
1774	William Lewis
1775	William Martin
1776	John Owens
1777	Henry Osmond
1778	John Tucker
1779	William Tucker
1780	John Govett
1781	John Davey
1782	Benjamin Dickinson
1783	John Besly
1784	John Webber
1785	Thomas Enchmarch
1786	Henry Dunsford
1787	Beavis Wood
1788	Henry Osmond
1789	John Davey
1790	Henry Peard Osmond
1791	John Besly
1792	William Tucker
1793	Richard Enchmarch
1794	William Walker
1795	William Lewis
1796	William Jenkins
1797	George Cruwys
1798	William Besly
1799	John Burridge Cholwich
1800	John Pitman

== Legacy ==
Although abolished in 1835, the Corporation left a legacy in local governance traditions, educational institutions, and surviving historical records.
