= List of mayors of Tiverton =

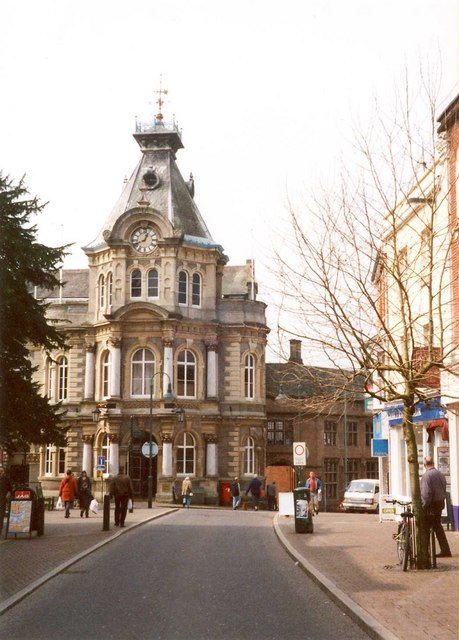
Tiverton Town Hall

The ancient borough of Tiverton in Devon, England, is governed by a mayor and Councillors.

The historic seat of government was Tiverton Guildhall, which was demolished to make way for the surviving Tiverton Town Hall, built in 1864 by Samuel Garth, Mayor of Tiverton 1861–2, to the design of Henry Lloyd, the architect of Exeter St Davids railway station. In the Mayoralty Room is a portrait of Sir John Heathcoat, MP for Tiverton (1832–1859).

== List of Mayors of Tiverton ==
- 1620: John Diamond (born 1541) of Tiverton
- 1625 James Cornish
- 1655: Thomas Fowler
- post 1655: Henry Newte (1609 - 1670), twice Mayor, post 1655 when he last acted as Town Clerk.
- 1683: Henry Blagdon
- 1686-1687: Sir Hugh Acland, 5th Baronet, also MP for Tiverton
- 1693: John How
- 1703: George Davey (1690–1746), of Gotham House, Tiverton.
- before 1766: John Webber, whose residence was "during the summer of 1766 [...] burnt to the ground; but whether by accident or intention is not stated"
- 1714: George Thorne
- 1724: Nathaniel Thorne
- 1749: Clement Govett
- 1754: Oliver Peard
- 1767/1770: B. Dickinson
- 1770: Henry Osmond
- 1776: John Owens
- 1799: J. B. Cholwich
- 1800: Rev. John Pitman
- 1801: Mr. Govett
- 1806: G. Cruwys
- 1810: John Govett
- 1814: Henry Dunsford
- 1832: Thomas Cosway
- 1832: William Dickinson
- 1861-62: Samuel Garth
- 1863-64: William North Row
- 1902-03: Tom Lake (Liberal)
- 1952-53 & 1971 Harold Shapland

1972-73 Vivian Leonard Scott 1973: Eric Shapland

- 2004: Janet Evans
- 2005: Paul Francis Williams
- 2016-2018 Stephen Flaws
- 2019-2020 Colin Slade
- 2023-2024 : Wallace Burke
- 2024-2025 Neal Davey
