= Tiverton Town Hall =

Municipal building in Tiverton, Devon, England

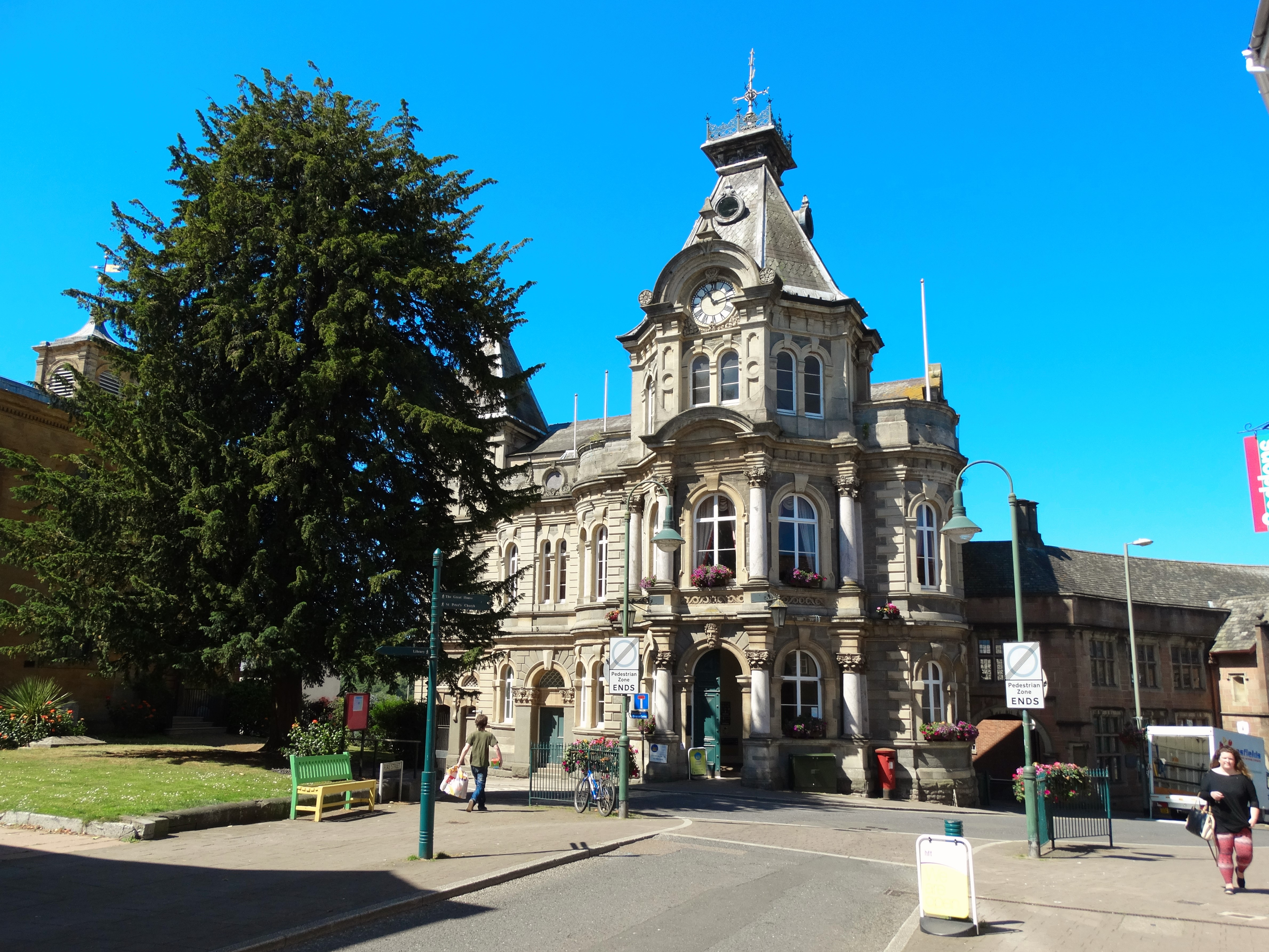
- Tiverton Town Hall

- Shown in Devon
- 50.9024°N 3.4888°W
- Location: St Andrew Street, Tiverton

History
- Built: 1864

Site notes
- Architect: Henry Lloyd
- Architectural style: Renaissance style

Listed Building – Grade II
- Official name: The Town Hall
- Designated: 5 December 1985
- Reference no.: 1384734

Tiverton Town Hall is a municipal building in St Andrew Street in Tiverton, Devon, England. The structure, which was the meeting place of Tiverton Borough Council, is a Grade II listed building.

== History ==
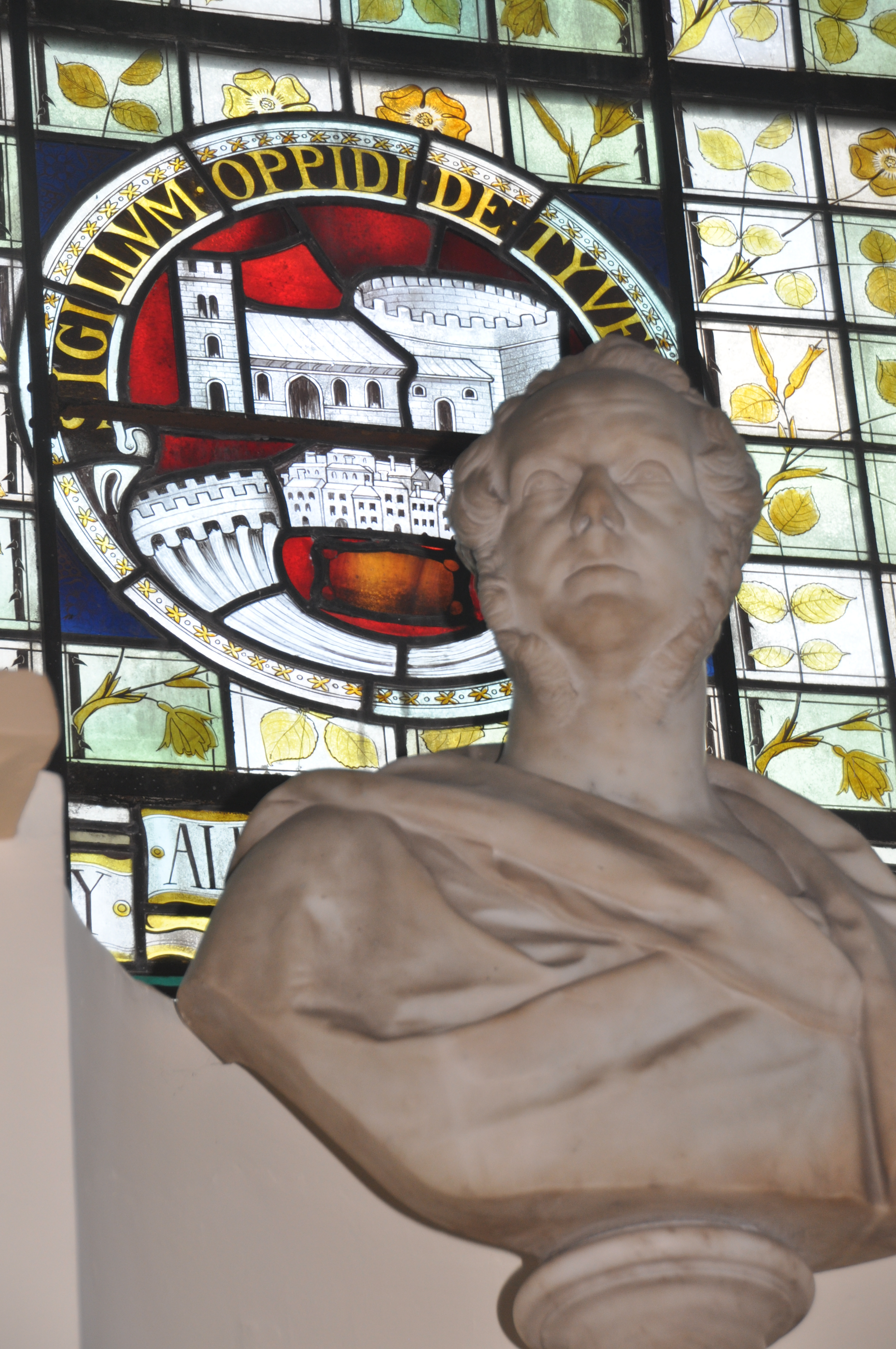
Bust of Viscount Palmerston in the council chamber

The first municipal building in Tiverton was a medieval guildhall built on the site of the old St Thomas's Chapel in around 1615. The guildhall incorporated magistrates' court facilities as well as the local gaol. Following significant population growth, in part associated with the local lacemaking industry established by John Heathcoat in the early 19th century, Tiverton became a municipal borough in 1835. In the 1860s, after finding the guildhall too small, civic leaders decided to demolish the old building and to erect a new town hall on the site.

The new building was designed by Henry Lloyd in the Renaissance style, built by a former mayor of the town, Samuel Garth, in ashlar stone at a cost of £12,000 and was officially opened in May 1864. The design involved an asymmetrical main frontage on the corner of Angel Hill and St Andrew Street; the central section of five bays featured, in the middle bay, an arched doorway flanked by Corinthian order columns supporting an entablature. On the first floor, there was a round headed window flanked by Corinthian order columns supporting an entablature and a segmental pediment and, on the second floor, there was a mullioned window flanked by Doric order pilasters supporting a segmental pediment containing a clock in the tympanum, above which there was a central turret with a steep slate roof; the clock (given by the Mayor, John Lane, in 1869) was by J. B. Joyce & Co of Whitchurch. The bays on either side of the middle bay were canted and the outer bays in the central section were curved. There was also a left hand section of two bays which contained, in the extreme left hand bay, a square tower with blind arches on the first and second floors and a turret above. Internally, the principal rooms were the council chamber and the mayoralty room.

The town hall continued to serve as the headquarters of the borough council for much of the 20th century but ceased to be the local seat of government when the enlarged Tiverton District Council was formed at The Great House in St Peter Street in 1974. The building subsequently became the local Citizens Advice office as well as the meeting place of Tiverton Town Council. An extensive programme of refurbishment works, to a design by Jonathan Rhind Architects was completed in December 2006.

Works of art in the building include a portrait by Godfrey Kneller of King George I, a portrait by an unknown artist of King George II and a portrait by Joshua Reynolds of King George III. Other items include a portrait by William Thomas Roden of the former local member of parliament and Prime Minister, Viscount Palmerston, a portrait by an unknown artist of the industrialist, John Heathcoat, and a bust of Viscount Palmerston which was presented to the town by a former mayor, William North Row.
