= Martin Dunsford =

English merchant & Dissenter (1744–1807)

Martin Dunsford (1744–1807) of Tiverton in Devon, was an English merchant and Dissenter, known as an antiquarian and radical politician. His work Memoirs of the Town and Parish of Tiverton is noted as an attempt to write of the town as a whole community.

== Life ==
He was the son of Martin Dunsford (1711–1763) who manufactured serge in Tiverton, Devon, having a large workshop created from a row of houses, and a workforce of over 50. His mother was Anne Stone. Educated at Blundell's School in Tiverton, he went into his father's business at age 13. He lived at Villa Franca, Park Road, now a listed building.

Dunsford is described in Lewis Namier's The Structure of Politics at the Accession of George III as the leader of a movement in Tiverton for extending the local franchise, at the end of the 18th century. Holding local political office as a Churchwarden, he opposed the Ryder family who controlled the parliamentary elections in the town. In 1781 he set up a petition to Parliament, presented through James Townsend, for greater electoral rights. The political interests of Nathaniel Ryder, 1st Baron Harrowby, and his ally Sir John Duntze, 1st Baronet, were not in fact threatened in any practical sense by the Dissenter faction led by Dunsford. The Town Clerk Beavis Wood monitored those activities and Dunsford and his supporters were branded by Wood as Jacobins and 'Crabs' in the 1790s.

== Memoirs of the Town and Parish of Tiverton ==
Dunsford wrote his major work, published 1790 by subscription, during the 1780s, a period when he acted as a churchwarden in Tiverton. His motivations were described in an unpublished autobiography, where he revealed his intention to promote civil liberties and religious freedom. It contains also information about early combinations in Devon.

The sources Dunsford used, besides his own research, included earlier work and collation by the antiquarians John Blundell, William Hewett and Thomas Westcott. A further edition appeared in 1836, edited by George Boyce.

=== Published editions ===
- Dunsford, Martin, Merchant, Historical Memoirs of the Town and Parish of Tiverton in the County of Devon, first published 1790; 1836 Edition, Boyce, George (Ed.)
