= Tiverton riots =

18th Century instances of unrest

The Tiverton riots refers to riots which broke out in Tiverton, Devon in May 1738 and again in 1749.

== 1738 riot ==
Labourers employed in woollen manufacture rioted in May 1738, in protest at a publican's undercutting of prices for serge. The publican, Grimes, bought serges which had been returned from the merchants to the serge makers, and resold them to the same merchants at a lower price. This practice, which the merchants encouraged in order to increase their profit, was thought to be very unfair towards the manufacturers.

The labourers assembled in Tiverton, and were joined by those of Uffculme, Bampton, Silverton, Collumpton, Bradninch and Culmstock. They attacked Grimes' house, the Red Lion Inn in Gold Street and broke into it. Having found a great number of serges, they threw them out and dragged them through the streets, hanged some upon his sign post and tore others in pieces. Grimes was found in the oven of a bake house, at the bottom of Poundhill, a few doors below his house. The rioters sat him astride a staff borne on their shoulders. They carried him through the streets and at last set him down before the house of the Mayor, Robert Dunsford, in St. Peter's Street. The mayor had him taken away. A great number of constables were sworn in to resist the rioters, many of whom were taken and put into prison for a few hours only. This much enraged the rest and occasioned a great battle between them and the constables, before whom the rioters retreated to the top of Exeter Hill, a short distance from the town. Another skirmish took place there, when one man was killed and many were wounded, which put an end to the riot.

== 1749 riot ==
In the 1740s, difficulties with the wool trade led to another outbreak of rioting in 1749. Workmen assembled to attack the house of Thomas Beedle, who was accused of acting as Grimes had done. They met in the Castle yard, drank a hogshead of cider and proceeded to Beedle's house, at the end of Waterlane. The rioters remained in and about the house for five hours, smashing his goods, dragging his chains of wool and worsted about the streets, and letting his beer run about the house more than ankle deep. They emptied his house entirely, and would have burnt it, but for the presence of his child lying in a cradle. Failing to find Beedle (who lay concealed at the Crown and Comb Inn, on the opposite side of the street) the rioters seized Moses Quick, one of his woolcombers. Quick was set astride a staff and carried around the town. He was dragged through several pools and the mill leat. The rioters endeavoured to break his thumbs to disable him from combing, and at length conveyed him to their club house; having there revived him with liquor, they sent him home nearly dead, and then retired to their respective habitations.
