= John Waldron (died 1579) =

Merchant from Tiverton, Devon, England

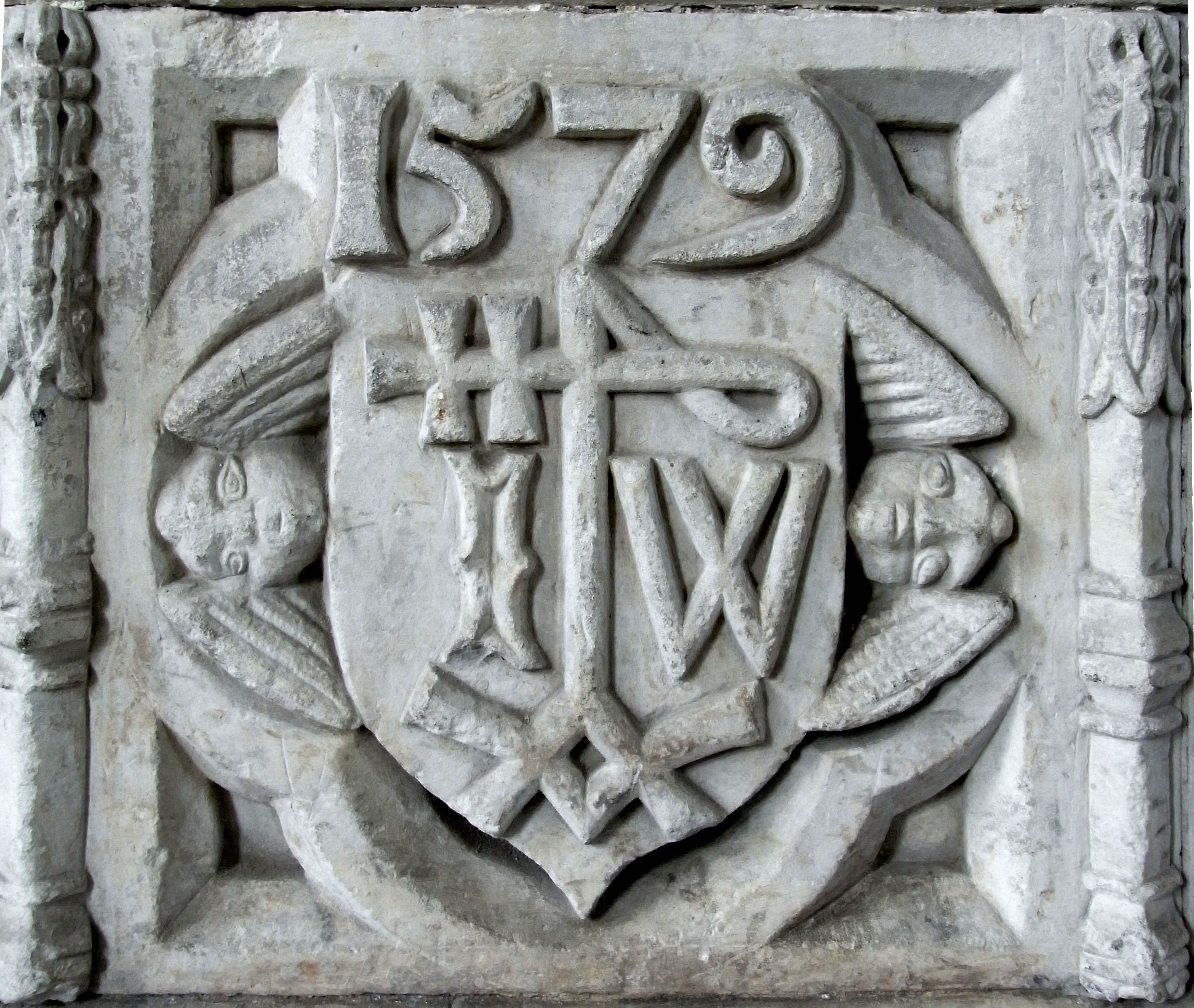
Merchant's mark of John Waldron, between the initials "JW", shown on an heraldic escutcheon beneath the date "1579", within a quatrefoil between Gothic pinnacles, detail from his chest tomb in St Peter's Church, Tiverton

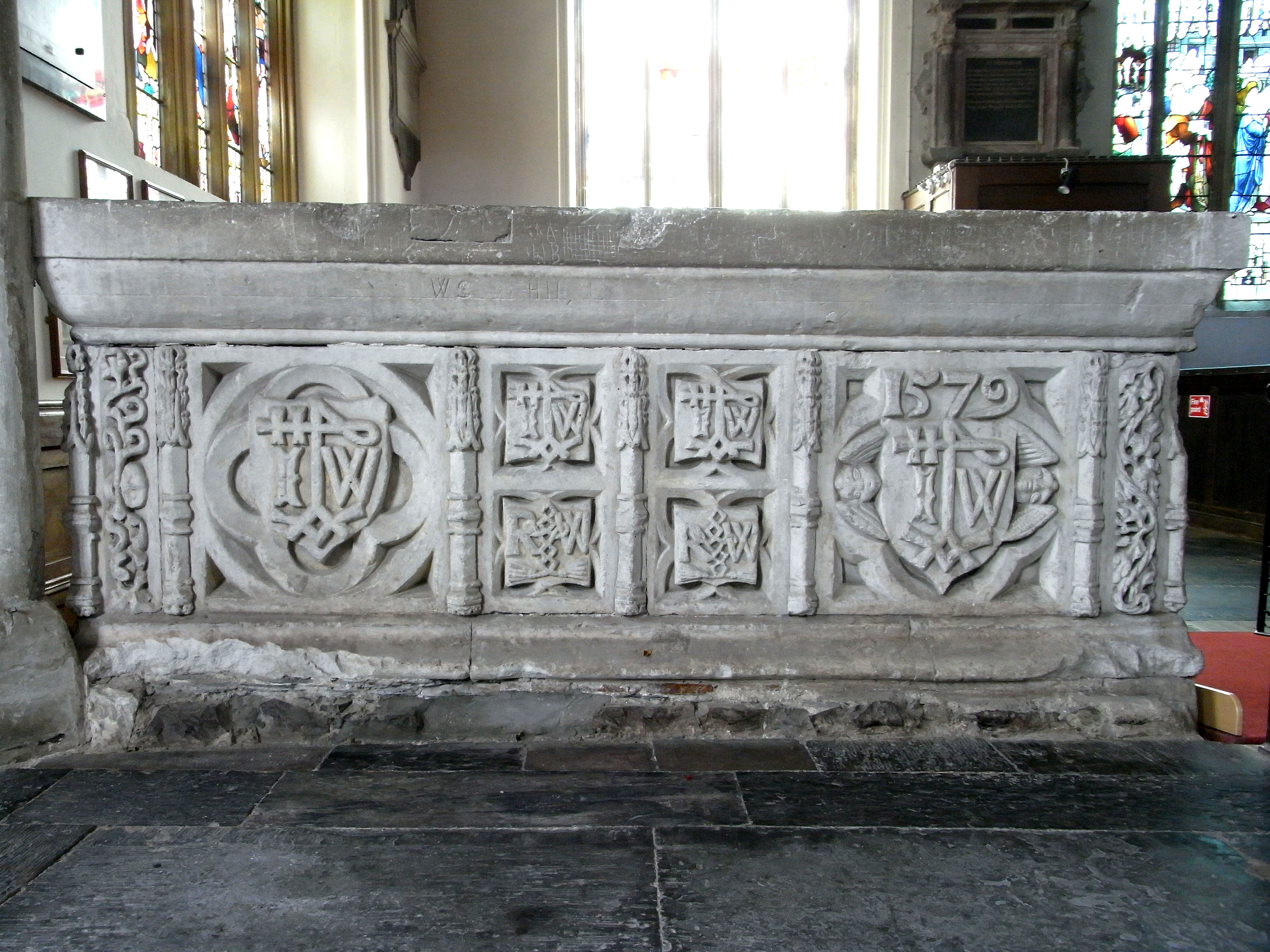
Chest tomb of John Waldron, St Peter's Church, Tiverton, showing his merchant's mark and the date "1579". On the lower level are shown the initials "RW" for his wife Richord

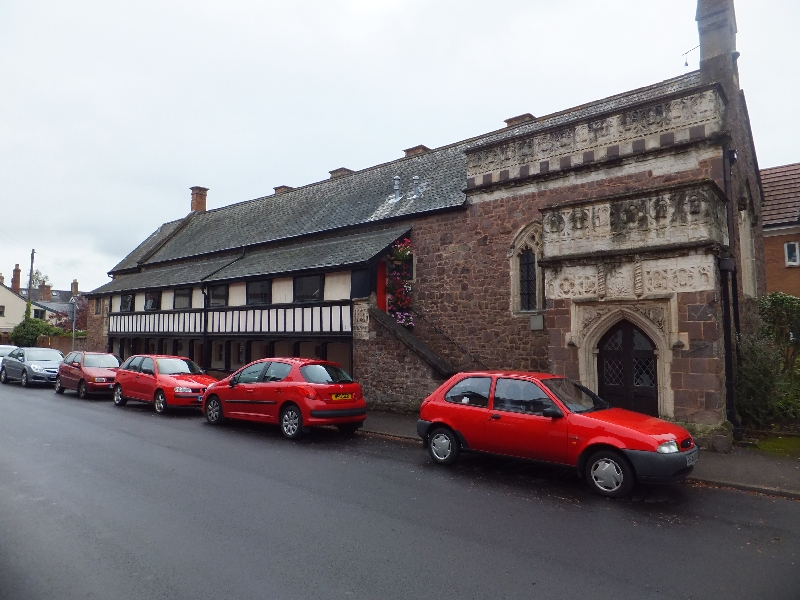
Waldron's Almshouses, Wellbrook Street, Tiverton. The chapel is at the west end of the building (right)

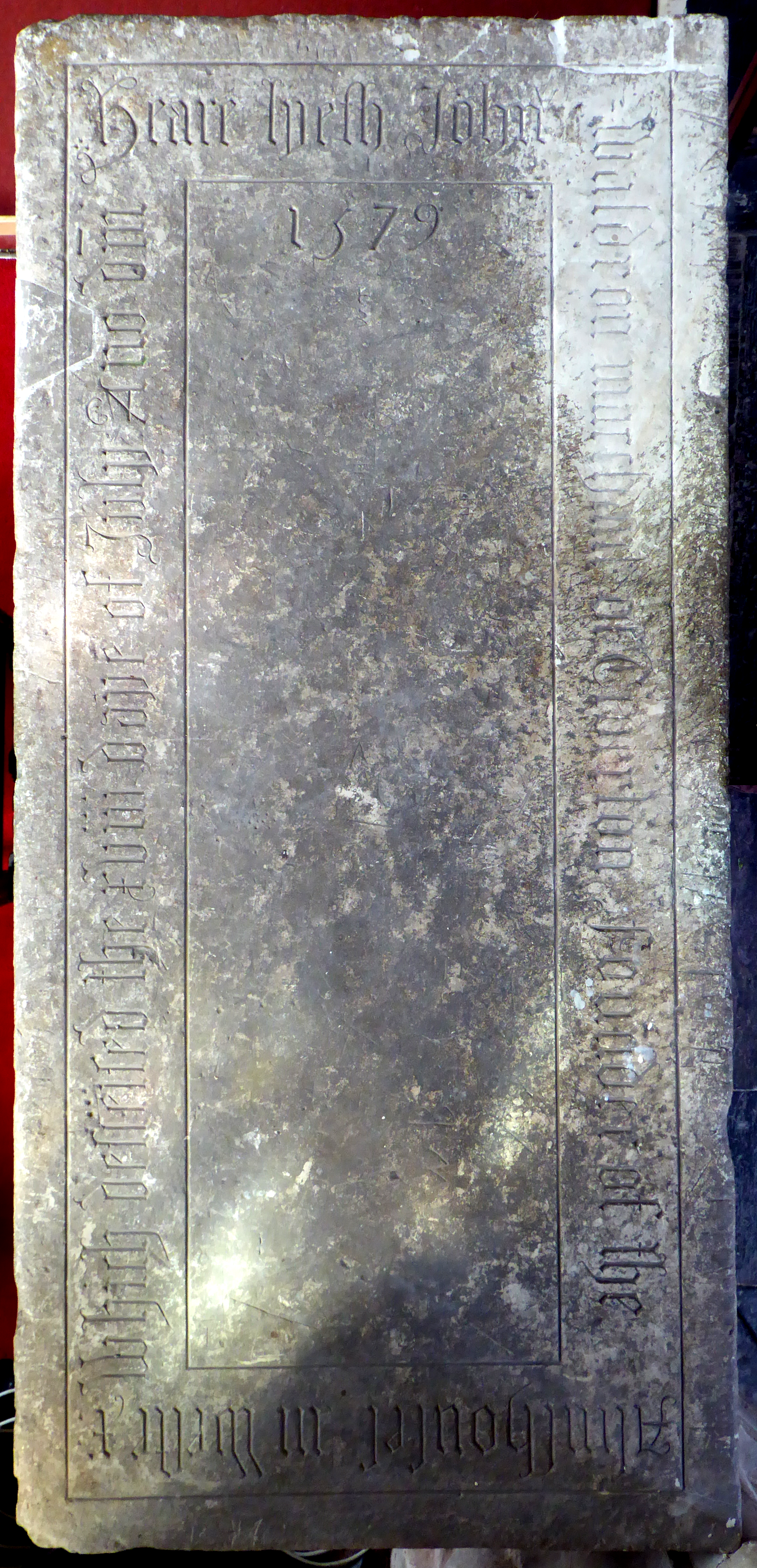
Ledger stone of John Waldron in St Peter's Church, Tiverton, inscribed: "Heare lyeth John Waldron Marchant of Tiverton founder of the almshouses in West x which deccessed the xviii daye of July An(n)o D(omi)ni 1579"

John Waldron (died 18 July 1579) of Tiverton in Devon, England, was a wealthy merchant who founded and endowed the surviving grade II* listed "Waldron's Almshouses" and Chapel on the outskirts of Tiverton. His elaborately sculpted chest tomb survives in St Peter's Church, Tiverton, at the east end of the south aisle, still in an entirely Gothic style (long after the Renaissance style entered England) with a Gothic black-letter inscription on the ledger stone on top, and showing on the base Gothic pinnacled niches and within quatrefoils escutcheons displaying his merchant's mark. His name is sometimes confused with "Walrond" a prominent and ancient gentry family long seated at Bradfield House in the parish of Uffculme, Devon, about 6 miles east of Tiverton. The spelling "Waldron" is clearly shown incised in Gothic letters on the ledger stone on top of his chest tomb.

== Marriage ==
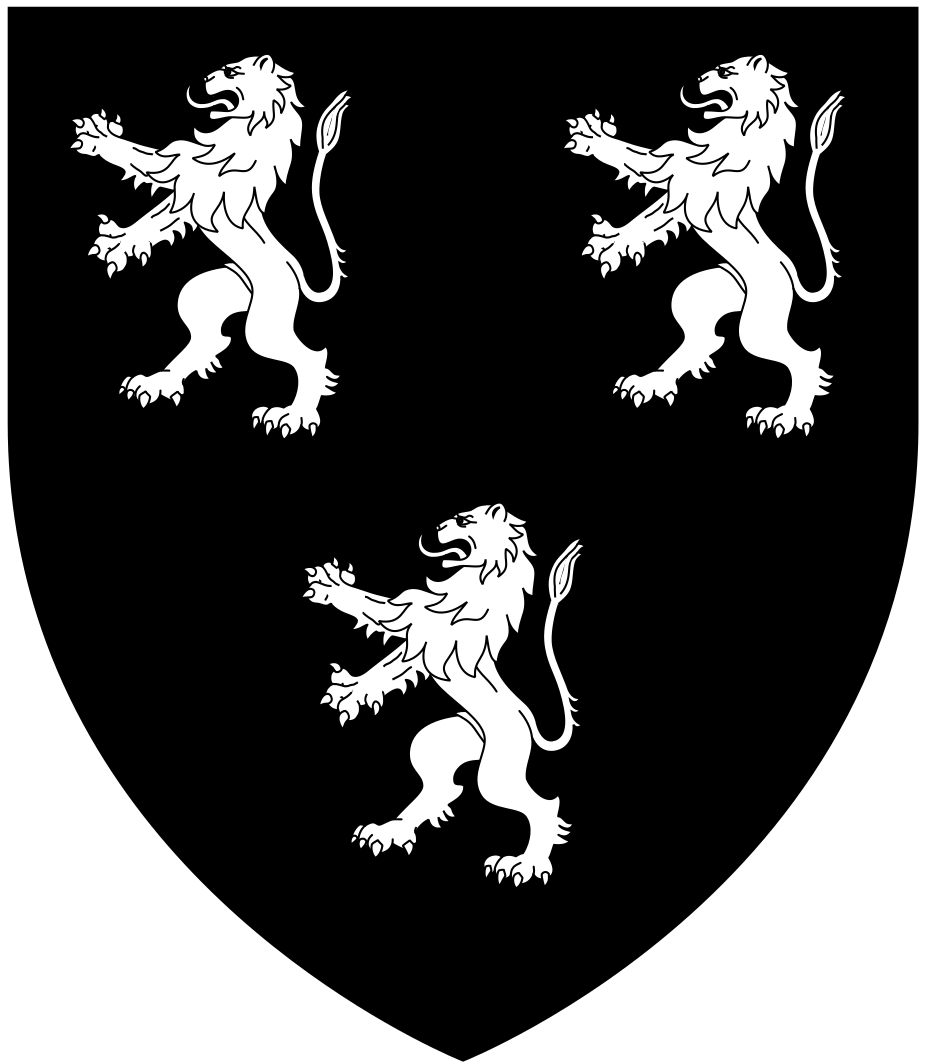
Arms of Prouse: Sable, three lions rampant argent

He married Richarda Prowse (d.1604), a daughter of John Prowse (d.1586) the elder, of Tiverton, Clothier and Gentleman, and a sister of Robert Prowse (d.1591) of Barnstaple, Merchant and Mayor of Barnstaple in 1588. The Prowse family was a very ancient Devonshire gentry family, descended from a daughter of William de Redvers, Earl of Devon, of Tiverton Castle. She survived her husband and soon after his death remarried on 4 May 1580 (as his 3rd wife) Roger Gifford (1533-1603) of Tiverton Castle, whose mural monument survives in St Peter's Church, Tiverton, on the north wall of the chancel. Roger Gifford was a younger son of the ancient gentry family of Gifford of Brightley, Chittlehamton, Devon, who following the fall of the Courtenay Earls of Devon (heirs of the de Redvers Earls of Devon), purchased their seat of Tiverton Castle from their heirs. Richarda was buried at Tiverton on 28 December 1604.

== Charitable works ==
=== Trustee of "Tyrrell's Gift" ===
Waldron's earliest recorded involvement in charitable activity was his acting as a trustee of "Tyrrell's Gift To The Poor", being a bequest of £200 made by Walter Tyrrell in his will dated 20 May 1568. Waldron was one of the overseers of the will, by which he was granted discretion to purchase land annuities or yearly rents "for the maintenance and relief of some of the poor people of the town and parish of Tiverton. Waldron executed a deed poll dated 18 September 1575 by which he gave, granted and confirmed to John Waldron, junior, and Thomas Boutey, guardians of Tiverton Church, and to their successors and to ten other persons an annuity or yearly rent of £10 and 13 shillings to be issuing out of certain messuages and lands in Tiverton, to hold the same annuity unto the said guardians and their successors, and to the said trustees and their heirs for ever. And he appointed, that the said church gnardians and their successors should collect and receive the said rent of £10 13 shillings out of the said lands, and dispose of the same weekly among six of the most needy, poor, impotent and indigent persons of the said town and parish, by them to be nominated and chosen; that is to say, eight pence a week, to each, making in the whole £10 8 shillings, the churchwardens, or as many of them as should execute the trusts, retaining the remaining five shillings between them for their pains; such payments to be made weekly to the poor persons so appointed, and to continue for their lives, unless they should he guilty of some notorions crime, or be of dissolute lives, in which case some others should be appointed in their rooms; and it was directed, that when the trustees should he reduced to three, the survivors should convey the annuity to eight other trustees, together with the churchwardens".

=== Waldron's Almshouses ===
By a deed poll dated 19 October 1577 "John Waldron of Tiverton, Merchant" gave to the two churchwardens of St Peter's Church, Tiverton, and to eight further trustees, an annuity of £24, payable quarterly out of his manor of Daccombe (near Paignton) and from all his lands in Tiverton. They were to distribute it weekly to "eight of the most needy, poor, impotent and indigent persons of the town of Tiverton, by them to be appointed", to every one 12 pence per week. "The poor persons should be entitled for life, unless they should be guilty of any crime or be of dissolute life". The remainder was to go to the trustees as remuneration.

== Almshouse building ==
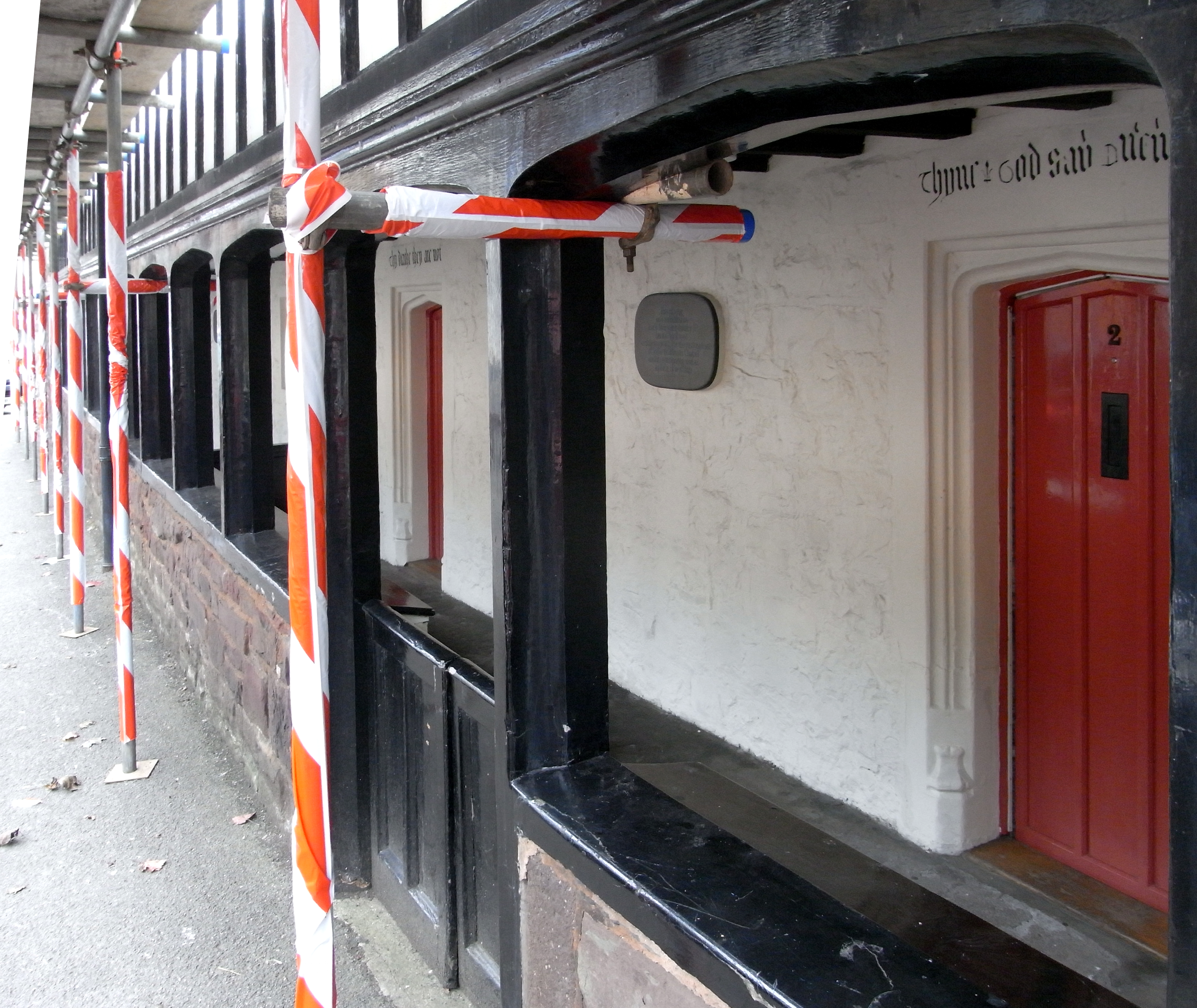
Waldron's Almshouses, entrances to ground floor rooms

The Almshouse was built in open fields on the outskirts of the town of Tiverton, near the "Wellbrook" stream. The town has since greatly expanded to surround the site, and "Wellbrook Street" now runs past the Almshouses. A large modern complex of charitable housing was built in the 20th century to the rear of the Almshouses by the "Tiverton Almshouse Trust". The two-storey Almshouse occupies the eastern part of the building and was designed for 8 "poor, impotent and indigent" men of Tiverton, each occupying a single room. The upper floor is reached by an external staircase leading to a covered gallery landing. In 1847 they were in "a most dilapidated state", as described by Harding in his History of Tiverton. They were restored in 1987, as is recorded on a plaque inscribed:

"This plaque was unveiled by the Earl of Halsbury FRS, F.Eng., on 6th March 1987 to mark the restoration of these 16th century Almshouses".

The exterior of Waldron's Almshouses is decorated with profuse relief sculpture. An inscription in Gothic lettering across the front elevation under eaves is as follows:

""John Waldron merchant and Richord his wife builded this house in the time of their life. At such tyme as the walls were fourtyne foote hye. He departed this world even the eyghtynth of July 1579".

"Since youth and life doth passe awaye,
And death at hand to end our dayes,
Let us do so that men may saye:
We spent our goods God to preys.
He that upon the poore doth spende
The goods that he hath heare,
To God agen the same doth send
And paye the same with great increase".

Above the lintels of the doors on the ground floor are painted the following three sentences: "Depart thy goods whyle thou hast tyme; For after thy death they are not thyne; God sav Quen Elizabeth".

== Chapel ==
The chapel occupies the western part of the building. It has a projecting porch to the west with a moulded doorway with carved spandrels. The porch is surmounted by a stone parapet, profusely decorated with relief sculpture, including ships and elephants, indicating Waldron's membership of the Guinea Company and his involvement in the Ivory trade. Another parapet at roof level is similarly decorated. On the exterior wall of the Chapel is a small black tablet inscribed:

"This plaque was unveiled by Lady Margaret Amory, JP, on 11th April 1990 in thanksgiving for the restoration of John Waldron's Chapel and its continuing use as a place of worship".

The bell measuring about 18 inches in diameter, was made in 1539 by Aelbert Hackman in the Duchy of Cleves in the Holy Roman Empire. It is the oldest bell in Devon to bear a date in its inscription. The engraved inscription between two decorative friezes reads as follows: "In the year 1539 Aelbert Hackman cast me in Cleve. Jesus, Mary, Ann". This was therefore one year before Anne of Cleves became the fourth wife of King Henry VIII.

== Landholdings ==
His landholdings included the following:

- Colridge, Devon, rectory of, which in partnership with Robert Northcote the elder of Crediton, he purchased in fee simple from the crown on 26 January, "to hold in free socage issues from All Saints last, the advowsons of the Vicarage reserved".

== Death ==
He died on 18 July 1579, as is recorded on the sculpted inscription on his almshouses, and his will, in which he calls himself "John Waldron, Gentleman, of Tiverton", was proved on 14 August 1579.
