= Peter Blundell =

English clothier (c. 1520–1601)

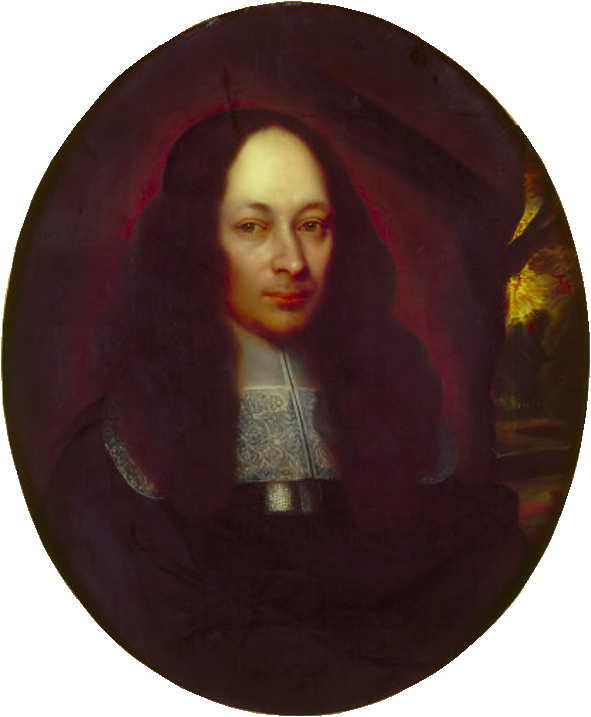
- Portrait of Peter Blundell, property of Blundell's School
- Born: 1520
- Died: 1601 (aged 80–81)
- Occupation: Clothier

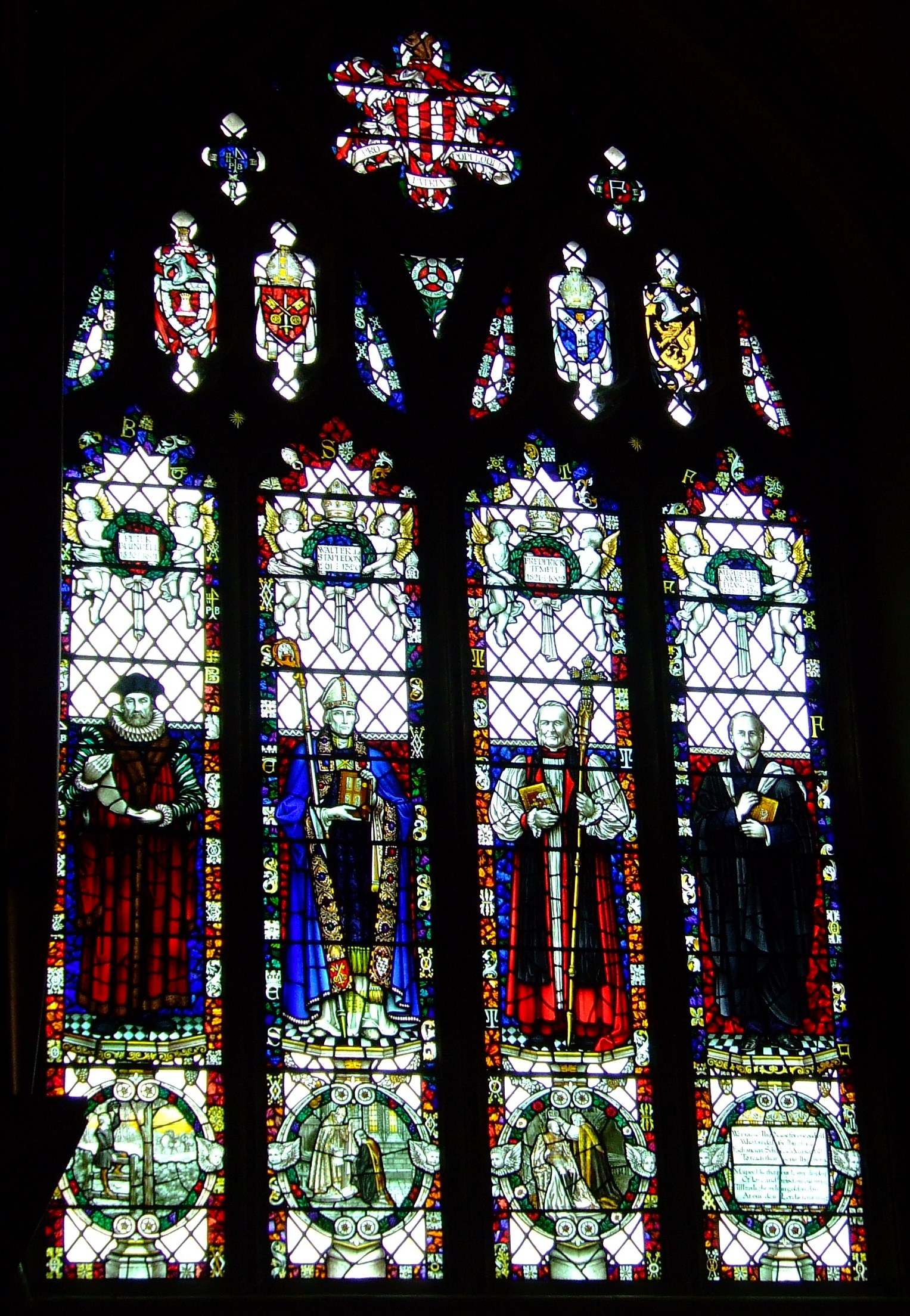
Peter Blundell (left), with arms in apex above and merchant's mark in border, modern stained glass window in chapel of Blundell's School

Peter Blundell (c. 1520–1601) was a prosperous clothier, trading between Tiverton, Devon, and London. He died in April 1601, never having married and with no known issue. On his death, he left over £32,000 cash to fellow clothiers and their families, his employees, created several charitable trusts, and gave £2400 to build Blundell's School in Tiverton, to be a free grammar school.

Blundell also left £2000 in his will for the endowment of six scholars from The School in Divinity at the Universities of Oxford and Cambridge; arrangements were made for Blundell Scholars to enter Balliol and Sidney Sussex colleges respectively.

He was buried on 9 May 1601 at St Michael Paternoster Royal in London.

Blundell Park in Cleethorpes, the ground of Grimsby Town Football Club since 1899, is named after Peter Blundell, whose money enabled Sidney Sussex College to buy the land in 1616.

== Bibliography ==
- Blundell, Joseph Hight; Hight Blundell (1912). The Blundells of Bedfordshire and Northamptonshire. by subscription of family members.
