= Tiverton High School =

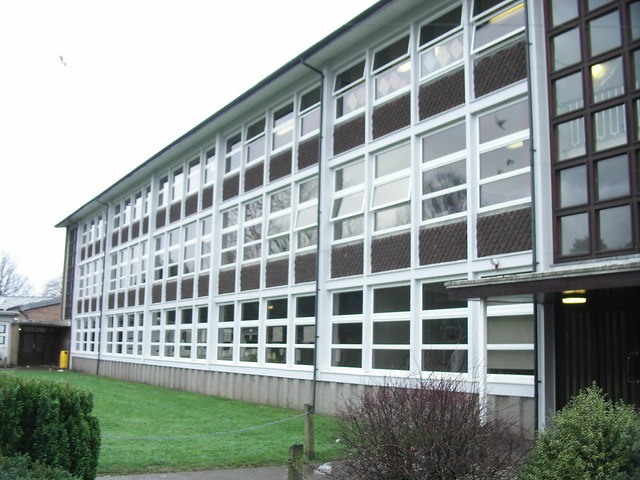

Location
- Bolham Road; Tiverton, Devon; England
- Coordinates: 50°54′39″N 3°29′36″W

Information
- Type: Foundation school
- Local authority: Devon
- Department for Education URN: 113548 Tables
- Ofsted: Reports
- Headteacher: Nicky Lewis
- Gender: Coeducational
- Age: 11 to 16
- Enrolment: 1200
- Website: http://tiverton.devon.sch.uk/

Tiverton High School is a state secondary school located in Tiverton, Devon, England. It is located on the outskirts of the town, and has a close working relationship with the co-sited Petroc (formerly East Devon College).

The school currently has approximately 1,200 pupils aged 11–16; the school's capacity is 1425.

== History ==
The school can trace its origins back to 1609 when it was founded thanks to a legacy from the wealthy Tiverton wool and cloth merchant, Robert Chilcott. His will directed his executors "to erect and build a school house the walls and covering thereof to be of stone". This building in St Peter's Street served as the school until 1842, and still stands. For a time it was the home of the Tiverton Museum.

Chilcott was a nephew of, and originally a clerk to, Peter Blundell, another renowned wool merchant in the town, who also left a legacy to start a 'free school' for Tiverton. Blundell's institution went on to become the fee-paying Blundell's School, Chilcott's eventually developed – with other additional charity schools and benefactors – to become the Tiverton Grammar School.

Chilcott's school only admitted boys, but girls were admitted at another establishment, the Blue Coat or Bluecoat School, thanks to public subscription and fundraising.
Following the 1868 Public Schools Act, the Taunton Report of the same year and a Charity Commissioners Scheme for the re-organisation of 'secondary education' in Tiverton, the schools were dissolved and their buildings and endowments used for the establishment of the Tiverton Middle Schools. Further reform came with the Education Acts of 1902 (which created secondary schools) and 1906. The Girls' School, the Boys' Middle School, the Chilcott Educational Foundation and the School of Arts and Science came together in a new building in Barrington Street, providing education for about 150 boys and girls, separately until 1953.

The current site at Bolham Road was built in 1960 as a Secondary Modern School - The Heathcoat Secondary Modern School. The Barrington Street site was retained as a Grammar School until the re-organisation of 1977-78.

Further wholesale re-organisation of education came in 1977–78, when much of Devon adopted comprehensive education and a three-tier model of First, Middle and Senior schools. Tiverton Grammar School pupils joined their peers at Heathcoat Secondary School on Bolham Road in a new merged, comprehensive school then known simply as Tiverton School, now renamed Tiverton High School.

The status of the school was an important issue in the 2022 Tiverton and Honiton by-election. In particular, the bad condition of the roof and its propensity to leaks were deemed to be in need of attention. The same year, the school acquired land on a new site to allow for expansion.
