= Tiverton, Devon =

Town in Devon, England

Coordinates: 50.903°N 3.488°W

Tiverton
- Market town and civil parish
- Tiverton Town Hall

- Location within Devon
- Population: 22,291 (2021 Census)
- OS grid reference: SS955125
- Civil parish: Tiverton
- District: Mid Devon
- Shire county: Devon
- Region: South West
- Country: England
- Sovereign state: United Kingdom
- Post town: TIVERTON
- Postcode district: EX16
- Dialling code: 01884
- Police: Devon and Cornwall
- Fire: Devon and Somerset
- Ambulance: South Western
- UK Parliament: Tiverton and Minehead

Tiverton (/ˈtɪvərtən/ TIV-ər-tən) is a market town and civil parish in Devon, England, It is the commercial and administrative centre of the Mid Devon district, and lies on the River Exe, approximately 46 miles (74 km) north-east of Plymouth, 12 miles (19 km) north of Exeter, 18 miles (29 km) west-southwest of Taunton, and 38 miles (61 km) south-southwest of Weston-super-Mare. It had a population of 22,291 at the 2021 census, which was previously estimated at 20,587 in 2019.

== History ==
=== Early history ===
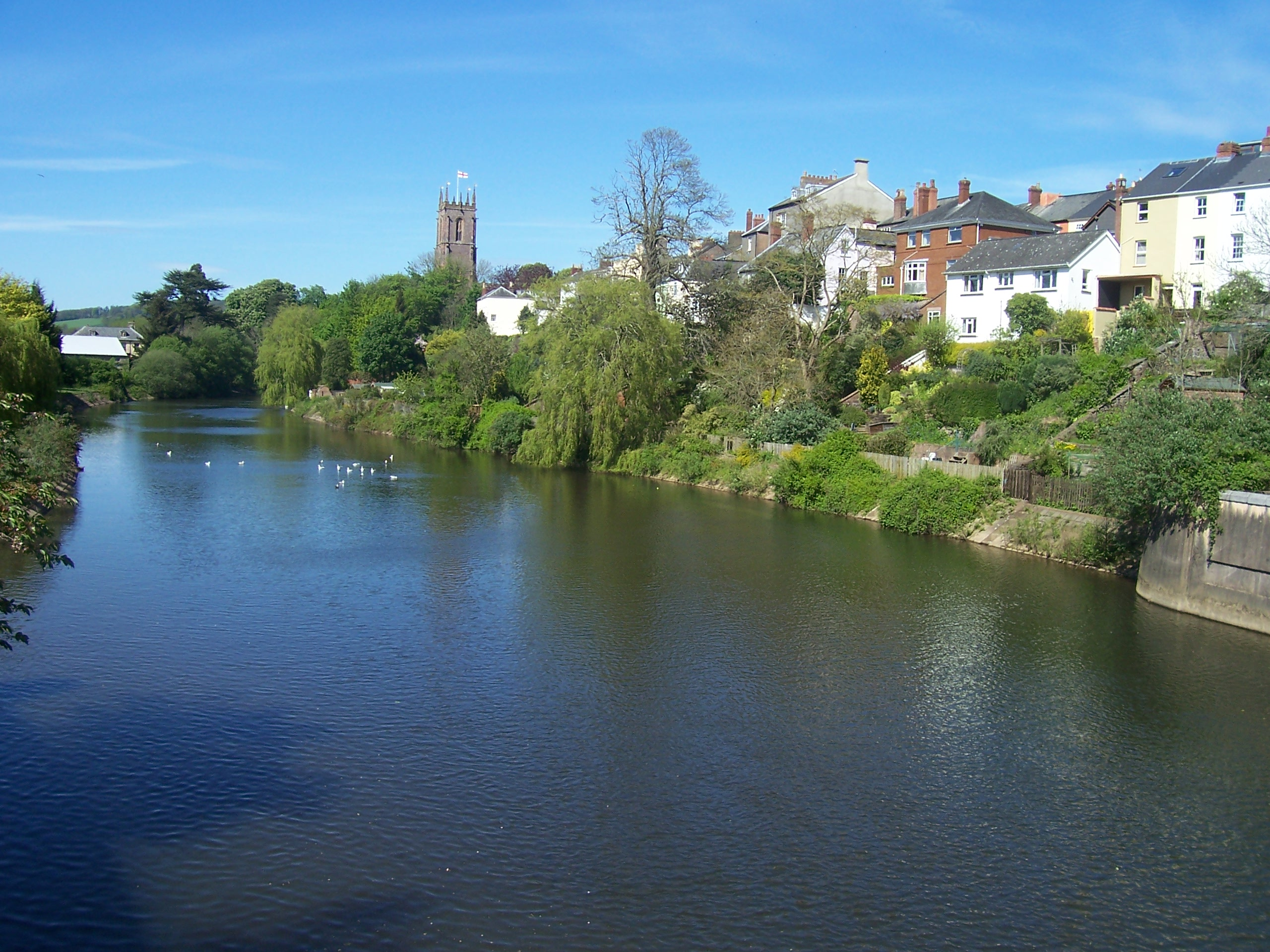
View from the bridge over the Exe looking towards the St Peter's church

The town's name is conjectured to derive from "Twy-ford-ton" or "Twyverton", meaning "the town on two fords", and was historically referred to as "Twyford". The town stands at the confluence of the rivers Exe and Lowman. Human occupation in the area dates back to the Stone Age, with many flint tools found in the area. An Iron Age hill fort, Cranmore Castle, stands at the top of Exeter Hill above the town, and a Roman fort or marching camp was discovered on the hillside below Knightshayes Court near Bolham, just to the north of the town. In 2026 excavation of a Roman villa was begun in Halberton.

Tiverton formed part of the inheritance of Aethelweard, youngest son of King Alfred. Countess Gytha of Wessex controlled the town in 1066 and the Domesday Book indicates that William the Conqueror was its tenant-in-chief in 1086. Tiverton was also the seat of the court of the hundred of Tiverton. It was the strategic site chosen by Henry I for a Norman castle, Tiverton Castle, first built as a Motte and Bailey in 1106.

Tiverton has a medieval town leat, built for it by Countess Isabella de Fortibus, who was the eldest daughter of Baldwin de Redvers, 6th Earl of Devon and grew up at Tidcombe Hall, close to Tiverton. Isabella also controlled the Port of Topsham, Devon, through which much of Tiverton's woollen exports were transported, mostly to the Low Countries. Every seven years there is a Perambulation of the Town Leat: a ceremony to clear the path of the leat and ensure it is kept running. The leat can be seen in Castle Street, where it runs down the centre of the road, and at Coggan's Well, in Fore Street.

Tiverton owes its early growth and prosperity to the wool trade, which caused the town to grow rapidly in the 16th and 17th centuries. Many wealthy wool merchants added to the town's heritage. John Greenway (1460–1529), for example, built a chapel and porch onto St Peter's parish church in 1517, and a small chapel and almshouses in Gold Street, which still stand – the Almshouse Trust still houses people today. Peter Blundell, another wealthy merchant, who died in 1601, bequeathed the funds and land for Blundell's School to educate local children. It was founded in Tiverton in 1604 and relocated to its present location on the outskirts of town in 1882, where it functions as an independent school. John Waldron (died 1579) founded Waldron's Almshouses, on Wellbrook Street, and his elaborate chest tomb survives in St Peter's Church.

Around the turn of the 17th century, there were two major fires in the town. The first, allegedly started in a frying pan, was in 1596 and destroyed most of the town. The second, in 1612, was known as the "dog-fight fire" – a dog fight had distracted those meant to be looking after a furnace. The parish registers of Barnstaple reported of the second fire: "In the yere of o^{r} Lorde God 1612 in the 5th daye of the month of Auguste was the towne of Teverton burned the second tyme w^{th} fyer to the nomber of 260 dwellynge howses."

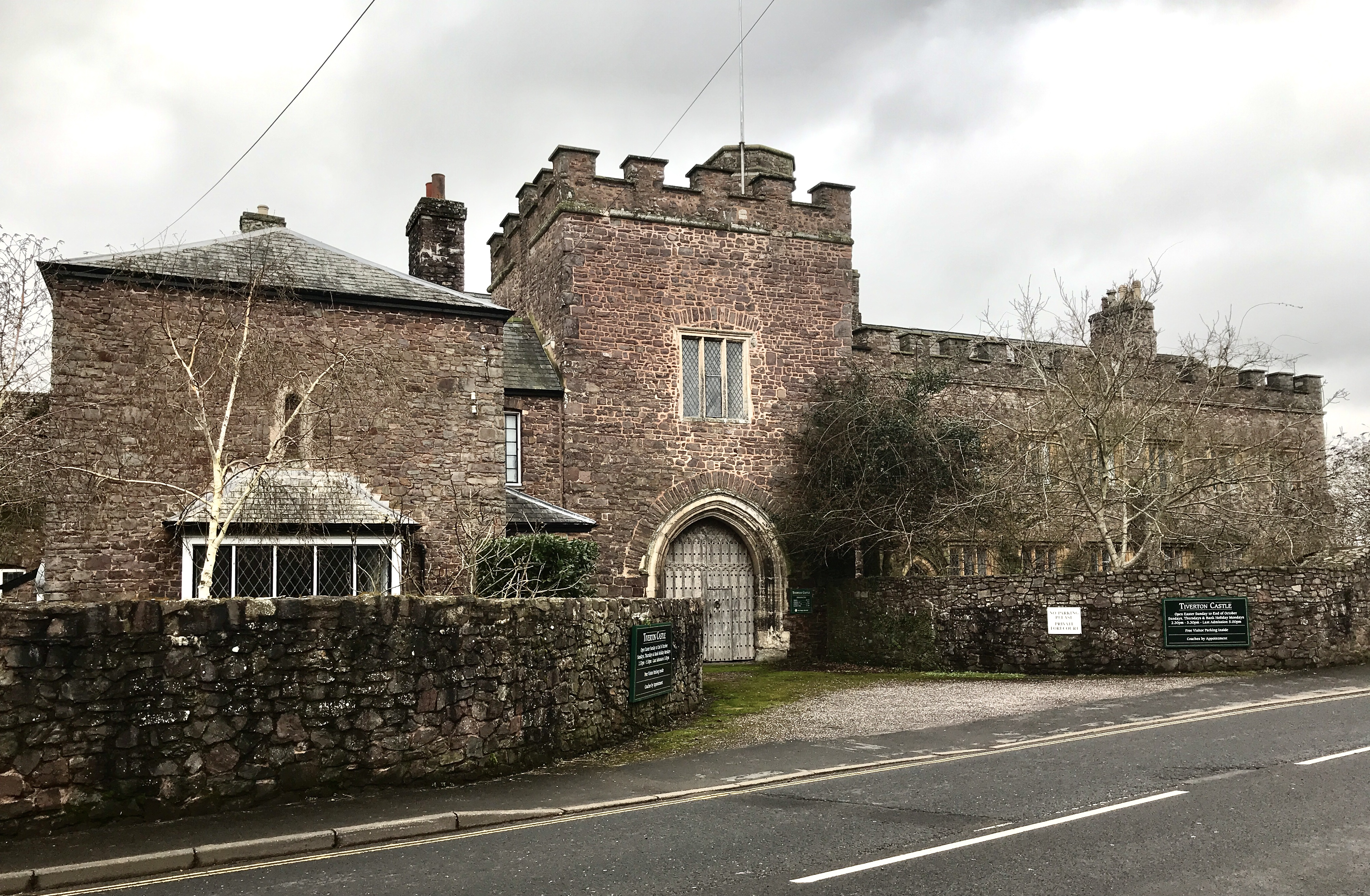
Tiverton Castle in 2021

During the English Civil War in 1645 Tiverton Castle, held by the Royalists, was the scene of a relatively brief siege by Thomas Fairfax's Parliamentarian forces. The Parliamentarian forces entered Tiverton under Major General Massey on 15 October, the town's defenders fleeing before him towards Exeter. They left a defending force in the castle and church. Fairfax arrived from Cullompton on 17 October, set up his artillery and bombarded the castle for two days, ceasing fire for the sabbath in the afternoon of Saturday 18 October. On Sunday Fairfax had "several great pieces" of artillery brought up, ready for a renewed barrage on Monday, which commenced at 7 a.m. The siege was ended when a lucky shot broke one of the drawbridge chains and an alert squad of Roundheads gained swift entry.

=== Historic governance ===
From the early 17th century until the mid-19th century, Tiverton was governed by the Tiverton Corporation, a self-selecting body established by royal charter in 1615 under King James I. The Corporation consisted of a mayor, aldermen, and councillors who exercised control over local justice, taxation, markets, education, and charitable endowments. It played a prominent role in regulating the town's wool trade and public infrastructure. In the late 18th century, the Corporation became closely associated with the political interests of the Ryder family, later the Earls of Harrowby, who dominated parliamentary representation and civic appointments.

The Corporation was reformed and ultimately abolished under the Municipal Corporations Act 1835, after which an elected borough council was established.

=== 18th and 19th centuries ===
The town enjoyed prosperity from the wool trade in the early 18th century. However, a period of decline followed during the early Industrial Revolution. There were occasional riots, and societies of woolcombers and weavers were formed in an effort to protect jobs and wages. By the end of the century, imports of cotton and the expansion of industrialization elsewhere, along with the effect of the Napoleonic Wars on exports, took the town's woollen industry into terminal decline. In June 1731 another fire destroyed 298 houses, causing £58,000 worth of damage. After this, the streets were widened. In May 1738, riots broke out in the town.

The industrialist John Heathcoat bought an old woollen mill on the river Exe in 1815, and after the destruction of his machinery at Loughborough by former Luddites thought to be in the pay of Nottingham lacemakers, he moved his whole lace-making operation to Tiverton. Many of his workers walked from Loughborough to Tiverton, a distance of at least 200 miles. The factory turned the fortunes of Tiverton again, making it an early industrial centre in the South West. Trade was aided when a branch of the Grand Western Canal from Tiverton to Lowdwells was opened in 1814, with an extension to Taunton in 1838. This was followed by a branch of the Great Western Railway in 1848. The population at the time of the 1841 census was 7,769 inhabitants. Tiverton Town Hall, elaborately designed by Henry Lloyd, was completed in 1864.

Although small, Tiverton had two members of Parliament. As one of the "rotten boroughs" it was often targeted by those seeking electoral reform. Lord Palmerston, or "Pam" as he was known locally, was an MP for Tiverton for much of the 19th century. In 1847, the Chartists, a radical group seeking to change the electoral system, stood one of their leaders, George Julian Harney, against Palmerston. He is widely reported as having gained no votes – but in fact he won the "popular vote" (a show of hands of the people of the town) and withdrew when Palmerston called a ballot, aware that he would lose in a vote by only 400 wealthy and propertied in the town out of a population of 7,000. Broadening the franchise was one of the Chartist objectives. After the Reform Act 1867, Tiverton had a single MP, held for a long period by a member of the Heathcoat-Amory family, who own much of the land and property surrounding Tiverton, most recently by Derick Heathcoat-Amory who served from 1945 to 1960. Up until 2010 David Heathcoat-Amory was the MP for Wells in nearby Somerset.

The town was the last in the Devon and Cornwall area to retain an independent police force, until 1945. In the second half of the 20th century, Tiverton again declined slowly, as the Heathcoat factory became ever more mechanised and the Starkey Knight & Ford brewery was taken over by Whitbread as its regional brewery, but later closed, becoming just a bottling plant located in Howden (now Aston Manor cider makers). The factory lay derelict for some years before being demolished to make way for a supermarket. The manufacture of agricultural machinery adjacent to the River Lowman dwindled, the railway closed in 1964 and the Globe Elastic plant in Kennedy Way closed in the 1980s. However, a few far-sighted individuals, notably William Authers, secured some important assets for the future. Tiverton Museum was opened, the track bed of the old railway was bought to provide footpaths and an adventure playground, and the Grand Western Canal was saved from dereliction as a country park.

The building of the Southern Relief Road (now Great Western Way) led to the closure of Fore Street in the town centre to all but pedestrians.

=== 20th and 21st centuries ===
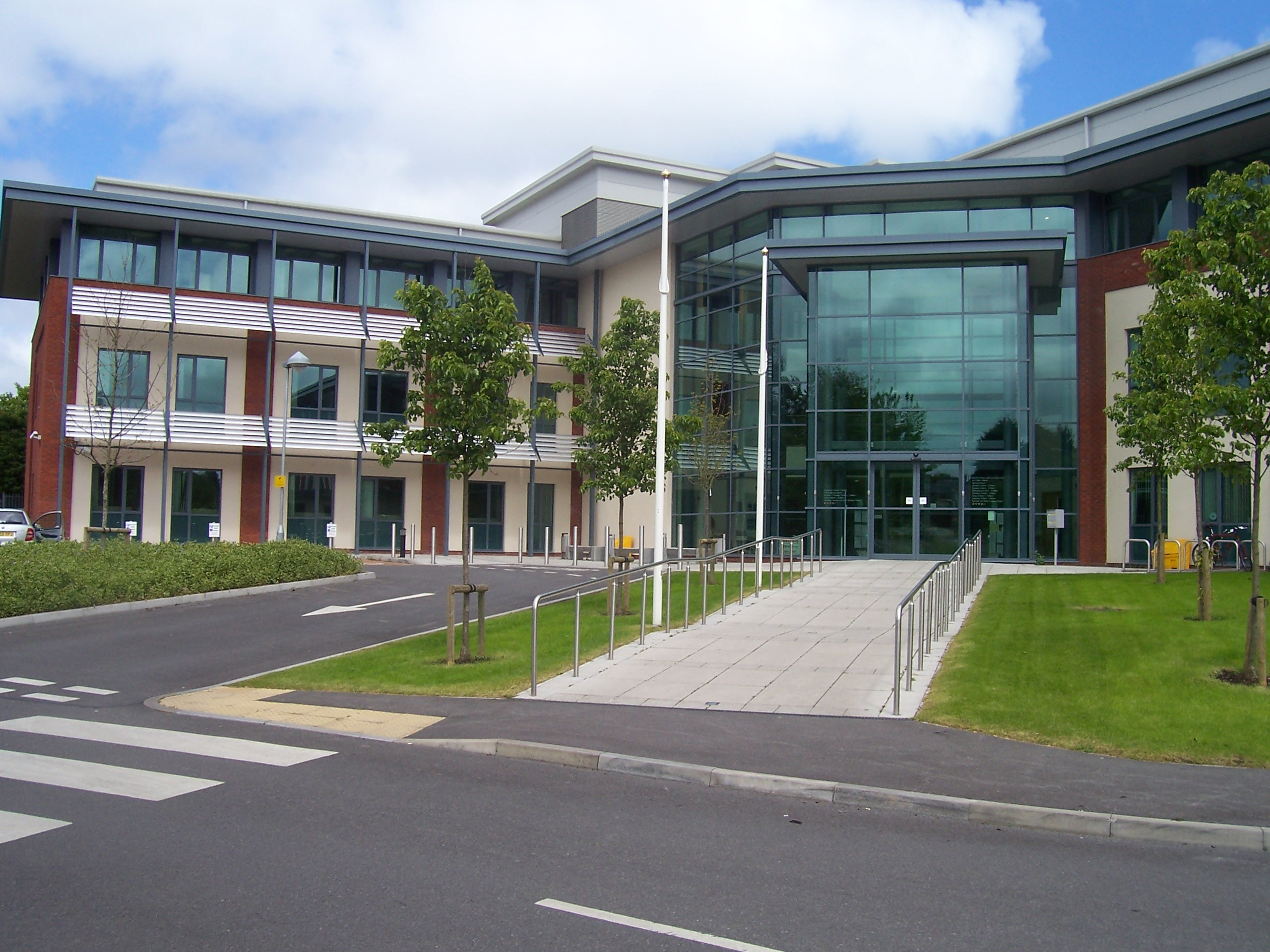
Tiverton Library and council offices 2007

Tiverton's revival in recent years began with the construction of the A361 (the North Devon Link Road) in the late 1980s. In the 1990s, an industrial estate was built at Little Gornhay on the north-eastern edge of the town and a junction was added to the Link Road, with a distributor road (now the A396) into the town that has become its main gateway. Great Western Way, linking this road to the Exeter Road along the line of the old railway, was also constructed.

Demand has driven up housing prices, particularly in the South-West. Many now look to towns on the periphery of employment centres. Tiverton has become a dormitory town for commuters to Exeter and Taunton, with its growth supported by large housing projects to the north of the town by most national house builders, including Westbury Homes, Barrett Homes and Bellway Homes. The resulting influx has brought further development of the town's services and shops. Tiverton's outmoded swimming pool was replaced by a new leisure centre near the main campus of the East Devon College consisting of a swimming pool and gymnasium. Mid Devon District Council moved in December 2003 to new offices at Phoenix House, at the foot of Phoenix Lane, close to the site of a disused brewery. The town has a newly built Tiverton and District Hospital funded by the Private Finance Initiative, which opened in May 2004.

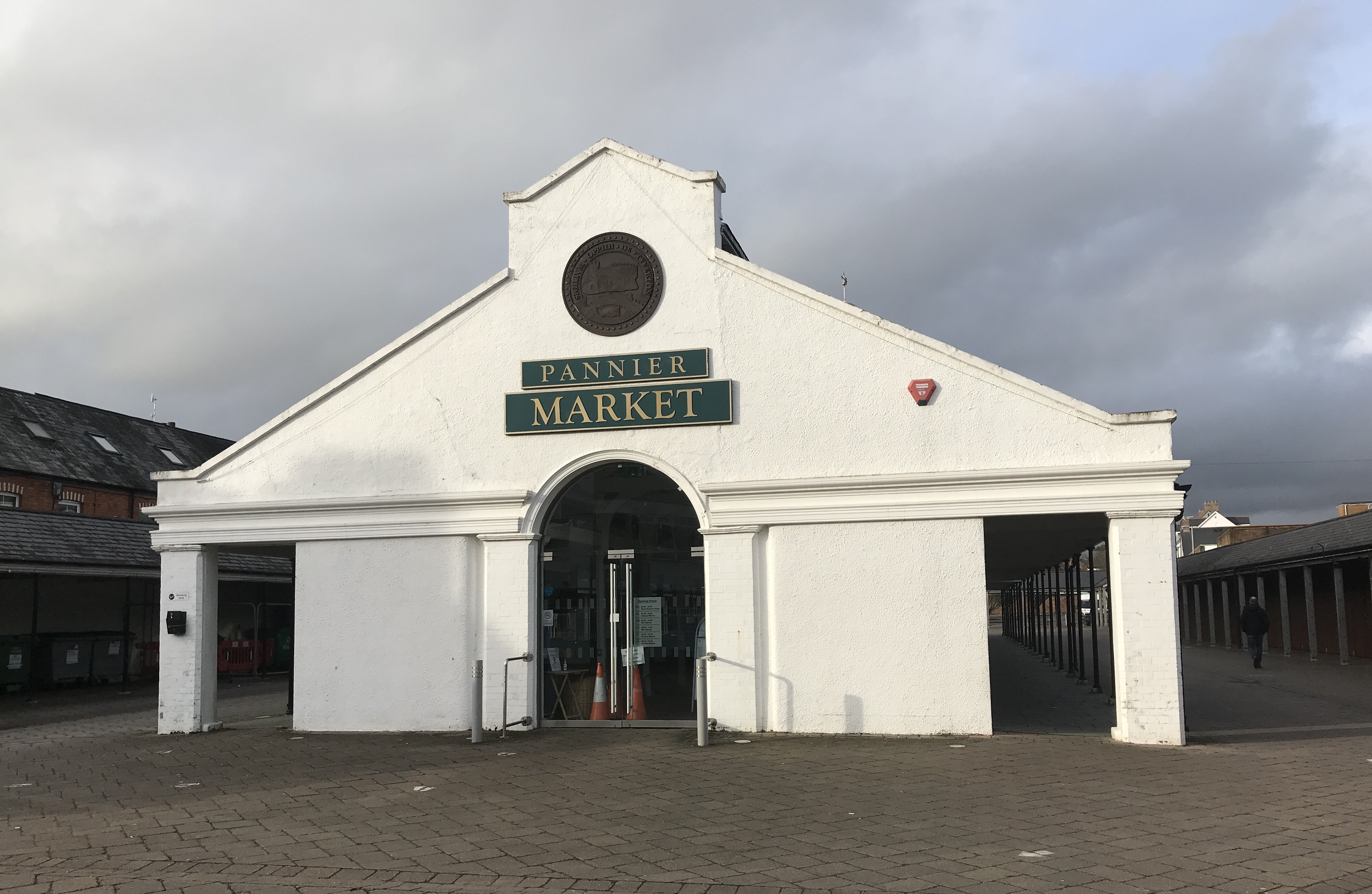
Tiverton Pannier Market in 2021

The Pannier Market in the town was redeveloped at a cost of over £3 million, alongside its car park and minor shopping precinct, increasing market capacity and allowing markets to be held more frequently: the work was completed in April 2006.

In 2007 the former cinema, the Electric, was bulldozed for redevelopment as housing, while the only operative cinema, the Tivoli, which had been mostly run by volunteers, closed its doors and the site was put up for sale. After a well-supported public campaign, the Tivoli reopened on 28 June 2008, bought by Merlin Cinemas.

Tiverton as the venue for the annual Mid Devon Show won one of 15 positions in the Round 2 pilot scheme as a Portas Town in 2018.

== Education ==
- Blundell's School, an independent coeducational day and boarding school
- Bolham Primary School
- The Castle Primary School, formerly in the old Grammar School building, but replaced by a new build in 2017, the old building being demolished
- East Anstey County Primary School
- Halberton Primary School
- Heathcoat Primary School, member of the Federation of Tiverton Schools
- Petroc College, formerly East Devon College, a further education college sharing a campus with Tiverton High School
- Rackenford Primary School, member of the Federation of Tiverton Schools
- St John's Roman Catholic Primary School
- Tidcombe Primary School, once a state school, now an academy
- Tiverton High School, the local community secondary school and a specialist visual arts college belonging to the Federation of Tiverton Schools
- Two Moors Primary School
- Wilcombe Primary School, once a state school, now part of an academy with 12 other Devon primaries
- Witheridge V. P. (C) School

== Transport ==
=== Road ===
Tiverton has easy access to the M5 motorway. The town's revival in recent years began with the construction of the A361 North Devon Link Road in the late 1980s.

=== Coach ===
National Express operates coach services in and out of Tiverton bus station towards London and North Devon.

Up till 11 January 2023, Tiverton was served twice daily by the London Superfast Service of Berry's Coaches.

=== Rail ===
The Bristol and Exeter Railway opened a station known as Tiverton Road on 1 May 1844. It was renamed Tiverton Junction on 12 June 1848, when Tiverton railway station was opened nearer the town at the end of a branch from the Junction station. A second branch, the Exe Valley line reached this station from the south, branching off the London to Penzance main line at Stoke Canon and following the River Exe. Mainline trains were occasionally diverted via Tiverton if there was engineering work or damage on the section north of Stoke Canon. Another line headed north to join the Taunton–Barnstaple line at Dulverton. None of these lines remain.

In 1986, Tiverton Parkway railway station opened on the main line on the site of the old Sampford Peverell station, to replace the junction station a few miles down the line at Willand. As a parkway station, it stands six miles east of the town, alongside Junction 27 of the M5 motorway. Its proximity to the motorway – and the relative inaccessibility of Exeter St Davids railway station – means that the station is often used as a coach exchange when the line between Exeter and Plymouth is closed.

=== Canal ===
The Grand Western Canal from Taunton to Tiverton opened in 1838.

=== Bus ===
Most bus services are run by Stagecoach South West. Stagecoach offers a half-hourly, Monday to Saturday services to Exeter via the A396, with a two-hourly service on Sundays and Bank Holidays; and an hourly service to Exeter via Cullompton on Mondays to Saturdays. Stagecoach also runs a two-hourly service to South Molton, with connecting bus services to Barnstaple.

Other than Stagecoach, First Buses of Somerset operates a two-hourly service to Taunton and Dartline operates a two-hourly service to Dulverton.

== Sport ==
The town has a main football club, Tiverton Town, and many amateur clubs, including Elmore F.C. and Amory Green Rovers. The town also has a rugby club and several cricket clubs. Tiverton White Eagles is a local women's hockey club with three teams in various leagues.

== Media ==
The Tiverton and Mid Devon Gazette's former newsroom on Bampton Street

The Tiverton Gazette is a weekly tabloid newspaper for Tiverton and district, published on Tuesdays to coincide with market day. It first appeared as the Tiverton Gazette and East Devon Herald in 1858, when the founder, Robert Were, was only 22 years old; he died just five years later. The newspaper split into three editions in 1872 – the Tiverton Gazette, Crediton Gazette and South Molton Gazette – but recombined in the mid-1890s as the Mid Devon Gazette. It then split into Town and Rural editions, before splitting three ways once more.

Local news and television programmes are provided by BBC South West and ITV West Country. Television signals are received from the Stockland Hill and local relay TV transmitters.

The town is served by the local radio stations BBC Radio Devon, Heart West, Greatest Hits Radio South West, Radio Exe Devon, and TCR Radio, a community-based station.

== Geography ==
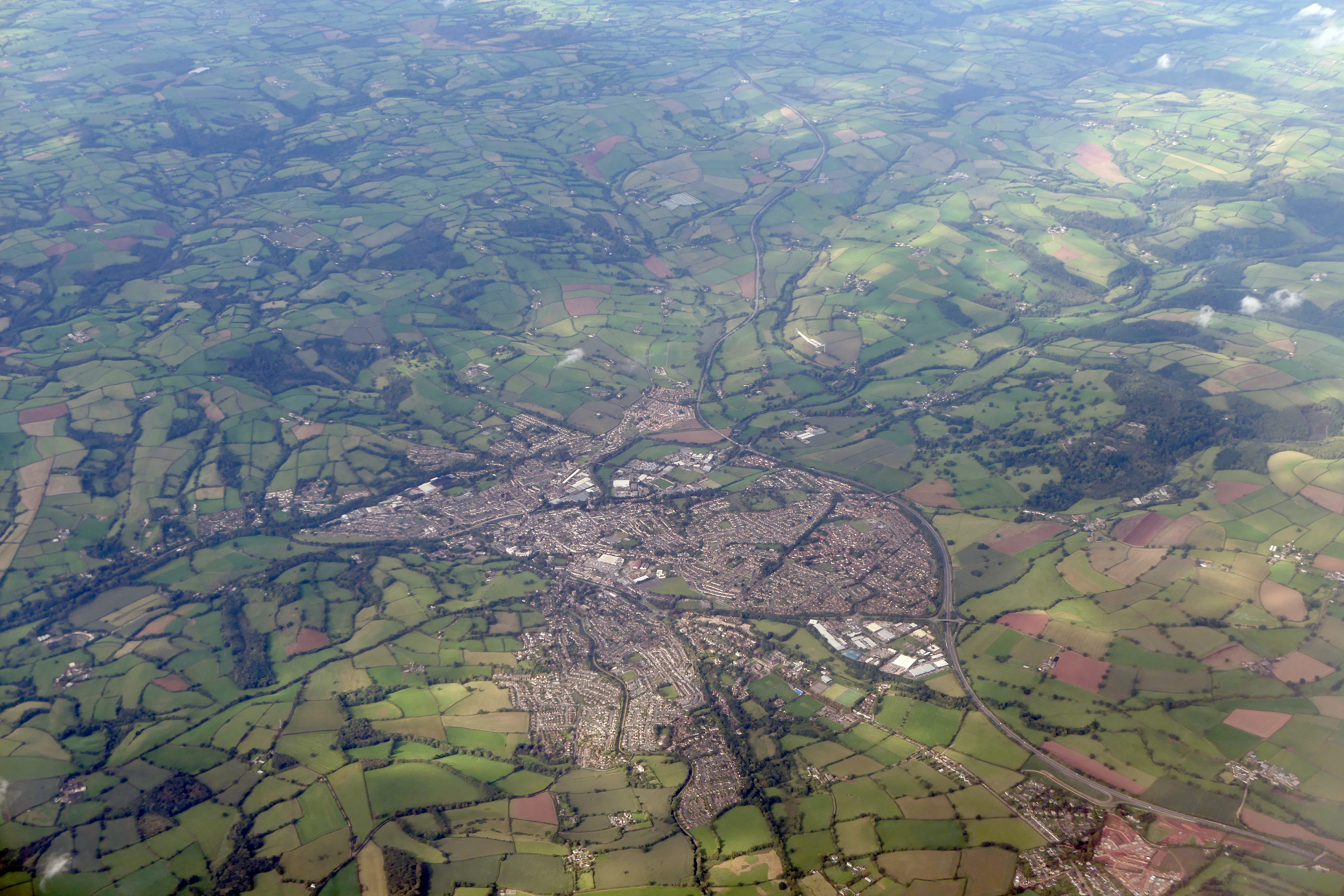
Aerial view of the town and the surrounding countryside

Tiverton lies in north-east Devon 13 miles (21 km) north of Exeter, 46 miles (74 km) north-east of Plymouth and 18 miles (29 km) west of Taunton. The villages of Ashley to the south and Bolham to the north have become suburbs of Tiverton. The River Exe flows through the town.

=== Climate ===
Tiverton has an oceanic climate (Köppen climate classification Cfb).

Climate data for Tiverton
Month	Jan	Feb	Mar	Apr	May	Jun	Jul	Aug	Sep	Oct	Nov	Dec	Year
Mean daily maximum °C (°F)	8 (46)	8 (46)	10 (50)	12 (54)	16 (61)	19 (66)	21 (70)	21 (70)	18 (64)	14 (57)	11 (52)	9 (48)	14 (57)
Mean daily minimum °C (°F)	3 (37)	3 (37)	3 (37)	4 (39)	7 (45)	11 (52)	12 (54)	12 (54)	10 (50)	8 (46)	5 (41)	1 (34)	7 (45)
Source: Weather Channel

== Twin Towns ==
Tiverton is twinned with the German town of Hofheim am Taunus. Tiverton is also twinned with Chinon in France which in turn is also twinned with Hofheim am Taunus. The three towns therefore form twinning triangle.

== Notable people ==
In birth date order:

- Isabella de Redvers, Countess of Devon (1237–1293), countess who bequeathed the Town Leat, was born at Tidcombe.
- John Greenway (c. 1460–1529), a wealthy wool merchant and benefactor of the church
- Catherine of York (1479–1572), During her lifetime, she was daughter of King Edward IV, sister to Edward V, niece to Richard III, sister-in-law to Henry VII and aunt to Henry VIII; died at Tiverton Castle.
- Peter Blundell (1520–1601), merchant clothier whose bequest founded Blundell's School.
- John Waldron (died 1579), a wealthy merchant who founded and endowed the surviving grade II* listed "Waldron's Almshouses" and Chapel on the outskirts of Tiverton.
- George Slee (died 1613), merchant clothier who built The Great House and bequeathed Slee's Almshouses
- Peter Sainthill (1593–1648), Royalist MP for Tiverton 1640-1644
- Richard Newte (1613–1678), Anglican clergyman, son of Henry Newte the elder, Tiverton's first post-Restoration town clerk
- Theophilus Polwhele (died 1689), religious controversialist, once a priest in Tiverton, later first minister of the Steps Meeting House
- Benjamin Incledon (1730–1796), antiquary, trustee of local Chilcott's school and of Blundell's School, whose first history he wrote
- Robert Land (1739–1818), United Empire Loyalist, British spy during the American Revolution, and early settler of Hamilton, Ontario
- James Nixon (c. 1741–1812), noted miniature painter, died in Tiverton.
- Richard Cosway (1742–1821), leading portrait painter of miniatures in the Regency era, was born in Tiverton.
- Hannah Cowley (1743–1809), playwright and poet born in Tiverton
- Martin Dunsford (1744–1807), English merchant and Dissenter, known as an antiquarian and radical politician
- John Rippon (1751–1836), a Baptist minister.
- John Rendle (1758–1815), an English divine.
- Sir Matthew Wood, 1st Baronet (1768–1843), politician, Lord Mayor of London, and MP, 1817-1843.
- John Heathcoat (1783–1861), industrialist who invented the bobbinet lace machine, founder of Heathcoat Fabrics, MP for Tiverton (1832–1859)
- Lord Palmerston (1784–1865), MP for Tiverton (1835–65) and twice prime minister
- John Taylor Coleridge (1790–1876), high court judge and privy councillor, was born in Tiverton.
- James Talbot, 4th Baron Talbot of Malahide (1805–1883), politician and archaeologist.
- William Romaine Govett (1807–1848), surveyor of unexplored country in New South Wales.
- Edward Capern (1819–1894), postman and poet
- John Cross (1819–1861), an English painter.
- William Oxenham (1823–1875), recipient of the Victoria Cross, was born in Tiverton.
- Charles Rossiter Forwood (1827–1890), Attorney General of Fiji from 1872 to 1873, born in Tiverton.
- Sir John Heathcoat-Amory (1829–1914), first of the Heathcoat-Amory baronets
- Richard Blundell Comins (1848–1919), Anglican missionary in the Solomon Islands, was born in Tiverton.
- Frank R. Gooding (1859–1928), seventh Governor of Idaho and US Senator from Idaho
- Thomas Henry Sage (1882–1945), British Army soldier, recipient of the Victoria Cross (VC)
- Alfred Toye (1897–1955), Army Brigadier, awarded the Victoria Cross, lived locally.
- J. D. Salinger (1919–2010), author of The Catcher in the Rye, waited locally for D Day in the spring of 1944.
- Bobby G (born 1953), singer with the Eurovision-winning '80s pop group Bucks Fizz
- Mark Labbett (born 1965), television personality, was born in Tiverton.
- Simon Hall (born 1969), Professor of Chemistry at the University of Bristol, was raised in Tiverton.
- Pete Vuckovic (born 1971), singer/songwriter, was born in Tiverton.

=== Sport ===
- George Burrington (1864–1942), first-class cricketer, was born in Tiverton.
- Francis Bateman-Champain (1877–1942), first-class cricketer, died in Tiverton.
- George Jennings (1895–1959), first-class cricketer, was born in Tiverton.
- Martyn Rogers (born 1955), professional footballer, manager of Tiverton F.C. for 18 years, returning in 2014
- Gareth Townsend (born 1968), first-class cricketer, was born in Tiverton.
- Ryan Searle (born 1987), PDC professional darts player, was born in Tiverton.
- Jay Stansfield (born 2002), football player for Birmingham City, born in Tiverton.

== See also ==
- Grand Western Canal
- Perambulation of the Town Leat
