= Nottingham Industrial Museum =

Industrial museum in Nottingham, England

Coordinates: 52.948110°N 1.212220°W

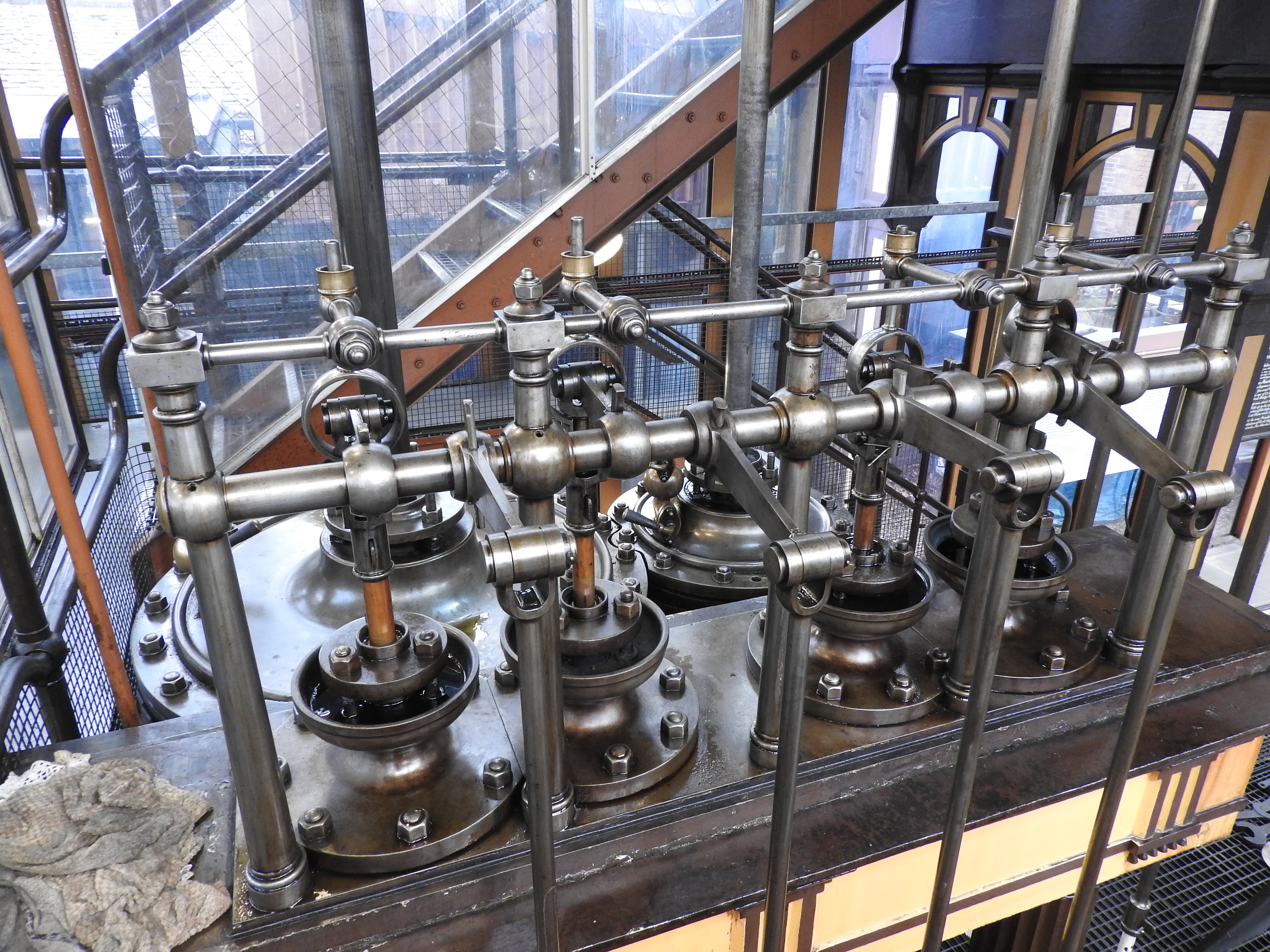
Basford Beam Engine

The Nottingham Industrial Museum is a volunteer-run museum situated in part of the 17th-century stables block of Wollaton Hall, located in a suburb of the city of Nottingham. The museum won the Nottinghamshire Heritage Site of the Year Award 2012, a local accolade issued by Experience Nottinghamshire. The Museum collection closed in 2009 after Nottingham City Council withdrew funding, but has since reopened at weekends and bank holidays, helped by a £91,000 government grant, and run by volunteers. (Note: Registered Charity Number: 1167388 Limited Company by Guarantee: 09679802)

The museum contains a display of local textiles machinery, transport, telecommunications, mining and engineering technology. There is a display of cycles, motorcycles, and motor cars. There are examples of significant lace-making machinery. It also houses an operational beam engine, from the Basford, Nottingham pumping station.

== Context ==
Nottingham, Tiggua Cobaucc ─ Place of Caves, Snotengaham ─ "the homestead of Snot's people" was settled by the Vikings in 867 and by the Normans in 1086. They had established a castle there in 1067, which was fortified in stone 1120. Within the county, the cloth was manufactured and dyed, and coal was taken from outcrops near the Derbyshire border. Alabaster was also an important mineral. The city became the most important centre in the East Midlands, being fought over in all the internecine royal squabbles from the Battle of Bosworth until the English Civil War. The castle fell into disuse and was dismantled in 1651. With the castle came all the supporting industries and commerce associated with a city.

== Collections ==
The museum divides the displays relating to five areas: Textiles, Transport, Communications, Mining and Steam.

=== Textiles ===
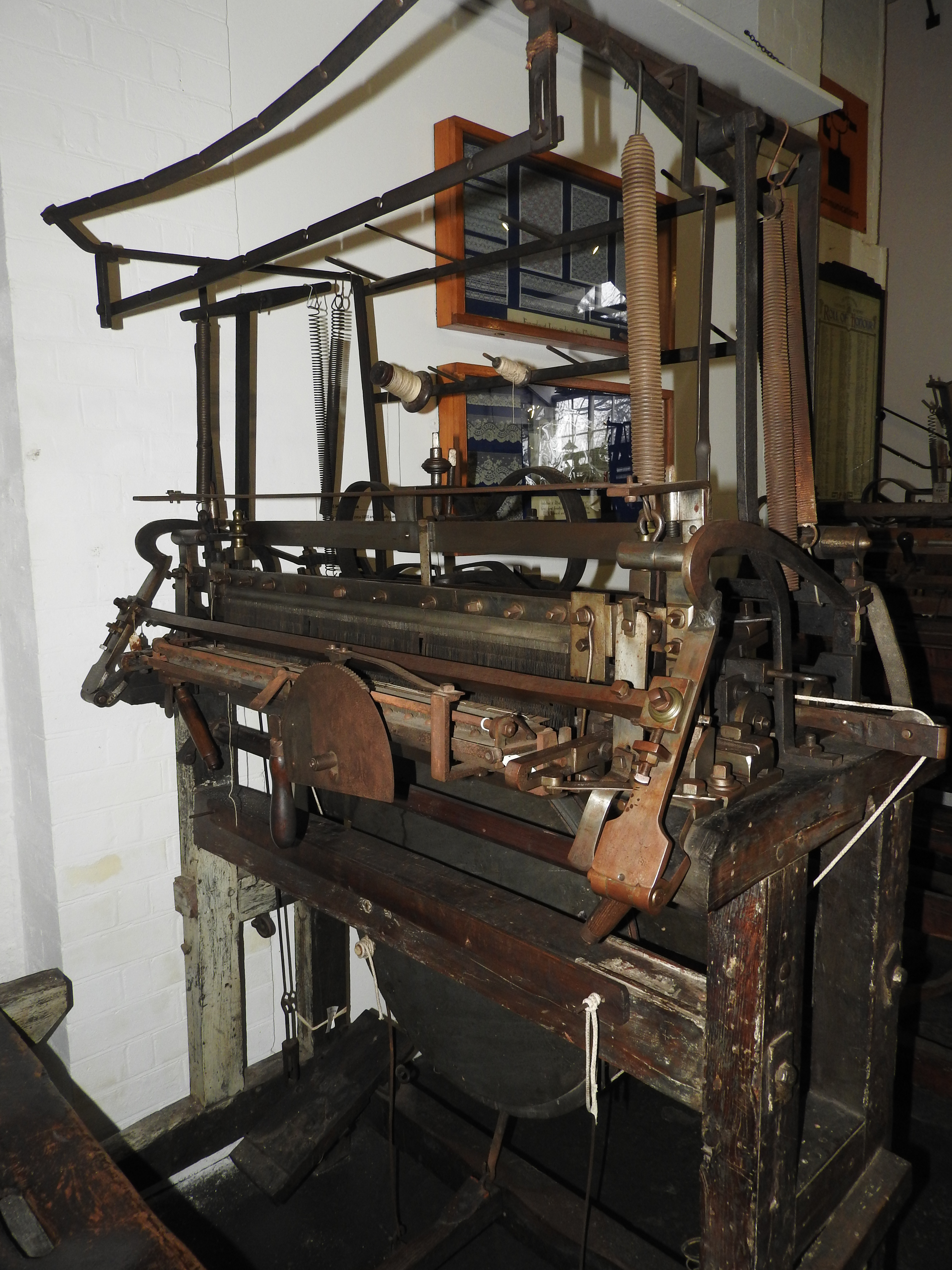
A stocking frame

Two key inventions originating from Nottinghamshire gave rise to the local textile industry:

- In 1589, William Lee (inventor) of Calverton (just north of Nottingham), developed a framework knitting machine that enabled the manufacture of large volumes of stocking hoses at speeds far in excess of those achievable by hand knitting. By the 1760s there were some 20,000 of these machines installed in cottages dotted around the East Midlands and centred on Nottingham. This represented approximately 90% of the total number of such machines in the UK. The Nottingham Industrial Museum has a number of examples of these machines. One of the museum's framework knitting machines incorporates a Lace Bar Attachment. This attachment, invented in Nottingham in about 1760, enables a form of knitted lace to be made on a framework knitting machine.
- In 1808 John Heathcoat developed a hand-operated lace-making machine, able to make lace in the same manner as lace is made by hand. This marked the beginning of the Nottingham lace industry. In 1812, the Luddites broke into Heathcoat's Loughborough factory and smashed many of his machines. Rather than accept government compensation for the damage to his factory, Heathcoat elected to move his operations to Tiverton in Devon. Following the expiry of Heathcoat's patent in 1825, there was a rapid expansion in machine lace-making in the Nottingham area. The firm of John Leavers soon became major manufacturers of such machines. These machines were installed in Nottingham's lace factories and driven by overhead line shafts powered by stationary steam engines located in the factory engine houses. At its peak, the Nottingham Lace Industry used over 1,000 such machines and was the centre the World's machine-made lace industry. Some 30,000 people were employed in that industry in the Nottingham area.

The galleries at Nottingham Industrial Museum feature stocking frames, a 1910 warp knitting machine, a Wilman Circular, an Old Loughborough Bobbinet, a 1910 Heathcoat, a Leavers machine (Note: Invented by John Levers, the 'a' was added to aid pronunciation. Donated by Cluny Lace of Ilkeston) and a Barmen lace machine. In 2018, the Leavers lace machine was returned to operational condition.

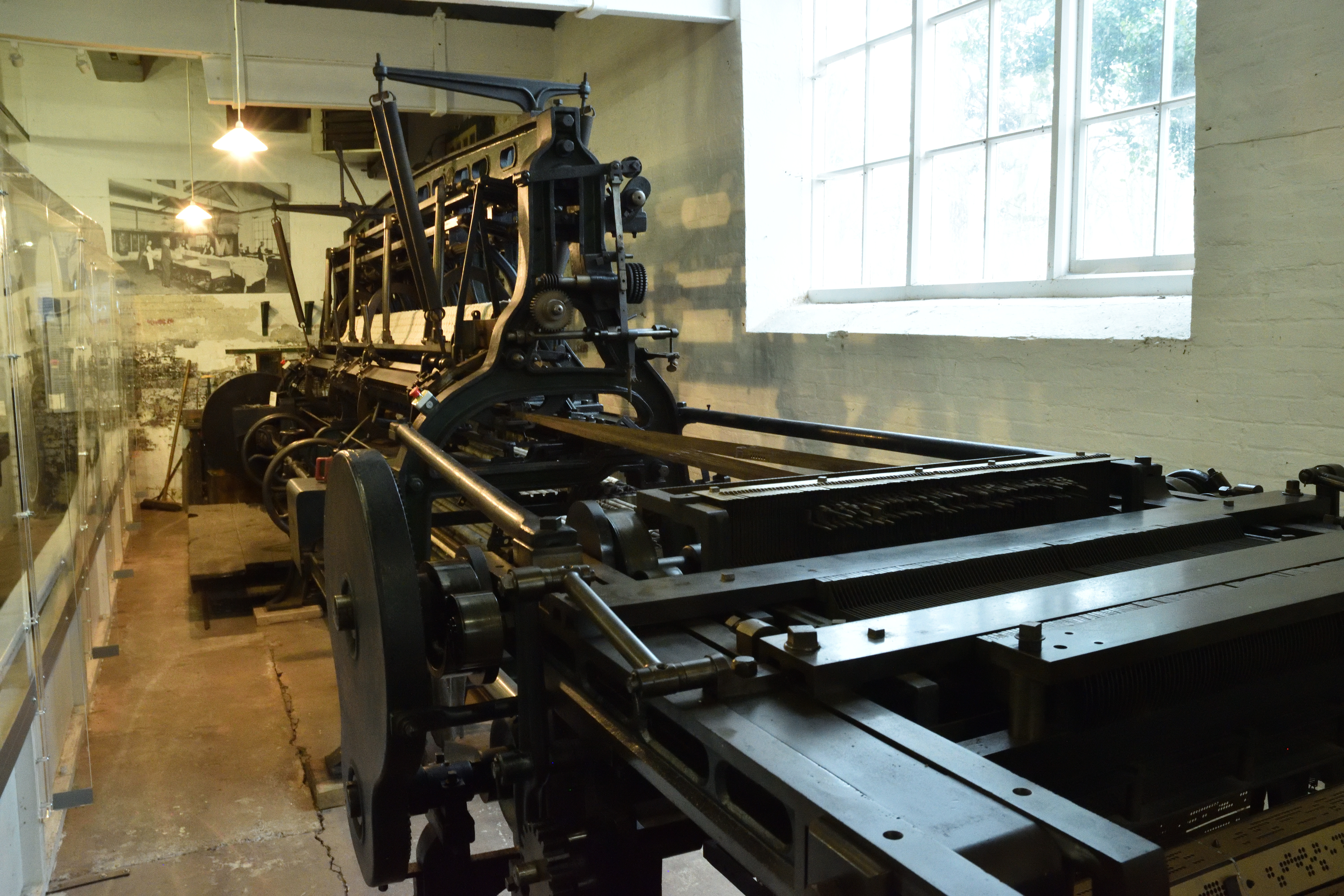
The Nottingham Industrial Museum's Advanced Leavers Lace Machine (built 1881)

=== Transport ===
There is a small collection of restored Raleigh bicycles and Brough Superior motorbikes. Three thousand Brough Superior motorbikes were made in George Brough's factory on Haydn Road. TE Lawrence was an enthusiast and was killed riding one of the eight he owned. The galleries display two 17th-century Baskerville coaches of dubious origin, Thomas Humber's own bicycle, a Brough Superior car, and a unique Celer car.

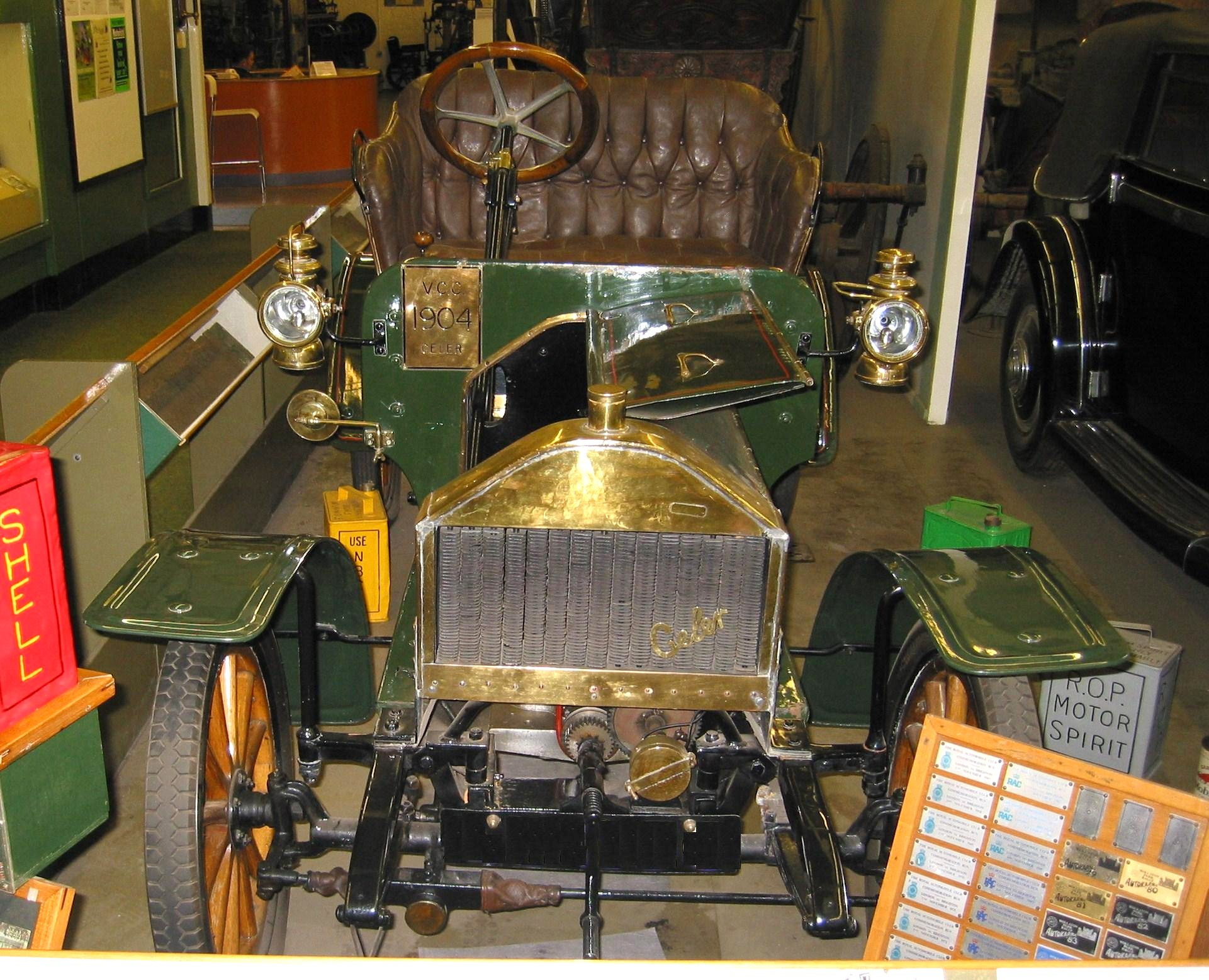
Celer automobile

=== Communication ===
Exhibits show how Nottingham changed the communications industry, and how the communications industry changed the daily lives of Nottingham people. Visitors can see and hear restored vintage radios and gramophones dating back to the 1920s, and tap their own Morse code message on a telegraph system.

=== Mining and agriculture ===
In the yard is a coal truck from Clifton Colliery from the days when this mine was providing most of the coal for the nearby Wilford Power Station which was situated on the site of what is now the Riverside Retail Park. Nearby is situated a restored living van. These were towed behind steam engines and steam rollers and provided accommodation for labourers whilst working on farms or road works. There are usually a number of tractors to be found in the tractor yard and these can sometimes be seen working during steaming days. The tractor collection comprises a Standard Fordson and a Field Marshall Series 2.

Outside the engine-house is a yard which is home to a number of barn engines, used previously to drive items like pumps and agricultural machinery. There are examples from manufacturers such as Wolseley. The barn engines are usually seen operating at steaming days.

=== Engines ===
The Steam Gallery contains a Basford Beam Engine, one of a pair of engines built in 1858 by R. W. Hawthorn in Newcastle upon Tyne. It was installed at Basford Pumping Station to lift water 110 ft from the sandstone below to supply fresh water to the City of Nottingham. The engine was replaced in 1965 and was removed to the purpose-built Steam Gallery where it was first fired in 1975. Also in this building today are a variety of pumps and engines, many of which were removed from local companies; for example E. Reader & Sons of Phoenix Engine Works, Cremorne Street, Nottingham (Makers of high-speed stationary steam engines).

At one end of the gallery stand two ploughing engines. These have consecutive registration numbers and were the last two production engines to come out of Fowlers Leeds Foundry. Owned by Nottingham City Council, they were used for ploughing the treated sewage into the land at a large dairy farm at Stoke Bardolph. One of these engines is operational and is used at the steam up events. Next to the ploughing engines is a J. T. Marshall Portable steam engine, built at the Nottingham Engineering Works, Sandiacre, in 1886. It has been restored to full working order and can be seen operating at the steam up events.

=== Other exhibits ===
An operational model railway can also be seen in the steam hall along with a working model of a Robey stationary engine. In a separate room, there is a very large stationary mill engine that was previously housed in a Nottinghamshire pub before being rescued by the museum. Behind the mill engine lies a 00 gauge railway display. Alongside the communications exhibits are clocks and printing machines. There are also items from prominent local companies such as Boots the Chemist, Players Cigarettes and Stanton Ironworks. In one of the museum's yards is a carved stone crest from Nottingham's first railway station, opened by the Midland Counties Railway in 1839.
