= Liturgical lace =

Textile ornamentation used in the Christian tradition

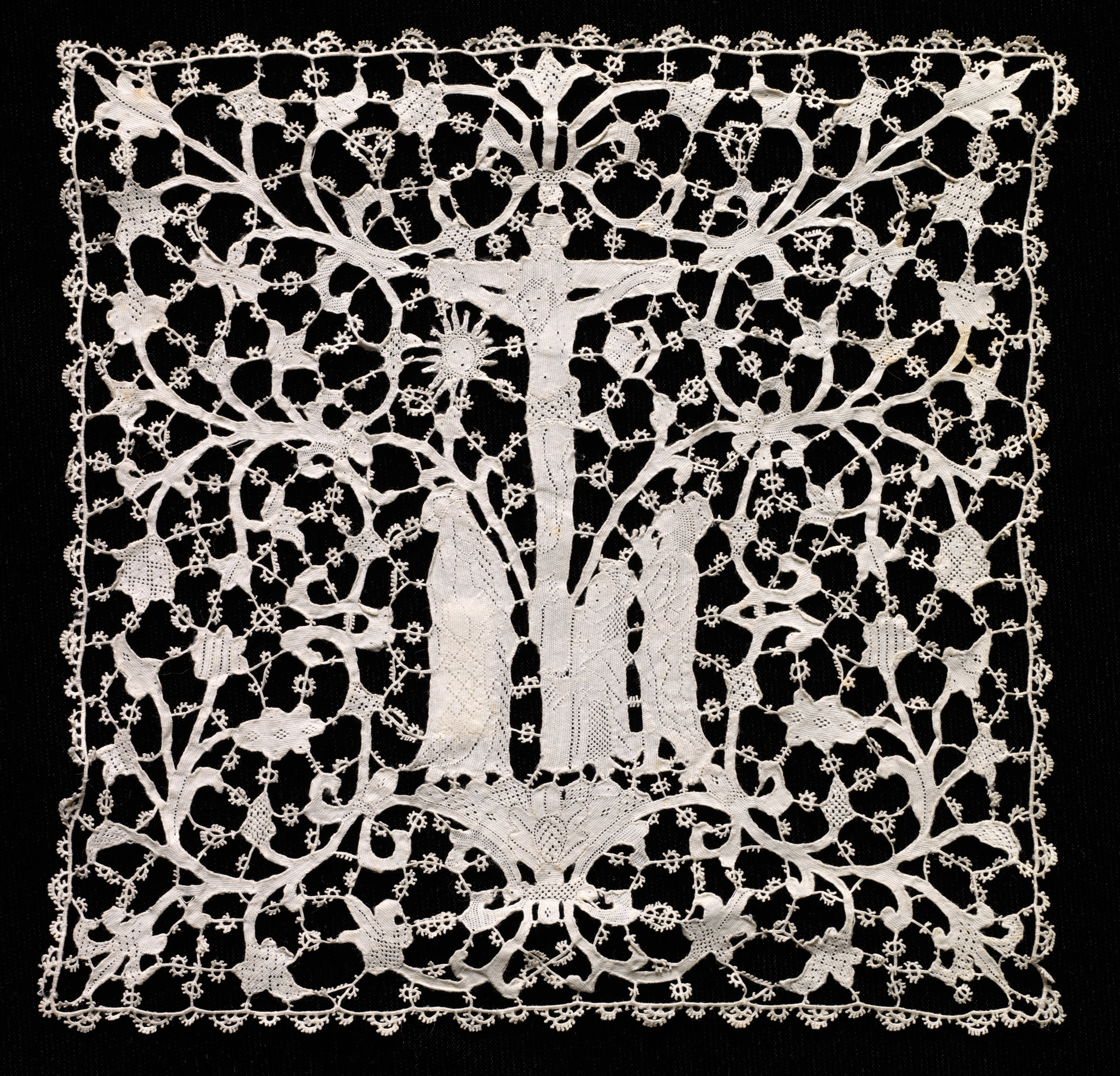
Italy, Venice, 17th century – Needlepoint (Venetian Flat Point) Lace Ecclesiastical Square – 1923.1026 – Cleveland Museum of Art

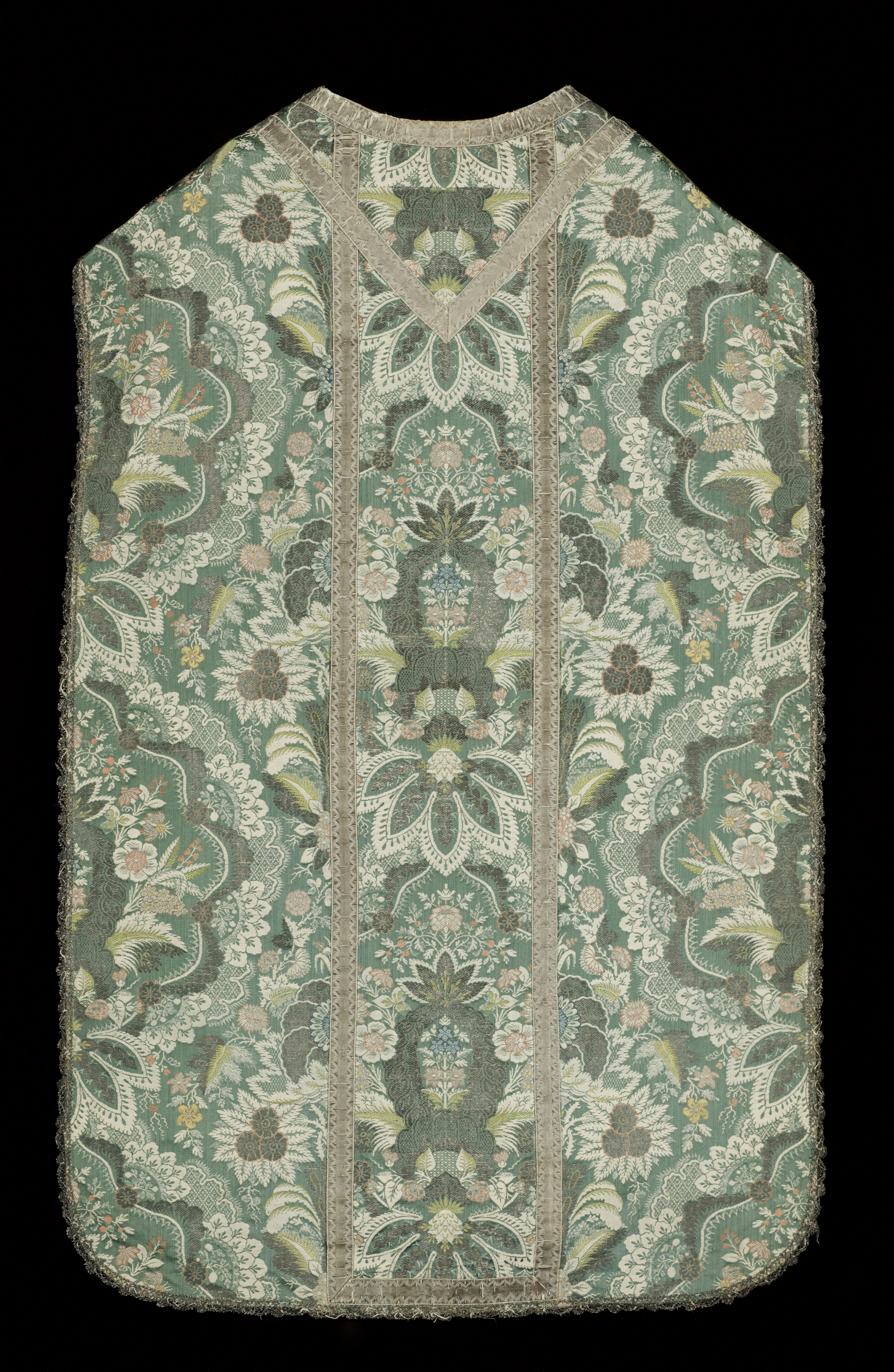
France, Louis 14th style, 18th century – Chasuble – 1916.1438 – Cleveland Museum of Art

Liturgical lace refers to the use of lace as a form of liturgical ornamentation at the crossroads of religious art and decorative arts.

== History ==
=== The Egyptian origin of liturgical lace ===
Though it is often believed that "no documentary evidence exists that lace was made before the 15th century", it has also been shown from ancient Egyptian nets that embroidered patterns from Antiquity could be found. The first trace of the use of lace in a liturgical context was found in the Egyptian sarcophagus. Bead-net dresses, mentioned in Egyptian literature since the Three Tales of Wonder (known also as the Tales from the Westcar Papyrus ) and depicted in Egyptian art as the costume sky goddess, Nut, from the third millennium BC, can be seen as the oldest form or liturgical lace. In fact, given that these dresses were too heavy to move in, and having been found solely within tombs, it seems like they primarily served a funerary and liturgical function. They were made by stringing beads together on a net which was then worn over a linen dress. This early design known as a square knotted mesh netting was, therefore, a geometric design similar to sprang.

=== The apostolic symbolism: from fishing nets to filet lace ===
Based on Ephesians 5 and the visions of the supper of the lamb in the book of Revelation, liturgical lace has been described as a way for the Church to symbolize itself as a virginal bride celebrating the divine marriage with the heavenly spouse. Liturgical lace has also been compared to the fishing nets of the apostles, especially as the Venetian lace is said to have originated from the Venetian sailors' art of knitting nets.

=== From Eastern monasticism to Franciscan lace ===
Liturgical lace may have been disseminated in the Catholic Church through the migration of monks from the East such as Nilus the Younger. Lace may have also evolved alongside realistic ornamentation from the gammalion and cross-shape lace to more figurative representations such as flowing scrolls and vine leaves, as found in manuscript ornamentation as monasticism developed both male and female convents under the lead of Benedict of Nursia and Scholastica.

This pairing of male and female liturgical lace has its earliest representation with the linen alb of Francis of Assisi presumably made by Clare of Assisi.

By the early 13th century, the Ancrene Wisse, an anonymous monastic rule for female anchoresses cautions nuns against devoting too much time to lace and ornamental work, to the detriment of work for the poor.

=== The Venetian renaissance of liturgical lace under the protection of Saint Francis Regis ===
Lace industries, which sprang up like mushrooms all over Europe during the sixteenth century, encouraged the addition of lace to embellish the Catholic liturgy.

By the 1660s, Venetian needle lace became the most fashionable lace, with the patronage of the Catholic Church. Its characteristics with the exaggeration of three-dimensional qualities of needle lace; creating patterns which could be divided into parts allowed for the production of large-scale ecclesiastical items like vestments and church furnishings that were "conspicuously extravagant."

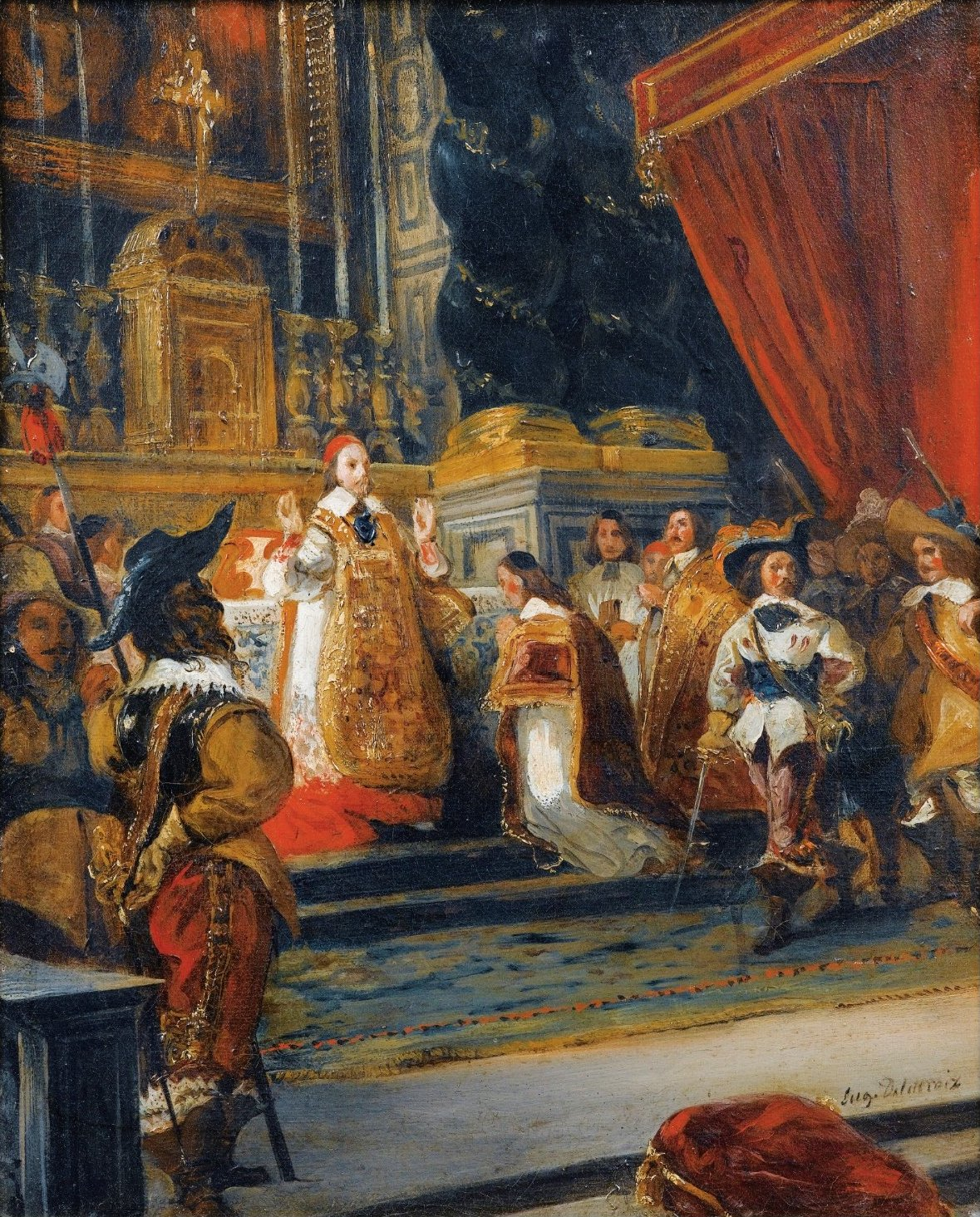
Cardinal Richelieu saying Mass in the Church of the Palais Royal is painted by Delacroix wearing a delicate liturgical lace.

However, the major revolution to liturgical lace was sparked off by the invention of leaver lace which originated in Nottingham in England, early in the nineteenth century. Lace machines faced the opposition of the Luddites who had to be stopped in their vandalism by the Destruction of Stocking Frames, etc. Act 1812. Eventually, the machines made lace much more accessible and in the 1840s, lace prices fell dramatically, which meant that albs, rochets and surplices could be garnished with very high lace of 60 cm. or more.

Through centuries, liturgical lace developed a style of its own across various cultures and even helped grow the industry, as in places such as Poland where bobbin laces were created for liturgical vestments and workshops bloomed across the country.

=== Liturgical lace under fire since the Church Discipline Act 1840 ===
In England, after the Church Discipline Act 1840 (3 & 4 Vict. c. 86) which aimed to counter the rise of ritualism in the Anglican Church, Robert Liddell, then vicar of Saint Paul's Church in Knightsbridge, was taken to court by his churchwarden for the use of cloths edged with lace as well as altar crosses and credence tables. In 1854, while the courts refused him the use of an altar cross and of a credence table, lace was tolerated.

By the mid-19th century in France, lace was considered something of the 18th century and was replaced by more affordable filet lace or tulle which originated in Tulle, a city in the southern central region of France which was criticized as liturgical vestments were meant to be in linen and not in cotton which was used to make the latter.

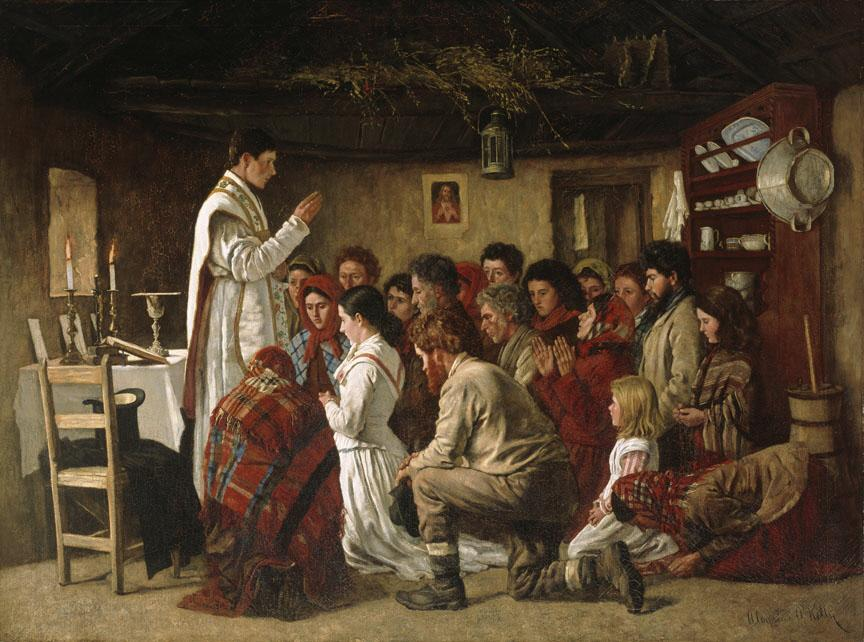
Lace alb worn by the priest during the Mass in a Connemara Cabin painted by Aloysius O'Kelly, in 1883

Meanwhile, lace flourished in Ireland.

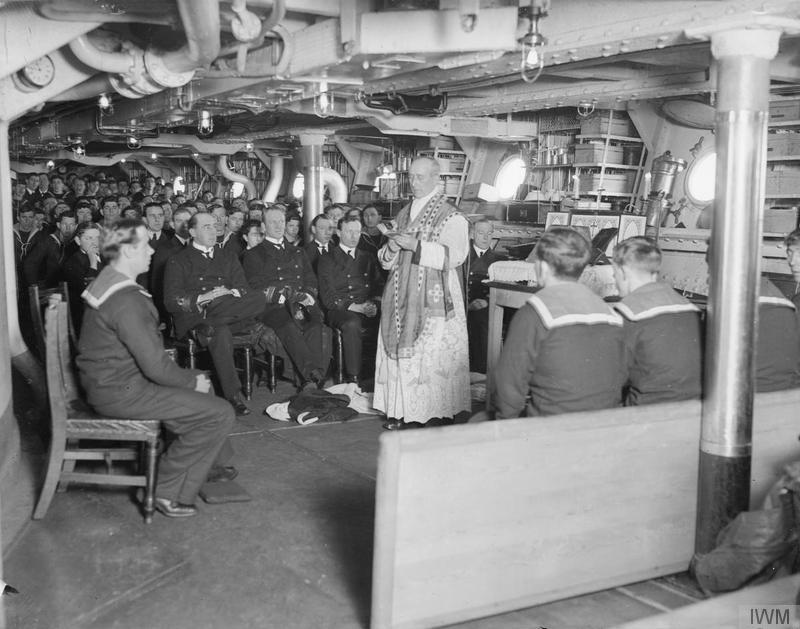
A Roman Catholic priest with a full-length lace alb holding Mass on one of the mess decks in HMS Royal Oak during the First World War

Yet, the trend for more elaborate liturgical lace concerned some in the Catholic Church as well, already in 1880, Pio Martinucci as secretary of the Sacred Congregation for the Discipline of the Sacraments or Ceremonials, noted that the surplice has become merely an ornament whose excess elegance little becomes its sacred usage.

Superpelliceum, cuius forma nunc multiplex atque ad merum ornamentum redactum est, cavendum ne tum forma tum etiam nimia elegantia indecens sit.

— Pio Martinucci, Manuale sacrarum caeremoniarum, 1880

In 1912, the Benedictine monk Lambert Beaudoin recommended the use of lace and advised that the best liturgical lace was the one that was sown directly on the liturgical vestment.

From the 1930s onwards, the Liturgical movement was particularly critical of the use of liturgical lace. Women involved in embroidery and sowing at the time criticized liturgical lace as "worldly", "effeminate", and "feminine", arguing it had "no rightful place in the embroidering of liturgical vestments".

In the 1950s, as the trend was to give "imitate the nature of things, truth and substance", the tendency was to reject the transparency of lace as frivolous. The price of lace compared to linen was also used as an economic argument against its use in liturgy.

The price of lace is such as nearly always to react unfavourably on the church linen, that is to say, if we dispensed with lace we might have linen of a better quality, we might have more of it, and we might be able to change it more often.

— Eugéne Roulin, Vestments and Vesture, a Manual of Liturgical Art, 1950

The whole movement was not against lace, as others encouraged its use in order for women to veil themselves when in church, in an attempt to return to the earliest centuries of Christian liturgy.

At the Second Vatican Council, liturgical lace was still very much in use.

=== Between renewal and criticism ===
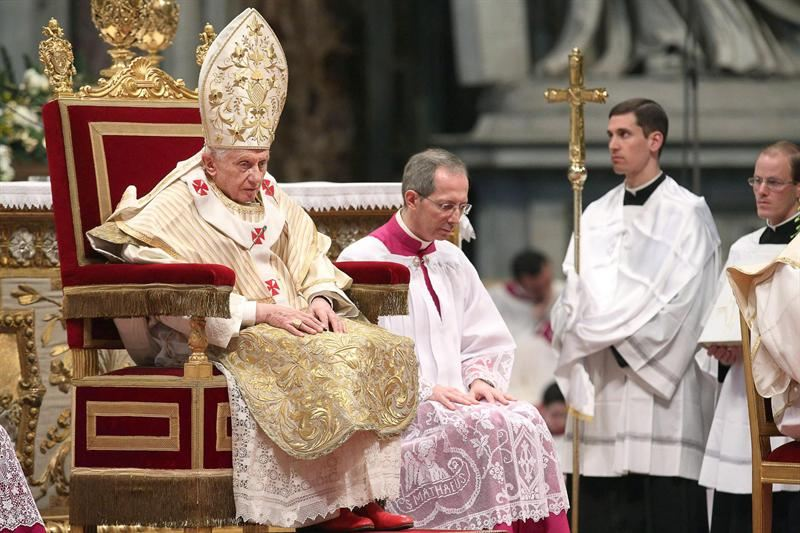
Pope Benedict XVI in 2013 wearing intricate liturgical lace under the papal fanon

While the Second Vatican Council encouraged the beauty of the celebration, contradictory esthetic standards have led to conflicting positions on the use of lace in liturgy. In the United States alone for example, in 1996, altar lace was recommended as a way to lead toward prayers, especially for catechumenate team formation. At the same time, other official documents suggests that the use of altar lace and "old frontals" should be rejected preferring "a simple white cloth without lots of lace or frill".

In the wake of the pedophilia crisis, some went as far as to accuse liturgical lace of feminizing the celibate priesthood by "appropriating a female persona" and enacting "homoerotic aspects". Bordering homophobic slur, some critics referring to a "homosexual question" in the Catholic Church have stated that "the exaggerated taste for lace has ceased to make us smile".

Since the 1990s however, younger generations have been keen on restoring the use of liturgical lace despite being considered as "retro" backwardism by those who presumed it was a return to the past. Under the pontificate of Pope Benedict XVI, the use of liturgical lace made a major comeback. However, Pope Francis has expressed a rather mitigated opinion saying ironically that liturgical lace or merletti described by La Croix journalist as "retrograde accouterments" were merely a "tribute to grandmothers" and needed some aggiornamento sixty years after the Council.

== Use: albs, surplices, rochets, mantillas, lace cuffs and framed prayers ==
Liturgical lace has been used especially for liturgical vestments suchs as albs, surplices, and rochets or gremiale.

Lace is also often added to liturgical tablecloths and pieces such as chalice covers. Altar lace which consists of lace fringe which is usually attached to the front of the altar, was never mentioned in the rubrics, but it become popular in both Catholic and Reformed churches. Thus, even in Lutheran churches of Denmark, altars of most churches used to have "richly embroidered altar frontals, usually in crimson velvet, and with a deep superfrontal of lace". However, the corporal was never decorated with liturgical lace in order to avoid fragments of the consecrated host from being trapped in their stitching.

Liturgical lace was also used for mantillas, liturgical veil worn by women popular in Spain as well as in Latin America.

Papal nobility would also wear facciole or lace collar, consisting of two separate rectangular strips of lace or muslin, lace cuffs, steel buttons and buckles.

Finally, lace filet is sometimes used to frame Christian prayers such as the Our Father.

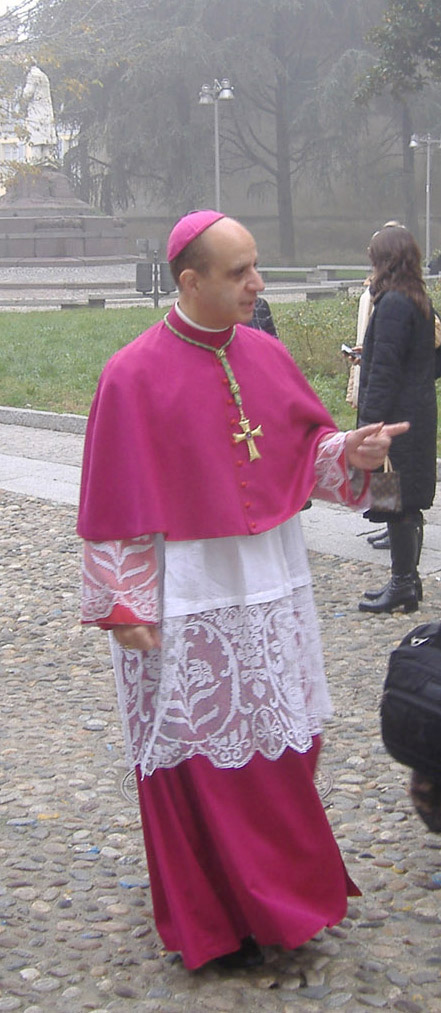
Rino Fisichella wearing a rochet with lace

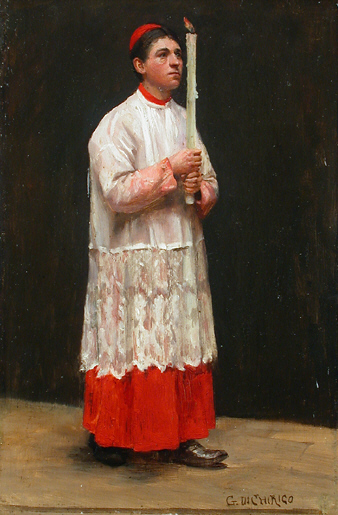
A young altar boy wearing a surplice with lace, in a painting by Giacomo di Chirico

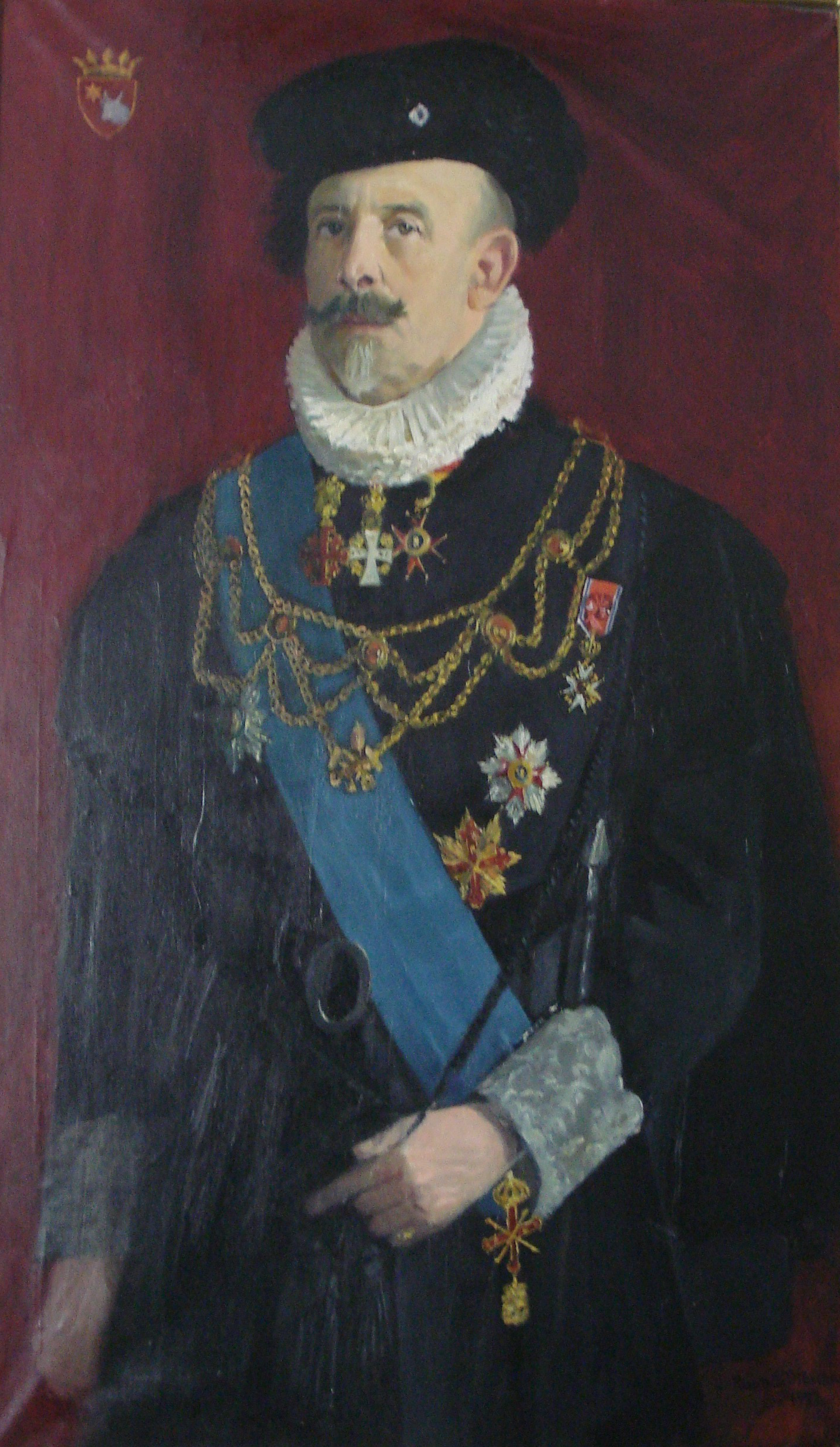
Christopher de Paus (1862–1943), in the court dress of a papal chamberlain with lace cuffs

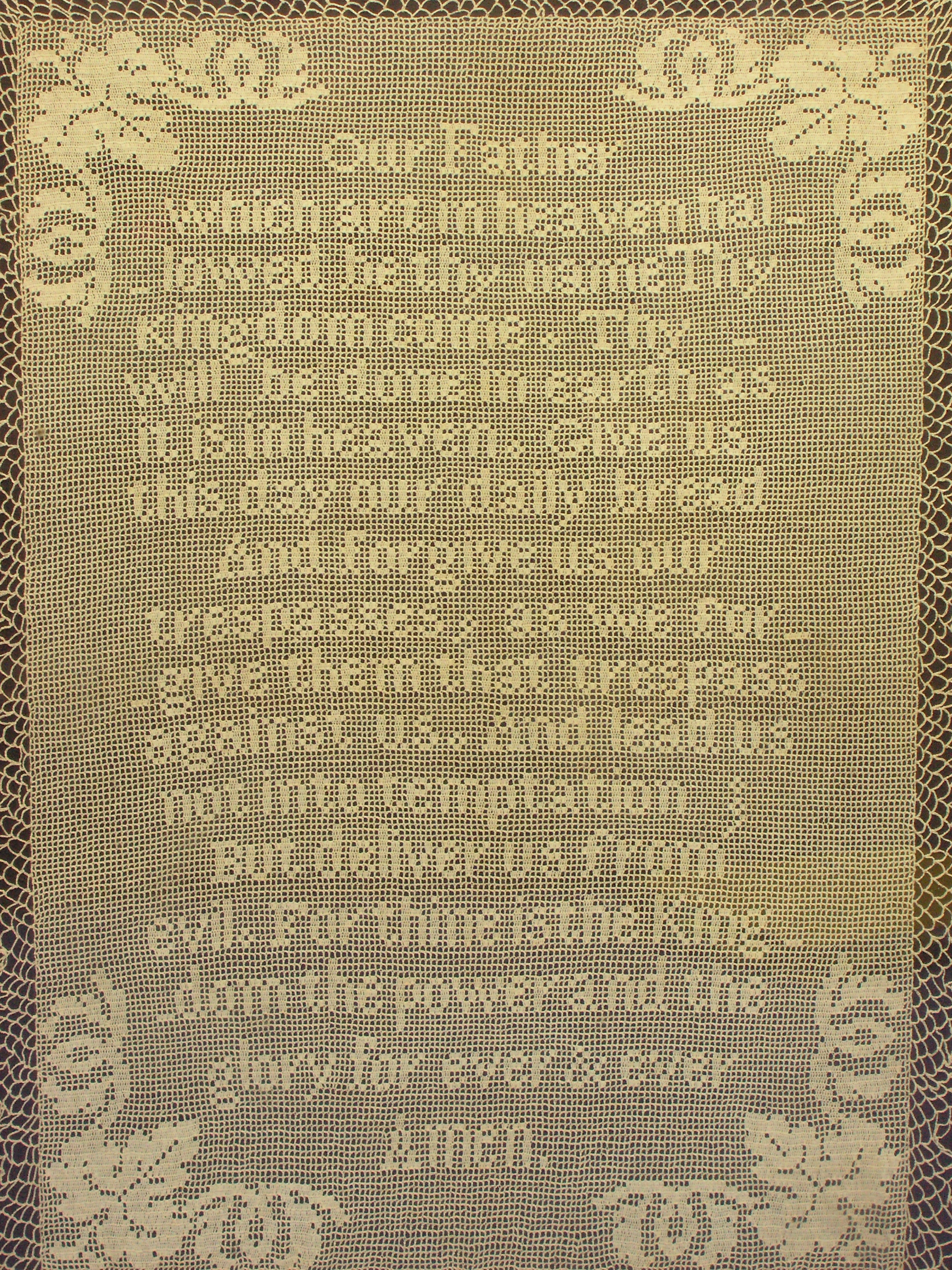
The Lord's Prayer from the Protestant liturgy on a lace filet

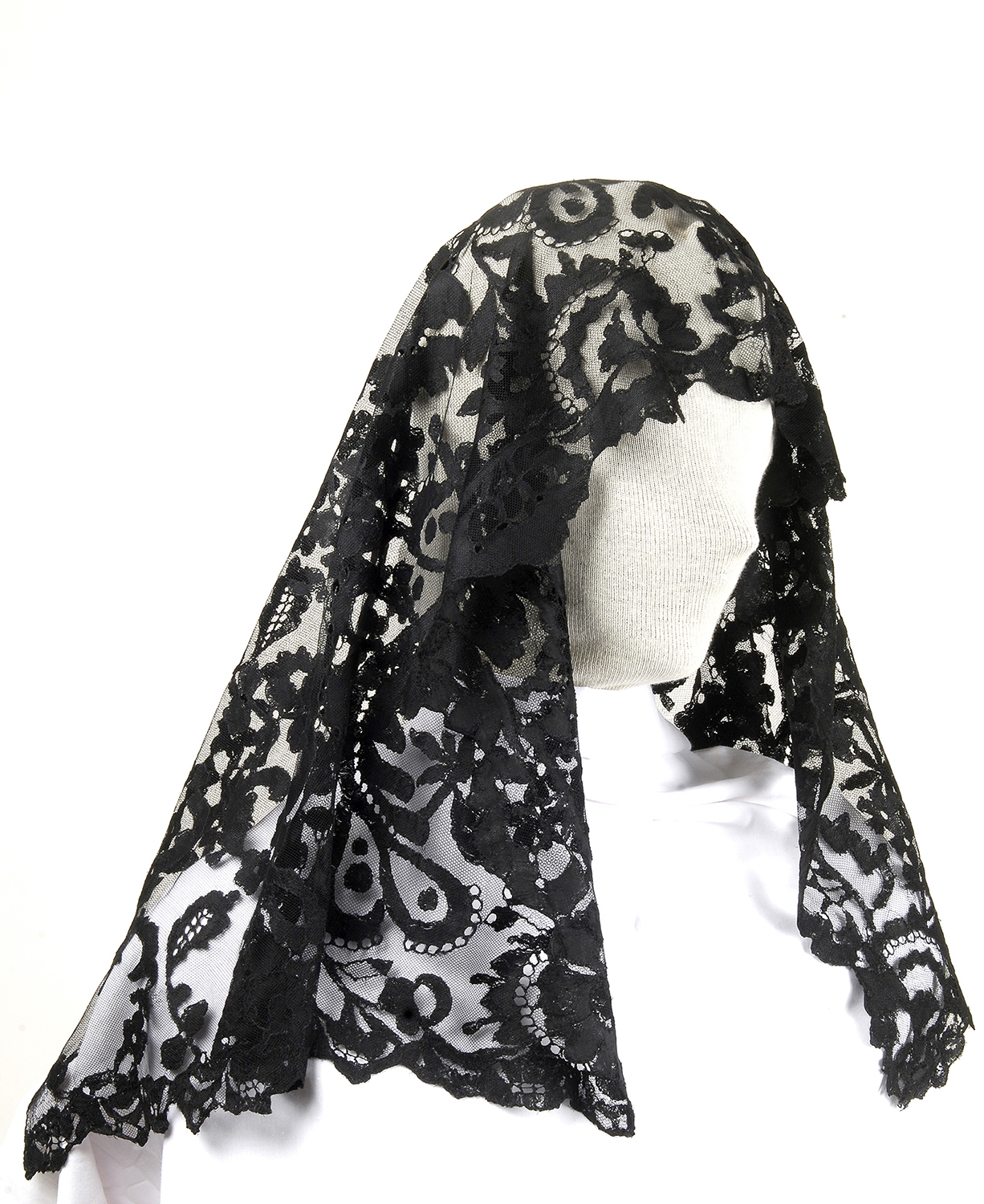
Spanish mantilla made entirely of lace are often worn in church by devout women

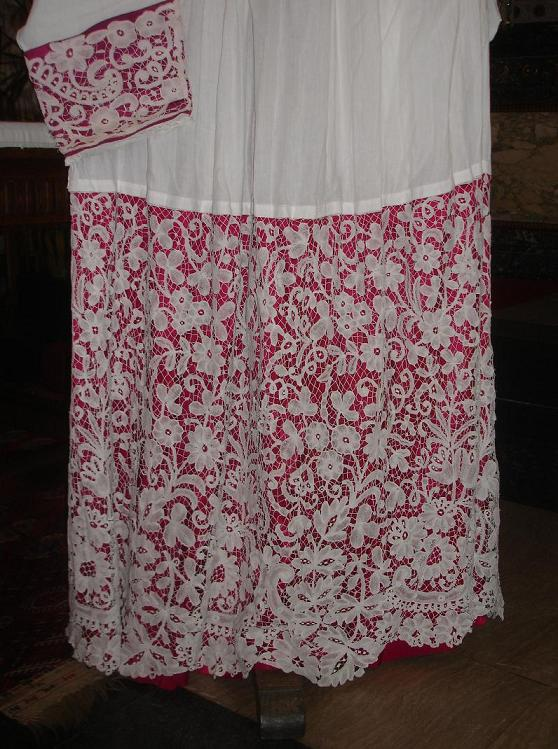
Alb of Vangheluwe

== Styles ==
Liturgical lace uses two main styles of lace: the needlepoint and the bobbin-point lace, which evolved in different geographical contexts but serve similar liturgical settings.

While styles of liturgical lace have evolved through centuries, the most popular trimmings today are considered to be:

- Nottingham Lace, which was invented in 1846 through the use of lace machines
- Leavers Lace, which uses similar machines but comes closest to resembling handmade lace
- French Re-embroidered Lace, which is hybrid, using lace machines and adding floral motifs in the lace that have been traced in embroidery, enhancing the beauty of the design and lending the lace more weight and structure
- Cantù Lace, which is a handmade bobbin lace dating back to at least the 15th century, consists of winding vines flowing through each piece of lace on which are added inserts or ‘cartouches’ made of needle lace.

== Culture ==
The symbolist Flemish poet Georges Rodenbach fantasized about the liturgical lace of the Beguines which he referred to as the "lace of temptation" ("la dentelle de la Tentation").

In the Italian city of Rapallo, there is a museum dedicated to liturgical lace and lace in general. Moreover, Catholic churches often consider liturgical lace in their sacristies as part of their treasure.

== Bibliography ==
- Downham, Marie-Clare (1989). Lace for Church Use. Batsford. ISBN 978-0-7134-5836-7.
