= Nottingham lace curtain machine =

Lace-making machine invented in 1846

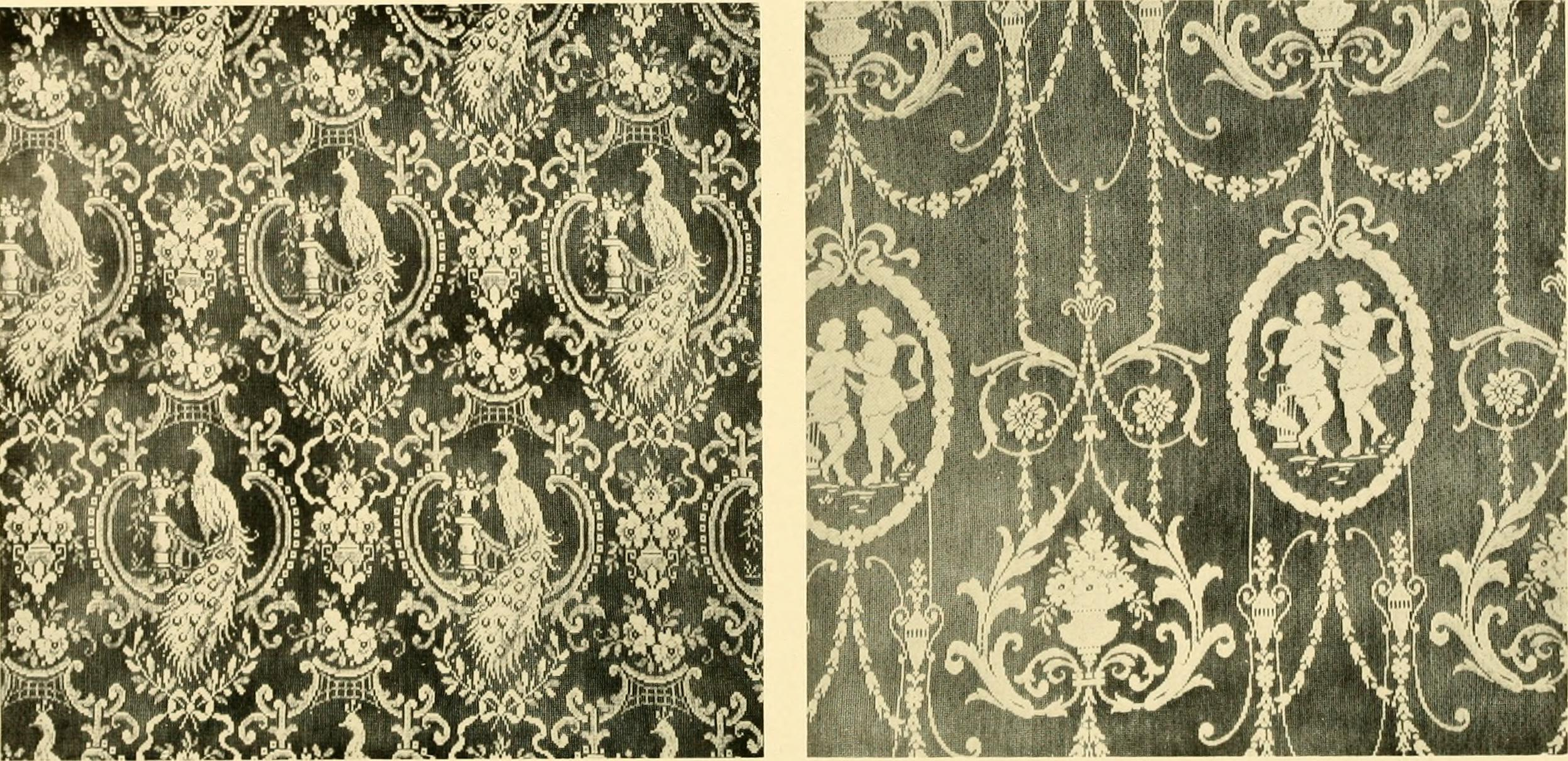
Machine lace curtains 1918

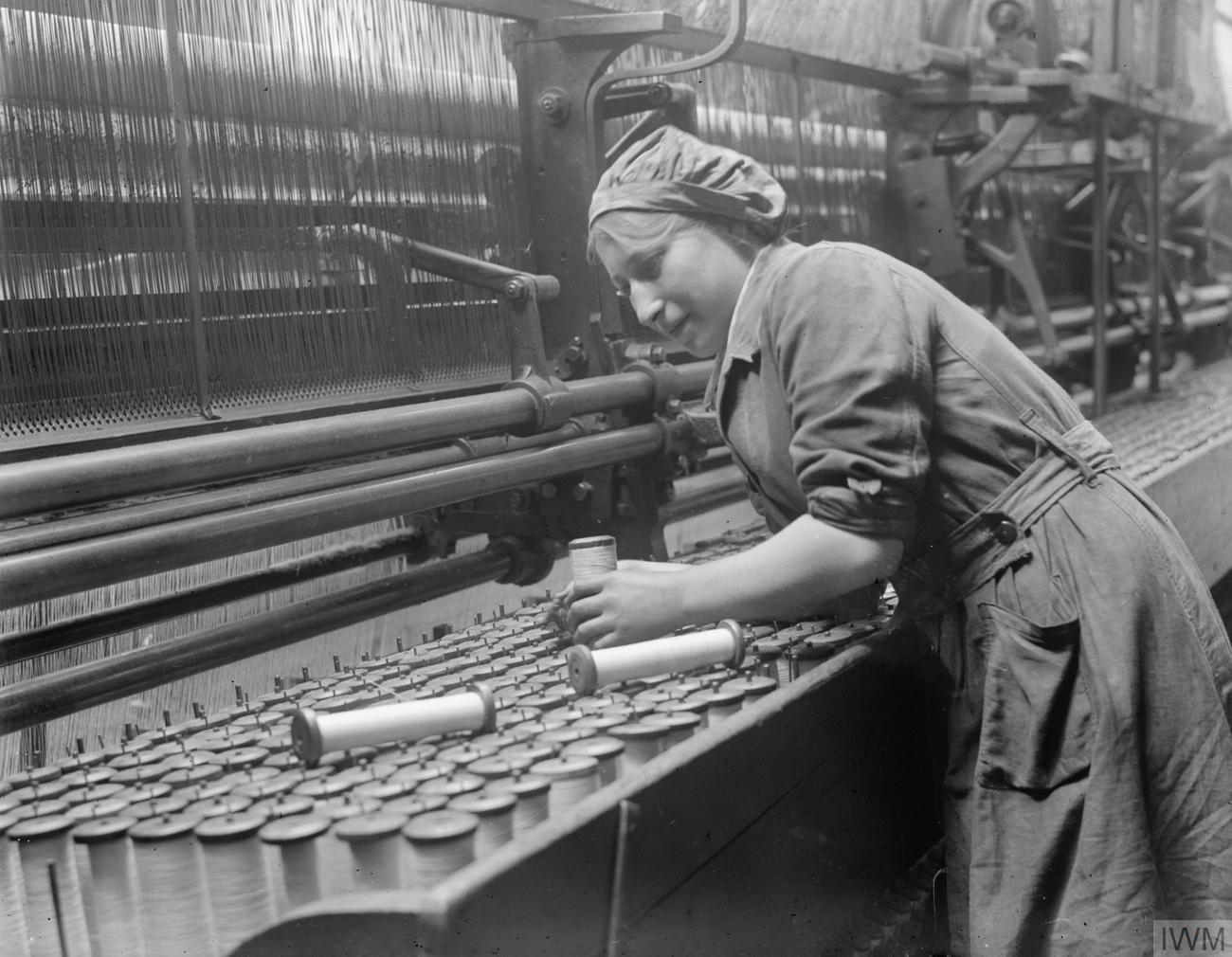
Spooling on a Nottingham lace curtain machine 1918

The lace curtain machine is a lace machine invented by John Livesey in Nottingham in 1846. It was an adaptation of John Heathcoat's bobbinet machine. It made the miles of curtaining which screened Victorian and later windows. Popular among a range of social groups, different sizes and styles were marketed to various consumers.

== History ==
The forerunner of the mechanical lace-making machine was the 1589 stocking frame. This is a weaving frame fitted with a bar of bearded needles that passed back and forth, to and from the operator. There was no warp. The beards were simultaneously depressed by a presser bar catching the weft and holding it back for a course, making a row of loops. After Jeremiah Strutt had modified the machine in 1759 to make it capable of ribbing, in 1764 Hammond introduced a tickler stick to transfer the loops 2 or 3 gaits sideways. In this way, mechanical lace-making was born. But there was no carriage or comb, and the operations continued to be performed sequentially by the operator.

Invented by John Livesey in Nottingham in 1846, the lace curtain machine was initially seen as a form of a Leavers machine - a modification of the Circular. The Leavers mesh tends to be hexagonal, while the Curtain machine produces a straight mesh. The use of Jacquards for producing patterned lace was well established. At the 1851 Great Exhibition, curtains 5 yards (460 cm) long by 2 yards (180 cm) wide were displayed. Their extensive designs required over 12,000 Jacquard cards. The curtain lace industry prospered with the advent of the fashion for large rising sash windows.

The width of the frame ultimately increased to 420 inches (11 m), and in 1928 a machine of 300 inches (7.6 m) was considered to be the smallest viable size. Its supremacy was challenged in 1900 by the popularity of Schiffli embroideries produced on the bobbinet, then in the 1950s by the Raschel and the use of artificial fibres.

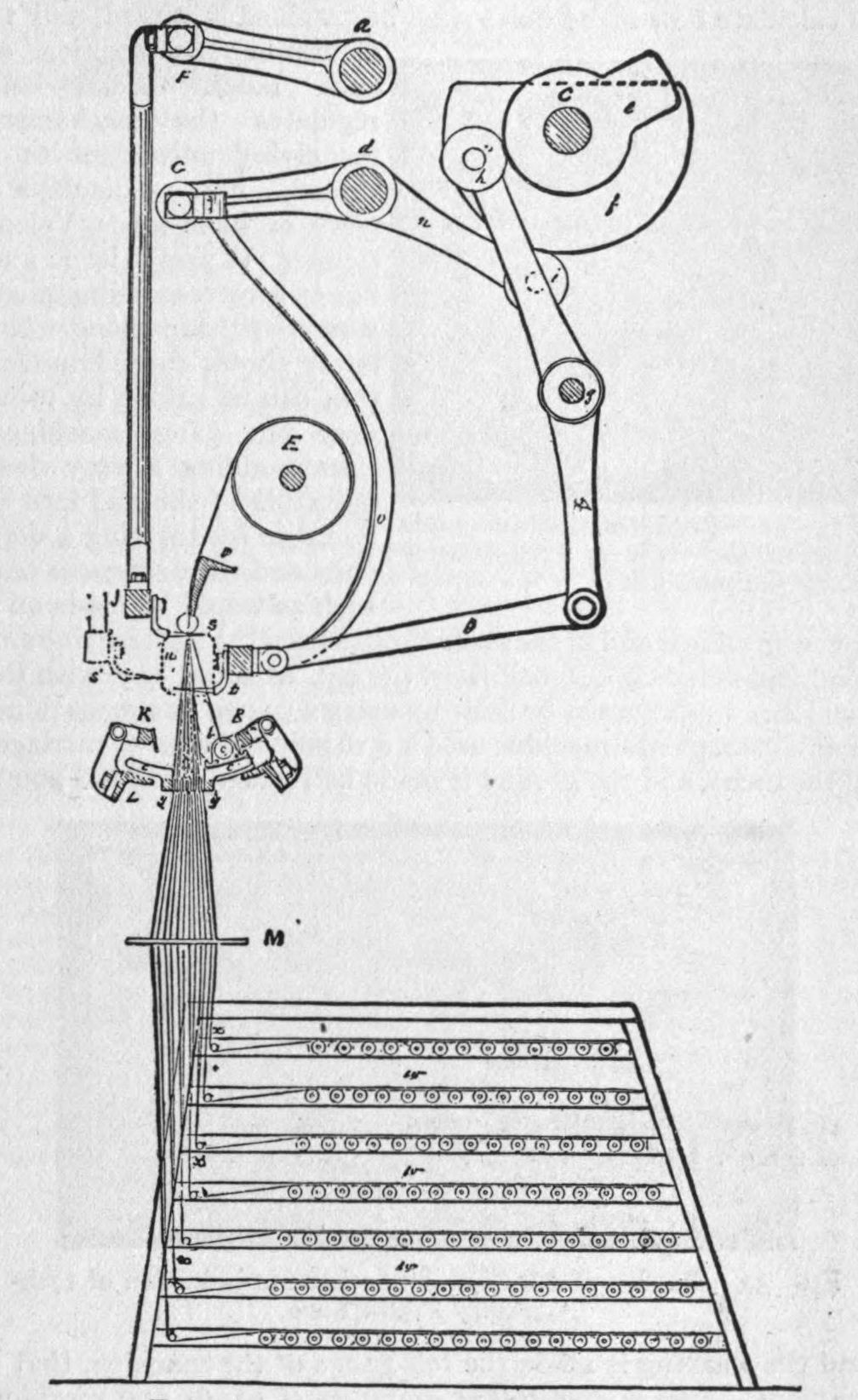
Section of a lace machine as shown in 1911 Encyclopædia Britannica. No Jacquard has been fitted.

== Description ==
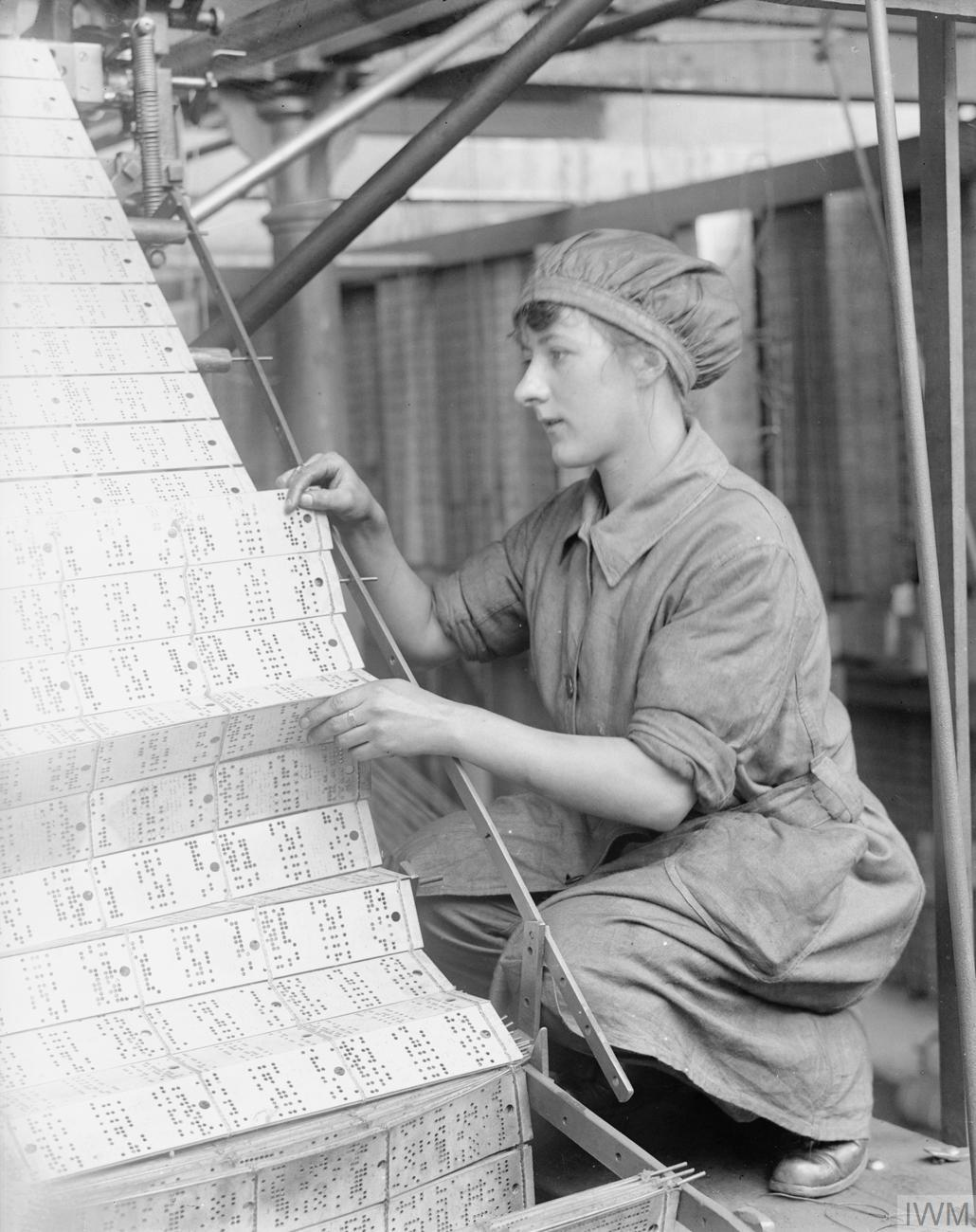
The Employment of Women in Britain, 1914-1918 Q28124

Viewed from the front, the frame is similar to that of a Leavers machine. However, its action is different, as it produces a square net rather than a hexagonal one. The Nottingham lace curtain machine only has one warp, and the patterning threads are carried on a spool, not on a beam. The terms to describe the actions are the same as those used for a Leavers machine: rise, fall, right, left, sley, carriage, comb etc. The lace is collected at the top, unlike the Pusher machine, where it is collected at the bottom. Collection is via a take-up beam; a spiky roller beneath it called the porcupine regulated the take-up tension.

=== The curtain machine ===
There are four groups of thread: warp, top board, bottom board and bobbin. On a 10-point, 360-inch machine there are four groups of 3,600 threads, making a total of 14,400 threads. (The term 'point' refers to the number of warps per inch.)

- The warp passes down the lace in straight lines. The warp beam is at the bottom; the thread passes through a sley, and then through the front guide bar (also known as the warp bar). The warp bar is controlled by a cam. All the warps remain in parallel; they cannot pattern. Their function is to generate the skeletal support for the fabric.
- The top board threads can act as both warp and weft - they can pillar to the weft, or they can shog gaits in the pattern as weft. The threads pass through tensioning springs, then through a sley and through holes in the back guide bar (third bar, coarse spool bar).
- The bottom board (also known as a Swiss board or occasionally beam) was not present in the early machines. It acts as the weft in both the ground and the pattern. This contains the finer threads. If the pattern is complex, spools must be used, but a beam can be used where the pattern is fairly even. The threads pass through a tensioning spring and through holes in the middle guide bar (also known as a Swiss bar or fine spool bar).
- The bobbin threads tie the top and bottom board threads to the pillars. The bobbin threads are carried on brass bobbins held in carriages that are swung back and forth on combs in a pushing and catching routine. Pillaring is controlled by the pillaring cam; when the net is being made the pillars must be connected, which can be done by the spool threads (top or bottom board). These are secured each time by the bobbin threads. Patterning or gimping is created by using longer shogs on the spool threads.

There are three guide bars controlled by work cams. These allow a shogging movement across 2, 3 or 4 gaits. The cams cannot be stopped, but threads in the middle and back bars can be interrupted by a Jacquard mechanism. Each bobbin thread has its own jack - a steel wire that can interrupt its movement and create a hole in the pattern, in effect leaving off a tie.

== Bibliography ==
- Earnshaw, Pat (1986). Lace Machines and Machine Laces. Batsford. ISBN 0713446846.
- Farrell, Jeremy (2007). "Identifying Handmade and Machine Lace" (PDF). DATS (Dress and Textile Specialists) in partnership with the V&A.
