= Pusher machine =

Lace making machine, based on the bobbinet

The Pusher machine was a lace making machine, based on the bobbinet, that was invented in 1812 by Samuel Clark and James Mart.

== Context ==
In 1812 Samuel Clark and James Mart(sic) constructed a machine that was capable of working a pattern and net at the same time. A pusher operated each bobbin and carriage independently, allowing almost unlimited designs and styles. The machine, however, was slow, delicate, costly, and could produce only short "webs" of about two by four yards. There is no record of the original specifications, but its origin is referenced in two patent applications made to improve it lodged in 1825, by Joseph Crowder of New Radford and his associates Messrs Hall and Day. Variations on the basic machine were the Crowder and Day's improved pusher and Kendall and Morley's machine.

The machine was modified by John Synyer in 1829 to allow for bullet holes to be inserted in the plain twist net. A modification was made in 1831 to copy blonde lace, and Marmaduke Miller adder a device to add loops and purls to the lace in 1827. Production had its heyday in the 1850s and ceased sometimes in the 1870s or 1880s.

== Machine ==
The warp beam was at the top, and the work roller at the bottom. There was a sley and a guide bar. The carriages with their bobbins (brass bobbins) slid on a concave comb (bolt). In the 1825 modification, the carriages were suspended from an upwardly arching comb. The carriages are propelled by individual pusher rods which strike the ears on the carriage. There was pusher bar (later there were four) but there is a fetcher bar (locker bar) which acts in conjunction with the pushers. It was slow and in the early machine, 14 actions were required to form each course; in 1825 this had been reduced to ten. The bobbins were necessarily small and this restricted the length of a single piece to about 4 metres. The actions were controlled by an organ barrel until the adoption of the Jacquard process in 1839. This was achieved by James Wright of Radford.

== Product ==
The bobbinet was best producing straight net, but the Pusher was slow and could be used to imitate handlace of any complexity, although it could not put in liners, leaving the impression of sharpness from the lace. During the reign of William IV, tatting and putting on fancies became popular, and the Pusher was in great demand. The pusher was particularly useful for making large shawls or capes in the style of Chantilly lace. It could replicate the grille or half-stitch, which defeated the Leavers machine. It could be hand lined using a Cornely machine.

Lace was dependent on fashion. In 1867, women stopped wearing shawls, and the Franco-Prussian War cut off the trade with France there was little market for this lace. The redundant Pushers were scrapped. In 1920, a retailer was advertising 'Real Alençon' machine lace produced on a Pusher in Lyon, France, and in 1959 there were a 'narrow range of silk nets' being produced on Pushers in Lyon.

== See also ==
- Timeline of clothing and textiles technology
