= John Leavers =

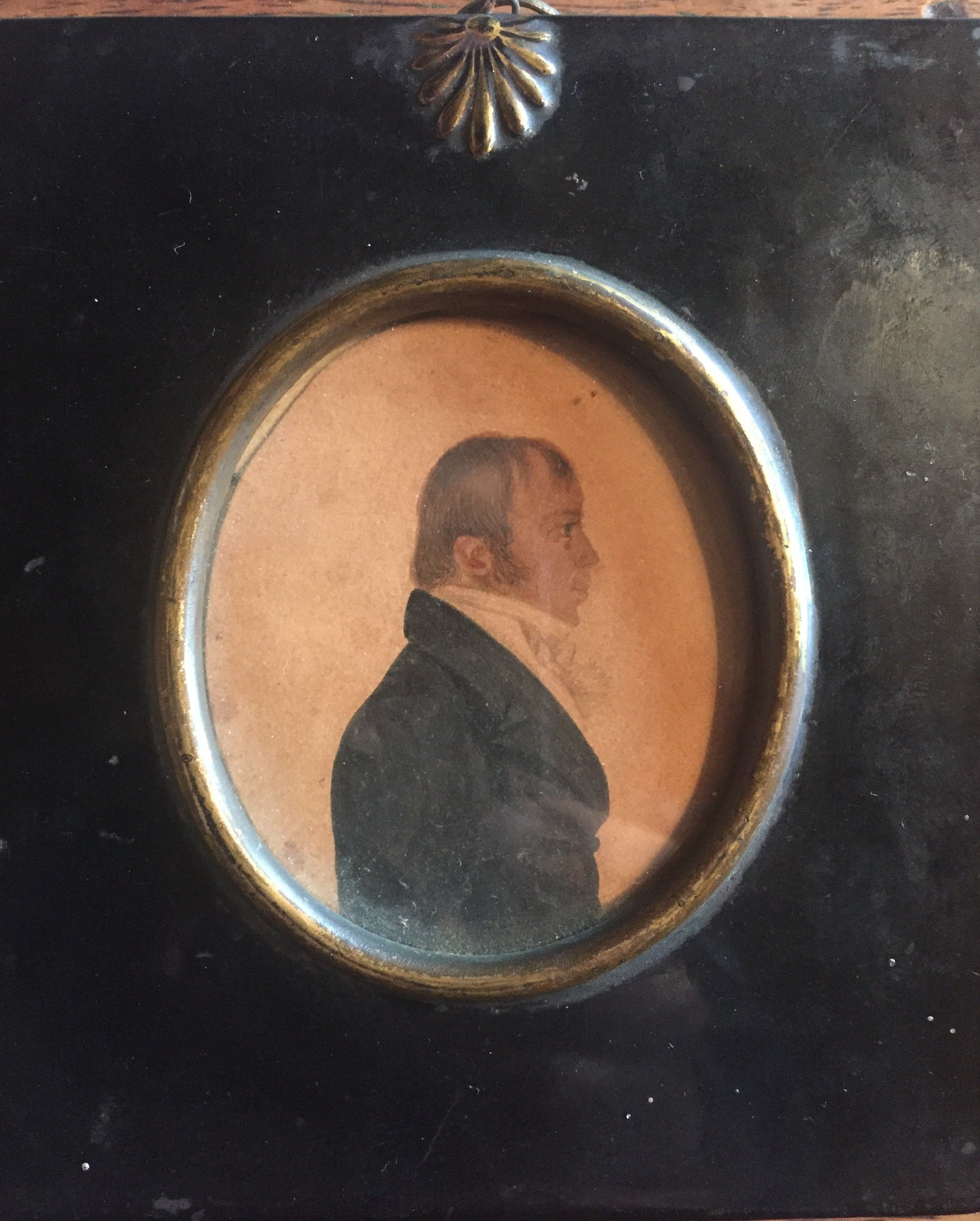
- John Leavers, c.1826. Painted China miniature — private collection of Bénédicte Meurice and Carmen Molins.
- Born: John Levers; 1786; Sutton-in-Ashfield, Nottinghamshire
- Died: 24 September 1848 (aged 62); Grand-Couronne
- Spouse(s): Hannah Wheeldon; Françoise Massiotty
- Children: 2 sons and 2 daughters
- Engineering career
- Discipline: Frame smith and setter up
- Projects: Improvement of John Heathcoat’s lace machine
- Significant advance: The Leavers machine
- Awards: Leavers lace received a prize at the Brussels International Exhibition in 1910

John Levers (later Leavers) (1786–1848) was an English mechanic and engineer, best known for improving John Heathcoat’s pioneering lace machine; the Leavers machine laid the foundation of the machine lace trade.

== Biography ==
John Levers was born in Sutton-in-Ashfield, Nottinghamshire, where he was baptized on 12 March 1786, the eldest son of John Levers and his wife, Ann, née Walker. He had three siblings: Joseph Levers (b. c.1796), a lace maker and a lace mechanic; Mary Levers (b. 1797), a lace runner; and Thomas Levers (b. 1800), a machine-maker.

Little is known about the early part of his life in Nottinghamshire, which—including Sutton—was the heart of the English hosiery industry, and where machine-made lace first developed. The Nottingham manufacturer and historian William Felkin stated that, in 1813–14, Levers, a ‘frame smith and setter up’, had improved John Heathcoat’s pioneering lace machine thanks to his ‘mechanical genius and skill’, which ‘proved to be very great, as was shewn by the extraordinary results’.

In 1821 the Levers brothers (John, Joseph, Thomas), their sister Mary, their mother, as well as John’s and Joseph’s wives and Mary’s future husband, emigrated to Grand-Couronne (Seine-Maritime) on the river Seine in Normandy; here, the ‘Levers’ became the ‘Leavers’, probably for phonetic reasons. In Grand-Couronne a lace workshop was converted to a factory belonging to Louis-Paul Lefort, and John and Thomas Leavers then played a key part in its development. In 1833 they patented a new frame. The technical reputation of Leavers, who ran the factory, was established. In 1834 and 1839, Leavers was praised by a national jury. In the 1836 and 1841 censuses, ‘Jean Leavers’ was still listed as a mechanic.

== Family life ==
In 1813, Levers married Hannah Wheeldon (1783/4–1824) in Nottingham. It seems that they had no children. Hannah died in Grand-Couronne on 25 July 1824. On 1 February 1826 the widowed Leavers married a Belgian woman who lived in Grand-Couronne, Françoise Massiotty (b. 1791/2). They had at least four children: Guillaume Jean, born on 5 November 1826; Sara Elisabeth, born c.1828; Edouard Alphonse, born c.1829; and Marie Stéphanie Ambroise, born on 4 April 1835.

Leavers died in Grand-Couronne on 24 September 1848. He was remembered as

the sole inventor of the Leavers machine ... He was band-master to the National Guards, and was attended with military honors to his grave, by the mayor and National Guards of his regiment; and was honored and respected by all who knew him.

== Posterity ==
Grand-Couronne, as well as lace towns Calais (Pas-de-Calais) and Caudry (Nord), where John Leavers never lived, have a street named after him. There is also a grey plaque in Canning Circus, Nottingham: ‘In this house lived John Leavers, inventor of the Leavers lace machine 1813.’

As for the Leavers machines, they were sold worldwide until the 1960s.
