= Bobbinet =

Hexagonal machine-made net fabric used in lacemaking

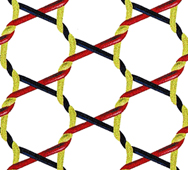
The hexagonal structure of bobbinet

Bobbinet tulle or genuine tulle is a specific type of tulle which has been made in the United Kingdom since the invention of the bobbinet machine. John Heathcoat coined the term "bobbin net", or bobbinet as it is spelled today, to distinguish this machine-made tulle from the handmade "pillow lace", produced using a lace pillow to create bobbin lace. Machines based on his original designs are still in operation today producing fabrics in Perry Street, Chard, Somerset, UK.

When bobbinet is woven with spots, it is called point d'esprit.

== History ==
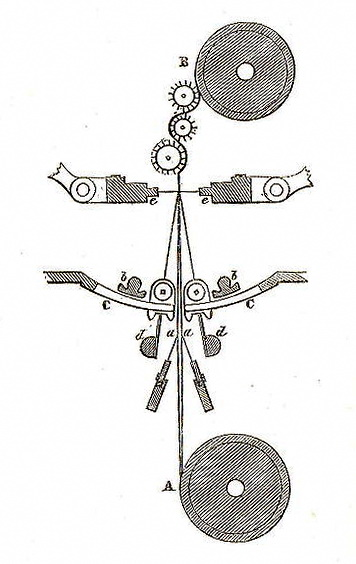
Bobbinet (métier bobin) schematic. The bobbinet framework consists of: A - Warp beam; B - Lace take up roller; C - Represents the combs or guides, with two brass-bobbins in their carriers.; Two combs/guides were used, as the technology could not produce a brass-bobbin 0.05 in (1.3 mm) thick but 0.10 in (2.5 mm) was do-able, so two ends shared one comb. The combs in were integral to the front comb bar and rear comb bar, which could shog 1 thread space sideways. The bobbins were propelled by front driver bars and back driver bars which were above the comb bar.

The forerunner of bobbinet tulle was bobbin lace. Lace has been produced for a long time, made in tedious hand labour with thin thread and needles or bobbins. Bobbin lace is made by weaving the threads by moving the bobbins over or under each other. Much bobbin lace is based on a net ground. By the end of the 18th century, people tried to produce the net ground mechanically. In 1765, they managed to create a tulle-like fabric on a so-called stocking framework. It took, however, some more years until the first real tulle could be produced mechanically.

The forerunner of the bobbinet machine was the 1589 stocking frame, a weaving frame fitted with a bar of bearded needles that passed back and forth, to and from the operator. There was no warp. The beards were simultaneously depressed by a presser bar catching the weft and holding it back a course making a row of loops. After Strutt had modified the machine in 1759 to do ribbing, Hammond in 1764 used a tickler stick to transfer the loops 2 or 3 gaits sideways, and mechanic lace making was born. There was no carriage, no comb and the operations continued to be done in sequence by the operator.

Bobbinet lace machines were invented in 1808 by John Heathcoat. He studied the hand movements of a Northamptonshire manual lace maker and reproduced them in the roller-locker machine. Heathcoat's machine was patented in 1808 (patent no. 3151), and with a slight modification it was patented again in 1809 (patent no. 3216), with the 1809 version becoming known as the 'Old Loughborough'. The improved machine was 18 inches (46 cm) wide, and designed for use with cotton.

Heathcoat continued to improve his machine over the years, but a number of breaches of his patent also came into production. The 'Circular' was an improvement on the machine designed in 1824 by William Morley (patent no.4921). As it gained ascendency, its distinctive name was dropped; it became the bobbinet machine, and Heathcoat's machine the Old Loughborough.

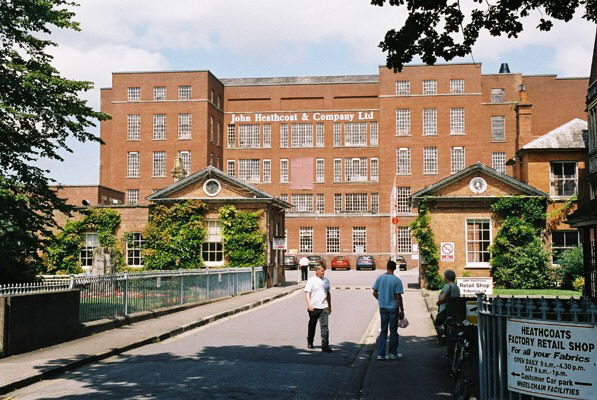
John Heathcoat's current factory in Tiverton, on the site of his original factory.

The 'Old Loughborough' became the standard lacemaking machine, particularly the 1824 form known as the 'Circular', producing two-twist plain net. The smooth, unpatterned tulle produced on these machines was on a par with real, handmade lace net. Heathcoat's bobbinet machine was so effective that modern bobbinet machines have altered little from his original design. During the next 30 years, inventors were patenting improvements to their machines. The ones that stand out are the Pusher machine, the Levers machine (now spelled Leavers) and the Nottingham lace curtain machine. Each of these developed into separate machines. Others were the Traverse Warp machine and the Straight Bolt machine.

== Fabric structure ==
Bobbinet tulle is constructed by warp and weft yarns in which the weft yarn is looped diagonally around the vertical warp yarn to form a hexagonal mesh which is regular and clearly defined. Bobbinet netting has a characteristic diagonal fabric appearance, is diagonally stable and slideproof, durable, sheer, the lightest bobbinet weighing no more than 6 g/m^{2} (0.0012 lb/sq ft), with a high strength to weight ratio.

== Uses ==
Bobbinet tulle fabrics have long been used for high-quality exclusive curtains, bridalwear, haute couture fashion, lingerie, embroidery, where it is used as base cloth for the actual embroidery, and as base nets for high-quality wigs.

Use has also extended into technical applications where the material's properties are more important than its appearance. These technical applications include sunblinds for cars and railway coaches, safety nets, parachute skirting, radar reflective fabrics for military decoys, flexible textile switches and sensor, as well as light control fabrics for the film and theatre industries. Depending on the yarns bobbinet tulle is produced with, it can, for example, be made to be almost invisible against the skin or even conductive.

== Bibliography ==
- Earnshaw, Pat (1986). Lace Machines and Machine Laces. B.T. Batsford. ISBN 0-7134-4684-6.
