= Leavers machine =

Lacemaking machine invented by John Levers

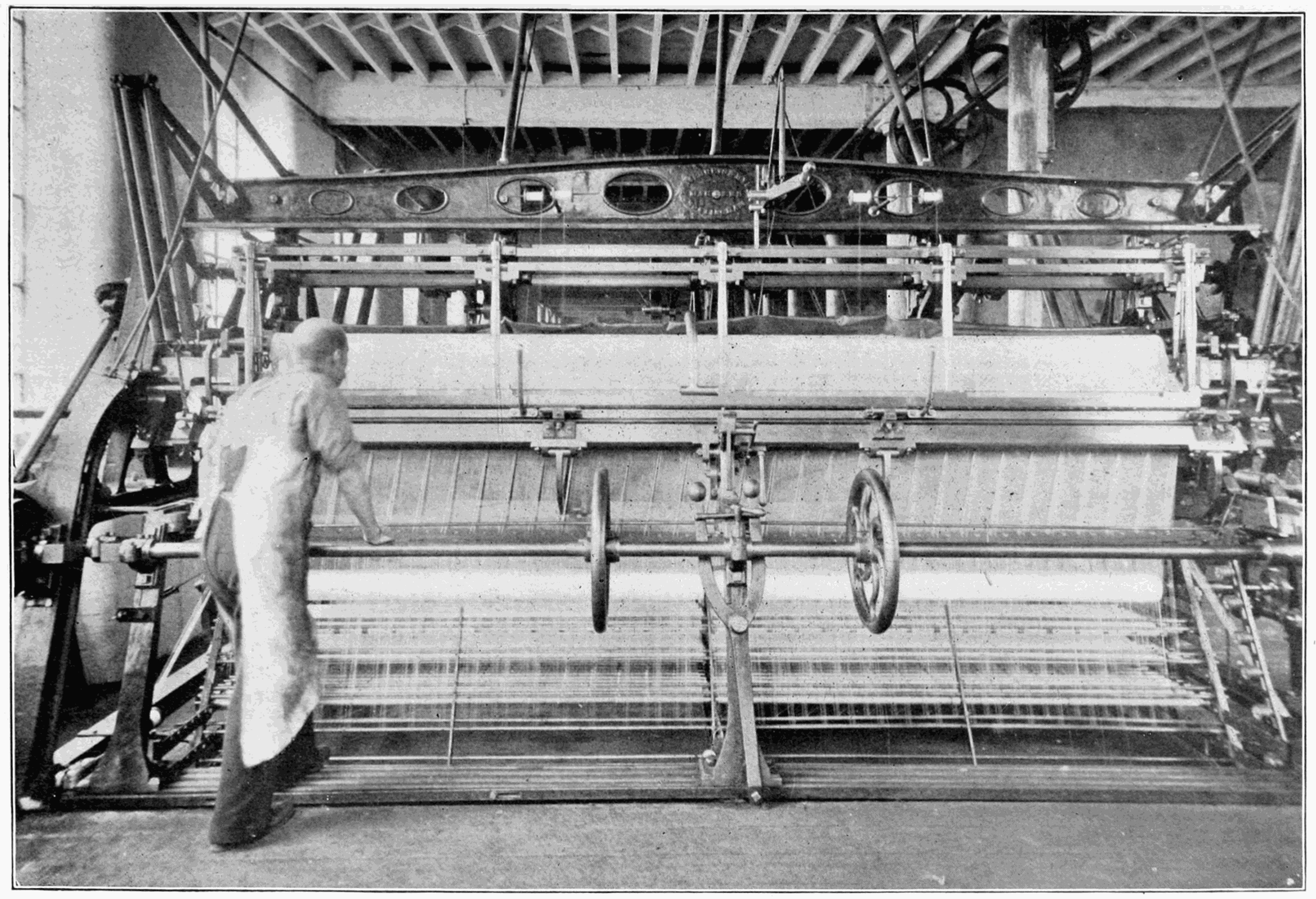
Leavers lace machines

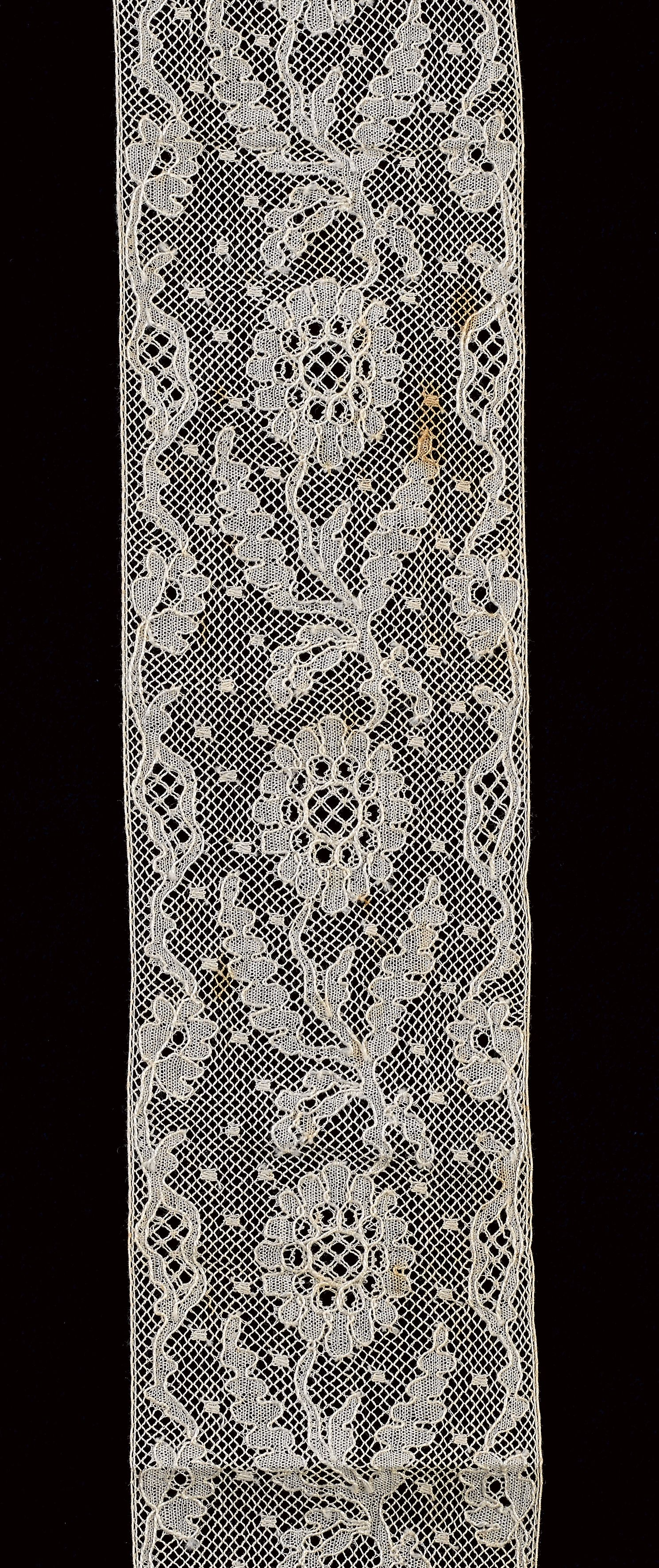
Border (ST293) - Lace-Machine Lace - MoMu Antwerp

The Leavers machine is a lacemaking machine that was adapted from Heathcoat's Old Loughborough machine by John Levers (the 'a' was added to aid pronunciation in France). It was made in Nottingham in 1813. The original machine made net but it was discovered that the Jacquard apparatus could be adapted to it. From 1841 lace complete with pattern, net and outline could be made on the Leavers machine.

== History ==
Most lace machines stem from the weft-knitting stocking frame. The Leavers machine is a derivative of Heathcoat's 1809 Old Loughborough. The Leavers machine was invented by John Levers, a framesmith and setter-up of Sutton-in-Ashfield. Sources give the date as either 1813 or 1814, and the location as Derby Road, Nottingham. Patent applications up until 1930 spelled the name without an 'a', but about 1906, foreign sources had started to insert an 'a'. The Lace working party of 1946 standardised the name with an 'a' and the trade association henceforth adopted that spelling.

Until 1823 they were used solely to make plain net, working on a 60 inch beam at 80 motions per minute

In 1828 an improvement was made to drive the bobbin carriage at intervals, thus leaving time for 'shogging' the guide bars between each movement. In 1841 use of a knob Jacquard allowed the insertion of thick thread (liner). The knobs allowed a greater distance and allowed the automatic gimping around flowered patterns.

The number of Leavers in use was dependent on the market and during periods of depression or cotton shortage many frames were broken up for their iron content. The use of Raschel machines, noted for being better for artificial fibres increased in the 1970s and, with fine polyesters, the two products have converged.

=== United States context ===
Before 1909 there were only 100 Leavers machines in the United States. Importing was prohibitively expensive due to a 45% import tariff. The US lost many soldiers to malaria in a skirmish in Spanish America, and a need for mosquito netting was seen. The US Tariff Act of 1909 provided free entry for Leavers machines, during a 19 month window from 6 August 1909 to 31 December 1910. Thus by 1947 there were 730 machines in 54 mills employing 5000 people.

The 'twist-hands' were mainly emigrants from the lace making areas of France and England, as operating the machine was a complex process to learn. The Amalgamated Lace Operators of America, Leavers Section considered a three year apprenticeship to be the minimum and longer to be fully effective.

== Description ==
=== The lace machine ===
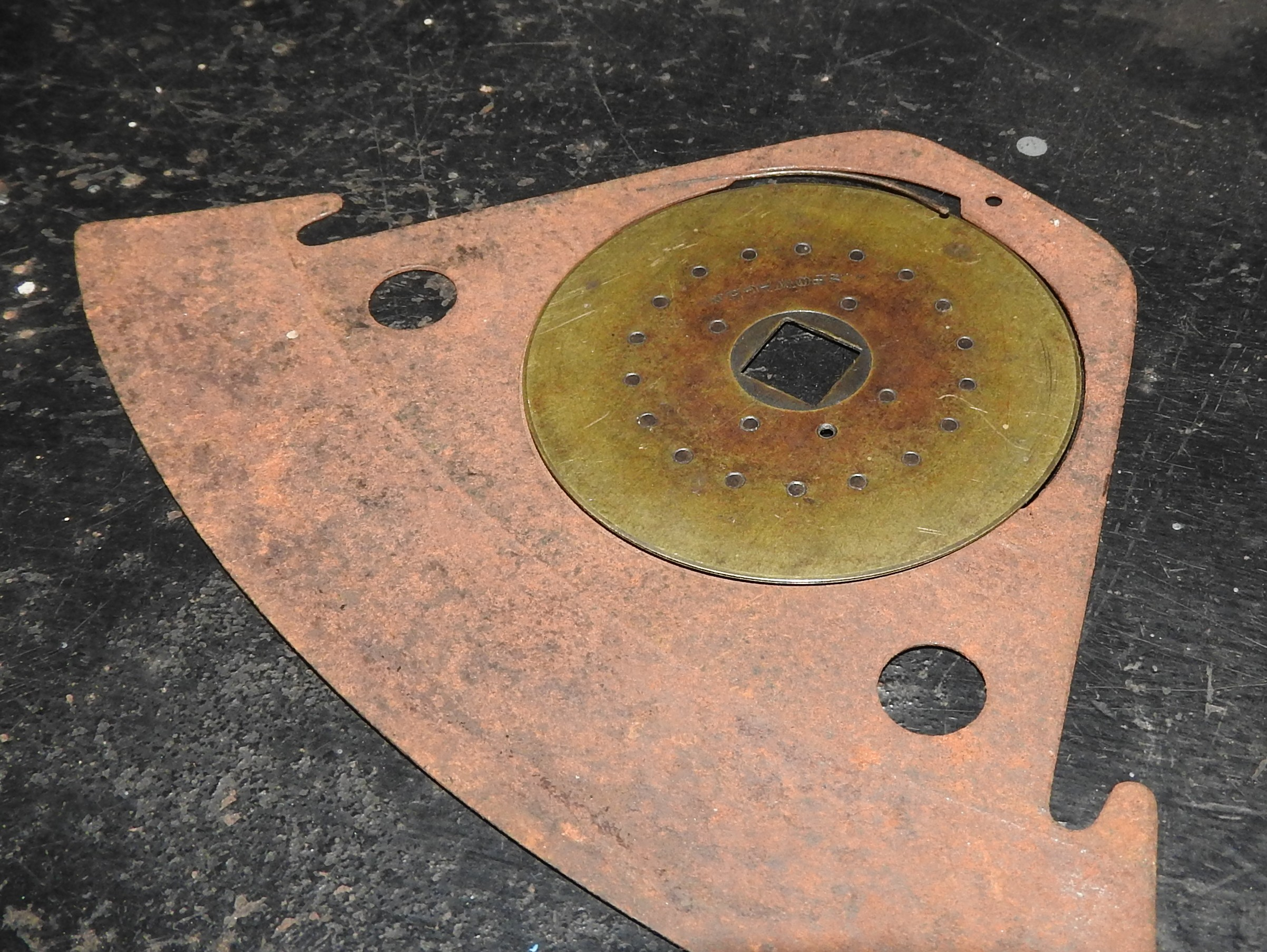
The brass bobbin in the carriage which move in a cradle between the warp threads

The Leavers machine is probably the most versatile of all machines for making patterned lace. A 120 inches (300 cm) machine will weigh 17 tons and have 40,000 moving parts and carry between 12,000 and 50,000 threads. Working widths are always multiples of 9 inches (230 mm) since the web is calculated in quarter yards.

It has two warp beams, though it can be run using just one or none. An S-twist thread is out on the front warp (right warp) and a Z- twist on the back warp (left warp, reverse warp). All the warp ends pass through a sley with individual perforations- to keep the threads from tangling. On a machine with 3000 front warp ends, that will mean 6000 perforations, all front warp ends will be of the same count, and all back warp ends will be of the same count, though the two warps can carry different counts. The warp threads interact with the brass bobbin threads to form the net or openwork ground. The reverse warp threads (introduced in 1830) lock the front warp threads against the bobbin threads. The warp threads are tensioned by a spring.

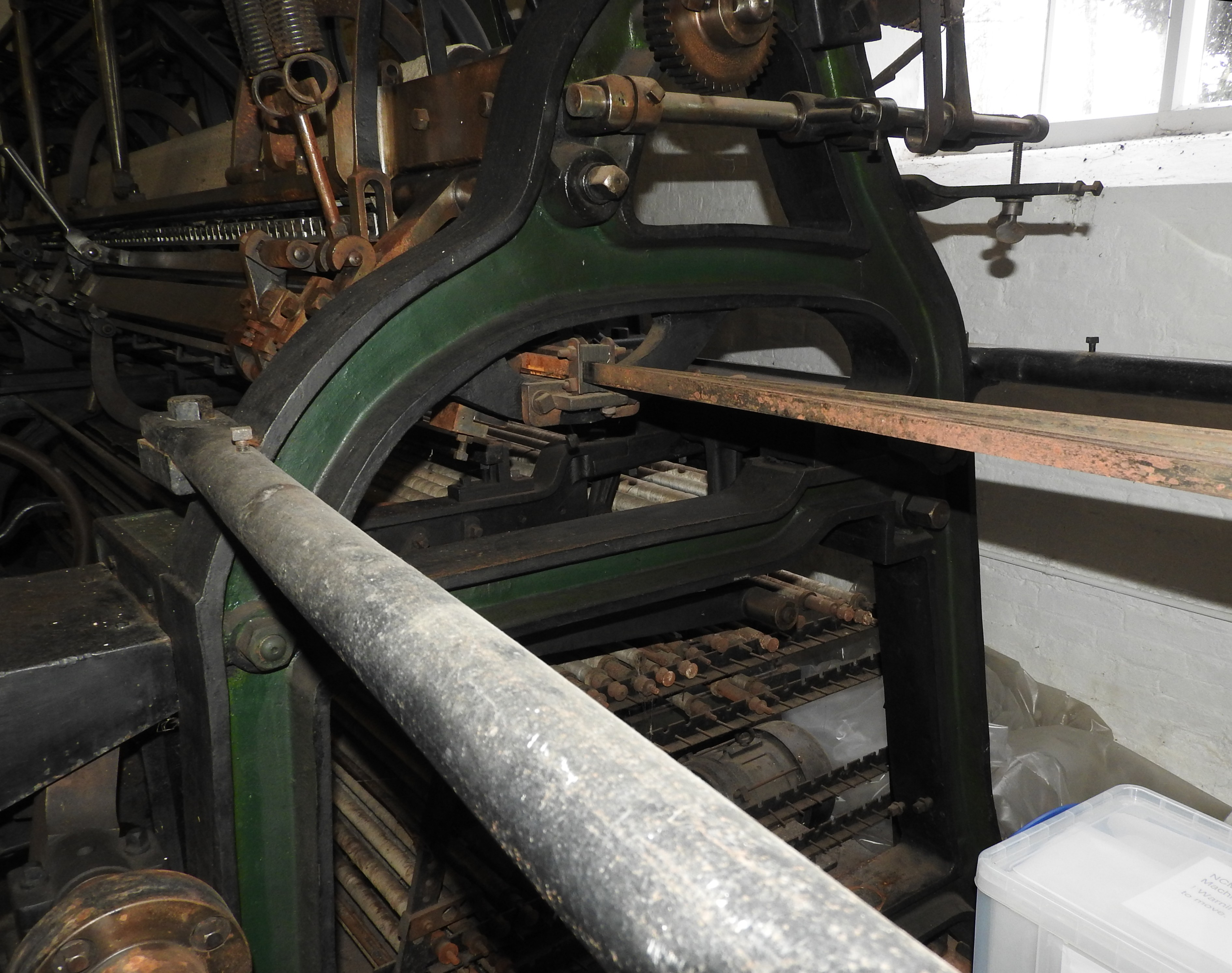
The heavy connector to the Jacquard unit, with the individual guide bars (Photo. Nottingham Industrial Museum)

Beams are the vertical threads from a beam roller that contributes to the pattern. Lace is made up of motif that is repeated vertically and horizontally. If a design has 48 horizontal repeats, there will be 48 threads on each beam roller. Every beam roller has its own guidebar, made of thin watch-spring steel. Each front warp ends has its own guidebar. The back warp ends share 4 stump bars between them. The guide bars are controlled by the Jacquards so can be reposition for each motion, indeed they are also known as Jacquard bars; they are held in a bar box above the sley but below the carriages.

=== The process ===
There are up to 32 processes involved in designing and producing a run of Leavers lace, To start with, there are 5 five processes in transferring the initial art work to the machine. There are nine processes needed to prepare the 4 types of yarn. The single process of running the machine and up to 14 finishing processes, thus there is a lot of ancillary equipment.

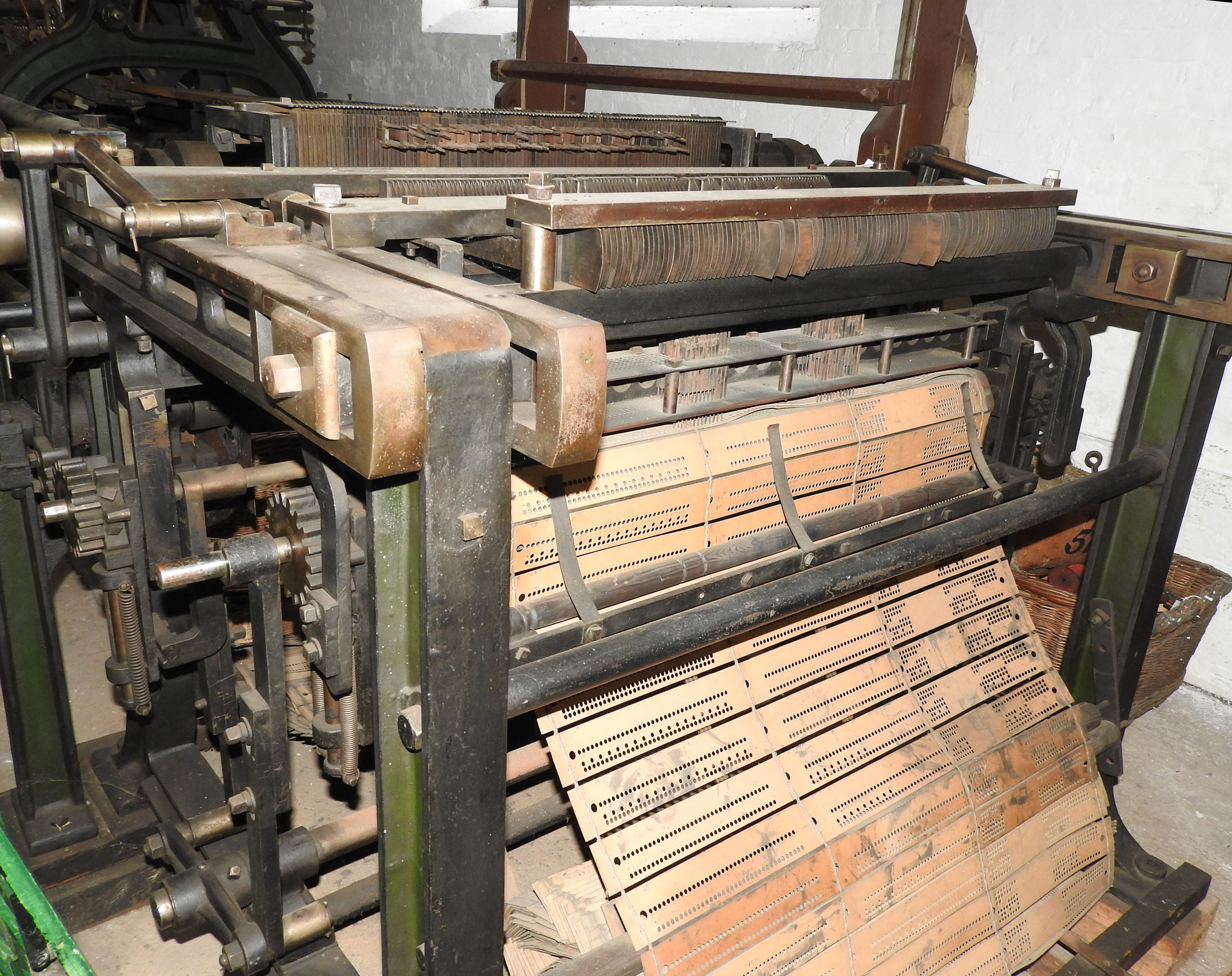
The Jacquard in place

The art work is designed six times life size and reduced using a pantograph. The design is converted to the Jacquard code and punched onto the Jacquard cards. The cards are stitched and mounted on the Jacquard.

The thread arrives either on cones or in skeins. It has to be slip wound onto spools. There are four types of yarn used in Leavers machine

- The heavy warp thread that needs to be warped from a creel of spools or cones onto a warp beam. There will be one thread for each end. There are two set of warp thread, right twist and left twist,- one used for stability and the other used for twisting.

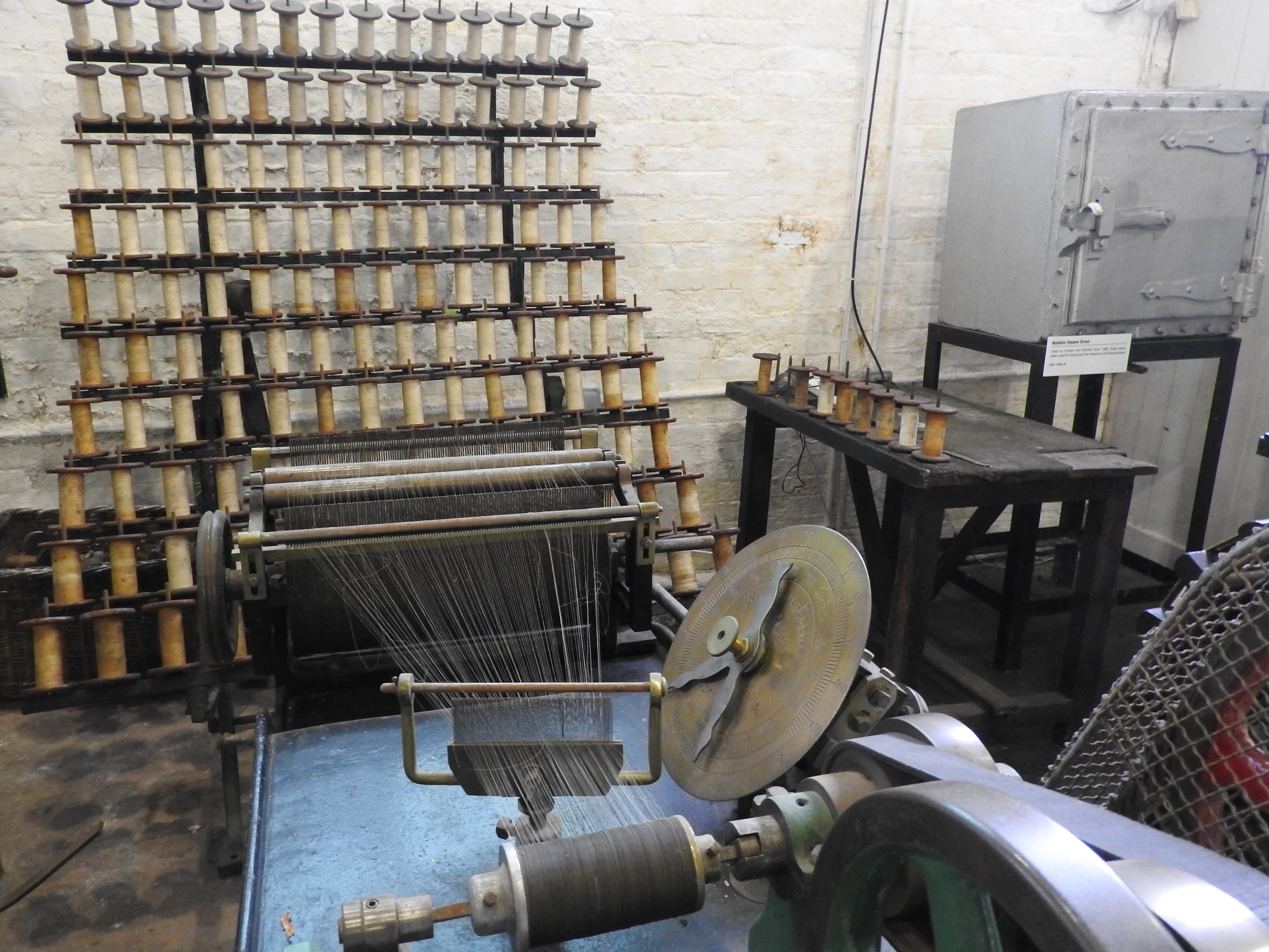
Bobbin winding unit- taking 140 bobbins

- The brass bobbin yarns are wound on special brass bobbin winding units, with the spools held on jack stands. and then these brass bobbins are compressed by 25% at a pressure of 20 tons per square inch. They are then steamed and cooled. These have to be manually placed in the carrier and held by a spring. The thread needs to be laced to the previous one On depletion of the first bobbin, the whole set is removed and goes through a stripper.
- The skein yarns which gimp the warps are spooled on to a beam and then beamed onto the machine.
- The liner threads are spooled onto a beam

The finishing processes are clipping, scalloping, drawing, cutting, hand cutting, cloth looking and mending and the familiar textile processes such as bleaching, dyeing, stretching to width, drying, folding and packing.

== See also ==
- Pusher machine
- Nottingham lace curtain machine
