= John Heathcoat =

English inventor and politician (1783–1861)

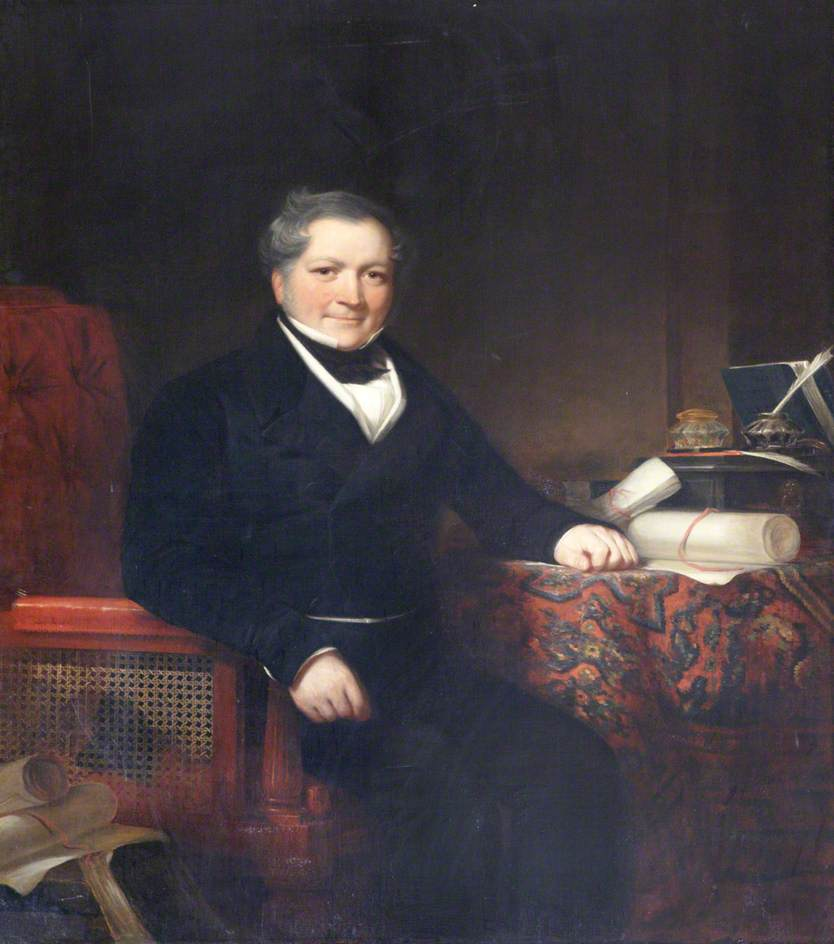
- Portrait by William Beetham
- Born: 7 August 1783; Duffield, Derbyshire, England
- Died: 18 January 1861 (aged 77); Tiverton, Devon, England

John Heathcoat (7 August 1783 – 18 January 1861) was an English inventor and politician. During his apprenticeship he made an improvement to the warp-weighted loom, so as to produce mitts of a lace-like appearance. He set up his own business in Hathern but then set up a new factory in Loughborough. After this new factory was attacked by former Luddites in 1816, who were based in Nottingham, he moved the business to Tiverton in Devon where it became most successful and established the Tiverton lace-making industry.

== Early life ==
Heathcoat was born on 7 August 1783, at Duffield, Derbyshire, and was apprenticed to a frame-smith at Long Whatton but soon changed to another framesmith at Hathern.

== Career ==
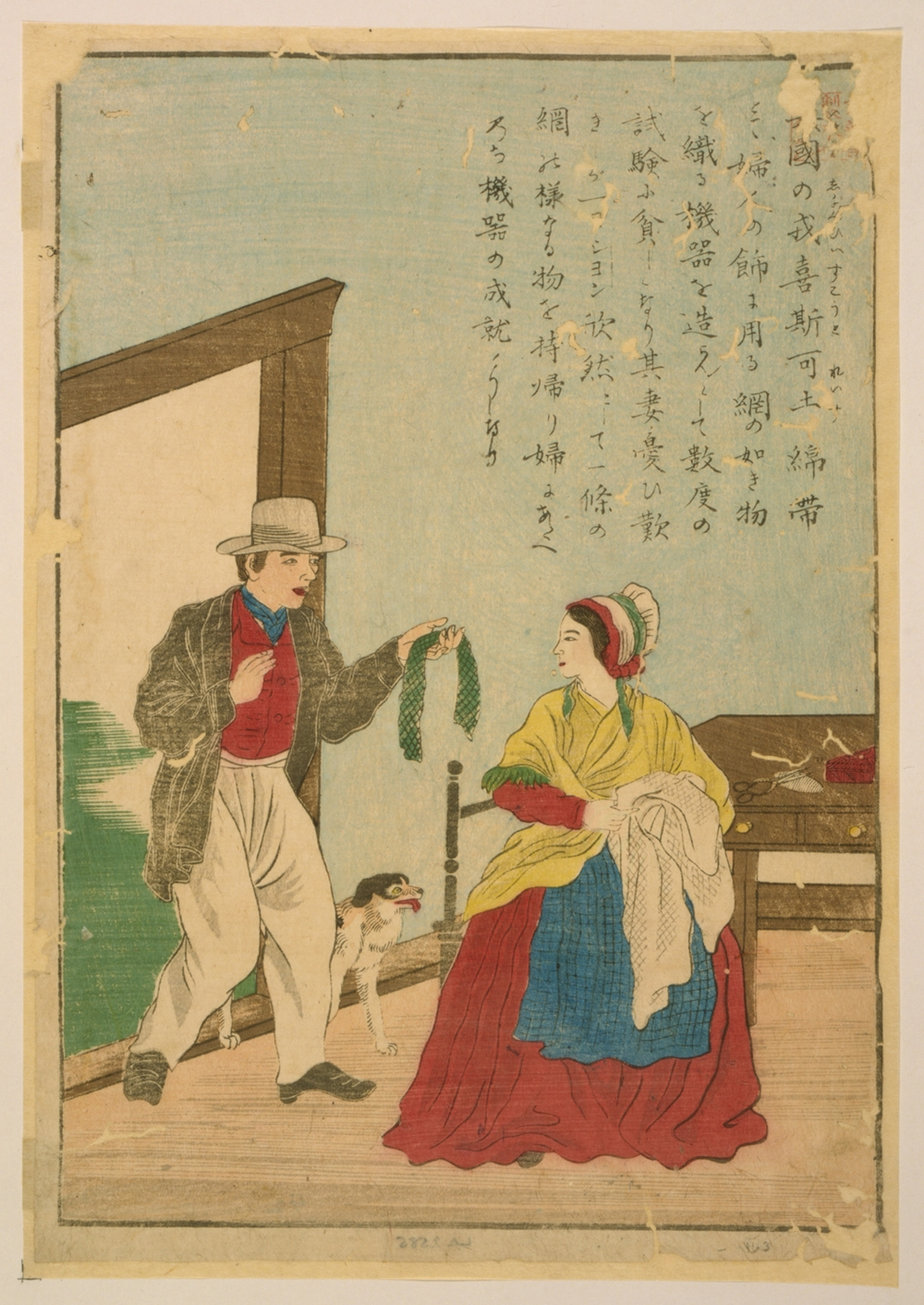
Japanese print on hōsho paper showing Heathcoat displaying the first successful result from his knitting machine to his wife.

=== Leicestershire ===
During his apprenticeship he made an improvement in the construction of the warp-loom, so as to produce mitts of a lace-like appearance by means of it. He began business on his own account at Nottingham, but finding himself subjected to the intrusion of competing inventors he removed to Hathern (near Loughborough) in Leicestershire. In 1808, he constructed a machine capable of producing an exact imitation of real pillow-lace. This machine-made lace was also called "English net" or bobbinet.

This was by far the most expensive and complex textile apparatus until then existing; and in describing the process of his invention Heathcoat said in 1836, "The single difficulty of getting the diagonal threads to twist in the allotted space was so great that, if now to be done, I should probably not attempt its accomplishment." Some time before perfecting his invention, which he patented in 1809, he removed to Loughborough, where he entered into partnership with Charles Lacy, a Nottingham manufacturer; but in 1816 their factory was attacked by former Luddites, thought to be in the pay of the lacemakers of Nottingham, and their 55 lace frames were destroyed. The damages were assessed in compensation by the King's Bench at £10,000; but as Heathcoat declined to expend the money in the county of Leicester he never received any part of it.

=== Tiverton ===
Heathcoat bought an unoccupied woollen mill in Tiverton, Devon. In fact he was overseeing work in Tiverton when the attack in Loughborough took place. He wrote to the Mayor of Tiverton, asking for protection for the mill there, and in the letter disclosed:

"I have great apprehension of an immediate attack at this place also. In fact I believe the real cause of this mischief being done is principally, if not wholly, owing to the offence of removing here, and I have been informed upon undoubted authority that the Nottingham Lace Makers have sworn my entire destruction"

Undaunted by his loss, he continued to construct new and greatly improved machines in his new factory in Tiverton, propelling them by water-power and afterwards by steam. His claim to the invention of the twisting and traversing lace machine was disputed, and a patent was taken out by a clever workman for a similar machine, which was decided at a trial in 1816 to be an infringement of Heathcoat's patent. He followed his great invention by others of much ability, as, for instance, contrivances for ornamenting net while in course of manufacture and for making ribbons and platted and twisted net upon his machines, improved yarn spinning-frames, and methods for winding raw silk from cocoons. An offer of £10,000 was made to him in 1833 for the use of his processes in dressing and finishing silk nets, but he allowed the highly profitable secret to remain undivulged.

In 1832, he patented a steam plough, a full-size version of which was built and demonstrated ploughing Red Moss in Bolton-le-Moors to a Scottish delegation in April 1837. The Royal Highland and Agricultural Society of Scotland awarded him £100 out of a possible £500 of its prize for creating a steam ploughing engine.

In 1854, he gave the site for St Paul's Church, Tiverton and in 1856 paid the cost of installing the organ.

== Parliament ==
Heathcoat was elected Member of Parliament (MP) for Tiverton in 1832. Though he seldom spoke in the House of Commons, he was constantly engaged on committees, where his thorough knowledge of business and sound judgment were highly valued. He retained his seat until 1859, and after two years of declining health he died on 18 January 1861 at Bolham House, near Tiverton.

== Death and legacy ==
Heathcoat died on 18 January 1861, aged 77, in Tiverton, Devon. His grandson was businessman and politician John Heathcoat-Amory, 1st Baronet.

== See also ==
- John Farey Jr.

Parliament of the United Kingdom
Preceded by Spencer Perceval; Granville Ryder	Member of Parliament for Tiverton; 1832–1859; With: James Kennedy to 1835; The Viscount Palmerston from 1835	Succeeded by George Denman; The Viscount Palmerston
