= 1889 United Kingdom local elections =

Resulting party control by county council.

Elections to the municipal and county councils of England and Wales were held in 1889. Elections to the various county councils were held in January 1889. Progressive candidates won a majority on London County Council, although at this point party labels were relatively unimportant, with municipal and county politics in Victorian Britain being somewhat detached from national politics, and national political divisions. Liberal candidates would do particularly well in Wales however, winning clear majorities in 11 of Wales' 13 counties. The Liberals only failed to take Brecknockshire and Radnorshire, which had hung councils. In the English counties the Liberals took only Cumberland, Holland, London, and the West Riding, with most councils being run on a non-party basis.

The elections were the first following the Local Government Act 1888 (51 & 52 Vict. c. 41), which had established county councils and county borough councils in England and Wales. Prior to the act there had been no elected body at the county level, with counties being governed by justices of the peace in Quarter Sessions.

A similar act - the Local Government (Scotland) Act 1889 - would later establish county councils in Scotland. Irish local governance would remain unreformed until 1898, and the passing of the Local Government (Ireland) Act 1898.

== Results ==
=== England ===
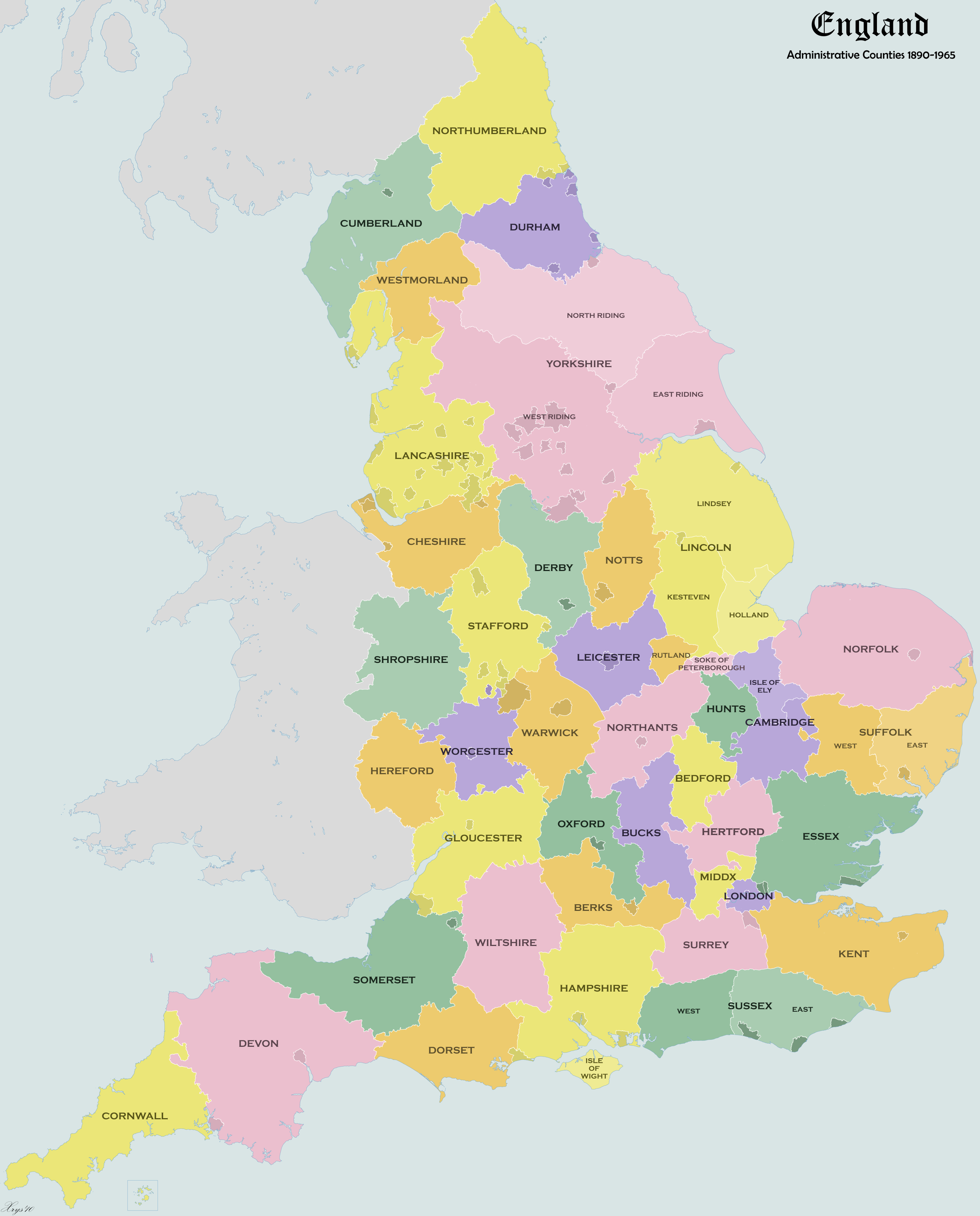
English administrative counties, 1890-1965.

Representation by divisions on the London County Council. Liberals held a majority.

Council	Result	Details
Bedfordshire	Independent	Details
Berkshire	Independent	Details
Buckinghamshire	Independent	Details
Cambridgeshire	Independent	Details
Cheshire	Independent	Details
Cornwall	Independent	Details
Cumberland	Liberal	Details
Derbyshire	Independent	Details
Devon	Independent	Details
Dorset	Independent	Details
Durham	Independent	Details
East Suffolk	Independent	Details
East Sussex	Independent	Details
Essex	Independent	Details
Gloucestershire	Independent	Details
Hampshire	Independent	Details
Herefordshire	Independent	Details
Hertfordshire	Independent	Details
Holland	Liberal	Details
Huntingdonshire	Independent	Details
Isle of Ely	Independent	Details
Kent	Independent	Details
Kesteven	Independent	Details
Lancashire	Independent	Details
Leicestershire	Independent	Details
Lindsey	Independent	Details
London	Progressive	Details
Middlesex	Independent	Details
Nottinghamshire	No overall control	Details
East Riding	Independent	Details
North Riding	Independent	Details
West Riding	Liberal	Details
West Suffolk	Independent	Details
West Sussex	Independent	Details
Westmorland	Independent	Details
Wiltshire	Independent	Details
Worcestershire	Independent	Details

=== Wales ===
Council	Result	Details
Anglesey	Liberal	Details
Brecknockshire	No overall control	Details
Carnarvonshire	Liberal	Details
Cardiganshire	Liberal	Details
Carmarthenshire	Liberal	Details
Denbighshire	Liberal	Details
Flintshire	Liberal	Details
Glamorgan	Liberal	Details
Merionethshire	Liberal	Details
Monmouthshire	Liberal	Details
Montgomeryshire	Liberal	Details
Pembrokeshire	Liberal	Details
Radnorshire	No overall control	Details

== See also ==
- United Kingdom national and local elections
- United Kingdom by-election records
