= 1892 Merionethshire County Council election =

Local election in Wales

The second election to the Merionethshire County Council was held in March 1892. They were preceded by the 1889 election and followed by the 1895 election.

== Overview of the result ==
The Liberals held their large majority with most seats being uncontested.

== Unopposed Returns ==
At the inaugural election the majority of seats had been contested, and in many cases the majorities were very small. By 1892, however, most wards were uncontested.

== Contested Elections ==
There were a large number of contested elections and the majorities were small in most instances. In most cases there were contests between Liberal and Conservative candidates.

== The New Council ==
The first meeting of the council was held in Dolgellau.

== Summary of Results ==
This section summarises the detailed results which are noted in the following sections. This was the inaugural county election and therefore no comparison can be made with the previous elections. One councillor was described as an Independent candidate but was also grouped in some reports with the Conservatives.

This table summarises the result of the elections in all wards. 42 councillors were elected.

Merionethshire County Council 1889: elected members
Party	Seats	Gains	Losses	Net gain/loss	Seats %	Votes %	Votes	+/−
Liberal	33							
Conservative	8							
Independent	1							

This table summarises the position following the election of aldermen. Eight were elected from among the elected members and eight from outside the council. This brought the total number of councillors and aldermen to 56.

Merionethshire County Council 1889 : following election of new aldermen
Party	Seats	Gains	Losses	Net gain/loss	Seats %	Votes %	Votes	+/−
Liberal	43	10		+11				
Conservative	9	1		+1				
Independent	1			0				

This table summarises the position following the by-elections for the three seats vacated following the election of aldermen. Technically these were new seats, taking the total number of councillors to 56. However, the Liberals defended three seats.

Merionethshire County Council 1889 : following by-elections
Party	Seats	Gains	Losses	Net gain/loss	Seats %	Votes %	Votes	+/−
Liberal	46	3	0	0				
Conservative	9	0	0	0				
Independent	1							

== Results ==
=== Aberdovey District ===
Enoch Lewis, Balkan Hill, standing as an Independent defeated William Jones, Sea View Terrace. The previous member sat as a Conservative.

Aberdovey District 1892
Party	Candidate	Votes	%	±%
Independent	Enoch Lewis	93		
Liberal	William Jones	81		
Majority		12		

=== Bala District ===
Bala District 1892
Party	Candidate	Votes	%	±%
Liberal	Evan Jones	unopposed		

=== Barmouth Urban District ===
Barmouth Urban District 1892
Party	Candidate	Votes	%	±%
Liberal	Lewis Lewis*	Unopposed		

=== Bowydd (two seats) ===
Bowydd 1892
Party	Candidate	Votes	%	±%
Liberal	David Griffith Williams*	unopposed		

=== Conglywal District ===
Conglywal District 1892
Party	Candidate	Votes	%	±%
Liberal	Robert Roberts*	unopposed		

=== Corris ===
Corris 1892
Party	Candidate	Votes	%	±%
Liberal	Morris Thomas*	unopposed		

=== Corwen, Northern Division ===
Corwen, Northern Division 1892
Party	Candidate	Votes	%	±%
Liberal	William Ffoulkes Jones*	unopposed		

=== Corwen, Southern Division ===
Corwen, Southern Division 1892
Party	Candidate	Votes	%	±%
Liberal	Robert David Roberts*	unopposed		

=== Cynfal and Teigl District (two seats) ===
William Davies, farmer, of Caerblaidd, Ffestiniog and John Hughes, farmer, of Hafodfawrisaf, Maentwrog, were elected at the expense of George Henry Ellis, solicitor, of Penymount, Ffestiniog and Edward Henry Jonathan, draper, of Paris House, Four Crosses.

Dolgelley Combined District 1889
Party	Candidate	Votes	%	±%
Conservative	William Davies	159		
Liberal	John Hughes	105		
Independent	George Henry Ellis	95		
Liberal	Edward Henry Jonathan	89		

=== Cwmorthin and Ystradau (two seats) ===
Cwmorthin and Ystradau 1889
Party	Candidate	Votes	%	±%
Liberal	Alexander Milne Dunlop	unopposed		
Liberal	William Parry Evans	unopposed		

=== Dolgelley Northern ===
Dolgelley Northern 1892
Party	Candidate	Votes	%	±%
Conservative	C.E.J. Owen	160		
Liberal	W. Hughes	98		

=== Dolgelley Southern ===
Dolgelley Southern 1892
Party	Candidate	Votes	%	±%
Liberal	Morris Jones*	145		
Conservative	T.H. Roberts	76		

=== Dolgelley Rural District ===
Dolgelley Rural District 1892
Party	Candidate	Votes	%	±%
Liberal	Robert Pugh	111		
Conservative	Richard Edward Lloyd Richards	95		
Majority		16		

=== Dyffryn ===
Samuel Pope, having been caught in the controversy over use of the Welsh language in 1889, did not seek re-election. John Davies, Glanymorfa, was elected in his place, defeating W. Ansell, Corsygedol.

Dyffryn 1892
Party	Candidate	Votes	%	±%
Liberal	John Davies	106		
Conservative	W. Ansell	82		
Majority		24		

=== Gwyddelwern ===
Gwyddelwern 1892
Party	Candidate	Votes	%	±%
Liberal	Joseph Davies	unopposed		

=== Harlech District ===
The sitting member, Richard Thomas Jones, surgeon, of Penygarth Villa, Harlech defeated F.R. Lloyd of Bronygraig by a much larger margin than his success in 1889.

Harlech District 1892
Party	Candidate	Votes	%	±%
Liberal	Richard Thomas Jones	175		
Conservative	F.R. Lloyd	58		
Majority		117		

=== Llanaber ===
Llanaber 1892
Party	Candidate	Votes	%	±%
Conservative	Charles Williams*	unopposed		

=== Llandrillo ===
Llandrillo 1892
Party	Candidate	Votes	%	±%
Liberal	Henry Davies*	unopposed		

=== Llandderfel ===
Llandderfel 1892
Party	Candidate	Votes	%	±%
Liberal	Thomas Jones	unopposed		

=== Llanegryn ===
Llanegryn 1892
Party	Candidate	Votes	%	±%
Conservative	William Robert Maurice Wynne*	Unopposed		

=== Llanfachreth ===
Llanfachreth 1892
Party	Candidate	Votes	%	±%
Conservative	Robert Vaughan	136		
Liberal	Edward Griffith	91		
Majority		45		

=== Llanfor ===
Richard John Price of Rhiwlas defeated William Thomas Rowlands, farmer, of Tanycoed, Llanfor (L).

Llanaber 1892
Party	Candidate	Votes	%	±%
Conservative	Richard John Price	141		
Liberal	William Thomas Rowlands	64		
Majority		77		

=== Llanfrothen ===
John Jones, gentleman, of Ynysfor, Llanfrothen defeated William Hughes, farmer, of Cwmcaeth, Nantmor, Beddgelert.

Llanaber 1892
Party	Candidate	Votes	%	±%
Conservative	John Jones	142		
Liberal	William Hughes	74		
Majority		68		

=== Llansantffraid ===
Llansantffraid 1892
Party	Candidate	Votes	%	±%
Liberal	Hugh Jones	unopposed		

=== Llanuwchllyn District ===
Llanuwchllyn 1892
Party	Candidate	Votes	%	±%
Liberal	Thomas Jones	unopposed		

=== Llanycil ===
Llanycil 1892
Party	Candidate	Votes	%	±%
Liberal	Roger Hughes*	unopposed		

=== Llwyngwril ===
Llwyngwril 1892
Party	Candidate	Votes	%	±%
Liberal	Evan Hughes	unopposed		

=== Maenofferen and Diphwys Combined District (two seats) ===
John Parry Jones of the District Bank, Blaenau Ffestiniog and Robert Owen Jones, solicitor, of High Street, Blaenau Ffestiniog were elected at the expense of Morris Jones, flour dealer, of Blaenbowydd House, Blaenau Ffestiniog.

Maenofferen and Diphwys Combined District 1892
Party	Candidate	Votes	%	±%
Liberal	John Parry Jones	276		
Liberal	Robert Owen Jones	264		
Independent	Morris Jones	173		

=== Maentwrog ===
William Edward Oakeley of Plas Tanybwlch was elected unopposed.

Maentwrog 1892
Party	Candidate	Votes	%	±%
Conservative	William Edward Oakeley	unopposed		

=== Mawddwy District ===
Mawddwy 1892
Party	Candidate	Votes	%	±%
Liberal	John Jones*	unopposed		

=== Pennal ===
Pennal 1892
Party	Candidate	Votes	%	±%
Liberal	Hugh Jones	unopposed		

=== Penrhyn and Talsarnau (two seats) ===
J. B. Jones, miller, of Brynyfelin and John Rowe, quarry manager, of Glasfryn View, Penrhyn, were elected at the expense of Edmund Morgan Roberts, farmer, of Cefntrefor- isaf, Talsarnau and John Morgan, grocer, of Canton House, High Street, Blaenau Ffestiniog.

Penrhyn and Talsarnau 1892
Party	Candidate	Votes	%	±%
Liberal	J. B. Jones	223		
Liberal	John Rowe	219		
Conservative	Edmund Morgan Roberts	207		
Liberal	John Morgan	72		

=== Rhiw (two seats) ===
Rhiw 1892
Party	Candidate	Votes	%	±%
Liberal	David Griffith Jones*	unopposed		

=== Talyllyn ===
Talyllyn 1892
Party	Candidate	Votes	%	±%
Liberal	John Pugh Jones	unopposed		

=== Teigl ===
Ellis Hughes, a quarryman, was returned unopposed.

Teigl 1892
Party	Candidate	Votes	%	±%
Liberal	Ellis Hughes	unopposed		

=== Towyn Rural District ===
Towyn Rural District 1892
Party	Candidate	Votes	%	±%
Liberal	David Davies	unopposed		

=== Towyn Urban District ===
Towyn Urban District 1892
Party	Candidate	Votes	%	±%
Liberal	Henry Haydn Jones*	Unopposed	N/A	N/A

=== Trawsfynydd Eastern and Western Districts (two seats) ===
John Humphreys, physician and surgeon, of Fronwynion-street, Trawsfynydd and Robert Hugh Pughe, farmer, of Brynllefrith, Trawsfynydd, were elected at the expense of David Tegid Jones, farmer, of Y Goppa and William Evans, draper, of Meirion House, Trawsfynydd.

Trawsfynydd Eastern and Western Districts 1889
Party	Candidate	Votes	%	±%
Liberal	John Humphreys	162		
Independent	Robert Hugh Pughe	109		
Liberal	David Tegid Jones	107		
Liberal	William Evans	81		

== Election of Aldermen ==
In addition to the 42 councillors the council consisted of 14 county aldermen. Aldermen were elected by the council, and served a six-year term. Following the election of the initial sixteen aldermen, half of the aldermanic bench would be elected every three years following the triennial council election. After the initial elections, there were sixteen Aldermanic vacancies and the following Alderman were appointed by the newly elected council:

Only three of those elected were members of the council.

Elected for six years

- S. Pope, Liberal, (elected councillor at )
- A. O. Williams, Liberal
- J. Cadwaltwdr, Liberal
- Edward Griffith, Liberal (defeated candidate at Llanfachreth)
- Richard Jones, Plasyracre, Liberal (elected councillor at Bala)
- Wm. Williams, Liberal
- J. Hughes Jones, Liberal

Elected for three years

- C. H. Wynn, Conservative
- John Evans, Liberal
- E. H. Jonathan, Liberal
- Andreas Roberts. Liberal
- Edward Peters, Liberal (elected councillor at Llanycil)
- Rev G. Ceidiog Roberts, Liberal (defeated candidate at Maentwrog)
- William Davies, Pant, Liberal

== Aldermanic Vacancies 1889-1895 ==
Richard Jones died suddenly in February 1889, creating an immediate vacancy.

Therefore, the following appointment was made for the remaining six years in May 1892.

== By-elections ==
Three by-elections were caused by the election of aldermen.

=== Bala by-election ===
Edward Watkin, land agent, Rhiwlas, standing as an Independent, defeated the Liberal candidate by fifteen votes. Richard Jones, who had been elected alderman, died three days later.

Bala by-election 1889
Party	Candidate	Votes	%	±%
Independent	Edward Watkin	147		
Liberal	Evan Jones	132		
Majority		15		

== Bibliography ==
- Morgan, Kenneth O. (1967). "Cardiganshire Politics: The Liberal Ascendancy 1885-1923". Ceredigion. 5 (4): 311–346.
