= List of elections in 1889 =

The following elections occurred in the year 1889.

- 1889 Christchurch North by-election
- 1889 Costa Rican general election
- 1889 Liberian general election
- 1889 New York state election
- 1889 Newfoundland general election

== Europe ==
- 1889 Dalmatian parliamentary election
- 1889 Faroese general election
- 1889 French legislative election
- 1889 Portuguese legislative election
- 1889 Serbian parliamentary election

=== United Kingdom ===
- 1889 Belfast North by-election
- 1889 Brighton by-election
- 1889 Buckingham by-election
- 1889 Dundee by-election
- 1889 Elginshire and Nairnshire by-election
- 1889 Gorton by-election
- 1889 Govan by-election
- 1889 South East Cork by-election
- 1889 West Carmarthenshire by-election
- 1889 United Kingdom local elections

== See also ==
- Category:1889 elections
