= Merionethshire County =

Merionethshire County may refer to:

- Merionethshire, a historic county of Wales
- Merionethshire County Council, a local authority in Wales from 1889 to 1974
