= 1889 Merionethshire County Council election =

1889 Welsh local government election

The first election to the Merionethshire County Council was held on 18 January 1889. It was followed by the 1892 election. The county was divided into numerous single member wards with two councillors elected to represent some of the urban areas.

== Overview of the result ==
1889 was a landmark year in the history of Welsh Liberalism, a coming of age symbolized by the triumph across Wales of Liberal candidates in the inaugural county council elections. The outcome was very similar to that in Cardiganshire.

== Unopposed returns ==
There were some unopposed returns.

== Contested elections ==
There were a large number of contested elections and the majorities were small in most instances. In most cases there were contests between Liberal and Conservative candidates.

== The new council ==
The first meeting of the council was held in Dolgellau.

== Summary of results ==
This section summarises the detailed results which are noted in the following sections. This was the inaugural county election and therefore no comparison can be made with the previous elections. One councillor was described as an Independent candidate but was also grouped in some reports with the Conservatives.

This table summarises the result of the elections in all wards. 42 councillors were elected.

Merionethshire County Council 1889: elected members
Party	Seats	Gains	Losses	Net gain/loss	Seats %	Votes %	Votes	+/−
Liberal	33							
Conservative	8							
Independent	1							

This table summarises the position following the election of aldermen. Eight were elected from among the elected members and eight from outside the council. This brought the total number of councillors and aldermen to 56.

Merionethshire County Council 1889 : following election of new aldermen
Party	Seats	Gains	Losses	Net gain/loss	Seats %	Votes %	Votes	+/−
Liberal	43	10		+11				
Conservative	9	1		+1				
Independent	1			0				

This table summarises the position following the by-elections for the three seats vacated following the election of aldermen. Technically these were new seats, taking the total number of councillors to 56. However, the Liberals defended three seats.

Merionethshire County Council 1889 : following by-elections
Party	Seats	Gains	Losses	Net gain/loss	Seats %	Votes %	Votes	+/−
Liberal	46	3	0	0				
Conservative	9	0	0	0				
Independent	1							

== Ward results ==
=== Abercorris and Talyllyn (two seats) ===
Abercorris and Talyllyn 1889
Party	Candidate	Votes	%	±%
Liberal	Morris Thomas	226		
Liberal	William Caradog Jones	192		
Conservative	Edward Williams	169		

=== Aberdovey District ===
Aberdovey District 1889
Party	Candidate	Votes	%	±%
Conservative	James Webster	95		
Liberal	John Hughes Jones	89		
Majority		6		

=== Bala District ===
Richard Jones was a prominent figure in the public life of Bala, serving on many bodies. He was elected alderman at the first meeting of the Council but died suddenly in February, aged 65.

Bala District 1889
Party	Candidate	Votes	%	±%
Liberal	Richard Jones	Unopposed	N/A	N/A

=== Barmouth Urban District ===
Lewis Lewis, gentleman, of Hillside, Barmouth, defeated John Robert Davies, gentleman, of Compton House, Barmouth.

Barmouth Urban District 1889
Party	Candidate	Votes	%	±%
Liberal	Lewis Lewis	160		
Conservative	John Robert Davies	109		
Majority		51		

=== Conglywal District ===
Robert Roberts, physician and surgeon, of Isallt, Blaenau Festiniog defeated Joseph Rhydwen Parry, Independent minister, of Manod Road, Blaenau Ffestiniog.

Conglywal District 1889
Party	Candidate	Votes	%	±%
Liberal	Robert Roberts	163		
Liberal	Joseph Rhydwen Parry	129		
Majority		34		

=== Cynfal and Teigl District (two seats) ===
William Davies, farmer, of Caerblaidd, Ffestiniog and John Hughes, farmer, of Hafodfawrisaf, Maentwrog, were elected at the expense of George Henry Ellis, solicitor, of Penymount, Ffestiniog and Edward Henry Jonathan, draper, of Paris House, Four Crosses.

Dolgelley Combined District 1889
Party	Candidate	Votes	%	±%
Conservative	William Davies	159		
Liberal	John Hughes	105		
Independent	George Henry Ellis	95		
Liberal	Edward Henry Jonathan	89		

=== Cwmorthin and Ystradau (two seats) ===
Cwmorthin and Ystradau 1889
Party	Candidate	Votes	%	±%
Liberal	Alexander Milne Dunlop	Unopposed	N/A	N/A
Liberal	William Parry Evans	Unopposed	N/A	N/A

=== Dolgelley Combined District (two seats) ===
Dolgelley Combined District 1889
Party	Candidate	Votes	%	±%
Liberal	Edward Jones	300		
Liberal	Morris Jones	261		
Conservative	John Vaughan	218		

=== Dolgelley Rural District ===
Dolgelley Rural District 1889
Party	Candidate	Votes	%	±%
Liberal	Robert Pugh	111		
Conservative	Richard Edward Lloyd Richards	95		
Majority		16		

=== Dyffryn ===
Dyffryn 1889
Party	Candidate	Votes	%	±%
Liberal	Samuel Pope	Unopposed	N/A	N/A

=== Gwyddelwern ===
Gwyddelwern 1889
Party	Candidate	Votes	%	±%
Liberal	Robert Edwards	Unopposed	N/A	N/A

=== Harlech District ===
Richard Thomas Jones, surgeon, of Penygarth Villa, Harlech defeated John Owen, farmer, of Brynartro, Llanfair.

Harlech District 1889
Party	Candidate	Votes	%	±%
Liberal	Richard Thomas Jones	152		
Conservative	John Owen	141		
Majority		11		

=== Llanaber ===
Charles Williams of Hengwm, Llanaber defeated John Jones, farmer, of Llwyndu, Barmouth.

Llanaber 1889
Party	Candidate	Votes	%	±%
Conservative	Charles Williams	50		
Liberal	John Jones	28		
Majority		22		

=== Llandrillo ===
Llandrillo 1889
Party	Candidate	Votes	%	±%
Liberal	Henry Davies	Unopposed	N/A	N/A

=== Llandderfel ===
Llandderfel 1889
Party	Candidate	Votes	%	±%
Liberal	Thomas Jones	Unopposed	N/A	N/A

=== Llanegryn ===
Llanegryn 1889
Party	Candidate	Votes	%	±%
Conservative	William Robert Maurice Wynne	151		
Liberal	John Evans	104		
Majority		48		

=== Llanfachreth ===
Llanfachreth 1889
Party	Candidate	Votes	%	±%
Conservative	Robert Vaughan	136		
Liberal	Edward Griffith	91		
Majority		45		

=== Llanfor ===
Richard John Price of Rhiwlas defeated William Thomas Rowlands, farmer, of Tanycoed, Llanfor (L).

Llanaber 1889
Party	Candidate	Votes	%	±%
Conservative	Richard John Price	141		
Liberal	William Thomas Rowlands	64		
Majority		77		

=== Llanfrothen ===
John Jones, gentleman, of Ynysfor, Llanfrothen defeated William Hughes, farmer, of Cwmcaeth, Nantmor, Beddgelert.

Llanaber 1889
Party	Candidate	Votes	%	±%
Conservative	John Jones	142		
Liberal	William Hughes	74		
Majority		68		

=== Llansantffraid and Corwen Combined Districts (three seats) ===
William Ffoulkes Jones, timber merchant, of the Terrace, Corwen; Robert David Roberts, wholesale grocer, of Glandwr, Corwen, and Hugh Cernyw Williams, Baptist minister, of London Road, Corwen were elected at the expense of David Robert Jones, surgeon, of the Terrace, Bridge Street, Corwen and Horatio Edward Walker, surgeon, of Plasyndref, Corwen.

Llansantffraid and Corwen Combined Districts 1889
Party	Candidate	Votes	%	±%
Liberal	William Ffoulkes Jones	341		
Liberal	Robert David Roberts	332		
Liberal	Rev Hugh Cernyw Williams	277		
Conservative	David Robert Jones	252		
Conservative	Horatio Edward Walker	162		

=== Llanuwchllyn District ===
Llanuwchllyn 1889
Party	Candidate	Votes	%	±%
Liberal	Michael Daniel Jones	125		
Conservative	John Williams	117		
Majority		8		

=== Llanycil ===
Llanycil 1889
Party	Candidate	Votes	%	±%
Liberal	Edward Peters	Unopposed	N/A	N/A

=== Llwyngwril ===
Llwyngwril 1889
Party	Candidate	Votes	%	±%
Liberal	Ellis Pughe-Jones	Unopposed	N/A	N/A

=== Maenofferen and Diphwys Combined District (two seats) ===
John Parry Jones of the District Bank, Blaenau Ffestiniog and Robert Owen Jones, solicitor, of High Street, Blaenau Ffestiniog were elected at the expense of Morris Jones, flour dealer, of Blaenbowydd House, Blaenau Ffestiniog.

Maenofferen and Diphwys Combined District 1889
Party	Candidate	Votes	%	±%
Liberal	John Parry Jones	276		
Liberal	Robert Owen Jones	264		
Independent	Morris Jones	173		

=== Maentwrog ===
William Edward Oakeley of Plas Tanybwlch defeated Griffith Ceidiog Roberts, nonconformist minister of Gwyndy, Maentwrog. In what was described as the first Liberal meeting held at Maentwrog, in support of Roberts's candidature, Tom Ellis MP spoke for over an hour and a half.

Maentwrog 1889
Party	Candidate	Votes	%	±%
Conservative	William Edward Oakeley	134		
Liberal	Griffith Ceidiog Roberts	83		
Majority		51		

=== Mawddwy District ===
Mawddwy 1889
Party	Candidate	Votes	%	±%
Liberal	John Jones	141		
Conservative	Henry Owen	105		
Majority		36		

=== Pennal ===
Pennal 1889
Party	Candidate	Votes	%	±%
Liberal	James Meredith	Unopposed	N/A	N/A

=== Penrhyn and Talsarnau (two seats) ===
J. B. Jones, miller, of Brynyfelin and John Rowe, quarry manager, of Glasfryn View, Penrhyn, were elected at the expense of Edmund Morgan Roberts, farmer, of Cefntrefor- isaf, Talsarnau and John Morgan, grocer, of Canton House, High Street, Blaenau Ffestiniog.

Penrhyn and Talsarnau 1889
Party	Candidate	Votes	%	±%
Liberal	J. B. Jones	223		
Liberal	John Rowe	219		
Conservative	Edmund Morgan Roberts	207		
Liberal	John Morgan	72		

=== Rhiw and Bowydd (two seats) ===
Rhiw and Bowydd 1889
Party	Candidate	Votes	%	±%
Liberal	David Griffith Williams	Unopposed	N/A	N/A
Liberal	David Griffith Jones	Unopposed	N/A	N/A

=== Towyn Rural District ===
Towyn Rural District 1889
Party	Candidate	Votes	%	±%
Liberal	Rev Griffith Evans	Unopposed	N/A	N/A

=== Towyn Urban District ===
Towyn Urban District 1889
Party	Candidate	Votes	%	±%
Liberal	Henry Haydn Jones	Unopposed	N/A	N/A

=== Trawsfynydd Eastern and Western Districts (two seats) ===
John Humphreys, physician and surgeon, of Fronwynion-street, Trawsfynydd and Robert Hugh Pughe, farmer, of Brynllefrith, Trawsfynydd, were elected at the expense of David Tegid Jones, farmer, of Y Goppa and William Evans, draper, of Meirion House, Trawsfynydd.

Trawsfynydd Eastern and Western Districts 1889
Party	Candidate	Votes	%	±%
Liberal	John Humphreys	162		
Independent	Robert Hugh Pughe	109		
Liberal	David Tegid Jones	107		
Liberal	William Evans	81		

== Election of Aldermen ==
In addition to the 42 councillors the council consisted of 14 county aldermen. Aldermen were elected by the council, and served a six-year term. Following the election of the initial sixteen aldermen, half of the aldermanic bench would be elected every three years following the triennial council election. After the initial elections, there were sixteen Aldermanic vacancies and the following Alderman were appointed by the newly elected council:

Only three of those elected were members of the council.

Elected for six years

- S. Pope, Liberal, (elected councillor at )
- A. O. Williams, Liberal
- J. Cadwaltwdr, Liberal
- Edward Griffith, Liberal (defeated candidate at Llanfachreth)
- Richard Jones, Plasyracre, Liberal (elected councillor at Bala)
- Wm. Williams, Liberal
- J. Hughes Jones, Liberal

Elected for three years

- C. H. Wynn, Conservative
- John Evans, Liberal
- E. H. Jonathan, Liberal
- Andreas Roberts. Liberal
- Edward Peters, Liberal (elected councillor at Llanycil)
- Rev G. Ceidiog Roberts, Liberal (defeated candidate at Maentwrog)
- William Davies, Pant, Liberal

== Aldermanic Vacancies 1889-1895 ==
Richard Jones died suddenly in February 1889, creating an immediate vacancy.

Therefore, the following appointment was made for the remaining six years in May 1892.

== By-elections ==
Three by-elections were caused by the election of aldermen.

=== Bala by-election ===
Edward Watkin, land agent, Rhiwlas, standing as an Independent, defeated the Liberal candidate by fifteen votes. Richard Jones, who had been elected alderman, died three days later.

Bala by-election 1889
Party	Candidate	Votes	%	±%
Independent	Edward Watkin	147		
Liberal	Evan Jones	132		
Majority		15		

== Bibliography ==
- Morgan, Kenneth O. (1967). "Cardiganshire Politics: The Liberal Ascendancy 1885-1923". Ceredigion. 5 (4): 311–346.
