= John Burke (genealogist) =

Irish genealogist (1786–1848)

- Seaán de Búrca
- Born: 12 November 1786; County Tipperary
- Died: 27 March 1848 (aged 61); Aachen
- Spouse: Mary O' Reilly
- Children: Bernard Burke; Peter Burke
- Parents: Peter Burke; Anne Dowdall

John Burke (12 November 1786 – 27 March 1848) (Note: There is a discrepancy in the date of birth between the website for Burke's Peerage and the "John Burke" listing in the Dictionary of National Biography from 1886. The former has 12 November 1786, and the latter has 1787. The former is believed to be correct.) was an Irish genealogist, and the original publisher of Burke's Peerage. He was the father of Sir Bernard Burke, a British officer of arms and genealogist.

== Origins ==
He was the elder son of Peter Burke of Elm Hall, County Tipperary, by his first wife, Anne, daughter and coheiress of Matthew Dowdall, M.D., of Mullingar. In accordance with a family arrangement, his younger brother Joseph succeeded to the estate at the father's death on 13 January 1836. The Burke family were descendants of the Earl of Clanricarde via Dominick Burke (born 1664), of Clondagoff Castle, County Galway. Later generations have lived at Auberies, Bulmer, Essex.

== Career ==
John Burke early engaged in literary work in London, but afterwards devoted himself to genealogical studies, and in 1826 he issued a Genealogical and Heraldic Dictionary of the Peerage and Baronetage of the United Kingdom. For the first time such a work was arranged alphabetically, as opposed to in the Ahnentafel or genealogical-table style, and peers and baronets were treated together. The convenience of its method at once gave it great popularity. The Peerage was republished at irregular intervals until 1847, when it reached its ninth edition. From that date it has been issued annually. A General and Heraldic Dictionary of the Peerages of England, Ireland, and Scotland, extinct, dormant, and in abeyance, was first published by Burke in 1831 (3rd edit. 1846); later editions, prepared by Sir J. B. Burke, appealed in 1866 and 1883.

In 1831 Burke also issued what was intended to be the first of a series of annual handbooks, entitled The Official Calendar for 1831, but the series was not continued. Between 1833 and 1838, he published A Genealogical and Heraldic History of the Commoners of Great Britain and Ireland, in four volumes; another edition was issued in 1838; and a third edition in two volumes between 1843 and 1849. The title was altered in the later editions to A Dictionary of the Landed Gentry and a supplementary volume appeared in 1844, containing corrigenda and a general index. It is known colloquially as Burke's Landed Gentry.

Burke was also the author of:

- The Portrait Gallery of Distinguished Females, including Beauties of the Courts of George IV and William IV, 2 vols. 1833
- A Genealogical and Heraldic History of the Extinct and Dormant Baronetcies of England; 1838 (re-issued 1841 and 1844)
- The Knightage of Great Britain and Ireland, 1841
- A General Armory of England, Scotland, and Ireland, 1842 (republished in Bohn's series in 1844 as Burke's Encyclopedia of Heraldry, and by Sir J. B. Burke in an enlarged form in 1878)
- Heraldic Illustrations, comprising the Armorial Bearings of all the Principal Families of the Empire, with Pedigrees and Annotations, 1844 (an illuminated supplement appeared in 1851)
- The Royal Families of England, Scotland, and Wales, and the Families descended from them, in 5 vols. 1847–51.

Burke was also the editor of a short-lived periodical, The Patrician.

== Marriage and progeny ==
He married his cousin Mary O'Reilly (died 1846), second daughter of Bernard O'Reilly of Ballymorris, County Longford, Ireland. Mary is listed as one of the lost graves on the Burdett-Coutts memorial in Old St. Pancras Churchyard. By his wife he had two sons:

- Peter Burke, a barrister
- Sir Bernard Burke, genealogist and officer of arms

== Death ==
Burke died at Aachen (formerly known as Aix-la-Chapelle) in Germany on 27 March 1848.

== List of works ==
=== History of the Commoners ===
A Genealogical and Heraldic History of the Commoners of Great Britain and Ireland Enjoying Territorial Possessions or High Official Rank but Uninvested with Heritable Honours, 4 volumes (1833–1838) (subsequently published as Burke's Landed Gentry):

- Vol.1, London, 1836 (archive.org)
- Vol.2, London, 1835
  - Vol.2, ("Small Paper Edition"), London, 1837
- Vol.3, London, 1836 (google books); Vol.3, London, 1836 (archive.org)
- Vol.4
  - Vol. 4, ("Small Paper Edition"), London, 1838

=== History of Extinct Baronetcies ===
A Genealogical and Heraldic History of the Extinct and Dormant Baronetcies of England, Ireland and Scotland, by John Burke and John Bernard Burke,

- 1st Edition, 1838
- 2nd Edition, London, 1841
- 3rd Edition, 1844

== See also ==
- House of Burgh, an Anglo-Norman and Hiberno-Norman dynasty founded in 1193
- Earl of Clanricarde
- Clanricarde
