= Graham Stoker =

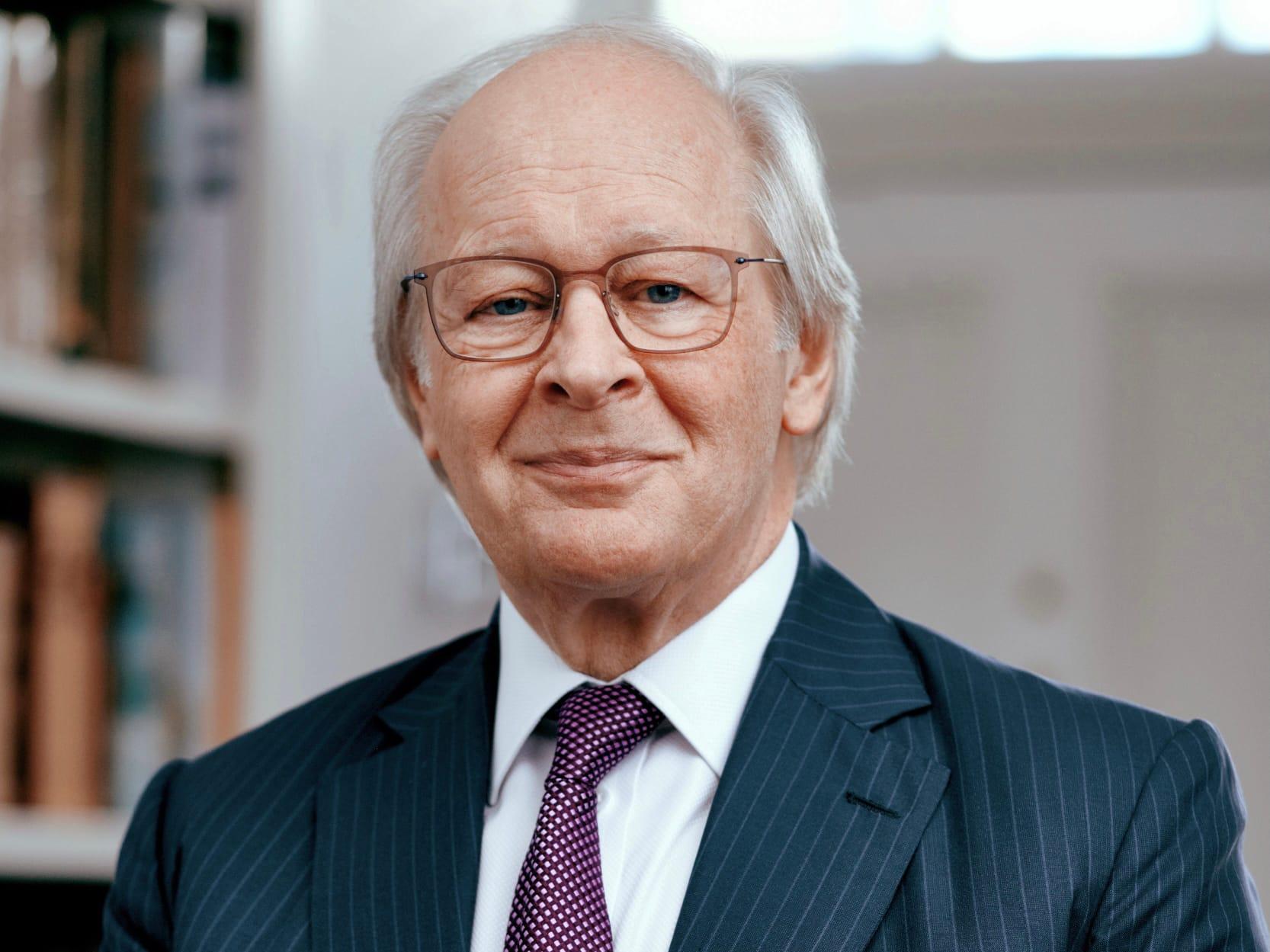

Graham Stoker is a British sports barrister and motor sport executive. From 2009 to 2021, he served as the Deputy President for Sport of the Fédération Internationale de l'Automobile (FIA). He was a member of FIA World Motor Sport Council and honorary council member of the Motor Sports Association (UK). Stoker has been involved in motor sport since graduating as a driver from the Ian Taylor Racing School and the Elf Winfield Racing School in France. He joined UK motor sport's governing body Royal Automobile Club Motor Sports Association (now Motorsport UK) in 1985, going on to become the first Chairman of the Permanent Stewards to the British Touring Car Championship from 1995 to 2001.

He became joint President of the Motor Sports Association in 2001 when he was elected Chairman of the Motor Sports Council and ex officio Member of the Board. He joined the FIA that year when he was elected to the International Court of Appeal, and in 2004 in Rome he was elected to the FIA World Motor Sport Council as the Titular Member for the United Kingdom.

As FIA Deputy President his role was to lead the sport pillar of the FIA, developing motor sport worldwide and using it as a global platform to promote social responsibility and international development.

He was also a member of the Senate, joint chair of the Innovation Fund, and chair of the Sport Funding Commission, chair of the International Sporting Code Working Group, joint chair of the Statute Review Commission, and an Honoree Trustee of the FIA Foundation. He was a member of the FIA Environment and Sustainability Commission and has awarded environmental accreditation to numerous stake holders. He will represent FIA at the upcoming Cop 26 UN Conference.

He represented FIA at the GAISF, the IOC recognized association of Global Sport Federations based in Lausanne. He works closely with the other "power sport" federations FIM, UIM, and FAI and he represented FIA Sport at the EU Sport Congress, and other international meetings.

Stoker remains an Honorary Member of the UK Motorsport Council, as well as an Honorary Member of the British Automobile and Racing Club and a Patron of the F1 in Schools charity.

Stoker is a recognized expert in Sports Law and long-standing member of the UK Sports Dispute Resolutions Panel. He has settled numerous disputes in a wide range of sports including selection for 'Team England' at the Commonwealth Games. He is experienced in anti-doping having been President of the FIA Anti-Doping Commission, and is an expert on international sport governance.

He is a long-standing member of the founder member Royal Automobile Club and a former member of the Policy Committee of the RAC Foundation. A member of the UK Environmental Bar, he has extensive experience of transportation and environmental policy having appeared at numerous public inquiries in the UK, and the House of Commons, and is a Member of the Parliamentary Bar Mess.

Stoker was educated at the London School of Economics and the London Institute of Advanced Legal Studies. Called to the English Bar, he is a Winston Churchill Prize holder, a Member of the Middle Temple and Lincoln's Inn, and a leading Barrister in the areas of Sport and International Law.
