= County Hall, Nottinghamshire =

County building in West Bridgford, Nottinghamshire, England

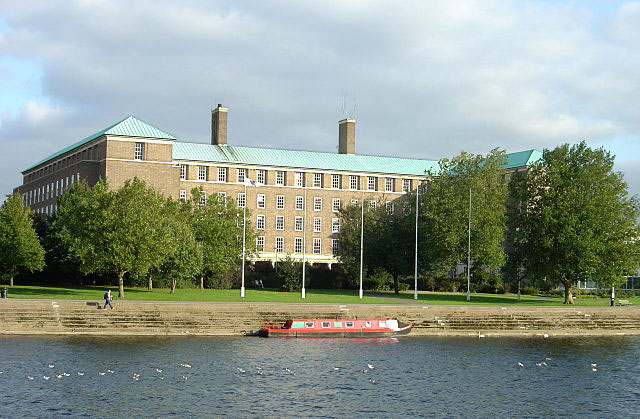
- County Hall

- Location within Nottinghamshire

General information
- Location: West Bridgford, Nottinghamshire, United Kingdom
- Coordinates: 52.9364°N 1.1358°W
- Completed: 1954

Design and construction
- Architect: Vincent Harris

Nottinghamshire County Hall is a large municipal building located at Loughborough Road on the south bank of the River Trent at West Bridgford in Rushcliffe, Nottinghamshire, England. It is the headquarters of Nottinghamshire County Council which is the upper tier local authority and has jurisdiction across the whole of Nottinghamshire except the City of Nottingham which is administered independently by the unitary authority of Nottingham City Council. The county council's new-build headquarters near Hucknall, set to replace County Hall, held the first full meeting of councillors in March 2025.

== History ==
During much of the 20th century the county council was based at the old Shire Hall in the Lace Market in central Nottingham. After deciding that the existing premises were inadequate for their needs, county leaders decided to procure a new building: the site they selected had been occupied by the Castle Cricket Ground.

The foundation stone for the new building was laid by the Lord Lieutenant of Nottinghamshire, William Cavendish-Bentinck, 7th Duke of Portland, on 21 November 1939. It was designed by Vincent Harris (who is also credited with designing Leeds Civic Hall, Bristol City Hall and Sheffield City Hall) but, because of a pause to construction during the Second World War, it was only completed in 1954. The original plans included the construction of a landmark bell tower which would have been three times as tall as the main building. When construction resumed after the war this part of the plan was mothballed to reduce overall costs.

When construction began the site was within the boundaries of the city and county borough of Nottingham. Boundary changes in April 1952 adjusted Nottingham's southern boundary in this area to follow the centre of the River Trent, transferring the County Hall site and other areas on the south bank of the Trent (including the nearby City Ground stadium of Nottingham Forest F.C.) to the neighbouring urban district of West Bridgford.

Queen Elizabeth II, accompanied by the Duke of Edinburgh, visited County Hall on 28 July 1977.

In 2016, county leaders decided that a 1960s concrete prefabricated extension, which had been built as part of the Consortium of Local Authorities Special Programme (CLASP), was deemed surplus to requirements and unfit for purpose. The building was subsequently demolished. In March 2019, it was announced that a new landmark building could be built on the site of the former CLASP building site as part of Nottinghamshire County Council's aspiration to rationalise its countywide estate portfolio.

In 2023 the county council decided that the building was too large and costly to maintain, and it decided to move to a new building. A site was found on the A611 Annesley Road north of Hucknall, in the parish of Linby, and construction began in December 2023 with the new building part-opened in 2025.

Decisions have yet to be made about what will happen to County Hall once the council leaves.

== Architecture ==
The County Hall has a base made of Portland stone and a roof made of copper. Exposure to precipitation has resulted in the copper roof turning green in colour. The design involves a main frontage facing with fifteen bays facing Loughborough Road; the central bay features a stone porch with Doric order columns. The two main entrances around the front and back of the building are flanked by statues of miners depicting the county's mining history. The statues were designed by Robert Kiddey, a local Nottingham artist during the building's construction.

== Art ==
The County Hall houses an extensive collection of artifacts, many of which have been gifted to Nottinghamshire by various visiting dignitaries from around the world and are displayed around the hall. The grand staircase which links the ground and first floors of the building, includes oil paintings depicting historic distinguished members and officers of the county council amongst local scenes. The collection included portraits by the local artist, Arthur Spooner, of Lord Belper and Viscount Galway, who served respectively as the first and second chairmen of the county council. It also includes a landscape painting by David Payne depicting Newstead Abbey.
