= Peter Burke (barrister) =

English barrister and writer (1811–1881)

Peter Burke QC
- Born: 7 May 1811; London
- Died: 26 March 1881 (aged 69); South Kensington
- Education: College of Caen; Inner Temple
- Parents: John Burke; Mary O'Reilly
- Relatives: Sir Bernard Burke (brother)

Peter Burke QC (7 May 1811 – 26 March 1881) was an English barrister and serjeant-at-law, known also as a writer.

== Life ==
He was the eldest son of John Burke of Elm Hall, County Tipperary, and brother of Sir John Bernard Burke, born in London on 7 May 1811. He was educated at the college of Caen, Normandy. Having been called to the bar at the Inner Temple in 1839, he joined the northern circuit and the Manchester and Lancashire sessions.

Burke later practised at the parliamentary bar, and appeared before the House of Lords in several major peerage cases. He was made a Queen's Counsel of the county palatine of Lancaster in 1858, and a serjeant-at-law in 1859. He was elected director or chief honorary officer of the Society of Antiquaries of Normandy for 1866-7.

Burke died at his residence in South Kensington, on 26 March 1881.

== Works ==
With some legal works, Burke published:

- The Wisdom and Genius of Edmund Burke illustrated in a series of extracts from his writing, with a summary of his life, 1845.
- Celebrated Trials connected with the Aristocracy, in the relations of private life, London 1849, 1851.
- The Romance of the Forum, or Narratives, Scenes, and Anecdotes from Courts of Justice, 4 vols. London 1852, 1861.
- The Public and Domestic Life of the Right Hon. Edmund Burke, London 1853.
- Celebrated Naval and Military Trials, London 1866.

== Arms ==
Coat of arms of Peter Burke
Notes Confirmed 13 March 1855 by Sir John Bernard Burke, Ulster King of Arms. Crest A cat-a-mountain sejant guardant Proper collared and chained Or charged in the breast with a cross Gold. Escutcheon Or a cross Gules in the first and fourth quarters a lion rampant Sable. Motto One King One Faith One Law

== See also ==
- House of Burgh, an Anglo-Norman and Hiberno-Norman dynasty founded in 1193
- Earl of Clanricarde
- Clanricarde
