= Samuel Hawksley Burbury =

British mathematician (1831–1911)

Samuel Hawksley Burbury, FRS (18 May 1831 – 18 August 1911) was a British mathematician.

== Life ==
He was born on 18 May 1831 at Kenilworth, the only son of Samuel Burbury of Clarendon Square, Leamington, by Helen his wife.

He was educated at Shrewsbury School (1848–1850), where he was head boy, and at St. John's College, Cambridge. At the university he won exceptional distinction in both classics and mathematics. He was twice Person prizeman (1852 and 1853), Craven university scholar (1853), and chancellor's classical medallist (1854). He graduated B.A. as fifteenth wrangler and second classic in 1854, becoming fellow of his college in the same year; he proceeded M.A. in 1857.

On 6 Oct. 1855 he entered as a student at Lincoln's Inn, and was called to the bar on 7 June 1858. From 1860 he practised at the parliamentary bar; but increasing deafness compelled him to take chamber practice only, from which he retired in 1908. He was elected F.R.S. on 5 June 1890. He died on 18 August 1911 at his residence, 15 Melbury Road, London, W., and was buried at Kensal Green.

== Contributions ==
While engaged in legal work Burbury pursued with much success advanced mathematical study, chiefly in collaboration with his Cambridge friend, Henry William Watson. Together they wrote the treatises, The Application of Generalised Co-ordinates to the Kinetics of a Material System (Oxford, 1879) and The Mathematical Theory of Electricity and Magnetism (2 vols. Oxford, 1885—9), in which the endeavour was made to carry on the researches of Clerk Maxwell and to place electrostatics and electromagnetism on a more formal mathematical basis.

Among many papers which Burbury contributed independently to the 'Philosophical Magazine' were those 'On the Second Law of Thermodynamics, in Connection with the Kinetic Theory of Gases' (1876) and 'On a Theorem in the Dissipation of Energy' (1882).

== Family ==
Burbury married on 12 April 1860 Alice Ann, eldest daughter of Thomas Edward Taylor, J.P., of Dodworth Hall, Barnsley, Yorkshire, and had issue four sons and two daughters. One daughter, Alice married Admiral of the Fleet Henry Jackson in 1890.

A portrait of Burbury by William E. Miller (1884) is in the possession of his widow."
