= Parliamentary bar =

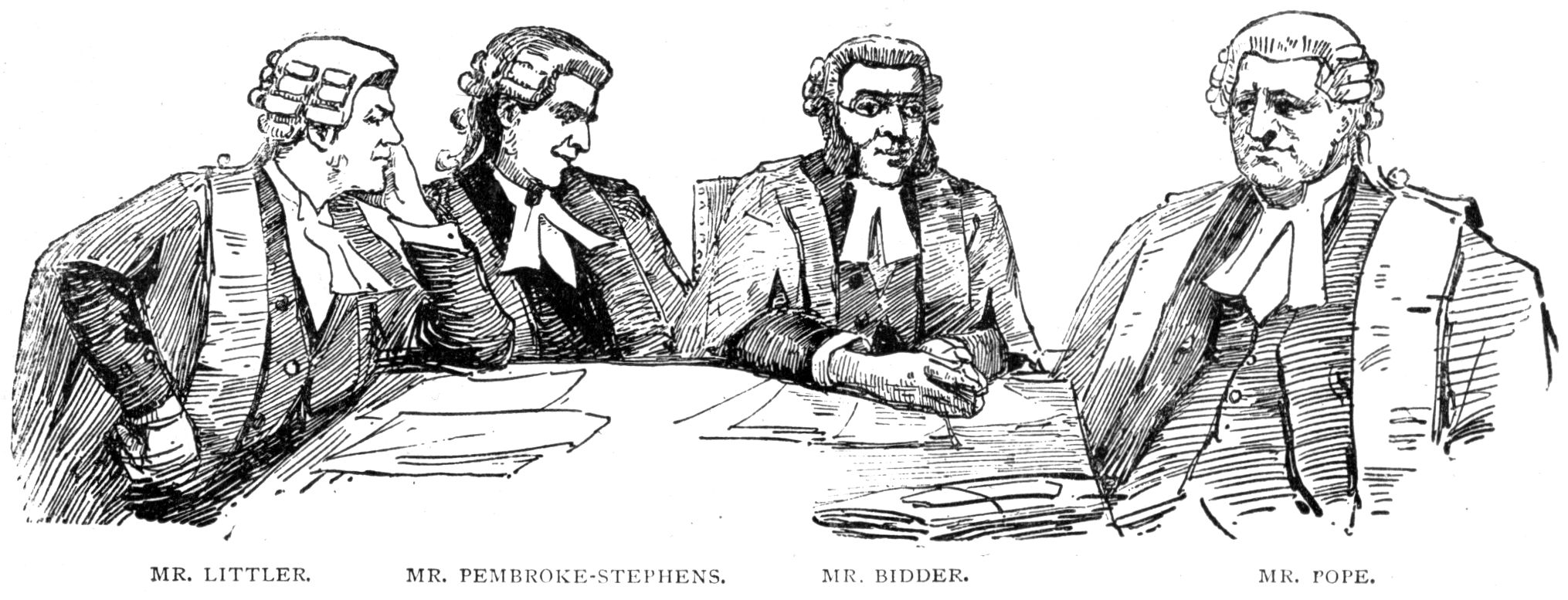
Leaders of the parliamentary, 1891

In the United Kingdom, the parliamentary bar refers to the subset of barristers who appear at the committee stage of private and hybrid bills which are before Parliament.

The parliamentary bar was especially prominent in the 19th century during the 'railway mania' and the 'age of equipment', when numerous infrastructure projects were being promoted via private bills. Leading members of the parliamentary bar during the period earned immense incomes: Charles Austin made 40,000 guineas in a single year and refused appointment as solicitor-general in view of his income. By the beginning of the 20th century, part of the parliamentary bar was turning into the planning bar, though a distinct parliamentary bar remained in existence.

Today, members of the parliamentary bar are often members of the Parliamentary Bar Mess, a voluntary association of barristers who practice at the parliamentary bar. As of February 2021, there were 41 members (excluding honorary members) in nine sets of chambers.

== Notable members ==
- Charles Austin
- Arthur A. Baumann
- Edmund Beckett, 1st Baron Grimthorpe
- Eric Blain
- Samuel Hawksley Burbury
- Peter Burke
- Evan Charteris
- Frederick Clifford
- James Greig
- Alexander Staveley Hill
- James Hope-Scott
- Ernest Law
- Ralph Littler
- William Thackeray Marriott
- Sydney Cope Morgan
- E. H. Pember
- Samuel Pope
- John Abel Ram
- Enoch Salisbury
- George Drewry Squibb
- Graham Stoker
- Alexander Martin Sullivan
- George Talbot
- Harold Infield Willis
- Digby Cayley Wrangham
- Frederic Wrottesley
