= Consortium of Local Authorities Special Programme =

Prefabricated school buildings association

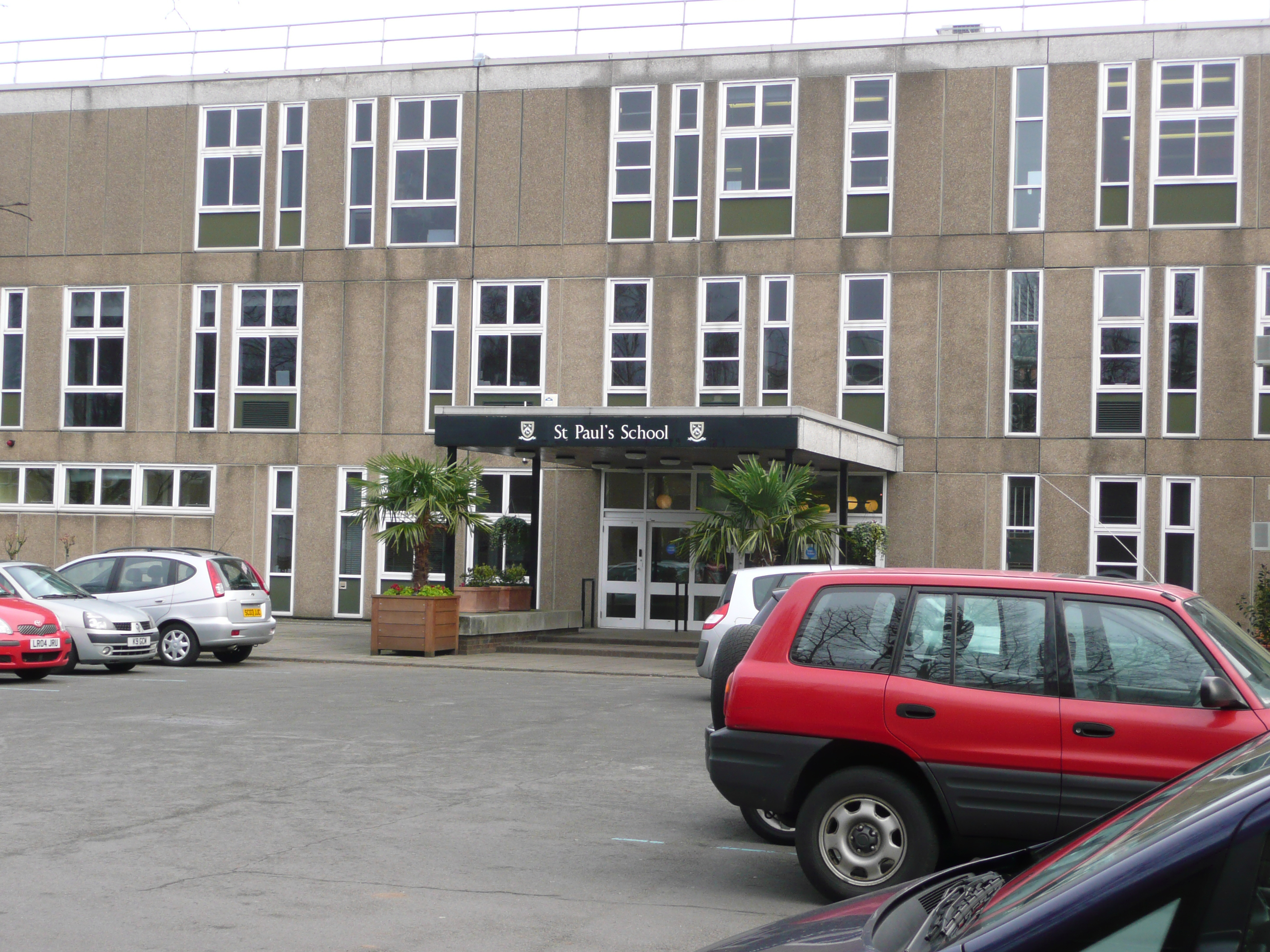
Former CLASP buildings at St Paul's School, London

The Consortium of Local Authorities Special Programme (CLASP), was formed in 1957 by Local Authorities in England to develop a shared prefabricated system for the construction of school buildings. The resulting CLASP building system was initially developed by Charles Herbert Aslin, the county architect for Hertfordshire.

The system was used as a model for several other counties, most notably Nottinghamshire and Derbyshire. CLASP's popularity in these coal mining areas was in part because the system permitted fairly straightforward replacement of subsidence-damaged sections of building. The system was also later used for the construction of railway stations, offices, university buildings, and churches until the late 1970s.

Today, 3,000 examples are still in use. While some of the buildings are listed, there are calls to replace others due to health concerns about asbestos used in their construction.

== Characteristics ==
The system utilised prefabricated light gauge steel frames which could be built economically up to a maximum of four storeys. The frames were finished in a variety of claddings and their modular nature could be employed to produce architecturally satisfying buildings. Initially developed solely for schools, the system was also used to provide offices and housing.

A later development was known as SCOLA (Second Consortium of Local Authorities) and MACE (Metropolitan Architectural Consortium for Education).

The cynics' definition of the CLASP acronym, circulating in the 1970s, was "collection of loosely assembled steel parts". CLASP buildings fell out of favour in the late 1970s. Budgetary advances and changing architectural tastes made the scheme obsolete.

== Examples of use ==
Important examples include many Hertfordshire schools, some of which have since been listed. The system was also used in the construction of the independent St Paul's School, London, designed by Philip Powell and Hidalgo Moya, which was constructed on unstable ground on a former reservoir, and completed in 1968.

In addition to schools, the CLASP system was also used in the 1960s for the buildings of the University of York, designed by architect Andrew Derbyshire between 1961 and 1963. An unusual, perhaps unique use of the system is the Catholic church of St Michael and All Angels in Wombwell, South Yorkshire. Wombwell is prone to mining subsidence and the first church on the site was condemned only ten years after it was built. The replacement church, which was designed by David and Patricia Brown of Weightman & Bullen, opened in 1968, is on a hexagonal plan and clad in concrete panels; the windows are polyester resin instead of stained glass.

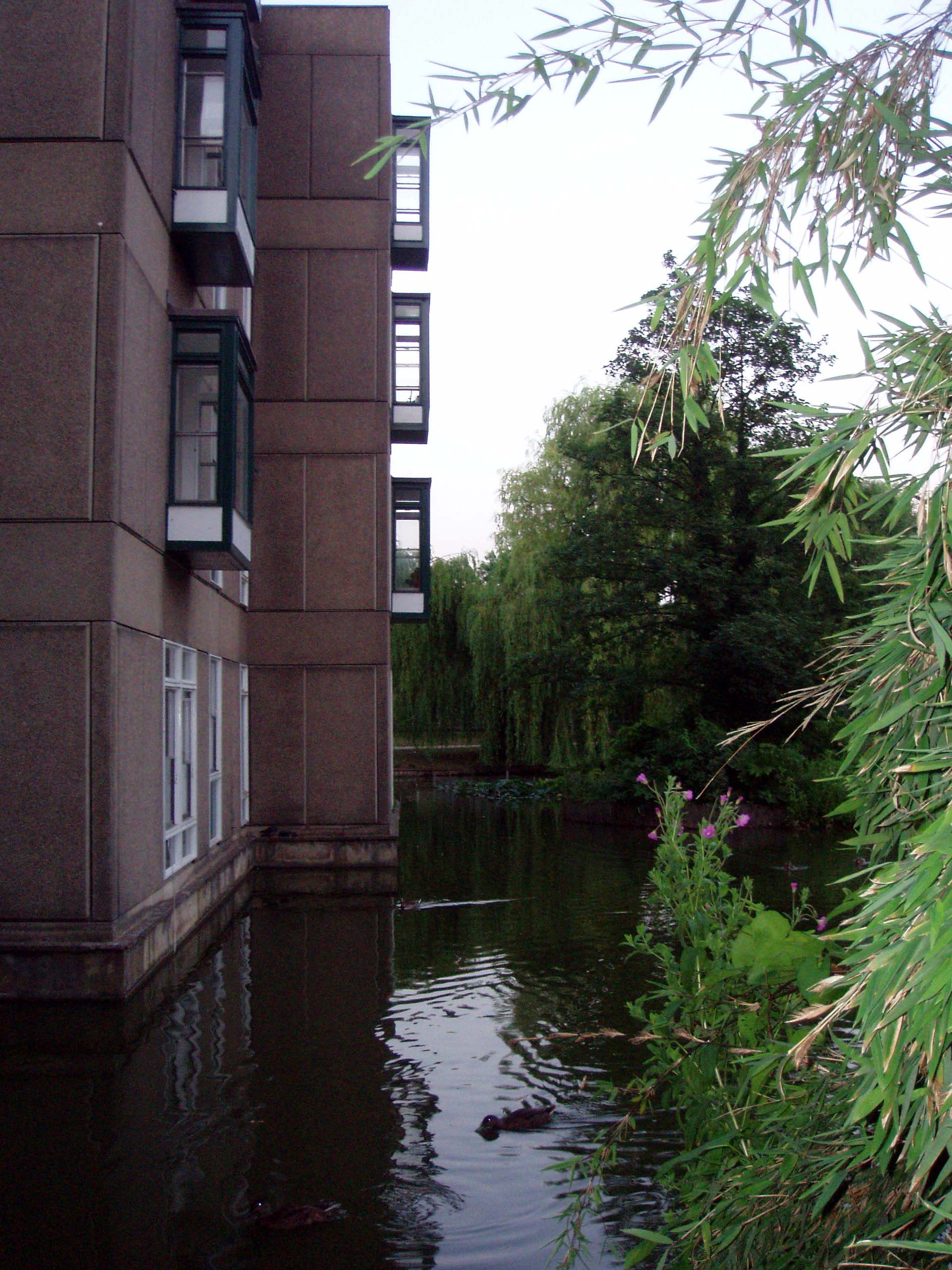
Derwent College, University of York

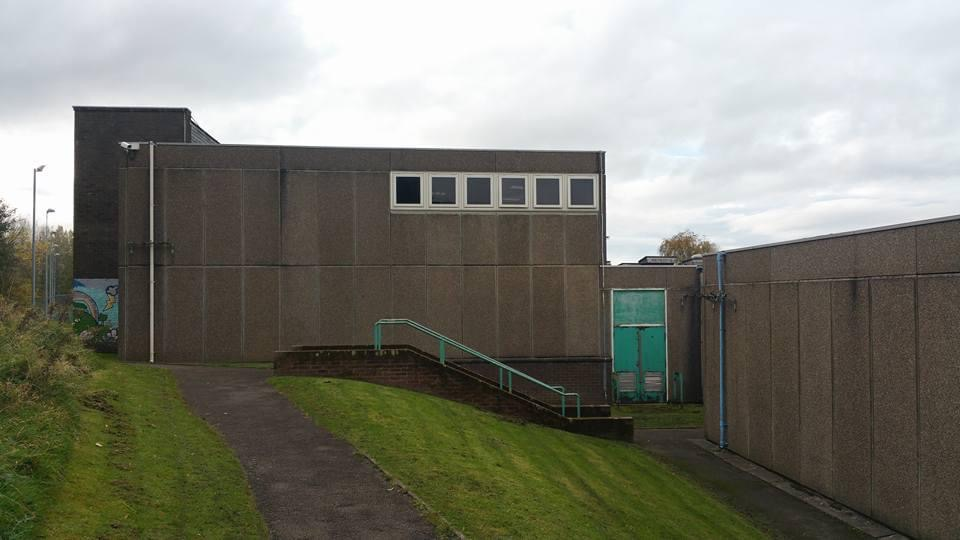
Glossopdale Community College - Hadfield, Derbyshire, demolished 2018

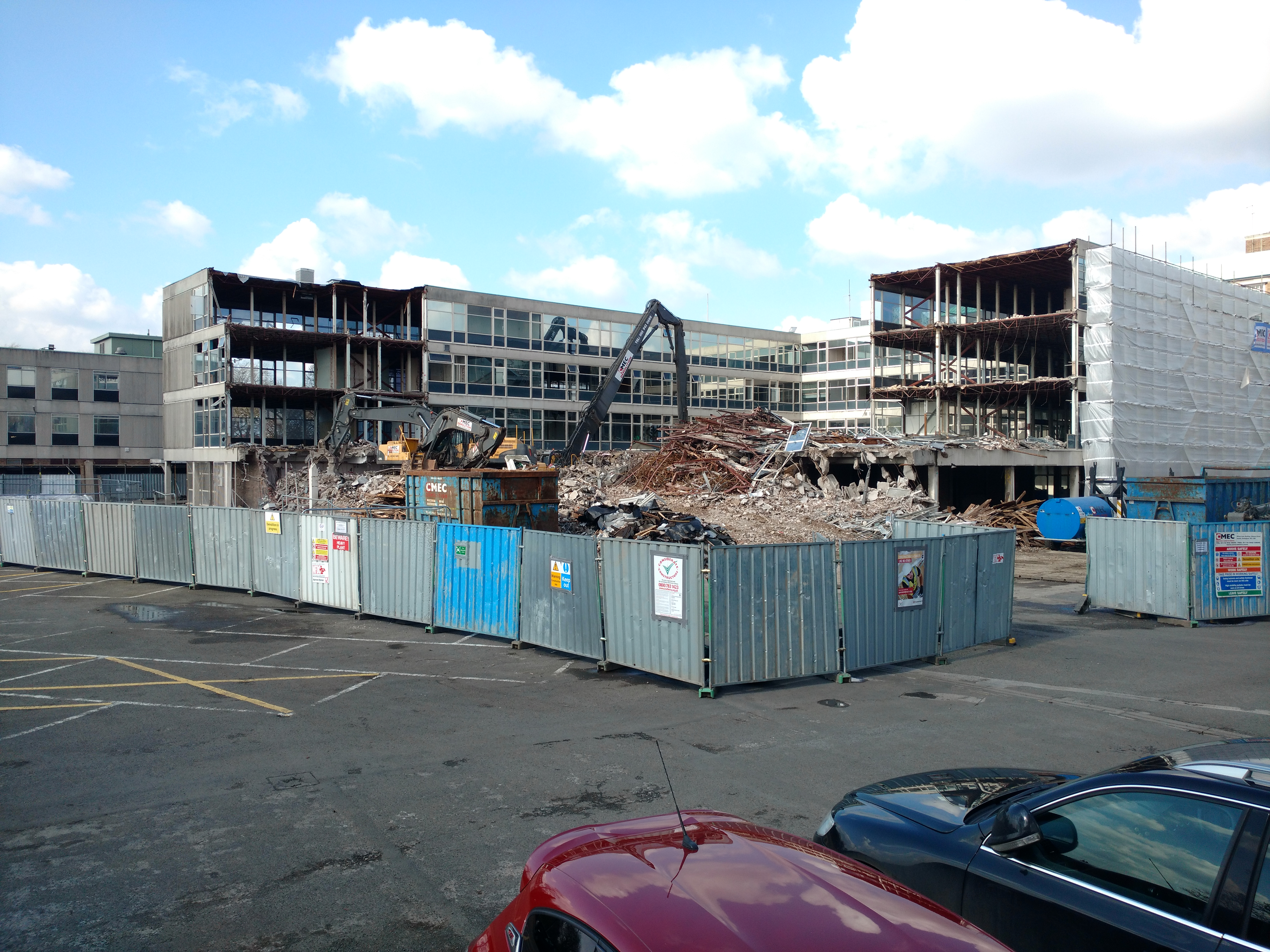
Demolition of CLASP block at Nottinghamshire County Hall, 2017

== Railways ==
Between the late 1960s and the early 1970s, the CLASP system was implemented by British Rail, particularly in the former Southern Region.

== Modernisation projects ==
Mid century built CLASP buildings are coming to the end of their designed operational life. However many projects have been carried out over the years to modernise them and increase energy efficiencies. Such projects involve re-roofing, re-cladding or painting the external skin of the building to give a modern look, replacement of sky lights and atriums with double glazing solar reduction glass and internal refits where additional insulation is added when rooms are renovated. Internal renovations can include new carpets, new ceiling tiles, efficient LED lighting and smart building management system controls.

The structural integrity of CLASP buildings is robust, the design being based on strong concrete foundations, metal framing supports and concrete cladding which give the building an unlimited lifetime timeframe (with small maintenance carried out). It is these design fundamentals of CLASP that can allow buildings to last more than a hundred years.

A report commissioned by Nottinghamshire County Council in 2008 stated it is far more efficient and environmentally friendly to modernise CLASP buildings than to knock down and replace them. It said that when costings for repairs of CLASP buildings match or exceed the cost for a new build, a factor which is never taken into consideration is the environmental damage caused by removing one building, and using up precious resources to build another. The report went on to say there must be a strong business case to justify why the environmental aspect of demolish and rebuild is ignored when it comes to modernising assets.

== Asbestos in CLASP buildings ==
Around 3,000 CLASP buildings are still in use across Britain. Since they were built using asbestos, including as fire-proofing on structural columns and as a replacement for materials of which there were shortages, they are a particular focus of the campaign to remove asbestos from school buildings in the UK. Asbestos is now known to present a serious health concern.
