= Nottinghamshire County Council =

Local government authority in England

Type
- Type: County council

Leadership
- Chair: Christopher Adegoke, Reform UK since 14 May 2026
- Leader: Mick Barton, Reform UK since 22 May 2025
- Chief Executive: Adrian Smith since September 2022

Structure
- Seats: 66 councillors
- Political groups: Administration (41) Reform UK (41) Other parties (25) Conservatives (18) Labour (4) Broxtowe Alliance (1) Broxtowe Ind. (1) Independent (1)
- Length of term: 4 years

Elections
- Voting system: First past the post
- Last election: 1 May 2025

Meeting place
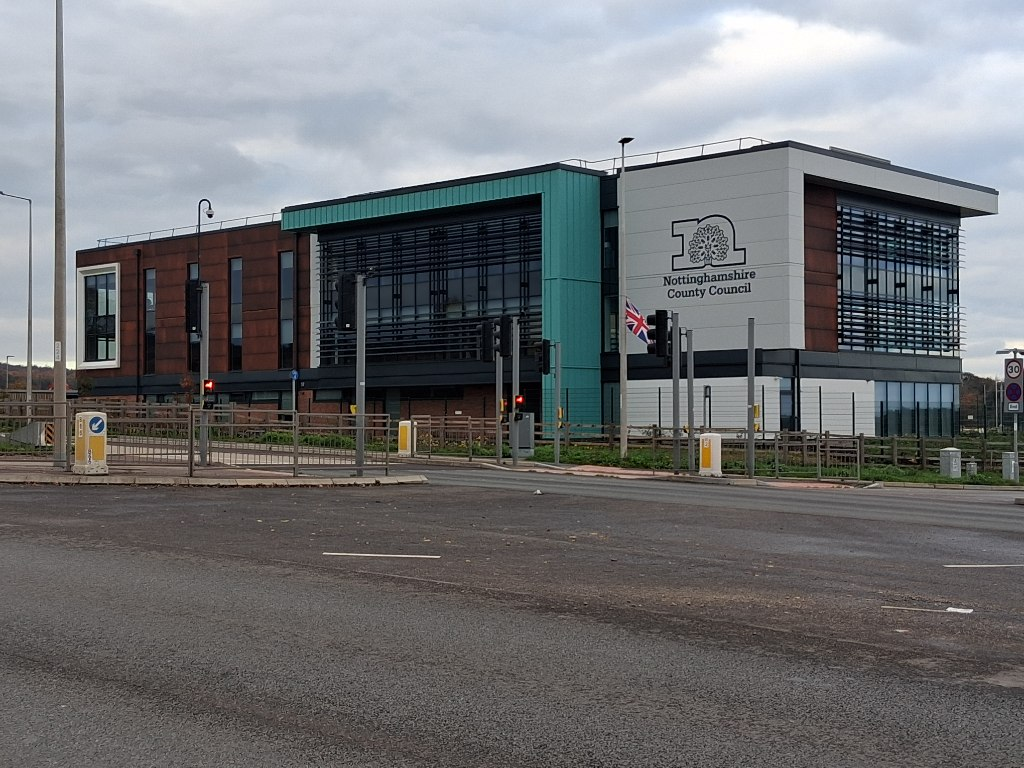
- Oak House, 1 Michaelmas Way, Linby, Nottingham, NG15 8LG

Website
- Nottinghamshire County Council

Nottinghamshire County Council is the upper-tier local authority for the non-metropolitan county of Nottinghamshire in England. The non-metropolitan county is smaller than the ceremonial county; the non-metropolitan county excludes the city of Nottingham, with Nottingham City Council being a unitary authority, independent from the county council. The county council comprises 66 councillors, elected from 56 electoral divisions every four years. The council's headquarters are at Oak House in Linby, near Hucknall. The council has been under Reform UK majority control since the 2025 election.

The council is a constituent member of the East Midlands Combined County Authority.

== History ==
Elected county councils were created in 1889 under the Local Government Act 1888, taking over many administrative functions that had previously been performed by unelected magistrates at the quarter sessions. The borough of Nottingham had been a county corporate since 1449 with its own quarter sessions, and Nottingham's independence from the surrounding county was maintained by making it a county borough. The county council was elected by and provided services to the remainder of the county outside the borough of Nottingham. The county council's area was termed the administrative county.

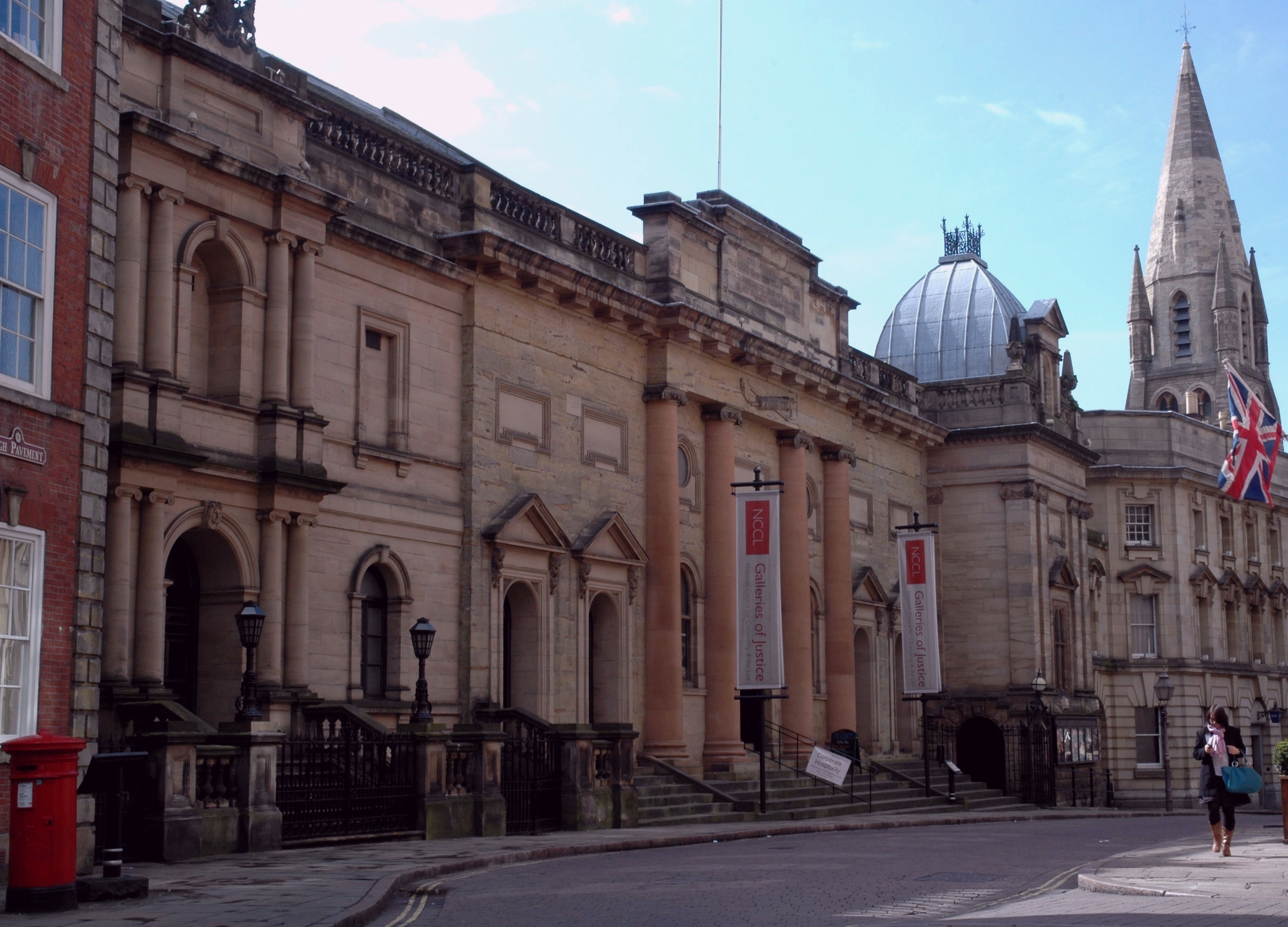
Old Shire Hall, High Pavement, Nottingham: Council's meeting place 1889–1954

The first elections to the county council were held on 15 January 1889, with 51 councillors being elected. There were also 17 aldermen chosen by the councillors to serve on the council as well. The council formally came into its powers on 1 April 1889, on which day it held its first official meeting at the Shire Hall in Nottingham, the courthouse (built 1770) which served as the meeting place for the quarter sessions. Henry Strutt, Lord Belper, a Liberal Unionist peer, was the first chairman of the council.

Nottinghamshire was reconstituted in 1974 as a non-metropolitan county by the Local Government Act 1972; the first elections to the reformed council were held in 1973. Whilst previously the City of Nottingham was an independent county borough and therefore not included in the administrative county, the redefined non-metropolitan county included Nottingham for the first time as a non-metropolitan district. The lower tier of local government was reorganised as part of the same reforms. Prior to 1974 it had comprised numerous boroughs, urban districts and rural districts. They were replaced within eight non-metropolitan districts (including Nottingham). In 1998, Nottingham regained its independence from the county council when the city council was made a unitary authority.

In 2024 a combined authority was established covering Nottinghamshire, Nottingham, Derby and Derbyshire, called the East Midlands Combined County Authority. The combined authority is chaired by the directly elected Mayor of the East Midlands and oversees the delivery of certain strategic functions across the area.

== Governance ==
Nottinghamshire County Council provides county-level services such as education, transport, social care, libraries, trading standards and waste management. District-level services are provided by the area's seven district councils:

- Ashfield
- Bassetlaw
- Broxtowe
- Gedling
- Mansfield
- Newark and Sherwood
- Rushcliffe

Much of the county is also covered by civil parishes, which form a third tier of local government.

=== Political control ===
The council has been under Reform UK majority control since 2025.

Political control of the council since the 1974 reforms took effect has been as follows:

| Party in control | Years |
|---|---|
| Labour | 1974–1977 |
| Conservative | 1977–1981 |
| Labour | 1981–2009 |
| Conservative | 2009–2013 |
| Labour | 2013–2017 |
| No overall control | 2017–2021 |
| Conservative | 2021–2025 |
| Reform | 2025–present |

=== Leadership ===
The leaders of the council since 1974 have been:

| Councillor | Party | From | To |
|---|---|---|---|
| Dick Wilson | Labour | 1 Apr 1974 | May 1977 |
| Peter Wright | Conservative | May 1977 | Oct 1979 |
| Herbert Bird | Conservative | Oct 1979 | 1981 |
| Gordon Cragg | Conservative | 1981 | May 1981 |
| Dennis Pettitt | Labour | May 1981 | 2001 |
| Mick Warner | Labour | 2001 | May 2005 |
| David Kirkham | Labour | 19 May 2005 | Jun 2009 |
| Kay Cutts | Conservative | 18 Jun 2009 | May 2013 |
| Alan Rhodes | Labour | May 2013 | May 2017 |
| Kay Cutts | Conservative | 25 May 2017 | May 2021 |
| Ben Bradley | Conservative | 27 May 2021 | 5 Dec 2024 |
| Sam Smith | Conservative | 5 Dec 2024 | May 2025 |
| Mick Barton | Reform | 22 May 2025 | |

=== Composition ===
Following the 2025 election, one newly elected Reform UK councillor resigned less than a week later. A by-election to fill the vacant seat took place on 3 July 2025 with a Conservative victory. Currently, the council's composition is:

| Party | Councillors |
|---|---|
| Reform | 41 |
| Conservative | 18 |
| Labour | 4 |
| Broxtowe Alliance | 1 |
| Broxtowe Independent Group | 1 |
| Independent | 1 |
| Total | 66 |

The next elections are due in 2029.

== Premises ==
Since 2025, the council has had its main offices and meeting place at Oak House in Linby, near Hucknall. (Note: The official postal address is Linby, Nottingham; Nottingham is the post town covering both Linby and Hucknall.)

=== County Hall ===
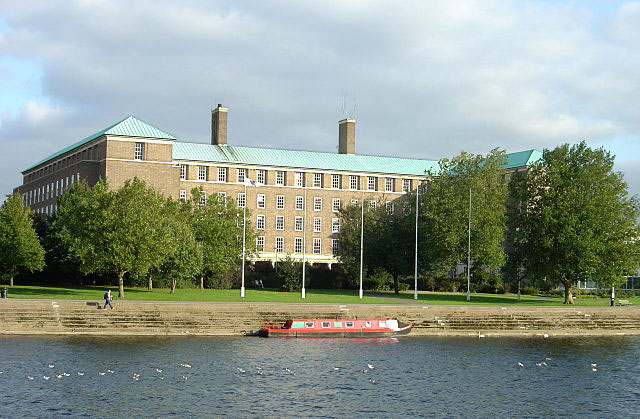
County Hall, West Bridgford

When the county council was first created it met at the Shire Hall on High Pavement in Nottingham, a courthouse built in 1770 which had been the meeting place of the quarter sessions which preceded the county council.

The council moved to County Hall in 1954; construction had begun in 1939 but had been paused due to the Second World War. When construction began the site was within the boundaries of Nottingham. Boundary changes in April 1952 adjusted the boundary between Nottingham and West Bridgford in this area to follow the centre of the River Trent, transferring the County Hall site and other areas on the south bank of the Trent from Nottingham to West Bridgford.

=== Oak House ===
The County Council new-build headquarters called Oak House on the A611 Annesley Road in the parish of Linby on the northern outskirts of Hucknall held the first meeting of councillors in March 2025.

Even before Oak House's opening there were reports highlighting size concerns, with then-leader Sam Smith citing uncertainty over future government reforms.

=== Trent Bridge House ===
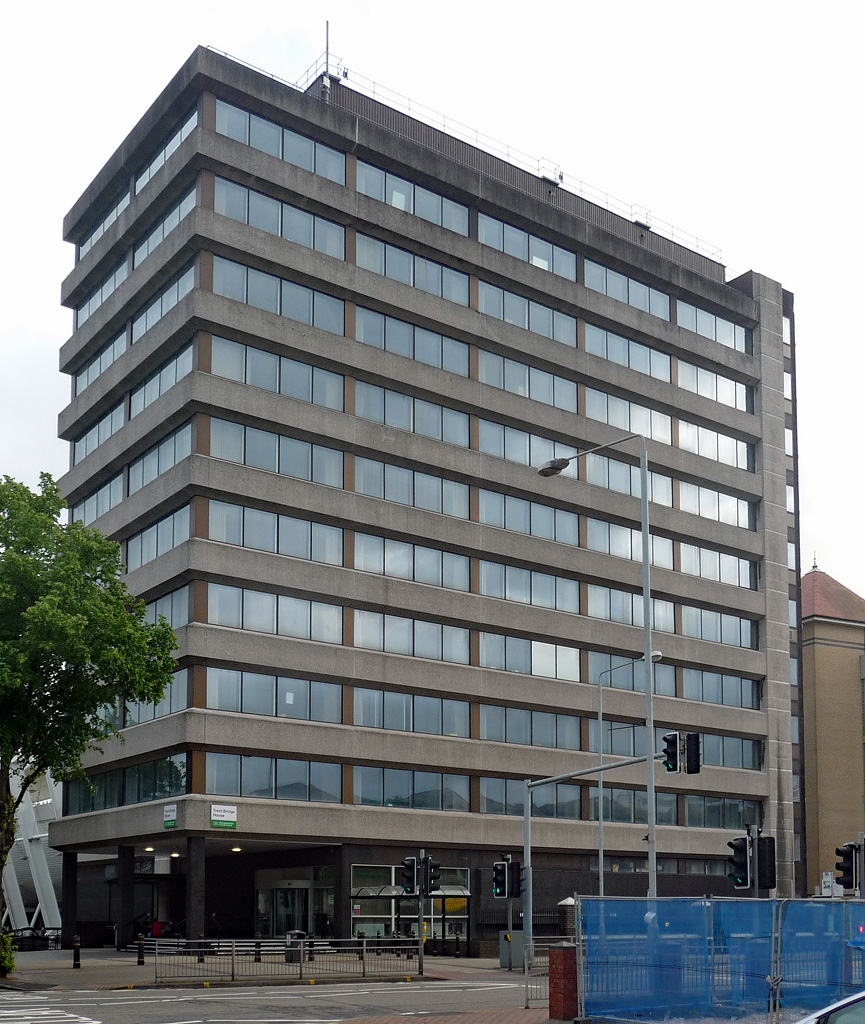
Trent Bridge House, junction of Radcliffe and Fox Roads

Trent Bridge House, located in the Trent Bridge area, contains administrative and services to support local council. The council plans to move more council services to the building as part of its departure from County Hall. The estimated costs for essential works to support this move are £500,000. The office is also occupied by Via East Midlands since 2016. It is also occupied by Start Service.

=== Offices ===
Nottinghamshire County Council operates a number of administrative and service buildings across the county. These facilities support local government functions and provide services to residents in various districts.

==== Mansfield ====
- County House, located on Chesterfield Road South, Mansfield (NG19 7BH), serves as a key administrative centre in the district.
- Meadow House, situated in Littleworth, Mansfield (NG18 2TB), provides additional local services.
- MyPlace at Westfield Folkhouse, situated on Westfield Lane, Mansfield (NG18 1TL), provides Youth Services, an Inspire College and additional offices for council staff.

==== Newark and Sherwood ====
- Newark Touchdown, on Bailey Road, Newark (NG24 4EP), offers council services to the Newark area.
- Sherwood Energy Village, located on Darwin Drive, New Ollerton (NG22 9GS), is part of a sustainable development initiative in the Sherwood area.

==== Ashfield ====
- Lawn View House, at 40 Station Road, Sutton-in-Ashfield (NG17 5GA), functions as a local service hub.
- Piazza Building, based in Sherwood Business Park, Little Oaks Drive, Annesley (NG15 0DR), houses council offices and service teams.

==== Gedling ====
- Sir John Robinson Way, in Arnold, Nottingham (NG5 6DA), accommodates council operations for the Gedling district.
- Oak House, located at 1 Michaelmas Way, Linby (NG15 8LG), provides additional support services.

==== Rushcliffe ====
- County Hall, on Loughborough Road, West Bridgford (NG2 7QP), is the headquarters of Nottinghamshire County Council.
- Trent Bridge House, situated on Fox Road, West Bridgford (NG2 6BJ), hosts various council departments and services.

== Social care ==
The council is a pioneer in the use of technology-based care to keep disabled adults in their own homes. The Technology Enabled Care service was started in 2007. It now uses home sensors to help detect falls, incontinence and unusual patterns in daily habits. It supported 4,600 people in 2024. The system automatically alerts staff at a 24-hour monitoring service. It reduced the costs of services by more than £2.75 million in 2024.

== Elections ==
Since the last boundary changes in 2017 the council has comprised 66 councillors representing 56 electoral divisions, with each division electing one or two councillors. Elections are held every four years.

=== Electoral divisions ===
Nottinghamshire is divided into 56 divisions for electoral purposes. Current boundaries have been in place since 2017 following a review by the Local Government Boundary Commission for England. Each Councillor is allocated a locality budget, described as their "Councillors' Divisional Fund".

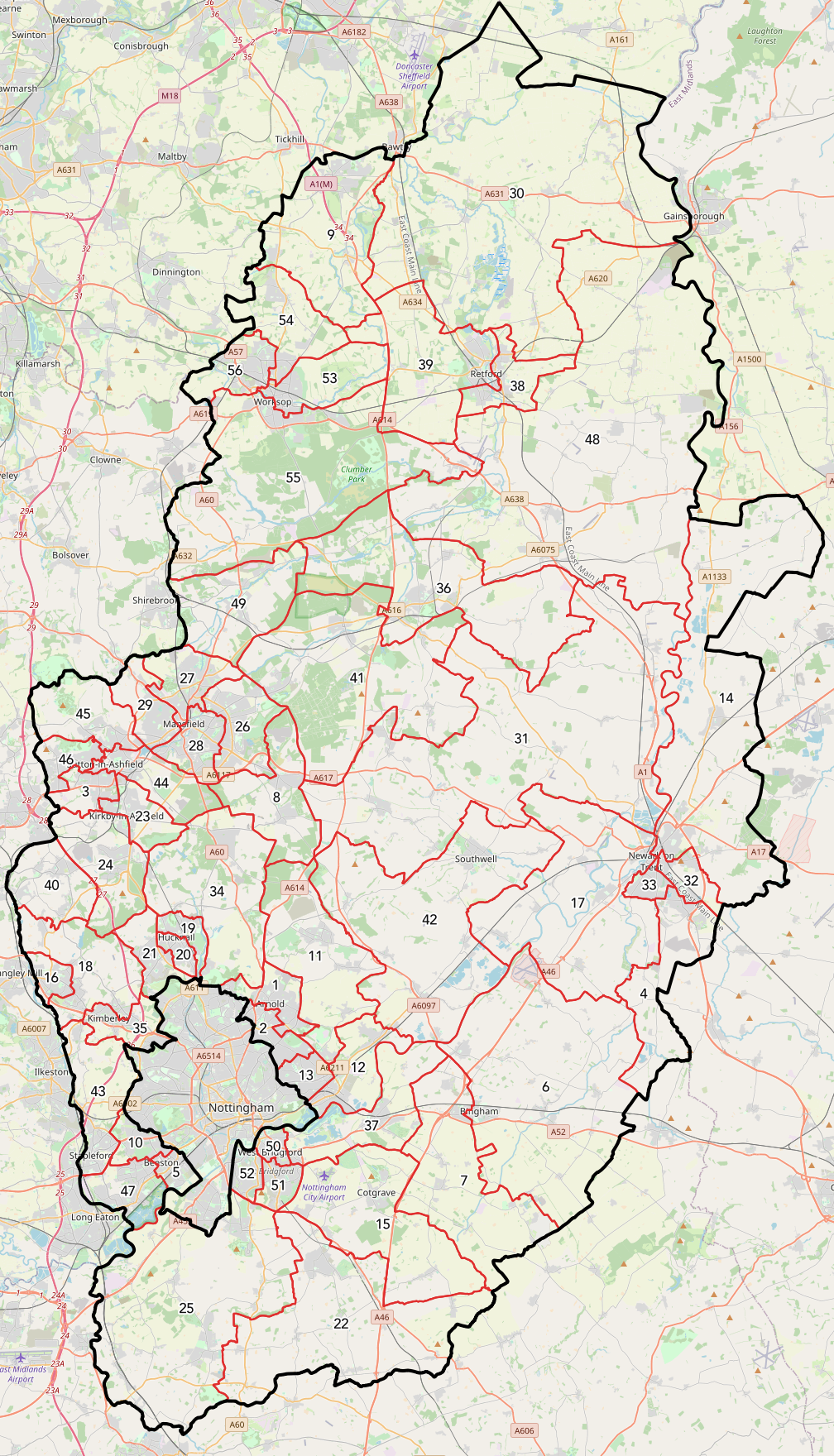
Map of the electoral divisions of Nottinghamshire.

| Map No. | Electoral division | Councillors |
|---|---|---|
| 1 | Arnold North | 2 |
| 2 | Arnold South | 2 |
| 3 | Ashfields | 1 |
| 4 | Balderton | 1 |
| 5 | Beeston Central & Rylands | 1 |
| 6 | Bingham East | 1 |
| 7 | Bingham West | 1 |
| 8 | Blidworth | 1 |
| 9 | Blyth & Harworth | 1 |
| 10 | Bramcote & Beeston North | 1 |
| 11 | Calverton | 1 |
| 12 | Carlton East | 1 |
| 13 | Carlton West | 2 |
| 14 | Collingham | 1 |
| 15 | Cotgrave | 1 |
| 16 | Eastwood | 1 |
| 17 | Farndon & Trent | 1 |
| 18 | Greasley & Brinsley | 1 |
| 19 | Hucknall North | 1 |
| 20 | Hucknall South | 1 |
| 21 | Hucknall West | 1 |
| 22 | Keyworth | 1 |
| 23 | Kirkby North | 1 |
| 24 | Kirkby South | 1 |
| 25 | Leake & Ruddington | 2 |
| 26 | Mansfield East | 2 |
| 27 | Mansfield North | 2 |
| 28 | Mansfield South | 2 |
| 29 | Mansfield West | 2 |
| 30 | Misterton | 1 |
| 31 | Muskham & Farnsfield | 1 |
| 32 | Newark East | 1 |
| 33 | Newark West | 1 |
| 34 | Newstead | 1 |
| 35 | Nuthall & Kimberley | 1 |
| 36 | Ollerton | 1 |
| 37 | Radcliffe on Trent | 1 |
| 38 | Retford East | 1 |
| 39 | Retford West | 1 |
| 40 | Selston | 1 |
| 41 | Sherwood Forest | 1 |
| 42 | Southwell | 1 |
| 43 | Stapleford & Broxtowe Central | 2 |
| 44 | Sutton Central & East | 1 |
| 45 | Sutton North | 1 |
| 46 | Sutton West | 1 |
| 47 | Toton, Chilwell & Attenborough | 2 |
| 48 | Tuxford | 1 |
| 49 | Warsop | 1 |
| 50 | West Bridgford North | 1 |
| 51 | West Bridgford South | 1 |
| 52 | West Bridgford West | 1 |
| 53 | Worksop East | 1 |
| 54 | Worksop North | 1 |
| 55 | Worksop South | 1 |
| 56 | Worksop West | 1 |
