= 1889 West Suffolk County Council election =

1889 English local government election

Elections to the first West Suffolk County Council were held on Thursday 24 January 1889.

There were 39 electoral divisions:

Division	Nomination	Nomination	Elected
Boxton			
Bildeston			
Bures St Mary			
Clare			
Cavendish			
Glemsford			
Haverhill			
Hadleigh			
Hundon			
Ixworth			
Lavenham			
Lawshall			
Long Melford			
Waldingfield			
Bury St Edmunds			
Sudbury			
Thurlow			
