= 1889 Montgomeryshire County Council election =

1889 Welsh local government election

The first elections to the Montgomeryshire County Council were held in January 1889. 22 Liberals and 18 Conservatives were elected.

== Ward results ==
=== Cemmaes ===
Cemmaes ward
Party	Candidate	Votes	%	±%
Liberal	David Evans	147		
Independent	Edward Hughes	126		
Majority		21		

=== Darowen ===
Darowen ward
Party	Candidate	Votes	%	±%
Liberal	Evan Hughes Cilywenlian	112		
Conservative	Joseph Evans	93		
Independent	John Owen	37		
Majority		19		

=== Llanbrynmair ===
Llanbrynmair ward
Party	Candidate	Votes	%	±%
Conservative	H. L. Smith	139		
Liberal	A. P. Howell	81		
Majority		58		

=== Llanidloes Borough ===
Llanidloes Borough ward
Party	Candidate	Votes	%	±%
Liberal	John Jenkins	305		
Liberal	William Thomas	290		
Conservative	Evan Williams	161		
Conservative	John Kitto	148		
Majority				

=== Llanidloes Parish ===
Llanidloes Parish ward
Party	Candidate	Votes	%	±%
Liberal	William Henry Williams	143		
Conservative	Evan Powell	62		
Majority		81		

=== Machynlleth ===
Machynlleth ward
Party	Candidate	Votes	%	±%
Conservative	Lord Henry Vane-Tempest	221		
Liberal	John Rowlands	150		
Majority		71		

=== Newtown ===
Newtown ward
Party	Candidate	Votes	%	±%
Liberal	T. Parry Jones	650		
Liberal	Martin Woosnam	592		
Liberal	Richard Lloyd	581		
Liberal	Hugh Lewis	562		
Ind. Conservative	Pryce Pryce-Jones	556		
Ind. Conservative	Edward Pryce-Jones	506		
Ind. Conservative	Edward Powell	388		
Ind. Conservative	A. D. Dawson	376		
Majority				

=== Uwchygarreg ===
Uwchygarreg ward
Party	Candidate	Votes	%	±%
Liberal	Edward Davies	96		
Conservative	W. E. Gilbertson Pritchard	39		
Majority		57		

=== Welshpool ===
Welshpool ward
Party	Candidate	Votes	%	±%
Conservative	George Herbert, Lord Powis	749		
Conservative	David Richards	705		
Conservative	Cpt. Mytton	637		
Conservative	Abraham Howell	500		
Liberal	David Bebb	436		
Conservative	John Jones	400		
Majority				

== Bibliography ==
- Morgan, Kenneth O. (1967). "Cardiganshire Politics: The Liberal Ascendancy 1885-1923". Ceredigion. 5 (4): 311–346.
