= 1889 Nottinghamshire County Council election =

Election for Nottinghamshire County Council

Map of Nottinghamshire within the various counties of Great Britain & Ireland.

Elections to the first Nottinghamshire County Council were held on 15 January 1889. The new council consisted of 68 members; 51 councillors and 17 aldermen. Of the 17 aldermen, 7 were elected from the county council, and 10 from outside the county council.

Amongst those elected was one Labour Electoral Association candidate; William Mellors, who topped the poll in the Byron Division. Five candidates, including Mellors ran in the division, with 2 Conservatives also being elected, whilst three Liberals failed to be elected. Following the vote the Liberal candidates accused Mellors of splitting the vote. Following the election the council was controlled by Conservatives and allied political independents, and their control would continue until 1946.

Following the election Henry Strutt, 2nd Baron Belper was nominated as chairman. Over half of the councils members came from Nottinghamshire's landowning class, although this would decline in later years.

Provisional meetings of the new County Council were held on 24 January and 28 February 1889, with the first full meeting being held on 1 April 1889.
