= 1889 Durham County Council election =

English local election

Map of Durham within the various counties of Great Britain & Ireland.

The inaugural elections to Durham County Council took place in January 1889. Durham was divided into 72 electoral divisions, with candidates in 32 divisions being returned unopposed. The election saw control of the council being taken by Conservative candidates, although these candidates were largely Independent conservatives as opposed to being party activists.

== Results ==
Durham County Council election, 1889
Party	Seats	Gains	Losses	Net gain/loss	Seats %	Votes %	Votes	+/−
Conservative	28							
Liberal	26							
Liberal Unionist	8							
Durham Miners Association	4							
Other parties	6							
