= Middlesex County Council elections =

Middlesex County Council under the Local Government Act 1888 had to be returned by local elections every three years. Its first election was in January 1889, the year the council first met. The last was in 1961 as the 1964 elections instead were – as to 83 of 87 divisions – for the larger, in-waiting (Note: meaning dormant for one year pending its following April creation) Greater London Council – 4 divisions went into other counties, on abolition. Three intra-war elections were never announced and formally cancelled but otherwise expected in 1916, 1940 and 1943.

The much more urban minority of the county had been directed by Parliament to co-form (Note: London County Council (L.C.C.) matched the Metropolitan Board of Works statutory area. It drew on slightly more land from Surrey combined with Kent than from Middlesex.) the County – and thus area of that separate County Council – of London in 1889.

Political make-up split into three periods, each one shorter than the last. The first period of local political preferences of 45 years saw victories somewhat reliant on independents and Liberals, but quite concertedly anti-socialist councillors, many or most of whom Conservatives. The second period saw a knife-edge marginal "swing chamber" or "swing county council". In 1958 voters were more socialist than bellwethers, defying the nation's popular and electoral outcome of the next year. Politically wavering and/or new Middlesex voters across a decisive 15 of 87 electoral districts returned to the Conservatives three years later but the 1958 result presaged the second clear ascendancy of the Labour Party. Labour went on immediately after the county's administrative demise to success in the form of the First and Second Wilson ministries and a string of successes in the enlarged London.

== 20th century growth in housing and population ==
Middlesex considerably urbanised – whereas the population of London after 1911 fell, in favour of commercial property and the clearance of slum, overcrowded and war-damaged housing. The number of Middlesex homes, an area static in size, rose from 236,266 to 665,347 in the forty years to 1961.

The county's conserved, suburban character over the council's lifetime changed. By 1958 it is clear the bulk of the population could not be seen as core base "Villa Tory" shopkeepers, merchants, finance sector workers, and business owners. New homes dominated Wembley, Harrow, Hendon, Southgate, Enfield, Feltham, Staines, Twickenham, Uxbridge, Ruislip and north Ealing districts. New factories and warehouses employed tens of thousands in Brentford, Perivale, Greenford, Heston, Harmondsworth and West Drayton. This contrasts with the prior drawing-up of the territory that seized on a decades-earlier definition of the 'capital's metropolis' as the County of London. In new, or rump, Middlesex this "cracked" i.e. pitched the social bulk of voters against heavily working class Acton, Tottenham and Edmonton to form the 1889 definition of the county. The urbanisation flowed equally from swathes of non-state-assisted housing built as much as from the London Blitz, post-war rationing, poverty, general austerity and so central edicts and incentives from the Ministry of Housing to provide social housing. Across these divisions the quickly-built housing became equivalent to a large, de facto, New Town for residents displaced by the destruction of London homes and communities – the number of homes multiplied by 2.8 in the forty years mentioned.

== 1889 – 1919 ==
The first elections were held in January 1889. The Times noted that, in contrast to most counties where a large of number of seats were uncontested, contests took place in nearly every electoral division.

The first meeting of the "provisional" county council was held on 14 February 1889 at Westminster Town Hall. The council did not use political labels but among the aldermen elected were three Liberal-leaning peers: balanced with three Conservative MPs. Four of the six held large houses with over 200 acres (1 km^{2}) liable to much of the local rates thus assumed to be involved in local interests, in the highly suburban small county. Three of these were manor houses so the owners would have been summoned to Hundred Courts the council replaced.

Name	Middlesex estate
The Earl of Aberdeen	Dollis Hill House/Villa, Dollis Hill, Willesden
The Earl of Jersey	Osterley House/Villa, Osterley Park, Osterley, Isleworth
The Earl of Strafford	Wrotham House, Wrotham Park, South Mimms
William Ambrose	Westover, next to Hampstead Heath, Hendon
Henry Bowles	Forty Hall, Enfield
Frederick Dixon-Hartland	n/a: 14 Chesham Place in the County of London

This body appointed an Apportionment Committee to liaise with the London County Council to apportion between the two bodies the old central meeting halls and other civic properties and responsibilities. It was decided to seek Middlesex Guildhall, Westminster, as the headquarters of the county council (extraterritorial but convenient to local-line terminus railway stations). The justices of the peace for Middlesex met to consider county business for the last time on 28 March 1889 at the Sessions House, Clerkenwell. The Sessions House duly passed to the London County Council, and Middlesex County Council came into official existence on 1 April 1889.

== 1919 – 1946 ==
The triennial elections were suspended for the duration of the First World War, and when polling was held on 8 March 1919 there was a vigorous campaign centred on the issue of the Sunday opening of cinemas. The Cinematograph Exhibitors Association supported 16 candidates, including members of the Labour Party, who gained their first seats on the council. The 1922 and 1925 elections were, for the most part, not run on party lines. The Times noted that it was "impossible to separate the candidates into different classes, and the contests are run much more upon local considerations than any widespread policy labelled throughout the county". The size of the council was increased in that year from 80 members (60 councillors and 20 aldermen) to 98 (74 councillors and 24 aldermen). The majority of the members of the county council continued not to bear party labels. In 1928 the majority of the council were described as "Moderate", with Labour forming an opposition. Labour continued to make advances at the 1931 election, and this led to the formation of a Middlesex Municipal Association "representative of all anti-Socialist members". The association was supported by the various Conservative Party organisations of the county although it was not officially affiliated to the party.

The number of councillors rose at the 1934 and 1937 elections.

Number of Councillors + Aldermen. MMA group formed a majority (bold)
Year	Total councillors	Middlesex Municipal Alliance	Labour Party	Independent
		(by affiliation)		
1934	75 + 25 (saw one vacant seat)	44 + 22	22 + 0	8 + 3
1937	80 + 25	50 + 18	21 + 7	9

== 1952 – 1955 ==
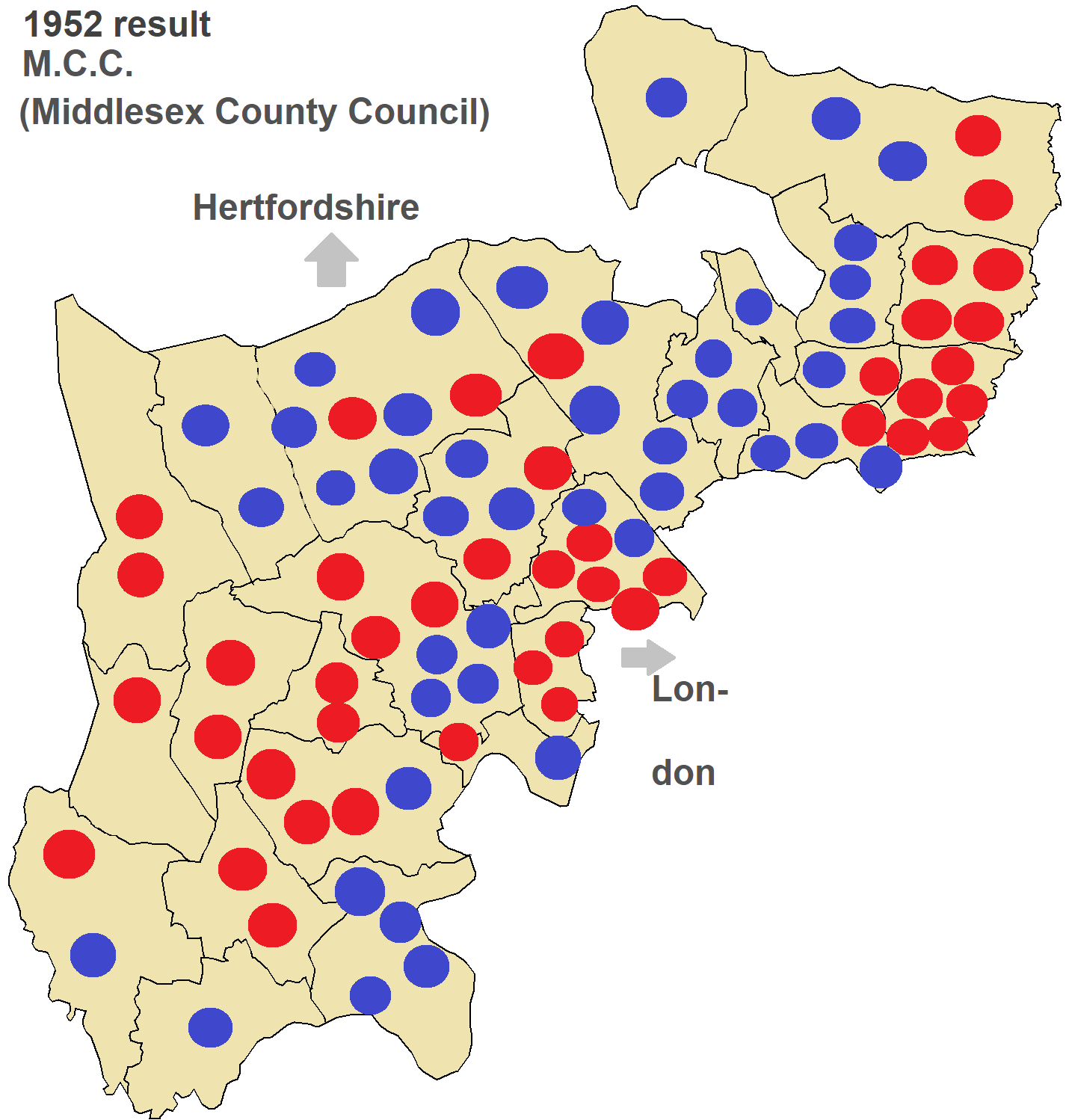
Results of the 1952 Middlesex County Council election

The boundaries of many electoral divisions were altered, with effect from elections of 3 April 1952. Their number, corresponding to that of councillors was reduced to 87, from 90.

The Conservatives retained control with 44 seats (a loss of 9) to Labour's 43 (a gain of 10). The only incumbent Independent was defeated. At the aldermanic elections, the Conservatives took 11 out of 14, levering their slender majority, against protests by the Labour group. Comparing the below tier of local government, Municipal Borough of Heston and Isleworth split into the county's electoral divisions: Heston & Cranford, Hounslow Central, Hounslow West, and Isleworth – the other divisions shared all or part of their name with their more local (lower tier) authority.

Electoral division	Party
Acton North East	Labour gain
Acton South East	Labour hold
Acton West	Labour gain
Brentford & Chiswick East	Conservative (new seat)
Brentford & Chiswick West	Labour (new seat)
Ealing Central	Conservative hold
Ealing East	Conservative (new seat)
Ealing North	Labour (new seat)
Ealing North East	Conservative (new seat)
Ealing North West	Labour hold
Ealing South	Conservative (new seat)
Ealing West	Labour hold
Edmonton North East	Labour hold
Edmonton North West	Labour hold
Edmonton South East	Labour hold
Edmonton South West	Labour hold
Enfield Central	Conservative hold
Enfield North East	Labour hold
Enfield South East	Labour hold
Enfield West	Conservative hold
Feltham North	Labour (new seat)
Feltham South	Labour (new seat)
Finchley East	Conservative hold
Finchley North	Conservative hold
Finchley West	Conservative hold
Friern Barnet	Conservative hold
Harrow Central	Labour hold
Harrow East	Labour hold
Harrow East Central	Conservative hold
Harrow North East	Conservative hold
Harrow North West	Conservative hold
Harrow South	Conservative hold
Harrow South West	Conservative hold
Harrow West Central	Conservative hold
Hayes & Harlington North	Labour hold
Hayes & Harlington South	Labour hold
Hendon Central	Conservative (new seat)
Hendon East	Conservative (new seat)
Hendon North	Conservative hold
Hendon North West	Conservative (new seat)
Hendon South	Conservative (new seat)
Hendon West	Labour (new seat)
Heston & Cranford	Labour (new seat)
Hornsey Central	Labour hold
Hornsey Highgate	Conservative hold
Hornsey Muswell Hill	Conservative hold
Hornsey Stroud Green	Conservative hold
Hounslow Central	Labour gain
Hounslow West	Labour (new seat)
Isleworth	Conservative (new seat)
Potters Bar	Conservative hold
Ruislip-Northwood North West	Conservative hold
Ruislip-Northwood South East	Conservative hold
Southall North	Labour (new seat)
Southall South	Labour (new seat)
Southgate Middle	Conservative hold
Southgate North	Conservative hold
Southgate South	Conservative hold
Staines North West	Labour (new seat)
Staines South East	Conservative (new seat)
Sunbury	Conservative hold
Tottenham East	Labour (new seat)
Tottenham North	Labour (new seat)
Tottenham South East	Labour (new seat)
Tottenham South West	Labour (new seat)
Tottenham West	Labour (new seat)
Twickenham East	Conservative hold
Twickenham Hampton	Conservative hold
Twickenham Teddington	Conservative hold
Twickenham West	Conservative hold
Uxbridge North	Labour gain
Uxbridge South	Labour gain
Wembley East	Conservative hold
Wembley North East	Labour gain
Wembley North West	Conservative hold
Wembley South	Labour gain
Wembley West	Conservative hold
Willesden Church End	Labour (new seat)
Willesden Cricklewood	Conservative (new seat)
Willesden Green	Labour (new seat)
Willesden Harlesden	Labour (new seat)
Willesden Kensal Green	Labour (new seat)
Willesden Kilburn	Labour (new seat)
Willesden Mapesbury	Conservative (new seat)
Wood Green East	Labour gain
Wood Green West	Conservative gain
Yiewsley & West Drayton	Labour gain

== 1955 – 1958 ==
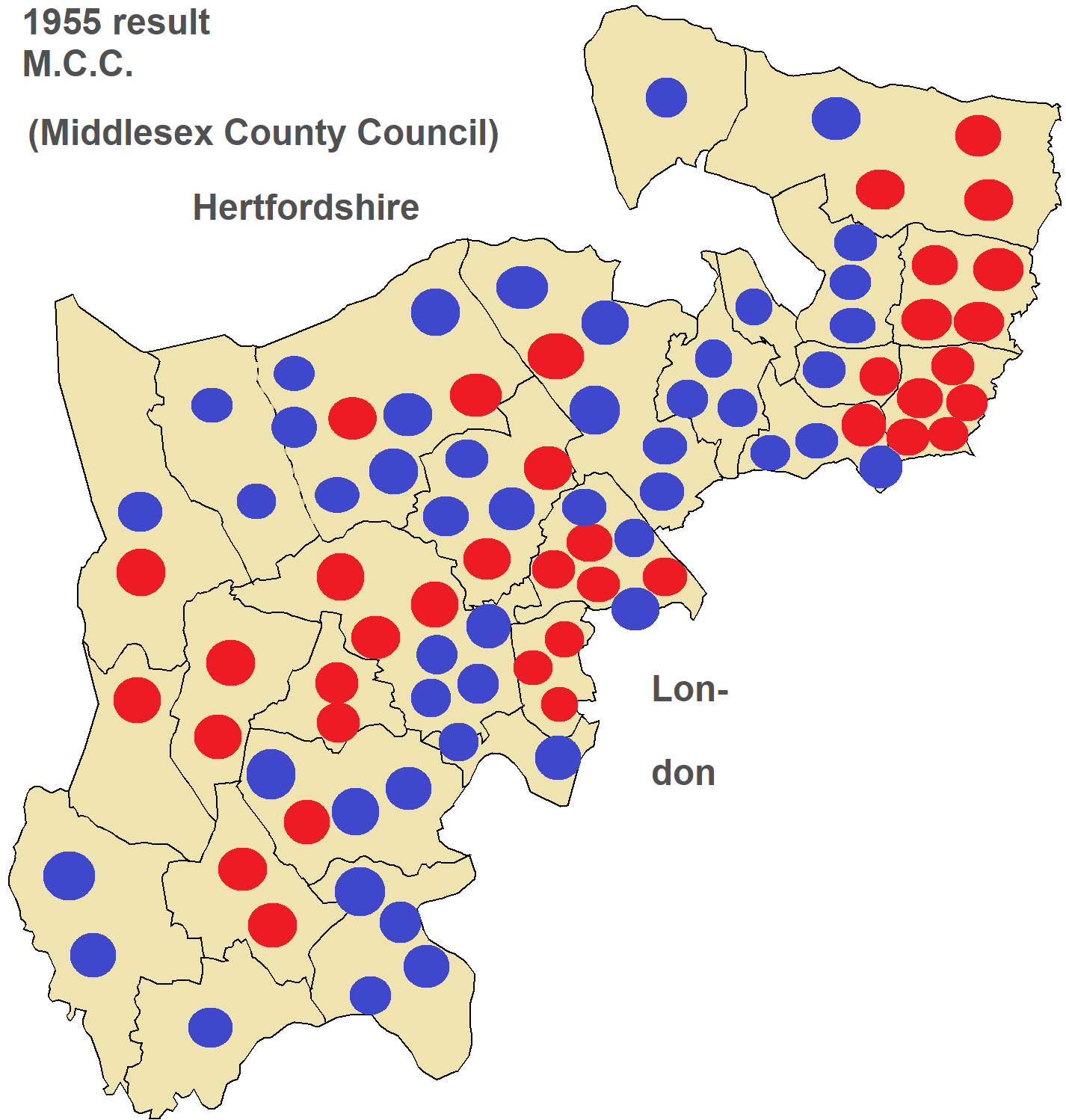
Results of the 1955 Middlesex County Council election

Some boundaries of electoral divisions were altered for the elections held on 31 March 1955. The number of these and thus councillors remained 87. Conservatives increased their majority on the council, winning 50 seats, against Labour's 37. Three Conservatives were elected unopposed.

Electoral division	Party
Acton North East	Labour hold
Acton South East	Labour hold
Acton West	Labour hold
Brentford & Chiswick East	Conservative hold
Brentford & Chiswick West	Conservative gain
Ealing Central	Conservative hold
Ealing East	Conservative hold
Ealing North	Labour hold
Ealing North East	Conservative hold
Ealing North West	Labour hold
Ealing South	Conservative hold
Ealing West	Labour hold
Edmonton North East	Labour hold
Edmonton North West	Conservative hold
Edmonton South East	Labour hold
Edmonton South West	Labour hold
Enfield North East	Labour hold (new boundaries)
Enfield North West	Conservative (new seat)
Enfield South East	Labour hold (new boundaries)
Enfield South West	Labour (new seat)
Feltham North	Labour hold
Feltham South	Labour hold
Finchley East	Conservative hold
Finchley North	Conservative hold
Finchley West	Conservative hold
Friern Barnet	Conservative hold
Harrow Central	Labour hold
Harrow East	Labour hold
Harrow East Central	Conservative hold
Harrow North East	Conservative hold
Harrow North West	Conservative hold
Harrow South	Conservative hold
Harrow South West	Conservative hold
Harrow West Central	Conservative hold
Hayes & Harlington North	Labour hold
Hayes & Harlington South	Labour hold
Hendon Central	Conservative hold
Hendon East	Conservative hold
Hendon North	Conservative hold
Hendon North West	Conservative hold
Hendon South	Conservative hold
Hendon West	Labour hold
Heston & Cranford	Conservative gain
Hornsey Central	Labour hold
Hornsey Highgate	Conservative hold
Hornsey Muswell Hill	Conservative hold
Hornsey Stroud Green	Conservative hold
Hounslow Central	Conservative gain
Hounslow West	Labour hold
Isleworth	Conservative hold
Potters Bar	Conservative hold
Ruislip-Northwood North West	Conservative hold (new boundaries)
Ruislip-Northwood South East	Conservative hold (new boundaries)
Southall North	Labour hold
Southall South	Labour hold
Southgate Middle	Conservative hold (new boundaries)
Southgate North	Conservative hold
Southgate South	Conservative hold
Staines North West	Conservative gain
Staines South East	Conservative hold
Sunbury	Conservative hold
Tottenham East	Labour hold
Tottenham North	Labour hold
Tottenham South East	Labour hold
Tottenham South West	Labour hold
Tottenham West	Labour hold
Twickenham East	Conservative hold
Twickenham Hampton	Conservative hold
Twickenham Teddington	Conservative hold
Twickenham West	Conservative hold
Uxbridge North	Conservative hold
Uxbridge South	Labour hold
Wembley East	Conservative hold
Wembley North East	Labour gain
Wembley North West	Conservative hold
Wembley South	Labour hold
Wembley West	Conservative hold
Willesden Church End	Labour hold
Willesden Cricklewood	Conservative hold
Willesden Green	Labour hold
Willesden Harlesden	Labour hold
Willesden Kensal Green	Conservative gain
Willesden Kilburn	Labour hold
Willesden Mapesbury	Conservative hold
Wood Green East	Labour hold
Wood Green West	Conservative hold
Yiewsley & West Drayton	Labour hold

== 1958 – 1961 ==
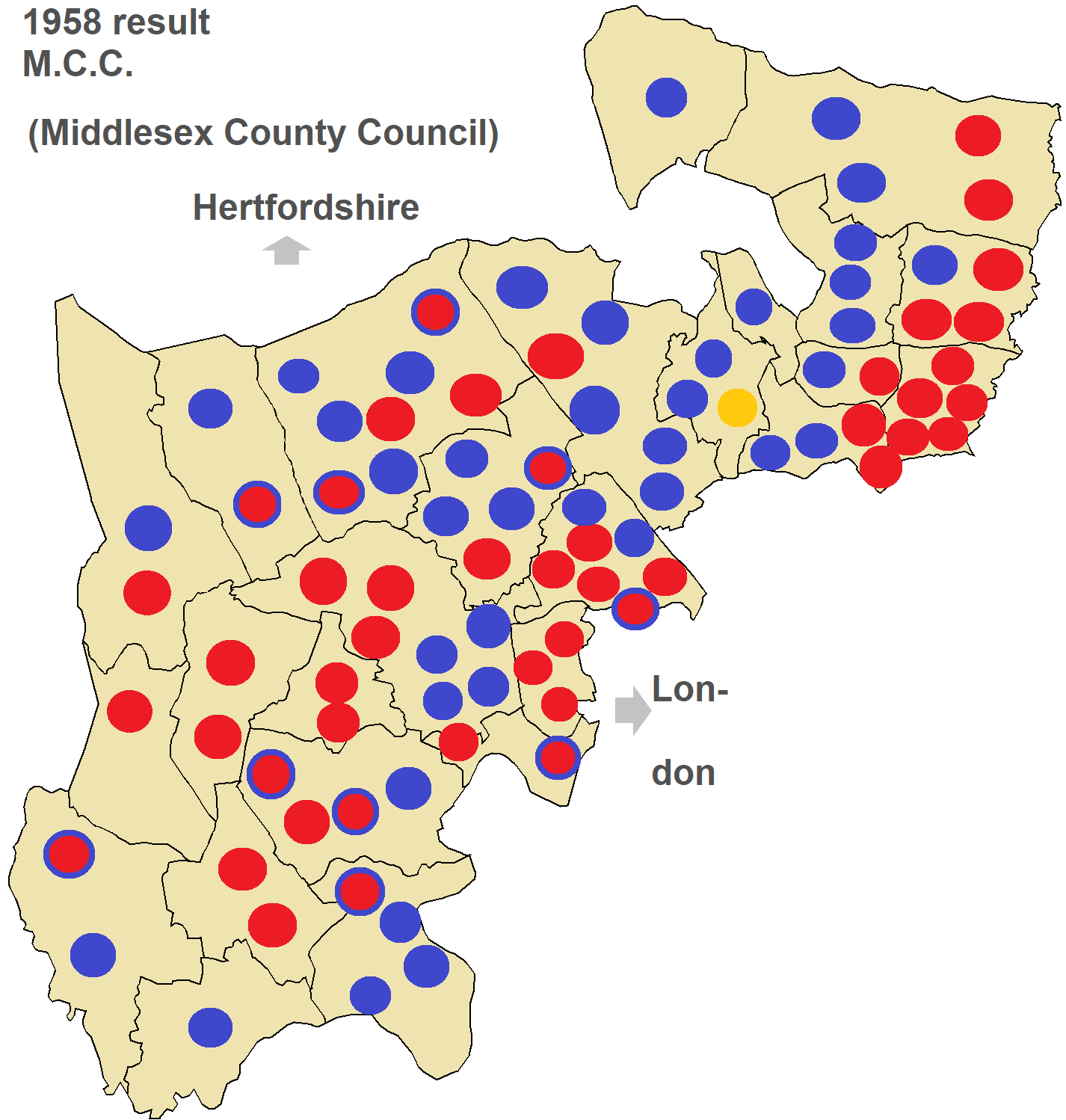
1958 result of Middlesex County Council elections, gains are all Labour, marked with a blue outline.

In the elections held on 16 April 1958, Labour (with 47 councillors) gained control from the Conservatives (with 39 councillors) and Finchley East's councillor was Liberal.

Electoral division	Party
Acton North East	Labour hold
Acton South East	Labour hold
Acton West	Labour hold
Brentford & Chiswick East	Labour gain
Brentford & Chiswick West	Labour hold
Ealing Central	Conservative hold
Ealing East	Conservative hold
Ealing North	Labour hold
Ealing North East	Conservative hold
Ealing North West	Labour hold
Ealing South	Conservative hold
Ealing West	Labour hold
Edmonton North East	Labour hold
Edmonton North West	Conservative hold
Edmonton South East	Labour hold
Edmonton South West	Labour hold
Enfield North East	Labour hold
Enfield North West	Conservative hold
Enfield South East	Labour hold
Enfield South West	Conservative hold
Feltham North	Labour hold
Feltham South	Labour hold
Finchley East	Liberal gain
Finchley North	Conservative hold
Finchley West	Conservative hold
Friern Barnet	Conservative hold
Harrow Central	Labour hold
Harrow East	Labour hold
Harrow East Central	Conservative hold
Harrow North East	Labour gain
Harrow North West	Conservative
Harrow South	Conservative hold
Harrow South West	Labour gain
Harrow West Central	Conservative hold
Hayes & Harlington North	Labour hold
Hayes & Harlington South	Labour hold
Hendon Central	Conservative hold
Hendon East	Conservative hold
Hendon North	Conservative hold
Hendon North West	Conservative hold
Hendon South	Conservative hold
Hendon West	Labour hold
Heston & Cranford	Labour gain
Hornsey Central	Labour hold
Hornsey Highgate	Conservative hold
Hornsey Muswell Hill	Conservative hold
Hornsey Stroud Green	Labour hold
Hounslow Central	Labour gain
Hounslow West	Labour hold
Isleworth	Conservative hold
Potters Bar	Conservative hold
Ruislip-Northwood North West	Conservative hold
Ruislip-Northwood South East	Labour gain
Southall North	Labour hold
Southall South	Labour hold
Southgate Middle	Conservative hold
Southgate North	Conservative hold
Southgate South	Conservative hold
Staines North West	Labour gain
Staines South East	Conservative hold
Sunbury	Conservative hold
Tottenham East	Labour hold
Tottenham North	Labour hold
Tottenham South East	Labour hold
Tottenham South West	Labour hold
Tottenham West	Labour hold
Twickenham East	Conservative hold
Twickenham Hampton	Conservative hold
Twickenham Teddington	Conservative hold
Twickenham West	Labour gain
Uxbridge North	Conservative hold
Uxbridge South	Labour hold
Wembley East	Conservative hold
Wembley North East	Labour gain
Wembley North West	Conservative hold
Wembley South	Labour hold
Wembley West	Conservative hold
Willesden Church End	Labour hold
Willesden Cricklewood	Conservative hold
Willesden Green	Labour hold
Willesden Harlesden	Labour hold
Willesden Kensal Green	Labour gain
Willesden Kilburn	Labour hold
Willesden Mapesbury	Conservative hold
Wood Green East	Labour hold
Wood Green West	Conservative hold
Yiewsley & West Drayton	Labour hold

== 1961 – 1965 ==
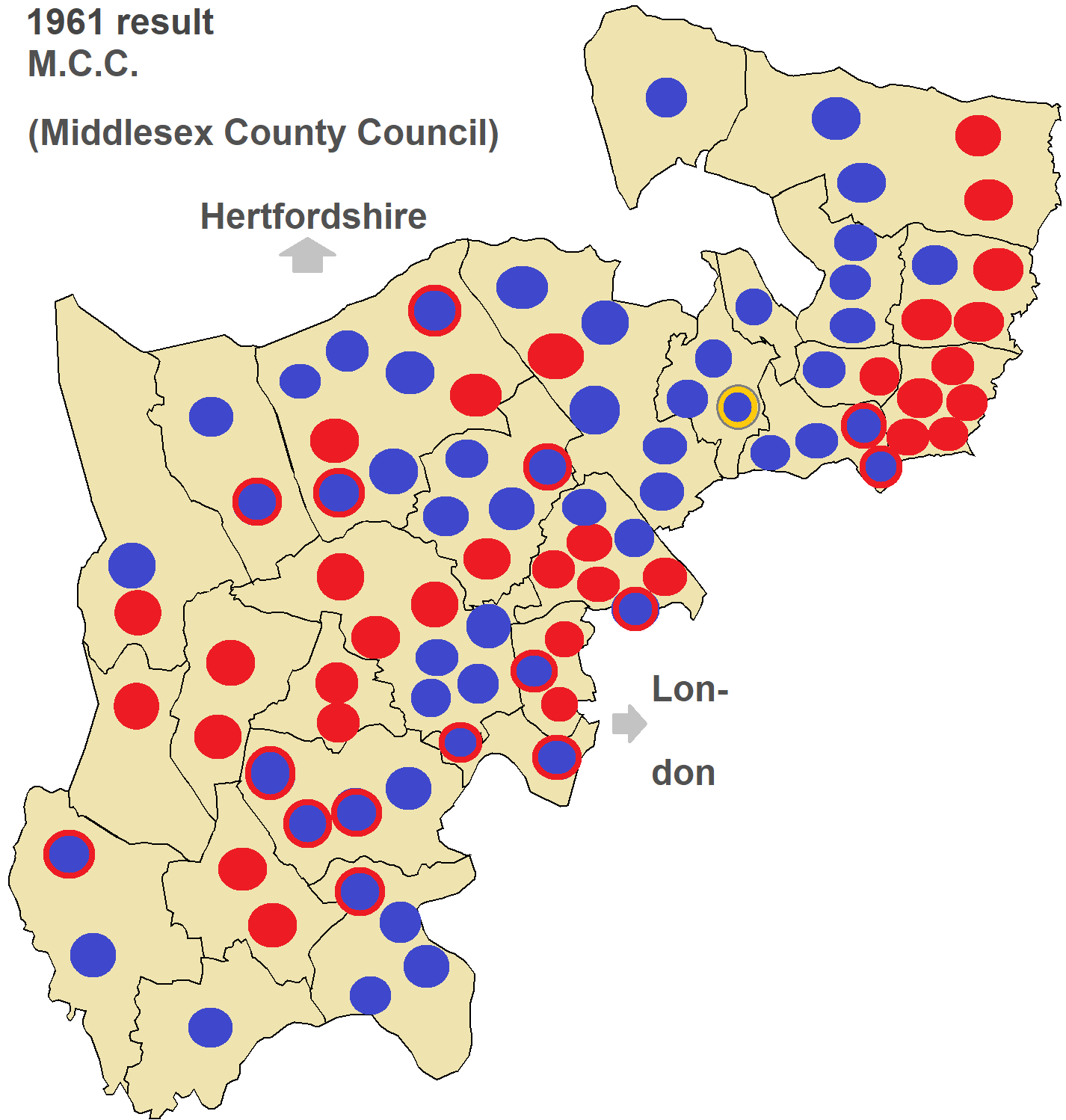
1961 result of Middlesex County Council elections, gains are all Conservative (blue cores with outlines)

On 13 April 1961 voters sent a majority of Conservatives to form the council: 55 out of 87, a gain of 15 seat from Labour and the Liberal seat. These became the final elections to the county council: under the London Government Act 1963 the next ones took place instead primarily for Greater London Council.

Electoral division	Party
Acton North East	Labour hold
Acton South East	Labour hold
Acton West	Conservative gain
Brentford & Chiswick East	Conservative gain
Brentford & Chiswick West	Conservative gain
Ealing Central	Conservative hold
Ealing East	Conservative hold
Ealing North	Labour hold
Ealing North East	Conservative hold
Ealing North West	Labour hold
Ealing South	Conservative hold
Ealing West	Labour hold
Edmonton North East	Labour hold
Edmonton North West	Conservative hold
Edmonton South East	Labour hold
Edmonton South West	Labour hold
Enfield North East	Labour hold
Enfield North West	Conservative hold
Enfield South East	Labour hold
Enfield South West	Conservative hold
Feltham North	Labour hold
Feltham South	Labour hold
Finchley East	Conservative gain
Finchley North	Conservative hold
Finchley West	Conservative hold
Friern Barnet	Conservative hold
Harrow Central	Labour hold
Harrow East	Labour hold
Harrow East Central	Conservative hold
Harrow North East	Conservative gain
Harrow North West	Conservative hold
Harrow South	Conservative hold
Harrow South West	Conservative gain
Harrow West Central	Conservative hold
Hayes & Harlington North	Labour hold
Hayes & Harlington South	Labour hold
Hendon Central	Conservative hold
Hendon East	Conservative hold
Hendon North	Conservative hold
Hendon North West	Conservative hold
Hendon South	Conservative hold
Hendon West	Labour hold
Heston & Cranford	Conservative gain
Hornsey Central	Conservative gain
Hornsey Highgate	Conservative hold
Hornsey Muswell Hill	Conservative hold
Hornsey Stroud Green	Conservative gain
Hounslow Central	Conservative gain
Hounslow West	Conservative gain
Isleworth	Conservative hold
Potters Bar	Conservative hold
Ruislip-Northwood North West	Conservative hold
Ruislip-Northwood South East	Conservative gain
Southall North	Labour hold
Southall South	Labour hold
Southgate Middle	Conservative hold
Southgate North	Conservative hold
Southgate South	Conservative hold
Staines North West	Conservative gain
Staines South East	Conservative hold
Sunbury	Conservative hold
Tottenham East	Labour hold
Tottenham North	Labour hold
Tottenham South East	Labour hold
Tottenham South West	Labour hold
Tottenham West	Labour hold
Twickenham East	Conservative hold
Twickenham Hampton	Conservative hold
Twickenham Teddington	Conservative hold
Twickenham West	Conservative gain
Uxbridge North	Conservative hold
Uxbridge South	Labour hold
Wembley East	Conservative hold
Wembley North East	Conservative gain
Wembley North West	Conservative hold
Wembley South	Labour hold
Wembley West	Conservative hold
Willesden Church End	Labour hold
Willesden Cricklewood	Conservative hold
Willesden Green	Labour hold
Willesden Harlesden	Labour hold
Willesden Kensal Green	Conservative gain
Willesden Kilburn	Labour hold
Willesden Mapesbury	Conservative hold
Wood Green East	Labour hold
Wood Green West	Conservative hold
Yiewsley & West Drayton	Labour hold
