= 1889 Lancashire County Council election =

1889 UK local government election

Administrative county of Lancashire

Elections to Lancashire County Council were held on Tuesday, 15 January 1889. The council was newly created, and at the time covered the entire administrative county of Lancashire.

Party politics played a limited role in Lancashire politics at the time, and would remain limited until the First World War. As a result, the election saw limited competition, with only 38.1% of divisions contested, in contrast to the 56.3% average across England & Wales in the 1889 local elections.

The limited role of party politics was also seen in the composition of the council leadership, with the first county Chairman being J. T. Hibbert, a Liberal, while his Vice-Chairman, C. R. Jackson, was a Conservative.

== Division results ==
=== Moss Side ===
Moss Side
Party	Candidate	Votes	%	±%
Liberal Unionist	Charles Hopkinson	792	52.3	
Independent	Frederick Murgatroyd	409	27.0	
Independent	Samuel Warren	312	20.7	
Majority		383	25.3	
Turnout		1,513		
Liberal Unionist win (new seat)				

=== Withington ===
Withington
Party	Candidate	Votes	%	±%
Independent	G. H. Gaddum	1,414	59.1	
Conservative	Robert Boyd	980	40.9	
Majority		434	18.2	
Turnout		2,394		
Independent win (new seat)				
