= 1889 Carnarvonshire County Council election =

1889 Welsh local government election

The first election to the Carnarvonshire County Council was held across the north Wales county of Caernarvonshire on 25 January 1889. It was followed by the 1892 election. The county was divided into numerous single member wards with two councillors elected to represent some of the urban areas.

The council comprised 48 members.

== Overview of the result ==
1889 was a landmark year in the history of Welsh Liberalism, a coming of age symbolized by the triumph across Wales of Liberal candidates in the inaugural county council elections. The outcome was very similar to that in Cardiganshire.

30 Liberals and 18 Conservatives were elected.

== Unopposed returns ==
15 councillors were elected unopposed.

== Contested elections ==
There were a large number of contested elections and the majorities were small in most instances. In most cases there were contests between Liberal and Conservative candidates.

== New council ==
The first meeting of the council was held in Caernarfon.
