= Merionethshire County Council =

Local authority in Wales (1889-1974)

Merionethshire County Council was a local authority in Wales from 1889 until its abolition in 1974.

== Overview ==
The administrative county of Merionethshire and its local authority, the Merionethshire County Council was established in 1889 under the Local Government Act 1888. The first elections were held in January 1889. The county was abolished under the Local Government Act 1972 on 1 April 1974.

A successor authority, Meirionnydd District Council, existed between 1974 and 1995. As a result of the Local Government (Wales) Act 1994, which came into force on 1 April 1996, it became part of the new unitary authority of Gwynedd Council.

== Early history, 1889–1914 ==
During the period, Liberal candidates win large majorities at each election and Conservative support was limited to some of the towns and areas where local gentry continued to gain some personal support. The leadership of the council was composed mainly of prosperous middle class tradesmen, professionals and nonconformist ministers.

=== 1889 election ===
The first election was held in 1889 and the Liberal Party held a large majority of the seats down to the First World War, reflecting its dominance over the politics of the county.

The first meeting of the council was a notable event. Samuel Pope, elected as temporary chairman, ruled that only English could be spoken at council meetings. This prompted an outcry in the county, as it was apparent that several members were not fluent in the English language. Prior to the second meeting of the council, a caucus meeting of the Liberal councillors was held at which it was decided by thirty votes against nine that Dr Edward Jones of Dolgellau, rather than Pope, should be the permanent chairman.

== See also ==
- List of Chairmen of Merionethshire County Council
- Merionethshire County Council election, 1889
- Merionethshire County Council election, 1892
