= 1889 Brecknockshire County Council election =

1889 Welsh local government election

The first election to Brecknockshire County Council was held in January 1889. It was followed by the 1892 election. The county was divided into numerous single member wards with two or more councillors elected to represent some urban wards.

== Overview of the result ==
Breconshire was the only county in Wales to be captured by the Conservatives.

== Ward results ==
=== Battle (one seat) ===
Battle 1889
Party	Candidate	Votes	%	±%
Conservative	R.D. Cleasby	Unopposed		
Registered electors		187		
Conservative win (new seat)				

=== Brecon St David's (one seat) ===
Brecon St David's 1889
Party	Candidate	Votes	%	±%
Conservative	Rev Rees Price	125		
Liberal	John Morgan	118		
Majority		7		
Turnout		243		
Registered electors		274		
Conservative win (new seat)				

=== Brecon St John's (one seat) ===
Brecon St John's 1889
Party	Candidate	Votes	%	±%
Conservative	John Evans	Unopposed		
Registered electors		199		
Conservative win (new seat)				

=== Brecon St Mary (one seat) ===
Brecon St Mary 1889
Party	Candidate	Votes	%	±%
Conservative	Col. John Morgan	143		
Liberal	Lewis Jones	59		
Majority		84		
Turnout		202		
Registered electors		237		
Conservative win (new seat)				

=== Brecon Struet (one seat) ===
Brecon Struet 1889
Party	Candidate	Votes	%	±%
Liberal	William Games	Unopposed		
Registered electors		105		
Liberal win (new seat)				

=== Brecon Watton (one seat) ===
Brecon Watton 1889
Party	Candidate	Votes	%	±%
Independent	John Prothero	Unopposed		
Registered electors		238		
Independent win (new seat)				

=== Brynmawr Central (one seat) ===
Brynmawr Central 1889
Party	Candidate	Votes	%	±%
Liberal	Basil Jayne	Unopposed		
Registered electors		227		
Liberal win (new seat)				

=== Brynmawr East (one seat) ===
Brynmawr East 1889
Party	Candidate	Votes	%	±%
Liberal	J. Thomas	Unopposed		
Registered electors		304		
Liberal win (new seat)				

=== Brynmawr South (one seat) ===
Brynmawr South 1889
Party	Candidate	Votes	%	±%
Liberal	George Hicks	Unopposed		
Registered electors		241		
Liberal win (new seat)				

=== Brynmawr West (one seat) ===
Brynmawr West 1889
Party	Candidate	Votes	%	±%
Liberal	John J. Lyddon	Unopposed		
Registered electors		243		
Liberal win (new seat)				

=== Builth (one seat) ===
Builth 1889
Party	Candidate	Votes	%	±%
Conservative	John Davies	131		
Liberal	Henry Lloyd	65		
Ind. Conservative	M.G. Howell	16		
Majority		66		
Turnout		212		
Registered electors		234		
Conservative win (new seat)				

=== Cefncoed-y-Cymmer / Vaynor (one seat) ===
Cefncoed-y-Cymmer / Vaynor 1889
Party	Candidate	Votes	%	±%
Unionist	William Thompson Crawshay	Unopposed		
Registered electors		481		
Unionist win (new seat)				

=== Cray (one seat) ===
Cray 1889
Party	Candidate	Votes	%	±%
Conservative	Owen Price	Unopposed		
Registered electors		149		
Conservative win (new seat)				

=== Crickhowell (one seat) ===
Crickhowell 1889
Party	Candidate	Votes	%	±%
Conservative	E.G. Davies	161		
Liberal	Thomas Watkins	68		
Majority		93		
Turnout		229		
Registered electors		269		
Conservative win (new seat)				

=== Cwmdu (one seat) ===
Cwmdu 1889
Party	Candidate	Votes	%	±%
Conservative	Robert Raikes	83		
Liberal	F. Evans	71		
Majority		12		
Turnout		154		
Registered electors		171		
Conservative win (new seat)				

=== Gelly and Duffryn or Vaynor Upper (one seat) ===
Gelly and Duffryn or Vaynor Upper 1889
Party	Candidate	Votes	%	±%
Liberal	Thomas Jones	45		
Conservative	Walter M. North	44		
Majority		1		
Turnout		89		
Registered electors		95		
Liberal win (new seat)				

=== Hay (one seat) ===
Hay 1889
Party	Candidate	Votes	%	±%
Liberal	R.T, Griffiths	Unopposed		
Registered electors		344		
Liberal win (new seat)				

=== Llanafan (one seat) ===
Llanafan 1889
Party	Candidate	Votes	%	±%
Liberal	Rev D.A. Griffiths	126		
Conservative	William C. Mogg	51		
Majority		75		
Turnout		177		
Registered electors		189		
Liberal win (new seat)				

=== Llandefalle (one seat) ===
Llandefalle 1889
Party	Candidate	Votes	%	±%
Liberal	J. Williams Vaughan	265		
Conservative	William Morgan	61		
Majority		204		
Turnout		326		
Registered electors		189		
Liberal win (new seat)				

=== Llanelly, Rural Eastern (one seat) ===
Llanelly, Rural Eastern 1889
Party	Candidate	Votes	%	±%
Liberal	William Turbeville	Unopposed		
Registered electors		194		
Liberal win (new seat)				

=== Llanelly, Rural Western (one seat) ===
Llanelly, Rural Western 1889
Party	Candidate	Votes	%	±%
Liberal	Lewis Pritchard	Unopposed		
Registered electors		325		
Liberal win (new seat)				

=== Llangammarch (one seat) ===
Llangammarch 1889
Party	Candidate	Votes	%	±%
Liberal Unionist	Charles Evan-Thomas	95		
Liberal	Evan Jones	85		
Majority		10		
Turnout		180		
Registered electors		199		
Liberal Unionist win (new seat)				

=== Llangattock (one seat) ===
Llangattock 1889
Party	Candidate	Votes	%	±%
Conservative	Joseph Bailey	77		
Liberal	William Davies	73		
Majority		4		
Turnout		150		
Registered electors		164		
Conservative win (new seat)				

=== Llangynider (one seat) ===
Llangynider 1889
Party	Candidate	Votes	%	±%
Liberal	M.P. Jones	Unopposed		
Registered electors		97		
Liberal win (new seat)				

=== Llanspyddid (one seat) ===
Llanspyddid 1889
Party	Candidate	Votes	%	±%
Conservative	J.W. Morgan	46		
Liberal	William S. Miller	45		
Majority		1		
Turnout		91		
Registered electors		107		
Conservative win (new seat)				

=== Llanwrthwl (one seat) ===
Llanwrthwl 1889
Party	Candidate	Votes	%	±%
Conservative	R.L. Lloyd	Unopposed		
Registered electors		68		
Conservative win (new seat)				

=== Llanwrtyd (one seat) ===
Llanwrtyd 1889
Party	Candidate	Votes	%	±%
Liberal Unionist	Penry Lloyd	Unopposed		
Registered electors		232		
Liberal Unionist win (new seat)				
