= Samuel Pope =

English barrister

Samuel Pope KC JP DL
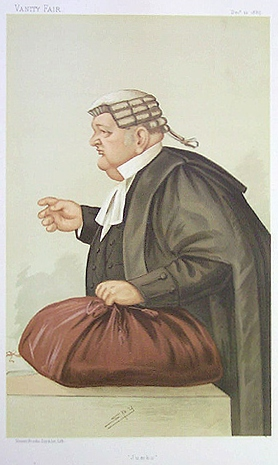

Personal details
- Born: 11 December 1826 Manchester, England
- Died: 22 July 1901 (aged 74) Westminster, London, England

Samuel Pope (11 December 1826 – 22 July 1901) was an English barrister.

Born at Manchester, Pope was eldest son of Samuel Pope, a merchant of London and Manchester, by his wife Phebe, daughter of William Rushton, merchant, of Liverpool. After private education he was employed in business, and in his leisure cultivated in debating societies an aptitude for public speaking. Coming to London, he studied at London University, entered at the Middle Temple on 13 November 1855, and was called to the bar on 7 June 1858.

Deeply interested in politics, he unsuccessfully contested Stoke-upon-Trent as a Liberal in the following year. For a few years he practised with success in his native town, but removed to London in 1865. In the same year, and again in 1868, he unsuccessfully contested Bolton. In 1869 he was however made recorder of the town and took silk. In London he soon devoted himself to parliamentary practice, for which his persuasive eloquence and commanding personality admirably fitted him. He presented complicated facts and figures simply and interestingly and in due perspective. At his death he was the leader of the parliamentary bar.

He was chosen a bencher of his inn on 27 January 1870, and was treasurer in 1888–9, when he made a valuable donation of books to the library. A keen advocate of the temperance cause from youth. Pope was at his death an honorary secretary of the United Kingdom Alliance. He was a freemason, becoming senior grand deacon in grand lodge in 1886. He died at his residence, 74 Ashley Gardens, Westminster, on 22 July 1901, and was buried at Llanbedr in Merionethshire, of which county he was a J. P. and deputy lieutenant. Pope married Hannah, daughter of Thomas Bury of Timperley Lodge, Cheshire; she predeceased him without issue in 1880.
