= CCAN =

CCAN may refer to:

- Cambridgeshire Community Archive Network, a community-based local history network for Cambridgeshire
- Chesapeake Climate Action Network
- Comprehensive C Archive Network, an archive for the C programming language
- Constitutive centromere-associated network, see Centromere protein L
- Nottingham Contemporary art centre (formerly known as Centre for Contemporary Art Nottingham)
