= High Pavement =

Street in Nottingham, England

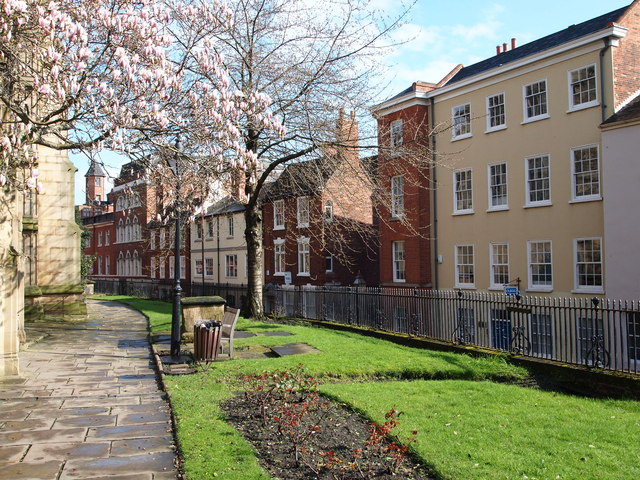
- A view from the church yard

- Location within Nottingham
- Maintained by: Nottingham City Council
- Coordinates: 52.9508°N 1.1444°W

High Pavement is a street in the Lace Market district of the city of Nottingham in Nottinghamshire, England. It is one of the earliest streets in the city, and many of its buildings are listed. It runs east from the Weekday Cross to the east end of the church yard of St Mary's Church. At Weekday Cross, High Pavement meets Middle Pavement, Fletcher Gate and Middle Hill.

== History ==
=== Middle Ages ===
High Pavement runs through what was the original Saxon settlement of Nottingham. St Mary's Church, at its eastern end, predates the Norman Conquest and is mentioned in the Domesday Book. The current church building is believed to be the third such on the site and was itself completed in 1474.

After the Norman Conquest the seat of power moved to Nottingham Castle, on the next hill to the west, and its surrounding French borough, whilst the area around St Mary's Church became known as the English borough. High Pavement, along with Middle Pavement, Low Pavement and Castle Gate, became the principal route between the two. Sheriffs were appointed to keep the peace and collect taxes and they were based on High Pavement at a building that was variously referred to as the Shire Hall, Sheriff's Hall, County Hall or King's Hall. The first written record of the site being used as a law court dates from 1375 and as a prison in 1449.

=== 1500 to 1900 ===
Around 1681 a row of houses was constructed on the south side of St Mary's Churchyard. They existed until they were pulled down around 1792 when the street was widened. A new wall was constructed along the south side of the churchyard. The Shire Hall was rebuilt between 1769 and 1772, with additions and further rebuildings up until 1879. From 1832 to 1865, public executions were held on the steps of the Shire Hall. With the introduction of Nottinghamshire County Council in 1889, the Shire Hall became the headquarters of that body.

The Blue Coat School was located on High Pavement from 1723 to 1853. In the Georgian era, High Pavement was one of the most fashionable places to live in Nottingham. In 1799, the name of a portion of the street between Short Hill and St Mary's Gate was called "St Mary's Church Side", but the name didn't take and was not used after about 1815.

=== Since 1900 ===
A police station was built adjacent the Shire Hall in 1905. In 1931, numbers 15, 17 and 19 were demolished to provide additional car parking for the Shire Hall opposite.

In 1954, Nottinghamshire County Council moved out of Shire Hall to the new County Hall in West Bridgford. The Shire Hall continued to house civil and criminal courts until 1991, when Nottingham Crown Court was opened on Canal Street. The Galleries of Justice Museum opened in the building in 1995. It was refurbished and rebranded as the National Justice Museum in 2017.

== Notable buildings ==
=== North side (west to east) ===
- 1. By the architect William Jolley, 1884 – 1885.
- 3 and 5. Urquhart House. Grade II. Formerly house, then offices, now Lace Museum. Late C18, altered C19, restored 1991.
- 7. The Living Room. A bar by the developer George Fish.
- 9. An C18 house rebuilt as a shop by Watson Fothergill in 1898.
- 11. A house rebuilt by the architect George Attenborough in 1877. Occupied by Renshaw, Shelton and Co in 1832.
- 15 demolished in 1931 to provide a car park for Shire Hall.
- 17 – 19 built by Samuel and Mary Fellows in 1731. The poet Henry Kirke White lived in No. 17. Both properties were demolished in 1931 to provide a car park for Shire Hall.
- 23. County House. Grade II. Site once occupied by a house owned by Thomas Hutchinson (MP) and the house was for a time known as Lady Hutchinson's House. The current building is a town house, now office. C16, refronted 1728 – 1733 for William Hallowes. Altered 1742. Purchased by the County Magistrates in 1832. Remodelled and right wing added 1833, during conversion to Judges' Lodging, by Henry Moses Wood and John Nicholson. For a brief period until 1922 it was lived in by Princess Louise, Duchess of Argyll. Converted to County Council offices 1922, with additions 1930 and 1949. It housed the Nottinghamshire County Record Office from 1966 to 1992

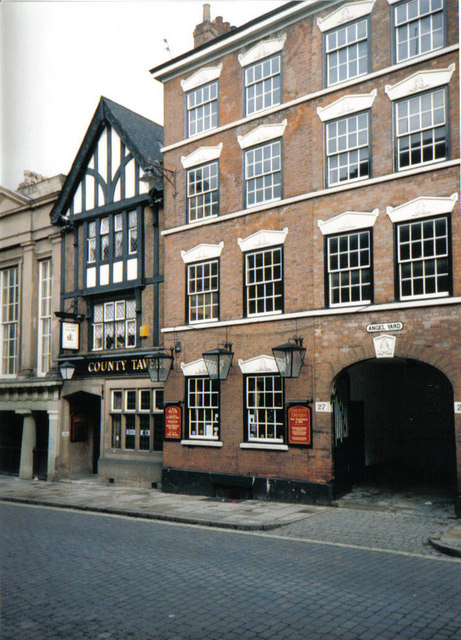
County Tavern in 1991

- 27. Grade II. The Cock and Hoop public house, formerly house occupied by Joseph Pearson in 1832 and then from ca.1840 to ca.2000 the County Tavern public house. Early and mid C19. It was rebuilt by Basil Baily and Albert Edgard Eberlin in 1933.
- 29. Grade II. The Lace Market Hotel. Previously on this site was Bugge Hall and then The Angel or Old Angel public house. Current building was formerly house built in 1820 for Booth Edison, noted surgeon, then converted to offices. Used as the City Council Medical Officer's Department in 1929. Late C18, altered mid C19.
- 31. Grade II. The Lace Market Hotel. Formerly house, then offices. Early C19.

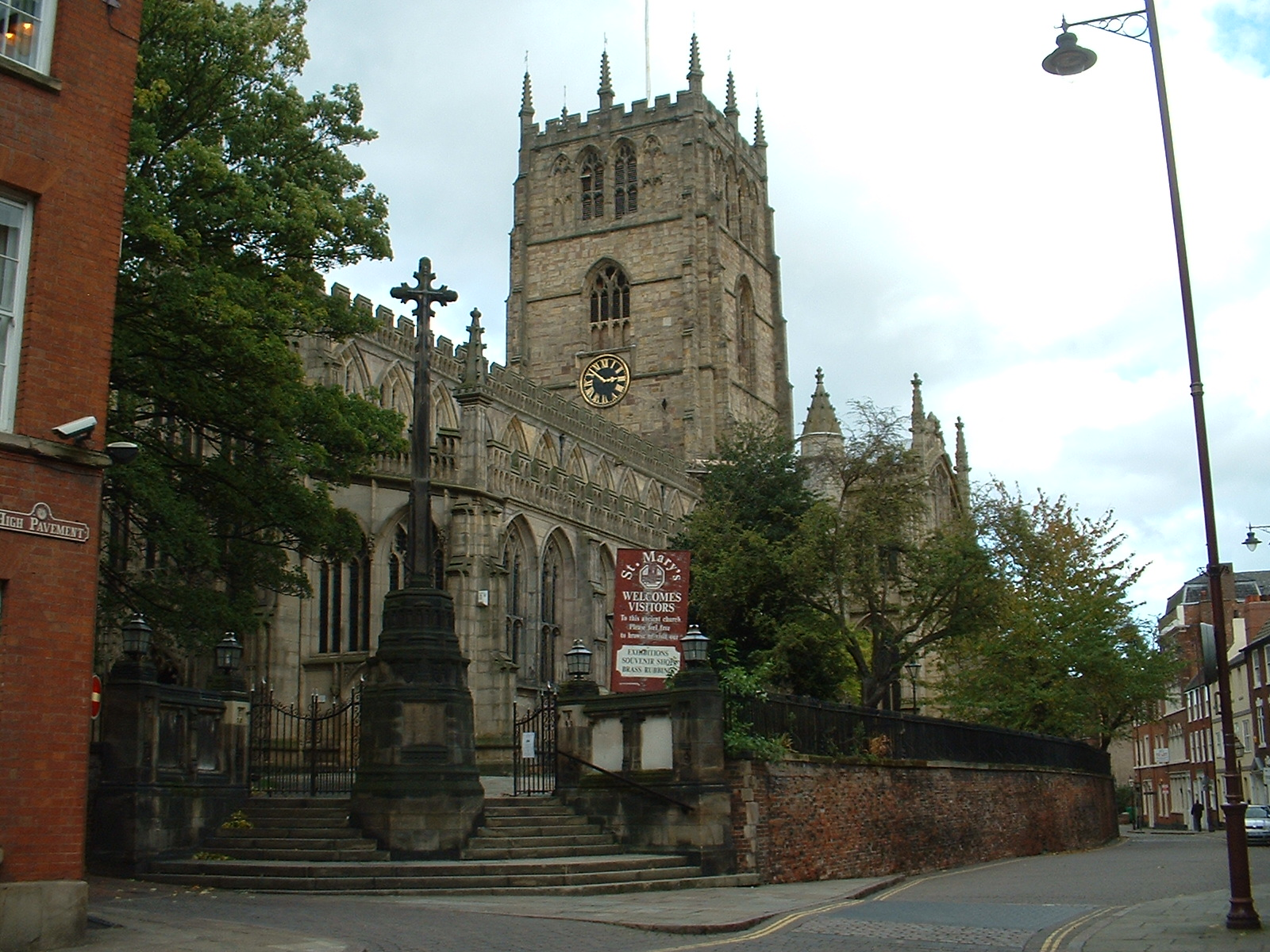
St Mary's Church, Nottingham

- County War Memorial, Nottingham
- St Mary's Church, Nottingham

=== South side (west to east) ===
- Nottingham Contemporary by London architects Caruso St John 2009.

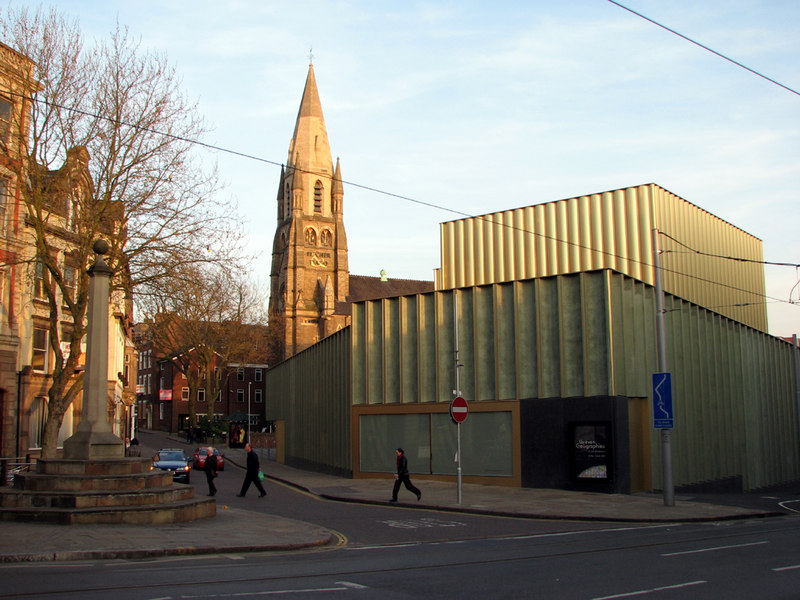
Nottingham Contemporary

- High Pavement Chapel (now Pitcher and Piano public house). Grade II Unitarian chapel, then lace industry museum and exhibition centre. 1876. By Stuart Colman of Bristol. Converted 1989.
- Behind High Pavement Chapel is High Pavement School founded in 1788, with alterations in 1846, 1874 and 1881. The building is now used as offices.
- 14. Grade II. Mid C18, altered late C19.

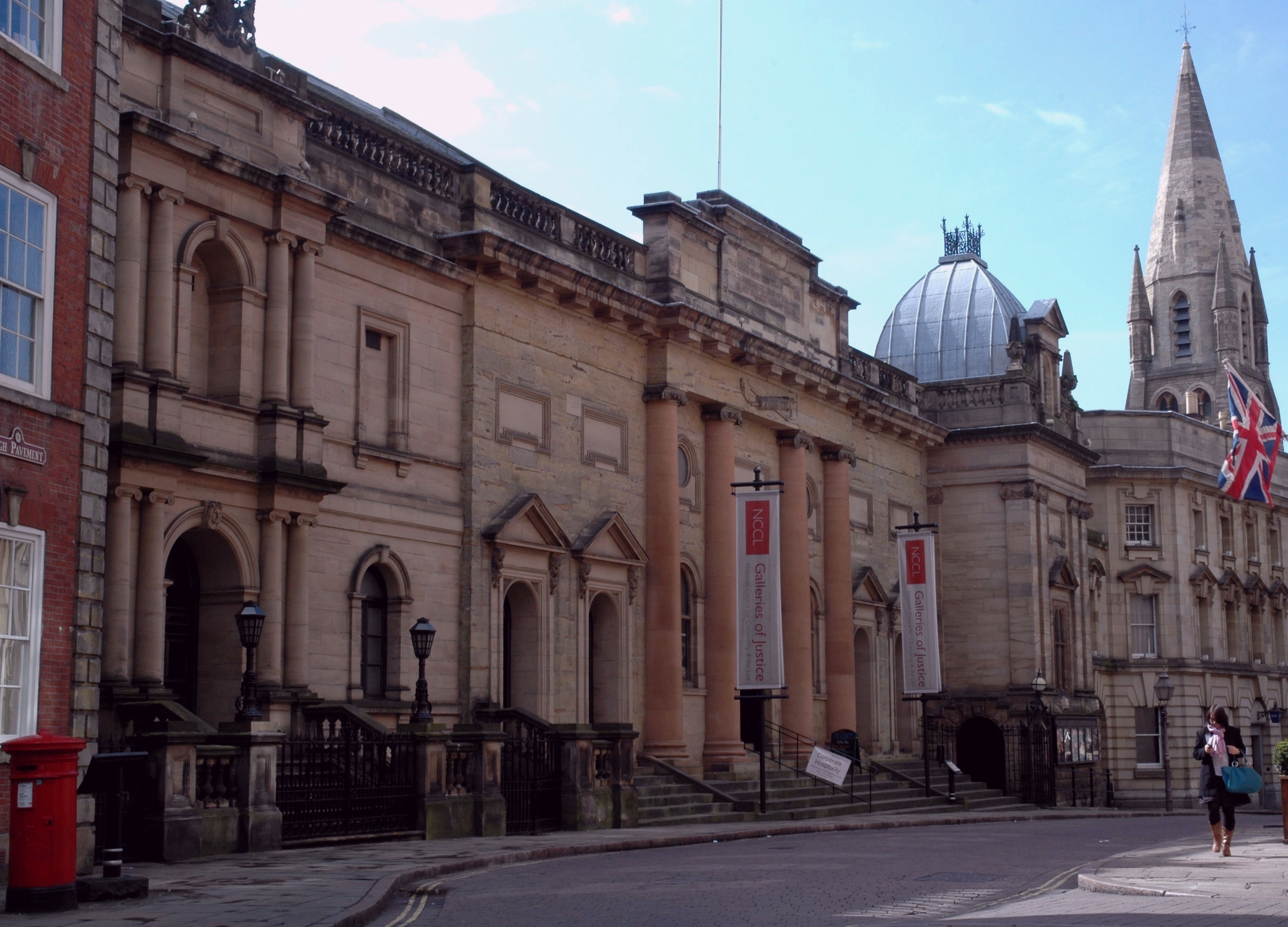
National Justice Museum in the Lace Market

- Former Police Station adjoining Shire Hall Grade II* Police station, now offices. 1905.
- National Justice Museum, formerly Shire Hall and adjoining county gaol Grade II*. Designed 1769 – 1770 by James Gandon and built 1770 – 1772 by Joseph Pickford of Derby. Eastern addition 1875 – 1876 by William Bliss Sanders. Remodelled and extended to the west 1876 – 1879 by Thomas Chambers Hine, following a fire.
- 26 and 28. Trinity House. Grade II. Built for John Pearson. Mid and late C18, restored late C20. Site of the house of the Trinity Guild of St Mary's Church.
- 30, 34, 36. Grade II. 5 houses, now cafe and offices. Late C18, altered C19, restored late C20.
- 38. Grade II. Town houses, formerly Ranby's Cafe, now the Hungry Pumpkin cafe. Late C18 and early C19, restored and altered late C20.
- 40. Grade II. Town houses, now offices. Late C18 and early C19, restored and altered late C20.
- 42. Bishop's House. Grade II. Warehouse, now offices. Early C19 and mid C19, restored and converted late C20.
- 44. Grade II. House, now workrooms. Early C18, altered mid and late C19, restored late C20.
- 46 and 48. Grade II. House, now offices. Late C18, altered mid C19 and mid C20.
- 50 and 52. Grade II. House, now offices. Late C18, altered mid C19.
- 54. Grade II. Possibly Town house, then offices. Mid C18, altered mid and late C19. However arguably not a town house given the scale and layout across six storeys partly underground; conceivably erected specifically for commercial use in the lace or textile trade. There is machinery in the cellars and a hoist for the carriage of goods in the loft area with trapdoors evident below. More recently used as accountant's offices for Prior & Palmer in conjunction with the No.56 building but internally many alterations have erased much of the interior including no sign of the original staircase. Whilst the loft area is broadly in close to original state (with exposed reed walls, blue distemper surfaces and original floors) the other storeys have been remodelled and with only small areas of detail, such as coving, evident behind suspended ceilings. Repaired in recent years and used as offices and, with No.56 next door, in November 2007 was renamed formally as Lace Market House and developed as a business centre serving the newly evolving Nottingham Creative Quarter. Closed down (December 2017) pending conversion as part of a larger residential development scheme. Access to the rear is via a side gate which opens into a very small courtyard area which mainly serves the neighbouring buildings. From there can be seen some iron steps and below there some lower storeys. The front of No.54 has cellars carved from the sandstone which were used in part for the storage of coal; the architecture in this area only one floor below is curious in retaining evidence of a different layout to that currently including a redundant stone lintel. There are bricked up areas that appear not to have been recently explored but to the rear extensive work has taken place to create additional space with evidence of further unexplored spaces below.

THIS SECTION NOT UPDATED SINCE 2017.

- 56. Grade II. Former Rectory to St Mary's Church opposite, for a time called Washington House, then offices. Mid C18, altered mid and late C19. It was erected by John Whitlock and William Reynolds. At one point, Washington House served as vicarage to Nathan Haines, then vicar of St Mary's Church. Haines presided over a parish of roughly 45,000, and it was during his time at Washington House that relations between the Anglican and dissenting populations broke down, it is said to the point that in 1799 shots were fired through the bedroom window while Haines and his wife slept inside. In 1808 a Dr. Bristow, presumably the owner, sued the widow of the former vicar Nathan Haines for not keeping the vicarage in good repair. With the £70 proceeds, (equivalent to £5,347 in 2025), he remodelled the front and the interior. Current building is Mid C18, altered mid and late C19. The clergy were subsequently transferred across the city to the Standard Hill area alongside the current Nottingham Castle gatehouse. Washington House was occupied after the First World War as a Public Assistance Office and damaged in air raids in the Second World War during the 1941 Nottingham Blitz. More recently used as accountant's offices (Prior & Palmer, then Cooper Parry Prior & Palmer, latterly PKF Cooper Parry) and at some point knocked through and joined with No. 54 High Pavement. The whole site (including the adjacent properties on Shorthill and the main Trivett factory building, was sold and in November 2007, then No. 54 and No.56 were renamed formally as Lace Market House during the development by local businessman, Nicholas Max, as a business centre serving the newly evolving Nottingham Creative Quarter. It was closed down some ten years later (December 2017) pending conversion as part of a larger residential development scheme and sold to new developers (Abode (Nottingham) Ltd) later that year. There is a simple cave system underneath comprising a passageway and bricked up alcoves leading to a chamber close to the cliff edge to the south. The chamber is fitted with brick built bins but mainly filled with building rubble which is likely to have arisen from the demolition some time ago of the properties above, being a row of houses fronting the ancient street called Mailn Hill. The whole flattened area was used for parking by Lace Market House but now stands empty awaiting redevelopment. The main listed building despite many internal alterations has a good main staircase plus side stairs and various areas where original coving etc. remains. There are two good plaster relief ceiling roses in the main area and some Georgian wooden cupboards of note in a private office. A substantial rear extension comprising a meeting hall and upper rooms dating from Victorian times may have been used for parish council or ecclesiastical purposes and shows evidence to the rear of a separate entrance. The ground floor hall was used part-time by a religious group, the Apostolic Fellowship of Christ, which held services on Wednesdays and Sundays until its closure pre-development. Unfortunately this rear section of the building is, despite objections, scheduled to be demolished as part of the development plans approved by the council in recent years.

THIS SECTION NOT UPDATED SINCE 2017.
