= Mansfield stone =

- Sandstone rock
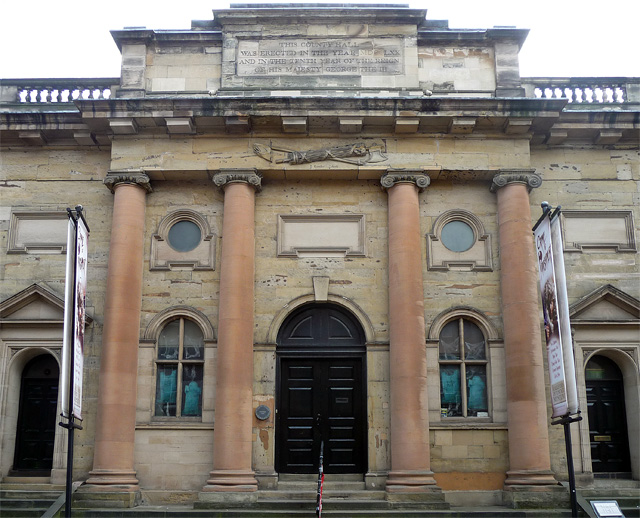
- Red Mansfield stone used for columns of the National Justice Museum, Nottingham

Composition
- Quartz, Dolomite, Calcium carbonate, Silica

Mansfield stone is a variety of building stone quarried in Mansfield, Nottinghamshire, England. Geologically, it is a sandy dolomitic limestone (or calcareous sandstone) belonging to the Cadeby Formation (formerly Lower Magnesian Limestone). It is a fine-grained, even-grained freestone which exhibits current bedding.

The Mansfield stones are the only building stones produced in Nottinghamshire to have achieved "national status" in terms of their geographical distribution and usage.

== Composition and varieties ==
The stone belongs to the Cadeby Formation of the Permian Zechstein Group. It is a dolomitic limestone with a high quartz sand content (up to 50%), which makes it particularly durable. The stone is commonly cross-cut by greenish-grey clay seams. Because it is easily worked, it was historically favoured for decorative carving. It is distinct from the stone quarried at Mansfield Woodhouse, which is a dolomitic limestone lacking the high sand content.

The stone was traditionally supplied in two varieties:

- Mansfield Red: A red sandy dolomitic limestone which was extremely popular with architects during the 19th century. In 1829, Adam Sedgwick described it as "dull red" and noted it could be easily mistaken for New Red Sandstone. It is now considered "long worked out".
- Mansfield White (or Yellow): A yellowish-white variety that weathers to white. It was quarried until relatively recently, with the White Mansfield (or Gregory) Quarry remaining active into the early 21st century.

== History and quarrying ==
The earliest geological descriptions date to the early 19th century. An 1856 survey listed three quarries in operation, owned by Charles Lindley, with the Red stone costing 9d per cubic foot. By 1861, quarries were operating at Chesterfield Road, Rock Valley, and West Hill; the architect George Gilbert Scott described the material as "one of the best building stones in the kingdom".

By 1930, the Rock Valley quarries were disused, leaving Lindley's White Mansfield quarry as the major producer.

== Use in architecture ==
Both the Red and White varieties have been used extensively as block stone for construction, often outside of their local area.

=== Red Mansfield ===
This variety was particularly favored by the Nottingham architect Watson Fothergill for his 19th-century city centre buildings, and it was often used for decorative columns in Victorian villas in the area.

- Midland Grand Hotel (St Pancras), London: The stone was used for the capitals and piers alongside Shap granite columns. The hotel was designed as a "showpiece" for the Midland Railway, utilizing stone from quarries along its route.
- Shire Hall, Nottingham: The 18th-century frontage is flanked by imposing half-columns of the stone.
- Kelham Hall, near Newark: Used for decorative work.
- Albert Memorial, London: Used as part of the pavement.
- Trafalgar Square, London: Originally used for the terrace paving.
- Castle Brewery, Newark: Used for the quoins.

=== White Mansfield ===
- Mansfield: The Town Hall and the railway viaduct are constructed of the white stone.
- Newark: The 18th-century Town Hall.
- Southwell Minster, Nottinghamshire: The minster (dating to the 12th century) is largely built of Mansfield White alongside imported Bolsover stone. The carved capitals of the 13th-century Chapter House are a notable example of the stone's suitability for decorative work. Modern quarries provided stone for the new visitor centre.
- Bolsover Castle, Derbyshire: The Keep (1612–1621) is an "unrivalled example" of the stone's use.
- Palace of Westminster, London: Although Anston stone was the primary material used, Mansfield White was one of the stones selected for the construction in 1839 (Dimes claims the use of Mansfield Woodhouse).
- Municipal Buildings, Windsor, Berkshire (1852).

== Sources ==
- Dimes, Francis G. (1998). "Sedimentary Rocks". In Ashurst, John; Dimes, Francis G. (eds.). Conservation of Building and Decorative Stone. London: Butterworth-Heinemann. pp. 61–134. doi:10.4324/9780080502908. ISBN 978-0-7506-3898-2.
- Lott, Graham (2001). "Geology and building stones in the East Midlands" (PDF). Mercian Geologist. 15 (2): 97–122.
- Parry, Stephen; Lott, Graham (April 2013). A Building Stone Atlas of Nottinghamshire (PDF). Strategic Stone Study. British Geological Survey / English Heritage.
