= County House, Nottingham =

Listed building in Nottingham, England

Coordinates: 52°57′3.6″N 1°8′40.2″W

County House
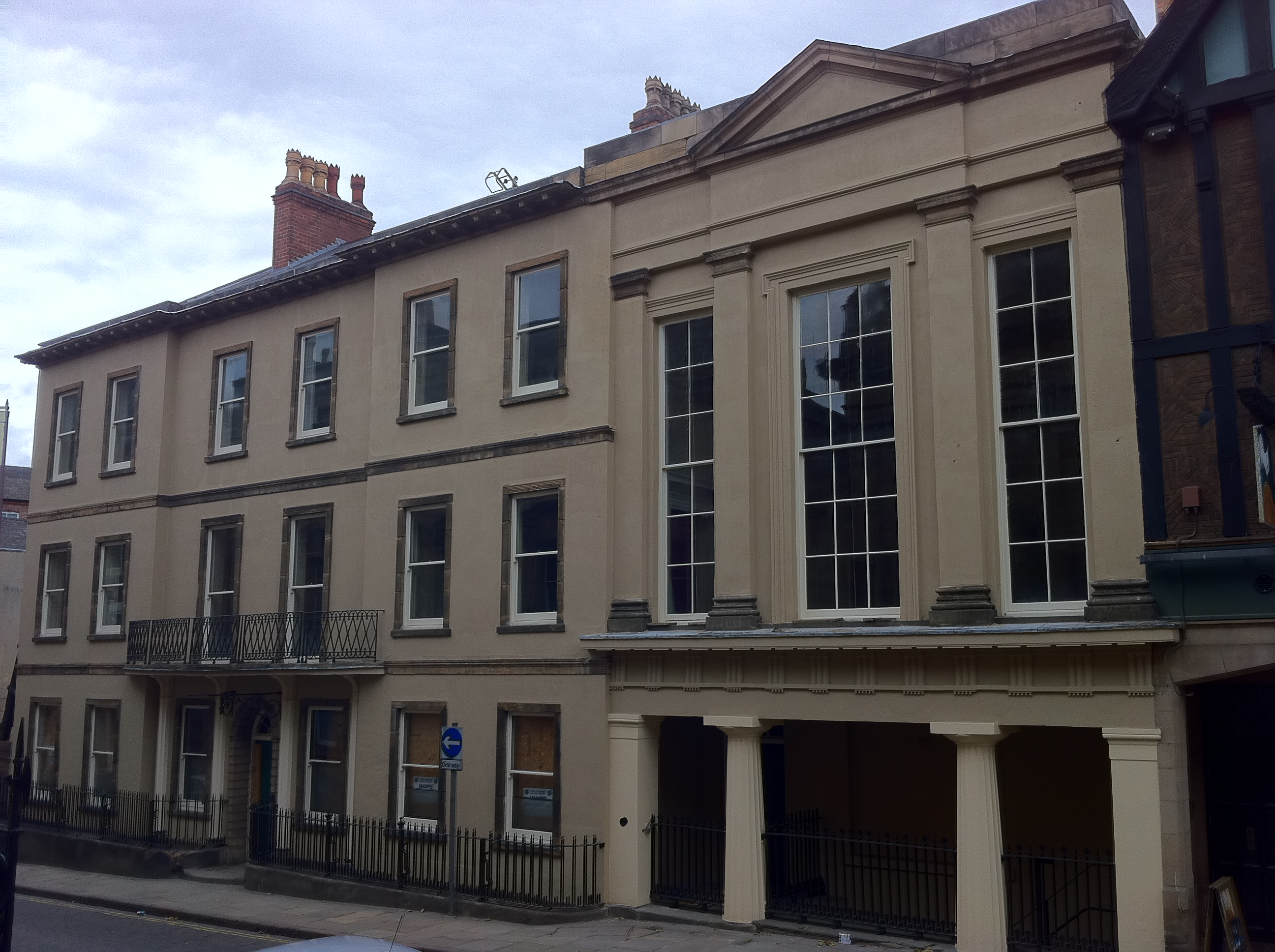

- Location within Nottingham

General information
- Location: High Pavement, Nottingham, England
- Year built: 16th century
- Renovated: 1728–33 (rebuilt); 1742 (altered); 1833 (remodelled and extended); 1922 (converted); 1930 and 1949 (extended)

Listed Building – Grade II*
- Official name: County House
- Designated: 11 August 1952
- Reference no.: 1270805

County House is a Grade II* listed building at 23 High Pavement in Nottingham, England.

== History ==
A house has existed on this site since at least the 16th century and parts of the house date from that time. In 1646 it was owned by Thomas Hutchinson (MP) and occupied by Lady Hutchinson, mother of Colonel Hutchinson.

The front was reconstructed in 1728–33 for William Hallowes. Alterations were made in 1742, and it was again remodelled in 1833 when it was converted into the Judges' lodging by the architects Henry Moses Wood and John Nicholson.

For a brief period in 1887 it was lived in by Princess Louise, Duchess of Argyll. The lodgings had to be specially furnished for her stay at the expense of the Mayor of Nottingham.

In 1922 it was then converted to County Council offices, with additions in 1930. Two adjacent properties, 17 and 19, were demolished in 1931 to provide car parking for the court opposite. There were further additions to County House in 1949.

It housed the Nottinghamshire County Record Office from 1966 to 1992. It was designated a Grade II* listed building in 1972.

In 2009 it was bought by Finesse Collection, the owners of the Lace Market Hotel but the extension of the hotel did not proceed, and it was put into the hands of receivers after a legal dispute. In 2014 it was up for sale again.

In 2018 proposals were made to transform the building into a bar, restaurant, offices, and apartments, but the plans were never realised, leaving the future of County House uncertain. As of 2024, the building was vacant and in need of repairs.

== See also ==
- Grade II* listed buildings in Nottinghamshire
- Listed buildings in Nottingham (Bridge ward)
