= Middle Pavement =

Street in Nottingham, England

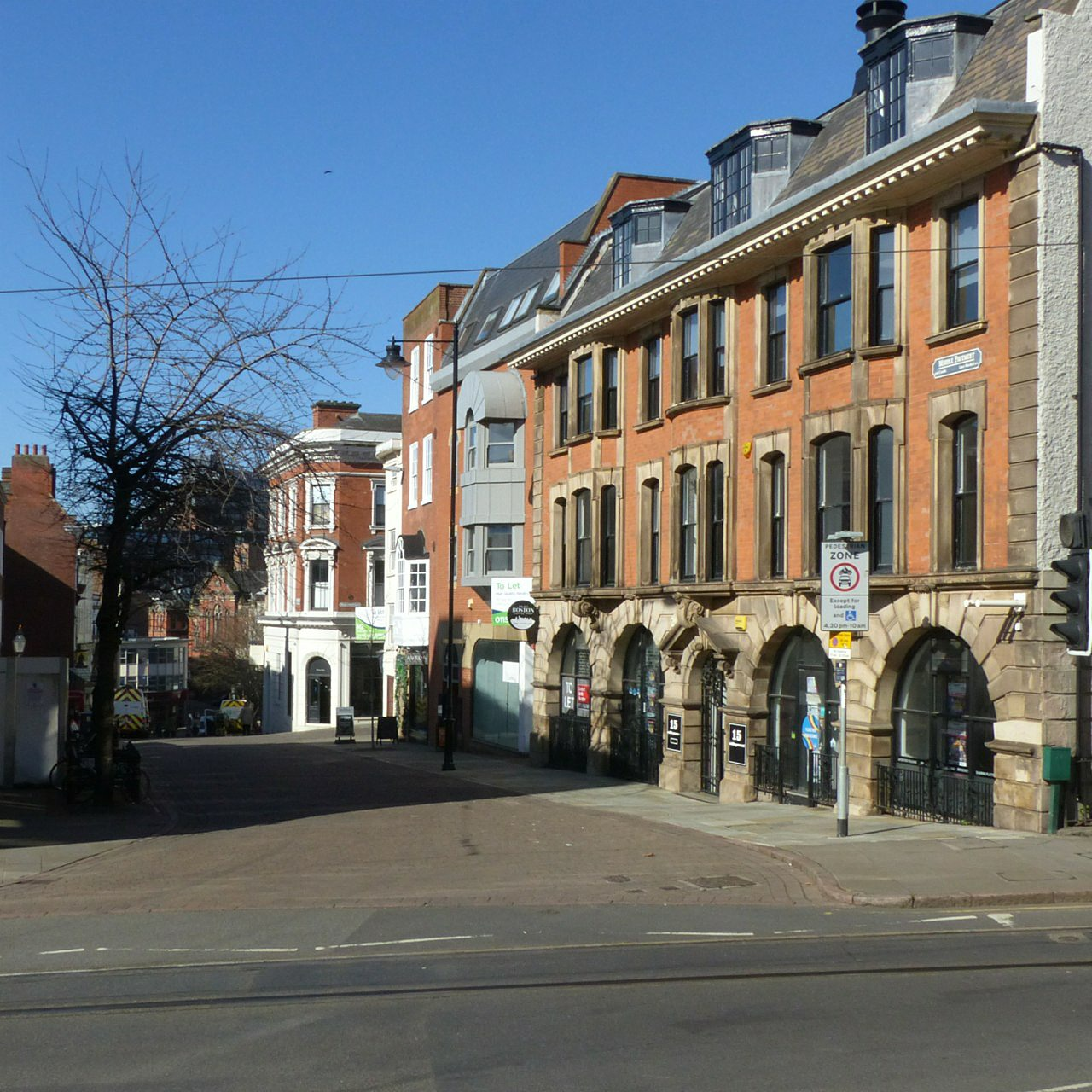
- Middle Pavement

- Location within Nottingham
- Maintained by: Nottingham City Council
- Coordinates: 52.9515°N 1.1466°W

Middle Pavement is a street located in the English city of Nottingham. At its eastern end it connects, via Weekday Cross, with High Pavement, Fletcher Gate and Middle Hill. At its western end it connects to Bridlesmith Gate and Low Pavement. Along with High Pavement, Low Pavement and Castle Gate, it was part of the main route between the English and French boroughs of mediaeval Nottingham.

Middle Pavement also formed the uphill end of the old Drury Hill, and in 1819 a gas lamp was installed at the top of Drury Hill by the Nottingham Gas Light and Coke Company. Previous lighting had been by whale oil lamps.

For a period after the destruction of Drury Hill during the construction of the Broadmarsh Centre, Middle Pavement had an entry to that shopping centre. Since the Broadmarsh Centre has, in turn, been demolished, it is unclear what will replace this.

== Notable buildings and sites ==
Name	Image	Notes	More
1, Middle Pavement		Late 18th century town house, with 19th and 20th century alterations and now used as shop and offices. Grade II listed.	
10, Middle Pavement		The original site of the Severn's Building, a 15th-century merchant's house. The building was relocated to the junction of Castle Gate and Castle Road to make way for an entrance to the Broadmarsh Centre. The site is now vacant, following the demolition of that centre.	
15, Middle Pavement		Shops and offices dating from c.1900 and restored in the late 20th century. Grade II listed.	
51, Bridlesmith Gate		Early 19th century house and shop on the corner of Middle Pavement and Bridlesmith Gate. Grade II listed.	
