= Lace Market Theatre =

Amateur theatre in Nottingham

Coordinates: 52.9516°N 1.1449°W

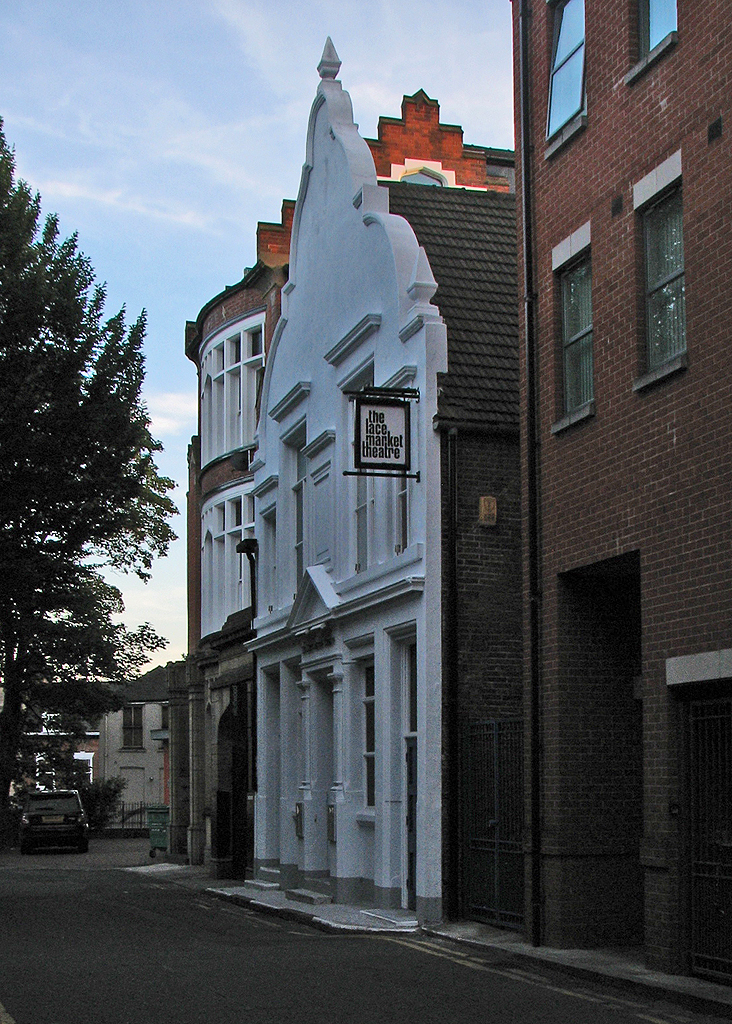
- Interactive map of Lace Market Theatre
- Address: Halifax Place; Nottingham, NG1 1QN
- Owner: The Lace Market Theatre Trust Ltd
- Capacity: 118-seat auditorium, 50-seat studio
- Type: Amateur Theatre
- Designation: Grade II-listed building

Construction
- Opened: 1972
- Rebuilt: 1984 (extension)

Website
- The Lace Market Theatre

The Lace Market Theatre is a small, independent amateur theatre in the Lace Market area of Nottingham city centre.

== History ==
=== Origins: 1920s to 1951 ===
The Lace Market Theatre developed from two amateur dramatic societies founded in Nottingham in the 1920s: the Nottingham Playgoers Club (1922) and the Nottingham Philodramatic Society (1926). These societies amalgamated in 1946 to become the Nottingham Theatre Club, which was based at the Nottingham Bluecoat School until 1951.

=== Hutchison Street: 1951 to 1972 ===
In 1951, the Nottingham Theatre Club moved to leased premises in Hutchinson Street, much closer to Nottingham city centre. It remained there until 1972, when it left as part of the major slum clearance and redevelopment of the city during that decade. At this point, members raised the money to purchase a dilapidated paint store in Halifax Place in the Lace Market area of the city.

=== Halifax Place: 1972 to date ===
The paint store was originally built as a chapel in 1761. It later became a school, where William Booth (founder of the Salvation Army) was a pupil. The building is now Grade II-listed.

Tight funds meant the majority of renovation works were carried out by the Club’s members themselves. The result, achieved within a year, was a 118-seat auditorium with space in the upstairs bar for studio performances to smaller audiences. The Club's objective (which remains to this day) was to stage plays that were challenging for the actors and technical crews, and which people would otherwise have had to travel to London to see.

'Training by doing' has always been a part of the Club’s ethos. Small-scale productions were regularly staged in the bar area so that first-time directors could cut their teeth. These productions were known as ‘Fents’ — an homage to the textile-making history of the Lace Market area.

In 1977, the opportunity arose for the Club to acquire more land. To facilitate the raising of funds, the Lace Market Theatre Trust Ltd was formed. £40,000 was initially raised for a three-storey extension at the rear of the building; and a further £40,000 was raised for its completion in 1984. The building was owned by the Trust and leased to the Club.

While the Club continued to stage challenging pieces, the Trust pursued charitable and educational aims by giving grants to students who were going on to study at drama school.

By 2000, the Club’s wardrobe had moved into rented premises, firstly in St. Mary's Gate and then Stoney Street. In 2003, the Club merged into the Trust, a registered charity.

== Patrons ==
Shortly after the completion of the extension in 1984, Prunella Scales and Timothy West became patrons of the theatre. In 2012, Matthew Macfadyen and Keeley Hawes also became patrons. Joyce Redman was a patron for many years until her death in 2012.

== Links with German theatres ==
The Lace Market Theatre has been twinned with the Jakobus Theatre and Die Kaeuze in Germany since 1982.

== Youth Theatre ==
The Theatre also boast an impressive youth theatre developing and honing new talent across Nottingham. More recently it has put on Youth productions of Macbeth and The Resistible Rise of Arturo Ui.

== See also ==
- Listed buildings in Nottingham (Bridge ward)
