= Henry Moses Wood =

Architect based in Nottingham

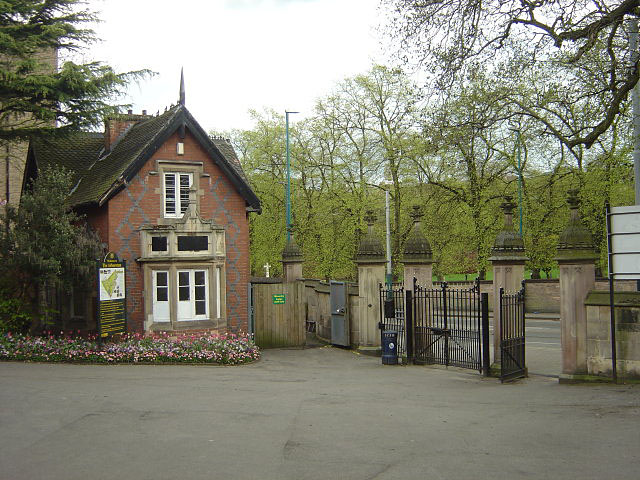
Lodge, Nottingham Arboretum 1851

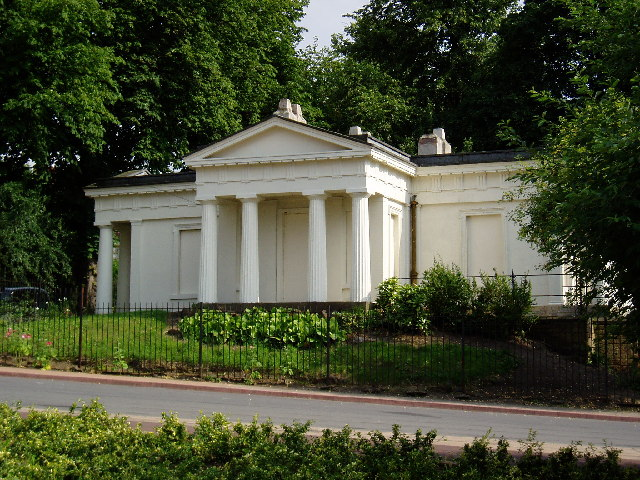
Lodge, Forest Recreation Ground, Mansfield Road. Built in 1857 as the Lodge to the racecourse

Henry Moses Wood (1788–28 September 1867) was an architect based in Nottingham.

== Career ==
He studied in the practice of Edward Staveley, and continued the business after Staveley's death in 1837. One of his pupils, William Booker established himself as an architect and surveyor in Nottingham.

In 1831, jointly with Edward Staveley, he produced a detailed plan and map of Nottingham and its suburbs.

In 1835-1836 he was Sheriff of Nottingham.

He was manager of the Nottinghamshire and Derbyshire Fire and Life Assurance Company. His son succeeded him in this business.

In 1811, he married a Miss Wilson of Shelford Manor and they had 11 children.

He died in Buxton, Derbyshire on 28 September 1867. His son, Henry Walter Wood, continued his practice in Nottingham after his death. His other son, Arthur Augustus Wood, was a playwright.

== Buildings and work ==
- St. Peter's Church, Radford 1812
- Denton House (Denton Manor), Grantham, Lincolnshire 1815 (enlargement) (demolished 1939)
- St Matthew's Church, Darley Abbey, Derbyshire 1819
- Parsonage, Sawley, Derbyshire 1822-24
- Parsonage, Radcliffe on Trent, Nottinghamshire 1827
- Parsonage, Clifton, Nottinghamshire, 1830 (enlarged)
- The Grange, Bramcote, Nottinghamshire 1830
- Collin's Almshouses, Carrington Street, Nottingham 1831 (demolished 1954)
- County Gaol, High Pavement, Nottingham 1832-33
- County House, High Pavement, Nottingham 1833 (remodelling)
- The Old Rectory, Colston Bassett 1834
- Carrington Street bridge over the Nottingham Canal, Nottingham 1842
- Labray's Hospital, Derby Road, Nottingham 1844 (demolished)
- Post Office, St. Peter's Church side, Albert Street, Nottingham 1848 (demolished 1929)
- Public baths and washhouse, Gedling Street, Nottingham 1848
- Lodge at south west entrance to Nottingham Arboretum 1851
- Pedestrian Subway under Addison street 1851-52
- Forest Lodge, Nottingham Racecourse, Mansfield Road, Nottingham 1857
