= Royale Belge =

Functionalist building in Brussels, Belgium

Royale Belge (Axa)
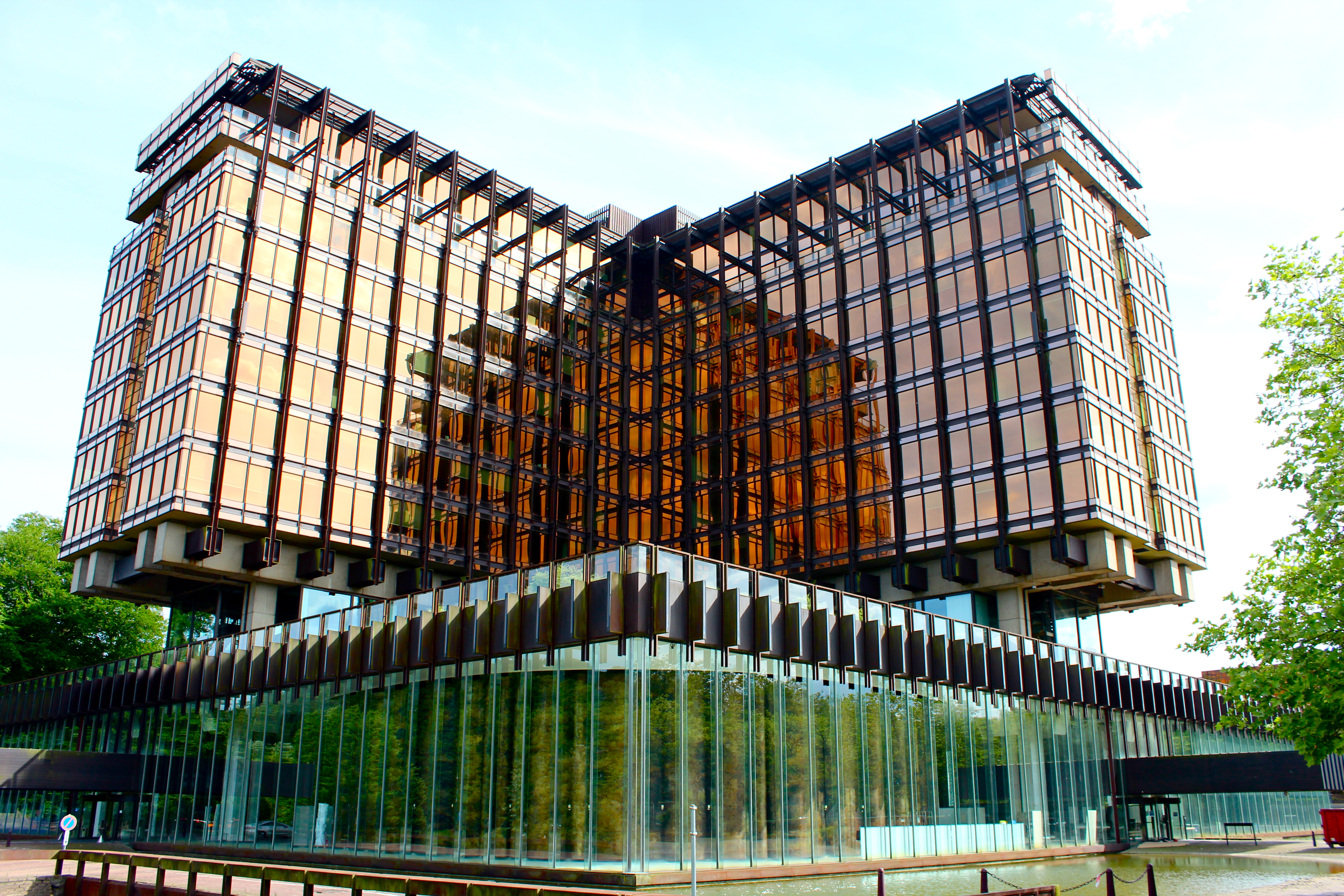
- View of the Royale Belge building
- Interactive map of the Royale Belge (Axa) area

General information
- Architectural style: Functionalism
- Location: Boulevard du Souverain / Vorstlaan 23, 1170 Watermael-Boitsfort, Brussels-Capital Region, Belgium
- Coordinates: 50.8016759°N 4.4250841°E
- Construction started: 4 April 1967
- Completed: 25 June 1970
- Renovated: 2021
- Owner: Souverain 25

Height
- Height: 50.8 m (167 ft)

Technical details
- Floor area: 54,000 m^{2} (580,000 sq ft)

Renovating team
- Renovating firm: DDS.plus

The Royale Belge former headquarters is a functionalist building, built 1967–1970, located in Watermael-Boitsfort, a municipality of Brussels, Belgium.

== History ==
Construction began on 4 April 1967, followed by formal inauguration on 25 June 1970. The client was the insurer Royale Belge. After it was merged into the French AXA in 1999, the complex was sold to Cofinimmo and leased back until 2018. AXA moved its Belgian headquarters to the Place du Trône/Troonplein (former Electrabel headquarters) in 2017. The United States became the new owner of the buildings on the Boulevard du Souverain/Vorstlaan, with the intention of housing the US Embassy. However, the structure proved unsuitable for supporting heavy bulletproof glass. To avoid drastic transformations, the Brussels-Capital Region's government placed the building on its safeguarding list, after which the Americans abandoned the project.

Completed in June 2023, major renovation works transformed the Royale Belge into a mixed-use complex comprising offices, a food court, as well as a hotel, a spa, a fitness centre, and coworking and conference spaces. This project was carried out by the British architectural firm Caruso St John, the Antwerp-based Bovenbouw architectuur, DDS+, Francis Metzger (Ma² office), and Atelier Eole, responsible for the landscape. In 2024, this sustainable and energy-efficient restoration was awarded the Europa Nostra Award 2024, a prize awarded by the European Commission for 22 years, as well as two MIPIM Awards (International Market of Real Estate Professionals) for "Best Redevelopment Project" and "Best Mixed-Use Project". The building was acquired by the Swiss insurance group Bâloise in 2022 for an estimated sum of €160 million.

== Description ==
The cross-shaped design is by the architects René Stapels and Pierre Dufau, who were inspired, among other things, by Eero Saarinen's John Deere World Headquarters (Moline, Illinois). The building is 50.8 metres (167 ft) high and has a floor space of 54,000 square metres (580,000 sq ft). The exterior consists of corten steel and bronze-colored smoke-colored windows. Thanks to the landscape architects Jean Delogne and Claude Rebold, the whole is harmoniously planted between ponds and greenery.

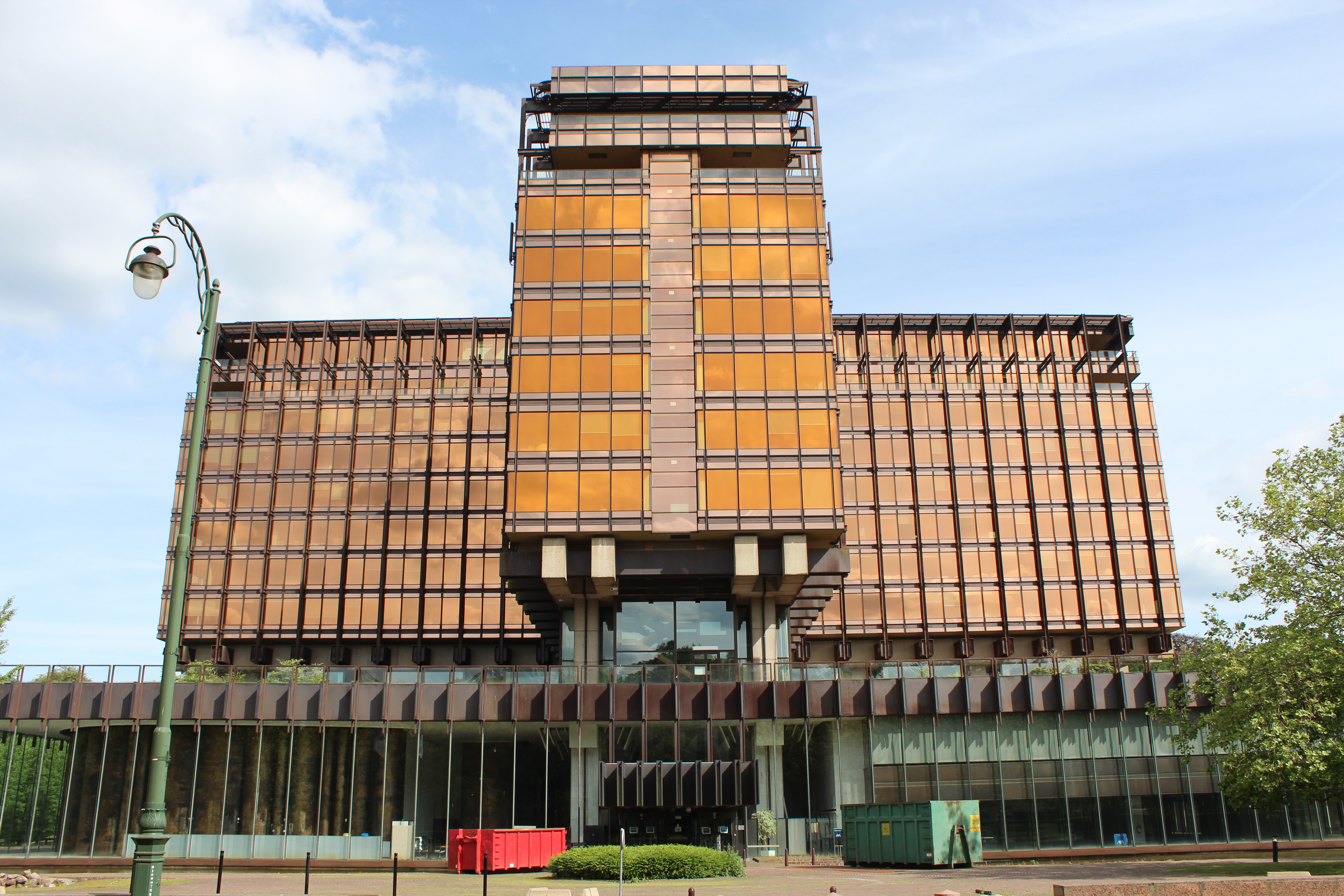
Frontal view

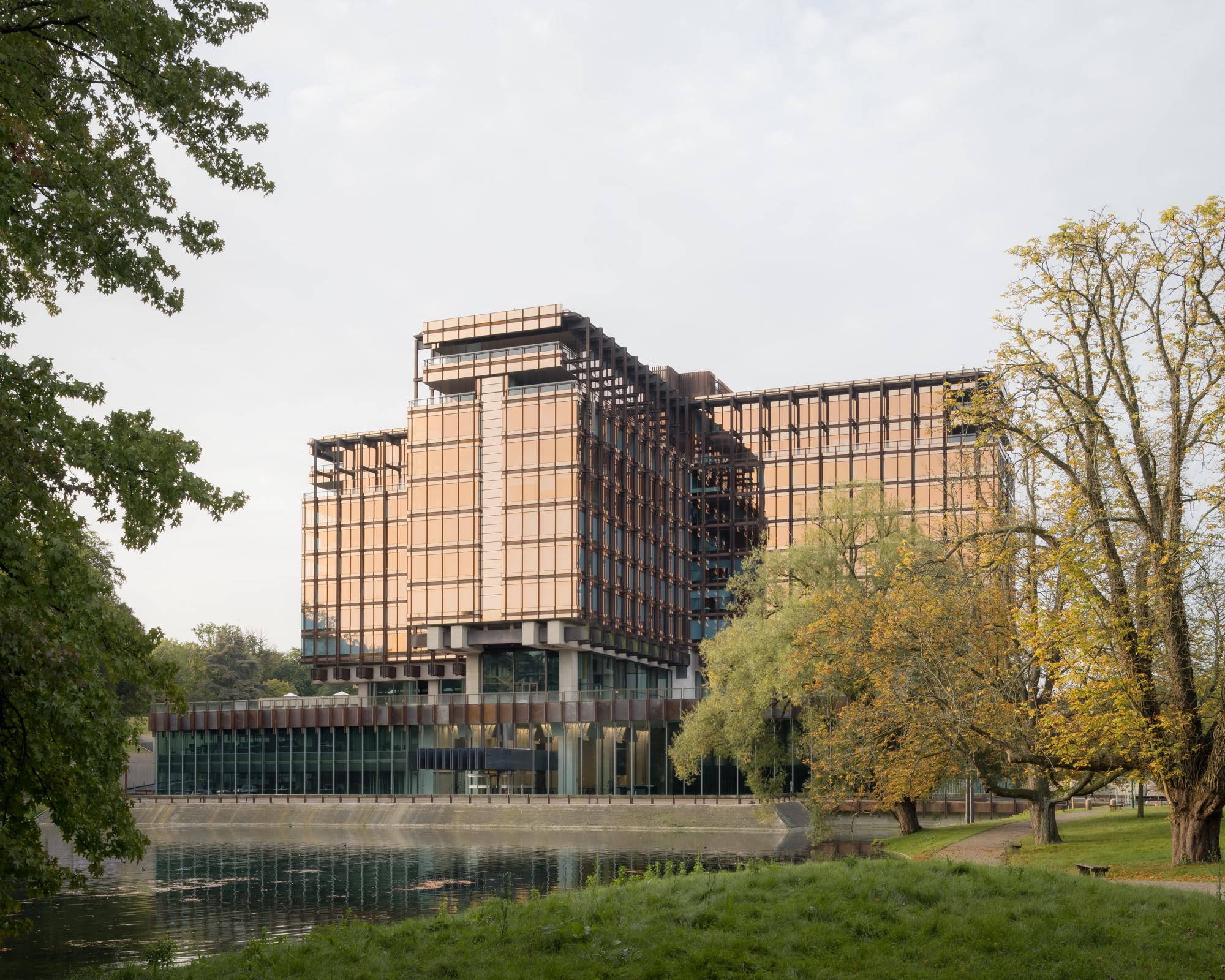
View from across the pond

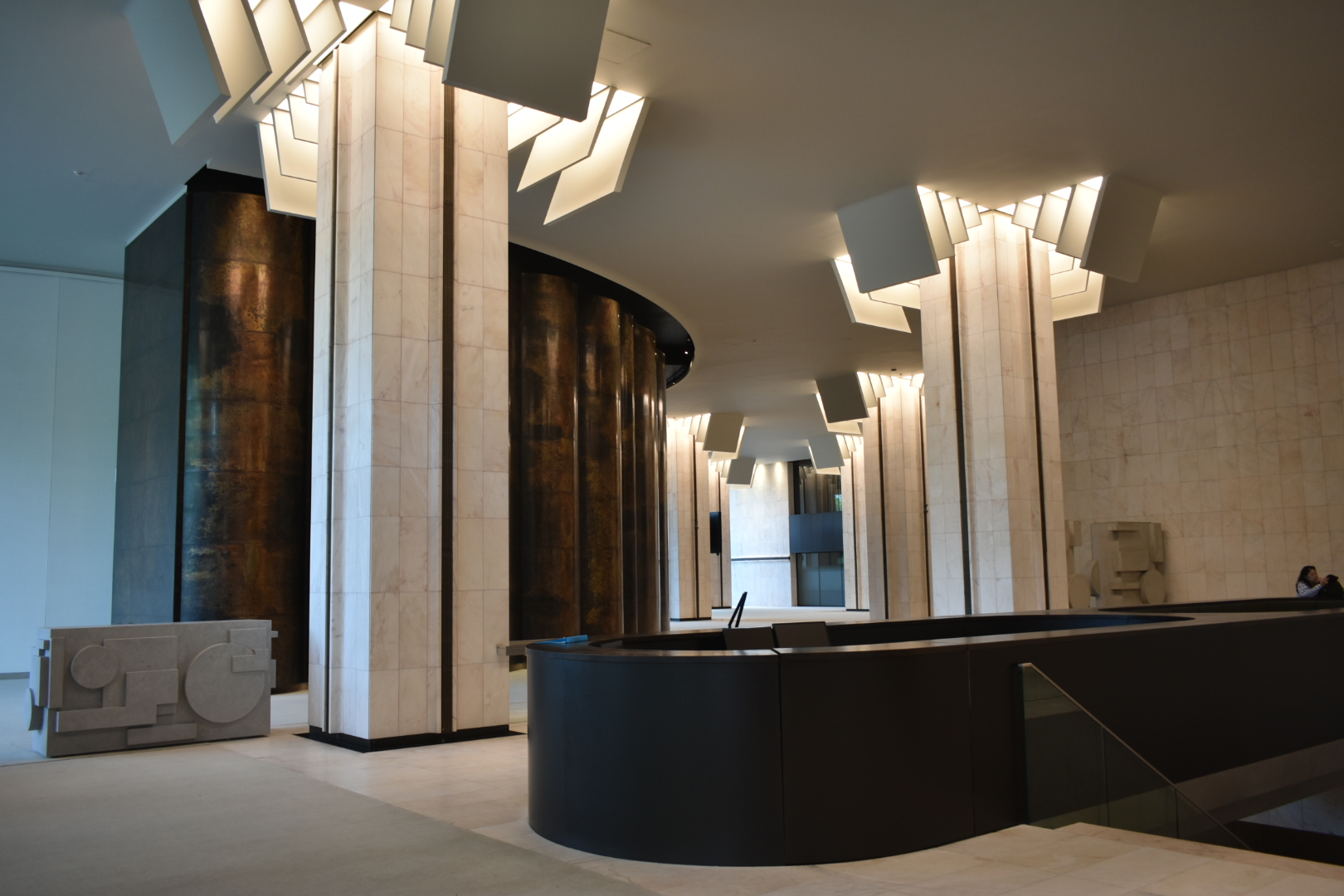
Central hall

== See also ==
- Axa-Royale Belge Tower
