= Hallfield Primary School =

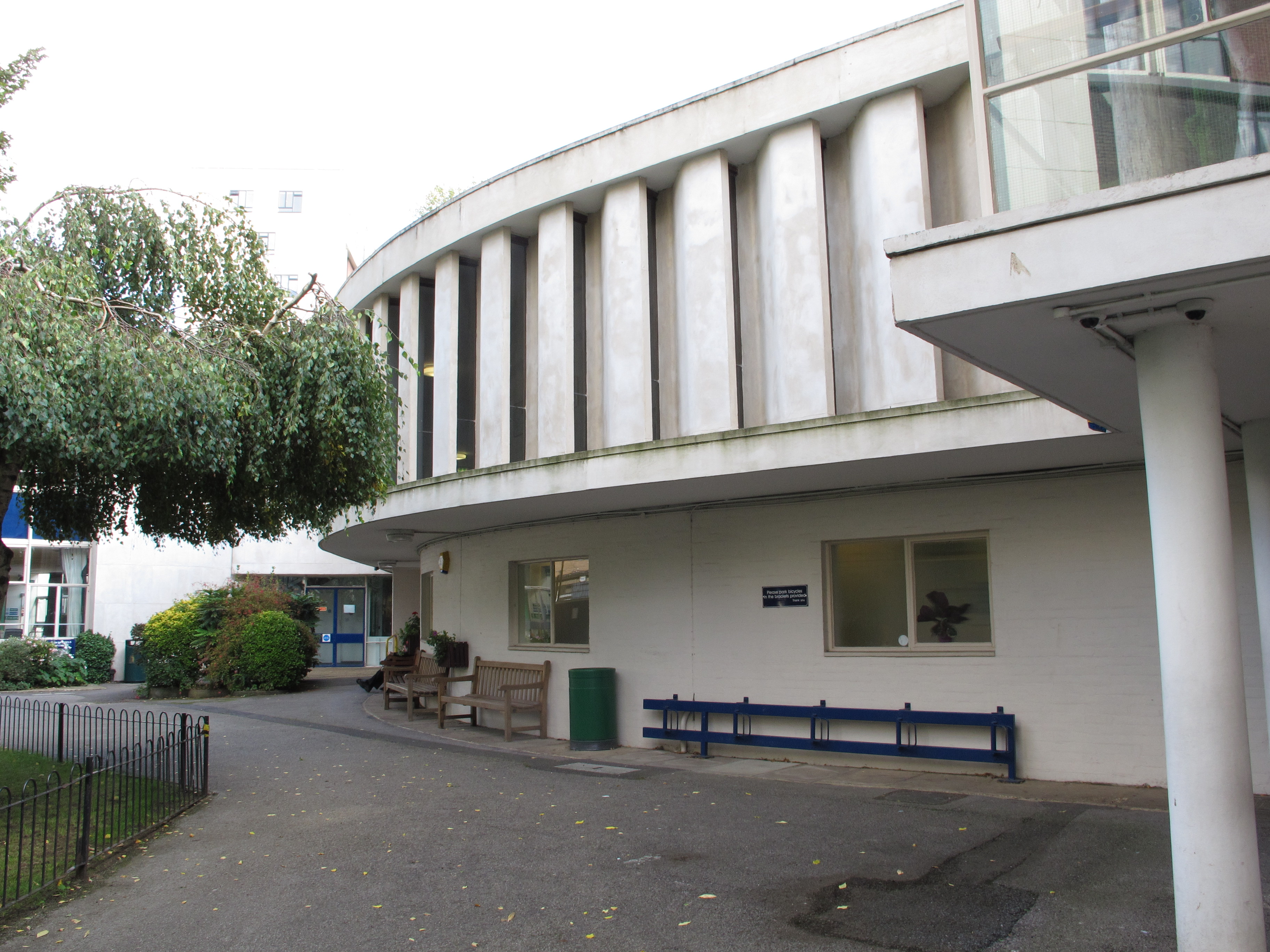

Location
- Inverness Terrace; Hallfield Estate; Bayswater; Westminster, London, W2 6JJ; England
- Coordinates: 51.514869°N 0.186596°W

Information
- Type: Community school
- Local authority: Westminster
- Department for Education URN: 101116 Tables
- Ofsted: Reports
- Headteacher: Mr Aaron Sumner
- Gender: Co-educational
- Age: 2 to 11
- Website: www.hallfieldschool.org.uk

Hallfield Primary School is a two–form-entry co-educational primary school housed in a building of architectural distinction. It is a grade II* listed building in Inverness Terrace on the Hallfield Estate in Westminster, built in 1953–1955 and designed by Denys Lasdun.

== Architectural history ==
The original school designed by Denys Lasdun in the 1950s had become overcrowded by the 1970s. In 2005, new funding allowed two new buildings designed by Caruso St John to be added. These were a RIBA Award Winner in 2006.
