= Lace Market =

Area of Nottingham, England

Coordinates: 52.952°N 1.143°W

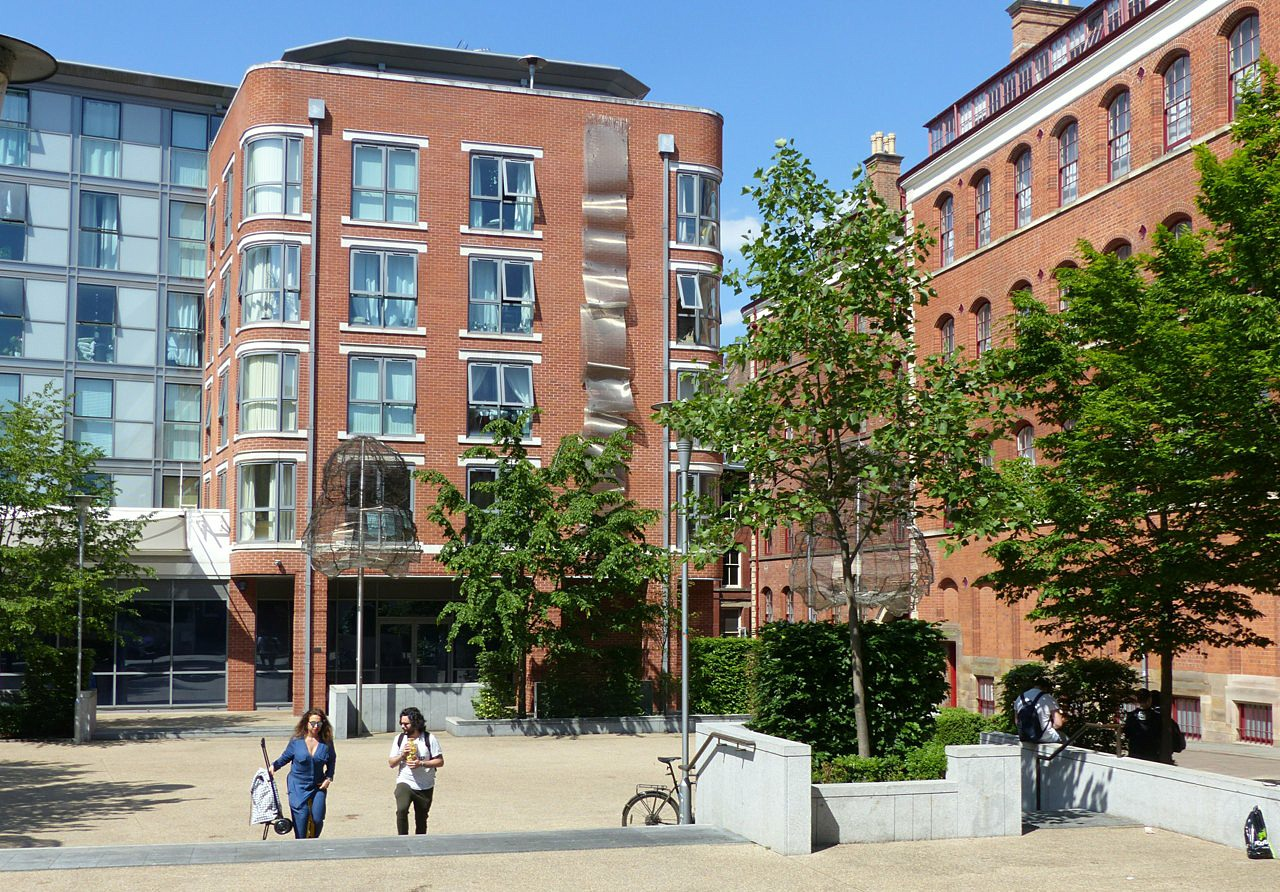
Lace Market Square

The Lace Market is a historic quarter-mile square area in the centre of Nottingham, England. It was once the centre of the world's lace industry and was an area of salesrooms and warehouses for storing, displaying and selling the lace. It is now designated as a conservation area and accommodates a variety of bars, restaurants and shops. It also hosts the Lace Market Theatre, the National Justice Museum and the Nottingham Contemporary arts centre.

The area is served by Nottingham Express Transit's Lace Market tram stop on Fletcher Gate.

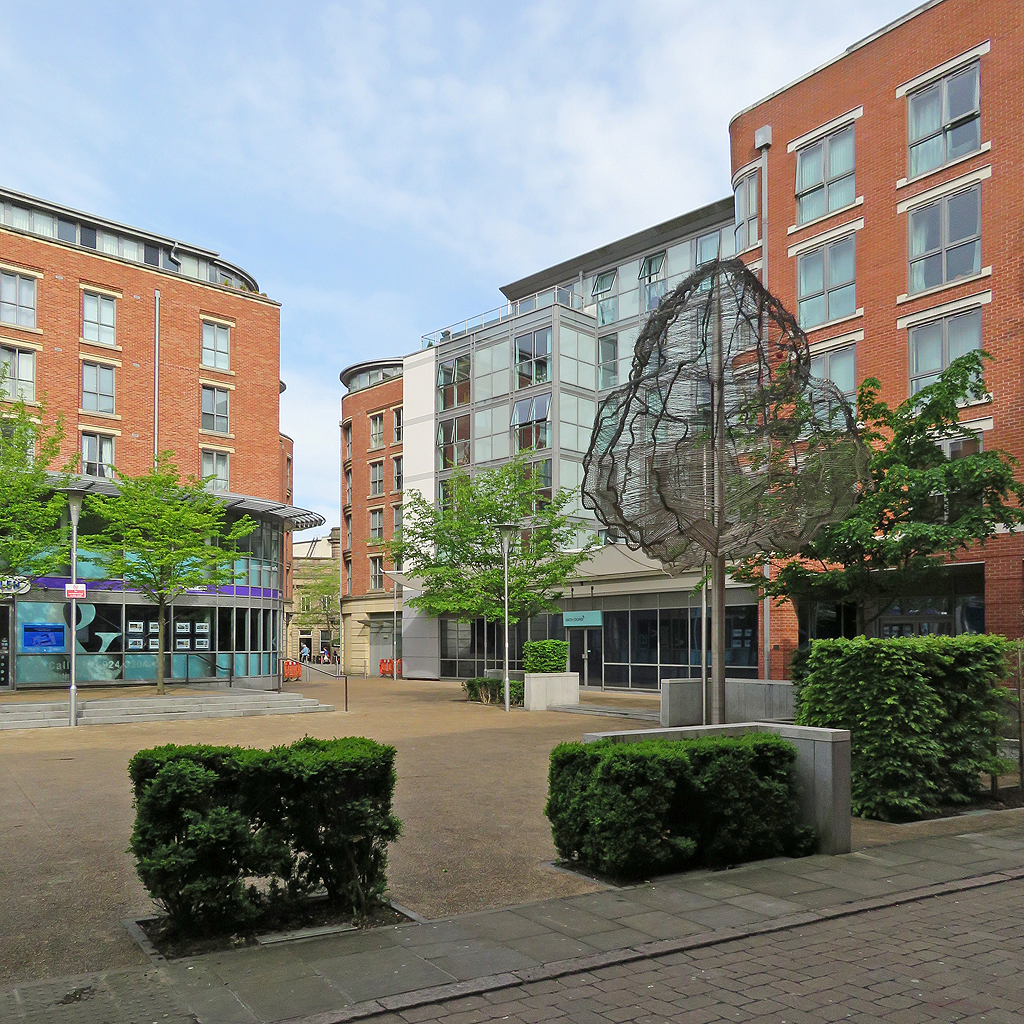
Lace Market Square

== History ==
=== Origins ===
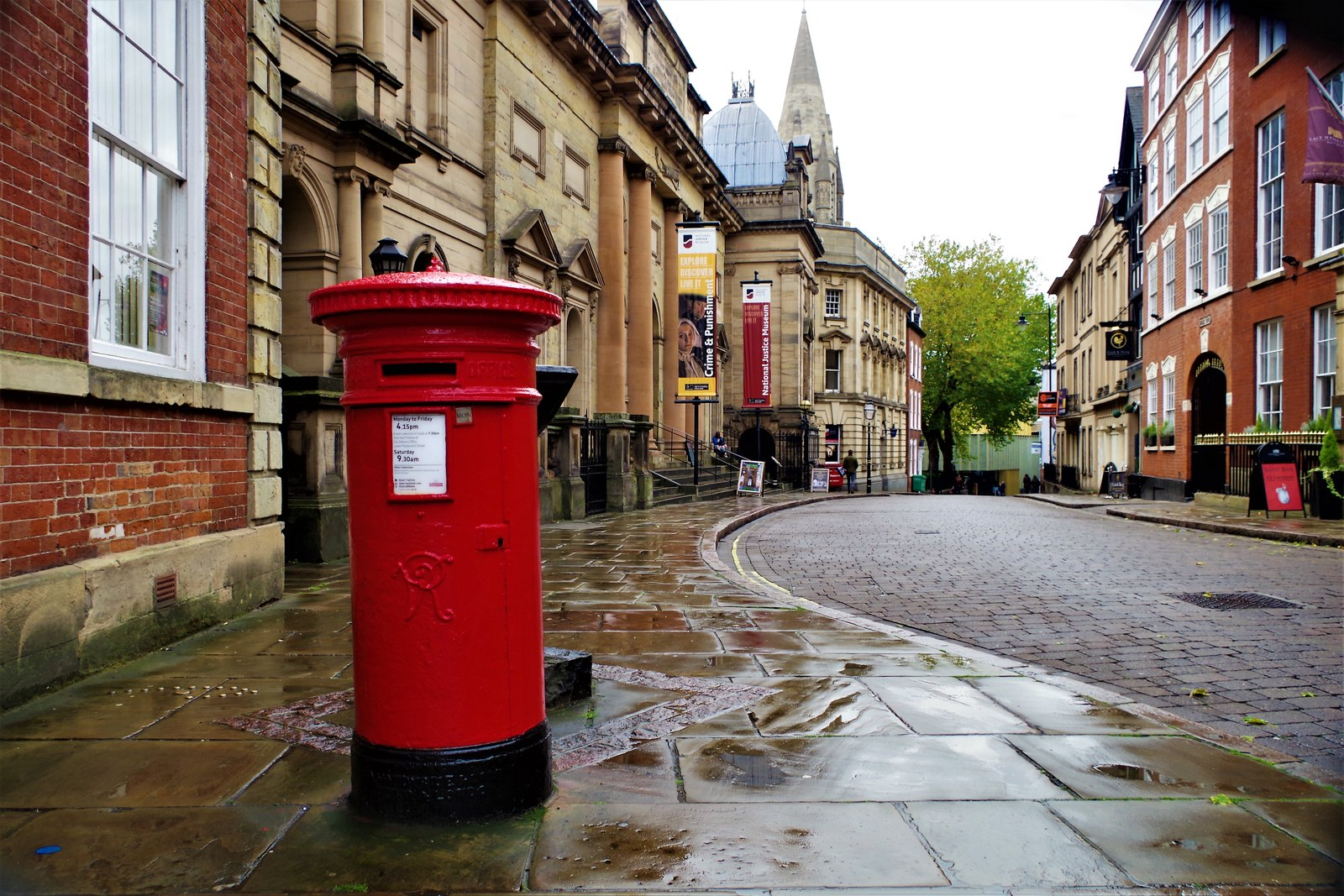
High Pavement

The Lace Market is located on a hill that was the site of the original Saxon settlement of Nottingham. It boasts the oldest Christian foundation in the city, predating the Norman Conquest. St Mary's Church, on High Pavement is believed to be the third church to have stood there but was itself completed in 1474 and is an excellent example of early English Perpendicular architecture.

The Saxon settlement was originally surrounded by a substantial defensive ditch and rampart, which fell out of use following the Norman Conquest and was filled by the time of the Domesday Book (1086). Following the Norman Conquest the Saxon settlement developed into the English borough, which housed a Town Hall and Law Courts. At the same time the French borough developed around the Norman castle on the hill opposite. Eventually the focus of the city became the Old Market Square, situated between the two boroughs, leaving the site of the Saxon settlement to concentrate on the lace industry.

=== The lace industry ===
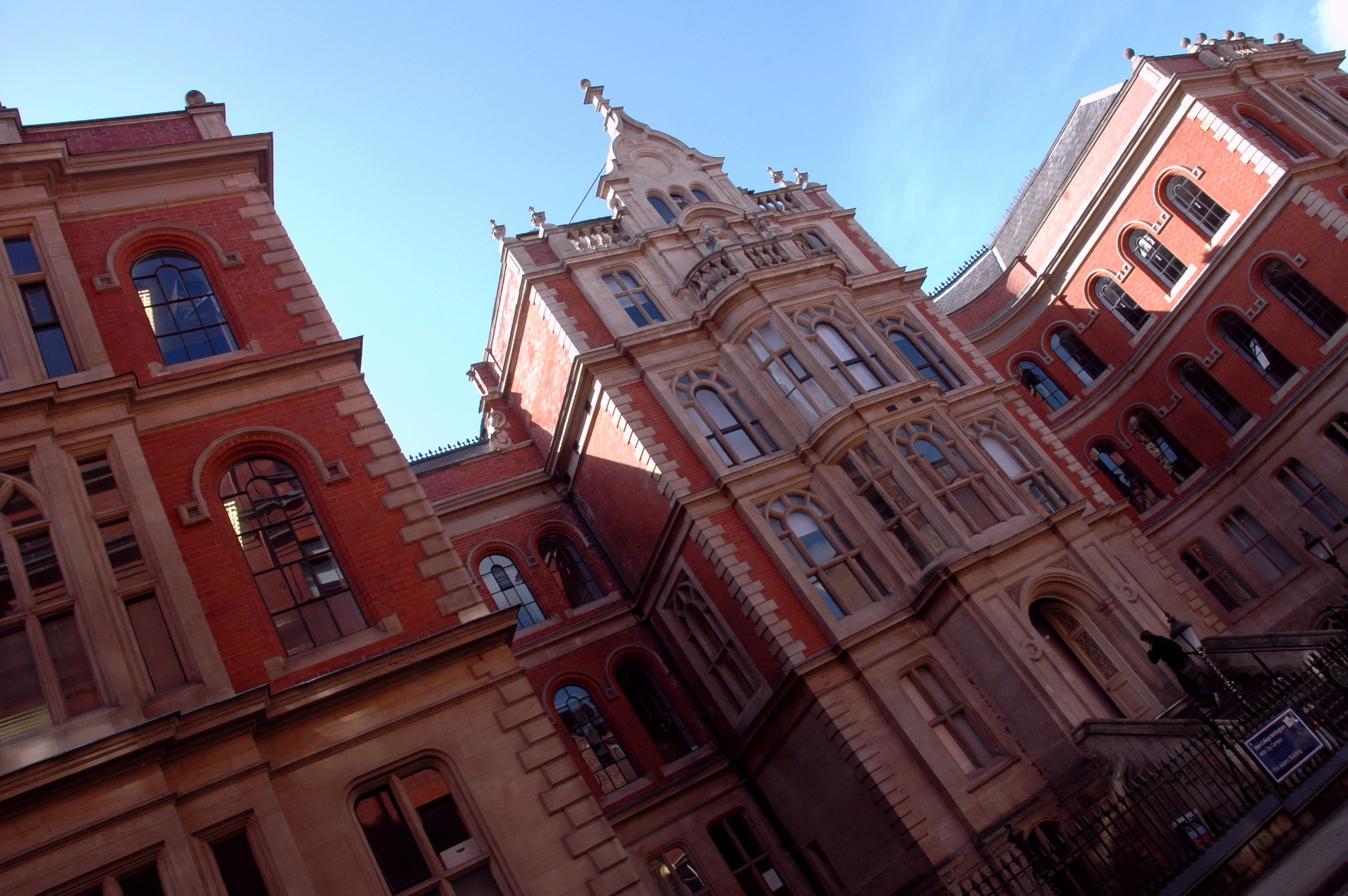
The Adams Building

The area's name, and much of its character, derives from it becoming the heart of the world's lace industry during the days of the British Empire. This transformation followed on from the invention of the stocking frame in 1589 by William Lee, who probably came from the nearby village of Calverton. Although Lee emigrated to France, the stocking knitting trade became centred on Nottingham in the mid-18th century, boosted by the supply of yarn from Richard Arkwright's Derwent Valley Mills.

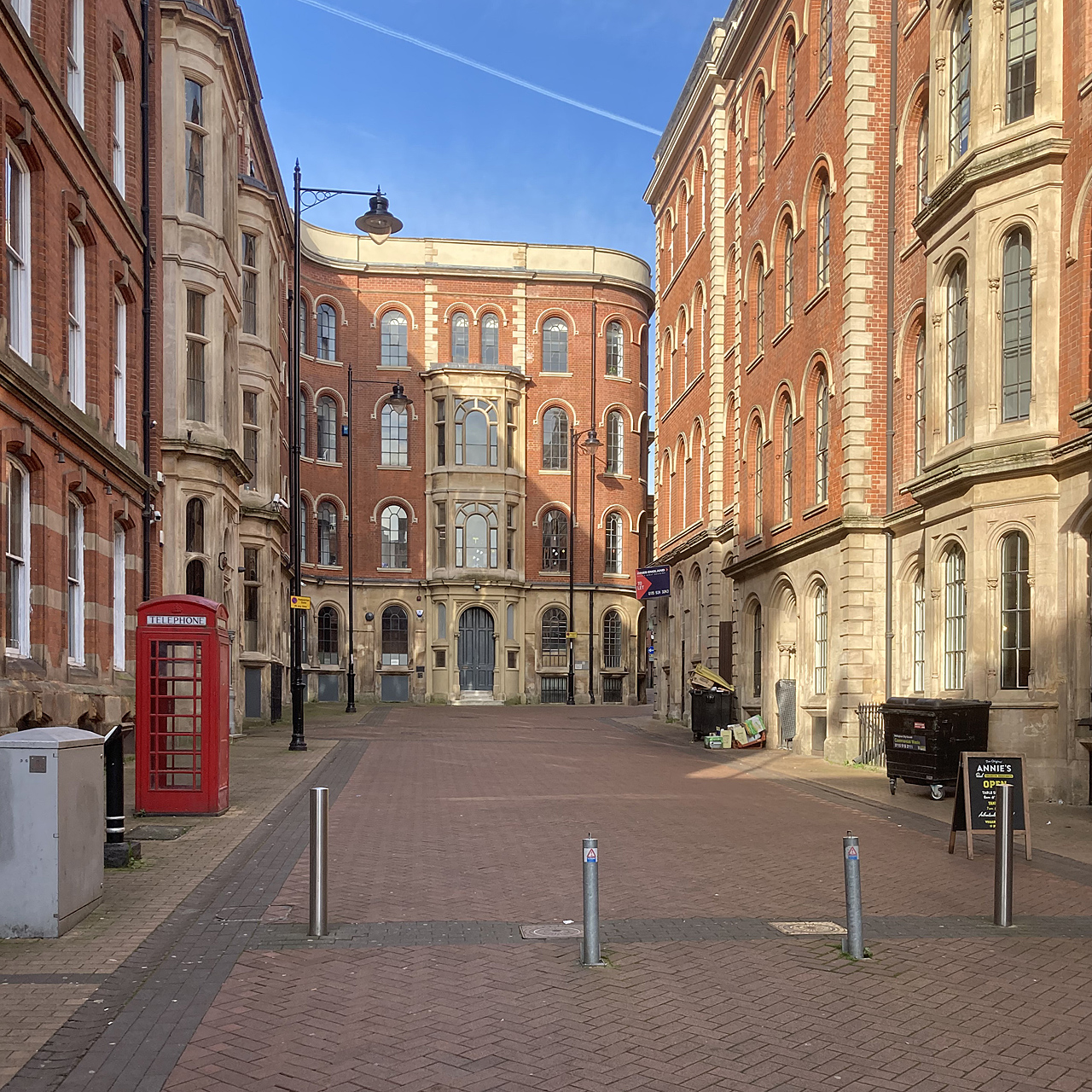
Broadway, Lace Market

In time, the Nottingham stocking knitters discovered how to adapt their machines to knit lace. The Bobbinet machines were invented in 1808 by John Heathcoat, John Levers adapted this to create the Leavers machine in 1813, and John Livesey adapted it into the curtain machine in 1846. These developments eventually gave the Lace Market its name, although it was never a market in the sense of having stalls, but comprised salesrooms and warehouses for storing, displaying and selling the lace.

The local hosiery industry employed 25,000 mostly female workers at its peak in the 1890s. The lace would be finished on the top floors of the large Victorian brick-built warehouses, which are recognisable by their large windows, and then displayed in the downstairs showrooms to buyers from the fashion and domestic furnishing businesses.

=== Decline and regeneration ===
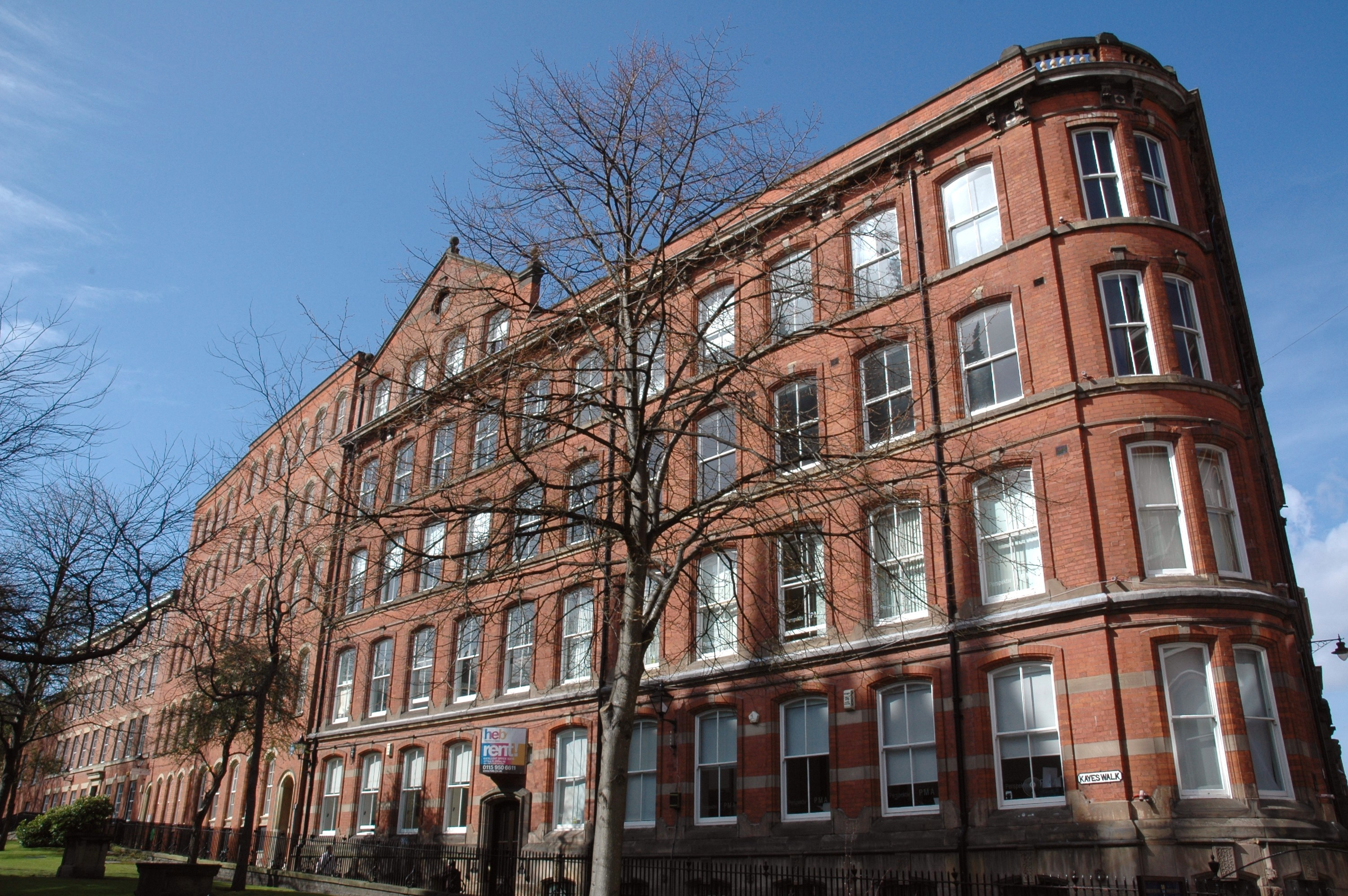
Kayes Walk

Like many large British cities, Nottingham was affected by the decline of traditional industries. Lace declined as technology changed and the working population fell below 5,000 in the 1970s with many of the factories becoming derelict and the area falling into decline.

The Lace Market has since undergone a renaissance and become a flagship for the city's post industrial regeneration. This change started in 1969, with the designation of the area as the city's first conservation area. In 1978, Nottingham City Council led the Operation Clean Up programme offering public grants to building owners to refurbish their historic buildings. Nearly all of the old warehouses that were once run down have now been cleaned and renovated and have found new uses such as luxury apartments, high-spec offices and academic buildings. Several PR and design agencies, as well as technology companies, have made the Lace Market their home.

== Landmarks ==
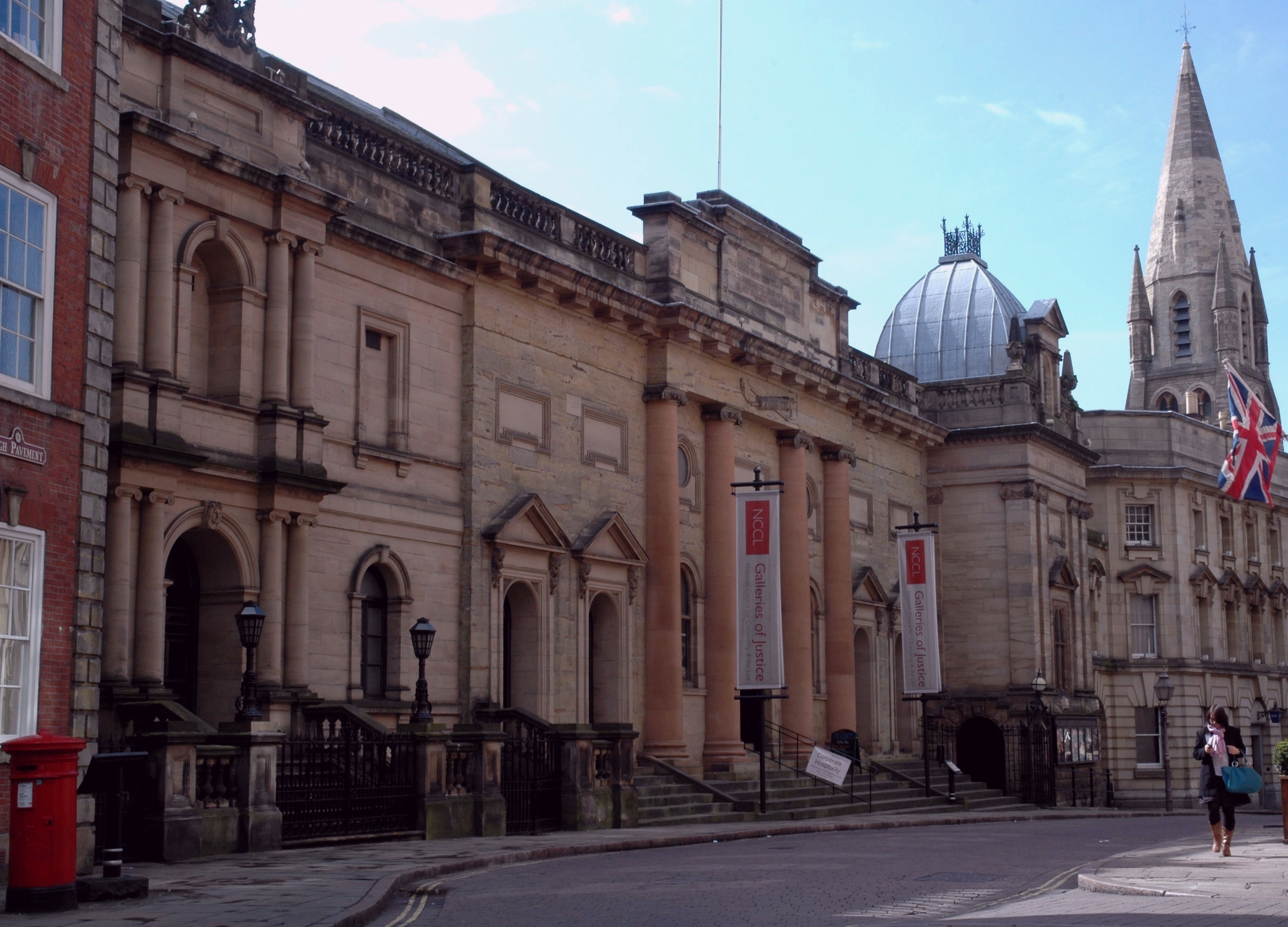
National Justice Museum

Most of the area is typical Victorian, with densely packed 4–7 storey red-brick building lined streets. Iron railings, old gas lamps and red phone boxes give the visitor a sense of going back in time. The Adams Building (now part of the City campus of Nottingham College) was designed by Thomas Chambers Hine and was built for Thomas Adams, a notable Quaker who did much to improve the typical Victorian working conditions in his factories.

Another fine piece of Victorian architecture in the area is a warehouse designed by Watson Fothergill, a prolific local architect responsible for some 100 buildings in the area between 1870 and 1906. His work in the Gothic Revival and Old English vernacular styles was very popular in Victorian times, and means that many shops, banks, houses and even churches are enlivened by turrets, gargoyles, mock Tudor beams and other distinctive features.

To the south of the area, many of the buildings are older, especially on High Pavement, which is a handsome Georgian street that is home to St Mary's Church and the National Justice Museum . The museum is located in the old law courts and County Gaol (jail) – or County Goal as the stonemason accidentally inscribed it, a blunder still visible today above the entrance. There has been a court on the site since 1375, with the present Georgian building being used since 1780.
