= Newport Street Gallery =

Art gallery in London

Coordinates: 51.4933°N 0.1170°W

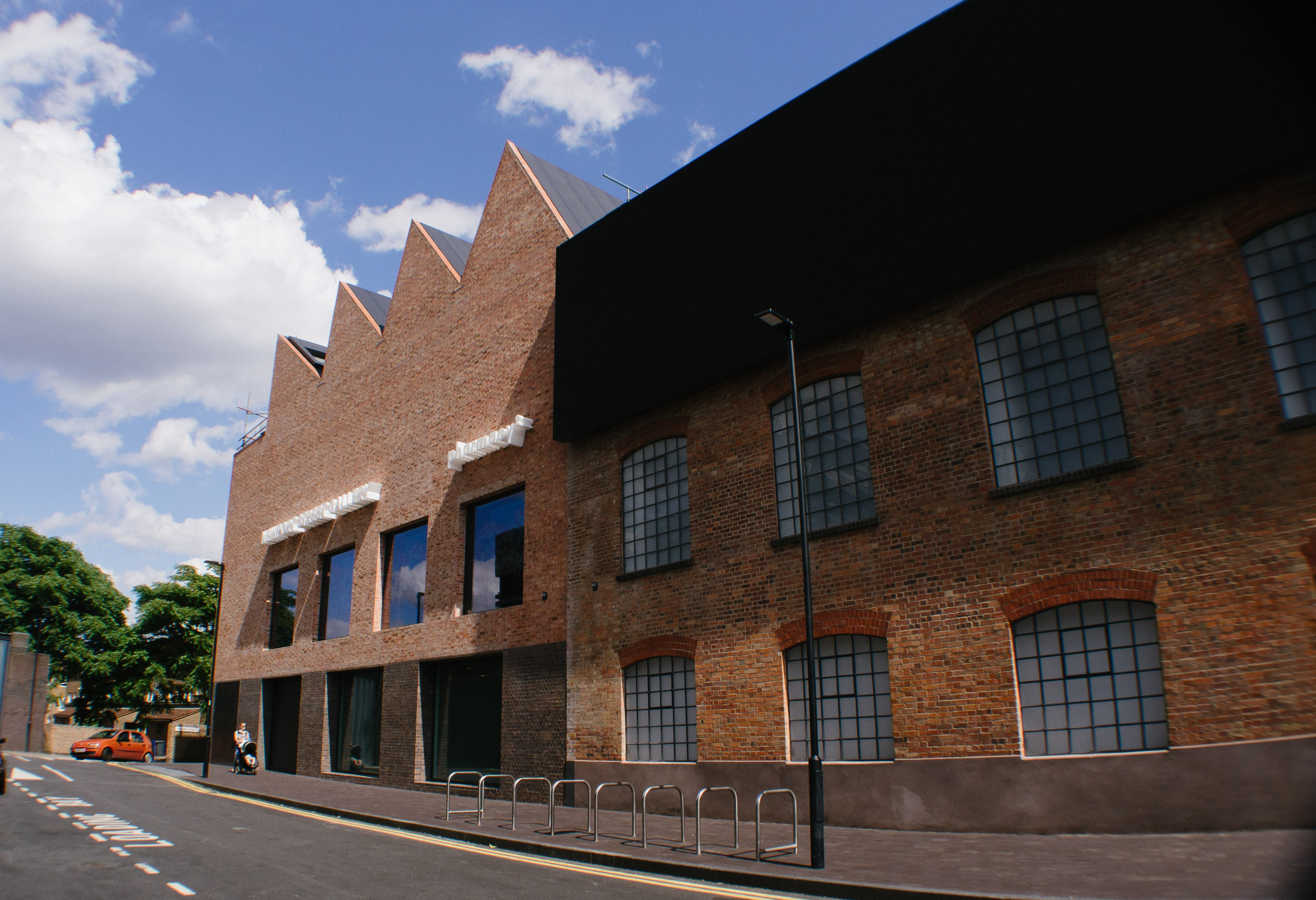

- Location within Central London

General information
- Type: Gallery
- Architectural style: Postmodern
- Location: Lambeth, 1 Newport Street, London, SE1, United Kingdom
- Opened: 8 October 2015; 11 years ago
- Owner: Damien Hirst

Design and construction
- Architect: Caruso St John
- Awards: Stirling Prize

Website
- https://www.newportstreetgallery.com/

The Newport Street Gallery is an art gallery in London, England, created by contemporary artist Damien Hirst for the display of works from his personal art collection, and as a venue to put on exhibitions of interest to him. The Grade II listed building, formerly Hirst's studio, was awarded the RIBA Stirling Prize following its conversion in 2016 by Caruso St John Architects. Located on Newport Street in Vauxhall, admission to the public is free.

Hirst announced plans for the gallery in March 2012, with a stated intent of realising "Hirst's long-term ambition to share his art collection with the public", opening in October 2015. It includes a cafe, gallery shop and offices for Hirst's company.

The building is a former theatre carpentry and scenery production workshop, dating from 1913. It was designed by John Woodward, the London County Council's district surveyor for the area. It is Grade II listed. For its conversion to the gallery, the building was redesigned by Caruso St John. The design was praised for its "virtuosity", and in October 2016 it won the RIBA Stirling Prize.

The gallery spans 37,000 square feet (3,400 m^{2}) and includes six exhibition spaces – one with a ceiling height of 11 metres (36 ft) – split over two levels.

== The collection ==
The Murderme collection, which Hirst has been acquiring since the late 1980s, contains over 3,000 works and features art by Francis Bacon, Banksy, Tracey Emin, Richard Hamilton, Jeff Koons, Sarah Lucas, Pablo Picasso, Richard Prince, Haim Steinbach and Gavin Turk, as well as a number of young and emerging artists such as Helen Beard, Sadie Laska and Boo Saville and a significant collection of work by indigenous artists from the Pacific Northwest coast.

Also featured are natural history specimens, taxidermy, anatomical models and historical artefacts. The collection was previously the subject of large-scale exhibitions at the Serpentine Gallery, London (2006) and the Pinacoteca Giovanni e Marella Agnelli, Turin (2013).
