= Brick House (London) =

Architecturally notable house in London, England

Coordinates: 51.516°N 0.189°W

- Interactive map of the Brick House area

General information
- Location: 31a Hatherley Grove, London, United Kingdom
- Completed: May 2005
- Cost: Confidential
- Client: Private

Design and construction
- Architect: Caruso St John Architects
- Structural engineer: Price & Myers, Mendick Waring

The Brick House is a private house in the Westbourne Grove area of west London that was short-listed for the 2006 Stirling Prize for Architecture. It was designed by the firm of architects Caruso St John and constructed by Harris Calnan Construction with service engineering by Mendick Waring and structural engineering by Price & Myers.

The project inserted a new house, accessed through an archway into the end of a Victorian city-centre street. It was completed in May 2005.

== Site and brief ==
The site was backland development. The design had to accommodate not only restrictions in height (single story), but it was surrounded by overlooking buildings on three sides, with more than 20 party wall agreements. The solution involved partly excavating the lower floor and the use of skylights, with a plan that the architect compared to the shape of a horse's head.

== See also ==
- 2005 in architecture
