= William Bliss Sanders =

English architect

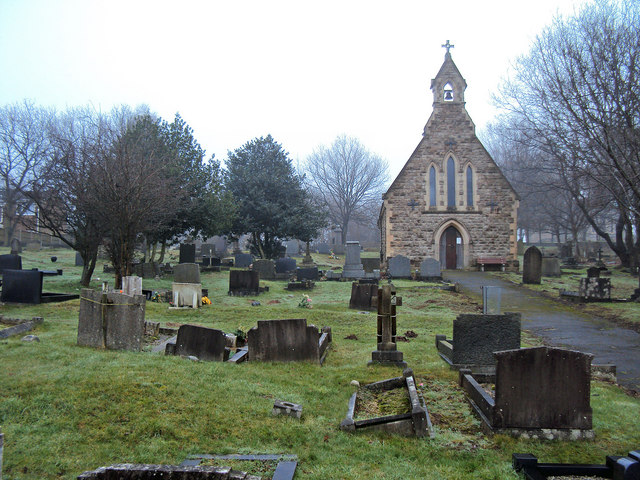
Chapel in Annesley Cemetery 1872

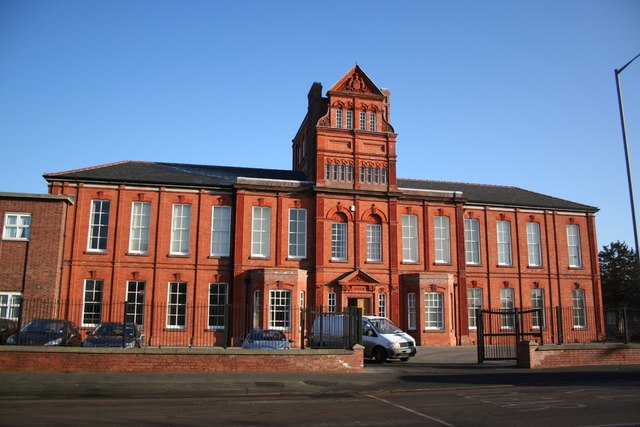
Newark Hospital, London Road 1879–81

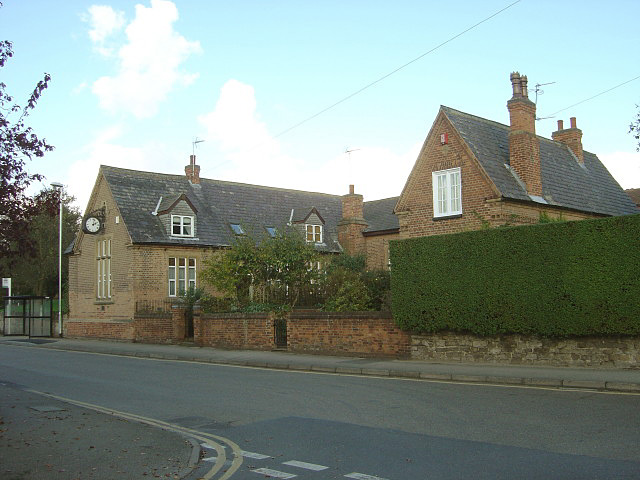
Lowdham School House 1881

William Bliss Sanders (9 February 1841 – 28 March 1896) was an architect based in Nottingham.

== History ==
He was born on 9 February 1841, the son of William Wilkins Sanders and Martha Bliss. He established himself as an architect in the early 1870s with offices on Wheeler Gate in Nottingham. On 17 September 1874, he married Florence Bellinger Skottowe Morris, daughter of Beverley Robinson Morris of York at St Matthew's Church, Talbot Street, Nottingham.

In 1879 he was appointed architect to The Imperial Hydropathic Institution Limited, which had taken over the Binns’ Hotel, Harrogate to improve and develop the Hydropathic facilities available.

In 1883 he published a book with the title Half-timbered houses and carved oak furniture of the 16th and 17th centuries. It has an introduction by John Ruskin.

In 1884 he was appointed a surveyor to the Diocese of Southwell.

He died at 2 Cathcart Road, London on 28 March 1896 and was buried in Burnham Cemetery on 1 April 1896 leaving an estate valued at £1,534 11s 6d.

== Works ==
- School, Hoveringham, Nottinghamshire 1871 (now the village hall)
- Cemetery Chapel, New Annesley 1872
- Pleasley School, Mansfield 1875
- General Hospital, London Road, Newark 1879–81
- Shire Hall, High Pavement, Nottingham 1875–76 enlargement of the Crown Court with new facade.
- Lowdham School 1881
- Northgate Brewery, Newark 1882 Brewhouse for Richard Warwick and Sons
- Northgate Brewery, Newark 1890 Offices for Warwicks and Richardsons Ltd.
- The Colony, Burnham, Somerset 1892 alterations and additions

== Publications ==
Old Oak Bedstead, an illustration from Examples of Carved Oak Woodwork

- Sanders, William Bliss. Examples of Carved Oak Woodwork in the Houses and Furniture of the 16th and 17th Centuries. London: Bernard Quarich.
