= Nottingham Contemporary =

Art centre in Nottingham, England

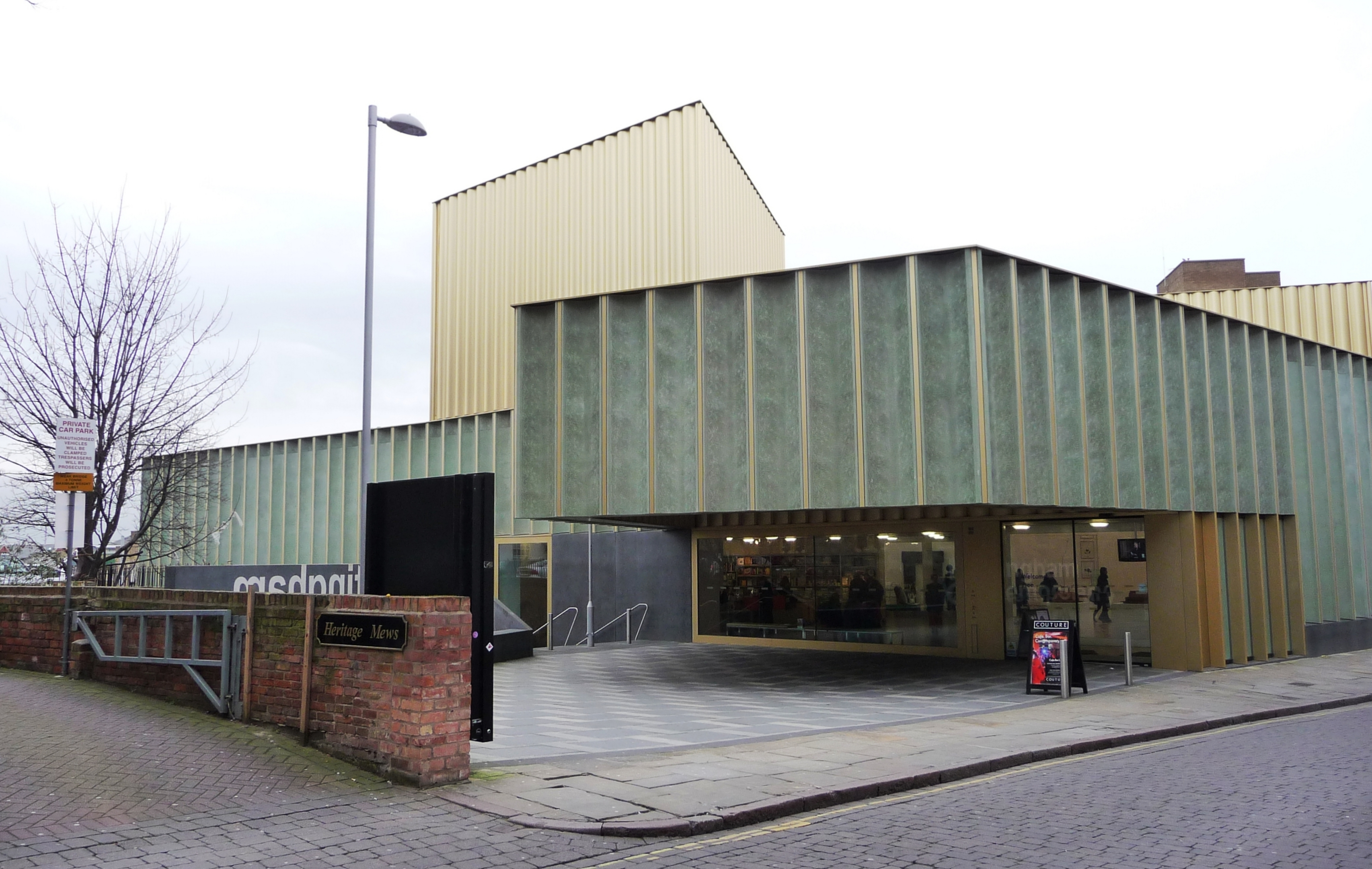
- Interactive map of the Nottingham Contemporary area

General information
- Location: Weekday Cross , Nottingham, NG1 2GB, England
- Coordinates: 52.9511°N 1.1458°W
- Completed: 2009

Design and construction
- Architect: Caruso St John Architects
- Structural engineer: Arup, Elliott Wood Partnership
- Services engineer: Arup
- Main contractor: Sol Construction Ltd
- Awards: 2010 RIBA Award Winner

Website
- www.nottinghamcontemporary.org

Nottingham Contemporary (formerly known as the Centre for Contemporary Art Nottingham (CCAN)) is a contemporary art centre in the Lace Market area of Nottingham, England. The gallery opened in 2009.

The gallery describes its site as being "the oldest in the city", having been the site of a Saxon fort. To celebrate the area's history of lace manufacture, the cladding of the building is embossed with a traditional Nottingham lace pattern.

Nottingham Contemporary is a registered charity under English law.

== Exhibition programme ==
Nottingham Contemporary organises four to five major exhibitions a year, bringing the work of the world's contemporary artists to Nottingham. The ideas raised by the exhibitions are explored in educational programmes for all ages. The museum opened on 14 November 2009 with an exhibition of early works by David Hockney and recent works by Los Angeles-based artist Frances Stark, including some from the Tate collection.

Since then, the gallery has hosted a number of major thematic exhibitions including The Place is Here (2017), a landmark survey of Black British Art; States of America (2017), the largest-ever survey of American photography in the UK; Glenn Ligon's Encounters and Collisions (2015); and From Ear to Ear to Eye (2017–2018), an exploration of the politics of listening across the Arab world.

== Building ==
The building was designed by the London architects Caruso St John. With over 3,000 square metres (32,000 sq ft) of floor space, it is one of the largest contemporary art centres in the UK. The exterior is clad in verdigris scalloped panels with a traditional lace pattern, with large windows that offer direct views from the street into the interior. The building is larger than it appears from the outside, because much of it is sunk into the sandstone cliff that runs through the city centre.

Nottingham Contemporary is one of the largest contemporary art spaces in the UK, with four galleries, an auditorium, an education space and a study centre. The building also houses a café-bar and a shop.

The building has been acclaimed by architectural critics. Ellis Woodman in Building Design complimented how the building's facades successfully expressed its relationship with the city. Owen Hatherley stated that "this might, irrespective of the leaky roof, be the first masterpiece of British architecture of the twenty-first century."

== Site ==
Nottingham Contemporary is on the oldest site in Nottingham, Garners Hill, it once housed cave dwellings, a Saxon fort and a medieval town hall – before the Victorians swept all aside for a railway line. It is in the historic Lace Market, a showcase for a world-famous fabric when technical innovation gave lace a mass market. A revolutionary concrete casting technique, carried out in Nottingham, has embossed a lace design into the building's panels, some up to 11 metres (36 ft) tall.

== Management ==
Sam Thorne was appointed director in 2015, taking up the position in early 2016, following on from the founding director Alex Farquharson (2007–2015).

== See also ==
- National Justice Museum
