= Centromere protein L =

Protein found in humans

CENPL

Identifiers
- Aliases: CENPL, C1orf155, CENP-L, dJ383J4.3, centromere protein L
- External IDs: OMIM: 611503; MGI: 1917704; GeneCards: CENPL

Gene location (Human)
Chr.	Chromosome 1 (human)
Band	1q25.1	Start	173,799,550 bp
Band	1q25.1	End	173,824,720 bp

Gene location (Mouse)
Chr.	Chromosome 1 (mouse)
Band	1|1 H2.1	Start	160,898,283 bp
Band	1|1 H2.1	End	160,914,294 bp
RNA expression pattern
Bgee	Human / Mouse (ortholog); Top expressed in: oocyte; ventricular zone; secondary oocyte; gonad; ganglionic eminence; testicle; endothelial cell; bone marrow; stromal cell of endometrium; bone marrow cell / Top expressed in: hand; medial ganglionic eminence; genital tubercle; thymus; ventricular zone; granulocyte; tail of embryo; epiblast; embryo; embryo; More reference expression data
BioGPS	n/a
Gene ontology
Molecular function	protein binding
Cellular component	chromosome; cytosol; chromosome, centromeric region; nucleus; nucleoplasm
Biological process	CENP-A containing chromatin assembly
Sources:Amigo / QuickGO
Orthologs
Databases	NCBI: entry; OMA: entry
Species	Human	Mouse
Entrez	91687	70454
Ensembl	ENSG00000120334	ENSMUSG00000026708
UniProt	Q8N0S6	Q3U3S3
RefSeq (mRNA)	NM_033319; NM_001127181; NM_001171182	NM_001159930; NM_027429
RefSeq (protein)	NP_001120653; NP_001164653; NP_201576	NP_001153402
Location (UCSC)	Chr 1: 173.8 – 173.82 Mb	Chr 1: 160.9 – 160.91 Mb
PubMed search
- Wikidata
View/Edit Human	View/Edit Mouse

Centromere protein L (CENPL or CENP-L) is a protein that in humans is encoded by the CENPL gene. It is known for its role in forming the centromere and building a functional kinetochore during cell division. CENPL acts as part of the CENP-L/N complex and also contributes to larger centromeric groups such as CENPA-CAD and CENP-H/I/K/L/M subcomplexes, which belong to the constitutive centromere-associated network (CCAN). These proteins work together to recognize CENPA-containing nucleosomes and help establish the site where the kinetochore will assemble, supporting accurate chromosome segregation during mitosis.

== Discovery and complex formation ==
CENP-L was identified as part of a broader effort to classify the proteins associated with CENPA, CENPH, and CENPI in vertebrate cells. These studies led to the discovery of several new CENP proteins including CENPL and CENPN, which were grouped with other newly described proteins into what is now known as CCAN. Within this complex, the CENP-L and CENP-N proteins join in a CENP-L/N complex, one of the four major CCAN subcomplexes. Structural studies in other organisms have shown that CENPL and CENPN form a stable heterodimer, and this overall arrangement is conserved across species. In human cells, biochemical work indicates that CENPL binds to the C-terminal region of CENPN to form the complete complex.

CENPL is part of a group of centromere associated proteins that show evidence of evolutionary conservation across eukaryotic organisms. Studies of kinetochore organization have shown that several CCAN components, including the CENP-L/N complex, are present from budding yeast to vertebrates.

== CENP-L/N complex ==
The CENP-L/N complex is formed when CENPL associates with its binding partner CENPN, creating a stable heterodimer that acts as one of the core subcomplexes within the CCAN. In this complex, CENPN directly recognizes CENPA-containing nucleosomes through its interaction with the CENPA centromere domain, while CENPL binds the C terminal region of CENPN to complete the heterodimer. As part of the CCAN, the CENP-L/N complex helps maintain the organization of the inner kinetochore and supports the centromere localization of other CCAN components. When CENPN is disrupted and the complex cannot assemble properly, several proteins such as CENPI and CENPT lose their normal localization at the centromere, showing that the CENP-L/N complex plays a key role in stabilizing CCAN structure and supporting accurate kinetochore assembly. During early centromere assembly, the CENP-L/N complex helps establish the initial connections between CENPA chromatin and the CCAN network. If this complex is disrupted, several CCAN components fail to remain at centromeres. The protein is thus essential for early stages of kinetochore formation.

== Expression and localization ==
CENPL is expressed in human cells that divide often, which matches its role in helping organize the centromere and build the kinetochore. According to gene databases, CENPL shows strongest functional relevance in tissues with high cell-cycle activity, since accurate chromosome separation depends on having the right centromere components in place.

Research on kinetochore organization shows that CENPL stays associated with centromeric regions throughout the entire cell cycle, but its role becomes most important as cells enter mitosis. During early mitosis, CENPA nucleosomes begin recruiting CCAN proteins, including the CENP-L/N complex, which depends on CENPL to help secure their position at the centromere. Having CENPL already in place before microtubules attach helps create a stable environment for proper chromosome alignment and segregation.

Functional studies also show that CENPL needs to be correctly localized for the centromere to form normally. When CENPL levels are reduced, other CCAN proteins do not load efficiently, weakening the inner kinetochore and delaying chromosome alignment during mitosis. These findings support the idea that CENPL’s expression and location at the centromere are tightly linked to its role in maintaining accurate cell division.

=== Kinetochore-microtubule attachment ===
CENPL does not bind microtubules directly, but it still influences how kinetochore–microtubule attachments form by helping maintain the organization of the inner kinetochore. When the CENP-L/N complex is disrupted, several CCAN proteins that normally contribute to building the outer kinetochore do not remain properly localized at the centromere, which weakens attachments.

Studies on kinetochore mechanics also show that reducing CCAN components leads to less stable microtubule attachments. Cells with disrupted CCAN function display irregular chromosome movements and alignment defects during mitosis, indicating problems with the stability of kinetochore–microtubule interactions. Because many of these CCAN proteins depend on the CENP-L/N complex for their centromere localization, CENPL plays an indirect but important role in supporting proper microtubule attachment and accurate chromosome segregation.

=== Genomic stability ===
CENPL contributes to maintaining conditions required for accurate chromosome segregation through its role in the CENP-L/N complex and its association with pathways involved in cell-cycle progression. Disruption of CENPN, and therefore the CENP-L/N complex, leads to weakened inner-kinetochore organization and chromosome alignment defects during mitosis, threatening genomic stability.

=== Cell cycle regulation ===
CENPL is closely linked to pathways that control the cell cycle, and changes in its expression can influence how quickly cells progress through stages of division. Genome wide expression analyses in breast cancer have shown that high CENPL expression is strongly associated with gene sets involved in nuclear division, organelle fission, chromosome segregation, and other mitotic processes. These enrichment results suggest that CENPL is part of a broader regulatory environment that supports rapid cell cycle progression in dividing cells.

Additional transcriptomic studies have identified CENPL as one of several upregulated hub genes associated with DNA replication and cell-cycle activation in tumor tissues. Experimental evidence further supports a functional role for CENPL in regulating cell-cycle dynamics. In breast cancer cell lines, CENPL knockdown significantly reduced cell proliferation rates and colony formation ability, indicating that CENPL helps maintain the conditions necessary for growth.

== Clinical significance ==
Patterns of CENPL expression across cancer studies show that this gene is often upregulated in tumors. In some cases, increased expression may be influenced by changes in gene regulation, including copy number gains or altered DNA methylation patterns, which can make the gene more transcriptionally active in tumor environments. Large-scale analyses also identify CENPL as one of several hub genes with possible diagnostic value, since its expression patterns can help distinguish tumor samples from normal tissue with relatively high accuracy. Elevated CENPL expression is also seen in liver, lung, ovarian, and several gastrointestinal cancers, and experimental work in hepatocellular carcinoma shows that reducing CENPL disrupts proliferation and affects MEK1/2–ERK1/2 signaling, which supports tumor cell survival. In all cases, CENPL expression is associated with correct and timely chromosome separation, supporting rapid cell division.
