= Caruso St John =

British architectural firm

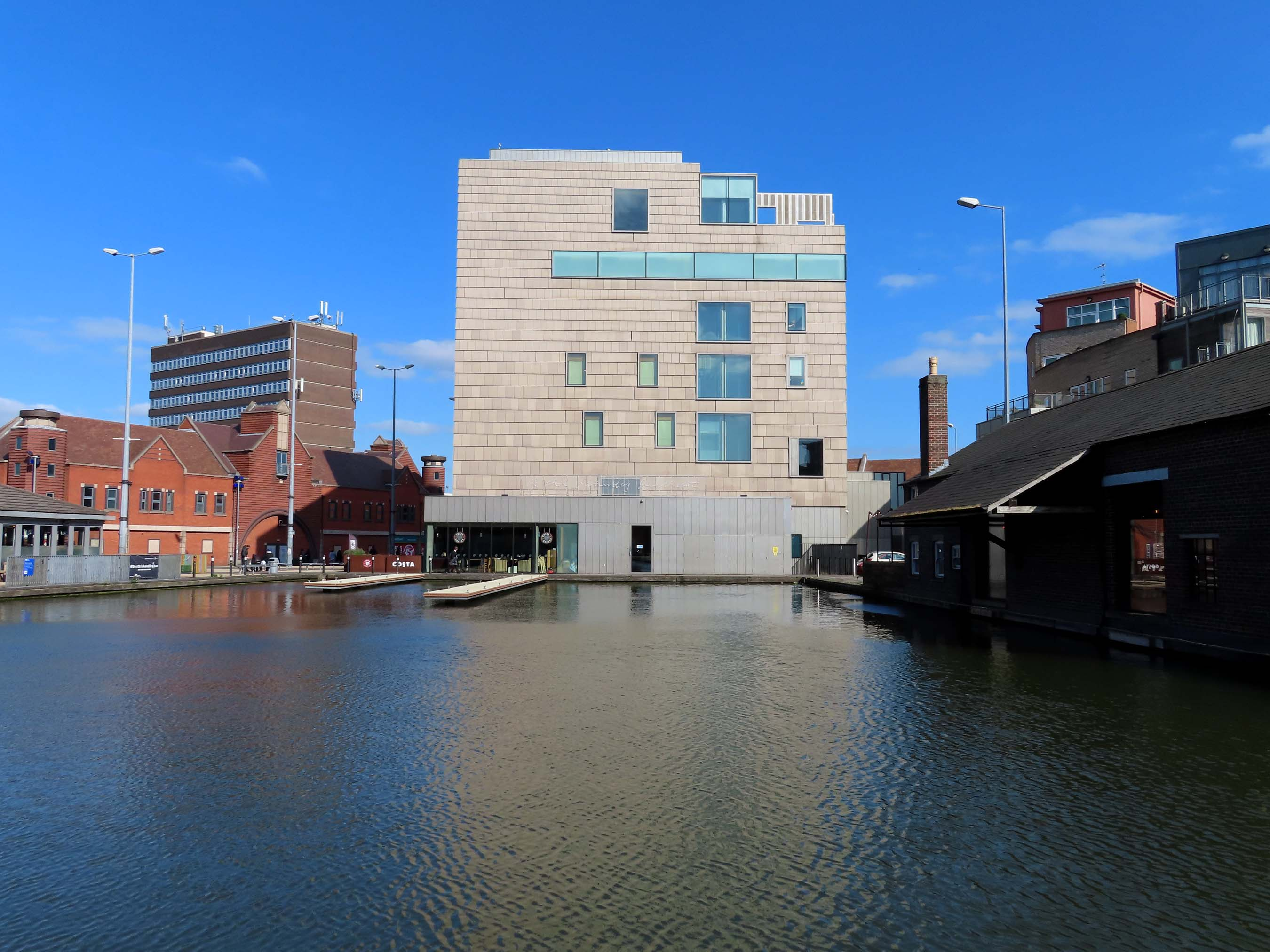
- The New Art Gallery Walsall in 2019

Practice information
- Founders: Adam Caruso, Peter St John
- Founded: 1990; 36 years ago
- Location: London

Significant works and honors
- Buildings: Newport Street Gallery; The New Art Gallery Walsall; Brick House
- Awards: 2016 Stirling Prize

Website
- carusostjohn.com

Caruso St John is a British architectural practice founded in 1990 by Adam Caruso and Peter St John. The firm first came to wider attention with The New Art Gallery Walsall, completed after an international competition win in 1995, and has since worked across a broad range of public and private projects. Caruso St John won the RIBA Stirling Prize in 2016 for Newport Street Gallery, having previously been shortlisted in 2000 and 2006.

== Practice ==
Caruso St John gained international recognition for its designs of public spaces. The practice came to wider attention with The New Art Gallery Walsall, a commission won in an international competition in 1995. From these origins in the visual arts, the firm now works across a broad range of public and private projects.

== Clients ==
Current and past clients include Tate Britain, the V&A, English Heritage and the Arts Council of England, as well as European housing developers Trudo, the SBB (Swiss National Railways), and the Gagosian Gallery. Caruso St John seeks to maintain a broad range of work at different scales and to resist the trend towards increased size and specialisation in contemporary architecture.

== Works ==
- Royale Belge, Brussels (2023)
- Chiswick House Café (2010)
- Thomas Demand, Nationalgalerie (2009)
- Nottingham Contemporary (2009)
- Frieze Art Fair (2008–2010)
- Downing College, Cambridge (2009)
- The Victoria and Albert Museum of Childhood (2007)
- Spike Island Artists' Studios (2006)
- Gagosian Gallery Rome (2006)
- Gagosian Gallery Davies St (2006)
- Stephen Friedman Gallery (2005)
- Hallfield Primary School (2005)
- Brick House (2005)
- Gagosian Gallery Britannia St (2005)
- Stortorget, Kalmar (2004)
- Coate House (2001)
- Barbican Concert Hall (2001)
- New Art Gallery Walsall (2000)
- Bankside Directional Signage System (1999)
- House in Lincolnshire (1994)

== Awards ==
The firm won the RIBA Stirling Prize in 2016 for Newport Street Gallery, which was built to house the private art collection of Damien Hirst, having previously been shortlisted in 2000 for The New Art Gallery Walsall and in 2006 for the Brick House.

== Teaching ==
Both Adam Caruso and Peter St John have taught in architecture schools throughout the lifetime of the practice. Caruso taught at the University of North London from 1990 to 2000 and was Professor of Architecture at the University of Bath from 2002 to 2005. He has been a visiting professor at the Academy of Architecture in Mendrisio, the Graduate School of Design at Harvard University, ETH Zürich, and the LSE Cities Programme at the London School of Economics. In 2011 he was appointed Professor of Architecture and Construction at ETH Zürich.

Peter St John taught at the University of North London from 1990 to 2000. He was a visiting professor at the Academy of Architecture in Mendrisio from 1999 to 2001 and at the Department of Architecture and Civil Engineering at the University of Bath from 2001 to 2004. In 2005 he was a visiting critic at the Graduate School of Design at Harvard University, and from 2007 to 2009 he was a visiting professor at ETH Zürich. He is currently an external examiner at the Scott Sutherland School of Architecture and Built Environment in Aberdeen and at the Cardiff School of Architecture, and teaches a design unit at London Metropolitan University.
