= National Justice Museum =

Museum housed in a former courtroom, prison, and police station in Nottingham, England

Coordinates: 52°57′3″N 1°8′40″W

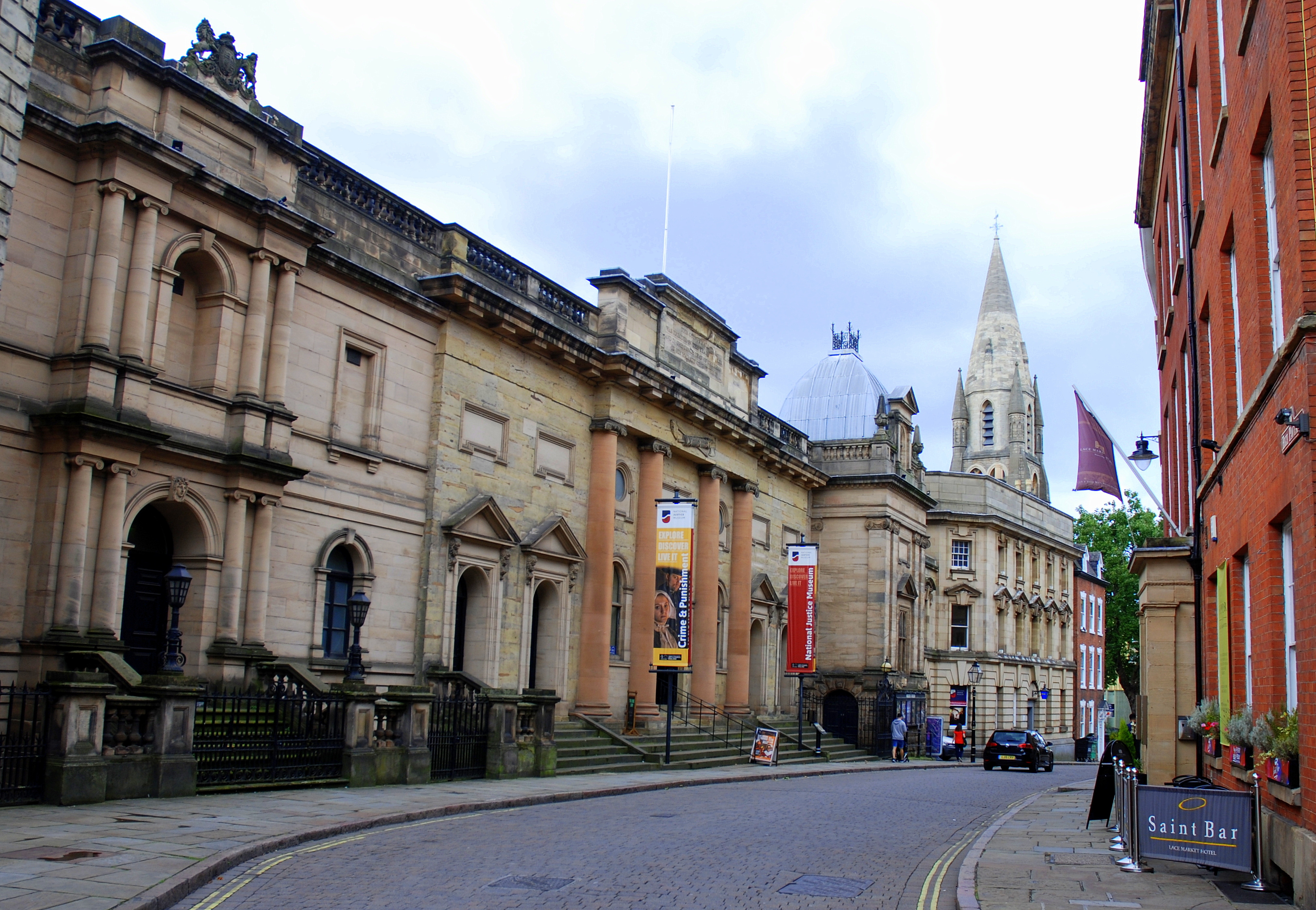
- The museum in 2019
- Former name: Galleries of Justice Museum
- Established: 1995
- Location: The Lace Market, Nottingham
- Collection size: HM Prison Service collection
- Director: Victoria Reeves
- Public transit access: Bus, tram, train
- Website: www.nationaljusticemuseum.org.uk

Listed Building – Grade II*
- Official name: Shire Hall and Adjoining County Gaol
- Designated: 24 October 1988
- Reference no.: 1254517

The National Justice Museum (formerly known as the Galleries of Justice Museum and, historically, the Shire Hall and County Gaol) is an independent museum on High Pavement in the Lace Market area of Nottingham, England.

The museum is housed in a former Victorian courtroom, prison, and police station and is therefore a historic site where an individual could be arrested, tried, sentenced and executed. The courtrooms date back to the 14th century and the gaol to at least 1449.

The building is a Grade II* listed building and the museum is a registered charity.

== History ==
=== Early history ===
The earliest confirmed use of the site for official purposes was by the Normans, who appointed sheriffs to keep the peace and collect taxes; hence the site was sometimes referred to as the Sheriff's Hall, the County Hall or the King's Hall. The first written record of the site being used as a law court dates from 1375. The first written reference to its use as a prison is in 1449.

=== Eighteenth century ===
Over the centuries, the courts and prison were developed and enlarged. In 1724, the courtroom floor collapsed. The Nottingham Courant in March 1724 recorded:

On Monday morning after the Judge had gone into the County Hall, and a great crowd of people being there, a tracing or two that supported the floor broke and fell in and several people fell in with it, about three yards into the cellar underneath. Some were bruised, but one man named Fillingham was pretty much hurt, one leg being stripped to the bone, and was much hurt. This caused a great consternation in the Court, some apprehending the Hall might fall, others crying out fire etc.; which made several people climb out of the windows. The Judge being also terribly frightened, cried out "A plot! A plot!" but the consternation soon being over the Court proceeded to business.

The hall was rebuilt between 1769 and 1772. The architect was James Gandon of London and the cost around £2,500 (equivalent to £425,765 in 2025). The builder was Joseph Pickford of Derby. The design for the building involved an asymmetrical main frontage facing onto High Pavement: the right hand section of three bays featured a round headed doorway flanked by two round headed windows and full-height Ionic order columns; there was a rectangular blank panel above the doorway flanked by roundels. The inscription on the top of the building reads:

This County Hall was erected in the year MDCCLXX and in the tenth year of the reign of His Majesty George III.

The building was originally fronted by a high palisade.

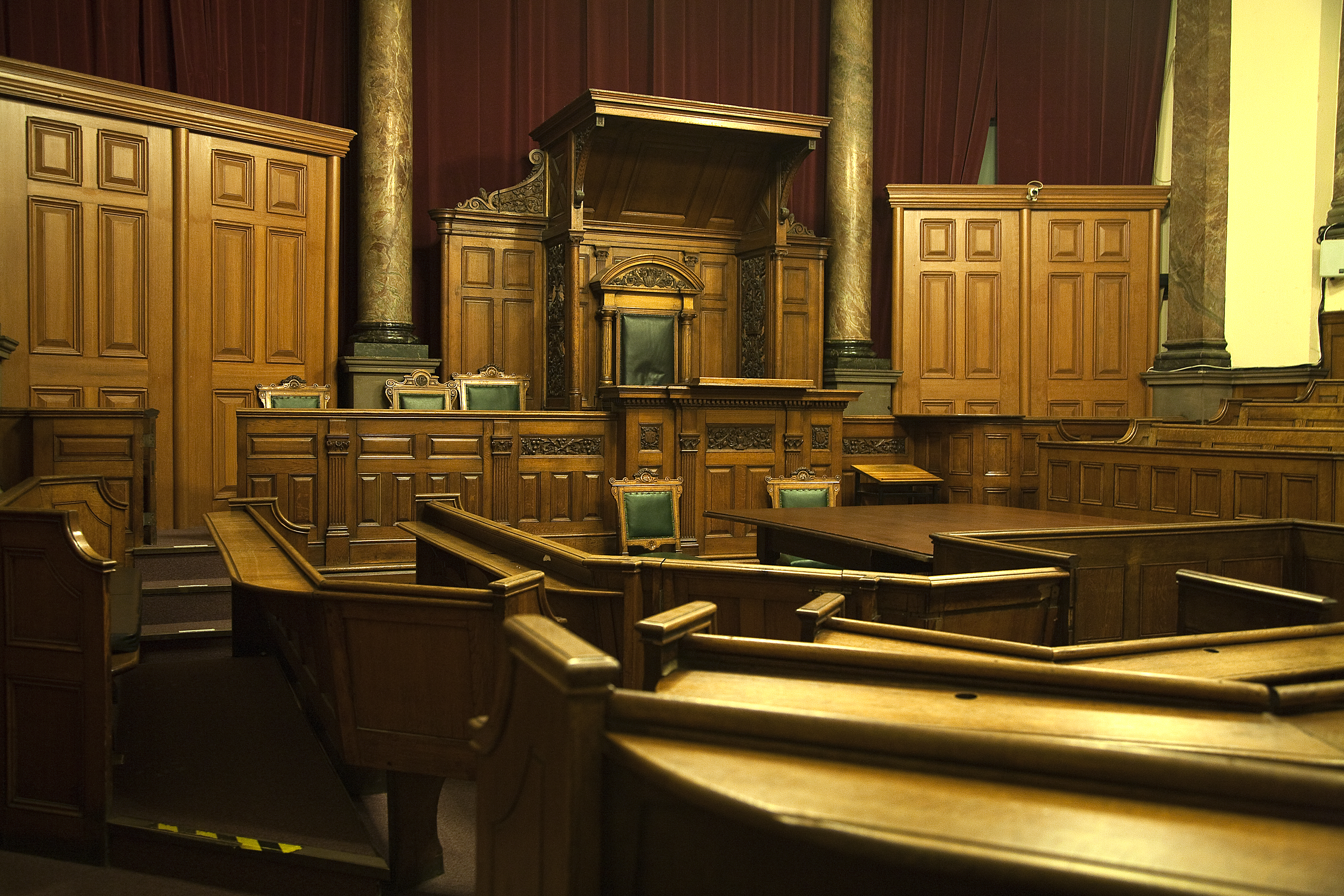
One of the two Victorian courtrooms.

=== Nineteenth century ===
Additional wings were added to the building between 1820 and 1840. Changes were made to the nisi prius court in 1833. The judges' retiring room, barristers' robing room and office for a clerk were added in 1844. A new grand jury room was added in 1859 to designs by the architect Richard Charles Sutton. Until 1832 most Nottingham hangings took place at Gallows Hill, but in 1832 they transferred to the Shire Hall. The last public execution was held in 1864, when Richard Thomas Parker was hanged.

Executions were held on a scaffold erected over the stone steps in front of the central doorway, within the small enclosure created by closing the gates of the iron railings. The drop was described as approximately level with the lintel of the door. Three small square stone insets in the steps are, in local legend, the sockets where the "Three-legged Mare" scaffold feet were set, but this design of scaffold was never used at Nottingham and the steps themselves post-date the 1876 fire (see below) and public hangings. After the abolition of public executions in 1868, most hangings took place at the Borough Gaol but on 21 November 1877 Thomas Gray was hanged in a yard at the rear of the Shire Hall.

In 1876, major improvements were made and the front was redesigned in an Italianate style by William Bliss Sanders of Nottingham. Within a few weeks, a fire broke out and nearly destroyed all of the newly completed work. Following the fire, the courts were largely rebuilt by Thomas Chambers Hine between 1876 and 1879; but the gaol was closed in 1878.

Following the implementation of the Local Government Act 1888, which established county councils in every county, the building also became the meeting place of Nottinghamshire County Council.

=== Twentieth century to date ===
A police station was built adjacent the building in 1905. After the County Council moved to County Hall (a larger and more modern complex located on the south bank of the River Trent) in 1954, the Shire Hall continued in use as the home of Nottingham's civil and criminal courts until 1991, when Nottingham Crown Court was opened on Canal Street.

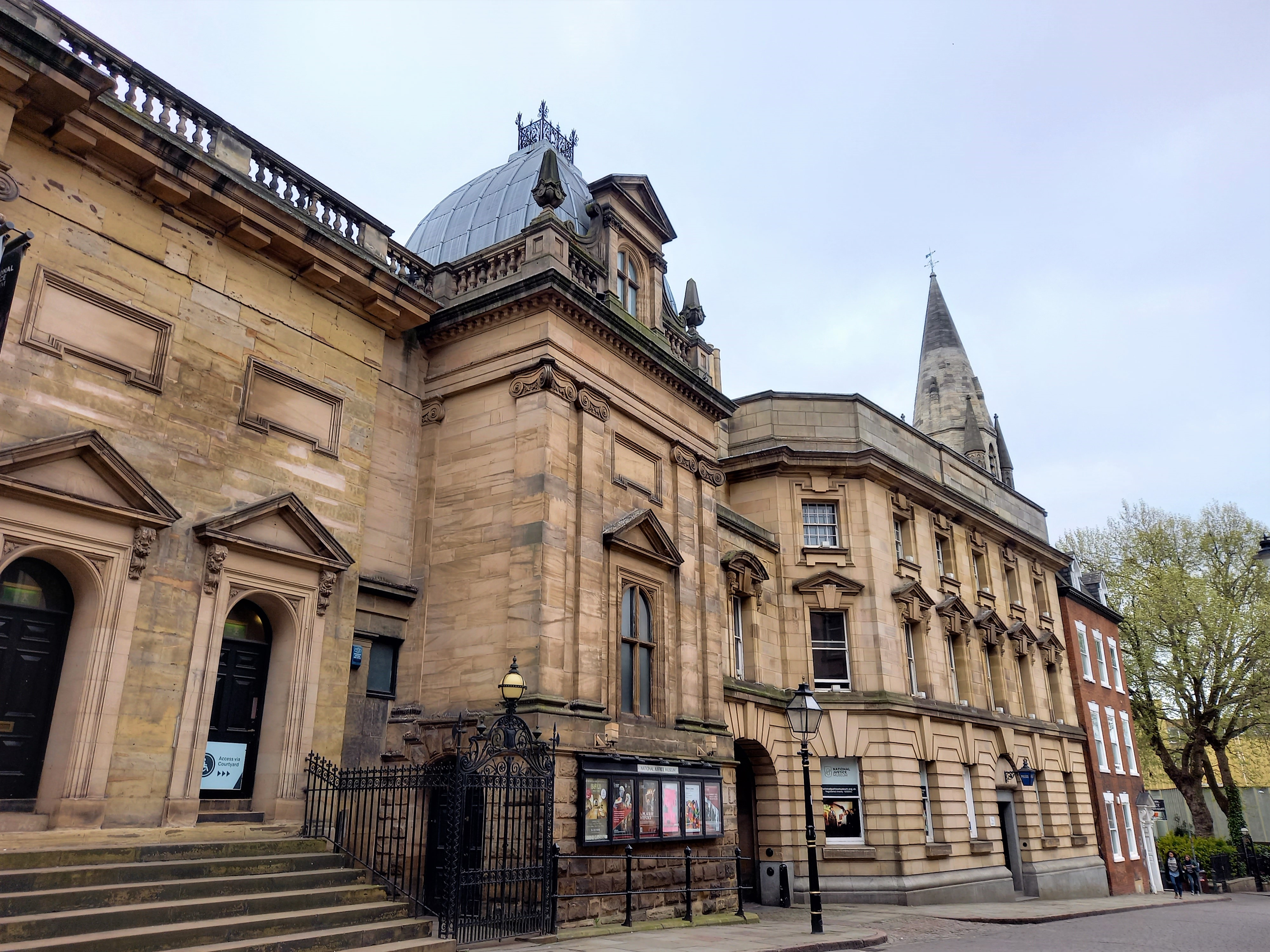
Entrance to the museum

The Galleries of Justice Museum opened in the building in 1995. It was refurbished and rebranded as the National Justice Museum in 2017. The building houses two courtrooms, an underground jail and a site used for executions.

== Exhibitions ==
The Crime Gallery includes a range of family activities, interactive exhibits and exhibitions exploring a range of topics relating to crime and punishment. The area also includes the dock from Bow Street Magistrates' Court.

== See also ==
- Grade II* listed buildings in Nottinghamshire
- Listed buildings in Nottingham (Bridge ward)
