= West Somerset District Council elections =

Local government elections in Somerset, England

Map showing the composition of West Somerset Council as of the last election in 2015. Conservatives in blue, independents in grey, UK Independence Party in purple and Labour in red.

West Somerset District Council in Somerset, England was elected every four years. The first elections to the council were held in 1973, ahead of it coming into being in 1974. The last election was held in 2015. The council was abolished in 2019 when the district merged with neighbouring Taunton Deane district to become Somerset West and Taunton. West Somerset had 28 councillors following its final boundary changes in 2011, 28 elected from 16 wards.

== Political control ==
From the first election to the council in 1973 until its abolition in 2019, political control of the council was held by the following parties:

| Party in control | Years |
|---|---|
| Independent | 1973–1995 |
| No overall control | 1995–2003 |
| Conservative | 2003–2007 |
| Independent | 2007–2011 |
| Conservative | 2011–2019 |

=== Leadership ===
The leaders of the council from 1998 to 2019 were:

| Councillor | Party | From | To |
|---|---|---|---|
| Steven Pugsley | Independent | 1998 | 2003 |
| Steven Pugsley | Conservative | 2003 | 2006 |
| Christine Lawrence | Conservative | 2006 | 2007 |
| Keith Ross | Independent | 2007 | 2010 |
| Tim Taylor | Conservative | 2010 | May 2015 |
| Anthony Trollope-Bellew | Conservative | 20 May 2015 | 31 Mar 2019 |

== Council elections ==
Summary of the council composition after each council election, click on the year for full details of each election.

| Year | Conservative | Independent | UK Independence Party | Labour | Liberal Democrats (including predecessor parties) | Independent Conservative | Residents | Vacant | Notes |
| 1973 | 3 | 27 | 0 | 1 | 1 | 0 | 0 | 0 | |
| 1976 | 4 | 28 | 0 | 0 | 0 | 0 | 0 | 0 | |
| 1979 | 3 | 25 | 0 | 0 | 1 | 0 | 3 | 0 | New ward boundaries |
| 1983 | 4 | 27 | 0 | 0 | 1 | 0 | 0 | 0 | |
| 1987 | 6 | 26 | 0 | 0 | 0 | 0 | 0 | 0 | |
| 1991 | 5 | 22 | 0 | 3 | 1 | 0 | 0 | 1 | |
| 1995 | 9 | 12 | 0 | 8 | 2 | 1 | 0 | 0 | |
| 1999 | 15 | 8 | 0 | 5 | 1 | 0 | 0 | 2 | New ward boundaries |
| 2003 | 18 | 9 | 0 | 2 | 2 | 0 | 0 | 0 | |
| 2007 | 13 | 16 | 0 | 1 | 1 | 0 | 0 | 0 | |
| 2011 | 19 | 7 | 0 | 2 | 0 | 0 | 0 | 0 | New ward boundaries |
| 2015 | 21 | 3 | 3 | 1 | 0 | 0 | 0 | 0 | |

== District result maps ==
1999 results map

2003 results map

2007 results map

2011 results map

2015 results map

== By-elections ==
By-elections occur when seats become vacant between council elections. Below is a summary of recent by-elections; full by-election results can be found by clicking on the by-election name.

| By-election | Date | Incumbent party | Winning party |
|---|---|---|---|
| Minehead South by-election | 14 November 1996 | Ind. Conservative | Conservative |
| Quantock Vale by-election | 17 July 1997 | Conservative | Independent |
| Minehead North by-election | 23 April 1998 | Independent | Conservative |
| Porlock and Oare by-election | 23 October 1998 | Conservative | Independent |
| Williton by-election | 8 December 1999 | Labour | Conservative |
| Aville Vale by-election | 13 July 2000 | Labour | Conservative |
| Old Cleeve by-election | 7 July 2005 | Independent | Independent |
| Alcombe East by-election | 1 May 2008 | Conservative | Conservative |
| Minehead South by-election | 16 April 2009 | Independent | Independent |
| Dunster and Timberscombe by-election | 23 March 2017 | Conservative | Liberal Democrats |
