= Church of St Mary, Stoke St Mary =

Church in Somerset, England

Church of St Mary
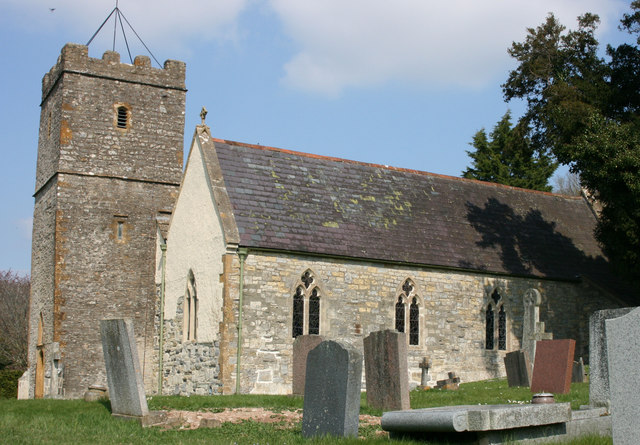

- Location within Somerset
- 50.9957°N 3.0476°W
- Location: Stoke St Mary, Somerset, England

History
- Built: 13th century

Listed Building – Grade II*
- Official name: Church of St Mary
- Designated: 25 February 1955
- Reference no.: 1177216

The Anglican Church of St Mary in Stoke St Mary, Somerset, England was built in the 13th century. It is a Grade II* listed building.

== History ==
The church was founded as a daughter of Church of St George, Ruishton, and they belonged to Taunton Priory.

The chancel, nave and tower are from the 13th century. The south aisle was added as part of Victorian restoration in 1864.

The parish of Stoke Saint Mary with Thurlbear is part of the Seven Sowers benefice which includes Beercrocombe, Curry Mallet, Hatch Beauchamp, Orchard Portman, Staple Fitzpaine and West Hatch. It is within the Diocese of Bath and Wells.

== Architecture ==
The church is built of blue Lias with hamstone dressings. It has a slate roof. The two-stage battlemented tower is supported by buttresses.

There is a war memorial consisting of brass plaques on the lid of the font.

== See also ==
- List of ecclesiastical parishes in the Diocese of Bath and Wells
