= Bickenhall =

Hamlet and civil parish in Somerset, England

Coordinates: 50.96051°N 3.02657°W

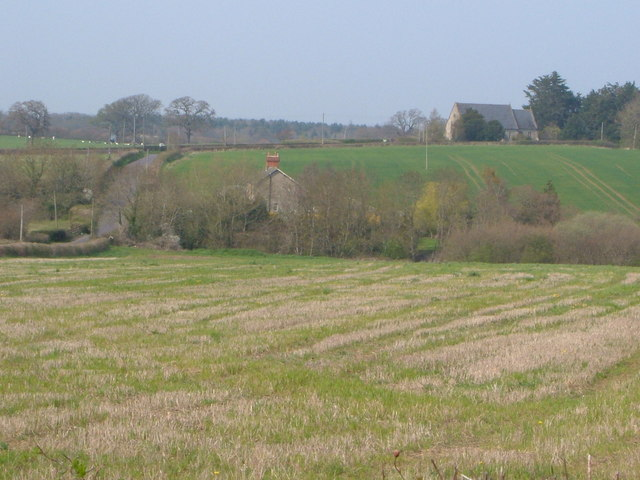
- Bickenhall, showing Neroche Parish Hall

- Location within Somerset
- Population: 122
- OS grid reference: ST280184
- Unitary authority: Somerset Council
- Ceremonial county: Somerset
- Region: South West
- Country: England
- Sovereign state: United Kingdom
- Post town: Taunton
- Postcode district: TA3
- Police: Avon and Somerset
- Fire: Devon and Somerset
- Ambulance: South Western
- UK Parliament: Taunton and Wellington

Bickenhall is a hamlet and parish in Somerset, England, situated 5 miles (8.0 km) south east of Taunton. The parish, which includes the hamlet of Batten's Green, has a population of 122.

Bickenhall is a widely scattered hamlet lying between the A358 and the village of Staple Fitzpaine.

The village consists of farms, houses and smallholdings. It has no shops or pubs, barring a recently opened sculpture studio at Bickenhall Farm. Bickenhall is also home to Neroche Parish Hall, formerly St. Paul's Church (though has the appearance of a Methodist type church rather than one with a tower).

== History ==
The name of the village comes from Bica's hall or hill. The manor was held by Robert, Count of Mortain at the time of the Domesday Book in 1086. It later passed to the Portman family of Orchard Portman, who founded the Portman Estate.

Bickenhall was part of the hundred of Abdick and Bulstone.

Bickenhall was a haunt of smugglers at various times in the past. Aptly named Brandy Bridge in Bickenhall was the location of the "Cat and Rags" pub, which was used as a stop-off for goods smuggled from the south Dorset coast.

The village was once larger than the neighbouring Staple Fitzpaine due to a roaring trade in Teasels that were used in the wool trade but in the 19th century this declined dramatically and as a result many homes became derelict and are now only seen as stones in many of the fields. The Portland Estate that dominated the area also accommodated a manor house within the parish that sadly went the same way as the village homes. The land is generally now owned by The Crown and cultivated by a number of farms including arable and more recently a growth in Equestrian activities taking full use of the Bridlways and droves.

== Churches ==
Formerly Bickenhall had its own traditional-style village church, similar to those in nearby West Hatch and Hatch Beauchamp. This fell into disrepair however and was pulled down in around 1843, and was replaced by the current Neroche Parish Hall. The graveyard of the old church remains and can be seen by the roadside.

A local ghost story stems from the above church changes. Sixteenth-century local landowner Rachel Portman lived nearby and is buried at the old church. She was commemorated inside the church by a large, wall-mounted relief statue which is now to be seen inside Staple Fitzpaine church. However, it is said that the demolition of her local church angered her spirit, and that now she can be seen to ride each midnight from the site of the old church to Neroche Parish Hall, upon a horse.

== Governance ==
The parish council has responsibility for local issues, including setting an annual precept (local rate) to cover the council's operating costs and producing annual accounts for public scrutiny. The parish council evaluates local planning applications and works with the local police, district council officers, and neighbourhood watch groups on matters of crime, security, and traffic. The parish council's role also includes initiating projects for the maintenance and repair of parish facilities, as well as consulting with the district council on the maintenance, repair, and improvement of highways, drainage, footpaths, public transport, and street cleaning. Conservation matters (including trees and listed buildings) and environmental issues are also the responsibility of the council.

For local government purposes, since 1 April 2023, the village comes under the unitary authority of Somerset Council. Prior to this, it was part of the non-metropolitan district of Somerset West and Taunton (formed on 1 April 2019) and, before this, the district of Taunton Deane (established under the Local Government Act 1972). It was part of Taunton Rural District before that.

Bickenhall is also part of the Taunton and Wellington county constituency represented in the House of Commons of the Parliament of the United Kingdom. It elects one Member of Parliament (MP) by the first past the post system of election. It was part of the South West England constituency of the European Parliament prior to Britain leaving the European Union in January 2020, which elected seven MEPs using the d'Hondt method of party-list proportional representation.

== Geography ==
Bickenhall Orchard is a 0.6 hectares (1.5 acres) local nature reserve. It consists of Apple trees with mistletoe in a grass orchard with herbs and orchids.

Approximately .5 miles (0.8 km) south east of the village is the Barrington Hill Meadows biological Site of Special Scientific Interest.
