= Tolland, Somerset =

Village and civil parish in Somerset, England

Coordinates: 51.0848°N 3.2791°W

Tolland
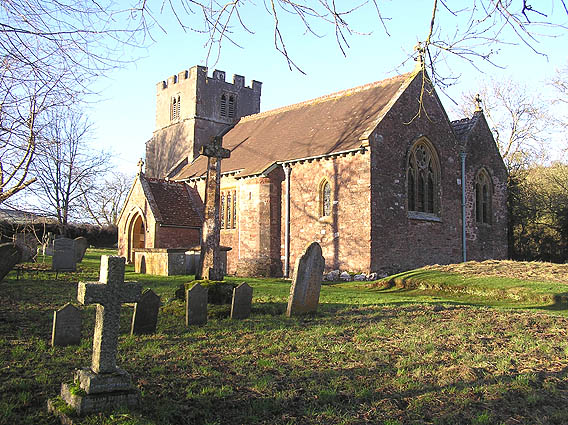
- Church of St John the Baptist, Tolland

- Location within Somerset
- Population: 61 (2001)
- OS grid reference: ST105325
- Unitary authority: Somerset Council
- Ceremonial county: Somerset
- Region: South West
- Country: England
- Sovereign state: United Kingdom
- Post town: TAUNTON
- Postcode district: TA4
- Dialling code: 01984
- Police: Avon and Somerset
- Fire: Devon and Somerset
- Ambulance: South Western
- UK Parliament: Tiverton and Minehead

Tolland is a village and civil parish in Somerset, England, situated 9 miles (14.5 km) north west of Taunton, between the Brendon Hills and Quantock Hills. The parish has a population of 81.

== History ==
The parish of Tolland was part of the Taunton Deane Hundred.

Tolland County in Connecticut, USA is named after the village. The connection was Henry Wolcott who emigrated to America and founded a prominent family which included Oliver Wolcott who signed the United States Declaration of Independence.

== Governance ==
The parish council has responsibility for local issues, including setting an annual precept (local rate) to cover the council's operating costs and producing annual accounts for public scrutiny. The parish council evaluates local planning applications and works with the local police, district council officers, and neighbourhood watch groups on matters of crime, security, and traffic. The parish council's role also includes initiating projects for the maintenance and repair of parish facilities, as well as consulting with the district council on the maintenance, repair, and improvement of highways, drainage, footpaths, public transport, and street cleaning. Conservation matters (including trees and listed buildings) and environmental issues are also the responsibility of the council.

For local government purposes, since 1 April 2023, the village comes under the unitary authority of Somerset Council. Prior to this, it was part of the non-metropolitan district of Somerset West and Taunton (formed on 1 April 2019) and, before this, the district of Taunton Deane (established under the Local Government Act 1972). From 1894-1974, for local government purposes, Tolland was part of Taunton Rural District.

It is also part of the Tiverton and Minehead county constituency represented in the House of Commons of the Parliament of the United Kingdom. It elects one Member of Parliament (MP) by the first past the post system of election.

== Landmarks ==
Gaulden Manor to the southeast was built in the 16th century and has been designated as a Grade II* listed building, also the 13th century church set in the woods at the south end of the village.

== Religious sites ==
The Church of St John the Baptist was built in the 13th century and remodelled in 1871. The church was given to the Knights Hospitaller to support Buckland Priory, Durston in 1180. After the dissolution of the monasteries in 1539 the property was held by the crown.
