= Peasmarsh (disambiguation) =

Peasmarsh is a village in East Sussex, England.

Peasmarsh may also refer to 2 other places in England:

- Peasmarsh, Somerset, near Ilminster
- Peasmarsh, Surrey, near Shalford
