= Stoke St Mary =

Village in Somerset, England

Coordinates: 50.9952°N 3.0510°W

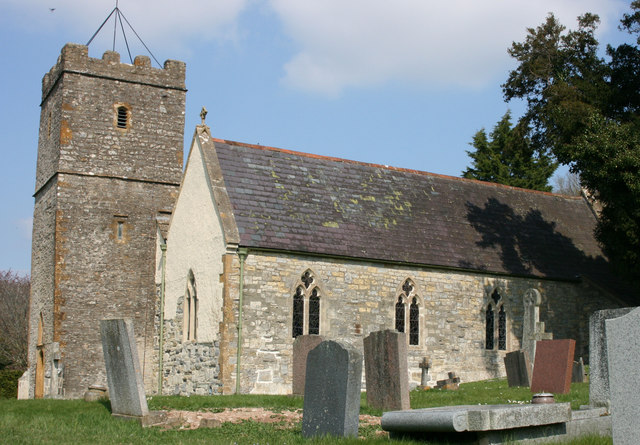
- Stoke St Mary church

- Location within Somerset
- Population: 421 (2011)
- OS grid reference: ST262223
- Unitary authority: Somerset Council
- Ceremonial county: Somerset
- Region: South West
- Country: England
- Sovereign state: United Kingdom
- Post town: TAUNTON
- Postcode district: TA3
- Dialling code: 01823
- Police: Avon and Somerset
- Fire: Devon and Somerset
- Ambulance: South Western
- UK Parliament: Taunton and Wellington

Stoke St Mary is a village and civil parish in Somerset, England, situated 2 miles (3.2 km) south east of Taunton.

== History ==
The earliest recorded mention of Stoke St Mary is in a Saxon charter dated 854 AD, when a West Saxon king gave the clearly defined lands at ‘Stoc’ to the minster church at Taunton.

The parish of Stoke St Mary was part of the Taunton Deane Hundred.

The Church of St Mary in Stoke St Mary was built in the 13th century and is a simple stone building with battlemented tower. It remains largely unchanged today and the tower is one of the few remaining 13th-century towers in the county. Agriculture has always been the main occupation in Stoke St Mary but in the 17th century the cloth industry became important in the village and limeburners were common, most working quarries on Stoke Hill. The parish of Stoke St Mary also became famous for its cider and although it is no longer produced in the village, Taunton remains well known for it. Over the last 20 years the village has changed dramatically with the decline of agriculture and it has become mostly a dormitory village. The village has also grown with the building of new houses, which continues.

== Governance ==
The parish council has responsibility for local issues, including setting an annual precept (local rate) to cover the council's operating costs and producing annual accounts for public scrutiny. The parish council evaluates local planning applications and works with the local police, district council officers, and neighbourhood watch groups on matters of crime, security, and traffic. The parish council's role also includes initiating projects for the maintenance and repair of parish facilities, as well as consulting with the district council on the maintenance, repair, and improvement of highways, drainage, footpaths, public transport, and street cleaning. Conservation matters (including trees and listed buildings) and environmental issues are also the responsibility of the council.

For local government purposes, since 1 April 2023, the village comes under the unitary authority of Somerset Council. Prior to this, it was part of the non-metropolitan district of Somerset West and Taunton (formed on 1 April 2019) and, before this, the district of Taunton Deane (established under the Local Government Act 1972). From 1894 to 1974, for local government purposes, Stoke St Mary was part of Taunton Rural District.

It is also part of the Taunton and Wellington county constituency represented in the House of Commons of the Parliament of the United Kingdom. It elects one Member of Parliament (MP) by the first past the post system of election.

== Transport ==
Despite its rural setting, Stoke St Mary is very well connected. It is about a mile from the A358 and only two miles from the M5. The nearest railway station is two miles away in Taunton, which is on the main line between Exeter and Bristol.

== Politics ==
The village is part of the Taunton and Wellington parliamentary constituency, for which Rebecca Pow (Conservative), who resides in Stoke St Mary, served as M.P. between 2015 and 2024.
