= Gaulden Manor =

- Location within Somerset
- 51°04′42″N 03°16′15″W
- Location: Tolland, Somerset, England

History
- Built: 16th century

Listed Building – Grade II*
- Official name: Gaulden Manor
- Designated: 25 February 1955
- Reference no.: 1307623

Gaulden Manor (also Gavelden or Gaveldene) is a Grade II* listed country house to the southeast of Tolland, Somerset, England. It is a double storied building with interior plasterwork, as well as a garden consisting of herbs, old roses and a pond. A room referred to as a chapel has a c.1640 ceiling featuring an angel with trumpet on Judgment Day.

== History ==
In 1199, Andrew De Bovedon gave Gaulden to Taunton Priory. It was a settlement in the mid-thirteenth century. During the Valor Ecclesiasticus (1535), Gaulden was listed as belonging to the priory. The priory's possessions were surrendered to King Henry VIII in 1539, and that the manor was granted to William Standysh in 1544. On his death in 1553, the manor passed to Francis Southwell and Alice, his wife. As they left no heirs, it became the possession of John Mynne, and then George Mynne and Elizabeth, his wife. In 1565, James Turberville, the former Bishop of Exeter, lived at the manor. Either Turberville or his great-nephew, John Turberville, added the plasterwork. Built from limestone with rough stone walls, the house is dated to the 16th century but underwent alterations in the 17th century; much of the plasterwork is dated to 1640–1660.

== Architecture and fittings ==
Built of red sandstone and masonry, it is a double storied building. The roof is partly of slate and partly of brick. There is a gabled porch. The front entrance is on the west side. The porch contains a lintel and there is a storey over it. It opens into a passage. A hall and a service wing are at a lower level. The hall is situated on the right a features a ceiling of panelled plaster. There is a notable pendant with eight ornamental flutings, more than 30 by 15 feet (9.1 m × 4.6 m). A cornice surrounds the room, except in the area of the fireplace and the carved partition. The partition's cornice, made of plaster, is ornamented with figures and mottoes. On the north wall are two figures—a man apparently giving a cloak to a poor man or monk. Further on, a representation of Herodias' daughter bringing John the Baptist's head to Herod, with the decapitated body in the background. To the left of the fireplace, between it and the square-headed and stone-mullioned window, is an oak partition, panelled and carved, surmounted by a plaster partition between it and the ceiling, and over the door are the initials "I. T." Inside the partition is a room referred to as a chapel, though it has the appearance of an ordinary parlour or drawing room, with nothing ecclesiastic in its features. The c. 1640 ceiling features an angel with trumpet on Judgement Day.

== Grounds ==
The grounds contain a bog, herb garden, fish pond, and a collection of old roses. The herb garden is laid out in the shape of a cross. From 1967, Mr and Mrs James le Gendre Starkie laid out 3 acres (1.2 ha) of wasteland in a similar manner to that which have been in place at the time of the Tudor house. The property and grounds are now owned and maintained by Mark Homewood. Primulas are a special feature of the planting.
