= Church of St Andrew, Puckington =

Church in Somerset, England

Church of St Andrew
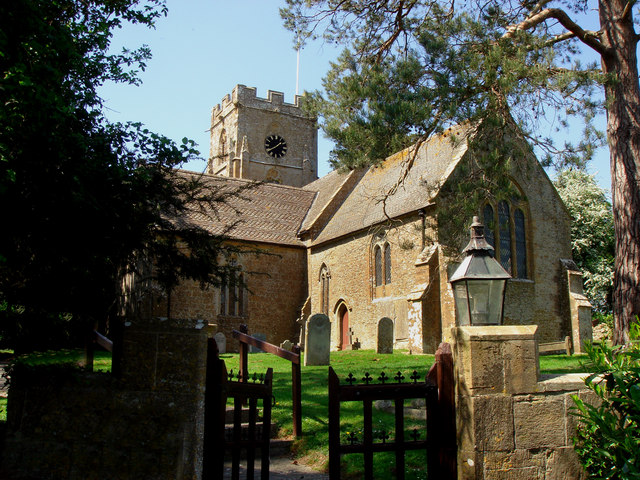

- Location within Somerset
- 50.9606°N 2.8884°W
- Location: Puckington, Somerset, England

History
- Built: 13th Century

Listed Building – Grade II*
- Official name: Church of St Andrew
- Designated: 17 April 1959
- Reference no.: 1057727

The Anglican Church of St Andrew in Puckington, Somerset, England, was built in the 13th century. It is a Grade II* listed building.

== History ==
The church was built in the 13th century and revised in the 15th. A Victorian restoration in the mid 19th century added the south transept.

The parish is part of the Winsmoor benefice within the Diocese of Bath and Wells.

== Architecture ==
The stone building consists of a two-bay nave, two-bay chancel, transept, and a porch on the southern side with a small vestry on the north. Its three-stage tower is supported by set-back buttresses. It has a tiled roof adorned with gargoyles and battlements with pinnacles. Inside the church is a 13th-century piscina and sedilia.

== See also ==
- List of ecclesiastical parishes in the Diocese of Bath and Wells
