= William Portman Almshouses =

Almshouse in Staple Fitzpaine, Somerset

- Location within Somerset
- 50.9593°N 3.0493°W
- Location: Staple Fitzpaine, Somerset, England

History
- Built: 1643

Listed Building – Grade II*
- Official name: Almshouses
- Designated: 25 February 1955
- Reference no.: 1060273

The William Portman Almshouses in Staple Fitzpaine, Somerset, England was built in 1643. It is a Grade II* listed building.

== History ==
The almshouses were established by Sir William Portman in 1643 to provide housing for six poor people. In April 1640, Portman was elected Member of Parliament for Taunton for the Short Parliament. He was re-elected for Taunton in November 1640 for the Long Parliament where he sat until February 1644 when he was disabled for supporting the Royalists He gave £40 per year from his Orchard Portman estate for the six "poor persons" dwelling in the almshouse.

The historical records of the almshouses are held by the South West Heritage Trust.

The building was restored in the 1970s when some of the windows were replaced and a new staircase added. It is still run as a charity providing housing.

== Architecture ==
The building is of Blue Lias with hamstone dressings and a slate roof.
