= Castle Neroche =

Norman castle in Somerset, England

- Near Staple Fitzpaine, Somerset, England
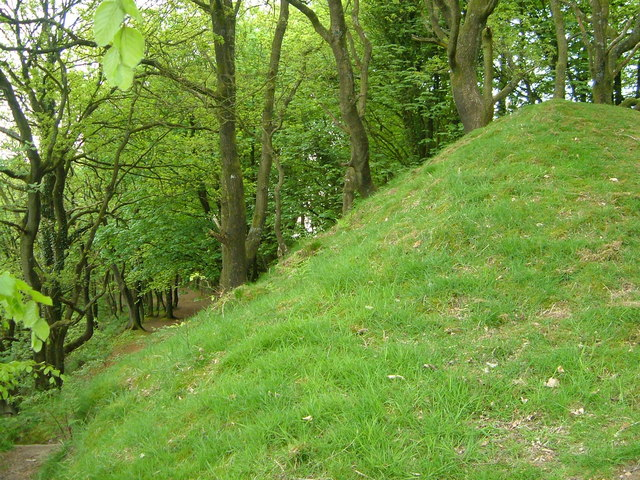
- Eastern earthworks at Castle Neroche

Site information
- Type: Motte and bailey on Bronze Age site

Location
- Shown within Somerset
- Coordinates: 50.9370°N 3.0374°W
- Grid reference: grid reference ST272158

Castle Neroche is a Norman motte-and-bailey castle on the site of an earlier hill fort in the parish of Curland, near Staple Fitzpaine, Somerset, England. It is a Scheduled Ancient Monument.

== Location ==
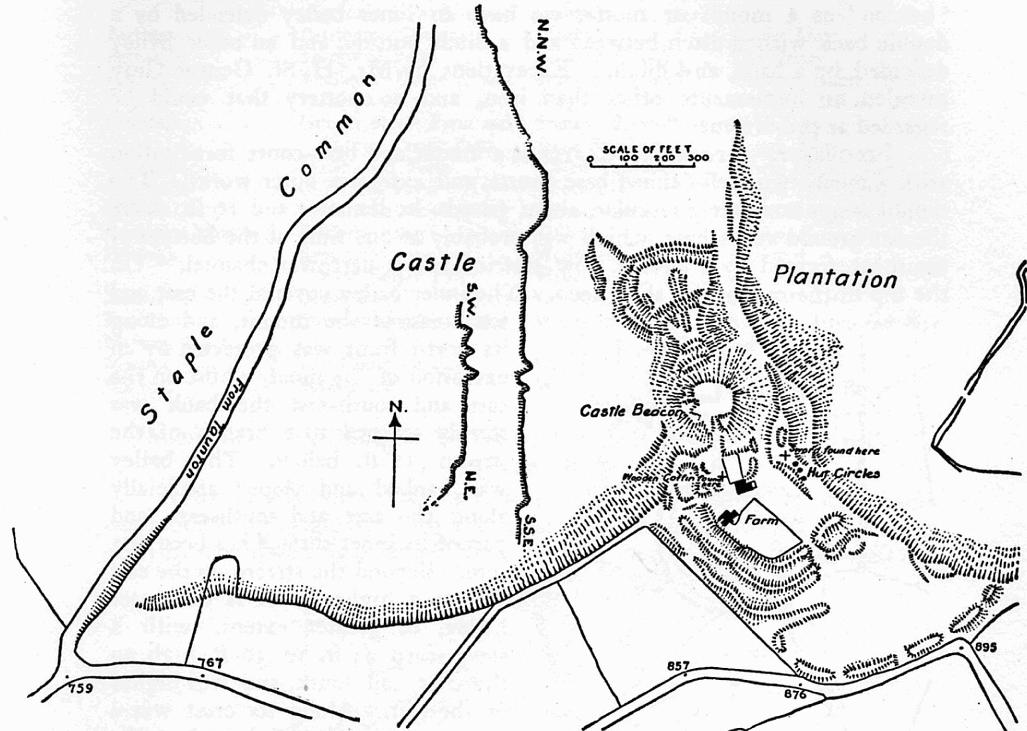
Sketch map of the castle site

The hill rises to 260 metres (850 ft) on the northern escarpment of the Blackdown Hills. The area is part of a 35 square miles (91 km^{2}) site covered by a landscape partnership, known as the Neroche Scheme, which is establishing trails and a public forest. It is managed by Forestry England and supported by the Heritage Lottery Fund and local organisations.

== History ==
The origin of the term Neroche is believed to be a contraction of the Old English words nierra and rechich or rachich for Rache, a type of hunting-dog used in Britain in the Middle Ages, giving a meaning of the camp where hunting dogs were kept. This also gives the site its alternative name of Castle Rache.

=== Iron Age ===
The reason for the construction of Iron Age hill forts has been a subject of debate. It has been argued that they could have been military sites constructed in response to invasion from continental Europe, sites built by invaders, or a military reaction to social tensions caused by an increasing population and consequent pressure on agriculture. The dominant view since the 1960s has been that the increasing use of iron led to social changes in Britain. Deposits of iron ore were separated from the sources of tin and copper necessary to make bronze, and as a result trading patterns shifted and the old elites lost their economic and social status. Archaeologist Barry Cunliffe believes that population increase played a role and has stated "[the forts] provided defensive possibilities for the community at those times when the stress [of an increasing population] burst out into open warfare. But I wouldn't see them as having been built because there was a state of war. They would be functional as defensive strongholds when there were tensions and undoubtedly some of them were attacked and destroyed, but this was not the only, or even the most significant, factor in their construction".

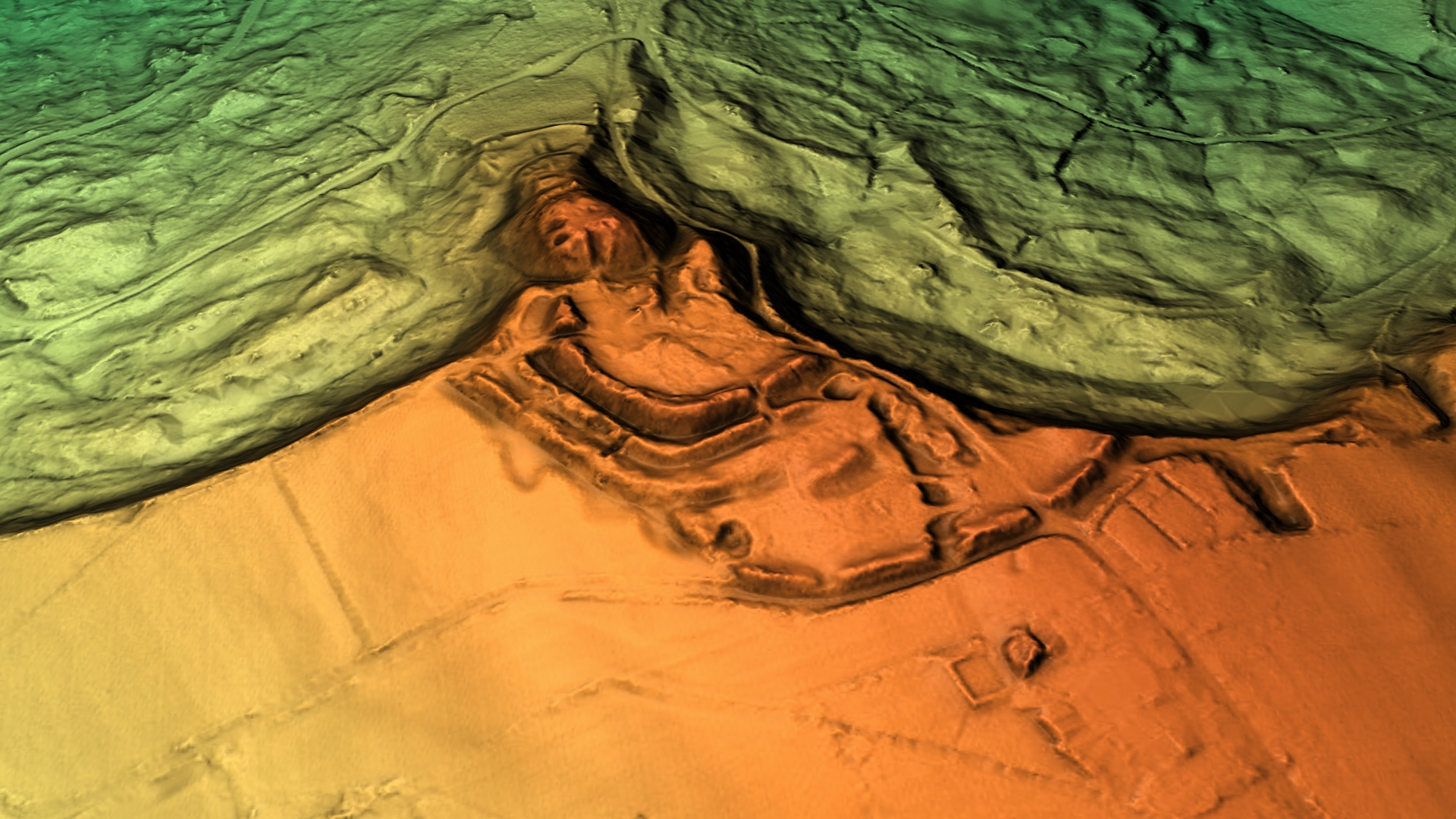
3D view of the digital terrain model

There is little evidence of Iron Age remains at Castle Neroche, although the situation and shape of the site matches other Iron Age enclosures. There is some indication that the site was strengthened with an additional rampart and outer enclosure. The site was excavated by Harold St George Gray in 1903. There have also been nearby archaeological finds of Mesolithic flints, and a Bronze Age copper axe found in 1857, but nothing from the Iron Age or Roman periods.

=== Norman castle ===
The earthworks at the site are larger than would normally be found in a castle from the Norman period, raising speculation that it reused previously developed features.

The castle was probably built by Robert, Count of Mortain in the 11th century. Archaeological evidence suggests it was built in several stages. During the first a rampart enclosing 7.5 acres (3.0 ha) was built. Soon after the Norman Conquest in 1066 a smaller inner ringwork was constructed. The site was later converted into a motte and bailey, with a corner of the 20 feet (6.1 m) high motte serving as a barbican.

By the early 12th century the castle was no longer in regular use. However, its use was resumed during The Anarchy, a period of civil war and unsettled government during a succession dispute between the supporters of King Stephen (1135–1154) and those of his cousin, the Empress Matilda. Continued use in the later 12th century may have been by administrators of the surrounding royal forest as a base for operations against poachers.

== Air disaster ==
On 22 November 1945, a Royal Air Force Consolidated B-24 Liberator crashed into a field after hitting trees on Blackdown Hills between the castle and Buckland St Mary, killing all 27 people on board.

== See also ==
- Castles in Great Britain and Ireland
- List of castles in England
