= All Saints Church, Curland =

Church in Somerset, England

All Saints Church
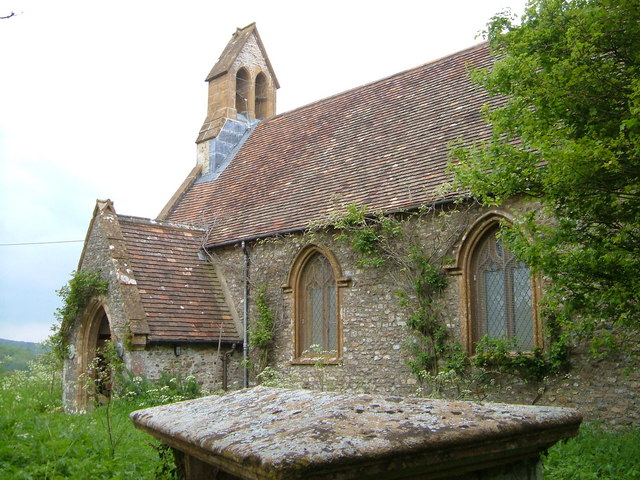

Religion
- Affiliation: Church of England
- Ecclesiastical or organizational status: Closed

Location
- Location: Curland, Somerset, England
- Interactive map of All Saints Church
- Coordinates: 50.9465°N 3.0395°W

Architecture
- Architect: Benjamin Ferrey
- Type: Church
- Completed: 1856

All Saints Church is a former Church of England parish church in Curland, Somerset, England. Designed by Benjamin Ferrey, it was built in 1855–56 to replace an earlier church on the same site and became redundant in 1972. The church, now a private residence, has been a Grade II listed building since 1955. In the churchyard, an early 18th century chest tomb of the Slade family also became Grade II listed in 1986.

== History ==
All Saints was built in 1855–56 to replace Curland's parish church, which had become dilapidated. Plans for the new church were drawn up by Benjamin Ferrey and its construction largely paid for by Rev. Prebendary Lance, the rector of Buckland St Mary, alongside public subscription. The committee of the diocese's Church Building Association also granted £60 towards the estimated £420 cost of the church in 1855.

The foundation stone was laid on 28 August 1855 by Rev. Charles Leigh Pemberton, the rector of Curry Mallet and Curland. The church was rebuilt from the foundations, with Mr. H. Davis of Taunton as the contractor and Mr. J. Billing of Buckland St Mary as the supervisor. Stonework from the Curland's previous church was reused and additional stone salvaged from the chancel of the church at Buckland St Mary, which at the time was also undergoing reconstruction according to designs by Ferrey.

All Saints reopened on 28 October 1856. As the new church was constructed according to the exact shape of its predecessor, reconsecration was not necessary. It remained a place of worship until it was declared redundant on 27 October 1972. The church was used for storage from 1974 and later converted to residential use in 1991.

== Architecture ==
All Saints is built of flint with dressings of Hamstone and a clay tile roof, in the Perpendicular style. The west three-light window and four of the five side two-light windows were sourced from the chancel of Buckland St Mary's church. The east three-light window was new and fitted with glass by James Powell and Sons of Whitefriars. The church was designed to accommodate 70 persons and made up of three-bay nave, chancel and south porch. A small bell-turret for two bells was added to the west gable.

The low pitched roof was built of stained deal and the altar laid with encaustic tiles. The pulpit and reading desk were made of stained oak. The glazing work was carried out by Mr. Gould of Chard, the painting and diaper work of the reredos by Mr. A. Stansell of Taunton and the tablets containing the commandments (gifted by Mr. J. Stephens of Musgrove) was engraved by Mr. T. D. Ward of Taunton.
