= Taunton Rural District =

Former local government area in the UK

Coordinates: 51.019°N 3.100°W

- Area
  - 1911: 71,720 acres (290.2 km^{2})
  - 1961: 70,534 acres (285.44 km^{2})
- Population
  - 1911: 17,834
  - 1961: 22,204
- History
  - Created: 1894
  - Abolished: 1974
- Status: Rural district

Taunton was a rural district in Somerset, England, from 1894 to 1974.

It was created in 1894 under the Local Government Act 1894.

In 1974 it was abolished under the Local Government Act 1972 when it became part of Taunton Deane district.

The parishes which were in the rural district included Ash Priors, Bickenhall, Bishop's Hull, Bishops Lydeard, Burrowbridge, Cheddon Fitzpaine, Churchstanton, Combe Florey, Comeytrowe, Corfe, Cothelstone, Creech St Michael, Curland, Durston, Halse, Hatch Beauchamp, Kingston St Mary, Lydeard St Lawrence, North Curry, Norton Fitzwarren, Orchard Portman, Otterford, Pitminster, Ruishton, Staple Fitzpaine, Staplegrove, Stoke St Gregory, Stoke St Mary, Thornfalcon, Tolland, Somerset, Trull, West Bagborough, West Hatch and West Monkton.
