= Puckington =

Village in Somerset, England

Coordinates: 50.9625°N 2.8913°W

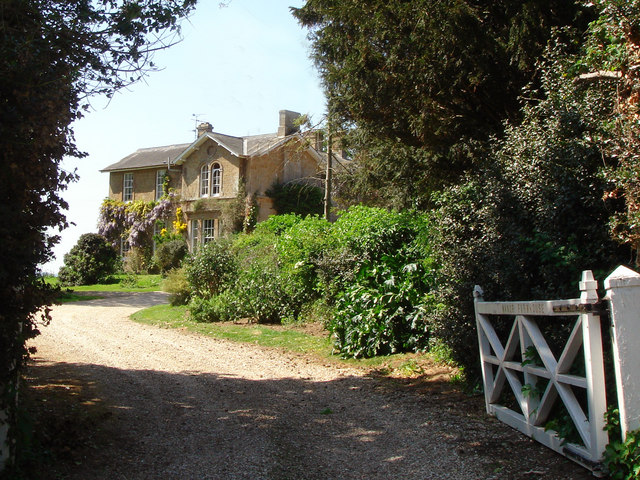
- Manor Farmhouse

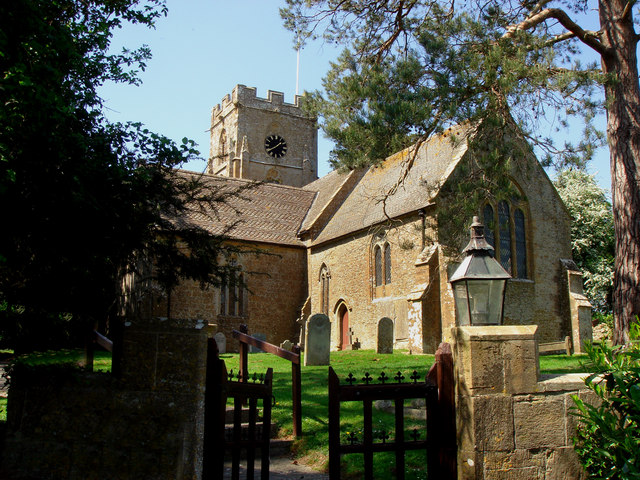
- St Andrews Church

- Location within Somerset
- Population: 117 (2011)
- OS grid reference: ST375185
- Unitary authority: Somerset
- Ceremonial county: Somerset
- Region: South West
- Country: England
- Sovereign state: United Kingdom
- Post town: ILMINSTER
- Postcode district: TA19
- Dialling code: 01460
- Police: Avon and Somerset
- Fire: Devon and Somerset
- Ambulance: South Western
- UK Parliament: Glastonbury and Somerton

Puckington is a village and civil parish, situated 10 miles (16 km) south-east of Taunton and 10 miles (16 km) west of Yeovil in Somerset, England. The parish includes the hamlet of South Bradon. In 2011 the parish had a population of 117.

== History ==
The name of the village means the settlement of Puca's people.

Before the Norman Conquest the manor was held under Muchelney Abbey but after 1066 was taken over by Roger de Courcelles. It was subsequently held by a succession of families until the execution of the Duke of Suffolk in 1553 when it reverted to the Crown, and sold to the Portmans of Orchard Portman.

Puckington was part of the hundred of Abdick and Bulstone.

== Governance ==
The parish council has responsibility for local issues, including setting an annual precept (local rate) to cover the council's operating costs.

Until 2023 it was the Non-metropolitan district of South Somerset, which was formed on 1 April 1974 under the Local Government Act 1972, having previously been part of Langport Rural District.

Somerset Council is responsible for running the largest and most expensive local services such as education, social services, libraries, main roads, public transport, policing and fire services, trading standards, waste disposal and strategic planning.

It is also part of the Glastonbury and Somerton county constituency represented in the House of Commons of the Parliament of the United Kingdom. It elects one Member of Parliament (MP) by the first past the post system of election.

== Religious sites ==
The Church of St Andrew dates from the 13th century and has been designated by English Heritage as a Grade II* listed building.
