= Sampford Arundel =

Village and civil parish in Somerset, England

Coordinates: 50.959°N 3.276°W

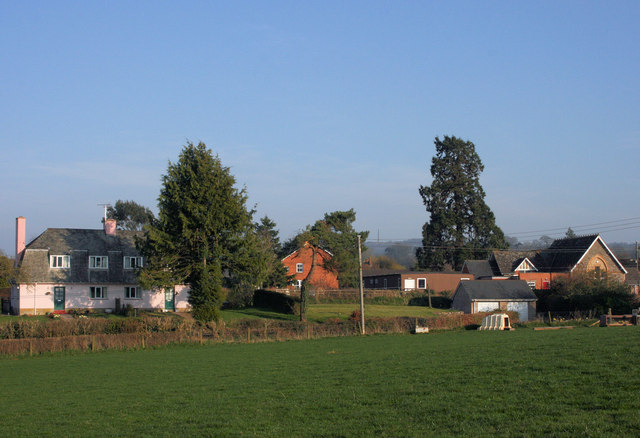

- Location within Somerset
- Population: 294 (2021)
- OS grid reference: ST105185
- Unitary authority: Somerset Council
- Ceremonial county: Somerset
- Region: South West
- Country: England
- Sovereign state: United Kingdom
- Post town: WELLINGTON
- Postcode district: TA21
- Dialling code: 01823
- Police: Avon and Somerset
- Fire: Devon and Somerset
- Ambulance: South Western
- UK Parliament: Taunton and Wellington
- Website: Parish Council

Sampford Arundel is a village and civil parish in Somerset, England, which lies south-west of Wellington and 10 miles (16 km) south-west of Taunton. The parish, which is at the western end of the Blackdown Hills, includes the hamlets of Sampford Moor, White Ball and Beam Bridge. At the 2021 census it had a population of 294.

== History ==
The Domesday survey of 1086 recorded a settlement with 22 households.

The first part of the name 'Sampford' means "sandy ford" and the second part commemorates Roger Arundel, who was granted the manor by the time the 1086 was made. This serves to differentiate the village from Sampford Brett.

The parish was part of the Milverton hundred.

Beam Bridge, just north of the village, was the temporary terminus of the Bristol and Exeter Railway from 1843 until the line was completed to Exeter in 1844.

== Governance ==
The parish council has responsibility for local issues, including setting an annual precept (local rate) to cover the council’s operating costs and producing annual accounts for public scrutiny. The parish council evaluates local planning applications and works with the local police, district council officers, and neighbourhood watch groups on matters of crime, security, and traffic. The parish council's role also includes initiating projects for the maintenance and repair of parish facilities, as well as consulting with the district council on the maintenance, repair, and improvement of highways, drainage, footpaths, public transport, and street cleaning. Conservation matters (including trees and listed buildings) and environmental issues are also the responsibility of the council.a

For local government purposes, since 1 April 2023, the village comes under the unitary authority of Somerset Council. Prior to this, it was part of the non-metropolitan district of Somerset West and Taunton (formed on 1 April 2019) and, before this, the district of Taunton Deane (established under the Local Government Act 1972). From 1894 to 1974, for local government purposes, Sampford Arundel was part of Wellington Rural District.

The parish is within the Taunton and Wellington county constituency represented in the House of Commons of the Parliament of the United Kingdom. It elects one Member of Parliament (MP) by the first past the post system of election.

== Religious sites ==
The Anglican parish church of the Holy Cross has fourteenth-century origins and a fifteenth-century tower; the rest was largely rebuilt, and the tower restored, in the 1870s. It has been designated as a Grade II listed building. The church was given by the Arundels to Canonsleigh Priory which retained it until the dissolution of the monasteries.

== Amenities ==
There is a small village school, Sampford Arundel Primary School.
