= Durston (surname) =

Durston is an English toponymic surname. The name was first recorded in 1641 in A Somerset Petition of 1641. The name is taken from the village of Durston in Somerset. It is derived from the Old English: deór-tún, a combination of "deer" (deór) and "fenced enclosure" (tún). The most likely interpretation is "deer park".

== People ==
- Adrian Durston (born 1975), Welsh rugby union player
- Albert Durston (1894–1959), RAF officer, Deputy Chief of the Air Staff
- David E. Durston (1921–2010), American screenwriter and film director
- Jack Durston (1893–1965), English cricketer
- Wes Durston (born 1980), English cricketer

== Fictional characters ==
- Colonel George Durston, pseudonym for various ghostwriters of Saalfield Publishing
