= Barrington Hill Meadows =

Protected area in Somerset, England

- Site of Special Scientific Interest
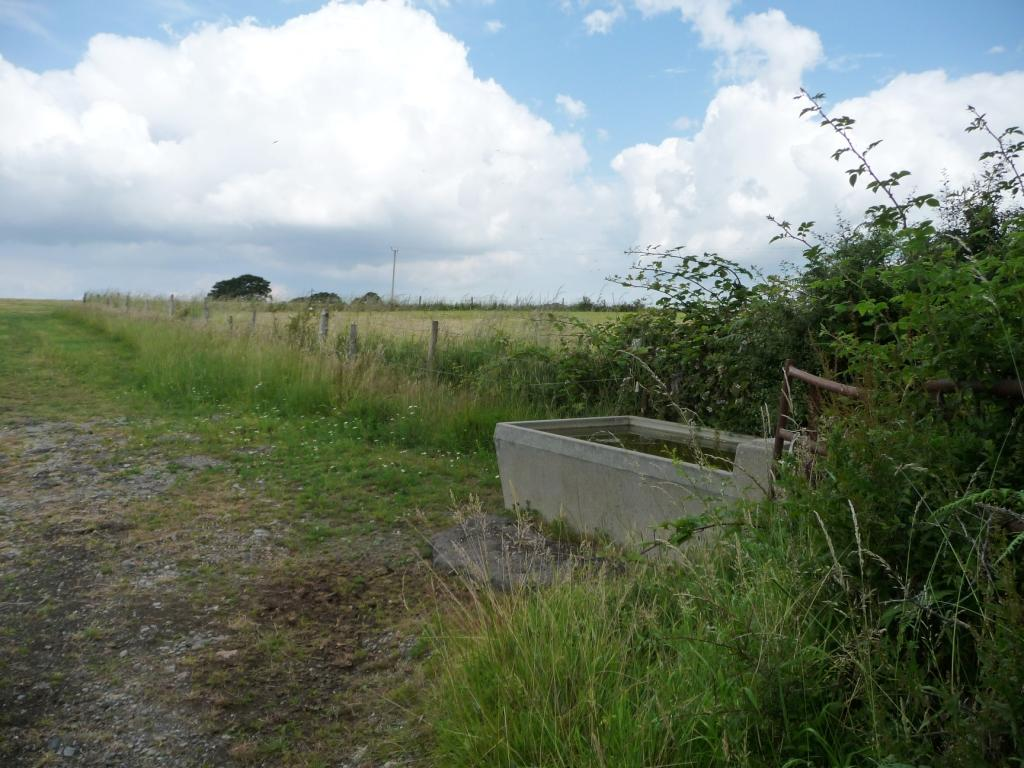

- Location within Somerset
- Location of Barrington Hill Meadows.
- Area of search: Somerset
- Grid reference: ST300170
- Coordinates: 50.94817°N 2.99783°W
- Interest: Biological
- Area: 16.1 hectares (0.161 km^{2}; 0.062 sq mi)
- Notification date: 1987

Barrington Hill Meadows (grid reference ST300170) is a 16.1 hectare (39.5 acre) biological Site of Special Scientific Interest in Somerset, England, notified in 1987.

Barrington Hill Meadows, 2 km west of the A358, midway between the villages of Windmill Hill and Bickenhall, is an English Nature national nature reserve.

This site comprises four meadows surrounded by well established hedges on gently sloping clay-rich soils. It is an outstanding example of a traditionally managed unimproved neutral grassland of a type now rare in Britain. Additional interest lies in the occurrence of an extremely rare grass species. The meadows belong to a type characterised by the widespread occurrence of Sweet Vernal Grass (Anthoxanthum odoratum), Crested Dog's-tail (Cynosurus cristatus), Cowslip (Primula veris) and Green-winged Orchid (Orchis morio). A total of 74 different species have so far been recorded. This site is one of only 3 localities in Britain in which the grass Gaudinia fragilis is a prominent feature of the sward.
