= Edmund Chisholm Batten =

Edmund Chisholm Batten (sometimes written Chisholm-Batten) FRSE (1817–1897) was a British antiquarian and author of legal treatises.

== Life ==
He was educated at Sherborne School, where he was Head Boy, and then sent north to Edinburgh to train as a barrister. Here he became a friend of Prof James David Forbes, a relationship which lasted for life. On qualifying he went to London to serve as a barrister at Lincoln's Inn. However, he is largely remembered as an author on both legal proceedings and upon historical places (especially priories).

He was elected a Fellow of the Royal Society of Edinburgh in 1858.

Through an ancestor, Robert Batten, he inherited the Thornfalcon Estate and lived there for most of his life. He also (through his wife) inherited Erchless Castle, home to the chief of the Clan Chisholm. This stands near Beauly, west of Inverness.

He died at Thornfalcon in Somerset on 13 February 1897 and is buried in the local churchyard there.

== Publications ==
- A Practical Treatise of Law Relating to the Specific Performance of Contracts
- A Treatise on the Jurisdiction, Pleadings and Practice of the County Courts in Equity
- The Charters Priory of Priory
- The Charters of the Priory of Beauly
- On the Cause of the Heat in the Bath Waters (1878)
- The Register of Richard Fox While Bishop of Bath and Wells (1894)

== Family ==
On 1 August 1843 he married Jemima Chisholm, sister of the Chisholm clan chief, Roderick Chisholm, usually referred to simply as "The Chisholm". From 1858, on the death of the clan chief, his sister inherited all titles and estates and from thence onward he was known as Edmund Chisholm Batten. From 1858 until 1896 he made annual trips to the Highlands of Scotland with his wife, in the role of visiting the Clan Chisholm.

They had seven children, including Admiral Alexander William Chisholm-Batten.
