= Thornfalcon =

Village and civil parish in Somerset, England

Coordinates: 51.0064°N 3.0204°W

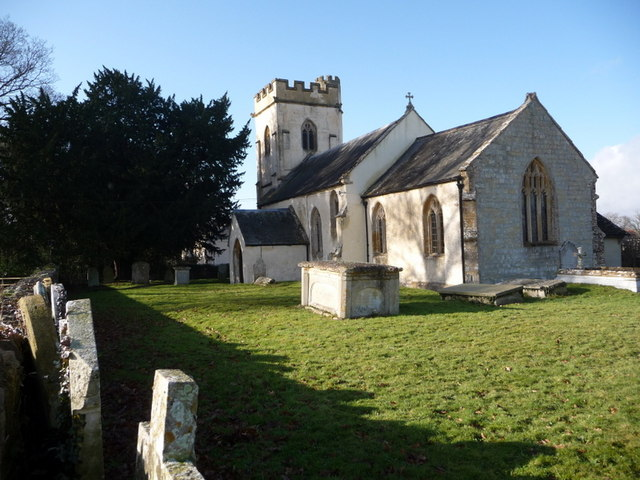
- Church of the Holy Cross, Thornfalcon

- Location within Somerset
- Population: 119 (2011)
- OS grid reference: ST285235
- Unitary authority: Somerset Council
- Ceremonial county: Somerset
- Region: South West
- Country: England
- Sovereign state: United Kingdom
- Post town: TAUNTON
- Postcode district: TA3
- Dialling code: 01823
- Police: Avon and Somerset
- Fire: Devon and Somerset
- Ambulance: South Western
- UK Parliament: Taunton and Wellington

Thornfalcon is a village and civil parish in Somerset, England, situated 4 miles (6.4 km) east of Taunton. The village has a population of 119. The parish includes the hamlet of Ash. The name comes from Thorn, and the personal name Fagun (now Falcon) which was the Norman surname of Sir Gilbert of Thorn, whose family were lords of the manor until the 14th century.

== History ==
The parish of Thorne Falcon was part of the North Curry Hundred. The manor was bought from the Burridges of Lyme Regis by Nathaniel Butler Batten of Yeovil whose descendants, known as Chisholm-Batten from 1859 lived at Court House.

The Battlements was built by the Chisholm-Batten family in the early-mid 19th century. It was originally a school building, but is now a private house, whilst the Court House is older, dating from the late 15th century.

The parish Church of the Holy Cross dates from the 14th century and was restored in 1882 by Benjamin Ferrey. It is designated as a grade I listed building.

== Governance ==
For local government purposes, since 1 April 2023, the village comes under the unitary authority of Somerset Council. Prior to this, it was part of the non-metropolitan district of Somerset West and Taunton (formed on 1 April 2019) and, before this, the district of Taunton Deane (established under the Local Government Act 1972). From 1894-1974, for local government purposes, Thornfalcon was part of Taunton Rural District.

The parish council has responsibility for local issues, including setting an annual precept (local rate) to cover the council’s operating costs and producing annual accounts for public scrutiny. The parish council evaluates local planning applications and works with the local police, district council officers, and neighbourhood watch groups on matters of crime, security, and traffic. The parish council's role includes initiating projects for maintenance and repair of parish facilities, as well as consulting with the district council on the maintenance, repair, and improvement of highways, drainage, footpaths, public transport, and street cleaning. Conservation matters (including trees and listed buildings) and environmental issues are the council's responsibility.

It is part of the Taunton and Wellington county constituency represented in the House of Commons of the Parliament of the United Kingdom. It elects one Member of Parliament (MP) by the first past the post system of election.

== Transport ==
There was a station on the Chard Branch Line that closed in 1962. The road bridge over the line is designated as a Grade II listed building. The village is near the Great Western Railway and the Chard Canal — the road bridge over the canal is also listed.
