= Church of the Holy Cross, Thornfalcon =

Church in Somerset, England

Church of the Holy Cross
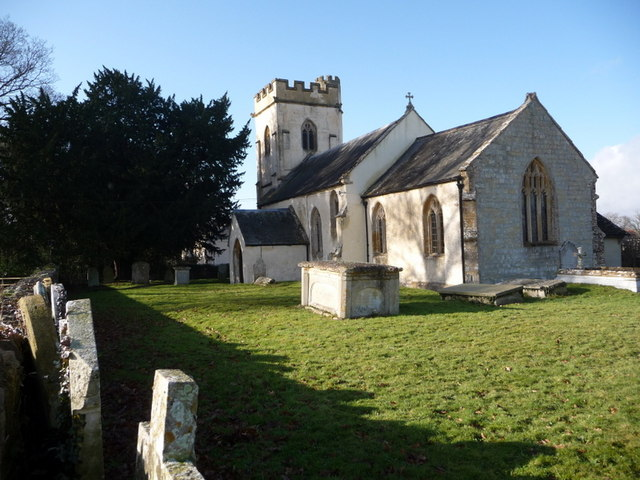

- Location within Somerset

General information
- Location: Thornfalcon, England
- Coordinates: 51.0101°N 3.0229°W
- Completed: 14th century

The Church of the Holy Cross in Thornfalcon, Somerset, England dates from the 14th century and was restored in 1882 by Benjamin Ferrey. It has been designated as a grade I listed building.

The font dates from a building which stood on the site in the later 13th century, parts of which may remain in the walls of the nave and chancel.

The tower contains five bells the oldest of which was cast in 1609.

The parish is part of the benefice of Creech St Michael and Ruishton with Thornfalcon within the Taunton deanery.

== See also ==
- Grade I listed buildings in Taunton Deane
- List of Somerset towers
- List of ecclesiastical parishes in the Diocese of Bath and Wells
