= Hundred of Abdick and Bulstone =

Historical Hundred of Somerset, England

Abdick and Bulstone
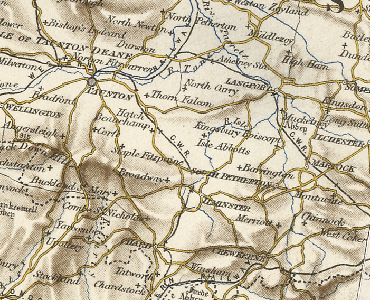
- A map showing the hundred of Abdick and Bulstone dating from the 1850s
- Area
- 38,575 acres (15,611 ha)
- Population
  - 1851: 12,047
- Status: Hundred
- Subdivisions
  - Type: Parishes
  - Units: Ashill, Beer Crocome, Bickenhall, Broadway, Buckland Street, Curland, Curry Mallet, Curry Rivel, Donyatt, Drayton, Earnshill, Fivehead, Ilminster, Puckington, South Bradon, Swell and Whitelackington

The Hundred of Abdick and Bulstone is one of the 40 historical Hundreds in the ceremonial county of Somerset, England, dating from before the Norman conquest during the Anglo-Saxon era although exact dates are unknown. Each hundred had a 'fyrd', which acted as the local defence force and a court which was responsible for the maintenance of the frankpledge system. They also formed a unit for the collection of taxes. The role of the hundred court was described in the Dooms (laws) of King Edgar. The name of the hundred was normally that of its meeting-place.

The Hundred was formed mainly from parishes previously in the ancient Domesday hundred of Abdick.

The Hundred of Abdick and Bulstone contained the parishes of Ashill, Beer Crocome, Bickenhall, Broadway, Buckland Street, Curland, Curry Mallet, Curry Rivel, Donyatt, Drayton, Earnshill, Fivehead, Ilminster, Puckington, South Bradon, Swell and Whitelackington. The Hundred contained 38,575 acres (15,611 ha), had a population of 12,047 according to the 1851 census, and housed at least 2,498 houses.

The importance of the hundred courts declined from the seventeenth century. By the 19th century several different single-purpose subdivisions of counties, such as poor law unions, sanitary districts, and highway districts sprang up, filling the administrative role previously played by parishes and hundreds. Although the Hundreds have never been formally abolished, their functions ended with the establishment of county courts in 1867 and the introduction of districts by the Local Government Act 1894.
