= 1999 West Somerset District Council election =

1999 UK local government election

Map of the results of the 1999 West Somerset District council election. Conservatives in blue, independents in grey, Labour in red, Liberal Democrats in yellow and seats with no candidates in white.

The 1999 West Somerset District Council election took place on 6 May 1999 to elect members of West Somerset District Council in Somerset, England. The whole council was up for election with boundary changes since the last election in 1995. The council stayed under no overall control.

== Election result ==
West Somerset local election result 1999
Party	Seats	Gains	Losses	Net gain/loss	Seats %	Votes %	Votes	+/−
Conservative	15				48.4	44.0	7,220	+21.3%
Independent	8				25.8	13.3	2,178	-6.6%
Labour	5				16.1	25.6	4,197	-6.9%
Liberal Democrats	1				3.2	16.3	2,675	-5.8%
Green	0				0	0.9	142	+0.9%
No candidate	2				6.5	N/A	N/A	N/A

3 independent, 2 Conservative and 1 Labour candidates were unopposed at the election. A further 2 seats had no candidates standing for them.

== Ward results ==
Alcombe East (2)
Party	Candidate	Votes	%	±%
Conservative	Jamie Anderson	203		
Conservative	Nicolas Messarra	197		
Labour	Lesley Culverhouse	159		
Labour	Thomas Welch	136		
Liberal Democrats	Hazel Bowden	38		
Liberal Democrats	Rene Kinzett	38		
Turnout		771	24.3	

Alcombe West (2)
Party	Candidate	Votes	%	±%
Labour	Ivor Gibbon	421		
Labour	Simon Stokes	411		
Conservative	Terry Venner	271		
Conservative	John Walker	247		
Turnout		1,350	39.2	

Aville Vale
Party	Candidate	Votes	%	±%
Independent	George Burnell	unopposed		

Brompton Ralph and Haddon
Party	Candidate	Votes	%	±%
Independent	Geoffrey Day	227	83.8	
Labour	David Burchell	44	16.2	
Majority		183	67.5	
Turnout		271	38.6	

Carhampton and Withycombe
Party	Candidate	Votes	%	±%
Liberal Democrats	Peter Humber	495	84.2	
Conservative	Marion Stuart	93	15.8	
Majority		402	68.4	
Turnout		588	57.3	

Crowcombe and Stogumber
Party	Candidate	Votes	%	±%
Conservative	Vivian Brewer	379	72.6	
Independent	Thomas Cave-Browne-Cave	143	27.4	
Majority		236	45.2	
Turnout		522	58.0	

Dulverton and Brushford
Party	Candidate	Votes	%	±%
Independent	Steven Pugsley	unopposed		

Dunster
Party	Candidate	Votes	%	±%
Independent	Anne Cave-Brown-Cave	164	50.6	
Conservative	Martin Bale	160	49.4	
Majority		4	1.2	
Turnout		324	46.9	

Minehead North (3)
Party	Candidate	Votes	%	±%
Conservative	Christine Lawrence	581		
Conservative	Ann Foxhuntley	526		
Conservative	Keith Parkes	521		
Labour	David Ross	400		
Labour	John McGee	370		
Labour	Elizabeth Wightman	323		
Turnout		2,721	39.4	

Minehead South (3)
Party	Candidate	Votes	%	±%
Conservative	Colin Hill	628		
Conservative	Ernest Taylor	597		
Conservative	Jean Walker	577		
Liberal Democrats	Martyn Snell	497		
Liberal Democrats	Susan Jenkins	332		
Labour	Peter Slade	326		
Liberal Democrats	Pamela Dewis	313		
Labour	Marcus Kravis	313		
Labour	John Dore	263		
Turnout		3,846	53.2	

Old Cleeve (2)
Party	Candidate	Votes	%	±%
Independent	John Nethercott	438		
Conservative	Pamela Driver	350		
Liberal Democrats	Gabriella Bevan	184		
Green	Almuth Groos	142		
Turnout		1,114	39.7	

Porlock and District (2)
Party	Candidate	Votes	%	±%
Conservative	Angela Palmer	618		
Conservative	Jennifer David	531		
Liberal Democrats	Marilynn Russell	409		
Turnout		1,558	36.6	

Quantock Vale (2)
Party	Candidate	Votes	%	±%
Conservative	Terence Ayre	unopposed		
Labour	Keith Turpin	unopposed		

Quarme
Party	Candidate	Votes	%	±%
Independent	Frederick Rawle	unopposed		

Watchet (3)
Party	Candidate	Votes	%	±%
Labour	David Banks	479		
Conservative	Jennifer Hill	460		
Independent	Sally De Renzy-Martin	395		
Liberal Democrats	Anthony Bowden	369		
Independent	John Richards	319		
Turnout		2,022	35.9	

West Quantock
Party	Candidate	Votes	%	±%
Conservative	Barbara Child	unopposed		

Williton (2)
Party	Candidate	Votes	%	±%
Independent	Hugh Davies	492		
Labour	Edwin May	352		
Conservative	Jean Tillotson	281		
Labour	Ian Aldridge	200		
Turnout		1,325	41.5	

== By-elections between 1999 and 2003 ==
=== Williton ===
Williton By-election 9 December 1999
Party	Candidate	Votes	%	±%
Conservative		219	64.6	+39.6
Labour		120	35.4	+4.1
Majority		99	29.2	
Turnout		339	17.1	−24.4
Conservative gain from Labour		Swing		

=== Aville Vale ===
Aville Vale By-election 13 July 2000
Party	Candidate	Votes	%	±%
Conservative		327	66.1	
Independent		168	33.9	
Majority		159	32.2	
Turnout		495	53.0	
Conservative gain from Labour		Swing		
