= Wellington Rural District, Somerset =

Former local government area in the UK

Coordinates: 50.958°N 3.227°W

Wellington Rural District
- Area
  - 1911: 34,626 acres (140.13 km^{2})
  - 1961: 37,911 acres (153.42 km^{2})
- Population
  - 1911: 6,074
  - 1961: 8,121
- History
  - Created: 1894
  - Abolished: 1974
- Status: Rural district

Wellington was a rural district in Somerset, England, from 1894 to 1974.

It was created in 1894 under the Local Government Act 1894.

In 1974 it was abolished under the Local Government Act 1972 when it became part of Taunton Deane.

The parishes which were included in the district included Ashbrittle, Bathealton, Bradford on Tone, Chipstable, Fitzhead, Langford Budville, Milverton, Nynehead, Oake, Sampford Arundel, Stawley, Wellington Without, West Buckland and Wiveliscombe.
