= St Lawrence's Church, Lydeard St Lawrence =

Church in Somerset, England

Church of St Lawrence
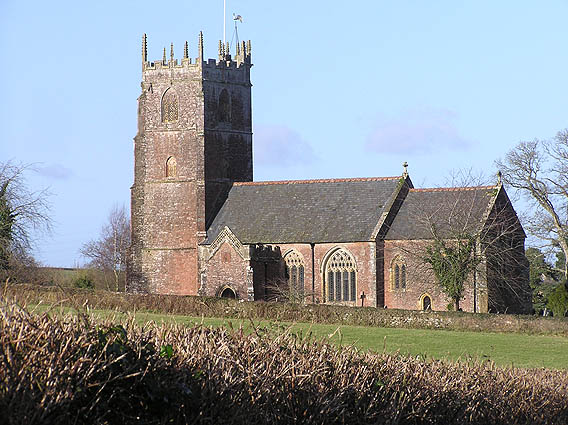

- Location within Somerset

General information
- Location: Lydeard St Lawrence, England
- Coordinates: 51.0820°N 3.2461°W
- Completed: 1350

The Anglican Church of St Lawrence in Lydeard St Lawrence, Somerset, England dates from 1350 and has been designated as a Grade I listed building.

The parish is part of the benefice of Bishops Lydeard with Lydeard St Lawrence, Bagborough, Combe Florey and Cothelstone within the archdeaconry of Taunton.

== History ==
The manor was granted to Taunton Priory by Simon de Florey in the late 12th century with the patronage later being held by the Portman family during the 17th and 18th centuries.

The chancel and nave of the church are from the original construction; however the north aisle, three-stage west tower, and north and south porches were added in the 15th century. The church underwent Victorian restoration in 1869.

== Interior ==
The church includes a 14th-century piscina and a screen from the early 16th century.

The font is inverted with the original bowl being at the bottom and a new bowl carved into the top surface which was originally the base. Local legend says this was due to anger among local residents at John Venn for signing the death warrant of Charles I. They did not wish for their children to be baptised in the same font, however it is more likely to have been following damage to the font during restoration works.

== Churchyard ==
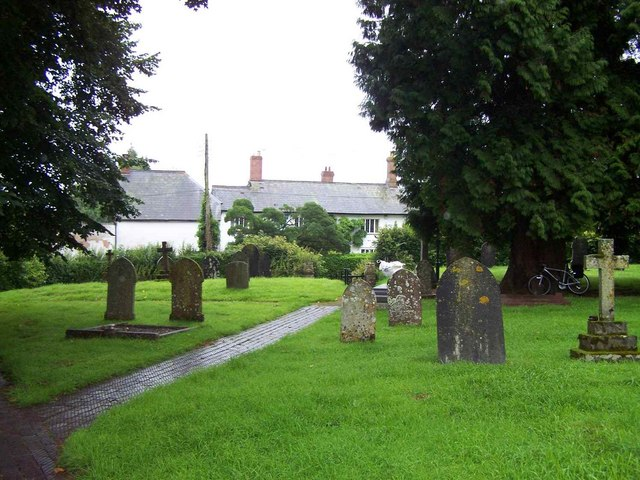
The churchyard

In the churchyard is the remains of a church cross dating from the 14th century. The shaft is octagonal and made from red sandstone. There is also a Ham stone chest tomb inscribed to John North who died in 1721 and Grace North who died in 1759. There are also several unidentified tombs from the 17th and 18th centuries.

== See also ==
- List of Grade I listed buildings in Taunton Deane
- List of towers in Somerset
- List of ecclesiastical parishes in the Diocese of Bath and Wells
