= Wellington Without =

Civil parish in Somerset, United Kingdom

Coordinates: 50.958°N 3.227°W

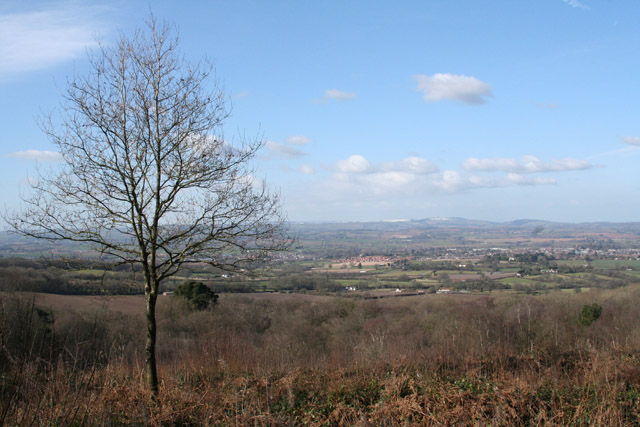
- View north to the town of Wellington from Quarts Moor, a National Trust site east of the Wellington Monument

- Location within Somerset
- Population: 745 (2021 census)
- Civil parish: Wellington Without
- Unitary authority: Somerset
- Ceremonial county: Somerset
- Region: South West
- Country: England
- Sovereign state: United Kingdom
- Police: Avon and Somerset
- Fire: Devon and Somerset
- Ambulance: South Western

Wellington Without is a civil parish in Somerset, England. The parish was created in 1933 from the more rural southern and western parts of the old parish of Wellington. At the 2021 census, the parish had a population of 745. The parish includes the hamlet of Ford Street or Fordstreet.

== Governance ==
The parish council has responsibility for local issues, including setting an annual precept (local rate) to cover the council's operating costs.

For local government purposes, since 1 April 2023, the parish comes under the unitary authority of Somerset Council. Prior to this, it was part of the non-metropolitan district of Somerset West and Taunton (formed on 1 April 2019) and, before this, the district of Taunton Deane (established under the Local Government Act 1972). From 1894-1974, for local government purposes, Wellington Without was part of Wellington Rural District.

It is also part of the Taunton and Wellington county constituency represented in the House of Commons of the Parliament of the United Kingdom. It elects one Member of Parliament (MP) by the first past the post system of election.
