= Staple Fitzpaine =

Village and civil parish in Somerset, England

Coordinates: 50.9599°N 3.0520°W

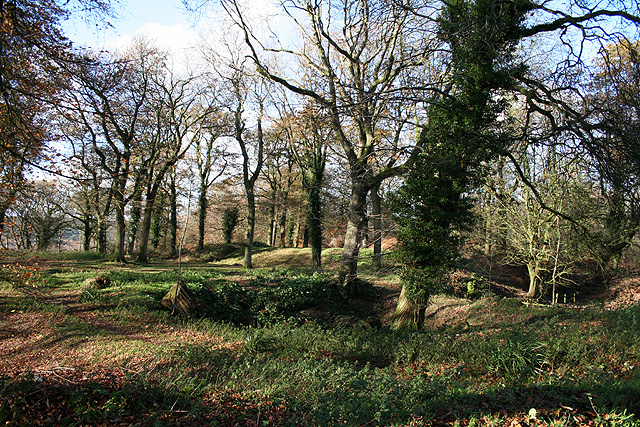
- Castle Neroche

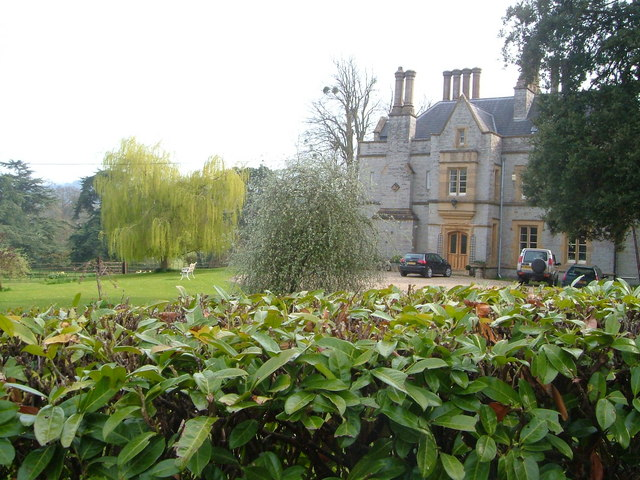
- Staple Fitzpaine manor house

- Location within Somerset
- Population: 189 (2011)
- OS grid reference: ST262183
- Unitary authority: Somerset Council
- Ceremonial county: Somerset
- Region: South West
- Country: England
- Sovereign state: United Kingdom
- Post town: TAUNTON
- Postcode district: TA3
- Dialling code: 01823
- Police: Avon and Somerset
- Fire: Devon and Somerset
- Ambulance: South Western
- UK Parliament: Taunton and Wellington

Staple Fitzpaine is a village and civil parish in Somerset, England, situated five miles (eight kilometres) south of Taunton. The village has a population of 189 and is within the Blackdown Hills Area of Outstanding Natural Beauty. The parish includes the hamlet of Badger Street.

The parish (by area the second-largest in Somerset) stretches south to Castle Neroche, east to Whitty Cross, west to Staple Hill and north to just past Smokey Bottom. The main part of the village is centred on the crossroads by the Greyhound Inn, on the Taunton-Chard road. Curland and Bickenhall, two smaller villages close by to the east, are socially and culturally one with Staple Fitzpaine. They have a combined population of almost 200.

== History ==
Around the crossroads at Staple Fitzpaine there are several large sandstone boulders. They are called devilstones and are said to have been thrown by the Devil from Castle Neroche (some went over Staple to land in the Witch Lodge area, another he tossed back over his shoulder into West Buckland). According to legend if you prick them with a pin they draw blood. The Old English word "Stapol" means pillar or post and it is thought likely that this gave the village the first part of its name. The second part of the name comes from the Fitzpaine family who owned the manor between 1233 and 1393.

== Governance ==
The parish council has responsibility for local issues, including setting an annual precept (local rate) to cover the council's operating costs and producing annual accounts for public scrutiny. The parish council evaluates local planning applications and works with the local police, district council officers, and neighbourhood watch groups on matters of crime, security, and traffic.

For local government purposes, since 1 April 2023, the village comes under the unitary authority of Somerset Council. Prior to this, it was part of the non-metropolitan district of Somerset West and Taunton (formed on 1 April 2019) and, before this, the district of Taunton Deane (established under the Local Government Act 1972). From 1894-1974, for local government purposes, Staple Fitzpaine was part of Taunton Rural District.

It is also part of the Taunton and Wellington county constituency represented in the House of Commons of the Parliament of the United Kingdom. It elects one Member of Parliament (MP) by the first past the post system of election.

== Landmarks ==
The William Portman Almshouses in the village date from 1643, and were restored in 1970. They were originally donated by Sir William Portman. The Portman family from nearby Orchard Portman purchased the village in 1600 and dominated it until 1944.

The Manor was built in 1840 as the rectory for the Rev. Fitzhardinge Berkeley Portman.

== St. Peter's Church ==
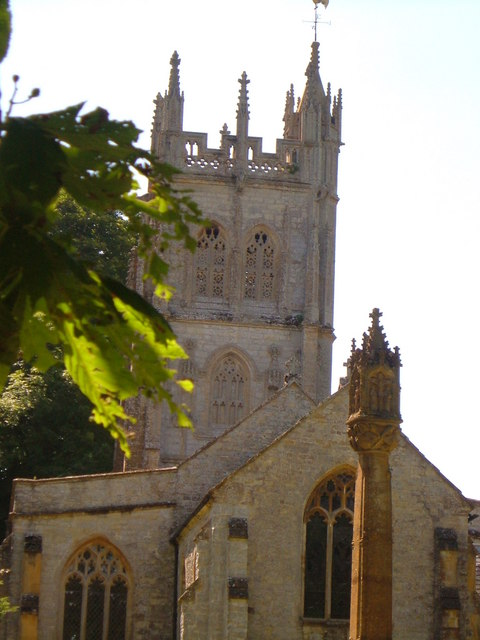
Church of St Peter

The Church of St Peter is Norman in origin, and has a Norman doorway reset in the south aisle. The chancel dates from the 14th century. The north aisle was added and the church refenestrated in the 15th century. The tower dates from about 1500, however the south porch and vestry are much more recent, dating from 1841. The crenellated three-stage tower has merlons pierced with trefoil headed arches set on a quatrefoil pierced parapet. The church has been designated by English Heritage as a Grade I listed building.

The church has six bells, the heaviest at 16/17cwt. The no.2 is the oldest, from 1480, and the newest addition is the treble bell which was brought in during the mid 1980s from Chaffcombe church. In 1803 one of the bells was made by Thomas Castleman Bilbie of Cullompton, one of the Bilbie family of bell founders and clock makers.

The churchyard is also home to a sandstone cross. It was built in the 14th century and then largely rebuilt around 1894.
