= Church of St Mary, Donyatt =

Church in Somerset, England

Church of St Mary
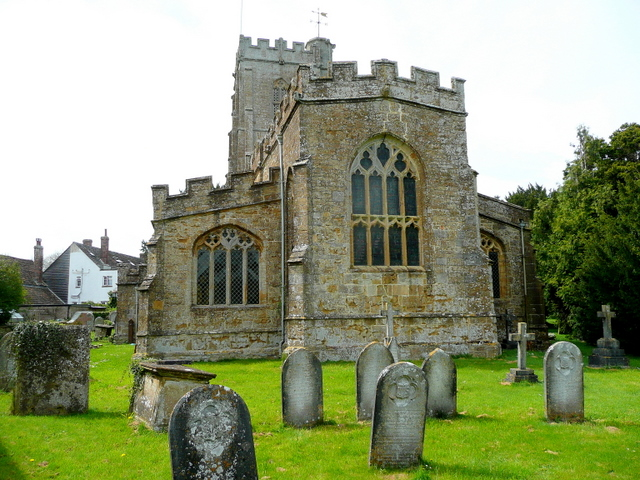

- Location within Somerset
- 50.9222°N 2.9416°W
- Location: Donyatt, Somerset, England

History
- Built: 15th century

Listed Building – Grade II*
- Official name: Church of St Mary
- Designated: 4 February 1958
- Reference no.: 1057074

The Anglican Church of st Mary in Donyatt, Somerset, England was built in the 15th century. It is a Grade II* listed building.

== History ==
The church was built in the 15th century on the site of an earlier church. Some of the stone from the previous church was used in the construction of local houses and one stone is believed to have a Sheela na gig.

The north aisle was added later in the 15th century. 19th century Victorian restoration included a new ceiling.

The parish is part of the Isle Valley benefice within the Diocese of Bath and Wells.

== Architecture ==
The stone church has hamstone dressings and a sheet lead roof. It consists of a four-bay nave and two-bay chancel, with north and south aisles each of five-bays. The three-stage tower is supported by corner buttresses. The roof of the tower is behind a parapet and has a stair turret.

In 2002 a fifth bell was added to the peal in the tower, using a redundant bell from St Peter ad Vincula, Coggeshall.

== See also ==
- List of ecclesiastical parishes in the Diocese of Bath and Wells
