= Comeytrowe =

Suburb of Taunton, Somerset, England

Coordinates: 51.0053°N 3.1344°W

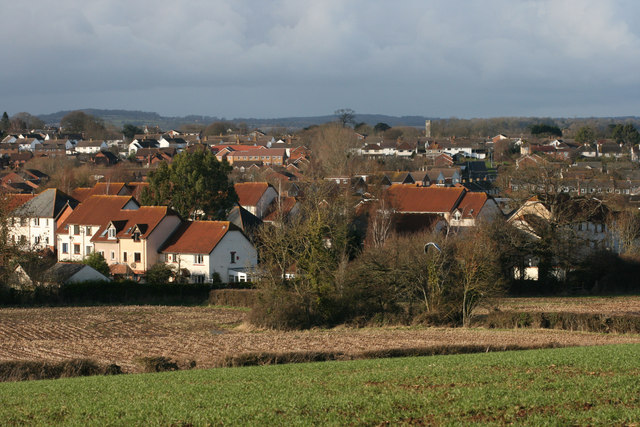
- Comeytrowe

- Location within Somerset
- Population: 5,463 (2011)
- OS grid reference: ST205235
- Civil parish: Taunton
- Unitary authority: Somerset Council
- Ceremonial county: Somerset
- Region: South West
- Country: England
- Sovereign state: United Kingdom
- Post town: TAUNTON
- Postcode district: TA1
- Dialling code: 01823
- Police: Avon and Somerset
- Fire: Devon and Somerset
- Ambulance: South Western
- UK Parliament: Taunton and Wellington

Comeytrowe is a south western suburb of Taunton and former civil parish, now in the parish Taunton in the county Somerset, England. In 2011 the parish had a population of 5,463. The parish included the area Galmington.

== History ==
The suburb Comeytrowe was built in the second half of the 20th century to house the growing population of Taunton.

The parish was formed in 1986 occupying land which was previously part of the parish of Trull.

In the 1980s new shops and a doctors' surgery were opened. A new parish church dedicated to St Michael was also constructed.

== Governance ==
The parish council has responsibility for local issues, including setting an annual precept (local rate) to cover the council's operating costs and producing annual accounts for public scrutiny. The parish council evaluates local planning applications and works with the local police, district council officers, and neighbourhood watch groups on matters of crime, security, and traffic. The parish council's role also includes initiating projects for the maintenance and repair of parish facilities, as well as consulting with the district council on the maintenance, repair, and improvement of highways, drainage, footpaths, public transport, and street cleaning. Conservation matters (including trees and listed buildings) and environmental issues are also the responsibility of the council.

For local government purposes, since 1 April 2023, the village comes under the unitary authority of Somerset Council. Prior to this, it was part of the non-metropolitan district of Somerset West and Taunton (formed on 1 April 2019) and, before this, the district of Taunton Deane (established under the Local Government Act 1972). Prior to that, Comeytrowe was part of Taunton Municipal Borough and Taunton Rural District before that.

It is also part of the Taunton and Wellington county constituency represented in the House of Commons of the Parliament of the United Kingdom. It elects one Member of Parliament (MP) by the first past the post system of election. It was part of the South West England constituency of the European Parliament prior to Britain leaving the European Union in January 2020, which elected seven MEPs using the d'Hondt method of party-list proportional representation.

Comeytrowe became a civil parish on 1 April 1986, being formed from part of Trull. On 1 April 2023 the parish was abolished to form Taunton.

== Geography ==
The South Taunton Streams Local Nature Reserve was created in 2004. It includes four sites - Mill Stream, Killams, Glasses Mead, and Blackbrook Open Space - which provide a wetland environment in the suburbs of south Taunton before reaching the River Tone.

The flora and fauna include Water voles, Otters, Kingfishers, Sand martins and Dippers. They are also foraging areas for bats, especially Pipistrelle, Lesser horseshoe and Noctule.

=== Climate ===
Along with the rest of South West England, Comeytrowe has a temperate climate which is generally wetter and milder than the rest of the country. The annual mean temperature is approximately 10 °C (50.0 °F). Seasonal temperature variation is less extreme than most of the United Kingdom because of the adjacent sea temperatures. The summer months of July and August are the warmest with mean daily maxima of approximately 21 °C (69.8 °F). In winter mean minimum temperatures of 1 °C (33.8 °F) or 2 °C (35.6 °F) are common. In the summer the Azores high pressure affects the south-west of England, however convective cloud sometimes forms inland, reducing the number of hours of sunshine. Annual sunshine rates are slightly less than the regional average of 1,600 hours. In December 1998 there were 20 days without sun recorded at Yeovilton. Most of the rainfall in the south-west is caused by Atlantic depressions or by convection. Most of the rainfall in autumn and winter is caused by the Atlantic depressions, which is when they are most active. In summer, a large proportion of the rainfall is caused by sun heating the ground leading to convection and to showers and thunderstorms. Average rainfall is around 700 mm (28 in). About 8–15 days of snowfall is typical. November to March have the highest mean wind speeds, and June to August have the lightest winds. The predominant wind direction is from the south-west.

== Education ==
The Bishop Henderson primary school, named after the then Bishop of Bath and Wells, was built in the 1980s and provides places for 400 pupils aged 4 to 11. Secondary education is provided at The Castle School, which shares its campus with the Somerset College of Arts and Technology. Private education is available at Queen's College.

== Sports ==
Galmington is home to a youth football club called Galmington Dragons who play at Musgrove Park in the Taunton Youth League. The teams start playing at the park from eleven and up.
