= Lydeard St Lawrence =

Village and civil parish in Somerset, England

Coordinates: 51.0851°N 3.2506°W

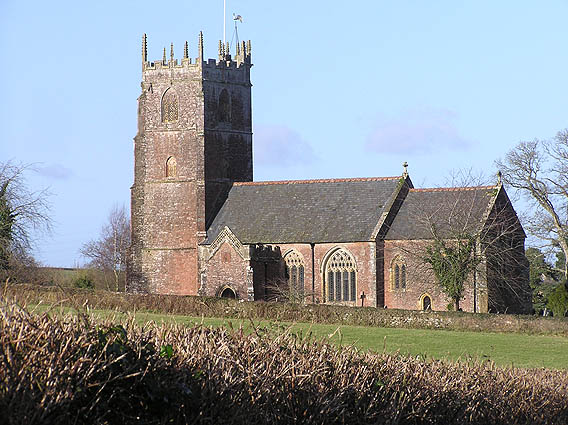
- Church of St Lawrence, Lydeard St Lawrence

- Location within Somerset
- Population: 506
- OS grid reference: ST125325
- Unitary authority: Somerset Council
- Ceremonial county: Somerset
- Region: South West
- Country: England
- Sovereign state: United Kingdom
- Post town: TAUNTON
- Postcode district: TA4
- Dialling code: 01823
- Police: Avon and Somerset
- Fire: Devon and Somerset
- Ambulance: South Western
- UK Parliament: Tiverton and Minehead

Lydeard St Lawrence or St Lawrence Lydiard is a village and civil parish in Somerset, England, situated 7 miles (11.3 km) north west of Taunton. The village has a population of 506. The parish includes the hamlets of Westowe, Hoccombe and Pyleigh, with its 16th century manor house.

== History ==
The Lydeard part of the name is believed to be a corruption of Lidegaard from the Celtic garth meaning ridge and Old English led meaning grey. The second part of the village name is taken from the dedication of the church.

From Saxon times the manor was owned by the Bishop of Winchester as part of their Taunton Deane estate. After the Norman Conquest it was granted to Wilward by William the Conqueror and known as Pylegh. The parish of Lydeard St Lawrence was part of the Taunton Deane Hundred.

In the 18th century the manor was acquired by the Hancock family.

== Governance ==
The parish council has responsibility for local issues, including setting an annual precept (local rate) to cover the council’s operating costs and producing annual accounts for public scrutiny. The parish council evaluates local planning applications and works with the local police, district council officers, and neighbourhood watch groups on matters of crime, security, and traffic. The parish council's role also includes initiating projects for the maintenance and repair of parish facilities, as well as consulting with the district council on the maintenance, repair, and improvement of highways, drainage, footpaths, public transport, and street cleaning. Conservation matters (including trees and listed buildings) and environmental issues are also the responsibility of the council.

For local government purposes, since 1 April 2023, the village comes under the unitary authority of Somerset Council. Prior to this, it was part of the non-metropolitan district of Somerset West and Taunton (formed on 1 April 2019) and, before this, the district of Taunton Deane (established under the Local Government Act 1972). From 1894-1974, for local government purposes, Lydeard St Lawrence was part of Taunton Rural District.

It is also part of the Tiverton and Minehead county constituency represented in the House of Commons of the Parliament of the United Kingdom. It elects one Member of Parliament (MP) by the first past the post system of election.

== Religious sites ==
The parish Church of St Lawrence dates from 1350 and has been designated as a Grade I listed building. It was granted to Taunton Priory by Simon de Florey in the late 12th century with the patronage later being held by the Portman family during the 17th and 18th centuries.

== Notable residents ==
- Thomas Manton (1620–1677) an English Puritan clergyman was born in the village.
- John Venn (1586 – 28 June 1650) Politician and soldier. Signed the death warrant of Charles I.
- Henry Wolcott (6 December 1578 – 30 May 1655) Emigrant to Windsor, Hartford, Connecticut, sailing on "The Mary and John" to Boston in 1630. Grandfather of Gov. Roger Wolcott, and great-grandfather of Gov. Oliver Wolcott.

== Less notable residents ==
Thomas Benet, clerk, suffered the cutting down & removal of trees from his land in Lydeyerde St Laurence, in 1396.
