= Taunton Deane =

Former non-metropolitan district in England

- Non-metropolitan district

- Shown within Somerset
- Sovereign state: United Kingdom
- Constituent country: England
- Region: South West England
- Ceremonial county: Somerset
- Admin HQ: Taunton
- Created: 1 April 1974
- Abolished: 31 March 2019

Government
  - Type: Non-metropolitan district

Area
  - Total: 178.87 sq mi (463.26 km^{2})

Population (2017)
  - Total: 117,400
  - Density: 656.4/sq mi (253.4/km^{2})
- Time zone: UTC0 (GMT)
  - Summer (DST): UTC+1 (BST)
- Post Code: TA1-4
- Area code: 01823
- Website: http://www.tauntondeane.gov.uk/

Taunton Deane was a local government district with borough status in Somerset, England. Its council was based in Taunton.

The district was formed on 1 April 1974, under the Local Government Act 1972, by a merger of the Municipal Borough of Taunton, Wellington Urban District, Taunton Rural District, and Wellington Rural District.

Taunton Deane was granted borough status in 1975, perpetuating the mayoralty of Taunton.

The district was given the name of an alternative form of the Taunton Deane Hundred.

In September 2016, West Somerset and Taunton Deane councils agreed in principle to merge the districts into one (with one council) subject to consultation. The new district would not be a unitary authority, with Somerset County Council still performing its functions. In March 2018 both councils voted in favour of the merger and it came into effect on 1 April 2019, with the first elections to the new council in May 2019. The new district was known as Somerset West and Taunton.

== Governance ==
The district was governed by Taunton Deane Borough Council, and had periods of both Conservative and Liberal Democrat control, as well as times under no overall control. At the final election in 2015, the Conservatives gained an increased majority on the council.

Party	Seats Held	Net Gain/Loss	Votes Received
Conservative	36	+8	49,934
Liberal Democrat	14	-9	39,608
Independent	3	+1	5,310
Labour	2	-1	9,268
UKIP	1	+1	1,349

== Settlements ==
Settlements in bold have a town charter or a population over 2,500.

- Ash Priors - Ashbrittle
- Bathealton - Bickenhall - **Bishop's Hull** - Bishops Lydeard - Bradford-on-Tone - Burrowbridge
- Cheddon Fitzpaine - Chipstable - Churchstanton - Combe Florey - **Comeytrowe** - Corfe - Cotford St Luke - Cothelstone - Creech St Michael - Curland
- Durston
- Fitzhead
- Halse - Hatch Beauchamp
- Kingston St Mary
- Langford Budville - Lydeard St Lawrence
- Milverton
- North Curry - **Norton Fitzwarren** - Nynehead
- Oake - Orchard Portman - Otterford
- Pitminster
- Ruishton
- Sampford Arundel - Staple Fitzpaine - Staplegrove - Stawley - Stoke St Gregory - Stoke St Mary
- **Taunton** - Thornfalcon - Tolland - Trull
- **Wellington** - West Bagborough - West Buckland - West Monkton - **Wiveliscombe**

== Parishes ==
Part of the former Taunton Municipal Borough is unparished.

Image	Name	Status	Population	Former local authority	Coordinates	Refs
Old yew tree	Ashbrittle	Civil parish	225	Wellington Rural District	50.98°N 3.35°W	
Red stone building with square tower.	Ash Priors	Civil parish	155	Taunton Rural District	51.06°N 3.21°W	
Road junction with house on the right of the road. On the left is a churchyard behind a wall accessed via steps.	Bathealton	Civil parish	194	Wellington Rural District	51.01°N 3.31°W	
A few buildings scattered amongst fields and trees.	Bickenhall	Civil parish	122	Taunton Rural District	50.96°N 3.03°W	
Yellow stone house with tall chimneys behind brick wall.	Bishop's Hull	Civil parish	2,975	Taunton Rural District	51.02°N 3.14°W	
Red stone building with square tower. In the foreground is a graveyard.	Bishops Lydeard	Civil parish	2,839 (includes Cotford St Luke)	Taunton Rural District	51.06°N 3.19°W	
Stone building with square tower.	Bradford-on-Tone	Civil parish	622	Wellington Rural District	51.00°N 3.18°W	
Arched bridge with metal railing. Sign showing River Parrett, Burrow Bridge.	Burrowbridge	Civil parish	508	Taunton Rural District	51.07°N 2.92°W	
Large tree on the left of a field in the foreground with buildings in the distance.	Cheddon Fitzpaine	Civil parish	1,929	Taunton Rural District	51.04°N 3.08°W	
Houses and fields be3side a country lane.	Chipstable	Civil parish	309	Wellington Rural District	51.04°N 3.37°W	
Stone building with square tower, partially obscured by trees.	Churchstanton	Civil parish	752	Taunton Rural District	50.92°N 3.15°W	
Street scene with houses and trees separated from the road by a stone wall.	Combe Florey	Civil parish	261	Taunton Rural District	51.08°N 3.21°W	
Multiple reddish brown roofs of houses. A church tower is visible in the distance.	Comeytrowe	Civil parish	5,463	Taunton Municipal Borough; Taunton Rural District	51.01°N 3.13°W	
Celtic pattern stone cross in the foreground with trees and houses in the background.	Corfe	Civil parish	253	Taunton Rural District	50.97°N 3.09°W	
Modern suburban housing estate with cars parked.	Cotford St Luke	Civil parish	created post-census	Taunton Rural District	51.0392°N 3.1886°W	
Large house seen through trees.	Cothelstone	Civil parish	111	Taunton Rural District	51.08°N 3.16°W	
Bridge over still water with a house to the right.	Creech St Michael	Civil parish	2,416	Taunton Rural District	51.02°N 3.04°W	
White painted building with arched windows. In the foreground are gravestones.	Curland	Civil parish	225	Taunton Rural District	50.95°N 3.03°W	
Stone building with square tower and arched windows.	Durston	Civil parish	136	Taunton Rural District	51.05°N 3.01°W	
Reddish building with square tower.	Fitzhead	Civil parish	264	Wellington Rural District	51.05°N 3.26°W	
Reddish stone building with square tower.	Halse	Civil parish	290	Taunton Rural District	51.04°N 3.23°W	
Gray stone building with square tower and slate roof.	Hatch Beauchamp	Civil parish	620	Taunton Rural District	50.98°N 2.99°W	
Gray stone building with ornate square tower and slate roof. In the foreground are gravestones.	Kingston St Mary	Civil parish	921	Taunton Rural District	51.06°N 3.11°W	
Church tower seen across fields	Langford Budville	Civil parish	535	Wellington Rural District	51.00°N 3.27°W	
Reddish building with square tower.	Lydeard St Lawrence	Civil parish	506	Taunton Rural District	51.09°N 3.25°W	
|	Milverton	Civil parish	1,438	Wellington Rural District	51.02°N 3.25°W	
Ornate church building with hexagonal tower.	North Curry	Civil parish	1,640	Taunton Rural District	51.02°N 2.96°W	
Stone building with square tower.	Norton Fitzwarren	Civil parish	3,046	Taunton Rural District	51.02°N 3.15°W	
Reddish building with square tower.	Nynehead	Civil parish	415	Wellington Rural District	50.99°N 3.23°W	
Red stone church with square tower.	Oake	Civil parish	765	Wellington Rural District	51.02°N 3.21°W	
Red stone building with grey square tower.	Orchard Portman	Civil parish	150	Taunton Rural District	50.99°N 3.08°W	
Stone building with square tower.	Otterford	Civil parish	356	Taunton Rural District	50.92°N 3.10°W	
	Pitminster	Civil parish	956	Taunton Rural District	50.97°N 3.11°W	
Stone building with square tower showing across fields.	Ruishton	Civil parish	1,473	Taunton Rural District	51.02°N 3.05°W	
Several houses and school behind fields and hedgerows.	Sampford Arundel	Civil parish	268	Wellington Rural District	50.96°N 3.28°W	
Stone manor house with tall chimneys. In front of the house are gardens and trees.	Staple Fitzpaine	Civil parish	189	Taunton Rural District	50.96°N 3.05°W	
Stone building with square tower. In the foreground are gravestones and trees.	Staplegrove	Civil parish	1,649	Taunton Rural District	51.03°N 3.12°W	
A village of houses nestled in rolling green hills.	Stawley	Civil parish	279	Wellington Rural District	51.00°N 3.33°W	
Stone building with octagonal tower topped by a short spirelet.	Stoke St Gregory	Civil parish	942	Taunton Rural District	51.04°N 2.94°W	
Stone building with square tower.	Stoke St Mary	Civil parish	421	Taunton Rural District	50.99°N 3.05°W	
White building with square tower.	Thornfalcon	Civil parish	119	Taunton Rural District	51.01°N 3.02°W	
Stone building with square tower.	Tolland	Civil parish	81	Taunton Rural District	51.08°N 3.28°W	
Stone building with square tower.	Trull	Civil parish	2,288	Taunton Rural District	51.00°N 3.12°W	
Roofs of several houses with the square tower of the church prominent amongst them. In the background are fields and hills.	Wellington	Town	13,822	Wellington Urban District	50.98°N 3.22°W	
–	Wellington Without	Civil parish	727	Wellington Rural District	50.96°N 3.23°W	
White painted building to the right of the road, with a sign saying The Rising Sun.	West Bagborough	Civil parish	358	Taunton Rural District	51.09°N 3.18°W	
Stone building with square tower and stair turret.	West Buckland	Civil parish	1,189	Wellington Rural District	50.98°N 3.18°W	
Stone church with square tower	West Hatch	Civil parish	306	Taunton Rural District	50.98°N 3.02°W	
Stone building with square tower, partially obscured by trees.	West Monkton	Civil parish	2,787	Taunton Rural District	51.05°N 3.05°W	
Street scene with buildings and shops. The three-storey building on the left has a sign saying The Courthouse.	Wiveliscombe	Town	2,893	Wellington Rural District	51.04°N 3.31°W	

== Demography ==
Population Profile
UK Census 2001	Taunton Deane	South West England	England
Total population	102,299	4,928,434	49,138,831
Foreign born	4.1%	9.4%	9.2%
White	98.4%	97.7%	91%
Asian	0.4%	0.7%	4.6%
Black	0.2%	0.4%	2.3%
Christian	75.9%	74.0%	72%
Muslim	0.3%	0.5%	3.1%
Hindu	0.1%	0.2%	1.1%
No religion	15.7%	16.8%	15%
Over 75 years old	9.5%	9.3%	7.5%
Unemployed	2.4%	2.6%	3.3%

The town of Taunton (which for population estimates includes the unparished area - or former municipal borough - plus the neighbouring parishes of Bishop's Hull, Comeytrowe, Norton Fitzwarren, Staplegrove, Trull and West Monkton) had an estimated population of 61,400 in 2001.

Taunton formed part of the larger borough of Taunton Deane which also includes the town of Wellington and surrounding villages. Taunton Deane had an estimated population of 102,600 in 2001.

The figures below are for the Taunton Deane area.

Population since 1801 - Source: A Vision of Britain through Time
Year	1801	1851	1901	1911	1921	1931	1941	1951	1961	1971	1981	1991	2001	2011
Population Taunton Deane	33,139	51,844	53,759	55,666	56,161	56,661	62,745	69,492	75,320	81,639	84,795	95,791	102,304	110,546

== Education ==
County schools (those which are not independent) in the five non-metropolitan districts of the county were operated by Somerset County Council, or are independent of the council and run as academies.

For a full list of schools see: List of schools in Somerset

== See also ==
- List of Grade I listed buildings in Taunton Deane
- List of Scheduled Monuments in Taunton Deane
