= Durston =

Village in Somerset, England

Coordinates: 51.0515°N 3.0071°W

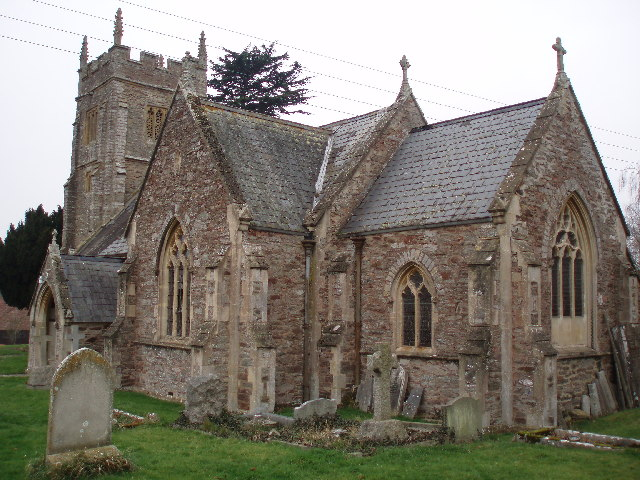
- Church of St John, Durston

- Location within Somerset
- Population: 136 (2011)
- OS grid reference: ST295285
- Unitary authority: Somerset Council
- Ceremonial county: Somerset
- Region: South West
- Country: England
- Sovereign state: United Kingdom
- Post town: TAUNTON
- Postcode district: TA3
- Dialling code: 01823
- Police: Avon and Somerset
- Fire: Devon and Somerset
- Ambulance: South Western
- UK Parliament: Taunton and Wellington

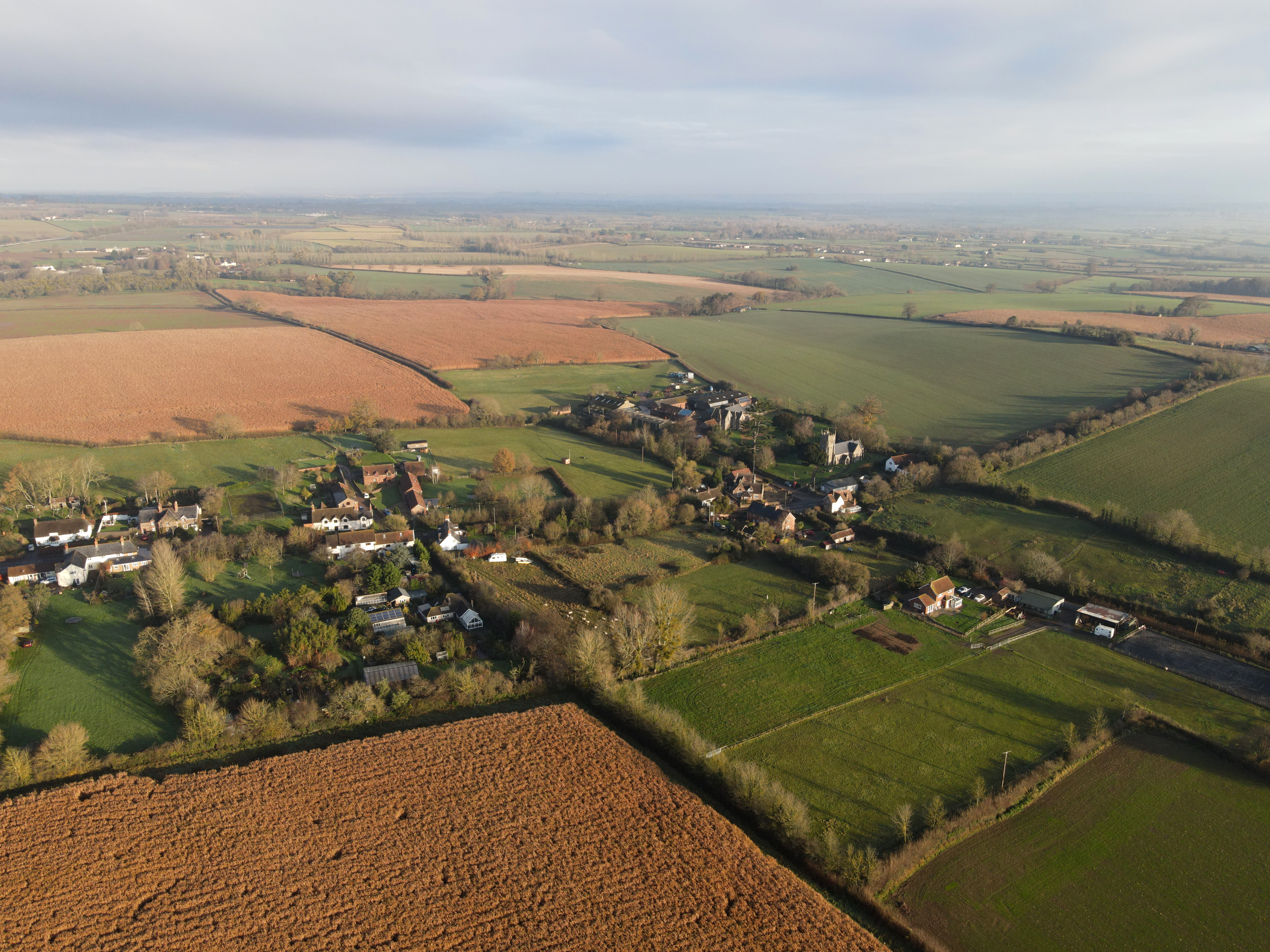
Aerial view of Durston

Durston is a village and civil parish in Somerset, England, situated on the A361 road 5 miles (8.0 km) north east of Taunton and 6 miles (9.7 km) south of Bridgwater. The parish lies on undulating ground between the lowest slopes of the Quantock Hills and the valley of the River Tone at the Curry and Hay Moors. The parish has a population of 136.

== History ==
The place-name derives from the Anglo-Saxon word 'deór-tún', being a combination of the word for a wild animal, a deer (deór,) and the word for a fenced enclosure (tún). The most likely interpretation is 'deer park'.

Alwig (a Saxon; also written Alwi) held DURSTON manor from King Edward the Confessor before the Norman Conquest. Durston appeared in the Domesday Book in 1086 as follows: Richard holds of Roger Arundel, DURSTON. Alwig held it TRE and it paid geld for 2 hides and 3 virgates of land. There is land for 4 ploughs. In demesne is 1 plough and 4 slaves; and 4 villans and 5 bordars and 4 cottars with 3 ploughs. There are 15 acres of meadow, and 20 acres of pasture and 20 acres of woodland. It was and is worth 40s.

John of Erleigh, a Norman knight, later (after 1133) received the Hundred of North Petherton (including Durston) from William the Conqueror's son Henry I. John died in 1165. John was succeeded by his son William de Erlegh who founded Buckland Priory at Durston a priory of regular canons of St. Augustine, about 1167. Soon after their institution, these canons behaved in a very riotous and disorderly manner, especially in killing their steward. Therefore, in 1180, the King removed them to other monasteries, at Taunton and elsewhere, and gave their priory to the sister Hospitallers of the order of St. John of Jerusalem. A Preceptory of the Knights Hospitaller of St. John was built nearby. The site was and is still known as Buckland.

Several historical documents give tantalizing glimpses of the lives of these Sisters, who originally cared for sick pilgrims and crusaders in Jerusalem. For whatever reason, the royal grant stipulated that this be the only Hospitallers' house in England that could receive Sisters of that order. It was later written that in all respects the sisters were looked on only as servants, and as not capable of receiving or holding anything other than from the supreme powers of the order. In 1229 they were granted the right to a cart-load of dead wood and three cart-loads of faggots per week from the park of Newton. In 1234 the king ordered that each Sister be given a tunic and a pair of slippers every year. In 1398 the Grand Master of the Order of Knights Hospitallers urged that a preceptor be named whose age and character should prevent any scandal arising from his association with the nuns. Disputes with the Knights Hospitallers at Buckland, whose Preceptor had authority over the Sisters, occurred from time to time. Around 1267 the prior of the Hospitallers in England, attending a conflict between the priory and the precept, ordered that the Sisters have their own Steward. Again, in 1338, the Preceptor of the Knights complained that the Sisters were more of a burden than a help. In 1500, however, this Preceptory was closed, while the Sisters´ Priory remained. Finally, in 1539, after the creation of the Church of England, the Sisters surrendered their house to King Henry VIII. as occurred with many monasteries and convents in that time. Around 1565 two of the former Sisters were married, one to Thomas Speed and the other to the Vicar of Lyng.

Around 1200 William's daughter Mabel married Philip Arbalistarius, who was given the manor of Mansel (Maunsel House, a mile and a half NE of Durston). Philip had to give William two young pigs every Whitsun, ″at his court of Durston″.

A deer park existed in 1223, a little north of the Durston manor house. These deer were brought from Blackmore forest, in Dorset. In the 14th century, buildings at North Petherton were constructed of wood from some of the park´s trees. In 1434 the park included 200 acres of wood and 60 acres of meadow. A later John of Erleigh, born in 1322, left the manor of Durston and woods to his daughter Margaret, who married Sir Walter Sandy. The property passed through several other families, including such surnames as St. Maur (or Seymour), Stawell and Portman.

In 1391 there were several craftsmen at Durston, such as a tanner, a smith, a skinner, and a barber, outside the gates of the priory. A spring north of Durston fed fishponds established in the later 12th century and supplied the priory with water. The water supply was channeled from a conduit by the 1260s. These fishponds were filled in by 1725.

Cogload Farm is on the site of a hamlet established by the later 13th century. Lodge Farmhouse dates from the 15th century and may once have been an ecclesiastical residence. It has been designated as a grade II* listed building. The Buckland inn was in use in the 17th and 18th centuries. In 1752 the Taunton-Glastonbury road became a turnpike. The Durston inn was opened by 1841.

== Governance ==
The parish council has responsibility for local issues, including setting an annual precept (local rate) to cover the council's operating costs and producing annual accounts for public scrutiny. The parish council evaluates local planning applications and works with the local police, district council officers, and neighbourhood watch groups on matters of crime, security, and traffic. The parish council's role also includes initiating projects for the maintenance and repair of parish facilities, as well as consulting with the district council on the maintenance, repair, and improvement of highways, drainage, footpaths, public transport, and street cleaning. Conservation matters (including trees and listed buildings) and environmental issues are also the responsibility of the council.

For local government purposes, since 1 April 2023, the village comes under the unitary authority of Somerset Council. Prior to this, it was part of the non-metropolitan district of Somerset West and Taunton (formed on 1 April 2019) and, before this, the district of Taunton Deane (established under the Local Government Act 1972). From 1894-1974, for local government purposes, Durston was part of Taunton Rural District.

It is also part of the Taunton and Wellington county constituency represented in the House of Commons of the Parliament of the United Kingdom. It elects one Member of Parliament (MP) by the first past the post system of election, and was part of the South West England constituency of the European Parliament prior to Britain leaving the European Union in January 2020, which elected seven MEPs using the d'Hondt method of party-list proportional representation.

== Transport ==
The Bridgwater and Taunton Canal also ran through the village, when it opened in 1827. It is crossed by two bridges, Headworthy and Swan's Neck.

The Bristol and Exeter Railway opened the Yeovil Branch Line on 1 October 1853 from a new junction station at Durston. The branch closed on 6 July 1964, with Durston station remaining open only until 5 October 1964. It is located close to Cogload Junction, a vital railway flyover.

== Religious sites ==
The parish Church of St John was rebuilt in 1853 on the site of an earlier church.

== See also ==
- Durston (surname)
