= 2015 West Somerset District Council election =

2015 UK local government election

Map of the results of the 2015 West Somerset District Council election. Conservatives in blue, independents in grey, UK Independence Party in purple and Labour in red.

The 2015 West Somerset District Council election took place on 7 May 2015 to elect members of West Somerset District Council in Somerset, England. The whole council was up for election and the Conservative Party remained in overall control of the council.

== Election result ==
West Somerset local election result 2015
Party	Seats	Gains	Losses	Net gain/loss	Seats %	Votes %	Votes	+/−
Conservative	21	2	0	+2	75.0	52.1	14,378	+4.7%
Independent	3	1	5	-4	10.7	15.2	4,198	-17.2%
UKIP	3	3	0	+3	10.7	5.1	1,420	+5.1%
Labour	1	0	1	-1	3.6	8.1	2,232	+1.1%
Green	0	0	0	0	0	16.5	4,566	+5.4%
Liberal Democrats	0	0	0	0	0	3.0	818	+0.8%

== Ward results ==
Alcombe (2 seats)
Party	Candidate	Votes	%	±%
Conservative	Roger Thomas	576		
UKIP	Adrian Behan	487		
Labour	Andy Lewis	422		
Independent	Ian Melhuish	405		
Green	Venetia Moore	306		
Turnout		2,196	61.9	+28.3
Conservative hold		Swing		
UKIP gain from Independent		Swing		

Brendon Hills
Party	Candidate	Votes	%	±%
Conservative	Keith Turner	unopposed		
Conservative hold		Swing		

Carhampton & Withycombe
Party	Candidate	Votes	%	±%
Conservative	Brenda Maitland-Walker	472	65.3	−1.0
Green	Klina Jordan	251	34.7	+34.7
Majority		221	30.6	−2.0
Turnout		723	75.1	+24.1
Conservative hold		Swing		

Crowcombe & Stogumber
Party	Candidate	Votes	%	±%
Conservative	Anthony Trollope-Bellew	581	74.9	+20.1
Green	Miriam Robertson	195	25.1	+6.0
Majority		386	49.7	+21.1
Turnout		776	77.8	+24.4
Conservative hold		Swing		

Dulverton and District (2 seats)
Party	Candidate	Votes	%	±%
Conservative	Bruce Heywood	1,060		
Conservative	Nicholas Thwaites	976		
Green	Cherry Bird	433		
Turnout		2,469	73.0	+21.7
Conservative hold		Swing		
Conservative gain from Independent		Swing		

Dunster and Timberscombe
Party	Candidate	Votes	%	±%
Conservative	Bryan Leaker	424	59.6	+1.7
Green	Dave Gurnett	288	40.4	+13.8
Majority		136	19.1	−10.2
Turnout		712	72.7	+25.2
Conservative hold		Swing		

Greater Exmoor
Party	Candidate	Votes	%	±%
Conservative	Steven Pugsley	670	88.4	
Green	Caitlin Collins	88	11.6	
Majority		582	76.8	
Turnout		758	74.1	
Conservative hold		Swing		

Minehead Central (3 seats)
Party	Candidate	Votes	%	±%
Conservative	Mandy Chilcott	883		
Conservative	Andrew Hadley	848		
UKIP	Ivor Jones	583		
Labour	Lesley Culverhouse	469		
Green	Carol Stone	403		
Liberal Democrats	Jill Dillamore	388		
Turnout		3,574	62.3	+29.9
Conservative hold		Swing		
Conservative hold		Swing		
UKIP gain from Independent		Swing		

Minehead North (2 seats)
Party	Candidate	Votes	%	±%
Conservative	David Archer	unopposed		
UKIP	Terry Venner	unopposed		
Conservative hold		Swing		
UKIP gain from Independent		Swing		

Minehead South (2 seats)
Party	Candidate	Votes	%	±%
Conservative	Jean Parbrook	766		
Independent	Tom Hall	590		
Labour	Maureen Smith	385		
Green	David Taylor	355		
Turnout		2,096	68.1	+26.8
Conservative hold		Swing		
Independent gain from Labour		Swing		

Old Cleeve (2 seats)
Party	Candidate	Votes	%	±%
Conservative	Martin Dewdney	756		
Conservative	Richard Lillis	625		
Green	Mickie Ritchie	524		
Turnout		1,905	73.7	+27.7
Conservative hold		Swing		
Conservative hold		Swing		

Porlock and District (2 seats)
Party	Candidate	Votes	%	±%
Conservative	Karen Mills	755		
Conservative	Rollo Clifford	639		
UKIP	Susan Bamford	350		
Green	Mo Dewdney	306		
Green	Jon Freeman	248		
Turnout		2,298	72.5	+24.8
Conservative hold		Swing		
Conservative gain from Independent		Swing		

Quantock Vale (2 seats)
Party	Candidate	Votes	%	±%
Conservative	Chris Morgan	665		
Conservative	Susan Goss	570		
Independent	Paul Tipney	478		
Green	Katherine Attwater	299		
Turnout		2,012	72.8	+27.7
Conservative hold		Swing		
Conservative hold		Swing		

Watchet (3 seats)
Party	Candidate	Votes	%	±%
Conservative	David Westcott	936		
Conservative	Rosemary Woods	630		
Labour	Peter Murphy	563		
Independent	Loretta Whetlor	550		
Conservative	David Chadwick	506		
Green	Izzy Silvester	462		
Liberal Democrats	Tony Bowden	430		
Independent	Cosmo Johnson	404		
Labour	Robin Nuttall	393		
Turnout		4,874	64.8	+26.3
Conservative hold		Swing		
Conservative hold		Swing		
Labour hold		Swing		

West Quantock
Party	Candidate	Votes	%	±%
Conservative	Geoffrey Dowding	573	75.3	+4.7
Green	Jamie Robertson	188	24.7	−4.7
Majority		385	50.6	+9.5
Turnout		761	82.1	+27.3
Conservative hold		Swing		

Williton (2 seats)
Party	Candidate	Votes	%	±%
Independent	Hugh Davies	915		
Independent	Ian Aldridge	546		
Conservative	Robert McDonald	467		
Independent	Guy Denton	310		
Green	Sally Lowndes	220		
Turnout		2,458	64.6	+25.1
Independent hold		Swing		
Independent hold		Swing		

== By-elections between 2015 and 2019 ==
A by-election was held in Dunster and Timberscombe ward on 23 March 2017 after the resignation of Conservative councillor Bryan Leaker. Leaker's vacated seat was won by the Liberal Democrat candidate Peter Pilkington, with a 49.7% share of the vote.
