= 2003 West Somerset District Council election =

2003 UK local government election

Map of the results of the 2003 West Somerset District Council election. Conservatives in blue, independents in grey, Labour in red and Liberal Democrats in yellow.

The 2003 West Somerset District Council election took place on 1 May 2003 to elect members of West Somerset District Council in Somerset, England. The whole council was up for election and the Conservative Party stayed in overall control of the council.

== Election result ==
West Somerset local election result 2003
Party	Seats	Gains	Losses	Net gain/loss	Seats %	Votes %	Votes	+/−
Conservative	18	3	3	0	58.1	42.1	7,157	-1.9
Independent	9	2	3	-1	29.0	29.2	4,959	+15.9
Labour	2	0	0	0	6.5	16.7	2,837	-8.9
Liberal Democrats	2	1	0	+1	6.5	10.7	1,823	-5.6
UKIP	0	0	0	0	0.0	1.3	217	+1.3

5 Conservatives, 2 independents and 1 Liberal Democrat were unopposed at the election. One of the independent councillors, Michael Gammon, took the Conservative whip.

== Ward results ==
Alcombe East (2)
Party	Candidate	Votes	%	±%
Conservative	Jamie Anderson	265		
Conservative	Nicolas Messarra	262		
Labour	Valerie Welch	138		
Labour	Marcus Kravis	108		
Turnout		773	20.9	−3.4
Conservative hold		Swing		
Conservative hold		Swing		

Alcombe West (2)
Party	Candidate	Votes	%	±%
Labour	Simon Stokes	379		
Labour	Ivor Gibbon	368		
Conservative	John Hickman	285		
Conservative	Pamela Hawkins	248		
Turnout		1,280	34.8	−4.4
Labour hold		Swing		
Labour hold		Swing		

Aville Vale
Party	Candidate	Votes	%	±%
Conservative	Roger Webber	361	78.5	
Independent	Andrew Kelsey	98	21.4	
Majority		263	57.3	
Turnout		459	49.2	
Conservative hold		Swing		

Brompton Ralph and Haddon
Party	Candidate	Votes	%	±%
Independent	David Gliddon	203	60.2	−23.6
Conservative	Geoffrey Day	134	39.8	+39.8
Majority		69	20.5	−47.0
Turnout		337	44.9	+6.3
Independent gain from Conservative		Swing		

Carhampton and Withycombe
Party	Candidate	Votes	%	±%
Liberal Democrats	Peter Humber	unopposed		
Liberal Democrats hold		Swing		

Crowcombe and Stogumber
Party	Candidate	Votes	%	±%
Conservative	Vivian Brewer	unopposed		
Conservative hold		Swing		

Dulverton and Brushford (2)
Party	Candidate	Votes	%	±%
Independent	Keith Ross	718		
Independent	Michael Gammon	650		
Labour	Susan Gibb	172		
Turnout		1,540	52.5	
Independent hold		Swing		
Independent hold		Swing		

Dunster
Party	Candidate	Votes	%	±%
Conservative	Bryan Leaker	207	60.2	+10.8
Independent	John Walker	72	20.9	−29.7
Labour	John Dore	65	18.9	+18.9
Majority		135	39.2	
Turnout		344	50.4	+3.5
Conservative gain from Independent		Swing		

Exmoor
Party	Candidate	Votes	%	±%
Conservative	Steven Pugsley	unopposed		
Conservative hold		Swing		

Minehead North (3)
Party	Candidate	Votes	%	±%
Conservative	Christine Lawrence	551		
Conservative	Ann Foxhuntley	428		
Conservative	Keith Parkes	428		
Labour	David Ross	356		
Labour	John McGee	324		
Liberal Democrats	Susan Jenkins	207		
Labour	Thomas Welch	207		
UKIP	Marilyn Berrey	150		
Turnout		2,651	37.5	−1.9
Conservative hold		Swing		
Conservative hold		Swing		
Conservative hold		Swing		

Minehead South (3)
Party	Candidate	Votes	%	±%
Liberal Democrats	Martyn Snell	621		
Conservative	Terry Venner	608		
Conservative	Colin Hill	590		
Conservative	Ernest Taylor	514		
Liberal Democrats	Ian Galloway	480		
Labour	Ian Grady	306		
Turnout		3,119	41.2	−12.0
Liberal Democrats gain from Conservative		Swing		
Conservative hold		Swing		
Conservative hold		Swing		

Old Cleeve (2)
Party	Candidate	Votes	%	±%
Conservative	Pamela Driver	unopposed		
Independent	John Nethercott	unopposed		
Conservative hold		Swing		
Independent hold		Swing		

Porlock and District (2)
Party	Candidate	Votes	%	±%
Conservative	Michael Padgett	unopposed		
Conservative	Angela Palmer	unopposed		
Conservative hold		Swing		
Conservative hold		Swing		

Quantock Vale (2)
Party	Candidate	Votes	%	±%
Conservative	Terence Ayre	449		
Conservative	Mary Crowley	364		
Independent	Keith Turpin	353		
Turnout		1,166	41.8	
Conservative hold		Swing		
Conservative gain from Independent		Swing		

Quarme
Party	Candidate	Votes	%	±%
Independent	Frederick Rawle	unopposed		
Independent hold		Swing		

Watchet (3)
Party	Candidate	Votes	%	±%
Conservative	Anthony Knight	555		
Independent	Jennifer Hill	464		
Independent	David Banks	438		
Labour	Adrian Rowe	414		
Independent	Sally De Renzy-Martin	389		
Liberal Democrats	Anthony Bowden	348		
Conservative	Loretta Whetlor	288		
Liberal Democrats	Emily Booker	167		
Turnout		3,063	41.6	+5.7
Conservative gain from Independent		Swing		
Independent hold		Swing		
Independent hold		Swing		

West Quantock
Party	Candidate	Votes	%	±%
Conservative	Barbara Child	302	56.2	
Independent	Jim Laflin	235	43.8	
Majority		67	12.5	
Turnout		537	53.0	
Conservative hold		Swing		

Williton (2)
Party	Candidate	Votes	%	±%
Independent	Hugh Davies	707		
Independent	Edwin May	361		
Independent	John Holden	271		
Conservative	David Wilson	164		
Conservative	Rosemary Woods	154		
UKIP	Kenneth Matthews	67		
Turnout		1,724	45.9	+4.4
Independent hold		Swing		
Independent gain from Conservative		Swing		

== By-elections between 2003 and 2007 ==
Old Cleeve By-election 7 July 2005
Party	Candidate	Votes	%	±%
Independent	Jessica Griffith	468	72.7	
Conservative	Roy Harbour	136	21.1	
Labour	John Garland	40	6.2	
Majority		332	51.6	
Turnout		644	35.0	
Independent hold		Swing		
