= Donyatt =

Village in Somerset, England

Coordinates: 50.9261°N 2.9475°W

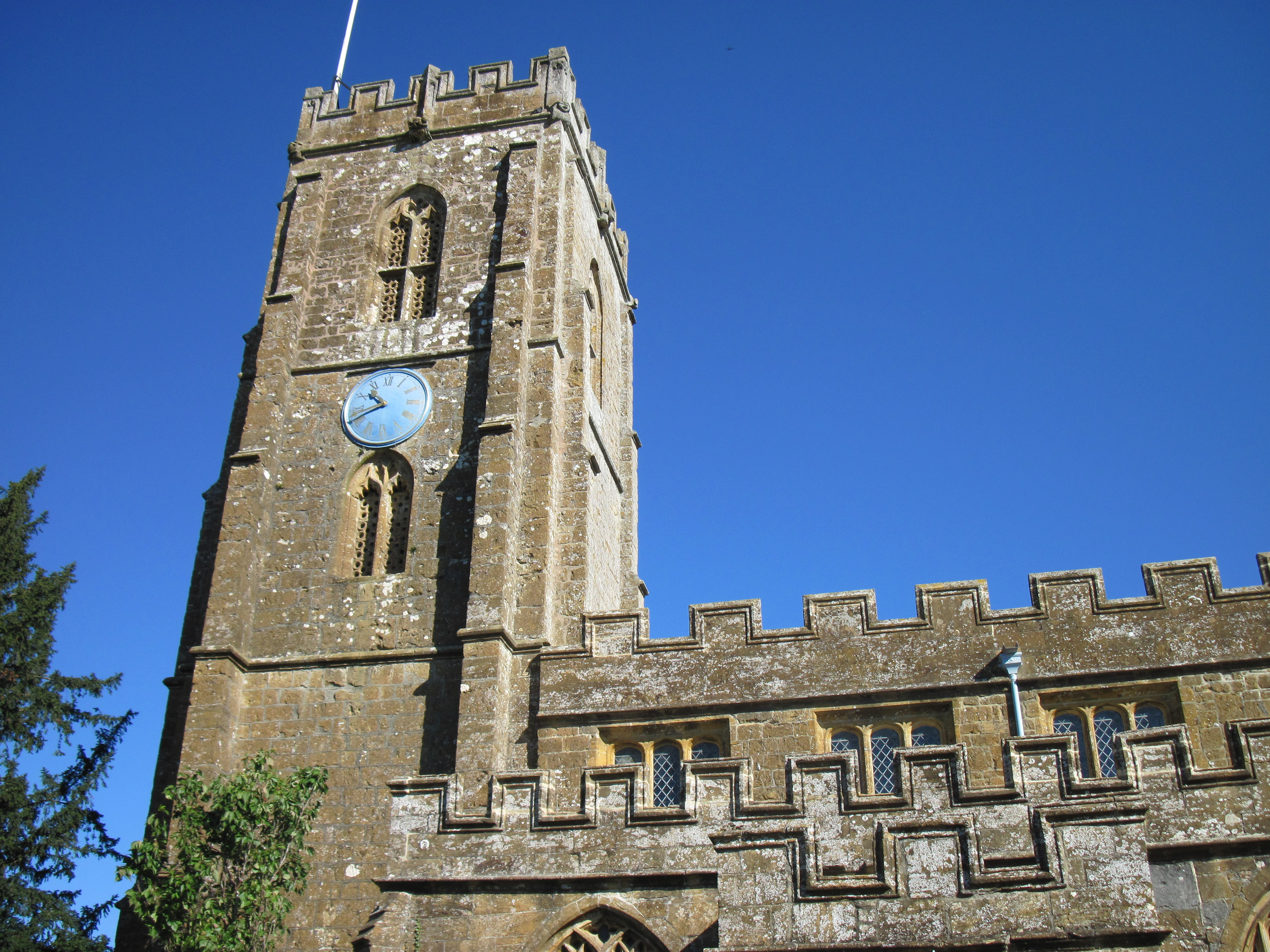
- The Blessed Virgin Mary Church, Donyatt

- Location within Somerset
- Population: 401 (2021)
- OS grid reference: ST335145
- Unitary authority: Somerset Council
- Ceremonial county: Somerset
- Region: South West
- Country: England
- Sovereign state: United Kingdom
- Post town: Ilminster
- Postcode district: TA19
- Dialling code: 01460
- Police: Avon and Somerset
- Fire: Devon and Somerset
- Ambulance: South Western
- UK Parliament: Yeovil

Donyatt is a village and civil parish in Somerset, England, situated at the source of the River Isle 5 miles (8.0 km) north of Chard. The parish, which includes the hamlet of Peasmarsh, had a population of 401 at the 2021 census.

== History ==
The village was recorded as Dunnyete meaning Dunna's gate in 725.

In the Domesday Book a park at Donyatt was held by Drogo from the Count of Mortain.

Donyatt was part of the hundred of Abdick and Bulstone.

In 1328 it was the birthplace of William Montacute, 2nd Earl of Salisbury, whose family held the manor and built a castle or fortified manor house. It had a manorial chapel and it is from this that a Sheela na Gig was recovered and is now incorporated into a private house.

The almshouses in Church Street date from 1624, and were founded under the will of John Dunster of London (died 1625). Next to them is the old school house, which was built in the early 19th century, and the old school which dates from 1871.

The Old clay puddling house, a circular thatched building, is a former pottery dating from the 18th century, when there were also woollen-mills in the village. Thirty-three examples of pottery from Donyatt have been identified from five sites in Virginia and Maryland. They were part of a wider pottery industry during the 17th and 18th centuries. Sites from which were excavated in the 1960s and 1970.

The "Sea Bridge" carries the road over a stream. It was built in the 18th century with three semi-circular arches.

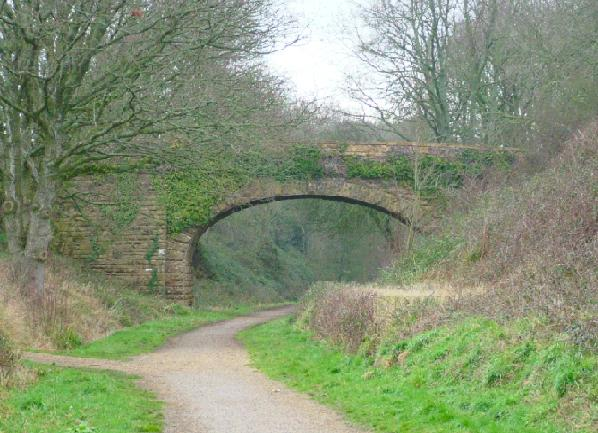
The site of Donyatt Halt, between Chard and Ilminster on the B&ER branch line

Donyatt had a small halt along the Chard Branch Line just before Ilminster, which served the local community, it was constructed from sleepers laid horizontally and pegged together to form a basic platform structure, a small over canopy "shed" served as a shelter during the winter months, access to the platform was gained by crossing over the bridge and accessing an inclined path. The Halt is next to some World War II defences used on the Taunton Stop Line, with anti-tank traps around the station. During the threat of invasion, an inspection post could be quickly set up between Donyatt and Ilminster to stop and check the trains before proceeding on the down line "to" and "from" Chard. This was achieved by placing a barrier on some cut out stones entering the Donyatt Halt, you can see these if you wonder why there are two opposite stones on the cycle path, one will have a hole cut into it to act as a pivot for the barrier.

In 2017, the village was part of an ITV News special, focussing on the 2017 United Kingdom general election and how it had repercussions for residents of the area.

== Governance ==
Donyatt has two levels of local government. At the lower level, as a civil parish it has a parish council with seven elected members.

At the upper level of local government, the parish comes under the unitary authority of Somerset Council. For elections to the council, it is in the Ilminster electoral division. Historically, Donyatt was in Chard Rural District from 1894 to 1974. It was then in South Somerset from 1974 until the creation of the unitary Somerset Council in 2023.

For elections to the House of Commons, it is part of the Yeovil county constituency.

== Religious sites ==
The Anglican parish Church of St Mary is a 15th rebuild of earlier church, where the first recorded rector was in 1255. It has been designated as a grade II* listed building.

== Demographics ==
Census population of Donyatt parish
Census	Population	Female	Male	Households	Source
2001	355	178	177	146	
2011	347	160	187	146	
2021	401	195	206	161	
