= Curland =

Village and civil parish in Somerset, England

Coordinates: 50.9523°N 3.0335°W

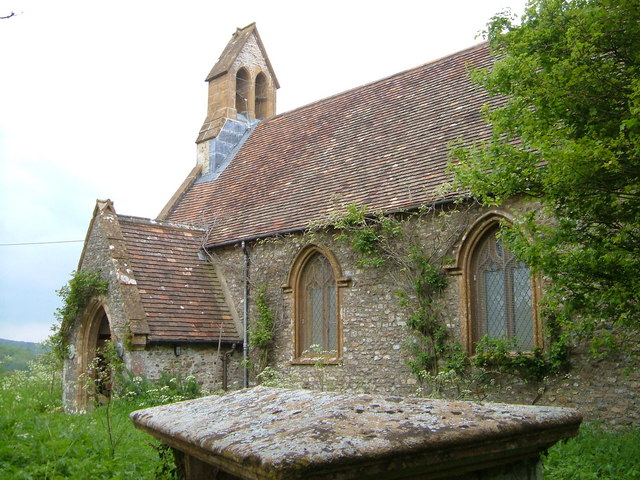
- All Saints Church

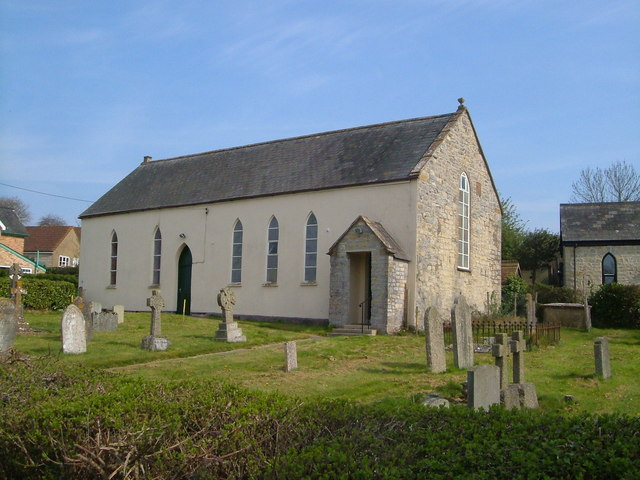
- Curland Methodist Chapel, which has now been converted into 2 houses

- Location within Somerset
- Population: 225 (2011)
- OS grid reference: ST275175
- Unitary authority: Somerset Council
- Ceremonial county: Somerset
- Region: South West
- Country: England
- Sovereign state: United Kingdom
- Post town: TAUNTON
- Postcode district: TA3
- Dialling code: 01823
- Police: Avon and Somerset
- Fire: Devon and Somerset
- Ambulance: South Western
- UK Parliament: Taunton and Wellington

Curland is a village and civil parish in Somerset, England, situated 6 miles (9.7 km) south of Taunton. The village has a population of 225. The parish includes the hamlet of Abbey Hill.

Curland is home of a thriving equestrian centre.

== History ==
The name Curland, which was Curiland in 1252, means land belonging to Curry.

Within the parish is Castle Neroche, a Norman motte-and-bailey castle on the site of an earlier hill fort.

Curland was part of the hundred of Abdick and Bulstone.

== Governance ==
The parish council has responsibility for local issues, including setting an annual precept (local rate) to cover the council's operating costs and producing annual accounts for public scrutiny. The parish council evaluates local planning applications and works with the local police, district council officers, and neighbourhood watch groups on matters of crime, security, and traffic. The parish council's role also includes initiating projects for the maintenance and repair of parish facilities, as well as consulting with the district council on the maintenance, repair, and improvement of highways, drainage, footpaths, public transport, and street cleaning. Conservation matters (including trees and listed buildings) and environmental issues are also the responsibility of the council.

For local government purposes, since 1 April 2023, the village comes under the unitary authority of Somerset Council. Prior to this, it was part of the non-metropolitan district of Somerset West and Taunton (formed on 1 April 2019) and, before this, the district of Taunton Deane (established under the Local Government Act 1972). From 1894-1974, for local government purposes, Curland was part of Taunton Rural District.

It is also part of the Taunton and Wellington county constituency represented in the House of Commons of the Parliament of the United Kingdom. It elects one Member of Parliament (MP) by the first past the post system of election. It was part of the South West England constituency of the European Parliament prior to Britain leaving the European Union in January 2020, which elected seven MEPs using the d'Hondt method of party-list proportional representation.

== Religious sites ==
The parish Church of All Saints occupies a prominent position on a hill. It was rebuilt by Benjamin Ferrey in 1856, on the site of an earlier church, but closed in 1970.

The Curland Methodist Chapel has now been converted into a single dwelling.
