= 1995 West Somerset District Council election =

1995 UK local government election

The 1995 West Somerset District Council election took place on 4 May 1995 to elect members of West Somerset District Council in Somerset, England. The whole council was up for election and Independents lost overall control of the council to no overall control.

== Election result ==
West Somerset local election result 1995
Party	Seats	Gains	Losses	Net gain/loss	Seats %	Votes %	Votes	+/−
Independent	12	0	5	-5	37.5	19.9	3,763	
Conservative	9	2	2	0	28.1	22.7	4,295	
Labour	8	5	0	+5	25.0	32.5	6,148	
Liberal Democrats	2	2	2	0	6.3	22.1	4,178	
Ind. Conservative	1	0	0	0	3.1	2.7	517	

== Ward results ==
Alcombe (3 seats)
Party	Candidate	Votes	%	±%
Labour	B Blackmore	635		
Labour	B Furney	594		
Labour	I Grady	504		
Conservative	E Griffiths	431		
Liberal Democrats	G Godsell	272		
Turnout		2,436	31.0	−33.1
Labour hold		Swing		
Labour hold		Swing		
Labour gain from Independent		Swing		

Aville Vale
Party	Candidate	Votes	%	±%
Independent	G Burnell	unopposed		
Independent hold		Swing		

Carhampton and Withycombe
Party	Candidate	Votes	%	±%
Independent	J Dyer	416	74.2	+12.0
Independent	J Butterworth	145	25.8	−12.0
Majority		271	48.3	+23.9
Turnout		561	56.0	−10.9
Independent hold		Swing		

Crowcombe and Stogumber
Party	Candidate	Votes	%	±%
Conservative	V Brewer	unopposed		
Conservative hold		Swing		

Dulverton and Brushford (2 seats)
Party	Candidate	Votes	%	±%
Independent	K Ross	592		
Independent	M Gammon	407		
Independent	P Skipper	296		
Labour	B Payne	192		
Independent	B Bird	171		
Turnout		1,658	58.0	+19.9
Independent hold		Swing		
Independent hold		Swing		

Dunster
Party	Candidate	Votes	%	±%
Liberal Democrats	A Cave-Browne-Cave	215	69.4	+25.8
Labour	J Dore	95	30.6	+30.6
Majority		120	38.7	+34.9
Turnout		310	43.0	−14.2
Liberal Democrats hold		Swing		

East Brendon
Party	Candidate	Votes	%	±%
Independent	G Day	131	55.7	
Liberal Democrats	T Cave-Browne-Cave	56	23.8	
Labour	D Burchell	48	20.4	
Majority		75	31.9	
Turnout		235	42.0	
Independent hold		Swing		

Exmoor
Party	Candidate	Votes	%	±%
Independent	S Pugsley	unopposed		
Independent hold		Swing		

Haddon
Party	Candidate	Votes	%	±%
Independent	M Scott	unopposed		
Independent hold		Swing		

Holnicote
Party	Candidate	Votes	%	±%
Independent	D Dyer	unopposed		
Independent hold		Swing		

Minehead North (3 seats)
Party	Candidate	Votes	%	±%
Conservative	M Lyons	464		
Independent	C Gibbons	449		
Labour	D Ross	394		
Conservative	J Walker	359		
Labour	J McGee	346		
Labour	M Kravis	318		
Liberal Democrats	B Barrow	201		
Liberal Democrats	M Foster	194		
Turnout		2,725	66.0	+11.4
Conservative hold		Swing		
Independent hold		Swing		
Labour gain from Conservative		Swing		

Minehead South (3 seats)
Party	Candidate	Votes	%	±%
Conservative	E Taylor	533		
Ind. Conservative	L Jowett	517		
Conservative	J Walker	509		
Labour	E Bowring	486		
Labour	I Brown	471		
Labour	P Pausey	419		
Liberal Democrats	A Parsons	379		
Liberal Democrats	M Daly	371		
Liberal Democrats	M Higgins	332		
Turnout		4,017	47.3	+3.3
Conservative hold		Swing		
Ind. Conservative hold		Swing		
Conservative hold		Swing		

Old Cleeve (2 seats)
Party	Candidate	Votes	%	±%
Independent	A Morgan	398		
Liberal Democrats	I Galloway	284		
Liberal Democrats	J Nethercott	250		
Independent	P Jackson	223		
Turnout		1,155	45.0	−2.3
Independent hold		Swing		
Liberal Democrats gain from Independent		Swing		

Porlock and Oare (2 seats)
Party	Candidate	Votes	%	±%
Conservative	E Purvis	394		
Conservative	J David	382		
Liberal Democrats	G Perkins	348		
Liberal Democrats	P Humber	270		
Turnout		1,394	58.7	
Conservative gain from Independent		Swing		
Conservative gain from Independent		Swing		

Quantock Vale (2 seats)
Party	Candidate	Votes	%	±%
Labour	K Turpin	unopposed		
Conservative	W Lovell	unopposed		
Labour gain from Conservative		Swing		
Conservative hold		Swing		

Quarme
Party	Candidate	Votes	%	±%
Independent	F Rawle	unopposed		
Independent hold		Swing		

Watchet (3 seats)
Party	Candidate	Votes	%	±%
Labour	D Banks	529		
Labour	I Aldridge	500		
Conservative	E Woods	463		
Conservative	N Edwards	458		
Independent	J Richards	395		
Liberal Democrats	A Bowden	346		
Conservative	G Horobin	302		
Liberal Democrats	M Carter	191		
Liberal Democrats	G Bevan	171		
Turnout		3,355	48.0	
Labour gain from Independent		Swing		
Labour gain from Liberal Democrats		Swing		
Conservative hold		Swing		

West Quantock
Party	Candidate	Votes	%	±%
Conservative	S Pearce	unopposed		
Conservative hold		Swing		

Williton (2 seats)
Party	Candidate	Votes	%	±%
Labour	E May	617		
Independent	F Hutchings	311		
Liberal Democrats	C Grint	154		
Liberal Democrats	H Bowden	144		
Turnout			43.0	
Labour hold		Swing		
Independent hold		Swing		

== By-elections between 1995 and 1999 ==
=== Minehead South ===
Minehead South by-election 14 November 1996
Party	Candidate	Votes	%	±%
Conservative		502	36.6	
Liberal Democrats		499	36.4	
Labour		370	27.0	
Majority		3	0.2	
Turnout		1,371	43.5	−3.8
Conservative gain from Ind. Conservative		Swing		

=== Quantock Vale ===
Quantock Vale by-election 17 July 1997
Party	Candidate	Votes	%	±%
Independent		324	74.0	
Labour		114	26.0	
Majority		213	48.2	
Turnout		441		
Independent gain from Conservative		Swing		

=== Minehead North ===
Minehead North by-election 23 April 1998
Party	Candidate	Votes	%	±%
Conservative		388	42.7	+11.9
Labour		270	29.7	+3.6
Liberal Democrats		251	27.6	+14.3
Majority		118	13.0	
Turnout		909	36.0	−3.4
Conservative gain from Independent		Swing		

=== Porlock and Oare ===
Porlock and Oare by-election 22 October 1998
Party	Candidate	Votes	%	±%
Independent		336	62.8	+62.8
Independent		199	37.2	+37.2
Majority		137	25.6	
Turnout		535		
Independent gain from Conservative		Swing		
