= West Hatch =

Village and civil parish in Somerset, England

Coordinates: 50.9832°N 3.0177°W

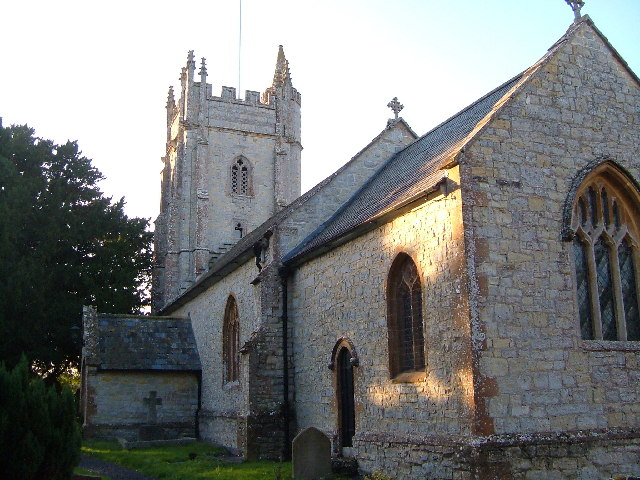
- Church of St Andrew, West Hatch

- Location within Somerset
- Population: 306 (2011)
- OS grid reference: ST286209
- Unitary authority: Somerset Council
- Ceremonial county: Somerset
- Region: South West
- Country: England
- Sovereign state: United Kingdom
- Post town: TAUNTON
- Postcode district: TA3
- Dialling code: 01823
- Police: Avon and Somerset
- Fire: Devon and Somerset
- Ambulance: South Western
- UK Parliament: Taunton and Wellington

West Hatch is a hamlet and civil parish in Somerset, England, situated 5 miles (8.0 km) south east of Taunton. It has a population of 306.

== History ==
The name of the hamlet indicates it lies to the west of Hatch Beauchamp.

The parish of West Hatch was part of the North Curry Hundred. The manor, along with North Curry, was granted to the Bishop of Wells by Richard I in 1189 and then to the dean and chapter of Wells Cathedral.

West Hatch has been the home of an RSPCA Little Creech centre since 1963, when the 17th century farm was purchased for the charity. A new purpose-built centre was constructed in 1997. During the cleanup operation after the beaching of the MSC Napoli cargo ship off the coast of Devon in January 2007, the majority of seabirds covered in oil were sent to the West Hatch RSPCA to be cleaned. It is one of two RSPCA centres in the UK used for this purpose and its work is often featured on national television.

== Governance ==
The parish council has responsibility for local issues, including setting an annual precept (local rate) to cover the council’s operating costs and producing annual accounts for public scrutiny. The parish council evaluates local planning applications and works with the local police, district council officers, and neighbourhood watch groups on matters of crime, security, and traffic. The parish council's role also includes initiating projects for the maintenance and repair of parish facilities, as well as consulting with the district council on the maintenance, repair, and improvement of highways, drainage, footpaths, public transport, and street cleaning. Conservation matters (including trees and listed buildings) and environmental issues are also the responsibility of the council.

For local government purposes, since 1 April 2023, the hamlet comes under the unitary authority of Somerset Council. Prior to this, it was part of the non-metropolitan district of Somerset West and Taunton (formed on 1 April 2019) and, before this, the district of Taunton Deane (established under the Local Government Act 1972). From 1894-1974, for local government purposes, West Hatch was part of Taunton Rural District.

It is also part of the Taunton and Wellington county constituency represented in the House of Commons of the Parliament of the United Kingdom. It elects one Member of Parliament (MP) by the first past the post system of election.

== Religious sites ==
The parish Church of St Andrew dates from the 15th century, but was extensively restored in 1861 when the north aisle and probably the vestry and organ bay were added by Benjamin Ferrey. The church was rededicated by Bishop Jim Thompson on 10 May 1992. From 1846-1849 the curate was Charles Parish, subsequently a noted botanist and plant collector.

== Notable residents ==
- John Collins VC DCM MM (1880–1951), an English recipient of the Victoria Cross, was born in the village.
