= Grade I listed buildings in Taunton Deane =

Taunton Deane is a former local government district with borough status in the English county of Somerset. In the United Kingdom, the term listed building refers to a building or other structure officially designated as being of special architectural, historical or cultural significance; in England and Wales, Grade I structures are those considered to be "buildings of exceptional interest". Listing was begun by a provision in the Town and Country Planning Act 1947. Once listed, severe restrictions are imposed on the modifications allowed to a building's structure or its fittings. In England, the authority for listing under the Planning (Listed Buildings and Conservation Areas) Act 1990 rests with Historic England, a non-departmental public body sponsored by the Department for Digital, Culture, Media and Sport; local authorities have a responsibility to regulate and enforce the planning regulations.

The district of Taunton Deane Area covers a population of approximately 100,000 in an area of 462 square kilometres (178 sq mi). It is centred on the town of Taunton, where around 60,000 of the population live and the council are based, and includes surrounding suburbs and villages.

There are 38 Grade I listed buildings in Taunton Deane. The oldest buildings are churches built before the end of the 12th century, and the Castle Bow, which has been incorporated into the Castle Hotel in Taunton but was originally a gateway into Taunton Castle. The castle was created between 1107 and 1129, when William Giffard, the Chancellor of King Henry I, fortified the bishop's hall. It was his successor, Henry of Blois, who transformed the manor-house into a castle in 1138, during the Civil War that raged during the reign of his brother, King Stephen. Taunton is also the site of Gray's Almshouses, which dates from 1635, and a building in Fore Street from the 16th century. Most of the Grade I listed buildings in Taunton Deane are Norman or medieval era churches, many of which are included in the Somerset towers, a collection of distinctive, mostly spireless Gothic church towers. Many of the more recent structures in the list are manor houses such as Cothay Manor and Greenham Barton which were built in Stawley in the 15th century and 13th century respectively. Poundisford Park and Cothelstone Manor were both built in the 16th century and Hatch Court in 1755. The most recent building included in the list is Hestercombe House, which was rebuilt in 1909.

== Buildings ==
Name	Location	Type	Completed (Note: The date given is the date used by Historic England as significant for the initial building or that of an important part in the structure's description.)	Grid ref. (Note: The grid reference is based on the British national grid reference system, sometimes known as OSGB36, used by the Ordnance Survey.) Geo-coordinates	Entry number (Note: The "List Entry Number" is a unique number assigned to each listed building and scheduled monument by Historic England.)	Image	Ref.
Castle Bow	Taunton		13th century	ST2266824571; 51°00′55″N 3°06′14″W	1060075	Castle Bow More images	
Church of All Saints	Nynehead	Parish Church	14th century	ST1378422715; 50°59′50″N 3°13′48″W	1060318	Church of All Saints More images	
Church of All Saints	Trull	Parish Church	13th century	ST2163422194; 50°59′38″N 3°07′05″W	1060446	Church of All Saints More images	
Church of St Andrew & St Mary	Pitminster	Parish Church	c. 1300	ST2206419112; 50°57′58″N 3°06′40″W	1344587	Church of St Andrew & St Mary More images	
Church of St Augustine	West Monkton	Parish Church	13th century	ST2630428453; 51°03′02″N 3°03′10″W	1060422	Church of St Augustine More images	
Church of St George	Ruishton	Parish Church	Norman	ST2636825113; 51°01′14″N 3°03′04″W	1177015	Church of St George More images	
Church of St Gregory	Stoke St Gregory	Parish Church	14th century	ST3481127154; 51°02′24″N 2°55′52″W	1060242	Church of St Gregory More images	
Church of St James	Halse	Parish Church	12th century	ST1399427740; 51°02′33″N 3°13′41″W	1060602	Church of St James More images	
Church of St Lawrence	Lydeard St Lawrence	Parish Church	c. 1350	ST1280932132; 51°04′55″N 3°14′46″W	1176126	Church of St Lawrence More images	
Church of St John the Baptist	Hatch Beauchamp	Parish Church	Norman	ST3060221122; 50°59′07″N 2°59′24″W	1060442	Church of St John the Baptist More images	
Church of St John the Baptist	Wellington		15th century	ST1408020910; 50°58′52″N 3°13′31″W	1176369	Church of St John the Baptist More images	
Church of St John the Evangelist	Taunton	Parish Church	1863	51°00′49″N 3°06′31″W	1059951	Church of St John the Evangelist More images	
Church of St Mary	Bishops Lydeard	Parish Church	Late 14th century	ST1679629761; 51°03′40″N 3°11′19″W	1059248	Church of St Mary More images	
Church of St Mary	Kingston St Mary	Parish Church	13th century	ST2229029712; 51°03′41″N 3°06′37″W	1176326	Church of St Mary More images	
Church of St Mary	West Buckland	Parish Church	13th century	ST1733720468; 50°58′40″N 3°10′44″W	1060290	Church of St Mary More images	
Church of St Mary Magdalene (Taunton Minster)	Taunton		Late 15th century	ST2288424607; 51°00′56″N 3°06′03″W	1278073	Church of St Mary Magdalene (Taunton Minster) More images	
Church of St Michael	Chipstable	Parish Church	14th century	ST0202926011; 51°01′30″N 3°23′54″W	1060255	Church of St Michael More images	
Church of St Michael	Creech St Michael	Parish Church	13th century	ST2746725288; 51°01′21″N 3°02′08″W	1344496	Church of St Michael More images	
Church of St Michael	Milverton	Parish Church	13th century	ST1217025875; 51°01′32″N 3°15′13″W	1060554	Church of St Michael More images	
Church of St Michael	Stawley	Parish Church	11th century	ST0602822631; 50°59′43″N 3°20′26″W	1307667	Church of St Michael More images	
Church of St. Peter	Langford Budville	Parish Church	15th century	ST1116322933; 50°59′56″N 3°16′02″W	1344574	Church of St. Peter More images	
Church of St Peter	Staple Fitzpaine	Parish Church	Norman	ST2637718237; 50°57′32″N 3°02′59″W	1060274	Church of St Peter More images	
Church of St Peter & St Paul	Churchstanton	Parish Church	14th century	ST1957514530; 50°55′29″N 3°08′44″W	1060267	Church of St Peter & St Paul More images	
Church of St Peter & St Paul	Combe Florey	Parish Church	15th century	ST1505631168; 51°04′25″N 3°12′50″W	1175444	Church of St Peter & St Paul More images	
Church of St Peter & St Paul	North Curry	Parish Church	Norman	ST3194725569; 51°01′32″N 2°58′18″W	1344525	Church of St Peter & St Paul More images	
Church of the Holy Cross	Thornfalcon	Parish Church	14th century	ST2833423908; 51°00′36″N 3°01′22″W	1177251	Church of the Holy Cross More images	
Church of St Thomas of Canterbury	Cothelstone	Parish Church	12th century	ST1813931846; 51°04′48″N 3°10′12″W	1175656	Church of St Thomas of Canterbury More images	
Cothay Manor	Stawley	Manor House	c. 1480	ST0850421301; 50°59′02″N 3°18′17″W	1176185	Cothay Manor More images	
Gatehouse, Cothelstone Manor	Cothelstone	Gatehouse	Mid 16th century	ST1816831768; 51°04′46″N 3°10′10″W	1059192	Gatehouse, Cothelstone Manor More images	
Garden walls, paving and steps on the south front of Hestercombe House	Cheddon Fitzpaine	Orangery		ST2410528662; 51°03′08″N 3°05′03″W	1060514	Garden walls, paving and steps on the south front of Hestercombe House More images	
Gray's Almshouses	Taunton		1635	ST2307424504; 51°00′53″N 3°05′53″W	1232341	Gray's Almshouses More images	
Greenham Barton	Stawley	House	built 1279	ST0815620047; 50°58′21″N 3°18′34″W	1176225	Greenham Barton More images	
Hatch Court	Hatch Beauchamp		1755	ST3064520981; 50°59′03″N 2°59′22″W	1060405	Hatch Court More images	
Orangery about 50 metres east of Hestercombe House	Cheddon Fitzpaine	Orangery	1909	ST2420628695; 51°03′09″N 3°04′58″W	1175994	Orangery about 50 metres east of Hestercombe House More images	
Poundisford Park	Pitminster	Manor House	c. 1550	ST2227020202; 50°58′33″N 3°06′31″W	1060307	Poundisford Park More images	
Shell keep castle, part of the associated outer bailey, ninth century cemetery and a Civil War siegework at Taunton Castle	Taunton		1138	51°00′57″N 3°06′18″W	1013541	Shell keep castle, part of the associated outer bailey, ninth century cemetery and a Civil War siegework at Taunton Castle More images	
The cottage at the rear of No 15 Tudor Tavern	Taunton		1578	ST2272624452; 51°00′51″N 3°06′11″W	1060025	The cottage at the rear of No 15 Tudor Tavern More images	

== See also ==
- Grade I listed buildings in Somerset
- List of Somerset towers
- Grade II* listed buildings in Taunton Deane
