= Church of All Saints, Trull =

Church in Somerset, England

Church of All Saints
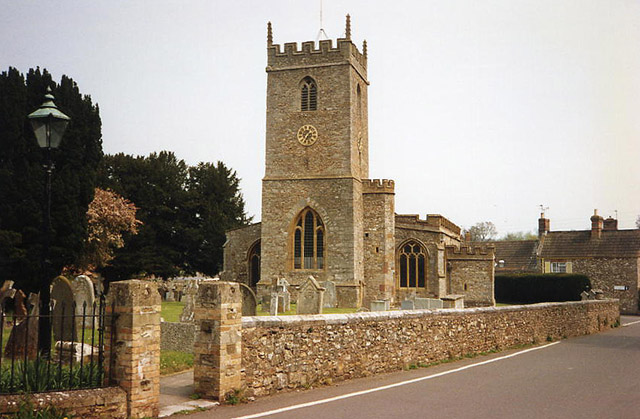

- Location within Somerset

General information
- Location: Trull, England
- Coordinates: 50.9938°N 3.1181°W
- Completed: 15th century

The Church of All Saints in Trull, Somerset, England has a tower dating from the 13th century; the rest is 15th-century. The building has been designated as a Grade I listed building.

The church was served by the monks of Taunton Priory until 1308.

The east window, dating from the 15th century, depicts the crucifixion with St John and the Mother of Jesus at the foot of the Cross. The pulpit is believed to date from the 16th century, moving to its current position from the north arcade as part of a Victorian restoration around 1863. The extensive mid-16th century bench ends include a unique pre-Reformation procession.

The lower portion of the tower is the oldest part of the building, with the south aisle being built in the 14th century and the north aisle in the 15th. The tower holds six bells, two of which were cast before Protestant Reformation.

The parish is part of the benefice of Trull with Angersleigh within the Taunton deanery.

In 1899 a stained glass window by Charles Eamer Kempe in memory of Alexander and Juliana Horatia Ewing was installed in the church, overlooking their graves.

== See also ==
- Grade I listed buildings in Taunton Deane
- List of Somerset towers
- List of ecclesiastical parishes in the Diocese of Bath and Wells
