= St Michael's Church, Creech St Michael =

Church in Somerset, England

Church of St Michael
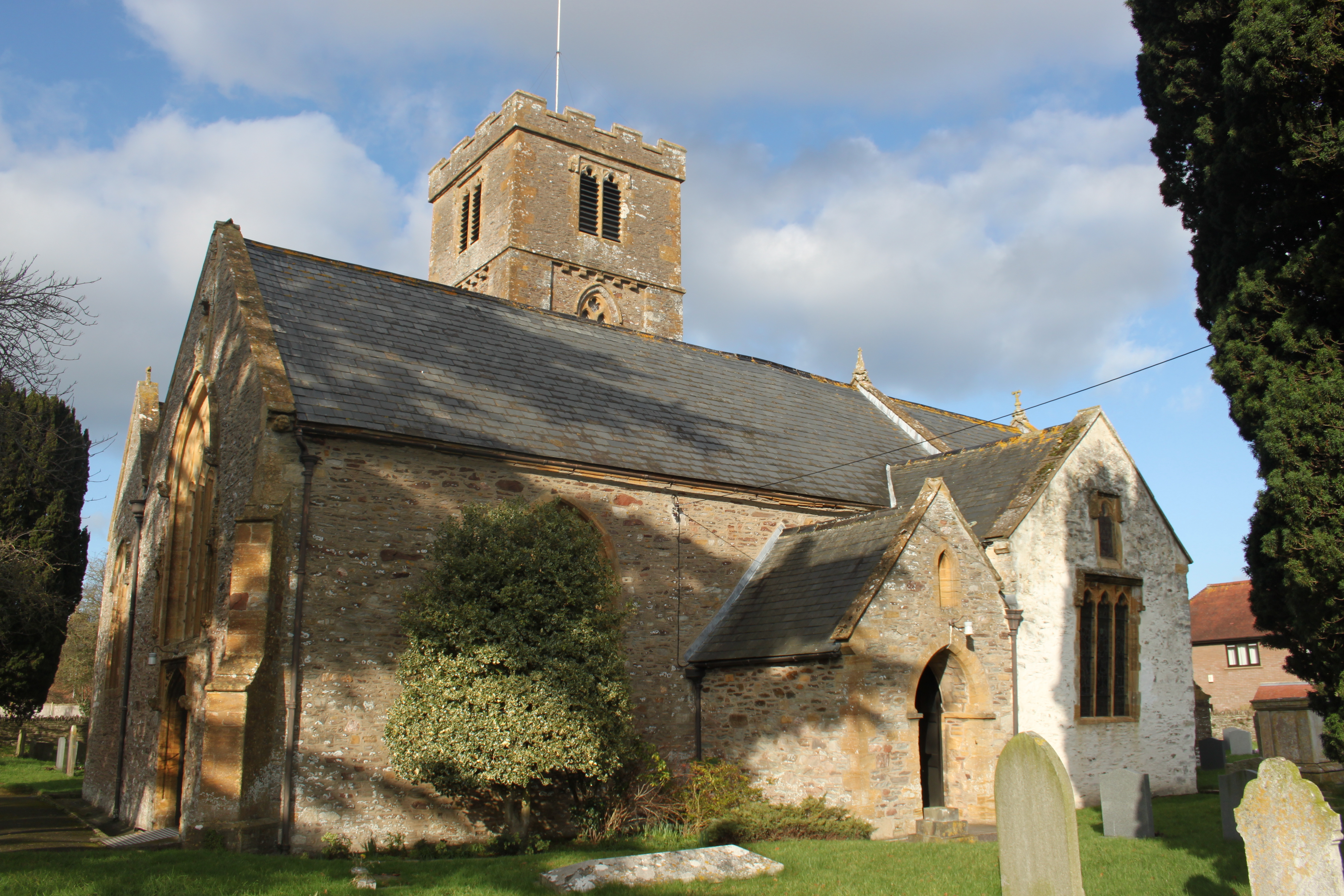

- Location within Somerset

General information
- Location: Creech St Michael, England
- Coordinates: 51.0224°N 3.0354°W
- Completed: 13th century

The Church of St Michael, which stands next to the River Tone in Creech St Michael, Somerset, England dates from the 13th century and has been designated as a Grade I listed building.

The church came into the ownership of Montacute Priory in 1362.

The musicians gallery was built in 1826 and was used until the installation of the Holdich organ in 1985. The organ had previously been in Rockwell Green Baptist Church since about 1860.

== See also ==
- List of Grade I listed buildings in Taunton Deane
- List of towers in Somerset
- List of ecclesiastical parishes in the Diocese of Bath and Wells
