= Hill Farm, Stawley =

Farmhouse in Stawley, Somerset, England

Hill Farm
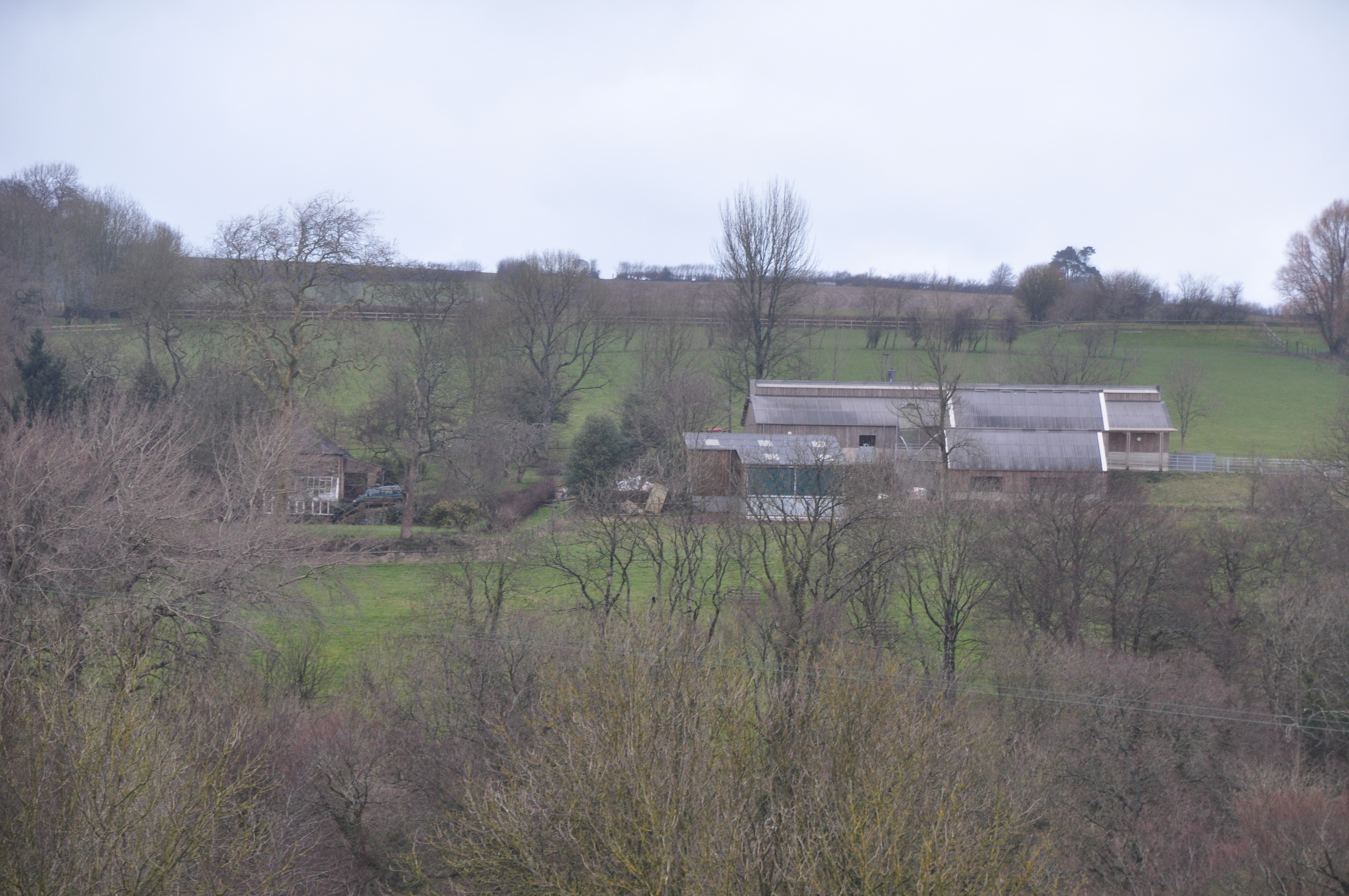

- Location within Somerset
- 50.9884°N 3.3384°W
- Location: Stawley, Somerset, England

Listed Building – Grade II*
- Official name: Hill Farmhouse
- Designated: 26 March 1984
- Reference no.: 1176991

Listed Building – Grade II
- Official name: The Malthouse 10 metres East of Hill Farmhouse
- Designated: 26 March 1984
- Reference no.: 1177013

Hill Farm in Stawley, Somerset, England was built in the late 16th century. It is a Grade II* listed building.

== History ==
The farmhouse was built in the late 16th or early 17th century. It was an outlying farm of Cothay Manor.

The farm now has around 100 goats and makes three kinds of cheese. In 2008 a new barn, milking parlour and dairy was constructed.

== Architecture ==
The L-shaped stone building has a slated cruck roof. Approximately 10 metres (33 ft) east of the main farmhouse is a disused malt house.
