= St Michael's Church, Raddington =

Church in Somerset, England

Church of St Michael
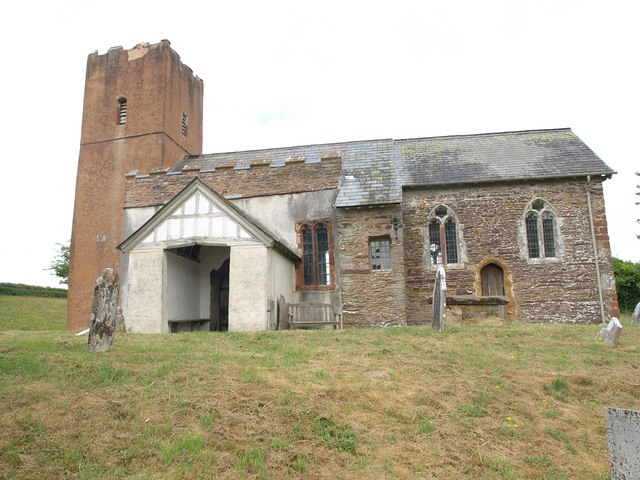

- Location within Somerset

General information
- Location: Raddington, Chipstable, England
- Coordinates: 51.0255°N 3.3981°W
- Completed: 13th century

Website
- wiveychurches.org.uk

The Church of St Michael at Raddington in the parish of Chipstable, Somerset, England, dates from the 13th and 14th centuries and has been designated as a grade I listed building.

The 13th-century tower was restored in 1695 and rendered in the 20th century. Two of the four bells which hung in the tower until around 1971 were cast in the 1370s. The windows date from the 14th or 15th century, as do the bells, which were renovated and re-hung in 1986.

Under the plaster on the walls of the nave are wall paintings. The chancel screen dates from the 14th century. The font is of a 13th-century Purbeck type. The carved bosses in the roof include a Green Man.

The parish is part of the benefice of Wiveliscombe and the Hills within the deanery of Tone.

== See also ==
- Grade I listed buildings in Taunton Deane
- List of Somerset towers
