= Greenham Barton =

Grade I listed manor house in Somerset, England

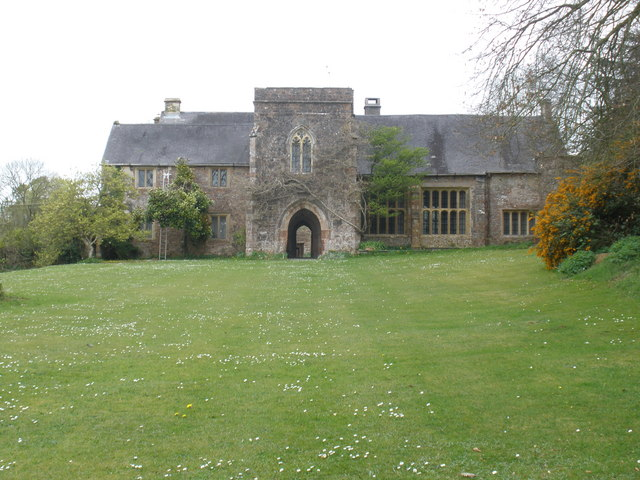

- Location within Somerset

General information
- Location: Stawley, England
- Coordinates: 50°58′21″N 3°18′34″W
- Completed: 15th century

Greenham Barton is a 13th-century manor house in the civil parish of Stawley, Somerset, England (at Greenham, west of Wellington in Somerset). Built in 1279, it has been designated as a Grade I listed building.

In early 14th century the local lords of the manor were the Bluett and Cothay families, who owned both the nearby Cothay Manor and Greenham Barton. The manor came to the Bluett family around 1300 when Sir Walter Bluett married the daughter of the then owner Simon de Gryndenham. Later - in the early 14th century - John Bluett, the elder son of the union of the Bluett family with the Cothay family, inherited Greenham Barton, with the younger son Richard inheriting Cothay. The nearby manor of Holcombe Rogus, in Devon, was acquired by the Bluett family in the early 15th century, where they resided at Holcombe Court until 1858.

The original house consisted of living quarters around a courtyard with the Great Hall being modernised in the early-mid 16th century.

During World War I the condition of the house deteriorated until it was bought by a Mr Fry in 1920 and renovated. Further restoration has been undertaken since 1968 when it was bought by Mr ER Willis.

== See also ==
- List of Grade I listed buildings in Taunton Deane
