= Church of All Saints, Chipstable =

Church of All Saints
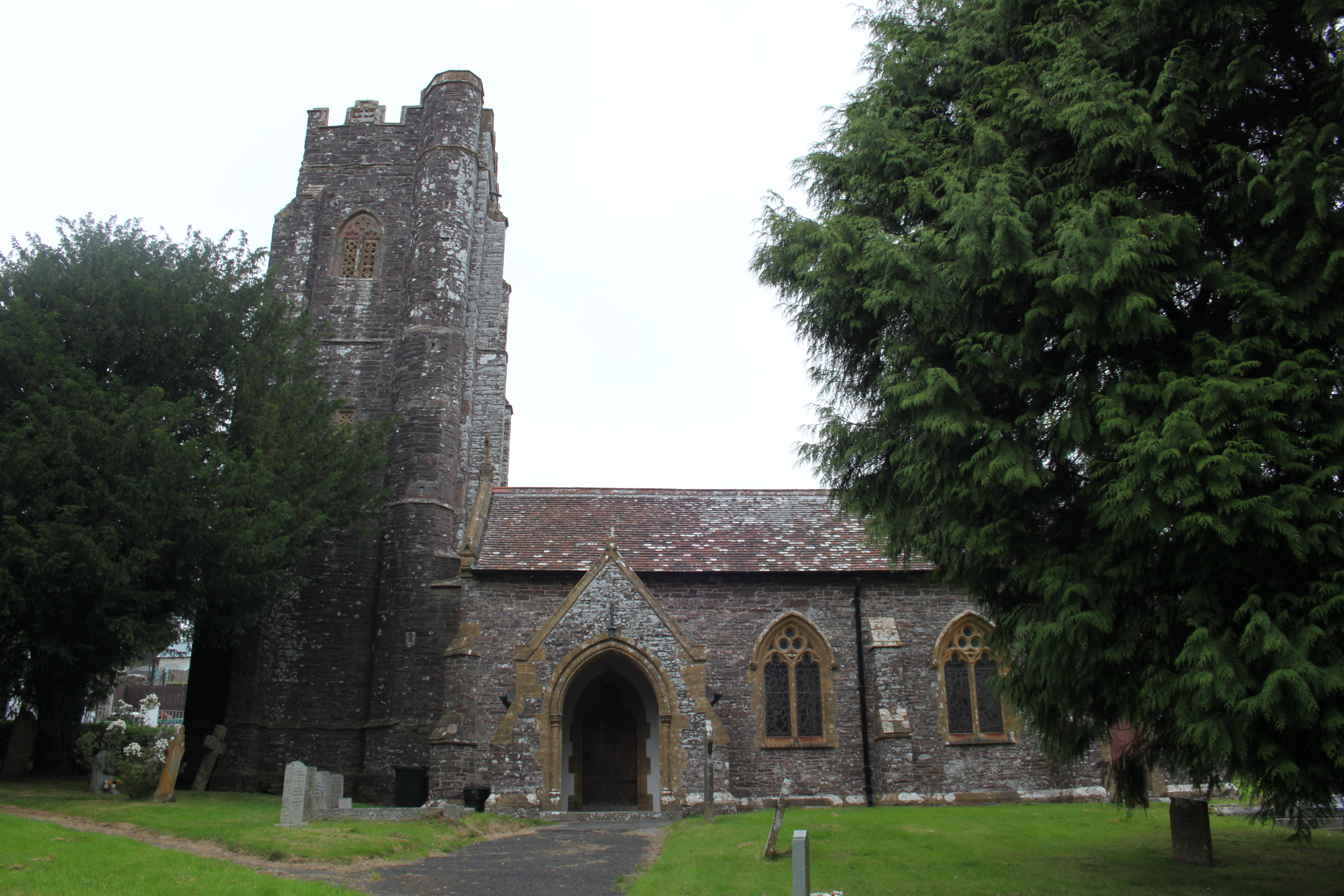

- Location in Somerset
- 51.0356°N 3.3667°W
- Location: Chipstable, Somerset
- Country: England
- Denomination: Anglican
- Website: www.wiveychurches.org.uk/index.html
Further details
History
Founded	Probably early 13th century
Administration
Diocese	Bath and Wells
Archdeaconry	Taunton
Deanery	Tone
Parish	Chipstable
Clergy
Rector	Rev. David Widdows

The Church of All Saints is an Anglican church in Chipstable, Somerset, England which probably dates from the early 13th century. It is located in the deanery of Tone, within the diocese of Bath and Wells. It is a Grade II* listed building.

== Usage ==
The church is part of the Church of England, and forms a combined benefice with a number of other churches around Wiveliscombe, known as Wiveliscombe and the Hills. The churches share the same rector, The Reverend David Widdows, and are within the deanery of Tone, within the diocese of Bath and Wells. The church was a sole benefice until 1929.

== History and architecture ==
A church has been located in Chipstable at least as far back as the early 11th century, and was recorded in the Domesday Book. The earliest known rector was "Stephen, Parson of Cyppestable", who was present in 1248. The church of Chipstable was administered by the monks of Muchelney Abbey until the Dissolution of the Monasteries in 1538. In 1531, the Church of All Saints was dedicated.

The church website dates the church tower to around 1239, although the Historic England listing describes it as 15th century. The tower is crenellated, and features what Nikolaus Pevsner describes as "handsome capitals of the three-bay arcade". Each of the four side of the three-stage tower has demi-figures of angels. The nave was rebuilt in 1869 by Benjamin Ferrey, in red sandstone with hamstone dressings, reusing the stone from the original building where possible. The nave has twin aisles, and a south porch which retains a 15th-century doorway, though the door is 19th century. The building combines Decorated and Perpendicular Gothic styles. The bell tower contained five bells until 1901, when a sixth was added. Two square-headed bench ends were retained when the building was renovated, dating from around 1530, featuring a pestle on one, and a huntsman on the other. A two-storey rectory dates from at least the early 17th century, and was rebuilt and enlarged in 1870. It was sold just over 100 years later, and is now known as "The Grange. A new rectory was built in 1975 in replacement.

In the churchyard, a group of three chest tombs are Grade II listed; the oldest is from the 17th century, though with 18th century alterations, while the other two are 18th and 19th century respectively. The English Heritage listing noted that all three are damaged, and were overgrown when the survey was carried out. The name of John Hastings is visible on the oldest tomb, but the wording on the others was illegible.

== See also ==
- List of ecclesiastical parishes in the Diocese of Bath and Wells
