= Church of St Andrew & St Mary, Pitminster =

Church in Somerset, England

Church of St Andrew & St Mary
- Location within Somerset

General information
- Location: Pitminster, England
- Coordinates: 50.9661°N 3.1110°W
- Completed: c. 1300

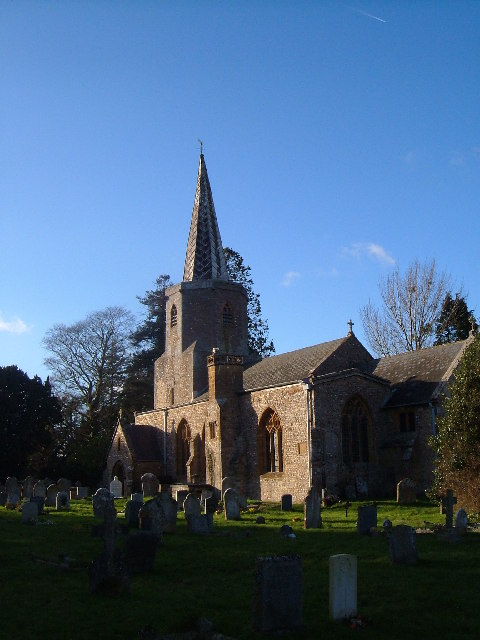
The church in 2005

The Church of St Andrew & St Mary in Pitminster, Somerset, England was built around 1300 and has been designated as a Grade I listed building.

The current church was built circa 1300 on the site of an earlier Saxon church and expanded in the 15th century.

During a Victorian restoration in 1869, George Gilbert Scott rebuilt the north aisle and south porch and rebuilt the west chapel. In addition he replaced the clerestory windows and rebuilt the chancel arch. in 1937 the chancel was restored by J.D. Caroe and in 1979 the lady chapel was also restored.

The primary building material of the structure is random rubble local stone with dressed stones features of ham stone. The roof is predominantly slate with coped verges with lead roof on the spire and south porch.

The tower is in the west and is of two square stages. The lead covered spire is of octagonal shape and is connected to the tower via a quatrefoil parapet and two-light bell-opening. The west window is of three lights and the vestry is of two lights. The vestry is supported by setback buttresses while the south aisle is structurally supported with diagonal buttresses. The porch is of the 19th century and is gabled and single story and is diagonally buttressed. The opening of the porch is moulded as is the inner doorway. The door into the church is also of the 19th century and is accented with decorative hinges. To the right of the door on the porch side are two three light windows with right flanking stepped buttresses. The church also has rood stair turrets on either side of the chancel arch indicative of the one time existence of a rood screen and rood loft; which the stairs provided access to. Such screens were largely removed in the aftermath of the English reformation as they were seen as remnants of Catholicism.

A select few 16th-century bench (pew) ends remain though most are of the 19th century. The pulpit is a handsome example of the early 17th century with a sounding board above it from the Bluecoat school in Frome; most likely originally created by London craftsman.

Notably, nearby the organ is linenfold panelling.

The font is of the 15th century and is octagonal and Perpendicular is form. It features quatrefoil decorated panels, two carved with depictions of St George and St James of Conpostela, later panel depicting Christ.

The lectern is of brass and is in memory of William Amasa Copp who died in 1901.

Altar and other sanctuary fixtures are from the W.D. Caroe restoration.

There are remains of medieval stained glass in upper lights of the lady chapel north window. Otherwise, the church is a collection of late 19th to post war 20th-century glass including that in the lady chapel east window (of 1894) and west window (of 1904), both by Keape. The east window is of 1881.

The interior is distinguished by effigy tombs of three generations of the Colles family who were lords of the manor in the 16th and 17th centuries.

In early 2020, during the Coronavirus pandemic, the church suffered heritage damage.

The Anglican parish is part of the Blackdown benefice within the archdeaconry of Taunton.

== See also ==
- List of Grade I listed buildings in Taunton Deane
- List of towers in Somerset
- List of ecclesiastical parishes in the Diocese of Bath and Wells
