= Gray's Almshouses =

Almshouses in Taunton, Somerset, England

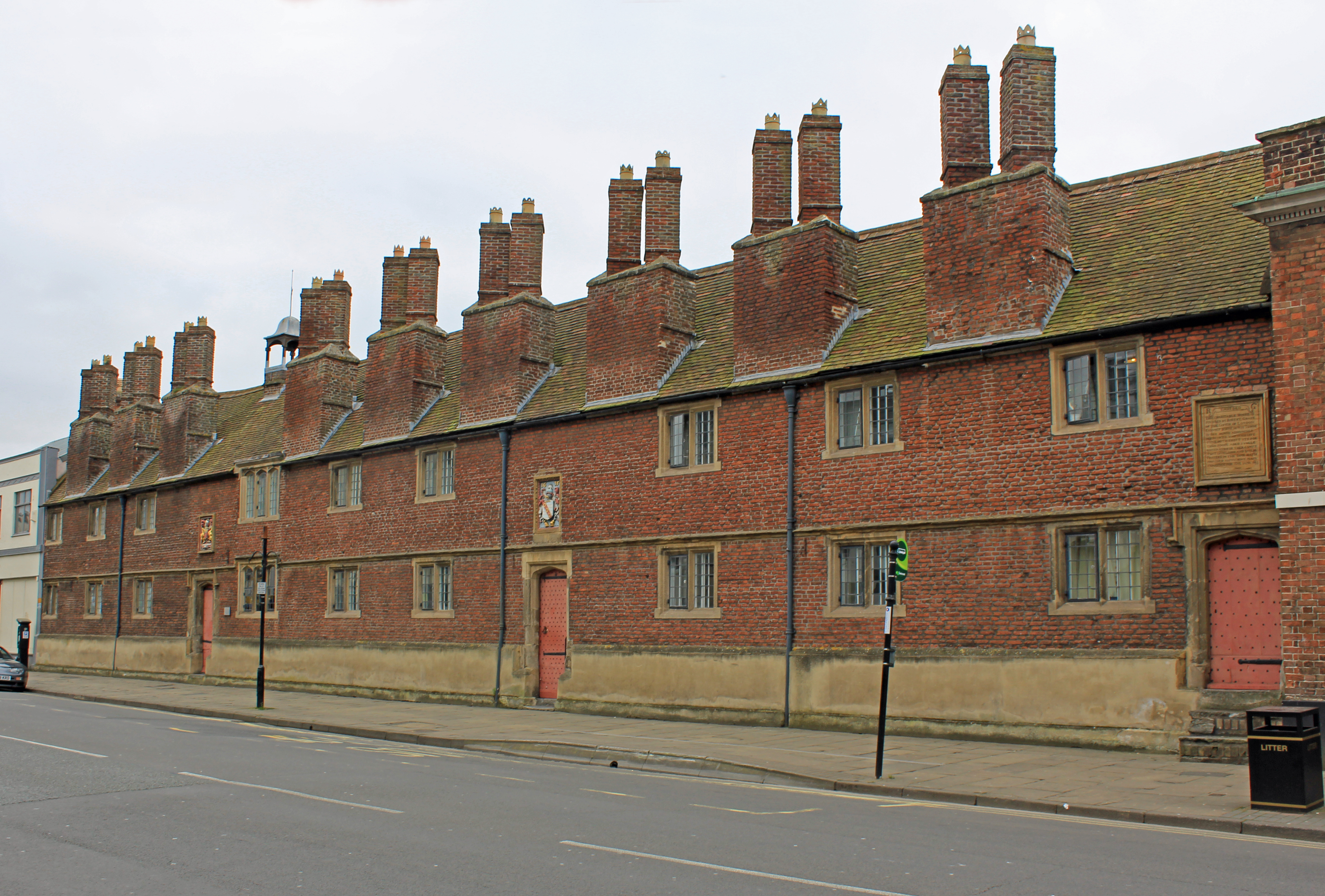
- Gray's Almshouses

- Location within Somerset

General information
- Architectural style: Jacobean
- Location: Taunton, England
- Coordinates: 51.01475°N 3.09801°W
- Construction started: 1635
- Completed: 1696

Gray's Almshouses is a terrace of almshouses in Taunton, Somerset, England, founded in 1635 by the wealthy cloth-merchant Robert Gray, whose monument survives in the Church of St Mary Magdalene. The building is one of the oldest surviving in Taunton and is one of the earliest brick buildings in the county. The Almshouses were designed to provide accommodation for six men and ten women and for a reader who was to act as chaplain and schoolmaster. It is a Grade I listed building as designated by English Heritage. Following renovation in the late twentieth century it now comprises sheltered accommodation of nine flats for the elderly.

== History ==
Robert Gray was born in Taunton in 1570 and made his fortune in the City of London, where he became a Citizen and a member of the Worshipful Company of Merchant Taylors. He owned a shop in Bread Street in the city, from which he traded in cloths purchased by him at provincial fairs which he then finished and dyed. His business was successful and in 1635 his great wealth enabled him to build almshouses in his town of birth, on East Street, next to the house in which he had been born. The initial building which Gray built in the parish of St Mary Magdalene in Taunton contained apartments for ten poor women, with a chapel, schoolroom, and a room for a reader, who acted as chaplain and schoolmaster. The reader was obliged to teach ten poor children from the parish to read and write. In addition Gray gave an endowment to his almshouses of freehold land valued at £2,000, the profits of which were to be paid to the poor, with each receiving eight shillings a month. (Note: According to The National Archives' currency converter, £2,000 in 1630 would be the equivalent of £178,320 in 2005, while that amount in 1640 would be the equivalent of £171,600 in 2005.) Although Gray had intended his Taunton almshouse to be managed by the Merchant Taylors' Company, hence their arms over one of the doorways, they refused to accept the trusteeship as they judged the distance from London was too great and his bequest allowed for no travel costs. Thus they passed the trusteeship on to selected townsmen of Taunton. A further building to house six poor men was planned by Gray but was delayed by his death in 1638, and was completed by the trustees as directed in his will, but not until 1696, having been delayed by the Civil War and legal matters. Gray also bequeathed generously in his will (proved in 1639) to the Merchant Taylors' Company, leaving them £1,500 in cash and a reversionary interest in a further £1,000, for the almswomen of the company. In 1884 this was producing annual income of £106 12s, credited to the company's almshouse account. Further donations to Gray's Taunton almshouses were added in the eighteenth century by John Noble and John Coles which resulted in the allowance for the poor, by that time paid weekly, to be increased to three shillings per week. Whilst the brick construction of Gray's almshouses protected them during the Civil War, the adjoining wooden Pope's almshouses were burnt down by the Royalist troops during the Siege of Taunton.

== Architecture ==
Gray's almshouses are the largest in Taunton, being 130 feet (40 m) in length, as stated in Joshua Toulmin's 1822 history of Taunton. The building is of two-storeys, with matching mullioned windows on each level, with three entrances. Above two of the entrances are displayed sculpted coats of arms: those of the Merchant Taylors Company and those of Robert Gray, namely Barry of six azure and argent, on a bend gules three annulets or, being a differenced version of the arms of the prominent and ancient Anglo-Norman noble House of Grey, branches of which held many peerage and other titles in England, including Baron Grey de Wilton (1295), Baron Ferrers of Groby (1299), Baron Grey of Codnor (1299,1397), Baron Grey de Ruthyn (1324), Earl of Tankerville (1419, 1695), Earl of Huntingdon (1471), Marquess of Dorset (1475), Baron Grey of Powis (1482), Duke of Suffolk (1551), Baronet Grey of Chillingham (1619); Baron Grey of Werke (1623/4), Earl of Stamford (1628).

There are nine chimney stacks, each with two chimneys set diagonally. The building is of red brick, the brickwork being the same on the newer and older sections, which are separated by a straight joint. The almshouses are among the oldest surviving brick buildings in Somerset, and it is unlikely there are any older, according to the Somerset Archaeological and Natural History Society. The roof is made of clay tiles. Brian Bailey describes the buildings as conforming to an "austere Jacobean style", with the pair of coats of arms over the doors being the "only departure here from unadorned severity of style."

== Inscribed tablet ==
A contemporary stone tablet is affixed to the facade inscribed as follows:

RC Laus Deo This charitable worke is founded by Robert Graye of the Cittie of London, Esquier, borne in this towne in the howse adioyninge heereunto who in his lyfe tyme doth erect ytt for tenn poore aged syngle women and for ther competent livelihood and daylie prayers in the same hath provided sufficient maintenaunce for the same 1635

== Current usage ==
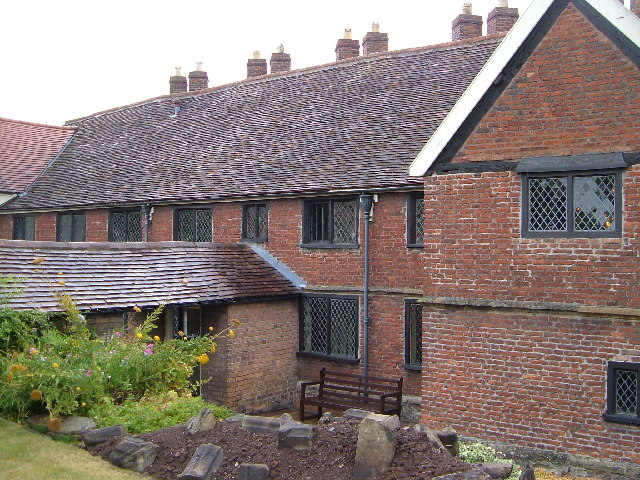
The rear of the almshouses, photographed in 2005

On 4 June 1952 the building was designated Grade I listed by English Heritage, categorising it as a building "of exceptional interest". The Taunton Heritage Trust took control of Gray's Almshouses in the 1960s and in 1989 they conducted a complete refurbishment of the property with the help of grants from the Tenant Services Authority and English Heritage. At present the building comprises nine flats providing sheltered housing for pensioners, with a laundry room and a communal room. In 2004 a competition was held for students of interior design at Somerset College of Arts and Technology to suggest improvements to the décor and lighting to help brighten the flats and as a result various changes were made to the interiors.

== See also ==
- List of Grade I listed buildings in Taunton Deane
