= Chipstable =

Village and civil parish in Somerset, England

Coordinates: 51.0357°N 3.3660°W

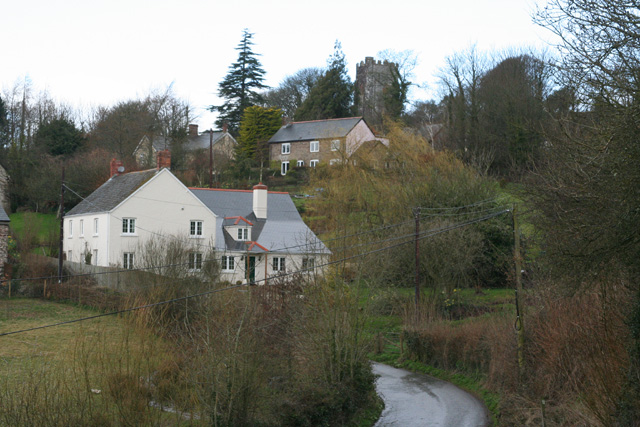
- Chipstable

- Location within Somerset
- Population: 309 (2011)
- OS grid reference: ST043271
- Unitary authority: Somerset Council
- Ceremonial county: Somerset
- Region: South West
- Country: England
- Sovereign state: United Kingdom
- Post town: Taunton
- Postcode district: TA4
- Police: Avon and Somerset
- Fire: Devon and Somerset
- Ambulance: South Western
- UK Parliament: Tiverton and Minehead

Chipstable is a village and civil parish in Somerset, England, situated beside Heydon Hill 10 miles (16.1 km) west of Taunton. The parish has a population of 309.

The parish includes Raddington and Waterrow.

== History ==
The name Chipstable means "Cippa's post".

The manor was held by Muchelney Abbey from the Norman Conquest until the Dissolution of the Monasteries, and then passing to the Bluets of Greenham in Stawley. The parishes of Chipstable and Raddington were part of the Williton and Freemanners Hundred.

The village of Waterrow developed from hamlets called east and west Skirdle.

== Governance ==
The parish council has responsibility for local issues, including setting an annual precept (local rate) to cover the council's operating costs and producing annual accounts for public scrutiny. The parish council evaluates local planning applications and works with the local police, district council officers, and neighbourhood watch groups on matters of crime, security, and traffic. The parish council's role also includes initiating projects for the maintenance and repair of parish facilities, as well as consulting with the district council on the maintenance, repair, and improvement of highways, drainage, footpaths, public transport, and street cleaning. Conservation matters (including trees and listed buildings) and environmental issues are also the responsibility of the council.

For local government purposes, since 1 April 2023, the village comes under the unitary authority of Somerset Council. Prior to this, it was part of the non-metropolitan district of Somerset West and Taunton (formed on 1 April 2019) and, before this, the district of Taunton Deane (established under the Local Government Act 1972). From 1894-1974, for local government purposes, Chipstable was part of Wellington Rural District.

It is also part of the Tiverton and Minehead county constituency represented in the House of Commons of the Parliament of the United Kingdom. It elects one Member of Parliament (MP) by the first past the post system of election, and was part of the South West England constituency of the European Parliament prior to Britain leaving the European Union in January 2020, which elected seven MEPs using the d'Hondt method of party-list proportional representation.

== Geography ==
The parish lies between the Brendon Hills and the River Tone.

Hurstone Farm Woodlands in Waterrow is a woodland on the banks of the River Tone, which has been designated as a local nature reserve. The woodland, hedgerows and open grassland provide a habitat for dormice, otter and several bat species. Bryophyte species include black spleenwort.

== Religious sites ==
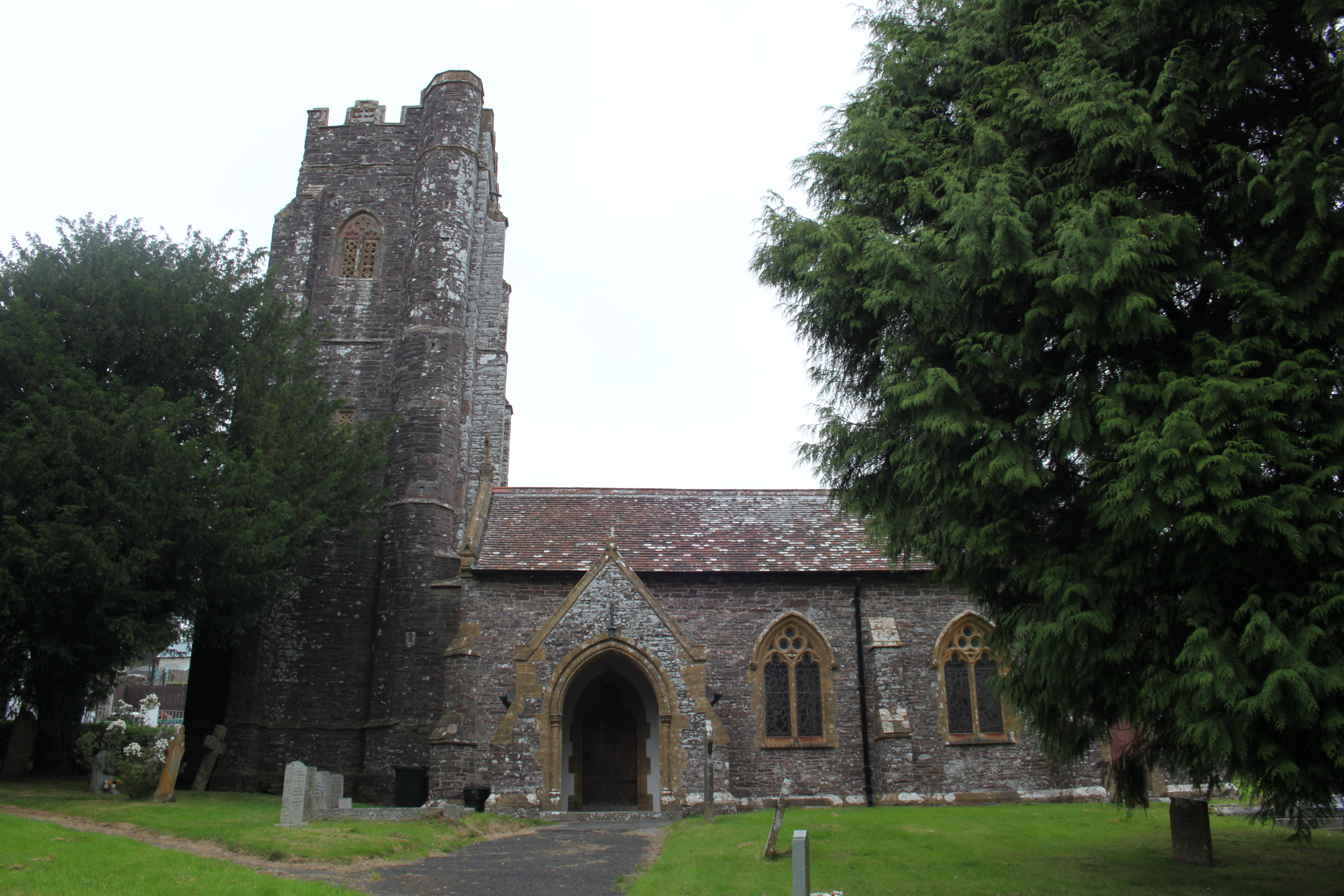
All Saints Church

The Church of England parish Church of St Michael in Raddington dates from the 13th and 14th centuries and has been designated as a grade I listed building.

The Church of All Saints in Chipstable village is more recent having been built in the 15th century. The tower and part of the nave remain from a previous building of about 1239. England cricketer Jos Buttler got married here in October 2017.

Bethel Chapel, was built as a Congregational church in 1890.

Waterrow Church Hall was also built in Waterrow in 1908 for the people of Waterrow to save the journey uphill to Chipstable for services. Waterrow Church Hall now provides local church services for the inhabitants of Waterrow and beyond.
