= Prior's Park & Adcombe Wood =

Biological Site of Special Scientific Interest

- Site of Special Scientific Interest
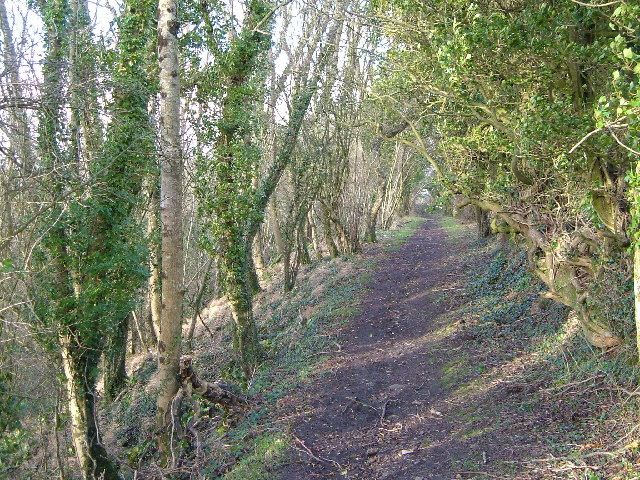

- Location within Somerset
- Location of Prior's Park & Adcombe Wood.
- Area of search: Somerset
- Grid reference: ST225170
- Coordinates: 50.9471°N 3.1026°W
- Interest: Biological
- Area: 103.6 hectares (1.036 km^{2}; 0.400 sq mi)
- Notification date: 1952

Prior's Park & Adcombe Wood (grid reference ST225170) is a 103.6 hectare (256.0 acre) biological Site of Special Scientific Interest south of Pitminster in Somerset, notified in 1952.

Prior's Park and Adcombe Wood have excellent examples of several of the broadleaved semi-natural woodland types associated with the Blackdown Hills. Additional interest lies in the occurrence of several areas of unimproved marshy grassland. This site, which is partly managed by the Somerset Wildlife Trust, is situated on the north facing slopes of the Blackdown Hills, overlooking the Vale of Taunton Deane.
