= St Gregory's Church, Stoke St Gregory =

Church of St Gregory
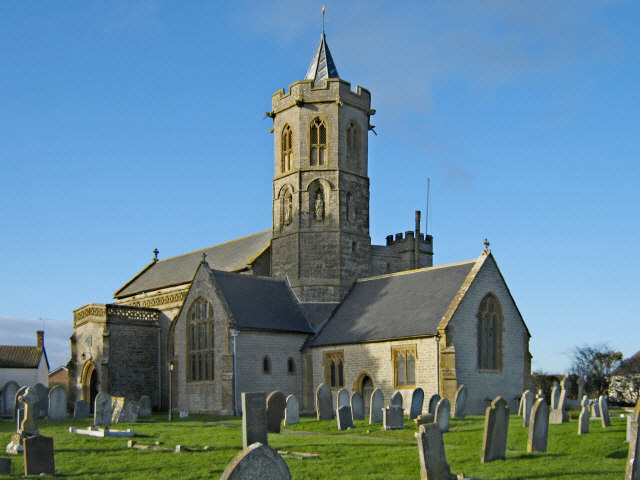

- Location within Somerset
- 51.0400°N 2.9311°W
- Location: Stoke St Gregory
- Country: England
- Denomination: Church of England
- Previous denomination: Roman Catholic
- Churchmanship: Central

History
- Status: Active
- Dedication: St Gregory the Great

Architecture
- Functional status: Parish church
- Heritage designation: Grade I listed
- Designated: 25 February 1955
- Style: Gothic
- Years built: 14th century

Specifications
- Materials: Blue Lias with Hamstone dressings

Administration
- Province: Canterbury
- Diocese: Bath and Wells
- Deanery: Sedgemoor

The Church of St Gregory Stoke St Gregory, is a Church of England parish church in Somerset, England. Its parish is part of the Athelney Benefice, along with the parishes of St Michael, Burrowbridge, St Bartholomew, Lyng and SS Peter and Paul, North Curry.

== History ==
St Gregory's was built in the 14th century, perhaps as early as 1300. It is cruciform, with an octagonal crossing tower whose upper stage was added in the 15th century. The nave has north and south aisles with four-bay arcades. There is a south porch with a sundial over its outer arch and a statue of St Gregory the Great over its inner arch. Fragments of Medieval stained glass survive in the western windows of the aisles.

== Bells ==
The tower has a ring of five bells. John Wiseman of Montacute cast the treble bell in 1628. Thomas I Wroth of Wellington cast the second bell in 1714. John Kingston of Bridgwater cast the third bell in 1818 and the tenor bell in 1823. John Taylor & Co cast the fourth bell in 1909.

== Churchyard ==
St Gregory's churchyard includes a monument that may be 16th-century, one good late-18th-century headstone and a 17th- or 18th-century set of stocks.

== See also ==
- Grade I listed buildings in Taunton Deane
- List of Somerset towers
- List of ecclesiastical parishes in the Diocese of Bath and Wells

== Bibliography ==
- Pevsner, Nikolaus (1958). South and West Somerset. The Buildings of England. Harmondsworth: Penguin Books. pp. 302–303.
