= Walford, Somerset =

Village in Somerset, England

Coordinates: 51.0479°N 3.0400°W

Walford
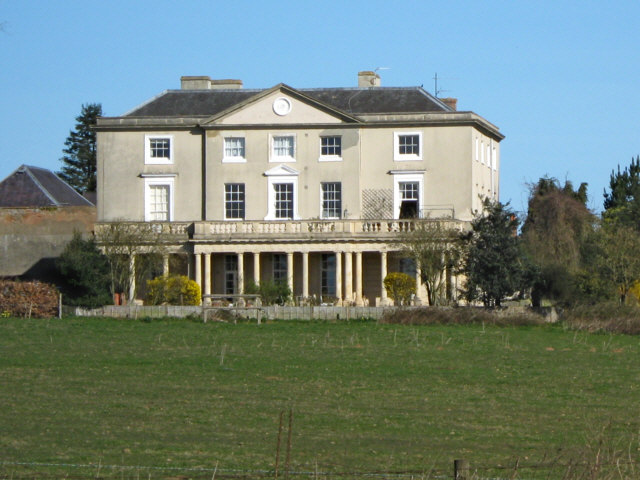
- Walford House

- Location within Somerset
- OS grid reference: ST271281
- Civil parish: Creech St Michael
- Unitary authority: Somerset Council
- Ceremonial county: Somerset
- Region: South West
- Country: England
- Sovereign state: United Kingdom
- Post town: TAUNTON
- Postcode district: TA2
- Dialling code: 01823
- Police: Avon and Somerset
- Fire: Devon and Somerset
- Ambulance: South Western
- UK Parliament: Taunton and Wellington

Walford is a small village 3 miles (5 km) north east of Taunton in Somerset, England. Most of the village, including Walford Cross at the junction of highway A38 and the A361, lies in the civil parish of Creech St Michael. The western part of the village, including Walford House, is in the civil parish of West Monkton. The village lies close to the A38 and the M5 motorway.

The place was first recorded in 682 as Wealaford.

Walford House was built in the late 18th century but in 1985 was converted into flats. It is a Grade II* listed building.

Walford Farm, known as Walford Place until the 18th century, has a cruck roof which dates back to about 1600.
