= St Peter's Church, Staple Fitzpaine =

Church in Somerset, England

Church of St Peter
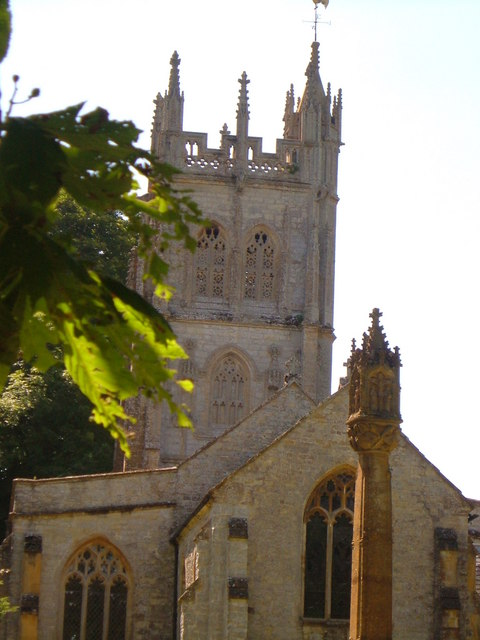

- Location within Somerset

General information
- Location: Staple Fitzpaine, England
- Coordinates: 50.9588°N 3.0496°W
- Completed: 14th century

Church of St Peter, Staple Fitzpaine is Norman in origin, and has been designated as a Grade I listed building.

The church has a Norman doorway reset in the south aisle. The chancel dates from the 14th century. The north aisle was added and the church refenestrated in the 15th century. The tower dates from about 1500, however the south porch and vestry are much more recent, dating from 1841. The crenellated three-stage tower has merlons pierced with trefoil headed arches set on a quatrefoil pierced parapet. On the stonework are hunky punks which show heraldic features.

St Peter's has six bells. The oldest dates from 1480. There are four more original bells. In 1803 one of the bells was made by Thomas Castleman Bilbie of Cullompton, one of the Bilbie family of bell founders and clock makers. There is a long history of bell ringing, (campanology).

== See also ==
- List of Grade I listed buildings in Taunton Deane
- List of towers in Somerset
- List of ecclesiastical parishes in the Diocese of Bath and Wells
