= St Michael's Church, Stawley =

Church in Stawley, UK

Church of St Michael
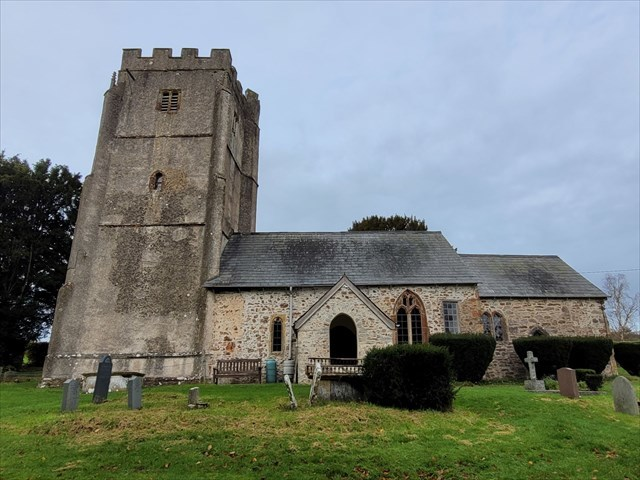

- Location within Somerset

General information
- Location: Stawley, England
- Coordinates: 50.9955°N 3.3404°W
- Completed: 13th century

The Church of St Michael in Stawley, Somerset, England dates from the 13th century and has been designated as a Grade I listed building.

The current church stands on the site of an earlier Norman church from which some herringbone pattern walling survives in the nave.

Much of the current church was built in early 16th century, paid for by local farmer and trader Henry Howe, who is remembered by a scroll over the door. Additional funding, possibly by the family of John Poulett, 1st Baron Poulett, paid for the tower which displays their coat of arms with three swords.

The church register dates from 1528. Despite some minor Victorian restoration in 1873 the church fabric is largely as it would have been in medieval times. In 2007 a sixth bell, which had previously been at the Church of St Peter and St Paul in Maperton, was added to the existing peel in the three-stage west tower.

The Anglican parish which was once part of the benefice of Wellington and district within the archdeadconry of Taunton, is now part of the newley formed benefice of West Tone.

== See also ==
- List of Grade I listed buildings in Taunton Deane
- List of towers in Somerset
- List of ecclesiastical parishes in the Diocese of Bath and Wells
