= Poundisford Park =

Manor house in Pitminster, Somerset, England

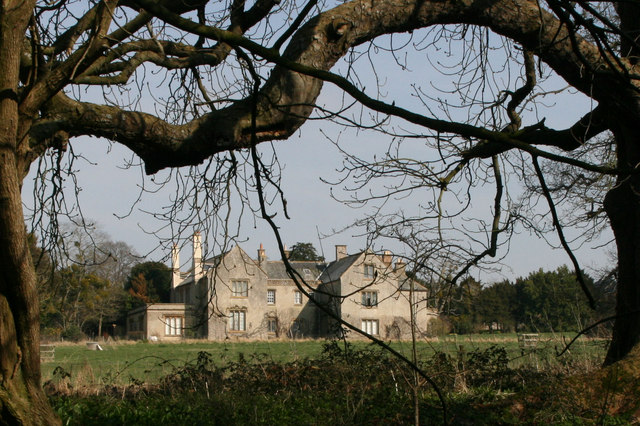
- Poundisford Lodge

- Location within Somerset

General information
- Location: Pitminster, England
- Coordinates: 50.9760°N 3.1081°W
- Construction started: 1546
- Completed: c1550
- Client: William Hill

Poundisford Park north of Pitminster, Somerset, England is an English country house that typifies progressive housebuilding on the part of the West Country gentry in the mid-16th century. The main house was built for William Hill around 1550 and has been designated as a Grade I listed building.

In addition to several buildings the park contains formal gardens which were originally laid out in the 17th century set within a medieval deer park.

== History ==
Poundisford was an appendage of the episcopal Taunton Deane estate, belonging to the Bishop of Winchester. The enclosure of the park is variously attributed to Bishop Henry de Blois (died 1171) or Bishop Peter des Roches (died 1238).

In 1534 the park was divided into two by Bishop Stephen Gardiner. The northern section of the park, including the original lodge, was leased to Roger Hill, whose son rebuilt the lodge. The southern area, as yet without a house, was leased to John Soper, who sold it to Hill's son, William, who built the present Poundisford Park shortly after his return to England. The entrance front is an outstanding example of the approach towards symmetry of the English country house from its former expression of the hierarchy of its interior spaces. At Poundisford the great hall rises in the traditional way through two storeys and occupies its traditional place in the central bar of the H-plan. Its entrance porch rises through the facade to a gable that is matched on the opposite side with an oriel similarly rising through both floors to a matching gable. A central gable in the recessed central bay reinforces the symmetry of the entrance front.

The two linked properties were passed down in the Hill family until the late 17th century, when the Lodge passed out of the family by marriage.

In 1673 the Park was inherited by Sir Roger Hill, who already owned Denham Place in Buckinghamshire. In 1704 he sold the Park to Dr Simon Welman, a retired physician who died in 1708, although before he died Welman also bought the Lodge, reuniting the two parts of the estate. When Welman died the Park passed to his elder son, Simon, and the Lodge to his younger son, Thomas. The park was held by Simon Welman's descendants until 1869, when it was sold to the Helyers who owned the Lodge, once again reuniting the two parts. The combined estate then remained intact until 1928, when the Park was sold to Arthur Vivian-Neal. Vivian-Neal, a JP and alderman, and a keen antiquarian and archaeologist, paid £10,000 for the estate in 1928 and spent even more repairing and modernising the property, employing Anthony Methuen as the architect. The Vivian-Neals lived at Poundisford until 1994, when it was offered for sale at £600,000.

== Poundisford Park ==
The three-storey house was extended with a dining room added to the northeast of the original house in 1692. In 1717 a stable, coach house and barn were added, with the service wing to the southeast of the main block being added between 1717 and 1823. The house is approximately H-shaped with entrances placed to the north and south. The design of the house was influenced by Barrington Court, often dated 1514, Nicholas Cooper suggests that it actually postdates Poundisford by a few years.

== Poundisford Lodge ==
The Lodge, which predates the Park, is around 550 metres (1,804.5 ft) north of the main house. The two-storey building is U-shaped, with the hall range extending from north to south and lateral wings extending to the north-west and south-west.

The lodge contains two fine late 16th century plasterwork barrel vaulted bedrooms and extensive decorative wainscoting. It has been designated a Grade II* listed building.

== Grounds ==
The total site covers around 180 hectares (444.8 acres) including 2 hectares (4.9 acres) of gardens and pleasure grounds, and 178 hectares (440 acres) which were enclosed within the medieval park pale, which formed an elliptical shape, of which 40 hectares (99 acres) remains as parkland today. The park pale was a barrier to contain deer made of an earthen bank from 4 metres (13.1 ft) to 7 metres (23.0 ft) wide and up to 2 metres (6.6 ft) high. They have been designated Grade II on the Historic England National Register of Historic Parks and Gardens.

The Poundisford Park Pale, which has been designated as an Ancient monument is included on the Heritage at Risk Register due to scrub and tree growth.

== See also ==
- List of Grade I listed buildings in Taunton Deane
