= Cothay Manor =

Grade I listed historic house museum in Stawley, United Kingdom

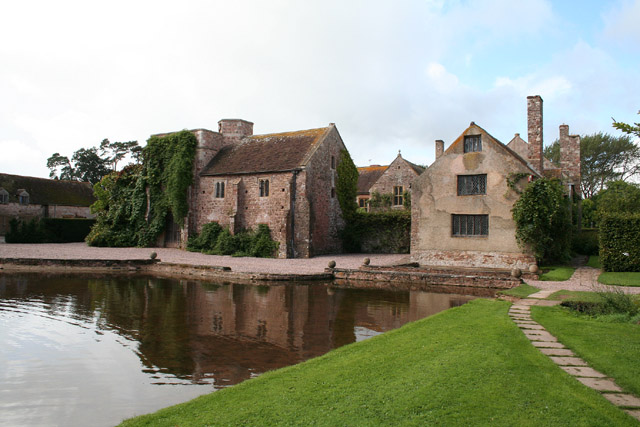

- Location within Somerset

General information
- Architectural style: Medieval
- Location: Stawley, near Wellington, England
- Coordinates: 50.9837°N 3.3048°W
- Completed: c1480

Cothay Manor is a grade one listed medieval house and gardens, in Stawley, near Wellington, Somerset. The manor grounds consist of almost 40 acres and include cottages, outbuildings, stables, and 12 acres of gardens.

The manor is Grade I listed on the National Heritage List for England, and its gate piers and wall to the north entrance of the house are listed Grade II.

In the early 14th century the lord of the manor was the de Cothay family, whose heir was the Bluett family, later from the early 15th century lords of the manor of Holcombe Rogus in Devon, also of nearby Greenham Barton.

Built around 1480, its listing cites it as an unusually well-conserved, neat collection of buildings before 1500 in England. The rent for the land surrounding the manor in the medieval era was a pair of silver spurs and a rose. To celebrate the end of the Cousins' Wars, in the Tudor rose iconography of the time, a red rose (for Lancashire), and a white rose (for Yorkshire), were planted on the terrace by Richard Bluett, who was the lord of the manor at the time.

In 1927, historian Christopher Hussey wrote in Country Life that this manor house was "the most perfect small 15th‐century country house that survives in the Kingdom".

== Recent history ==
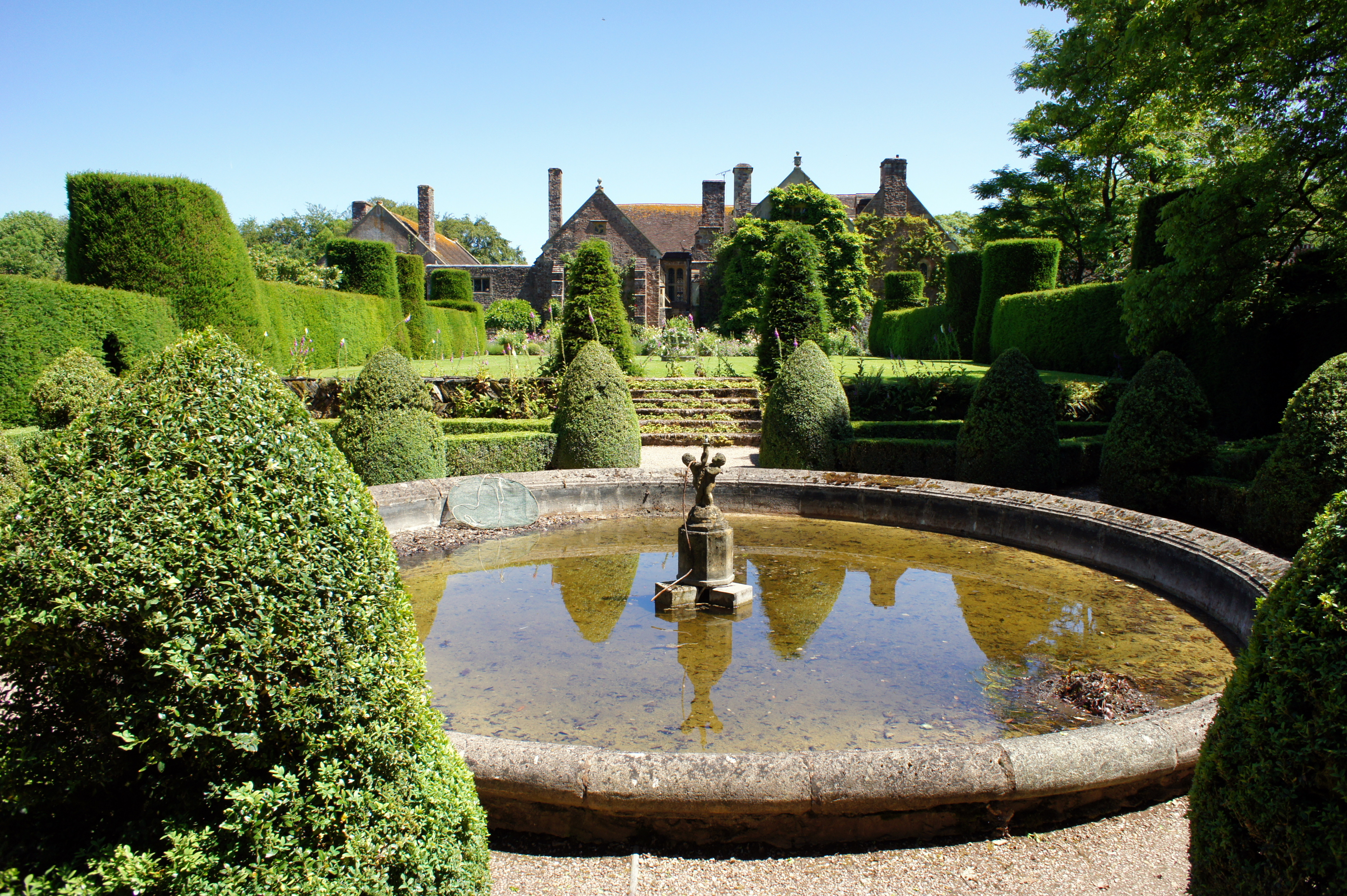
Cothay Manor

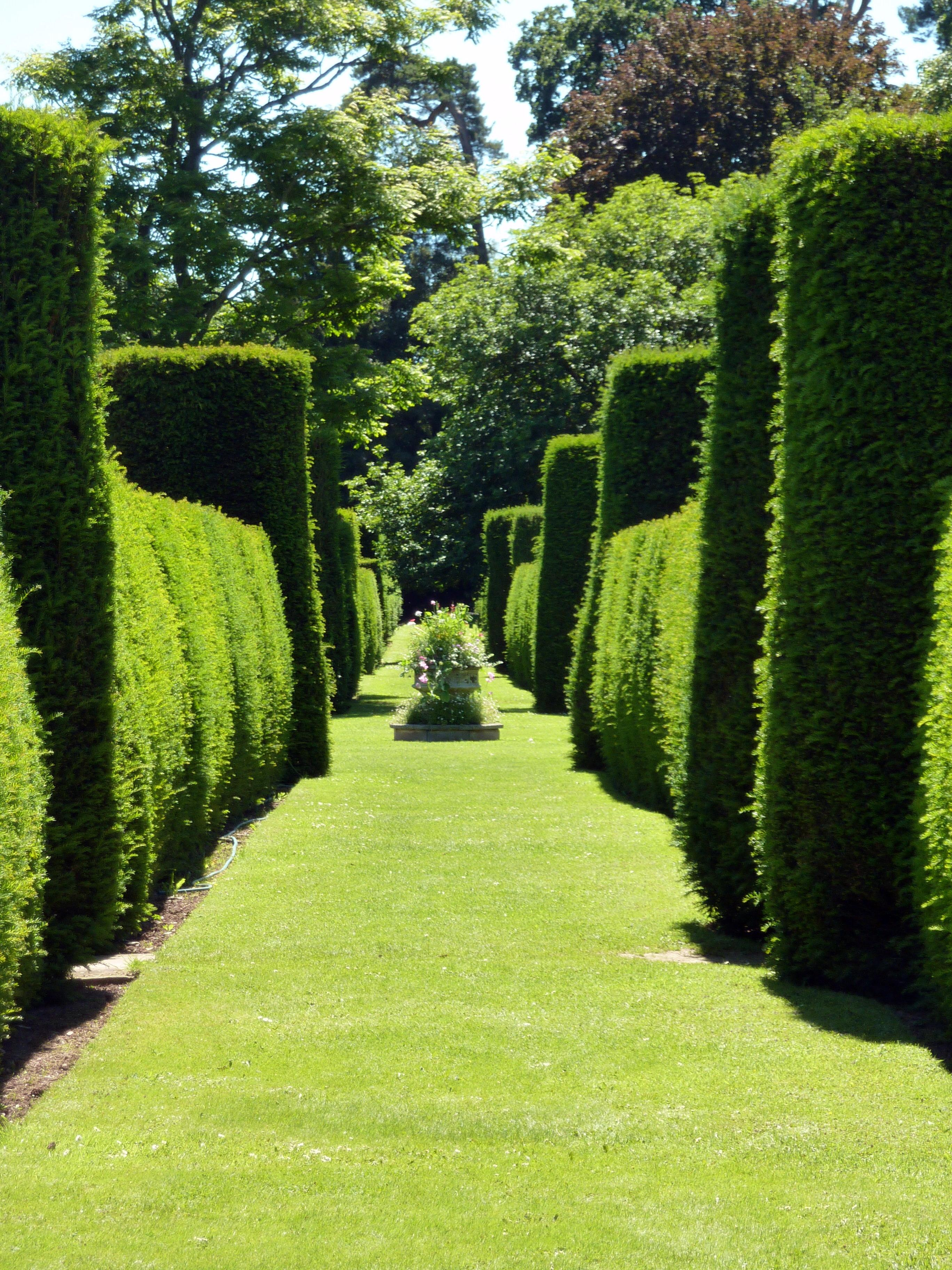
The Yew Walk is a 600 feet long narrow grass walk between tall yew hedges with openings to lawns, herbaceous borders, and other garden rooms including the Walk of the Unicorn.

In 1925 the property was purchased by Lt-Col Reginald Cooper, who was the oldest friend of Sir Harold Nicolson, having been his contemporary at Wellington College and a colleague in the Diplomatic Corps. Nicholson was the owner of Sissinghurst Castle Garden, and both were friends of Hidcote Manor Garden's Major Lawrence Johnston and Edwin Lutyens. Cooper arranged for restoration of the gatehouse and the house in a "sympathetic" manner, to retain the medieval look and feel.

Nicholson's diaries indicate that the gardeners exchanged ideas, and that "Reggie came to stay and advised me on the length of the bowling green". Cooper's larger projects included moving the River Tone to save his favourite pine trees from erosion. Sissinghurst was laid out in 1932, with one garden writer describing Cothay as the "Sissinghurst of the West Country".

From 1937 to 1947 the property was owned by Sir Francis Cook, 4th Baronet and housed much of his famous art collection during World War II although it was dispersed after the war.

In 1947 the house and gardens were bought by Vera Astley-Rushton, widow of Vice Admiral Edward Astley-Rushton. In the 1960s, Vera and her daughter Penelope opened the house and gardens to the public, publishing a short history in 1970. They re-established Catholic worship at Cothay, being the first Catholics to live there since the Bluett family.

The first Catholic Mass since the reformation was celebrated there by Archbishop Thomas Roberts S.J. in 1953. They also farmed, using organic principles, keeping a herd of Jersey cows. They sold in 1972.

Subsequently, the property was the home of Taunton MP Edward du Cann who sold the property to Alastair and Mary-Anne Robb in 1993. Alastair's great-grandmother Mary-Anne was a plant hunter, with the Wood Spurge Euphorbia amygdaloides 'var. robbiae' named after her, nicknamed "Mrs Robb's Bonnet" because she had to hide it in her hat to smuggle it through customs. With the whole property and gardens in need of renovation, the gardens were gutted and rebuilt along the original Cooper structure. The Robbs also added new garden areas, including a bog garden in the Oxbow, an Arboretum planted, and a wild flower meadow sown.

In the 2003 book "England’s Thousand Best Houses", Simon Jenkins awarded Cothay four out of five stars "for its authentic medieval interiors ‘of incomparable value’".

In 2008 and 2009, the manor was the subject of a Channel 4 television programme presented by hotelier Ruth Watson as part of her Country House Rescue series. In the first episode, the owners expressed concern about the cost of operating the manor and the £1 million tax bill. Watson provided some advice on increasing the revenue from visitors to the manor and gardens by increasing the commercial appeal. In an interview in August 2011, the Robbs said they had accepted some of Watson's advice as they had discussed in the "revisited" episode (which aired in November 2009) but had also implemented some new concepts of their own with a "little bit more soul, spirit and meaning". After Alastair Robb died in December 2015, the family retained ownership of the property.

The book, "The English Country House Garden: Traditional Retreats to Contemporary Masterpieces" by George Plumptre, provided an extensive overview of the manor's history and of the gardens and arboretum as they appeared in 2013.

In 2018, the manor served as a film set for the Robert Downey Jr. film Dolittle (2020) about a doctor who can converse with animals.

In June 2020, Country Life magazine published the latest specifics about the manor with its "medieval rooms [including] the vaulted Great Hall and Great Chamber, the Winter Parlour, the Gold Room, the Guest Chamber and the exquisite Oratory, a tiny chapel over the porch." The report also provided this summary of the full property:

The manor itself comprises a 16,700sq ft complex of residential buildings surrounding its medieval core — the Robb family’s private domain — with outlying elements, including the north wing, the studio annexe, the coach house, its adjoining cottage and a one-bedroom first-floor flat, currently let on assured shorthold tenancies.

In early June 2020, the property was listed for sale at £5 million, and sold in October 2020 to its new owners for £5.25M.

== See also ==
- List of country houses in the United Kingdom
