= River Tone =

River in Somerset, England

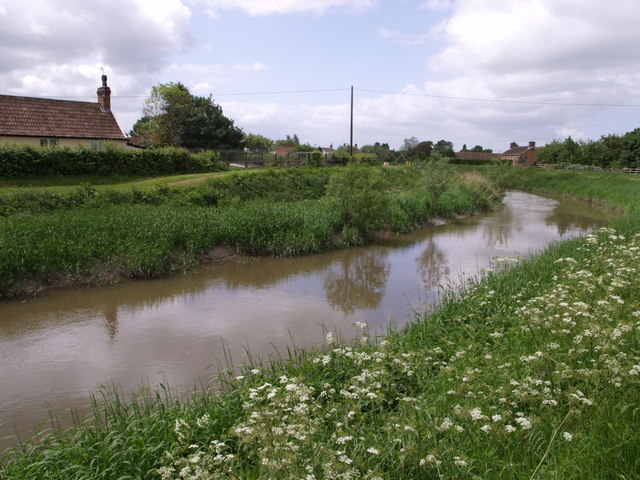
- The River Tone near Burrowbridge

Location
- Country: England
- County: Somerset
- Settlements: Taunton, Creech St Michael

Physical characteristics
- Source: Brendon Hills
  - location: Huish Champflower, West Somerset, Somerset, England
  - coordinates: 51°06′05″N 3°24′29″W
- Mouth: River Parrett
  - location: Burrowbridge, Taunton Deane, Somerset, England
  - coordinates: 51°04′02″N 2°55′02″W
- Length: 33 km (21 mi)
- Basin size: 414 km^{2} (160 sq mi)
- Discharge
  - location: Bishops Hull
  - average: 3.02 m^{3}/s (107 cu ft/s)

River Tone Navigation Act 1698
- Act of Parliament
- Parliament of England
- Long title: An Act for makeing and keeping the River Tone navigable from Bridgwater to Taunton in the County of Somersett.
- Citation: 10 Will. 3. c. 8 (Note: This is the citation in The Statutes of the Realm.); 10 & 11 Will. 3. c. 8 (Note: This is the citation in The Statutes at Large.)
- Territorial extent: England and Wales

Dates
- Royal assent: 24 March 1699
- Commencement: 6 December 1698 (Note: Start of session.)

Status: Current legislation

Text of statute as originally enacted

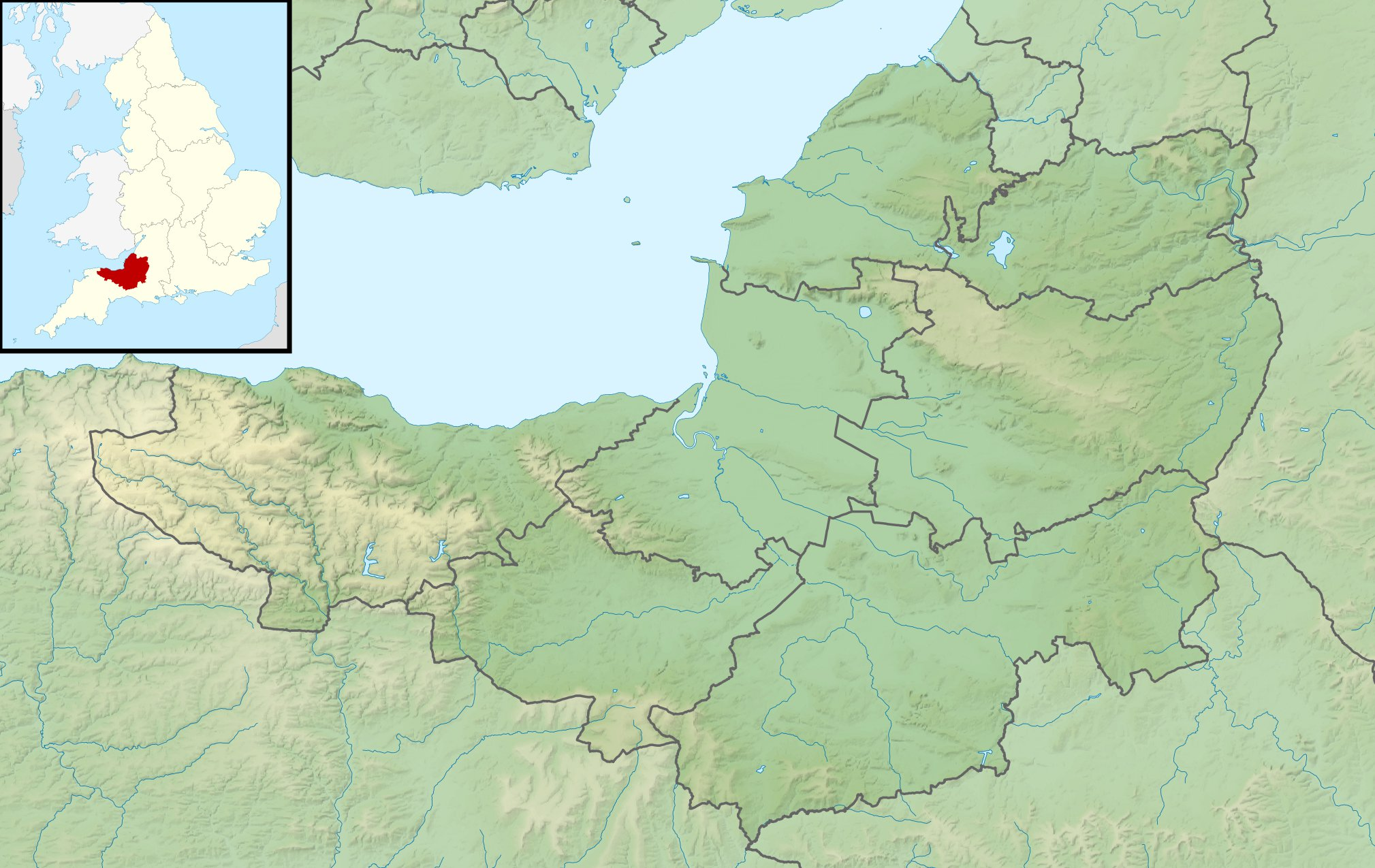
Map of Somerset — showing the source and mouth of the Tone

The River Tone is a river in the English county of Somerset. The river is about 33 kilometres (21 mi) long. Its source is at Beverton Pond near Huish Champflower in the Brendon Hills, and is dammed at Clatworthy Reservoir. The reservoir outfall continues through Taunton and Curry and Hay Moors, which are designated as a Site of Special Scientific Interest. Finally, it flows into the River Parrett at Burrowbridge.

The River Tone Navigation Act 1698 (10 Will. 3. c. 8) was an act of the Parliament of England, passed in 1699 to authorise work that made the river navigable as far as Taunton. The act specified that profits should be used to benefit the poor of Taunton, but the proprietors succeeded in avoiding their obligation until 1843, when they used the proceeds from the sale of the navigation to fund a wing of the Taunton and Somerset Hospital, and to aid the Taunton Market Trust.

The Bridgwater and Taunton Canal opened in 1827, which provided an easier route than the river, and protracted legal battles followed over ownership of the river and water rights for the canal. These were not finally resolved until 1832, when the canal company formally took over the river navigation. The ability to navigate the river gradually deteriorated, not helped by the abandonment of the River Parrett as a navigation in 1878. Following flooding in Taunton in 1960, much of the river between there and its mouth was straightened, and the navigation locks were removed. That at Ham was blown up by the Territorial Army. Navigation rights were repealed in 1967.

== Course ==
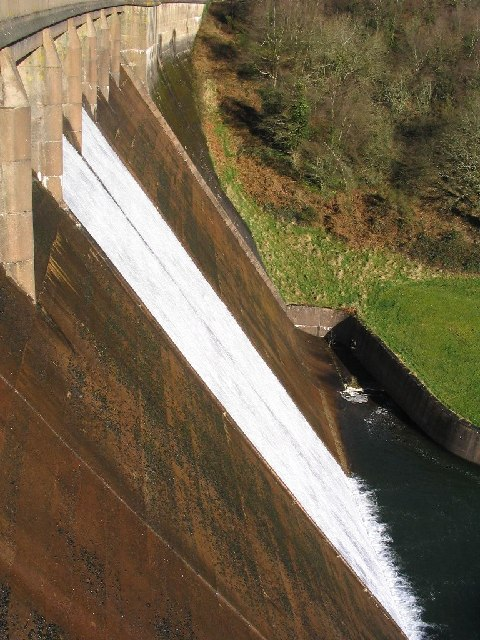
Clatworthy Dam

The river is about 33 kilometres (21 mi) long. Its source is at Beverton Pond. Over its first 1.8 miles (2.9 km) it follows a south-easterly course and drops around 490 feet (150 m) before discharging into Clatworthy Reservoir, which also impounds the waters of 5 other streams.

The river continues as the outflow from the main dam of the reservoir, passing to the west of the village of Clatworthy before following a southerly course which passes to the east of Huish Champflower. The river enters a steeply wooded section at Washbattle bridge. The B3227 road from Wiveliscombe crosses from the east to the west side of the valley at Waterrow bridge. By the time it reaches Stawley bridge and turns south-east, it has lost another 410 ft (120 m) and is just 330 ft (100 m) above sea level. At Greenham, the river turns to run generally north-east. The river passes to the north of Wellington, and a mile further on the course of the derelict Grand Western Canal crosses the Tone on an aqueduct which now carries a footpath.

The river passes over weirs at Greenham, Tone and Nynehead, after which it is crossed by the Bristol and Exeter Railway. A disused bridge, constructed in 1817, spans the river at Nynehead. The river turns to the north-east near Bradford on Tone, with its two listed bridges, including the Bradford Bridge which was originally built by the 15th century, and then to the east near Upcott bridge, where there were two mills. At Roughmoor its course is crossed by Silk Mills Road. There is a scheme to make the river navigable from here to the town centre as a way of encouraging transport with less environmental impact.

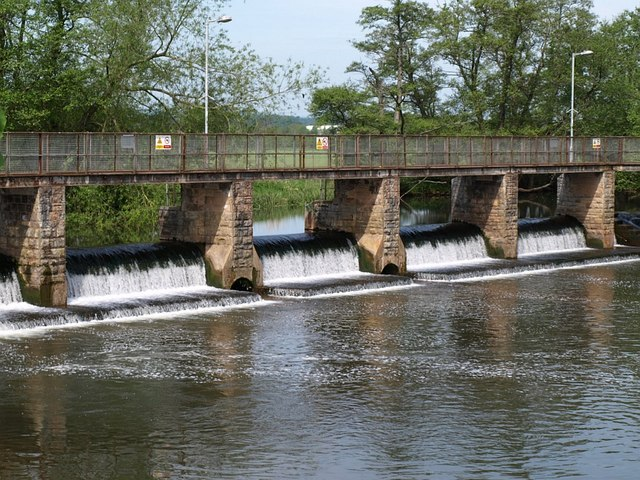
A footbridge crosses the top of French Weir at Taunton

The French weir in Taunton is the head of navigation as boats can not be taken upstream of this point. As it makes its way through the town centre to Firepool weir and the junction with the Bridgwater and Taunton Canal, it passes under the North Bridge, which was constructed in 1895, and Priory Bridge Road. Firepool weir was reconstructed in 1967 as part of the plans to straighten the river through the town centre and down to Bathpool in order to provide better flood defences. These works swept away the remains of the original navigation. Firepool Pumping Station was built the 1840s, on the site of medieval lime kilns, and later adapted for use as a pumping station supplying water to the steam trains of the Bristol and Exeter Railway.

The Brewhouse Theatre & Arts Centre, is close to the riverside., as is the County Ground, home of Somerset County Cricket Club. Next comes the A358 Obridge viaduct, the A38 Bathpool Bridge and the M5 motorway bridge. There is a disused five-arched railway bridge built in 1863 at Creech St Michael. Nearby is the aqueduct that carried the Chard Canal over the river from 1842 until 1866. Ham weir stands as a reminder of the location of the lock there. After Knapp bridge, the sluice at Newbridge marks the upper tidal limit of the river. Curry and Hay Moors, an area of low-lying fenland close to the river, are a Site of Special Scientific Interest. A railway bridge carries the Taunton to Castle Cary railway line over the river, after which is the Curry Moor pumping station. Two more road bridges at Athelney and Stanmoor cross the river before it joins the River Parrett at Burrowbridge, where the junction is overshadowed by Burrow Mump.

== Geography and geology ==
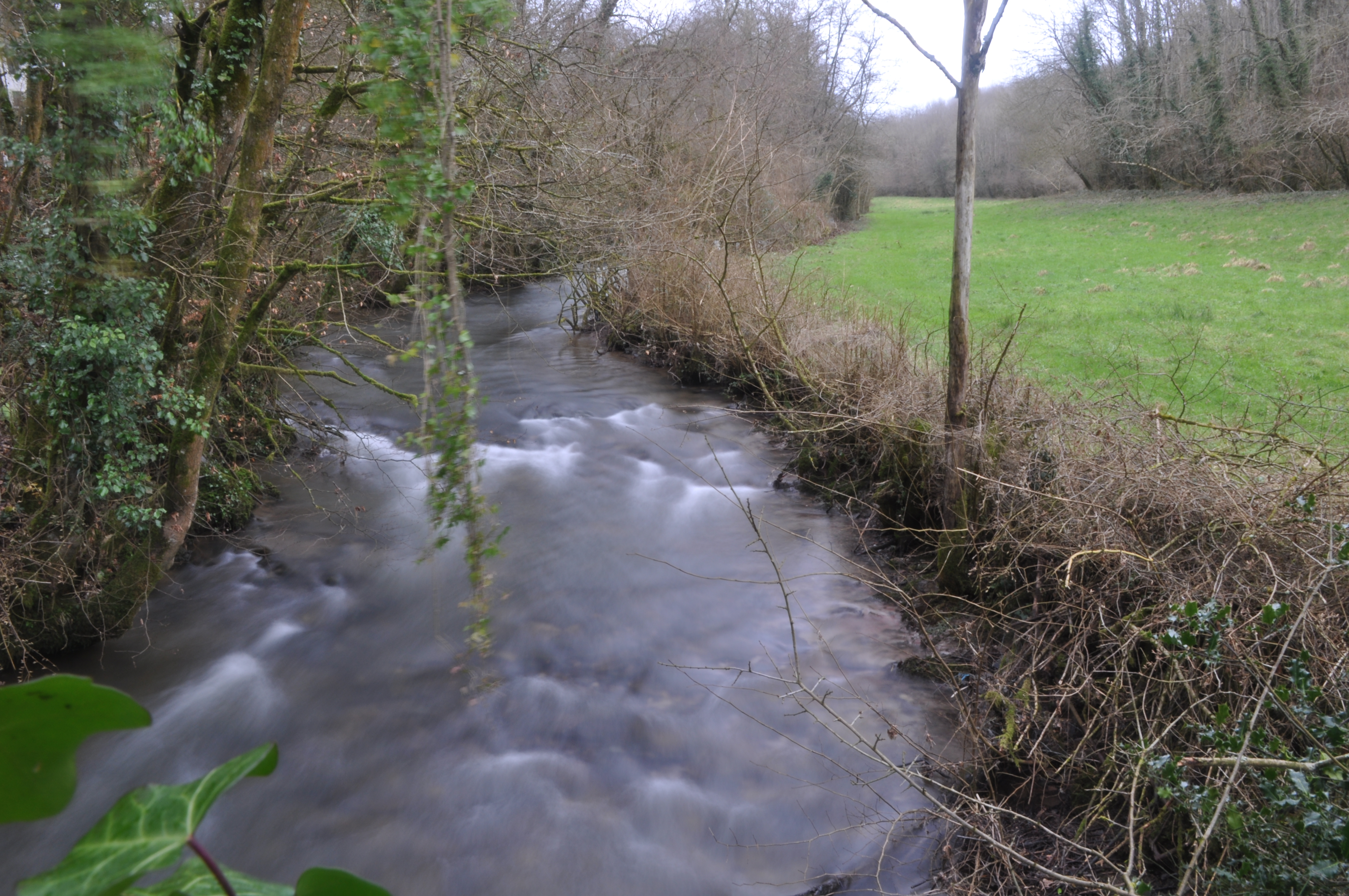
The River Tone at Tracebridge

The catchment area of the river is approximately 414 square kilometres (160 sq mi) and the average daily flow for the entire catchment is estimated to be 4.76 cubic metres per second (168 cu ft/s). Water from tributaries such as Hillfarrance Brook, Halse Water, Haywards Water, Three Bridges Stream, Sherford Stream and Broughton Brook feed the river but are supplemented by controlled releases from Clatworthy and Luxhay Reservoirs during dry periods. The tributaries flowing into the Tone from the south bring water from the Blackdown Hills.

The rivers source is in the Brendon Hills which fall within the Exmoor National Park. The hills are quite heavily cultivated unlike their neighbouring upland areas of Exmoor and the Quantock Hills. The Brendon Hills are largely formed from the Morte Slates, a thick faulted and folded sequence of Devonian age sedimentary rocks. It then flows through an alluvial floodplain underlain by sub-alluvial gravels, underlain by rocks of the Mercia Mudstone Group. The floodplain is between 5 metres (16 ft) and 50 metres (160 ft) above the ordnance datum (mean sea level). The surrounding land is dominated by wet meadow and wooded areas including willow trees.

Water quality in the river can be affected by dredging work.

== Hydrology and water quality ==
The Environment Agency is responsible for monitoring water quality on the river and its tributaries, which have been divided into seventeen separate water bodies. In 2013, seven water bodies were assessed as having good quality and ten as being moderate. The reasons for not achieving good status included pollution from waste water, pollution from agriculture and physical modifications. The physical modifications include dredging work on the lower reaches, near the junction with the Parrett to increase the channel flow to reduce flooding. The use and storage of the dredged material in bank restoration may also have an impact. In 1998 improvements were sought to treatment works and surface water outfalls to improve water quality. A vegetable washing plant on the Chelston stream at Wellington was also identified as a source of pollution. The waters of the Upper Tone have been classified as having good ecological status, whereas the section from Wellington to Taunton and downstream of Taunton are rated as moderate.

Water quality of the River Tone in 2019:

Section	Ecological Status	Chemical Status	Length	Catchment	Channel
Tone - Upper	Good	Fail	27.528 km (17.105 mi)	82.623 km^{2} (31.901 sq mi)	
Tone - Wellington to Taunton	Moderate	Fail	12.685 km (7.882 mi)	20.954 km^{2} (8.090 sq mi)	
Tone Ds Taunton	Moderate	Fail	14.424 km (8.963 mi)	42.97 km^{2} (16.59 sq mi)	Heavily modified

Like most rivers in the UK, the chemical status changed from good to fail in 2019, due to the presence of polybrominated diphenyl ethers (PBDE), perfluorooctane sulphonate (PFOS) and mercury compounds, none of which had previously been included in the assessment.

There are three monitoring stations on the river tracking the water levels. At Greenham the normal level of the river in average weather conditions is between 0.15 metres (5.9 in) and 0.50 metres (1 ft 8 in) with the highest recorded being 2.2 metres (7 ft 3 in) on 7 December 2000. At Bishops Hull the normal range is 0.09 metres (3.5 in) to 0.54 metres (1 ft 9 in) and the high 2.59 metres (8 ft 6 in) on 30 October 2000. At Taunton market the normal range is 0.88 metres (2 ft 11 in) to 0.93 metres (3 ft 1 in) with a high of 2.77 metres (9 ft 1 in) on 24 December 2013.

The flow in two tributaries and two points on the river is also monitored, primarily to act as an early flood warning system for Taunton. On Halsewater the mean flow is 1.128 cubic metres per second (39.8 cu ft/s) while at Milverton on the Hillfarrance Brook it is 0.53 cubic metres per second (19 cu ft/s) and at Greenham on the river itself it is 1.025 cubic metres per second (36.2 cu ft/s). At Clatworthy Reservoir near the source the flow rate is 0.322 cubic metres per second (11.4 cu ft/s).

== History ==
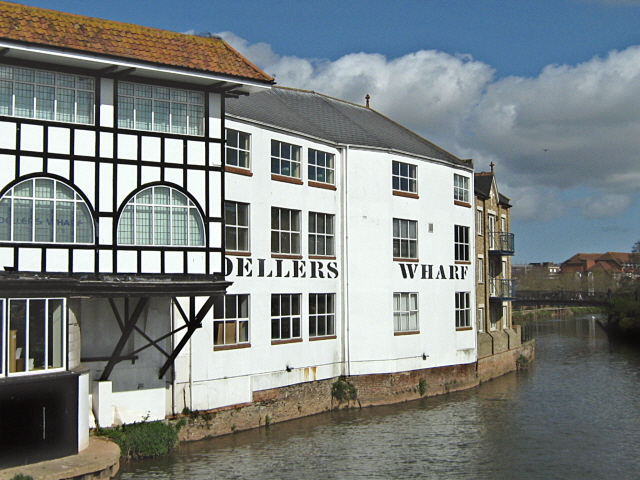
Dellers Wharf at Taunton.

The river has a long history of improvements to facilitate navigation from Bridgwater to Taunton, and has also been used to power mills along its length. These two objectives are often antagonistic, and this has been the case on the River Tone.

The earliest known record of improvements to the river is recorded in a document of 1325 from the Dean and Chapter of Wells Cathedral, where it was proposed to widen the river between Ham Mill and a new mill which was to be built at Knapp. The Dean and Chapter owned the river as far as Athelney weir, which was presumably a fish weir, as the river was an important source of fish for the local population. Records from 1494 record the intent to build a new mill at North Curry, which was operational in 1504, and caused flooding in 1505, resulting in the Bishop of Winchester having to complain to the Dean and Chapter of Wells. There is also mention of boats using the river at this time, as their use was restricted by the construction of the new mill at Ham.

=== River improvements ===
Navigation on the first 7 miles (11 km) from Burrowbridge to Ham Mill was much easier than on the final stretch to Taunton, and in 1638, John Mallett, the Sheriff of Somerset and member of parliament for Bath, obtained a Commission under the Great Seal from King Charles II. This granted him and his heirs sole navigation rights from Bridgwater to Ham Mills, and allowed him to improve the river at his own expense. He saw this as a philanthropic action, as it reduced the price of coal to the poor people of Taunton, as well as improving the transport infrastructure.

With the death of Mallett and later his son, work on the maintenance of the river ceased, and its condition declined. By 1697, trade was threatened, and a group of 34 merchants and traders petitioned parliament for powers to take over the navigation. The River Tone Navigation Act 1698 (10 Will. 3. c. 8), dated 24 March 1699, created the Conservators of the River Tone, giving them powers "for making and keeping the River Tone navigable from Bridgewater to Taunton, in the county of Somerset", which included the purchase of the navigation rights from Bridgwater to Ham Mills from the Mallett estate, for which a price of £330 was agreed.

River Tone Improvement Act 1707
- Act of Parliament
- Parliament of Great Britain
- Long title: An Act for the more effectual making and keeping the River Tone navigable, from Bridgewater to Taunton, in the County of Somerset.
- Citation: 6 Ann. c. 70; 6 Ann. c 9 Pr. (Note: This is the citation in The Statutes at Large.)
- Territorial extent: Great Britain

Dates
- Royal assent: 11 March 1708
- Commencement: 23 October 1707 (Note: Start of session.)
Other legislation
Amended by	River Tone Navigation Act 1804

Status: Amended

Text of statute as originally enacted

The conservators applied for a second act of parliament, the River Tone Improvement Act 1707 (6 Ann. c. 70), as they needed a further £3,800 to finance projects including the building of a half-lock and the removal of a shoal just below Knapp Bridge. Boats carrying 15 tons of cargo could reach Taunton by 1717. The navigation included a lock and two or more half-locks, consisting of a pair of gates to hold back the water, and an agreement to build a towpath between Ham Mills and Taunton was reached in 1724.

The number of locks on the navigation varied over the years, and by 1804 there were four full or pound locks, situated at Ham, Creech St Michael, Bathpool and Obridge. In addition, there were at least four half locks. Curry Moor gates were the lowest on the river, which were followed by a second half lock 100 yards (91 m) further upstream, just below Newbridge. A third gate was located 450 yards (410 m) below Ham lock, and the fourth one was just below the lock at Bathpool.

=== Profits ===
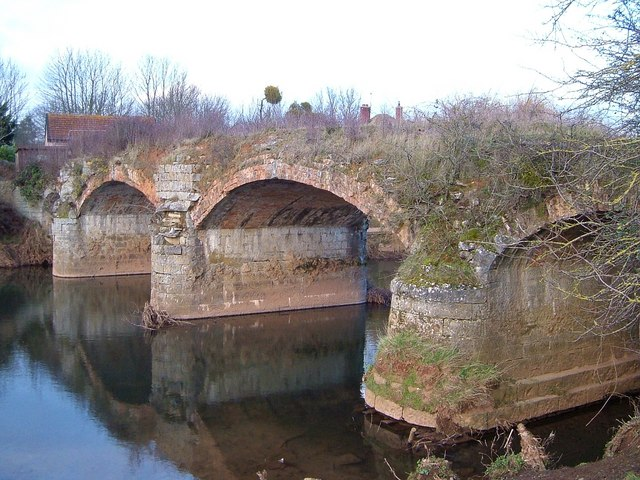
The Aqueduct over the river near Creech St Michael

The 1699 act of parliament had stipulated that the Conservators could receive dividends of six per cent on the money they had invested into the undertaking, until the capital was repaid, and that after that the tolls were to be reduced, while profits were to be used for "the benefit and advantage of the poor of Taunton", particularly by the building of hospitals. Local landowners complained about rights of access across their land and increased flooding in a petition of 1707, however in 1708 another act was passed to allow the completion of the navigation to Taunton.

Because the receipts were initially insufficient to cover the six per cent dividend on the £5,697 that the Conservators had invested, they added the difference to the capital, so that the debt steadily increased. This state of affairs was challenged in 1735, when it was decreed that the original capital had been repaid, and the poor should now benefit, but the decision was overturned in 1738 on appeal.

River Tone Navigation Act 1804
- Act of Parliament
- Parliament of the United Kingdom
- Long title: An Act for explaining and amending two acts, passed in the tenth and eleventh years of King William the Third, and the sixth year of Queen Anne, for making and keeping navigable the river Tone, from Bridgewater to Taunton, in the county of Somerset.
- Citation: 44 Geo. 3. c. lxxxiii
- Territorial extent: United Kingdom

Dates
- Royal assent: 14 July 1804
- Commencement: 14 July 1804 (Note: Section 1.)
Other legislation
Amends	River Tone Navigation Act 1698; River Tone Improvement Act 1707

Status: Current legislation

Text of statute as originally enacted

Profits for the undertaking showed a steady rise, due in part to the low maintenance costs of the river. Income from tolls rose from £321 in 1712 to £1,137 by 1802. By this time, traffic consisted of about 11,500 tons of coal carried from Bridgwater upstream out of a total tonnage of 14,000 tons. Dividends for 1797 were 11.5%, but the capital debt had risen to £85,466 by 1800, when the auditors refused to examine the accounts, because the likelihood of the poor ever benefitting from the navigation was receding. After much negotiation, the capital debt was reduced to £13,000. The River Tone Navigation Act 1804 (44 Geo. 3. c. lxxxiii) enshrined this position, and ensured that interest was limited to six percent, with profits being used to reduce the debt. By 1828, the amount owing had reduced to £4,426.

=== Canal Company Takeover ===
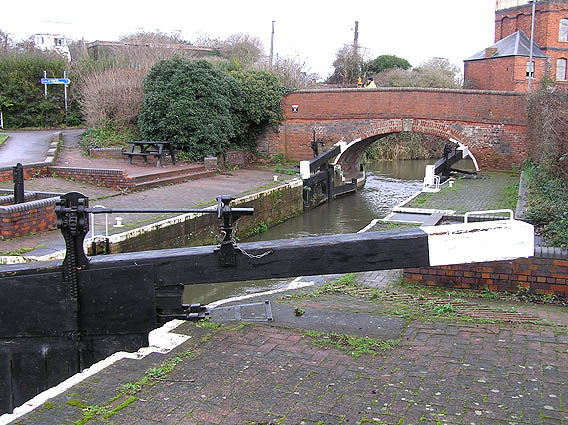
Firepool lock where the Bridgwater and Taunton Canal meets the River Tone

The building of the Bridgwater and Taunton Canal, which opened in 1827, directly affected the River Tone Navigation, as it provided a more direct route between Taunton and Bridgwater. The Conservators attempted to limit the supply of water from the river to the canal, while the canal company breached the river bank near Firepool lock, in order to ensure that boats could reach Taunton Bridge wharf from the canal. In order to compete with the canal, they chose to reduce the tolls, although they were unsure of the legality of this action while they had outstanding debts. The canal company challenged their right to reduce the tolls in court, but the action was defeated, and the tolls remained at the lower level.

On 28 August 1827, the canal company announced that they were taking over the River Tone Navigation, under the terms of their acts of parliament of 1811 and 1824. This they did in November, when William Goodland, the river superintendent, was evicted from his cottage, the tolls were raised again, and maintenance ceased. This action was ruled to be illegal by the Court of King's Bench, as the canal company had not complied with the time limits enshrined in the act, but the canal company held on to the river despite the order to give it back to the conservators. Both sides took their case to the High Court, which ruled that the Conservators should have the river in February 1830. A further series of legal actions followed, after which the canal company attempted to obtain a new act of parliament to obtain the Tone by compulsory purchase. The Conservators then decided to negotiate, and an act of parliament passed in July 1832 authorised the takeover.

Under the terms of the act, the canal company inherited the debts of the Conservators, and paid them an additional £2,000. They were required to rebuild part of the North Town Bridge in Taunton, and to return the Tone Navigation to good order. The Conservators were empowered to carry out an annual inspection, and to re-possess the river if the canal was not properly maintained. The £2,000 was held by the Conservators until 1838, when they applied for an order to dispose of it, but it was not until 1843 that the order was granted. £1,000 was used to build a new wing for the Taunton and Somerset Hospital, and £1,000 was invested in the Taunton Market Trust, in line with the intentions of the 1699 act.

=== Decline ===
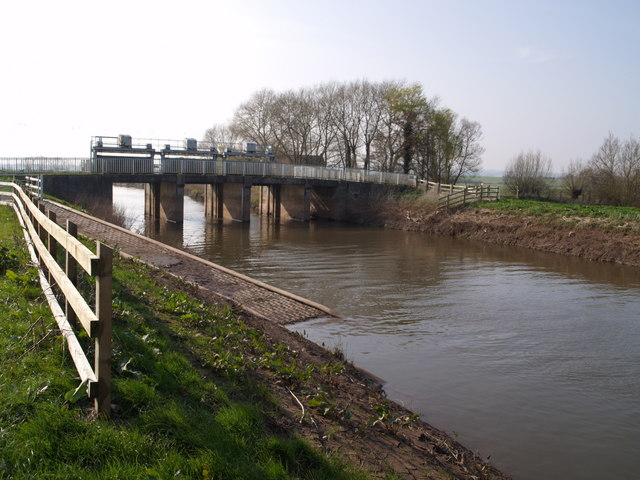
The sluice at Newbridge, which is the tidal limit for the river.

Traffic on the river in 1823 was 39,516 tons, which generated tolls of £2,194. After the construction of the canal, traffic steadily declined, until income was insufficient to cover maintenance by the early 1860s. The canal company used a similar accounting practice to manage the Tone debt, inflating it at six per cent each year, to ensure that they could demonstrate that the river was unprofitable.

Navigation was further affected by the passing of the Somersetshire Drainage Act 1878 on 1 July 1878, which resulted in the River Parrett being taken over by the drainage commissioners, and abandoned as a navigation. Limited traffic continued to use the lower reaches of the Tone, with the last barge using the Burrowbridge to Ham Mills section in 1929. In 1967 the Somerset River Authority applied to the Ministry of Agriculture for permission to remove the navigation rights, and the original acts of Parliament were repealed under section 41 of the Land Drainage Act 1930. This allowed the river through Taunton to be straightened, and a weir to be constructed at Firepool, to improve the flood defences for Taunton. Above the weir, the river is still navigable as far as French Weir.

=== Watermills ===
Ham Mills was a site of milling activity from mediaeval times until about 1914. The mill was situated on an island in the middle of the river, with a weir and bypass channel to the north and the lock channel to the south. The Conservators were required to light the area after a boatman fell into the river and drowned while attempting to use the lock after dark in March 1826. The coroner who instructed that the lighting should be installed noted that "boats were passing at all hours of the night." Water levels in the river fell as more water was extracted further upstream, and by the 1890s the waterwheels were assisted by a steam-driven turbine which the miller installed. Milling ceased in 1914, when the boiler which supplied the steam was removed by the War Department, so that it could be fitted into a minesweeper. A surviving mill house which dates from the early 19th century has been designated by English Heritage as a Grade II listed building.

There had been a mill at Bathpool for several centuries, which had been rebuilt or adapted as required. In March 1812, the structure was burnt down by a fire, caused, according to the Taunton Courier, by "the excessive friction excited in the stones used in the process of shelling clover seeds". Stocks of flour, grain and flax valued at £2,500 were destroyed. The mill was rebuilt and later owned by Captain George Beadon. The mill was purchased by Thomas Redler in 1889 on the death of Beadon, but another fire damaged much of it two years later. Redler rebuilt it with safety in mind, and as at Ham, installed a steam-driven turbine as water levels were often inadequate to power the wheels. Two more turbines followed, and the water wheels were removed. Steam from the turbines was also used to heat bread ovens, which were amongst the first in the country to be heated in this way. In September 1915, another fire gutted the building, which was not rebuilt, and the ruins were demolished in the 1920s.

There were originally mills at Firepool and Obridge as well. Because of the difficulties of navigating past the mill pools, the Conservators of the River Tone decided to buy the mill at Firepool in December 1793 with a view to demolishing it "for the benefit of the navigation", and they obtained it for just £32. In 1797, they decided to follow the same course with Obridge Mill. The mill at Creech St Michael was the subject of a court action at the King's Bench. In October 1830, while replacing the mill stones, the millers had opened the flood gates for 16 days, and built a dam across the river, thus preventing navigation. The case was heard in 1831, and the judgement was that both parties were obligated to use the water in a way that did not cause injury to the other party.

== Flood defences ==
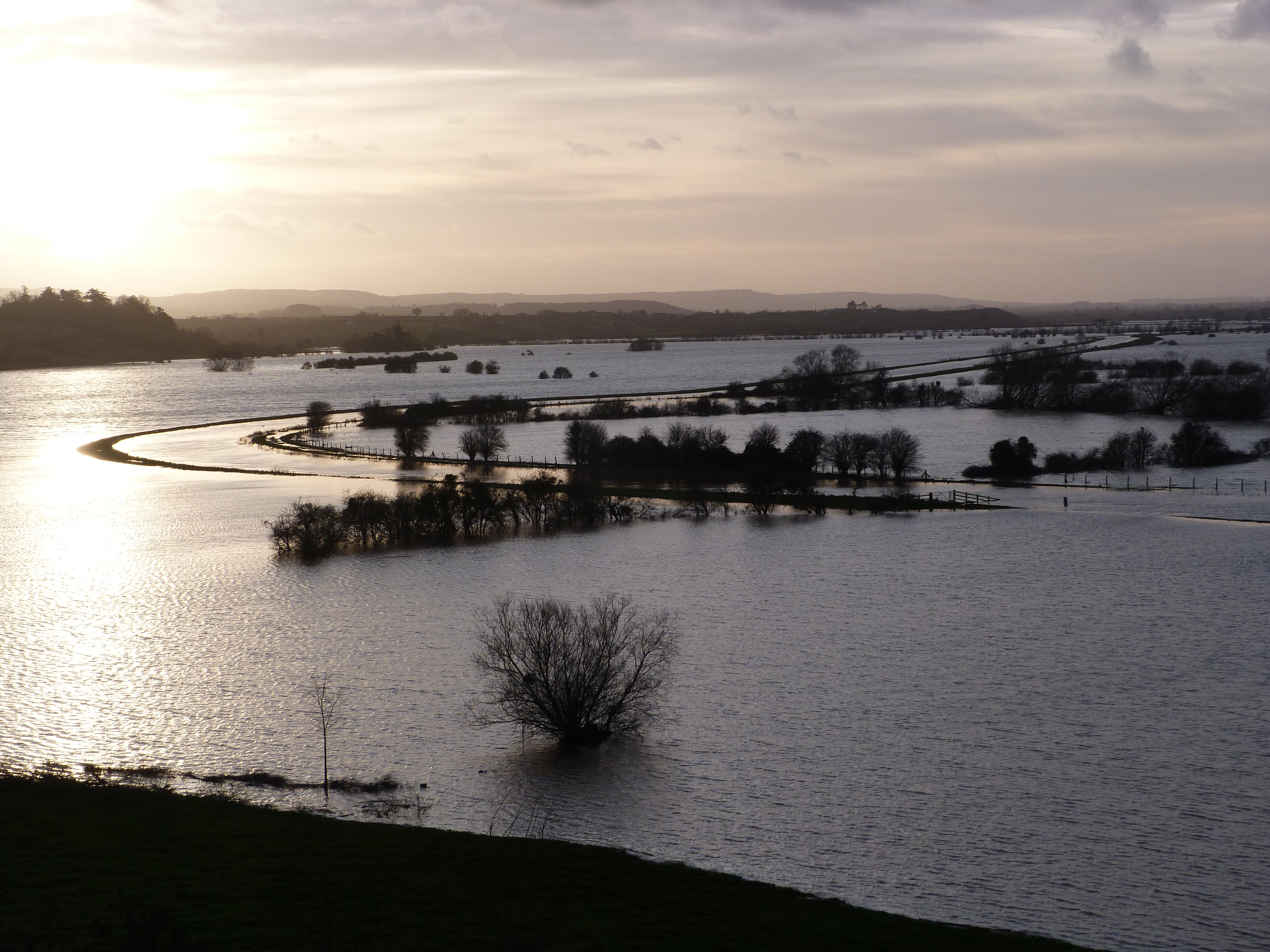
The River Tone in flood, Between Curry Moor and Hay Moor in 2013

The first Curry Moor pumping station was built in 1864, to house a steam engine and pump. A cottage for the operator was built next to it at the same time. This installation lasted until 1955, when a new pumphouse was constructed to house two diesel pumps. The steam engine was retained for historical reasons, and is located in part of the new building. The diesel pumps were supplemented by an electric pump in 1983, and a programme of refurbishment was carried out in 2008, which included the construction of a new outfall into the river.

In 1951, very heavy rainfall resulted in large portions of the Tone valley below Taunton flooding. Analysis of what had happened indicated that the channel was of insufficient size to carry the volume of water, which fell on the hills to the west and then flowed down the river. The easy solution of widening the channel was not available, as there were houses built along the south-eastern bank for around 2 miles (3.2 km) above the junction with the River Parrett. The flooding revealed that although these properties were not normally affected by floods, there was significant seepage through the banks. There was no likelihood of sufficient money being available to buy all the houses to demolish them, and so a program of constructing concrete cores in the centre of the banks began in 1956 and continued until 1964.

Rainfall in October 1960 was even heavier, when 9.72 inches (247 mm) fell on the Somerset Levels, representing 249% of the normal levels. Again the valley flooded, and large areas of Taunton were under water to a depth of 3 feet (0.91 m). Plans for a flood relief channel centred at first on the Bridgwater to Taunton Canal, which follows a slightly higher course to the west, and does not run through peat, but the estimated cost of £1.7 million was prohibitive, and so a scheme to upgrade the river costing around one third of that was implemented. This involved straightening of the river where it meandered, widening the bridge openings, and the demolition of navigation locks and weirs.

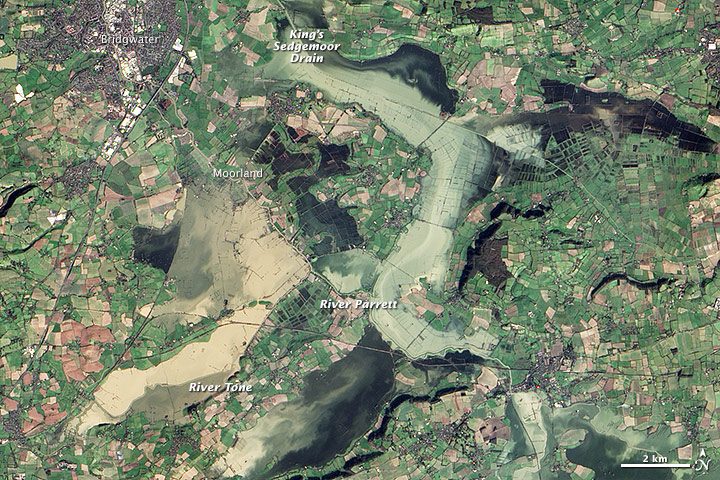
Satellite image showing the extent of flooding on 19 February 2014

A new sluice was constructed at Newbridge, incorporating tidal gates, which effectively prevent tides from passing further up the river. The removal of the navigation works at Ham proved particularly difficult, and acted as a training exercise for the Territorial Royal Engineers. Men from the 205 (Wessex) Field Squadron RE (TA) used 200 pounds (91 kg) of explosives to blow up the half-lock and a mud-filled barge which could not be moved. The river banks were raised to give more protection to the villages of Creech St Michael, Ham and Ruishton, but the channel was still only capable of discharging 2,500 cubic feet per second (71 m^{3}/s), whereas the channels through Taunton were designed to handle 4,500 cu ft/s (130 m^{3}/s), and were unlikely to overflow until discharges reached 6,000 cu ft/s (170 m^{3}/s). Curry Moor is therefore used as a washland, and excess water floods over it, to be pumped out at a later date by the Curry Moor pumping station, situated on the banks of the river below the railway bridge. The programme began in 1965 and was completed in 1967.

During the winter flooding of 2013–14 on the Somerset Levels, the River Tone overflowed at new year, during the rain and storms from Storm Dirk, with many residents asking for the Environment Agency to resume river dredging. On 24 January 2014, in light of the continued flooded extent of the Somerset Moors and forecast new rainfall as part of the winter storms of 2013–14 in the United Kingdom, both Somerset County Council and Sedgemoor District Council declared a major incident, as defined under the Civil Contingencies Act 2004. As a result of the extensive flooding dredging work was carried out. In addition plans were developed for a flood storage area or "Superpond" with a capacity of 1,800,000 cubic metres (64,000,000 cu ft), on the Tone at Taunton. Studies of the potential impact on the hydromorphology were carried out.

Point	Coordinates (Links to map resources)	OS Grid Ref	Notes
Beverton Pond	51.097°N 3.404°W	ST017340	Source of the River Tone
Clatworthy Reservoir	51.073°N 3.367°W	ST043312	Outfall to river
Washbattle Bridge	51.048°N 3.352°W	ST053285	
Waterrow Bridge	51.020°N 3.354°W	ST051254	
Greenham weir	50.975°N 3.313°W	ST078202	
E Nynehead Rly Bridge	50.998°N 3.199°W	ST159227	
Roughmoor Bridge	51.019°N 3.130°W	ST208250	
French weir	51.017°N 3.113°W	ST220247	
M5 motorway Bridge	51.023°N 3.058°W	ST259254	
Ham weir	51.022°N 3.019°W	ST286252	
Newbridge	51.038°N 2.976°W	ST316269	Tidal limit
Burrowbridge	51.067°N 2.917°W	ST358301	Junction with R Parrett

== Ecology ==
Clatworthy Reservoir is an important wildlife habitat managed by Wessex Water, and offers facilities for fishing and walking. The river and its tributaries support populations of European water vole (Arvicola amphibius). There may also be populations of white-clawed crayfish (Austropotamobius pallipes) and northern crested newts (Triturus cristatus). The fish species in the river include: chub, carp, grayling, roach, tench, rudd, perch and pike.

Curry and Hay Moors is a 472.8 hectares (1,168 acres) biological Site of Special Scientific Interest adjacent to the Tone. This part of the Somerset Levels and Moors is low-lying and flooding from the River Tone occurs in winter each year. The soil is Altcar series peats over which the river has lain alluvial clays. The range of flora and fauna which this soil and the ditches and rhyne support has led to its designation as an SSSI. Frogbit (Hydrocharis morsus-ranae), flowering rush (Butomus umbellatus), wood club-rush (Scirpus sylvaticus) and lesser water-plantain (Baldellia ranunculoides) are among the aquatic and bankside vascular plants which have been identified. The nationally rare soldier fly, (Odontomyia ornata) and nationally scarce species including the water beetles Agabus uliginosus, Hydaticus transversalis and Helophorus nanus are among the aquatic invertebrates living in the ditches. Significant numbers of waterfowl with several thousand northern lapwing, hundreds of snipe and some golden plover and dunlin can be found on the flooded fields in winter. The site is also of international importance for Bewick's swans. Raptor species such as Short-eared owls, merlins and peregrines are among raptors which use the site as a hunting ground in winter. Barred grass snake and common frogs along with Otters have been identified on the moor.

Southlake Moor is another biological Site of Special Scientific Interest, this one covering 196.1 hectares (485 acres) near the junction of the Tone and Parrett at Burrow Mump and Burrowbridge. Southlake Moor is another SSSI. The marshes and ditches provide grazing. At certain times of the year sluice gates can be opened to flood the moor. Greater water-parsnip (Sium latifolium) is among the 96 aquatic and vascular plant species on the moor. Numerous wildfowl visit the flooded moor; up to 22,000 wigeon (Anas penelope), 250 Bewick's swan (Cygnus bewickii) and significant populations of pochard (Aythya ferina), teal (Anas crecca) and tufted duck (Aythya fuligula). Signs of European otters (Lutra lutra) have also been seen on the river banks. Palmate newts (Triturus helveticus) have been found in surrounding ditches.

== See also ==
- Canals of the United Kingdom
- History of the British canal system

== Bibliography ==
- Body, Geoff; Gallop, Roy (2015). Any Muddy Bottom: A History of Somerset's Waterborne Trade. History Press. ISBN 978-0-7509-6163-9.
- Environment Agency (2014). "Rivers Parrett and Tone Dredge – Bank Profile Restoration Environmental Statement Addendum July 2014" (PDF). Environment Agency. Archived (PDF) from the original on 15 March 2016.
- Hadfield, Charles (1967). The Canals of South West England. David and Charles. ISBN 978-0-7153-4176-6.
- Haskell, Tony (1994). By Waterway to Taunton. Somerset Books. ISBN 978-0-86183-260-6.
- National Rivers Authority (1995). "River Tone catchment management plan : consultation report" (PDF). National Rivers Authority South West Region. Archived (PDF) from the original on 3 March 2016.
- Priestley, Joseph (1831). "Historical Account of the Navigable Rivers, Canals, and Railways of Great Britain". Archived from the original on 7 March 2016.
- Williams, Michael (1970). The Draining of the Somerset Levels. Cambridge: Cambridge University Press. ISBN 978-0-521-07486-5.
