= Trull =

Village and civil parish in Somerset, England

Coordinates: 50.9965°N 3.1199°W

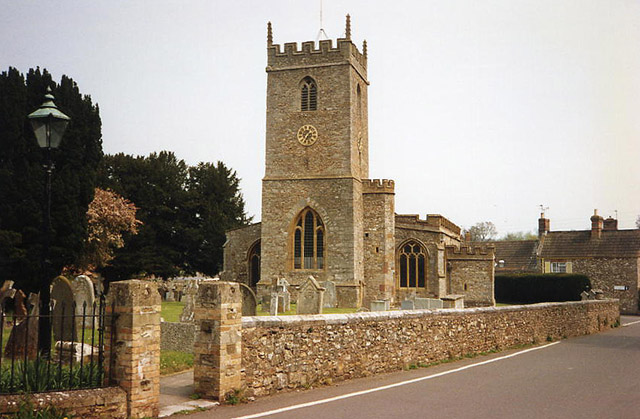
- Church of All Saints, Trull

- Location within Somerset
- Population: 2,288 (2011)
- OS grid reference: ST215225
- Civil parish: Trull
- Unitary authority: Somerset Council
- Ceremonial county: Somerset
- Region: South West
- Country: England
- Sovereign state: United Kingdom
- Post town: TAUNTON
- Postcode district: TA3
- Dialling code: 01823
- Police: Avon and Somerset
- Fire: Devon and Somerset
- Ambulance: South Western
- UK Parliament: Taunton and Wellington

Trull is a village, electoral ward and civil parish in Somerset, England, situated near Taunton. The parish, which includes Dipford and Staplehay, has a population of 2,288.

== History ==
The name Trull is thought to derive from the word Trendle meaning circle or wheel.

The parish of Trull was part of the Taunton Deane Hundred.

== Governance ==
The parish council has responsibility for local issues, including setting an annual precept (local rate) to cover the council’s operating costs.

For local government purposes, since 1 April 2023, the village comes under the unitary authority of Somerset Council. Prior to this, it was part of the non-metropolitan district of Somerset West and Taunton (formed on 1 April 2019) and, before this, the district of Taunton Deane (established under the Local Government Act 1972). From 1894-1974, for local government purposes, Trull was part of Taunton Rural District.

It is also part of the Taunton and Wellington county constituency represented in the House of Commons of the Parliament of the United Kingdom. It elects one Member of Parliament (MP) by the first past the post system of election.

== Religious sites ==
All Saints’ Church has a tower dating from the 13th century; the rest is 15th-century. It was served by the monks of Taunton Priory until 1308. The east window, dating from the 15th century, depicts the crucifixion with St John and the Mother of Jesus at the foot of the Cross. The pulpit is believed to date from around 1500. The building has been designated by English Heritage as a Grade I listed building.
