= Stawley =

Village in Somerset, England

Coordinates: 50.9942°N 3.3336°W

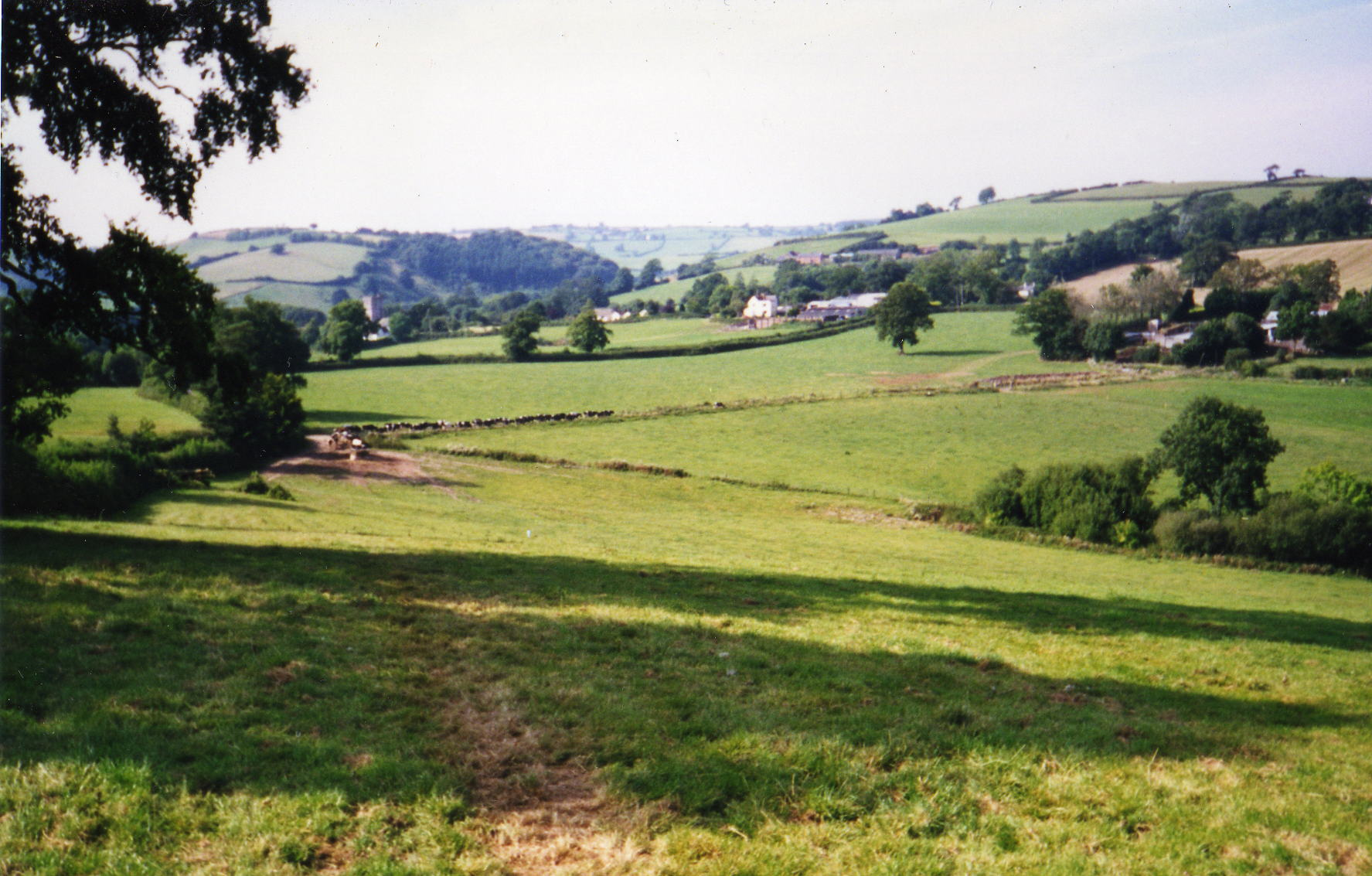
- Stawley from Ham Hill

- Location within Somerset
- Population: 279 (2011)
- OS grid reference: ST065225
- Unitary authority: Somerset Council
- Ceremonial county: Somerset
- Region: South West
- Country: England
- Sovereign state: United Kingdom
- Post town: Wellington
- Postcode district: TA21
- Dialling code: 01823
- Police: Avon and Somerset
- Fire: Devon and Somerset
- Ambulance: South Western
- UK Parliament: Tiverton and Minehead

Stawley is a village and civil parish in Somerset, England, situated 10 miles (16.1 km) west of Taunton. The parish has a population of 279 and includes the village of Kittisford and the hamlets of Appley, Greenham and Tracebridge.

== History ==
The manor was recorded in Domesday Book of 1086 as held by Robert and Herbert from the overlord Alfred d'Epaignes. Later the manor was the property of the Powlett family of Hinton St George. The parishes of Kittisford and Stawley were part of the historic Milverton hundred.

Hill Farm was built in the late 16th century. It is a Grade II* listed building. The farm now has around 100 goats and makes three kinds of cheese.

== Greenham ==
The hamlet of Greenham is located on the banks of the River Tone, and has two historic houses within its area. The 19th century St Peter's Church, Greenham, was built in the Gothic Revival style and was consecrated on 7 July 1860 on land given to the parish by Thomas Edward Clarke, of Tremlett House.

=== Historic estates ===
- Cothay Manor House was built around 1480.
- Greenham Barton was built in 1280.
- Kittisford Barton. Gerald Gardiner took the title "Baron Gardiner of Kittisford" when he was made a life peer.

== Amenities ==
Since 1999 work has been underway to move and re-establish the village shop and post office, which opened on a new site in 2006 near the primary school.

== Governance ==
The parish council has responsibility for local issues, including setting an annual precept (local rate) to cover the council’s operating costs and producing annual accounts for public scrutiny. The parish council evaluates local planning applications and works with the local police, district council officers, and neighbourhood watch groups on matters of crime, security, and traffic. The parish council's role also includes initiating projects for the maintenance and repair of parish facilities, as well as consulting with the district council on the maintenance, repair, and improvement of highways, drainage, footpaths, public transport, and street cleaning. Conservation matters (including trees and listed buildings) and environmental issues are also the responsibility of the council.

For local government purposes, since 1 April 2023, the village comes under the unitary authority of Somerset Council. Prior to this, it was part of the non-metropolitan district of Somerset West and Taunton (formed on 1 April 2019) and, before this, the district of Taunton Deane (established under the Local Government Act 1972). From 1894-1974, for local government purposes, Stawley was part of Wellington Rural District.

It is also part of the Tiverton and Minehead county constituency represented in the House of Commons of the Parliament of the United Kingdom. It elects one Member of Parliament (MP) by the first past the post system of election.

== Geography ==
The soil consists of clay, with a subsoil of sandstone and limestone. The village has a high density of rare flora and fauna, including eight species of endangered birds.

== Religious sites ==
The parish Church of St Michael dates from the 13th century and has been designated as a Grade I listed building. The church register dates from 1528.

The Church of St Nicholas in Kittisford dates from the 15th century.
