= Creech St Michael =

Coordinates: 51.026°N 3.039°W

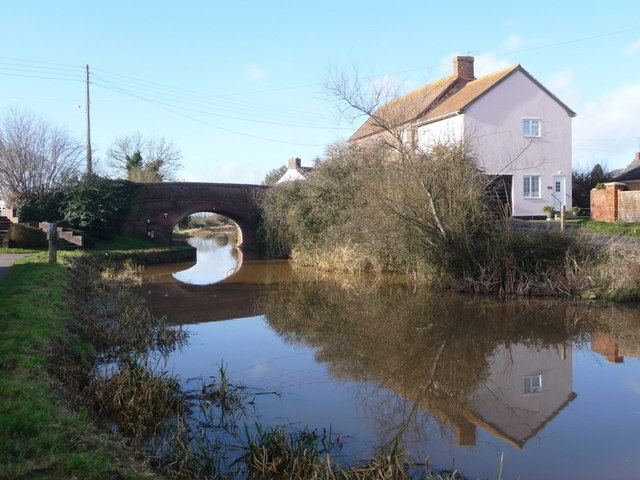
- Main bridge over the canal

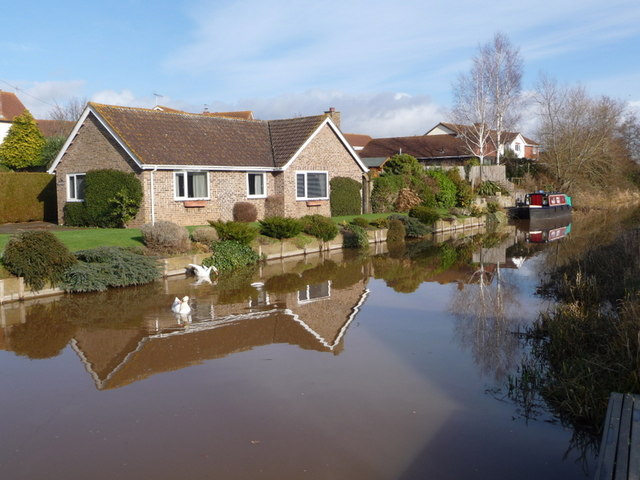
- Canalside bungalow

- Location within Somerset
- Population: 2,416 (2011)
- OS grid reference: ST273253
- Unitary authority: Somerset Council
- Ceremonial county: Somerset
- Region: South West
- Country: England
- Sovereign state: United Kingdom
- Post town: TAUNTON
- Postcode district: TA2, TA3
- Dialling code: 01823
- Police: Avon and Somerset
- Fire: Devon and Somerset
- Ambulance: South Western
- UK Parliament: Taunton and Wellington

Creech St Michael is a village and civil parish in Somerset, three miles (5 km) east of Taunton. The parish straddles the M5 motorway and includes several scattered settlements. The village of Creech St Michael and the hamlets of Charlton, Creech Heathfield, and Ham lie east of the motorway. The hamlets of Adsborough, Coombe, Langaller, and Walford lie west of the motorway. The parish has a population of 2,416.

== History ==
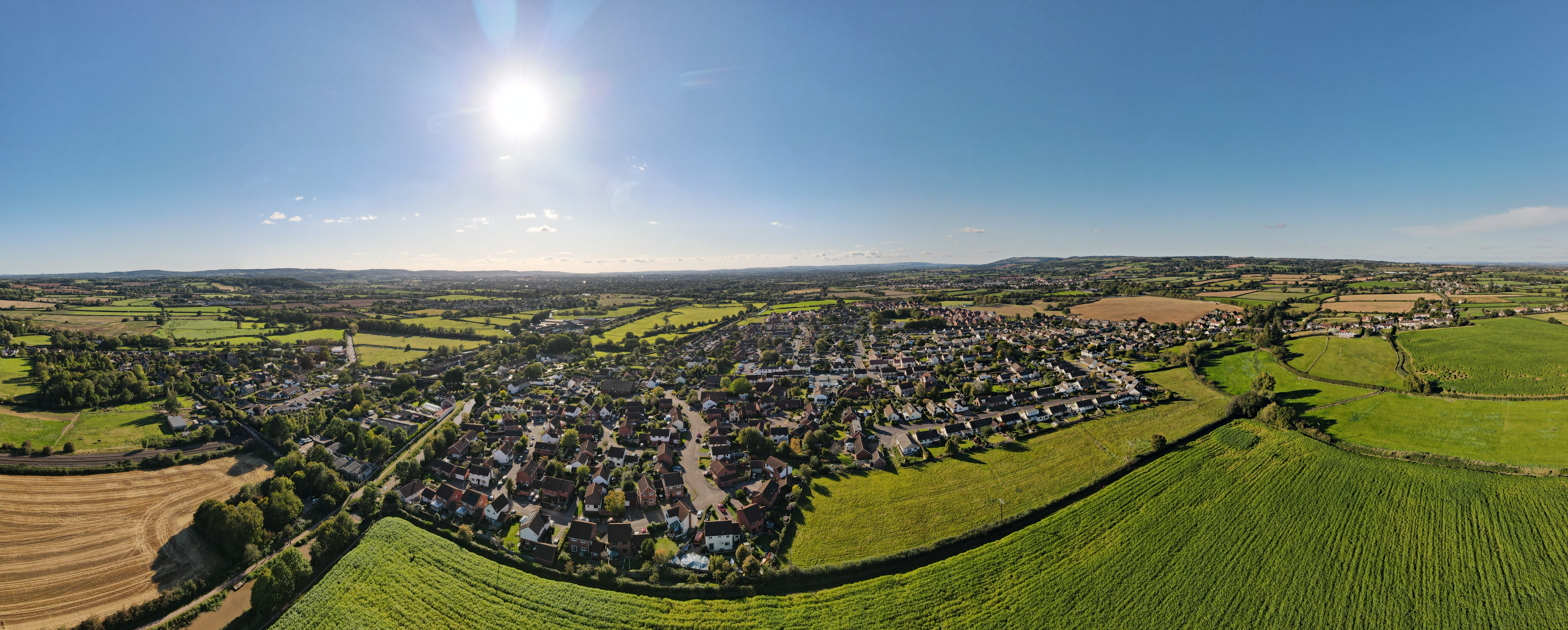
Panoramic of Creech St Michael

The name derives from the Celtic crug, "hill"(although local residents think it means "creek", because the area is relatively flat), and the parish church of St. Michael, which dates from the 13th century.

Creech St Michael was part of the hundred of Andersfield.

Charlton House is a Grade II listed manor house, formerly in the ownership of the Acland and Coombe families.

The Bridgwater & Taunton Canal provides a picturesque route through the village for pleasure boats, and the towpath is open to pedestrians and cyclists. There are also dramatic remains of the Chard Canal, including the (filled) junction with the Bridgwater & Taunton Canal, a raised embankment leading south from the village, a ruined aqueduct that would have carried the canal over the River Tone, and the abutments of a second aqueduct across a local road.

The Bristol and Exeter Railway line was opened through the village in 1842 and the junction of the Chard Branch Line was located here in 1860, but Creech St Michael railway station was not opened until 13 August 1928. The station was actually north of the junction so was only used by trains to Yeovil and Bristol. It closed on 5 October 1964 but the line is still open, forming a part of the London to Penzance main line. The branch is closed but remains of it are visible. including the skeleton of a five-arched bridge across the River Tone, and an embankment curving south, parallel to the abandoned canal.

A large paper mill was built on the river to the west of the village in 1875, finally closing in 1993.

In the Second World War, a line of fortifications was built on the boundary of the village, as part of the Taunton Stop Line. The line was meant to contain any German invasion of the south west peninsula. Several pillboxes remain along the Bridgwater & Taunton Canal, one at the old junction with the Chard canal, and one on the embankment of the Chard railway.

== Governance ==
The parish council has responsibility for local issues, including setting an annual precept (local rate) to cover the council's operating costs and producing annual accounts for public scrutiny. The parish council evaluates local planning applications and works with the local police, district council officers, and neighbourhood watch groups on matters of crime, security, and traffic. The parish council's role also includes initiating projects for the maintenance and repair of parish facilities, as well as consulting with the district council on the maintenance, repair, and improvement of highways, drainage, footpaths, public transport, and street cleaning. Conservation matters (including trees and listed buildings) and environmental issues are also the responsibility of the council.

For local government purposes, since 1 April 2023, the village comes under the unitary authority of Somerset Council. Prior to this, it was part of the non-metropolitan district of Somerset West and Taunton (formed on 1 April 2019) and, before this, the district of Taunton Deane (established under the Local Government Act 1972). From 1894 to 1974, for local government purposes, Creech St Michael was part of Taunton Rural District.

It is also part of the Taunton and Wellington county constituency represented in the House of Commons of the Parliament of the United Kingdom. It elects one Member of Parliament (MP) by the first past the post system of election. Prior to Brexit in 2020 it was part of the South West England constituency of the European Parliament.
