= Pitminster =

Village in Somerset, England

Coordinates: 50.9696°N 3.1051°W

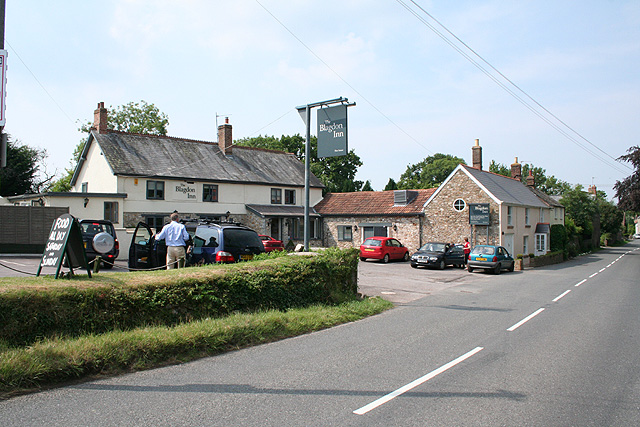
- Blagdon Hill

- Location within Somerset
- Population: 956 (2011)
- OS grid reference: ST225195
- Unitary authority: Somerset Council
- Ceremonial county: Somerset
- Region: South West
- Country: England
- Sovereign state: United Kingdom
- Post town: TAUNTON
- Postcode district: TA3
- Dialling code: 01823
- Police: Avon and Somerset
- Fire: Devon and Somerset
- Ambulance: South Western
- UK Parliament: Taunton and Wellington

Pitminster is a village and civil parish in Somerset, England, situated 4 miles (6.4 km) south of Taunton. The parish has a population of 956. The parish also includes the villages of Angersleigh and Blagdon Hill. The village of Blagdon is now officially known as Blagdon Hill to distinguish it from Blagdon in North Somerset. Hillside hamlets in the parish comprise Feltham and Woodram, those on the lower plain in the north are Sellicks Green which is contiguous with Blagdon Hill, Duddlestone and Poundisford.

== History ==
The name Pitminster means the minster or mother church of Pippa's people.

In 938, King Athelstan gave the estate, along with nearby Corfe as a tithing to the Bishop of Winchester. By the early 13th century the bishops had established a deer park in the parish which was visited by King John in 1208.

The parishes of Angersleigh and Pitminster were part of the Taunton Deane Hundred.

== Governance ==
The parish council has responsibility for local issues, including setting an annual precept (local rate) to cover the council's operating costs and producing annual accounts for public scrutiny. The parish council evaluates local planning applications and works with the local police, district council officers, and neighbourhood watch groups on matters of crime, security, and traffic. The parish council's role also includes initiating projects for the maintenance and repair of parish facilities, as well as consulting with the district council on the maintenance, repair, and improvement of highways, drainage, footpaths, public transport, and street-cleaning. Conservation matters (including trees and listed buildings) and environmental issues are also the responsibility of the council.

For local government purposes, since 1 April 2023, the village comes under the unitary authority of Somerset Council. Prior to this, it was part of the non-metropolitan district of Somerset West and Taunton (formed on 1 April 2019) and, before this, the district of Taunton Deane (established under the Local Government Act 1972). From 1894 to 1974, for local government purposes, Pitminster was part of Taunton Rural District.

The appropriate electoral ward is called 'Blackdown', the most populous area being 'Pitminster'. From there the ward stretches south to Churchstanton. The total ward population at the 2011 Census is 2,064.

It is also part of the Taunton and Wellington county constituency represented in the House of Commons of the Parliament of the United Kingdom. It elects one Member of Parliament (MP) by the first past the post system of election.

== Geography ==
The nearby Prior's Park & Adcombe Wood is a 103.6 hectare (256.0 acre) biological Site of Special Scientific Interest with excellent examples of several of the broadleaved semi-natural woodland types associated with the Blackdown Hills. Additional interest lies in the occurrence of several areas of unimproved marshy grassland. This site, which is partly managed by the Somerset Wildlife Trust, is situated on the north facing slopes of the Blackdown Hills, overlooking the Vale of Taunton Deane.

== Landmarks ==
Poundisford Park is a manor house built around 1550 for William Hill. The house was passed down through the Hill family with a dining room being added in 1692 and eventually sold to the Welmans in 1706, the Helyars in 1869 and the Vivian-Neals in 1928.

== Religious sites ==
The parish Church of St Andrew and St Mary was built around 1300 and has been designated as a Grade I listed building.

The 14th-century Church of St Michael in Angersleigh has been designated by English Heritage as a Grade II* listed building.

== Notable residents ==
Richard Treat (1584–1669) and his son Robert Treat (1622–1710), who went on to be an American politician, lived in the village.
