= Milverton =

Milverton may refer to:

== Places ==
- Milverton, Ontario, Canada
  - Milverton Four Wheel Drives, a senior hockey team based out of Milverton, Ontario
- Milverton, Somerset, England
  - Church of St Michael, Milverton, Somerset
  - Hundred of Milverton, a historical Hundred in the ceremonial county of Somerset
  - The Old House, Milverton, Somerset, a Grade II* listed building
- Milverton, Leamington, an electoral ward of Leamington Spa, Warwickshire, England

== People ==
- Baron Milverton, a title in the Peerage of the United Kingdom
  - Arthur Richards, 1st Baron Milverton (1885–1978)
- Charles Augustus Milverton, a fictional character in "The Adventure of Charles Augustus Milverton" by Arthur Conan Doyle

== See also ==
- Old Milverton, a hamlet near Leamington Spa, England
- Warwick (Milverton) railway station, England
