= Church of St James the Great, Fitzhead =

Church in Somerset, England

Church of St James the Great
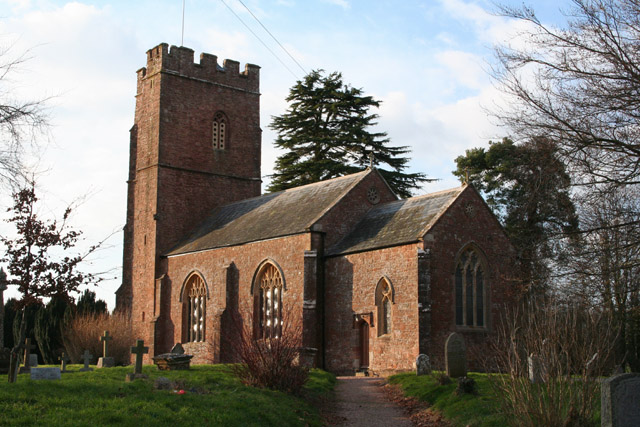

- Location within Somerset
- 51.0481°N 3.2571°W
- Location: Fitzhead, Somerset, England

History
- Built: 15th century

Listed Building – Grade II*
- Official name: Church of St James the Great
- Designated: 25 January 1956
- Reference no.: 1175726

The Anglican Church of St James the Great in Fitzhead, Somerset, England was built in the 15th century. It is a Grade II* listed building.

== History ==
The church was built in the 15th century from which the tower survives. The three-bay nave and chancel were rebuilt in 1849 and a vestry added in 1863. The north aisle was added in 1887. Next to the church is a medieval tithe barn.

The parish is part of the Milverton with Halse, Fitzhead and Ash Priors benefice within the Diocese of Bath and Wells.

== Architecture ==
The red sandstone building has hamstone dressings. The three stage tower is supported by diagonal buttresses.

Inside the church is a 15th-century rood screen. In 2009 ceramic panels by local potter John Watt, depicting local scenes, were installed in the church.

In the churchyard is a 14th-century grey sandstone cross which was restored in 1908. As well as being a listed building it has been scheduled as an ancient monument.

Several of the tombs in the churchyard are also listed, including the late 17th century chest tombs of Ann Brulard, and Mary Byam. There are also unidentified tombs from the 17th and 18th centuries,

The gates and gatepiers were installed in the early 19th century.

== See also ==
- List of ecclesiastical parishes in the Diocese of Bath and Wells
