= Church of St James, Halse =

Church in Somerset, England

Church of St James
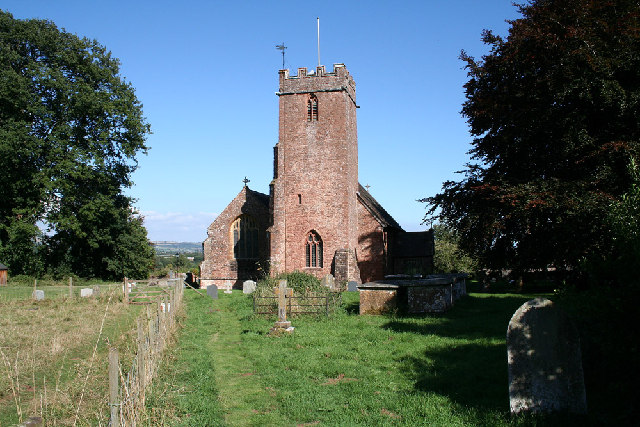

- Location within Somerset

General information
- Location: Halse, Somerset, England
- Coordinates: 51.0425°N 3.2283°W
- Completed: 15th century

The Church of St James in Halse, Somerset, England dates from the Norman period and is dedicated St James the Less. It has been designated as a Grade I listed building.

The church includes some 12th and 13th century work, including the tower, but the current building was mainly built in the 15th century. The north aisle was built around 1546 and the church was restored in 1900. The brickwork is red sandstone which was laid down during the Triassic Period, with dressings of Hamstone.

The interior includes a fan-vaulted rood screen, which was previously larger but parts of it were removed in 1803.

The Anglican parish is within the benefice of Milverton with Halse, Fitzhead and Ash Priors within the archdeaconry of Taunton.

== See also ==
- List of Grade I listed buildings in Taunton Deane
- List of towers in Somerset
- List of ecclesiastical parishes in the Diocese of Bath and Wells
