= Church of the Holy Trinity, Ash Priors =

Church in Somerset, England

Church of the Holy Trinity
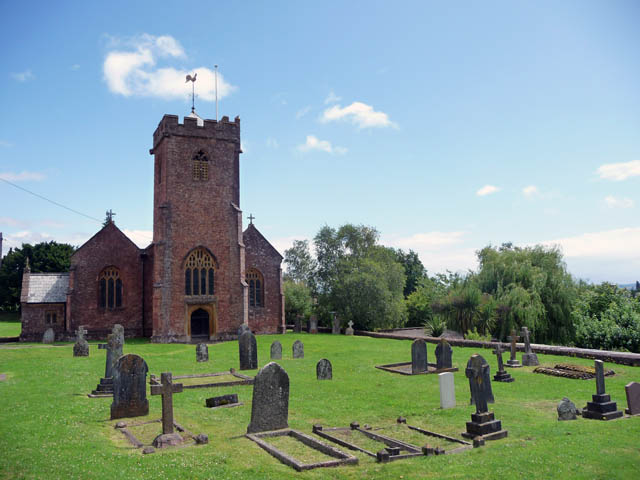

- Location within Somerset
- 51.0584°N 3.2117°W
- Location: Ash Priors, Somerset, England

Listed Building – Grade II*
- Official name: Church of the Holy Trinity
- Designated: 25 February 1955
- Reference no.: 1344823

The Church of the Holy Trinity in Ash Priors, Somerset, England was built in the 15th century. It is a Grade II* listed building.

== History ==
In the 14th century the village of Ash was granted to Taunton Priory as its mother church. This led to the village being known as "Ash Priors".

The church was built in the 15th century with the south aisle being added in 1833.

The parish is part of the benefice of Milverton with Halse, Fitzhead and Ash Priors within the Diocese of Bath and Wells. The usual Sunday attendance is between 12 and 20 people.

== Architecture ==
The red sandstone building has a slate roof. The three-stage tower is supported by diagonal buttresses.

The churchyard contains two war graves, one from the first world war and one from the second.

== See also ==
- List of ecclesiastical parishes in the Diocese of Bath and Wells
