= St Michael's Church, Milverton =

Church in Somerset, England

Church of St Michael
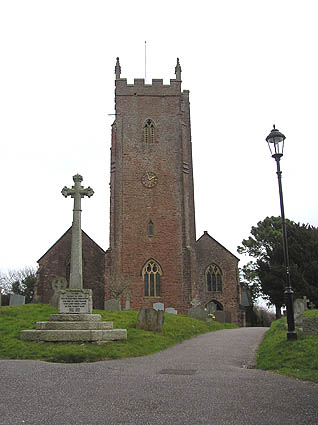
- St Michael's Church in Milverton, England

- Location within Somerset

General information
- Location: Milverton, England
- Coordinates: 51.0256°N 3.2537°W
- Completed: 13th century

The Church of St Michael in Milverton, Somerset, England dates from the 13th century, on the site of an even earlier chapel, and has been designated as a Grade I listed building.

The church is built of red sandstone with Hamstone dressings. The carved benches date from the mid 16th century. In 1850 St Michael's was extended and repaired by Exeter-based architect John Hayward.

== Architecture ==
The parish Church of St Michael in Milverton was designated as a Grade I listed building on 25 January 1956. Some of the original thirteenth-century structure remains at the base of the tower but the building dates mostly from the fourteenth and fifteenth centuries. It was restored between 1849 and 1850. It is constructed of red sandstone rubble stone with Hamstone dressings, and slate roofs. The plan consists of a four-bay nave, four-bay north and south aisles, each extending one bay further east than the nave, a south, fourteenth-century porch and a west tower. The tower is tall and set at an oblique angle to the rest of the building. It is built in three stages and has crenellations, pinnacles at the top corners and diagonal buttresses. The north wall of the tower was at one time used for playing the racquet game fives. The north wall of the church has stepped buttresses between the windows.

The interior of the church is rendered and has octagonal piers supporting asymmetric, double-chamfered arches. There are wagon roofs, galleries in both the north and south aisles, and a circular Norman font. The bench ends of the pews are elaborately carved and date to the early sixteenth century. The early twentieth-century screen incorporates some pieces of late fifteenth- and early sixteenth-century carvings.

The Anglican parish is part of the benefice of Milverton with Halse, Fitzhead, and Ash Priors within the archdeaconry of Taunton.

== See also ==
- List of Grade I listed buildings in Taunton Deane
- List of towers in Somerset
- List of ecclesiastical parishes in the Diocese of Bath and Wells
