= Thorverton =

Village in Devon, England

Coordinates: 50°48′N 3°32′W

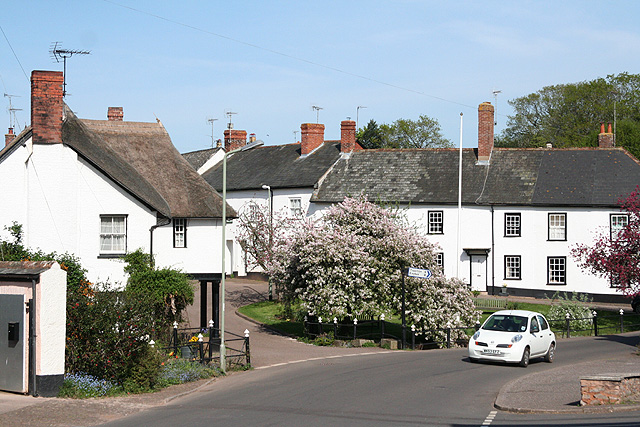
Thorverton, the junction of Silver Street and Jericho Street.

Thorverton is a civil parish and village in Devon, England, about a mile west of the River Exe and 8 miles (13 km) north of Exeter. It is almost centrally located between Exeter and the towns of Tiverton, Cullompton and Crediton, and contains the hamlets of Yellowford and Raddon. The parish is surrounded, clockwise from the north, by the parishes of Bickleigh, Rewe, Nether Exe, Brampford Speke, Upton Pyne, Shobrooke, Stockleigh Pomeroy and Cadbury. Most of the eastern boundary of the parish is formed by the River Exe and the land rises westwards to 800 feet (240 m) at the border with Cadbury.

The population of the parish was 674 as of the 2011 Census. Thorverton is a major part of the Cadbury electoral ward. The population of this ward at the 2011 Census was 1,602.

Thorverton has two churches and two public houses. The Millennium Green provides walking alongside the stream which runs through the centre of the village. The Memorial Hall provides a centre for entertainment, with a monthly Saturday Market for local produce. A local village magazine, Focus on Thorverton, is produced by volunteers.

== History ==
=== Early history ===
The name of Thorverton derives from the Anglo-Scandinavian personal name Thurferth with the Old English tun, meaning 'estate'. Documentary evidence for old names for the settlement include Torverton from 1182 to the 13th century; Thorverton(e) from 1263; and Thurfurton in 1340.

There was briefly a small settlement here during Roman times, perched on a hill overlooking a fording point across the River Exe (near to the current day bridge), a key crossing for the military garrisoned at Exeter (Isca Dumnoniorum).

There is no mention of Thorverton in the Domesday Book, though Thorn and Thorn (1985) note that it would have been part of the large manor of Silverton and was given to the monastery of Marmoutier at Tours by either King Henry III or by William the Conqueror himself (records differ). However, Raddon, now known as Raddon Court, 1 mile (1.6 km) west of Thorverton, is mentioned in the Domesday book. It was held by William the usher from Tavistock Abbey.

Thorverton Mill was running at this time on the River Exe, (and continued to do so until its closure in 1979).

At the centre of the village is a wide rectangle known as The Bury, which probably dates from Anglo-Saxon times when it was used as a refuge for cattle at times of crisis. It later became the site for sheep and cattle fairs and markets which continued until around 1900.

=== The Civil War ===
During the Civil War, Thorverton, as the location of a major crossing, was often on the front line. In 1644 the Parliamentarians under the Earl of Essex were besieging Royalist Exeter. Some of the Roundhead troops marched into Thorverton, destroyed a large stock of oats, damaged possessions of the Church and took money from the parson and Mr Tuckfield at Raddon Court. Parson Travers and Mr Tuckfield were known loyalists and were therefore targeted for rough treatment.

The Roundheads moved off into Cornwall and subsequent defeat, leaving Thorverton in Royalist control with a military presence. A line against attack from the Midlands was formed between Eggesford and Cullompton, with Thorverton the bridgehead and the headquarters of General Goring along with several thousand troops.

It was to Thorverton that the 15-year-old Prince of Wales (later Charles II) came out from the walled city of Exeter to review his troops. The force retreated in the face of Fairfax and his Roundheads however in October 1645. Fairfax and a seemingly endless line of Parliamentary infantrymen moved through Thorverton on the way to Newton St Cyres and Crediton. Across the bridge, up Silver Street, past the Dolphin and out past Bullen Head.

Parliamentary troops were then stationed in Thorverton whilst Exeter was besieged for the second time and fell in April 1646. Following that all military activity left Thorverton in peace.

=== The Second World War ===
During the Second World War, Thorverton was used as a billet for American artillery troops prior to D-Day. 'A' Battery, 953rd Field Artillery Battalion lived within the village between November 1943 and Spring 1944. 'B' Battery stayed in Silverton. During this time they prepared for the D-Day invasion using firing ranges on Dartmoor. The 953rd set sail on D-Day + 3 and landed at the Normandy beaches on D-Day +5. They were heavily involved in repulsing the German counter-offensive at the Battle of the Bulge in winter 1944/45.

A memorial plaque to the 953rd's stay in Thorverton can be found in the Millennium Green. The plaque was presented to the village in 2002 by a former officer of the 953rd (W.M.C Arthur of Jaffrey, New Hampshire) and dedicated to the memory of Suzanne Easterbrook, who died in that year, "and other fine people of Thorverton who were so welcoming to the young American soldiers".

== Geology ==
Thorverton, located on clay and sand, has a subsoil of red rock, which gives the fertile earth its distinctive red colouring. The area is rich in rare and unusual rocks and minerals. Manganese has been found near Upton Pyne, and small quantities of gold in local streams. An igneous rock has been quarried at Raddon since the 12th century and the bubbled rock can be seen in numerous examples of local stonework.

== Agriculture, fairs and the community ==
Agriculture was the main activity associated with the village, and there are many ancient farmhouses within the parish. Raddon Court was a Saxon estate. Upcott farm, Bidwell farm and Lynch farm have also been there for many years. Traymill, to the north of the parish on the Exe, was built about 1400 and has traceried windows, arched doorways and still retains the original hall roof.

The fertile red soil produced excellent wheat, barley and apples, which were the main crops. An orchard covered the rear grounds (now gardens) behind the cottages on the south side of Bullen Street. A few apple trees remain. Thorverton was also once well known locally for its apricots.

There were two main fairs held in the parish each year, which were customary holidays for the scholars at the National School. One took place on the last Monday in February, chiefly for "fat sheep", and the second on the Monday following 18 July for lambs - at which upwards of 40,000 were frequently sold for rearing. There was a monthly cattle fair and Thorverton was noted for its excellent breed of sheep. The fairs have since ceased, but in their place the village still enjoys annual festivities during the summer with Church Week and the Country Show.

Thorverton was once a thriving, self-sufficient community. In 1850, there were four bakers, three blacksmiths in the cottages along Bullen Street. One of the blacksmiths also covered any dentistry requirements. There were three butchers, one of which was located at the prominent stilted building in the centre of the village next to the green, built in 1763 in the local style of the time. Four grocers, two saddlers, two shoemakers, four tailors - one of which lived in Dinneford Street - two wheelwrights (a prosperous waggon-works in Jericho Street), and two plumbers. Also a builder, corn miller, apple nurseryman and a maltster.

In addition to these trades, Thorverton had a parson and a curate, a surgeon, a solicitor, an accountant, an auctioneer, and a veterinary surgeon. For rural services there was a builder, a corn-miller, an apple-nurseryman, an agricultural machine-maker, a maltster, and a druggist.

The Bury was lined with shops, now almost all converted to private homes, the broad windows of which still speak of a prosperous recent past. The last shop - known as 'The Dairy' closed in 2006. For ten years, the needs of the village were served by a second hand mobile ex-library vehicle situated in the car park which was driven up and down the road outside the Thorverton Arms until a permanent place at the village car park was agreed. In 2016 Berry Dairy General Stores was re-established in the original Dairy in the centre of the village.

The business of the Post Office is conducted from a portable cabin within the village car park. The original Post Office, now a private home in the centre of the village on the corner of Bullen Street and School Lane, was run by three generations of the Cummings family from 1870 to 1994, commemorated today by a blue plaque.

The car park itself was created on the site of a former quarry.

A channelled stream, which drains the Raddon (literally 'red hill') Hills to the north and runs to the River Exe, winds through the village, characteristic of several East Devon villages. A pedestrian bridge and ford cross the stream at Silver Street.

There was a second ford across the stream beside Abbotsford which allowed passage to the old vicarage, which was sited between Garden Cottage and Mar Lodge. This village feature has now, unfortunately, disappeared, following embankment by the properties on either side of it.

The village green at the bottom of Jericho Street once hosted a large fir tree - planted by 10-year-old Mary Norrish of Raddon Court Barton at the time of Queen Victoria's Golden Jubilee in 1887. Its lop-sidedness is prominent in many of the old photographs of Thorverton. The tree eventually became too big and was taken down in 1947 for the price of the wood contained within it. Every December a Christmas tree, decorated with lights, is placed on the same spot as the old Jubilee tree.

Cobbled streets have been preserved throughout the centre of the village, as has an elaborate system of watercourses established in the 1850s; the idea of the Rector's daughter following a serious outbreak of cholera.

== Bridges ==
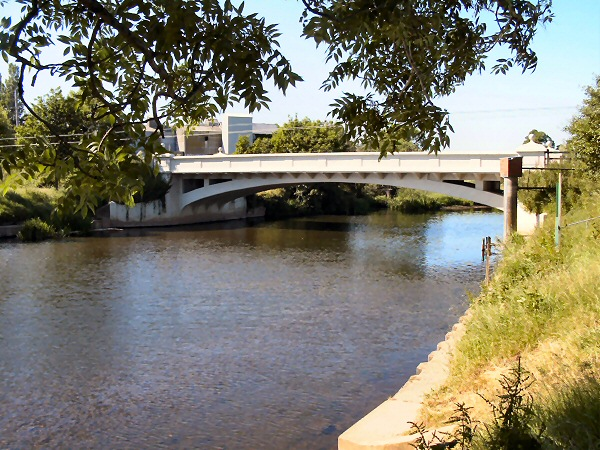
The current Thorverton bridge.

Thorverton's population was once much larger as the village rested near the primary means for crossing the River Exe on the main road from London towards Cornwall. It remained so until the mid-18th century. Further to this, the bridge stands on the site of an ancient fordable crossing point and accounts for the main reason the village came into existence.

The bridge currently spanning the River Exe is a modern concrete construction, but it is the successor to several earlier bridges. The first bridge, constructed of timber, was placed here in 1307. The timber bridge was replaced with a stone one in 1415 thanks to a donation of £10 by Thomas Barton of Exeter.

The quarry at the site of the Council Car Park was used in 1811 to provide stone for the new Thorverton bridge, to be built by county surveyor, James Green. The bridge was completed within two years, but Green complained that he had lost £1200 in building it because of issues with the quarry. Quarry owner, John Niner of the Barliabins estate, received payment for the stone as well as compensation for the damage done to his land. Green's bridge lasted until 1912, when the current bridge was constructed to take heavier traffic.

A 32-metre weir was constructed across the river here in 1973 due to the unstable condition of the riverbed. A monitoring station was put in place here by the Rivers Authority in 1956 for the purpose of flood warning monitoring in advance of Exeter. The Environment Agency has since installed web cameras here which can be viewed by the public online.

== Public houses ==
Because of the centuries of national as well as local traffic crossing the bridge, there were once no less than five coaching inns in the village, two of which remain today. The Exeter and the Thorverton Arms are still open today but the Bell Inn ceased trading in 2010, having planning permission granted to turn it into residential dwellings.

The Thorverton Arms in the centre of the village, for the majority of its life known as 'The Dolphin', was built in the 16th century. Amusing, if lurid, tales of its past provide a glimpse of the human life of Thorverton's past. A traveller turned up at The Dolphin one evening in 1650 and took a room for himself and his sister. The landlord, after a while, had reason to suspect their relationship and confronted them. The traveller blandly replied that as Adam and Eve were the father and mother of us all, the lady could truthfully be described as his 'sister'.

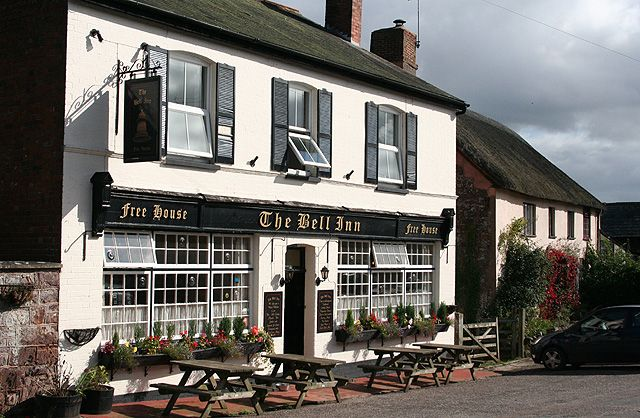
The Bell Inn, Thorverton.

The Exeter Inn on Bullen Street and the Bell Inn on Dinneford Street were built in the early 19th century. The Exeter Inn was built as 'The Wellington' (honouring the recent victory in 1815 at the Battle of Waterloo), but was known locally as 'West's House' after the owner Mr Walter Western. It was renamed 'The Exeter' on 17 December 1861 when the pub became a station for parcels to the city. The hanging sign on the front elevation denotes the City of Exeter's Coat of Arms. The pub was purchased on 1 February 1897 for the sum of £950 by Wm Hancock & Sons (Wiveliscombe) Ltd. It has been independently owned by the Mann family since just after the Second World War.

It contains a 28-foot deep well in the centre of the bar built from local stone and fed from local springs maintaining a level of 4 – 5 feet. More recently the well has been known to have been used for the cool storage of beers.

The Exeter Inn has a collection of antique firearms on its walls; a collection started by Jack Mann and continued by the current landlord.

The Bell Inn was rebuilt entirely after fire destroyed its earlier incarnation but has now closed for business. Its name is derived from its position opposite Thorverton Church.

Of the 'lost' inns, the 'Royal Oak' was situated at the junction of Bullen Street and The Bury, where Berry House now stands. The name was applied after the Restoration of Charles II to commemorate his flight during the Civil War. It is likely that its name prior to that was The Cornish Chough. The fifth inn in the village was located east of the Thorverton Arms at Acorn House (now a private residence). The hatch to the beer cellar is still visible. In addition to these, there are also hints of a Stag Inn in the 18th century and a Ship Inn in the 19th century, both within The Bury.

== Sports ==
The village is home to Thorverton Cricket Club, founded in 1860. The club has over 100 members, both senior and junior. It fields two sides in the Devon Cricket League as well as various other competitions. The 1st XI will play their 2022 matches in the second tier of the DCL after promotion by winning the B Division in 2021, the 'A' Division. The cricket club has a thriving youth section, which produced first-class cricketer Giles White and current Somerset County Cricket Club player Erin Vukusic. Thorverton Football Club field two teams in the Devon and Exeter Football League.

Exeter Chiefs captain Jack Yeandle is from the village.

== Schools ==
Berry House, which now stands where the Royal Oak used to, was the home of Thomas Broom Row and before 1860 was known as Pugh's House. Mr Row was the village Vestry Clerk, accountant, insurance agent who went bankrupt in 1860. The house was subsequently converted by his wife and daughters to a Ladies Seminary, and the house was renamed Berry House in keeping with the Berry School at Silverton.

There was a substantial yeoman called Mr John Berry, who in the mid-17th century held five farms and 22 houses and cottages in the village, which he leased from the Dean and Chapter of Exeter and sub-let as an investment. Of his considerable fortune, he paid for the Berry's Bridge to be built, and provided a gift of £60 in 1618 'to be lent to poor tradesmen', thus started a long tradition of charitable commissions within the village to support poor labouring men and widows, or bread and money to be distributed at Easter.

In 1673, Thomas Adams left £100, half to be spent 'teaching poor children' and the other half to be used to distribute bread. Donations to education were a constant theme. In 1710, Margaret Tuckfield donated £30 towards providing 'Bibles and coats for poor children'.

So the village school slowly came into existence from 1673 and grew. But by 1815 there had been no further endowments since 1743, and it had become inadequate following the rise in the village population. A petition was therefore made to the court of chancery. It appealed that of the 140 poor children in the parish, only a small number could receive education.

A National School was therefore built in Thorverton in 1845 by the Rev. James Duke Coleridge, to educate 130 children. Average attendance at the school in 1893 was about 112 pupils and the school-master was John Ashton Martin. The education of children in the parish was partly supported by a small endowment from the Ecclesiastical Commissioners who were Lords of the Manor.

Thorverton also added an infants school and a boarding school around the same time.

Thorverton still has a thriving primary school located in the appropriately named School Lane. There are approximately 80 pupils.

== Churches ==
The Dean and Chapter of the cathedral in Exeter had been the lords of the manor since the days of Edward I. The Church continues to hold significant tracts of property within the village to this day. As such the village never had a squire.

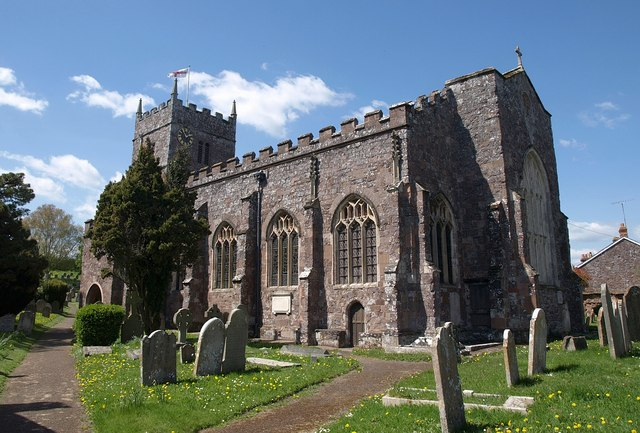
The parish church

The parish church of St Thomas Becket was rebuilt in the late 15th and early 16th centuries, although parts of it may date back to the 13th century. The church was restored in 1834 when the nave was rebuilt. The western tower contains a clock, dated 1751, and ten bells which are dated between 1662 and 1994. There are slate floor slabs to the Tuckfields of East Raddon, a hamlet one mile west of the village, where the abandoned workings of a stone quarry are still visible.

In recent times a portion of the east end of the church has been converted into a Lady Chapel and a vicars chapel occupies the space beside the organ. The north transept was also enclosed and is now used for meetings and other occasions.

There is also a Baptist church on Berrysbridge Road built in 1833–4 by the Baptists that lived in Thorverton, with John Hockin preaching the first sermons. They began with steep standards. In 1833, Mary Squire had her membership revoked due to her 'improper walk and conduct'. Another, Mrs Harris, for 'unchristian spirit' in 1837. The ancient chapel of St. John the Baptist was moved from an isolated site near Thorverton and re-erected as the cemetery chapel in 1925 to Crediton cemetery.

A Roman Catholic Chapel was located in the hamlet of Raddon, but by 1850 this had become part of a farmhouse called Chapel St. Martin.

== Damage caused by fires ==
Individual fires throughout the 19th century altered the face of Thorverton. With so many thatched cottages and the only means of light and heat being fire, it was perhaps inevitable.

Just opposite the ford, six dwellings and their outhouses were consumed in 1770, but an insurance policy with the Sun Fire Office allowed a new settlement to be built. In 1812 a destructive fire broke out at Raddon Court farm. The premises were very spacious, consisting of two dwelling-houses, large stables, barns, linhays, cider-cellars, and many outbuildings. The farm was insured in the Royal Exchange Fire-Office, but not to the full amount. In 1816, seventeen cottages on Jericho Street burned down as a result of a boy, a candle, and some straw. The Dolphin was almost completely destroyed in 1849, despite the efforts of early fire-engines from Silverton. Much of the building today dates from the rebuilding. It was the turn of the Exeter Inn in 1855. Next to the Thorverton Arms today is Leigh Gardens, developed in 1970 over the ruins of the cob and thatch Leigh House from where the saddler and the mason worked.

A fire tore across the thatched roofs of Jericho Street in 1890. Four cottages were ablaze within minutes. William Cummings (postmaster named on the blue plaque) acted quickly to summon an engine from Exeter. They used water from the nearby stream. The labourers and artisans that inhabited the houses threw their furniture into the street in desperation, but uninsured they faced destitution. The plentiful supply of water allowed the fire to be extinguished before it reached the stack of timber stored at the Waggon Works.

The cottages lining The Bury, Dinneford Street and the top end of Bullen Street were almost completely cob until the spate of fires in the 19th century. Where the tall brick buildings of Ferndale and Fairfield are now, there was until the late 1880s old cob cottages known as Elyots.

The then cobbed Bell Inn caught fire in June 1904 when a fire burned the pub, the bakery next door and the house next to that to the ground. The pub was rebuilt, but the location of the other two buildings remain empty. Recent excavation work on the garden of the modern Bell Inn revealed a layer of charred earth from the fire.

== Railway ==
Thorverton had a railway station on the Exe Valley Railway, part of the Great Western Railway, completed in May 1885. The station was located at the far end of Silver Street, about half a mile from the village. The line closed to passenger traffic in October 1963 as a result of the Beeching Axe, though the part of the line to Stoke Canon remained in use until 1966 for the transport of grain. Both the station and the stationmaster's house remain in use as houses. The line crossed Silver Street on a bridge, now removed, although the bridge abutments have been removed the embankments are clearly visible on either side of the road.

== Street names ==
Street names did not take a firm hold in Thorverton until the second half of the 18th century. The names are:

- Bullen Street was named from Bullen's Orchard, which was located where Bullens Close now stands. It is most likely that the orchard was owned by a gentleman of, or approximating, that name.
- Silver Street is simply a shortening of Silverton Street.
- Milfords Lane, which takes a dog-legged route through the ford received its name from the well-known local family of Milfords which have played an integral part in the history of the village.
- The Bury comes from the Saxon word burgh for fortified enclosure.
- Dinneford means hidden ford and refers to the stream that crosses the road here, now bridged.
- Dark Lane, which links Dinneford Street with Bullen Street at Crossways was so known in the village before parish registers included addresses in 1840.
- School Lane was previously known as Vicarage Lane, the vicarage being along this street still to this day. Nothing more than a nameplate put in place by the District Council introduced this change.
- There used to be houses running from the church to Dark Lane, before the churchyard was extended, that are no longer there. The path that ran alongside them was known as Castle Hill.
- Cleaves Close, built in 1952, was built on a field in the Cleaves estate named originally after Henry Clyve of 1569. Contemporaries of Henry Clyve included a Mr Barlebyn and Mr Retcliffe - other names lent to properties within Thorverton. Bullens Orchard, on which Bullens Close was built in the 1970s, was also part of the Cleaves estate.
- Broadlands has no historic significance to the estate built on what was Burt's and Milford's estates.
- The Glebe was developed (in 1979) on the grounds of the former vicarage, hence the name (see glebe).

== Sources ==
- Stoyle, Ian (1993). Thorverton Devon. Thorverton. Devon: self-published.
