= Morebath Junction railway station =

Former railway station in England

Morebath Junction Halt
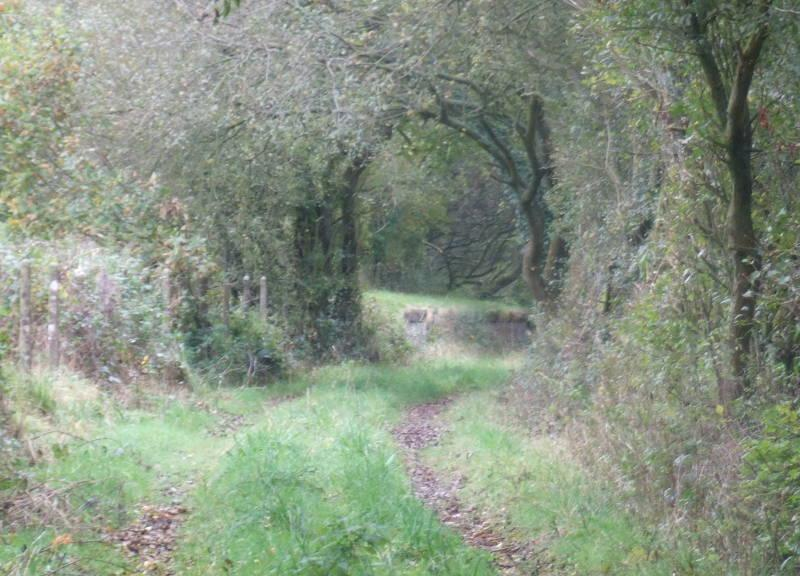
- Site of Morebath Junction Halt in October 2007

General information
- Location: Morebath, Devon; England
- Coordinates: 51.0118°N 3.4955°W
- Grid reference: SS951246
- Platforms: 1

Other information
- Status: Disused

History
- Post-grouping: Great Western Railway

Key dates
- 1884: Junction and signal box opened
- 1928: Halt opened
- 1963: Exe Valley Railway closed
- 1966: Halt and Devon and Somerset Railway closed
Location

Morebath Junction Halt was a railway halt near Morebath in Devon, England. It opened in 1928 and closed in 1966, serving trains on the routes between Taunton and Barnstaple Victoria Road, and between Exeter St Davids and Dulverton.

== History ==
The Devon and Somerset Railway (D&SR) opened through Morebath on 1 November 1873, connecting Taunton with Barnstaple. It later became part of the Great Western Railway (GWR). The GWR opened the Tiverton and North Devon Railway between Tiverton and Dulverton on the D&SR line on 1 August 1884, the junction between the two lines being west of the station at Morebath.

There was a signal box and passing loop at the junction but no station until 1 December 1928 when a platform was provided by the GWR.

British Railways withdrew services from the Exe Valley line on 7 October 1963. The signal box was retained until 29 April 1964 when the passing loop was removed. Final closure came on 3 October 1966 when services were withdrawn from the Devon and Somerset line.

== Description ==
The halt was located at milepost 182 1/2 (293.7 km), which was measured from London Paddington. It had a single platform on the north side of the track. The platform was 100 ft (30 m) long and 8 ft (2.4 m) wide. It was first built from old railway sleepers but was later rebuilt with concrete blocks. There was a small waiting shelter and two hurricane lamps mounted on lamp posts.

Morebath Junction Halt was much nearer Morebath village than the original station, but was accessible only by a footpath alongside the railway from a famers crossing or on across a field. It's recorded that passengers walking to the halt changed into ordinary shoes at the halt, storing their muddy boots under the bench in the shelter until their return.

== Signalling ==
There was a signal box on the north side of the line at the junction. It had 19 levers but the lever frame was replaced in 1937, the new one having 23 levers.

Although the routes either side of the junction had only a single track, two tracks were provided on both of the routes through the junction itself which allowed two trains to pass. The one on the Taunton route was 600 ft (180 m) long but extended 792 ft (241 m) in 1937. The double track on the Tiverton line extended 225 ft (69 m) south of the junction.

Morebath Junction was the only location in Britain to have had a signalwoman in the 19th century. Mrs Town was appointed in 1890. The Railway Magazine reported in October 1913 that she was "very proud" of her job after 23 years' service and hoped to continue indefinitely.

== Services ==
Trains on both lines called at Morebath Junction Halt, giving it a more frequent service than Morebath railway station on the Devon and Somerset line 1 mile 36 chains (2.3 km) to the east which could only be served by trains on the Taunton route.

Preceding station	Disused railways	Following station
Morebath	Great Western Railway (Taunton – Barnstaple	Dulverton
Bampton	Great Western Railway (Exeter – Dulverton)	Dulverton
