= Hundred of Kingsbury =

Historical Hundred of Somerset, England

Kingsbury Hundred
- Area
- 36,690 acres (14,850 ha)
- Status: Hundred
  - HQ: Kingsbury Episcopi
- Subdivisions
  - Type: Parishes
  - Units: Chard, Combe St Nicholas, Huish Episcopi, Kingsbury Episcopi, Winsham, Ash Priors, West Buckland, Fitzhead, Bishops Lydeard, Wellington, and Wiveliscombe

The Hundred of Kingsbury is one of the 40 historical Hundreds in the ceremonial county of Somerset, England, dating from before the Norman conquest during the Anglo-Saxon era although exact dates are unknown. Each hundred had a 'fyrd', which acted as the local defence force and a court which was responsible for the maintenance of the frankpledge system. They also formed a unit for the collection of taxes. The role of the hundred court was described in the Dooms (laws) of King Edgar. The name of the hundred was normally that of its meeting-place.

The Hundred of Kingsbury which was originally called Cingesberia, consisted of six separate areas covering the ancient parishes of: Chard, Combe St Nicholas, Huish Episcopi, Kingsbury Episcopi, Winsham, Ash Priors, West Buckland, Fitzhead, Bishops Lydeard, Wellington, and Wiveliscombe. It covered an area of 36,690 acres (14,850 ha).

At some point in the 16th century it was two separate Hundreds: Kingsbury West and East Kingsbury. In 1663 it was recorded as having originally being a gift from Ine of Wessex to the Cathedral Church of Wells prior to 1066.

The importance of the hundred courts declined from the seventeenth century. By the 19th century several different single-purpose subdivisions of counties, such as poor law unions, sanitary districts, and highway districts sprang up, filling the administrative role previously played by parishes and hundreds. Although the Hundreds have never been formally abolished, their functions ended with the establishment of county courts in 1867 and the introduction of districts by the Local Government Act 1894.
