= Cove, Devon =

Village in Devon, England

Coordinates: 50.966210°N 3.49541°W

Cove
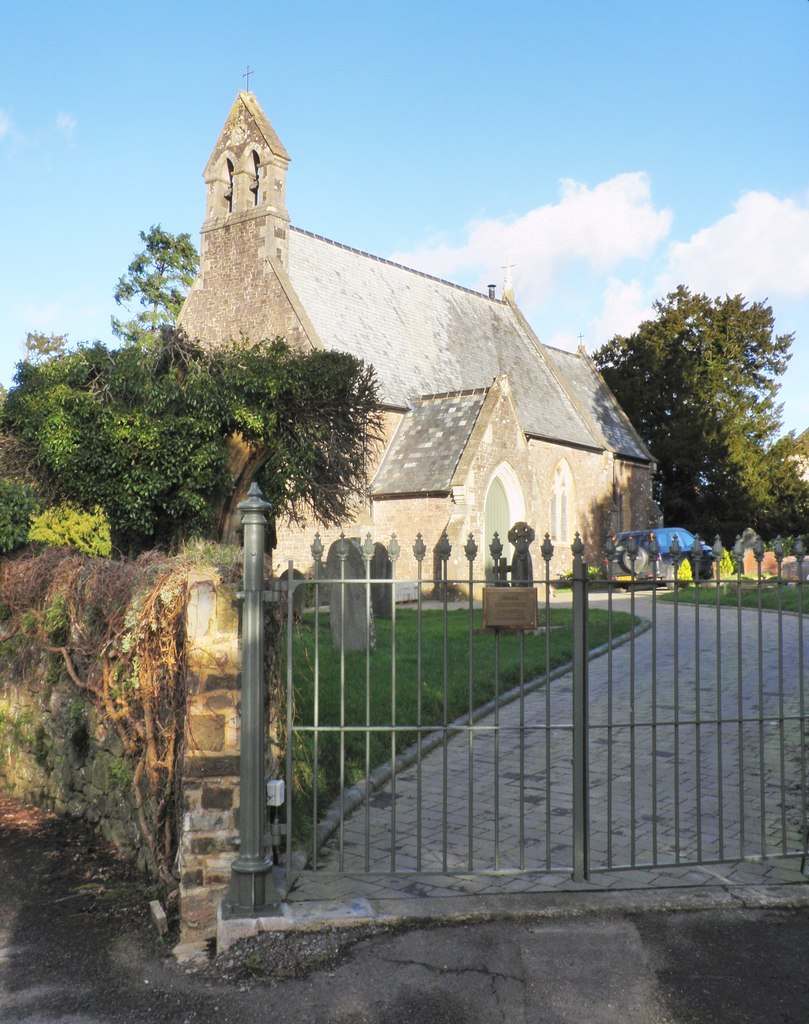
- The former church

- Location within Devon
- OS grid reference: SS9508719597
- Civil parish: Tiverton
- District: Mid Devon
- Shire county: Devon
- Region: South West
- Country: England
- Sovereign state: United Kingdom
- Post town: TIVERTON
- Postcode district: EX16 7
- Dialling code: 01398
- Police: Devon and Cornwall
- Fire: Devon and Somerset
- Ambulance: South Western
- UK Parliament: Tiverton and Minehead

Cove is a small village in the county of Devon, England. It is 4 miles north of Tiverton and 2 miles from Bampton in the Exe Valley some 450 feet above sea level. Cove was formed into an ecclesiastical parish in 1886. The church of St. John the Baptist, erected in 1856 on the site of an earlier building, is a stone building in the plain Gothic style consisting of chancel, nave and vestry. Services ceased in 1987 and the building and former churchyard are now a private residence. The register dates from the years 1680 to 1987. The Exe Valley Railway used to run through the village and you can still see the platform and old station house which is currently lived in.

The manor of Cove was acquired in 1763 by Robert Row of Livingshayes, Silverton, from Thomas Carew of Crowcombe, Somerset. Cove House, erected in 1800, is a pillared Bath stone mansion, standing on an elevated plateau, surrounded by park land and woodland with panoramic views of the valley.

The Cove Estate, along with the fishing rights, was sold in 1922 by the North-Row family and gave many tenants the opportunity to acquire the freehold of their properties.
