= Exe Valley Railway =

Branch line in Devon, England

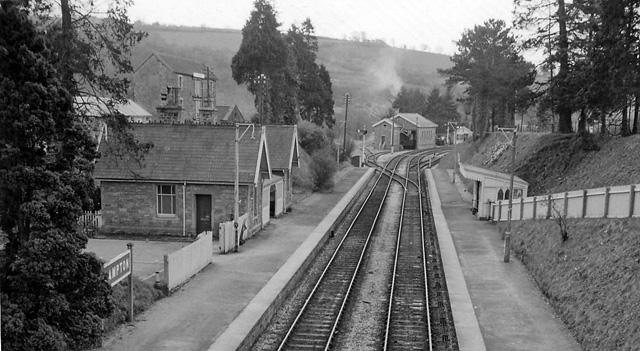
- Bampton station

Overview
- Status: Closed
- Owner: Great Western Railway
- Locale: Devon
- Termini: Morebath Junction; Stoke Canon

History
- Opened: 1 August 1884
- Closed: 7 October 1963

Technical
- Line length: 19.16 miles (30.84 km)
- Number of tracks: 1
- Track gauge: 4 ft 8 1/2 in (1,435 mm)

The Exe Valley Railway was a branch line built by the Great Western Railway (GWR) in Devon, England, to link its Bristol to Exeter line with its Devon and Somerset Railway (D&SR), thereby connecting Exeter with Dulverton (which is in Somerset). The line was in use from 1884 until 1964.

== History ==
Tiverton and North Devon Railway Act 1875
- Act of Parliament
- Parliament of the United Kingdom
- Long title: An Act for the construction of a Railway from Tiverton to the Devon and Somerset Railway at or near Morebath, in the county of Devon; and for other purposes.
- Citation: 38 & 39 Vict. c. clxv

Dates
- Royal assent: 19 July 1875

The first part of the line to be built was the Tiverton and North Devon Railway, which ran from the D&SR at Morebath Junction south to Tiverton. It was authorised by the Tiverton and North Devon Railway Act 1875 (38 & 39 Vict. c. clxv) and opened on 1 August 1884. The Exe Valley Railway itself started from the Exeter main line at Stoke Canon and ran northwards to Tiverton. This opened on 1 May 1885.

Services generally ran through from Dulverton to Exeter St Davids. Trains could not stop at Stoke Canon station as the junction was built south of the station which had been opened on the main line in 1852. This was rectified in 1894 when a new station was built to the south of the junction. As with Stoke Canon, trains could not call at Morebath as the station was on the wrong side of the junction, but in 1928 a station was opened at the junction.

In 1890, Mrs Towns was appointed signalwoman at Morebath Junction. She is the only recorded example of a signalwoman on any railway in Britain in the 19th century. In October 1913, The Railway Magazine reported that she was "very proud" of her job after 23 years service and hoped to continue indefinitely.

On 1 January 1948, the GWR was nationalised to become the Western Region of British Railways. Stoke Canon station closed in 1960 and passenger trains were withdrawn from the line from 7 October 1963, although goods trains continued to run to Thorverton until 4 May 1964.

== Stations ==
The stations are described from north to south. They all closed on 7 October 1963 unless stated otherwise.

=== Bampton ===
Bampton station opened on 1 August 1884 on the west side of Bampton. South West England. It was a passing place so had two platforms for passengers and also a goods shed. It dispatched a lot of stone from local quarries. It was renamed "Bampton (Devon)" in June 1911 to avoid confusion with another GWR Bampton station in Oxfordshire. After the line closed the station was demolished, and the cutting in which it was situated was largely filled in.

=== Cove Halt ===
This was the first of the small stations that were opened along the line during the 1920s. A siding had been provided when the line opened near the level crossing in the village of Cove, and a simple platform with a corrugated iron pagoda shelter was opened for passengers on 9 June 1924. The level crossing keeper had a cottage and small signal cabin, both of which have survived as a house.

=== Bolham Halt ===
Another small station, this concrete platform was opened on 23 April 1928. It had a corrugated iron shelter with a simple sloping roof. It served the village of Bolham.

=== Tiverton ===
The station at Tiverton opened in 1848 as the terminus station of a broad gauge branch line from the Bristol and Exeter main line at Tiverton Junction. It was reconstructed with extra platforms in the 1880s to accommodate the Exe Valley trains.

After the closure of the Stoke Canon to Morebath line, Tiverton continued to be served from Tiverton Junction until 5 October 1964 (passengers) and 5 June 1967 (goods).

=== West Exe Halt ===
This station was opened on 19 March 1928 to serve the western side of Tiverton and Heathcoat's Mill, a major employer in the town. It was equipped with a wooden shelter, and the original 109 feet (33 m) platform was almost doubled in length in May 1937. It was generally unstaffed, but at busy times a porter was sometimes sent from Tiverton to collect and sell tickets.

=== Cadeleigh ===
This station opened on 1 May 1885 to serve the villages of Cadeleigh and Bickleigh and was therefore known as 'Cadeleigh and Bickleigh' until 1 May 1906 when it was changed to just 'Cadeleigh'. As a passing place it had two platforms and also a busy goods yard. After the railway was closed it was used by the county council, but in 1997 it was sold and is now used as the Devon Railway Centre.

=== Burn Halt ===
This small platform with a wooden shelter was opened on 26 January 1929 to serve Burn Farm and the parish of Butterleigh.

=== Up Exe ===
When the line opened in 1885 a platform was provided on the east side of the track near the hamlet of Up Exe with the name 'Up Exe and Silverton', although a Silverton railway station already existed on the Bristol to Exeter line to serve that village. From 1 May 1905 the Exe Valley station was renamed 'Up Exe'. It was provided with a small stone building for passenger use and a house for the station master, although it never had a goods yard. A small signal box was provided next to the level crossing.

From 1 October 1923 the staff were withdrawn from the station and it was designated 'Up Exe Halt'. The station master's house was then used by the level crossing keeper, and the station buildings became a house while the passengers were given a small iron shelter. Both of the houses remained in use as such after the closure of the line.

=== Thorverton ===
The station serving Thorverton village opened with the railway in 1885. Two platforms were provided as it was a passing place. The main building was on the southbound side, whilst the goods yard was located on the northbound side. A wooden shelter attached to one wall of the goods shed was provided on the northbound platform for passengers travelling towards Tiverton. The goods yard was provided with a coal siding, a goods shed, crane and cattle dock. The station master had a house to the north of the station. The village was not on a main road and had no bus service with the result that the station was one of the best-used on the line and also generated a lot of freight due to nearby Thorverton Mill, a watermill that was connected to the station by a siding. Camp coaches were based here from 1936 to 1939 which provided accommodation for holiday visitors.

Thorverton closed to passenger traffic with the rest of the Exe Valley line on 7 October 1963. Goods traffic ceased on 4 May 1964. Both the station and the stationmaster's house remain in use as houses, the former extended using stone from the demolished goods shed.

=== Brampford Speke ===
The station at Brampford Speke was a single platform on the west side of the line that opened with the line in 1885. Unusually there was no road access, passengers reached the station via a footpath from the village. It was provided with the usual building for passengers and a house for the station master. It had a signal box until 1907 but never any goods yard. It was closed for the whole of 1917 and 1918 as a wartime economy measure. From 1 October 1923 the staff were withdrawn and the station designated 'Brampford Speke Halt'. As at Up Exe, the station building became a house and passengers used an iron shelter instead. Both this and the station master's house continue to be used as private houses. As of 2021-07-05, this was listed as on sale, and the original station can still be clearly distinguished.

== Services ==
This example timetable shows the weekday passenger services in October 1920 (there was no service on Sundays).

Down trains					Up trains				
Dulverton	09:05	12:15	17:10	19:20	Exeter St Davids	07:40	10:40	15:45	18:00
Bampton	09:17	12:26	17:21	19:42	Stoke Canon	07:48	10:48	15:53	18:08
Tiverton	09:32	12:40	17:37	19:57	Brampford Speke	–	10:52	15:57	18:12
Cadeleigh	09:41	12:49	17:46	20:06	Thorverton	07:55	10:58	16:03	18:18
Up Exe	09:49	12:57	17:54	20:14	Up Exe	07:58	11:01	16:06	18:21
Thorverton	09:52	13:00	17:58	20:18	Cadeleigh	08:07	11:10	16:15	18:30
Brampford Speke	09:57	13:05	18:02	–	Tiverton	08:18	11:22	16:25	18:41
Stoke Canon	10:03	13:12	18:09	20:20	Bampton	08:32	11:38	16:40	18:55
Exeter St Davids	10:10	13:20	18:17	20:37	Dulverton	08:42	11:48	16:50	19:05

== Bibliography ==
- Crump, Amyas (2010). The Tiverton Museum Railway Collection. Southampton: Kevin Robertson. ISBN 978-1-906419-39-4.
- Oakley, Mike (2007). Devon Railway Stations. Wimbourne: The Dovecote Press. ISBN 978-1-904349-55-6.
- MacDermot, E T (1931). History of the Great Western Railway. Vol. 2 (1863-1921) (1 ed.). London: Great Western Railway.
- Wojtczak, Helena (2005). Railwaywomen: Exploitation, Betrayal and Triumph in the Workplace. Hastings: Hastings Press. ISBN 1-904109-04-7.
