= Devon and Somerset Railway =

Former railway line in England

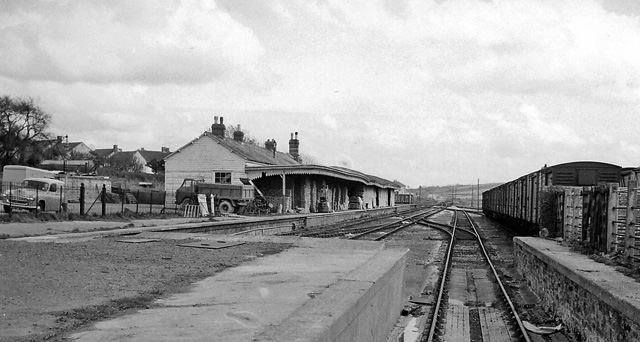
- Barnstaple station in 1964

Overview
- Status: Closed
- Locale: Devon and Somerset
- Termini: Norton Fitzwarren; Barnstaple

History
- Opened: 1871
- Closed: 1966

Technical
- Line length: 43 miles (69 km)
- Number of tracks: 1
- Track gauge: 4 ft 8 1/2 in (1,435 mm) standard gauge
- Old gauge: 7 ft 1/4 in (2,140 mm) until 1881

The Devon and Somerset Railway (D&SR) was a cross-country line that connected Barnstaple in Devon, England, to the network of the Bristol and Exeter Railway (B&ER) near Taunton. It was opened in stages between 1871 and 1873 and closed in 1966. It served a mostly rural area although it carried some through services from east of Taunton to the seaside resort of Ilfracombe.

From 1988 onwards the route of the line west of South Molton was redeveloped to form the part of the North Devon Link Road.

== History ==
Devon and Somerset Railway Act 1864
- Act of Parliament
- Parliament of the United Kingdom
- Long title: An Act for making a Railway from the Bristol and Exeter Railway to Barnstaple; and for other Purposes.
- Citation: 27 & 28 Vict. c. cccvii

Dates
- Royal assent: 29 July 1864

Text of statute as originally enacted

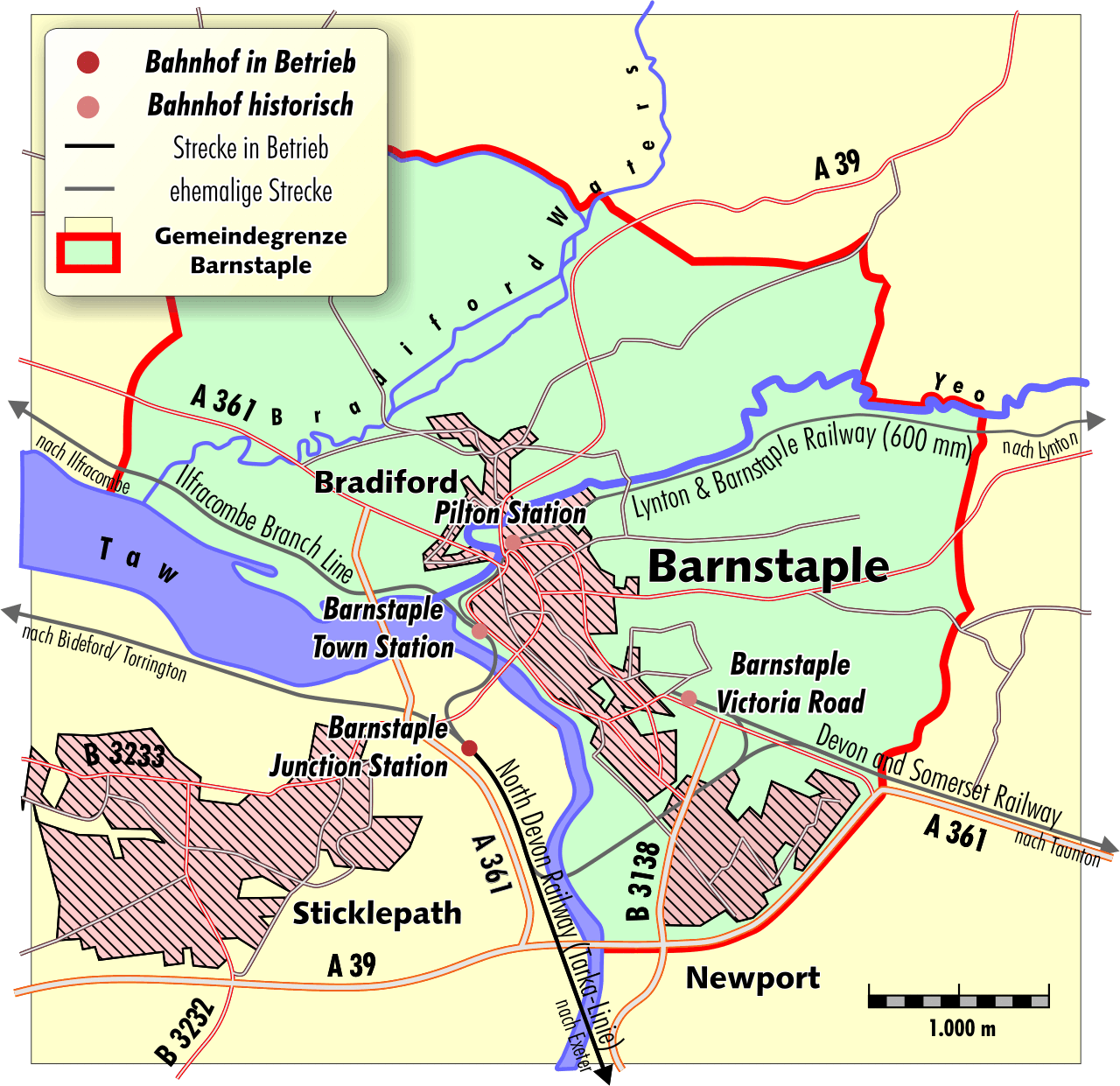
Railways around Barnstaple: Black lines: in use; Grey lines: closed and lifted

The Devon and Somerset Railway Act 1864 (27 & 28 Vict. c. cccvii), that authorised the railway, received assent on 29 July 1864. Eugenius Birch was appointed as Engineer, but he was replaced by Richard Hassard in 1870. The first 7 1/4-mile (11.7 km) section of the line was opened on 8 June 1871, from Watchet Junction (later Norton Fitzwarren) to Wiveliscombe on the edge of Exmoor. The remaining 35 3/4 miles (57.5 km) to Barnstaple opened on 1 November 1873. The line used its own station at Barnstaple (later to be named Victoria Road), some distance from the rival station at Barnstaple Quay.

The line was built as 7 ft 1/4 in (2,140 mm) broad gauge and operated by the B&ER. The last broad gauge train ran on 14 May 1881, after which the line was converted to 4 ft 8 1/2 in (1,435 mm) standard gauge and reopened on 18 May.

In 1884 the Tiverton and North Devon Railway opened from a junction on the D&SR to Tiverton. The Tiverton services started from Dulverton and ran over the D&SR as far as Morebath Junction where they diverged southwards, and that line was later extended to Exeter.

In 1890 the GWR appointed a Mrs Towns as signalwoman at Morebath Junction. She is the only recorded example of a signalwoman on any railway in Britain in the 19th century. In October 1913 The Railway Magazine reported that she was "very proud" of her job after 23 years service and hoped to continue indefinitely.

Conversion to standard gauge enabled a connection to the London and South Western Railway at Barnstaple. This was opened on 1 June 1887, after which GWR trains ran through to Ilfracombe via Barnstaple and the LSWR.

The GWR acquired the Devon and Somerset Railway by the Great Western Railway Act 1901 (1 Edw. 7. c. cxxiii). On 1 July 1905 an avoiding line was opened at Barnstaple, which allowed through trains to Ilfracombe to run directly to the LSWR station without having to reverse in the D&SR terminus. During the 1930s the line carried heavy traffic on summer weekends and automatic token equipment was installed to allow trains to pass token exchange points at higher speeds.

In 1937 the junction at Norton Fitwarren was modified to allow an easier route from the main line, and the single track as far as Milverton was doubled.

On 1 January 1948 the GWR was nationalised to become part of British Railways. The D&SR station was named Barnstaple Victoria Road from 26 September 1949 to distinguish it from Barnstaple Junction and Barnstaple Town railway stations, the former Southern Railway stations. Victoria Road station closed to passengers on 12 June 1960, after which all through trains ran directly to Barnstaple Junction. On 1 October 1966 the last train ran on the line; Victoria Road remained open for freight traffic, served from Barnstaple Junction, until 30 May 1970.

== Engineering ==
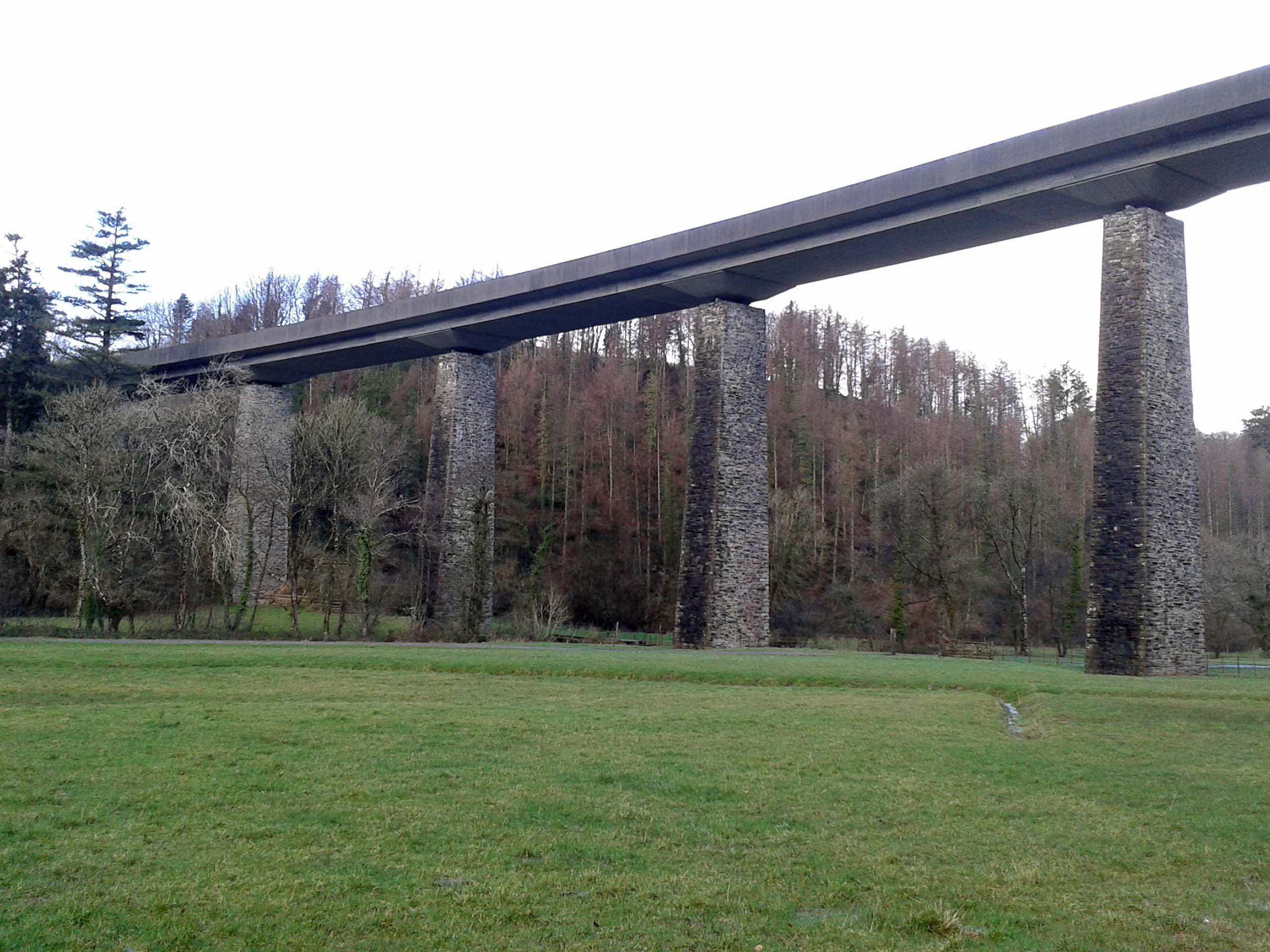
The pillars of Castle Hill Viaduct have been reused for the North Devon Link road (A361)

The line featured steep gradients; 16.75 miles (26.96 km) were at 1 in 60 (1.7%) or steeper, and much of the rest was steeper than 1 in 140 (0.7%). The principal engineering works on the railway were:

- Waterrow Viaduct, Venn Cross: a wrought iron viaduct 162 yards (148 m) long and 101 feet (31 m) above the valley floor
- Castle Hill (or Filleigh) Viaduct, Filleigh, a stone-pillared cast-iron viaduct 232 yards long and 94 feet (29 m) high. The pillars have been reused for the North Devon Link road.
- Bathealton Tunnel, 440 yards (400 m) long
- Venn Cross Tunnel, 246 yards (225 m) long
- Nightcote Tunnel, 44 yards (40 m) long, near Dulverton (Note: The 1:10560 scale Ordnance Survey (OS) map of 1884 calls Nightcote Tunnel "Knackershole Tunnel" after the adjacent location called "Knacker's Hole". Some parliamentary papers refer to Nightcote Tunnel and the map shows East and West Nightcott on the opposite side of the railway line. The 1905 1:10560 OS map still shows "Knackershole Tunnel" even though "Knacker's Hole" itself is now shown as "West Knowle".)
- Castle Hill Tunnel, 317 yards (290 m) long

== Stations ==
The first section of the line from a junction west of Taunton to Wiveliscombe opened on 8 June 1871; there was one intermediate station, at Milverton. A station was opened at the junction on the main line on 1 June 1873; it was named at Norton Fitzwarren. The section from Wiveliscombe to Barnstaple opened on 1 November 1873 with nine new stations, but two more were added later, one in 1928 and the other in 1932.

The stations are described here from east to west. Unless otherwise stated, each opened with its respective section of line; goods services were withdrawn from 6 July 1964, and the stations closed after the passage of the last passenger train on 1 October 1966.

=== Norton Fitzwarren ===
The Bristol and Exeter Railway (B&ER) was opened through Norton Fitzwarren, 2 miles (3 km) west of Taunton, in 1843. The West Somerset Railway (WSR) was opened from Norton Junction to Watchet in 1862, and when the D&SR opened in 1871 it made a connection to the WSR just west of the original Norton Junction. A station was opened on the main line on the east side of the junction on 1 June 1873 to serve all three routes. On 7 February 1937 the connection to the D&SR was moved from the WSR to its own junction direct to the main line, and the line was doubled as far as Milverton.

The station was closed for passenger traffic on 30 October 1961, and public goods traffic on 6 July 1964.

=== Milverton ===
The station at Milverton in Somerset was initially just a single platform on the south side of the line with a brick building. A passing loop and second platform were installed in 1880; the line east to Norton Fitzwarren was doubled on 7 February 1937. The station had a signal box on the westbound platform and a small goods yard to the west of the station on the same side of the line. Goods traffic was withdrawn from 30 September 1963. The route of the line to the west is now part of the B3227 road. Small traces remains of the station a staircase down off the original platform.

=== Wiveliscombe ===
Wiveliscombe station was in Somerset and acted as the temporary terminus of the line from 8 June 1871 until 1 November 1873. During this time it had a turntable for turning the locomotives, but this was moved to Barnstaple when the line was extended there. Trains could pass at Wiveliscombe and two platforms were provided. The main stone-built offices and signal box were on the eastbound platform while a waiting shelter was provided on the opposite platform. The goods yard and brick goods shed were behind the station buildings and accessed from the line to the east of the station. Goods traffic ceased from 6 July 1964. The main station building and goods shed remain as part of an industrial estate that has built up on the site.

=== Venn Cross ===
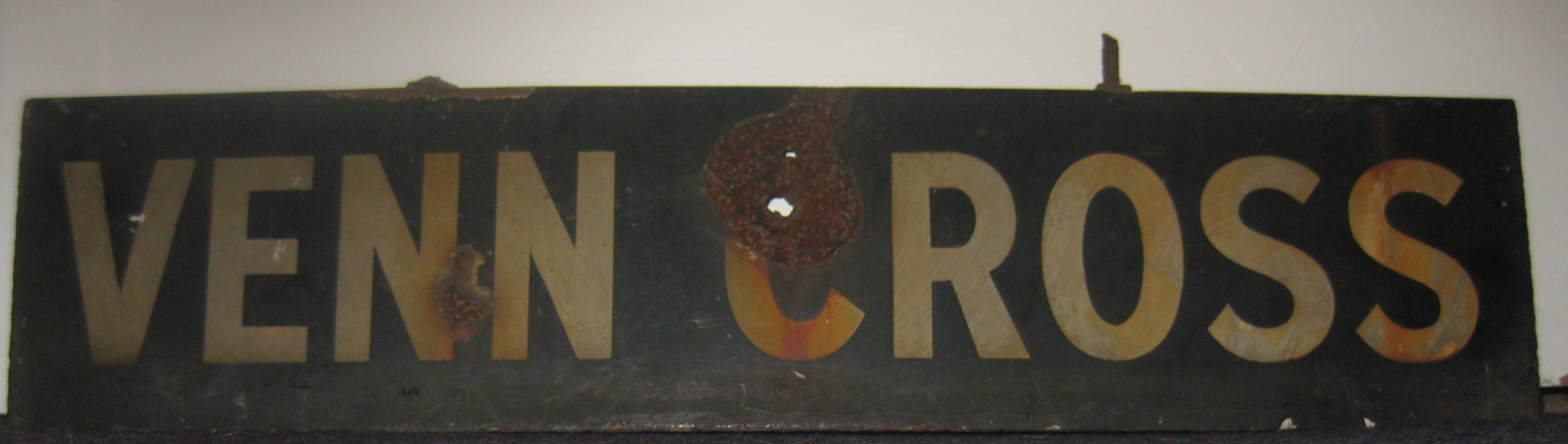

A single platform and siding were provided on the southern side of the line at the western end of the Venn Cross tunnel. The station's location, in a cutting 666 feet (203 m) above sea level, meant that it was prone to being blocked by snow. One of the signals was of a special design with a central pivot to allow it to be seen through Venn Cross tunnel. A crossing loop was installed with a second platform in February 1905. The station had a signal box on the westbound platform. The goods shed and the western end of the platforms were in Devon, while the main station buildings were in Somerset. Goods traffic was withdrawn from 30 September 1963. The station building and the station master's house are still in residential use and the goods shed has also been converted into a house. Some GWR railings and signals remain nearby.

=== Morebath ===
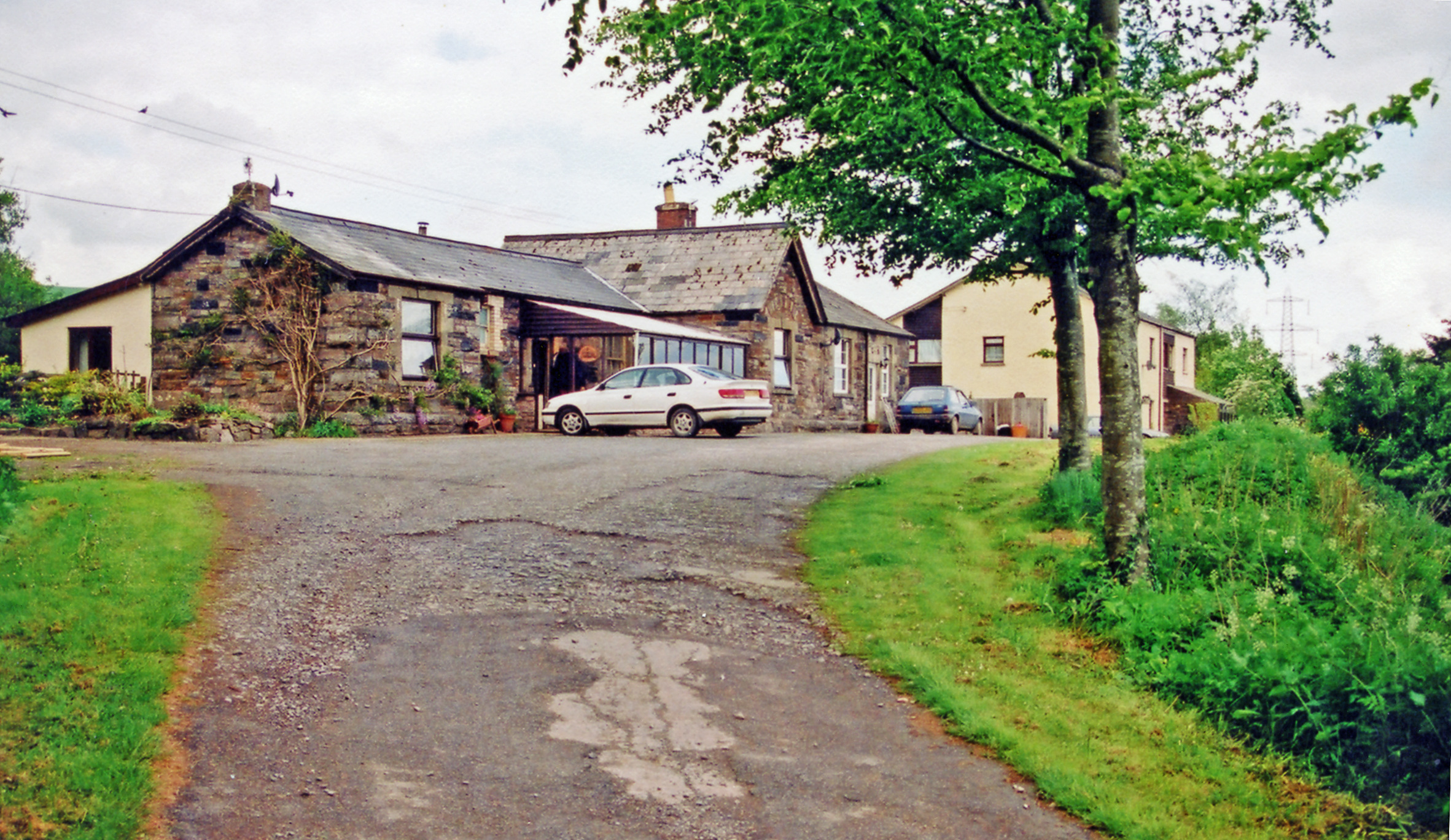
View in 2001 NE on station approach road, towards Taunton

The next station was two miles east of the village of Morebath in Devon. When opened it was known as 'Morebath and Bampton', but from 1 August 1884 Bampton was served by its own station on the new Tiverton and North Devon Railway and the D&SR station became just 'Morebath'. The station originally had a single platform on the south side of the line, but a second track and platform were added in 1876. The loop was lengthened westwards from 6 June 1937 and the platforms were extended in wood. The goods yard was to the south of the original platform and accessed from the eastern end. The 1876 signal box was on the north side of the line at the west end of the station, but a new box was provided as part of the 1937 alterations and situated at the west end of the main station building on the south side of the line. The goods yard was closed from 3 June 1963 and the passing loop and signal box were taken out of use at the same time. The station building and goods shed are both now used as houses.

=== Morebath Junction Halt ===
The Tiverton line joined the D&SR at Morebath Junction but its trains continued to Dulverton, the next station towards Barnstaple. A small, unstaffed station was opened at the junction on 1 December 1928. Trains on both lines called there, so it had a more frequent service than at Morebath station, and the halt was much nearer the village, but could be reached only by an often muddy footpath across fields.

=== Dulverton ===
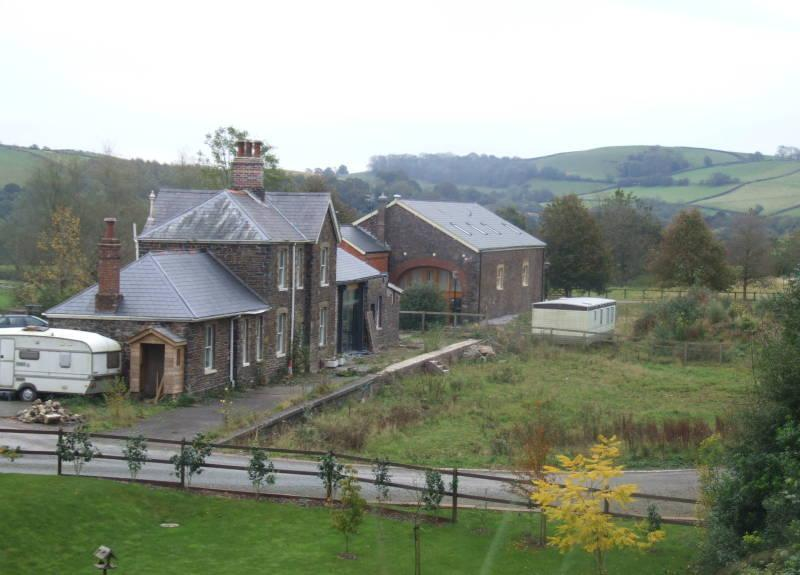
Dulverton station as it is today

This the largest intermediate station on the Devon and Somerset line was situated about two miles south of the town it served, to which it was connected by bus for many years. It was also close to the small village of Brushford. Although it was in Somerset, the stations on either side were in Devon. From 1 August 1884 it was also the terminus of trains to Tiverton which from 1 May 1885 ran through to Exeter St Davids.

Dulverton was a passing place for trains from the outset. The main buildings, including a house for the station master, were on the eastbound platform. This was connected by a covered footbridge to the westbound platform. A second track was added on the south side for the Tiverton service in 1902; initially a terminal track, it became a loop line in 1910. The goods shed was in a small yard on the north side of the line, but further sidings were added on the south side of the station, where there was also a small turntable. The first signal box was at the west end of the south-side sidings; it was replaced in 1908 by one on the eastbound platform next to the goods shed. Goods traffic ceased from 6 July 1964. The signal box was closed on 31 July 1966 and the old eastbound platform was then used for trains in both directions for the remaining two months before the line closed. The station buildings survived as part of the Caernarvon Arms Hotel.

=== East Anstey ===
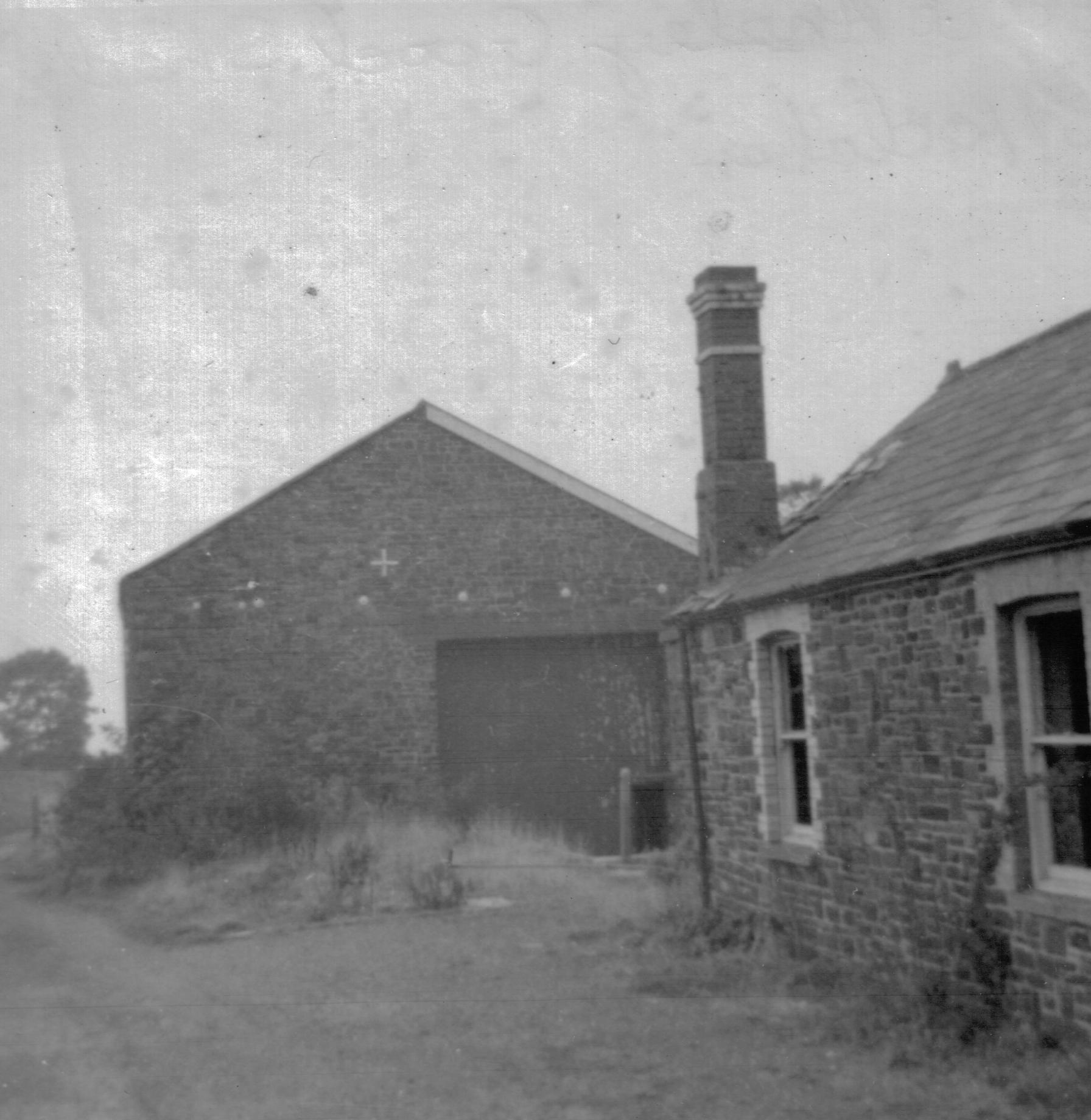
East Anstey goods shed in 1969

The station at East Anstey in Devon was built with just a single platform on the south side of the line. A passing loop and second platform were brought into use in 1876 and extended in 1910 and again in 1937. It is the highest point of the D&SR line, nearly 800 feet (240 m) above sea level. The goods shed and small goods yard were at the west end of the platform. A crossing loop was installed with a second platform in 1876, the signal box being built on the original platform.

The station was used as a location setting for the Ealing Studios 1944 film The Halfway House.

The station was host to a GWR camp coach from 1936 to 1939. A camping coach was also positioned here by the Western Region in 1952, 1953 and 1955.

Goods traffic ceased from 30 September 1963. Both the station building and the goods shed have been converted into houses.

=== Yeo Mill Halt ===
Yeo Mill Halt the last station to be built on the D&SR route, opening on 27 June 1932. It had a single wooden platform and waiting shelter on the north side of the single track. It was unstaffed and managed from East Anstey station, 1 1/2 miles (2.4 km) to the east. It was demolished after the line was closed.

=== Bishops Nympton and Molland ===
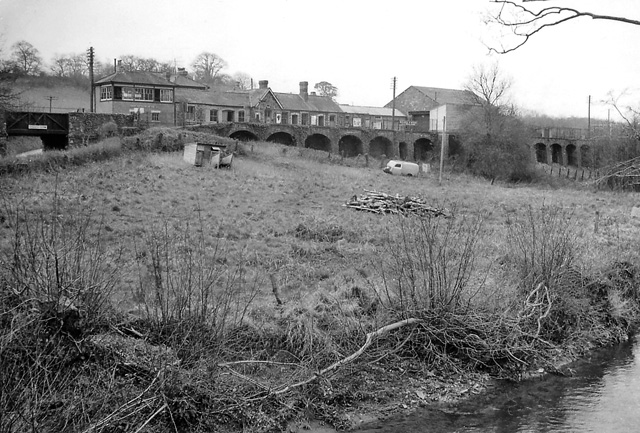
Bishop's Nympton and Molland in 1964

A single platform was provided on the south side of the line two miles south-west of the village of Molland in Devon. A passing loop and second platform were added in 1876. From March 1876 the name was changed from 'Molland' to 'Bishops Nympton and Molland'; the village of Bishops Nympton was three miles south-west of the station.

A small goods yard with a goods shed was provided on the south side of the station, with rail access from the west end. The signal box was on the south side of the line, initially towards the east end of the platform. In 1902 the loop and platforms were lengthened westwards and a new signal box was provided in the goods yard. The loop was again extended in 1937, this time eastwards, and a larger signal box was built at the east end of the platform.

Goods traffic was retained until 3 August 1964. Since being closed both the station building and the goods shed have been converted into houses and the eastbound platform remains within the station house's garden.

=== South Molton ===
The passing loop at South Molton in Devon was the most westerly passing place on the D&SR line when it opened. Being close to the town centre it was much more convenient than South Molton Road which had opened on the North Devon Railway in 1854 but was 8 miles (13 km) away. The station had a large building on the westbound platform comprising a station master's house and waiting rooms, a booking hall and offices. The up platform had only a small wooden shelter and there was no footbridge. There was also a goods yard to the west of the station, with a 60-foot (18 m) goods shed and cranes. The passing loop was lengthened eastwards in 1907 and westward in 1937. The signal box was on the westbound platform, initially at the west end but this was replaced by one at the east end.

Goods traffic was withdrawn on 3 August 1964; the former goods shed is in industrial use. The station building survived until about 2003 but was then demolished. The railway route west of this point now forms the majority part of the North Devon Link Road.

=== Filleigh ===
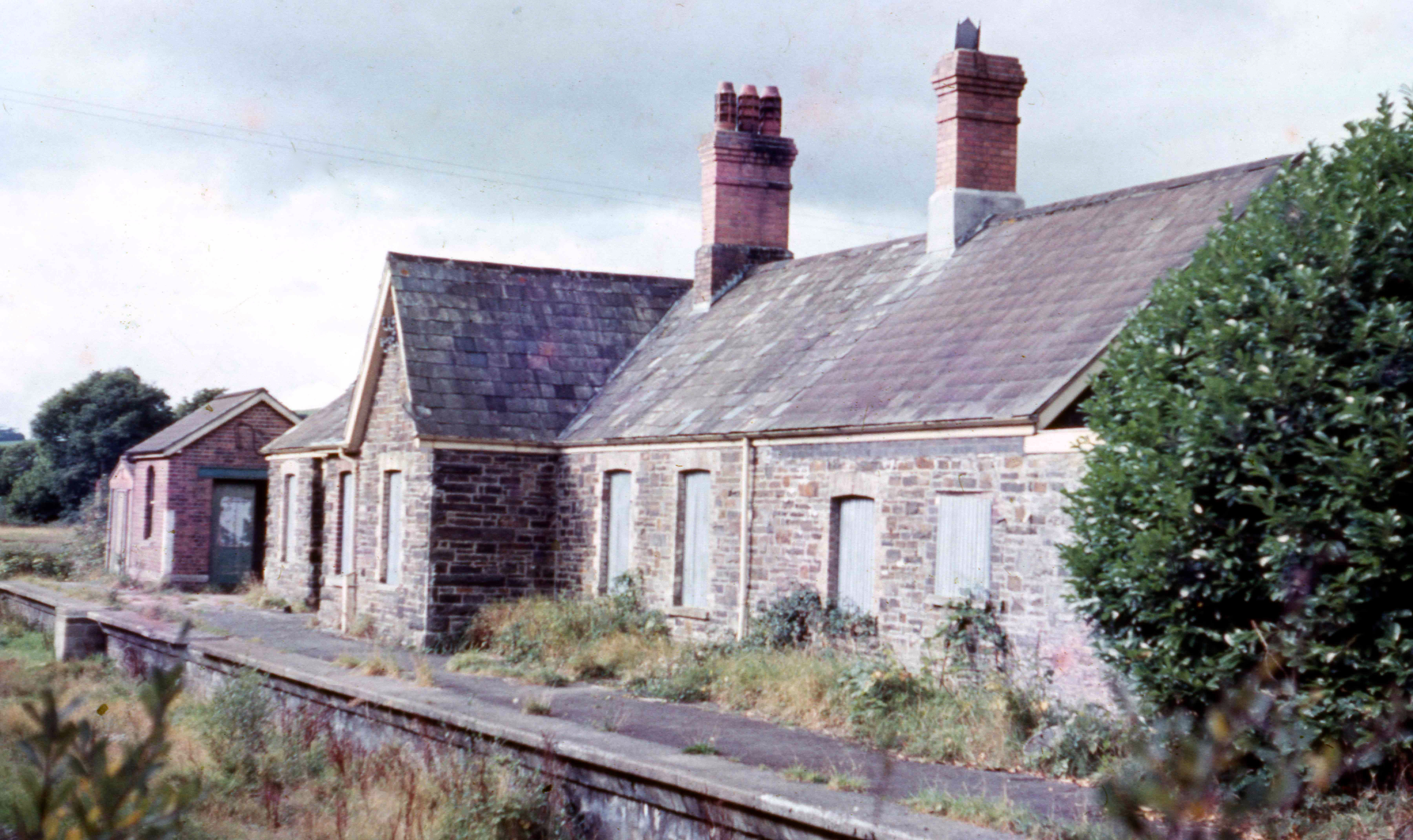
Filleigh station in 1971

This station was opened as "Castle Hill", being named after a local mansion owned by Earl Fortescue. A single platform was provided on the north side of the line with passenger facilities in a stone building. A small goods yard and goods shed were at the west end of the station. It was renamed 'Filleigh' on 1 January 1881 after the nearby village so as to avoid confusion with Castle Hill station in London (which itself has since been renamed West Ealing).

It remained a single-platform station through 1876 and 1902 capacity improvements along the line, but on 20 June 1937 was given a passing loop and second platform, although no shelter was provided for this. The original signal box at the east end of the original platform was replaced at the same time by one in the goods yard. The goods yard was closed from 3 August 1964 and the signal box and loop likewise on 6 September 1964. After closure to passengers the station building was used as a house until it was demolished when the North Devon Link Road was built through the site.

=== Swimbridge ===
This station served the village of Swimbridge in Devon. It had just a single platform on the south side of the line until a second platform and passing loop were provided from 19 February 1904. The goods shed was on a loop line opposite the original platform so from 1904 was behind the westbound platform. The original small signal box was at the east end of the original platform, but was replaced by one in the middle of that platform when the loop was lengthened. Goods traffic was withdrawn from 3 August 1964. The site is now been taken over by the North Devon Link Road. The goods shed is now a private residence called the sidings.

=== Barnstaple ===
The D&SR terminus was on the eastern side of Barnstaple in Devon. The long single platform was on the north side of the line; the track on the south side of this was mainly used for the arrivals while a shorter track on the north side used for departures. The passenger building was wooden. An extensive goods yard with a large stone goods shed was on the south side of the station, while at the eastern end of this was the small locomotive shed and turntable.

The station was known simply as 'Barnstaple' by the GWR but from 26 September 1949 became 'Barnstaple Victoria Road' to differentiate it from the other stations in the town: Barnstaple Junction and Barnstaple Town. All passenger services were diverted to Barnstaple Junction from 13 June 1960, but Victoria Road remained open for freight traffic until 1970. The station buildings have now been demolished and the site is part of an industrial estate, however, the goods shed survives and is used as a church.

== Motive power ==
In the 1890s most trains were operated by 455 'Metro' Class 2-4-0T locomotives, along with some 0-6-0 tender locomotives such as the 388 Class. These were later supplemented by 517 Class 0-4-2Ts, 3300 'Bulldog' Class 4-4-0s and 806 Class 2-4-0s. In the 1930s the regular locomotives were 'Bulldogs', 4300 Class 2-6-0s, 3200 Class 0-6-0s and, on lighter trains, 4575 Class 2-6-2Ts. 6300 Class 2-6-0s sometimes worked to Barnstaple but they had to go to Barnstaple Junction to be turned as they were too large for the turntable at the D&SR terminus.

== Services ==
Five passenger and two goods trains were scheduled to operate daily in the October 1880 timetable, as they still were immediately before World War I. By 1898 through coaches were detached from trains from London Paddington and the North of England at Taunton then conveyed over the line to Barnstaple Junction and Ilfracombe attached to local trains. Through trains from Paddington to Ilfracombe were running in the summer by 1905. Before World War II the passenger service had increased to seven trains.

The following example timetable shows the weekday passenger services in October 1920 (there was no service on Sundays).

Down trains						Up trains					
Taunton	08:00	10:40	13:30	17:30	19:55	Ilfracombe	–	–	09:25	11:40	16:40
Norton Fitzwarren	08:06	10:46	13:36	17:36	20:02	Barnstaple	07:00	08:50	11:00	15:00	18:00
Milverton	08:16	10:56	13:46	17:46	20:12	Swimbridge	07:10	09:00	11:08	15:16	18:11
Wiveliscombe	08:25	11:05	13:55	17:55	20:21	Filleigh	07:19	09:09	11:17	15:25	18:23
Venn Cross	08:37	11:17	14:07	18:07	20:33	South Molton	07:29	09:24	11:27	15:38	18:38
Morebath	08:46	11:26	14:16	18:16	20:42	Bishop's Nympton	07:38	09:33	11:39	15:49	18:50
Dulverton	08:56	11:37	14:27	18:27	20:53	East Anstey	07:49	09:46	11:50	16:04	19:03
East Anstey	09:06	11:51	14:37	18:37	21:03	Dulverton	07:58	09:55	12:01	16:16	19:16
Bishop's Nympton	09:15	12:00	14:46	18:48	21:12	Morebath	08:07	10:04	12:10	16:26	19:24
South Molton	09:25	12:10	14:56	19:00	21:23	Venn Cross	08:16	10:13	12:19	16:36	19:33
Filleigh	09:35	12:20	15:06	19:10	21:33	Wiveliscombe	08:28	10:23	12:29	16:47	19:44
Swimbridge	09:44	12:29	15:16	19:19	21:43	Milverton	08:35	10:23	12:29	16:47	19:44
Barnstaple	09:50	12:35	15:23	19:25	21:50	Norton Fitzwarren	08:45	10:40	–	17:07	20:01
Ilfracombe	11:17	14:10	16:36	20:35	–	Taunton	08:50	10:45	12:48	17:12	20:05
