= Tiverton railway station =

Former railway station in Devon, England

Tiverton
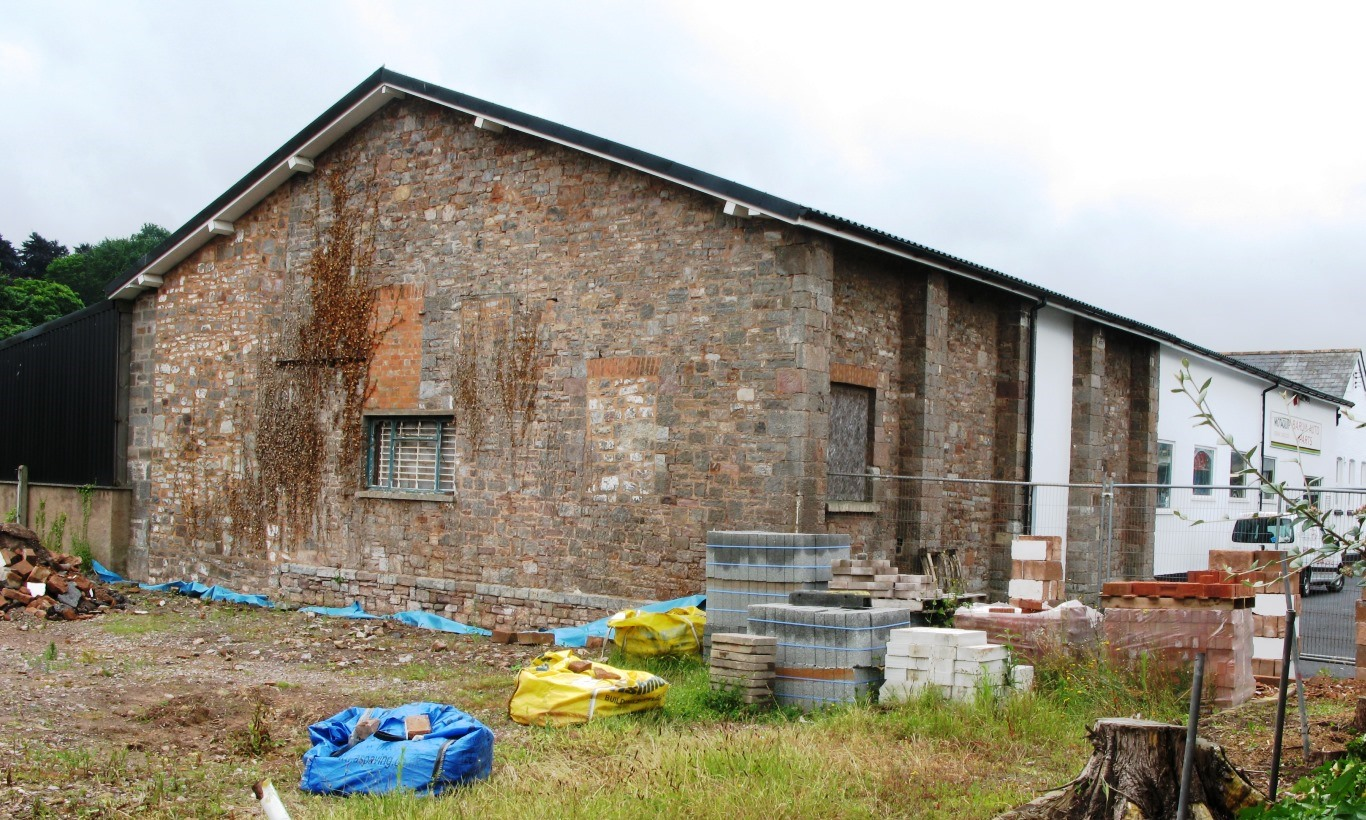
- The former goods shed seen in 2008

General information
- Location: Tiverton, Mid Devon; England
- Coordinates: 50.90312°N 3.47995°W
- Platforms: 3

Other information
- Status: Disused

History
- Original company: Bristol and Exeter Railway
- Pre-grouping: Great Western Railway
- Post-grouping: Great Western Railway

Key dates
- 1848: opened
- 1964: closed for passengers
- 1967: closed for freight
Location

Tiverton railway station served the town of Tiverton, Devon, England. It opened in 1848 as the terminus station of a broad gauge branch line from the Bristol and Exeter Railway main line: the main line junction station four miles away had originally been called Tiverton Road but was renamed as Tiverton Junction when the branch opened.

In 1884 and 1885, with the Bristol and Exeter Railway having been taken over by the Great Western Railway, Tiverton was reached by two other railways which then linked up to form a through route. From the north, the Tiverton and North Devon Railway was a branch line from the Devon and Somerset Railway at Morebath Junction and brought through services from Dulverton; to the south of Tiverton, the Exe Valley Railway, which opened in 1885, provided services through to Exeter, with a junction with the Bristol and Exeter main line at Stoke Canon.

The arrival of this new route meant that the original station was not adequate and a large new station was built on the through line, with a junction for the original line to Tiverton Junction.

The station was busy right up to the time of its closure, but traffic on the rest of the Exe Valley line suffered from competition with the roads. The Exe Valley line closed in 1963 and passenger services were withdrawn from the original line from Tiverton Junction just a year later, with goods facilities closing in 1967. The station was later demolished and much of the rail route around the town has disappeared under the A396 relief road system.

A section of the rail route, between Manley Bridge over the Grand Western Canal and Old Road, adjacent to the junction of Blundells Road and the A369 Great Western Way in Tiverton, has been converted for use as a foot- and cycle-path. It is approximately 2.25 km in length.

== The Tivvy Bumper ==
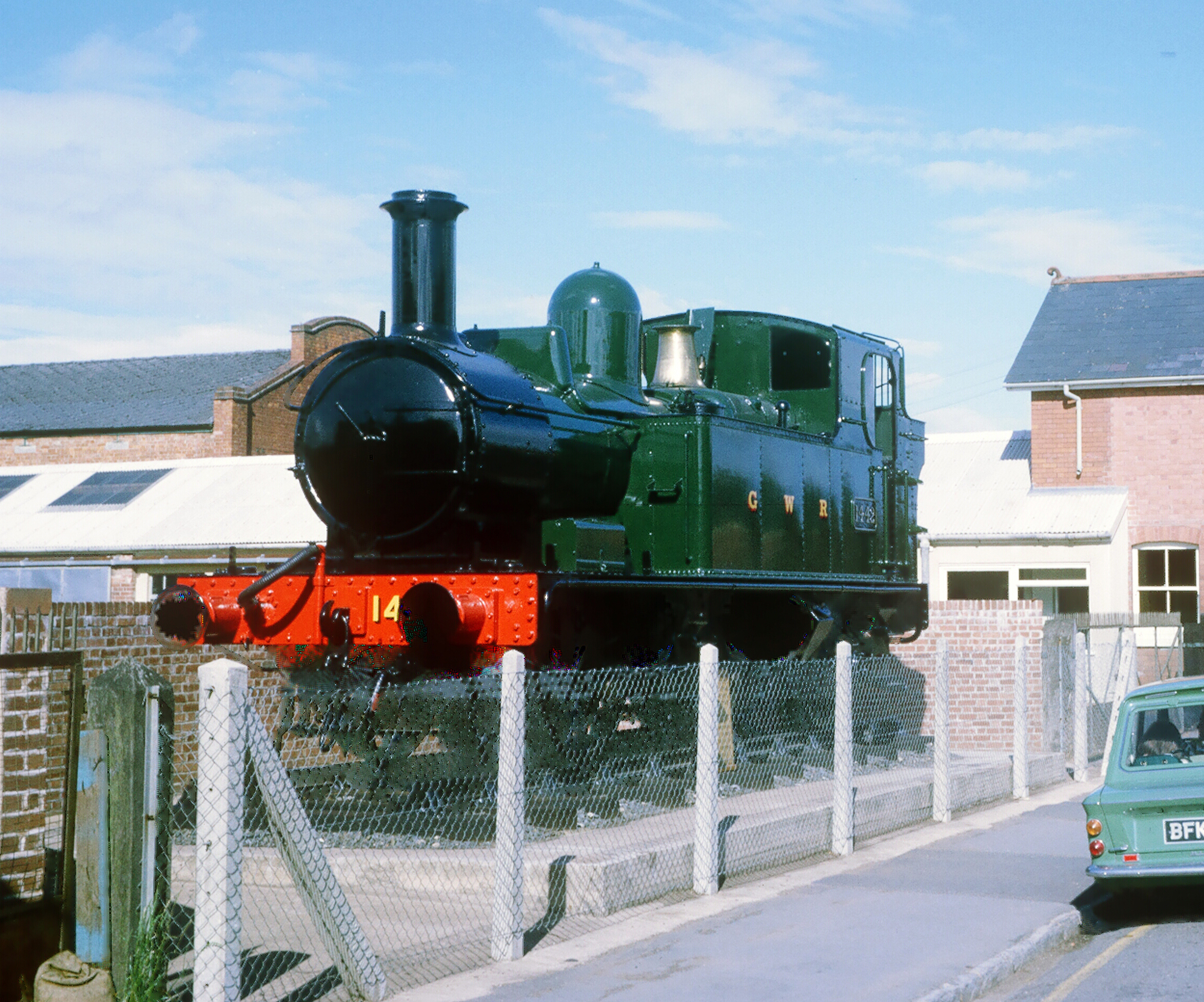
GWR 1400 Class 0-4-2T 1442, known as the "Tivvy Bumper" at Tiverton, 1968

The branch shuttle service was known locally as the Tivvy Bumper. It used an Autocoach. One of the locomotives used to run the service (no 1442) is now on display at the Tiverton Museum of Mid Devon Life, having been purchased by Lord Amory in 1965, and moved to the museum in 1978 to protect it from the weather.)
