= Rewe, Devon =

Village in Devon, England

Coordinates: 50.784°N 3.497°W

Rewe
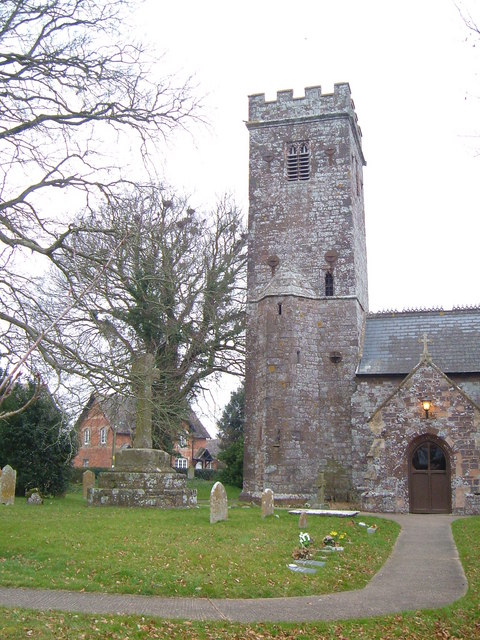
- Church of St Mary the Virgin, Rewe

- Location within Devon
- Population: 378 (civil parish, 2001 Census)
- OS grid reference: SX9499
- Civil parish: Rewe
- District: East Devon
- Shire county: Devon
- Region: South West
- Country: England
- Sovereign state: United Kingdom
- Post town: EXETER
- Postcode district: EX5
- Dialling code: 01392
- Police: Devon and Cornwall
- Fire: Devon and Somerset
- Ambulance: South Western
- UK Parliament: Central Devon

Rewe is a village and civil parish in the county of Devon in England. It lies on the river Culm, 5 miles (8 km) north of the city of Exeter and 9 miles (14 km) south of the town of Tiverton. Rewe is a linear village, with most of its buildings lying along the A396 road about 1 mile (1.6 km) north of the larger village of Stoke Canon. The Reading to Plymouth railway line also passes through the village, but there has never been a station here; the nearest operating station (as of 2009) is Exeter St Davids. Before its closure, Stoke Canon station was the nearest.

The parish church is the Church of St. Mary the Virgin, built around 1450 in the Perpendicular Gothic style. The Church also contains the crest of Jane Seymour's family.

The hamlet of Up Exe (or Upexe) lies close to the River Exe about 2 miles (3 km) north of the village of Rewe and is included in Rewe civil parish, although it is closer to Silverton. Up Exe Halt railway station was on the Exe Valley Railway Line, which closed in 1963.

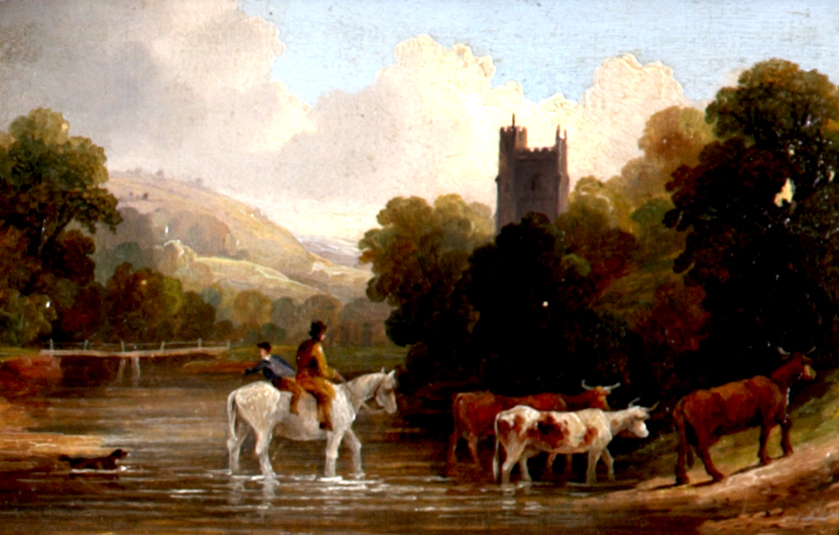
Rewe, Devon by John Wallace Tucker, 1865 - 1867
