= Tiverton Museum of Mid Devon Life =

Local museum in Tiverton, Devon, England

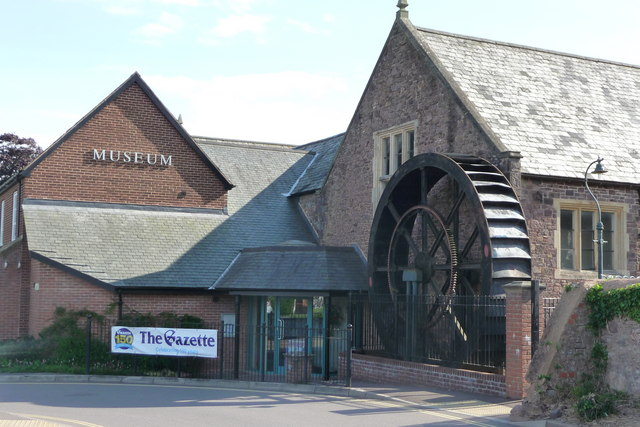
- The museum entrance

- The museum's location in Devon
- Established: 1960
- Location: Tiverton, Devon
- Coordinates: 50.901°N 3.488°W
- Type: Local history
- Website: www.tivertonmuseum.org.uk

The Tiverton Museum of Mid Devon Life is a local history museum in Tiverton, Devon, England, to the southwest of Gotham House. It features various exhibits relating to the social and economic history of the Mid Devon region, one of the most popular being a steam locomotive known as the "Tivvy Bumper". Founded in 1960 and initially located in rooms in a local pub, the museum is now housed in a Grade II listed former National School.

== History ==
The museum was founded in 1960 and initially housed in two rooms of the former Old Bell Inn on Angel Terrace. In 1962, the exhibitions were moved to Chilcott School. In 1969, as a result of the growth of the collections, the museum was moved to its own building, a former National School, where it has remained since. This move was funded by Lord Amory at a cost of £6,000. During the 1970s, the exhibition space was expanded with the construction of new galleries. Further redevelopment took place at the beginning of the 21st century, and the museum reopened with an expanded exhibition space in 2001, after an 18-month, £800,000 refurbishment. Half of this money was provided by the National Heritage Lottery Fund, and the rest was obtained through fundraising efforts in the local community. In 2012, the museum was among 20 national institutions longlisted for the Family Friendly Museum Awards.

== Collections and exhibitions ==
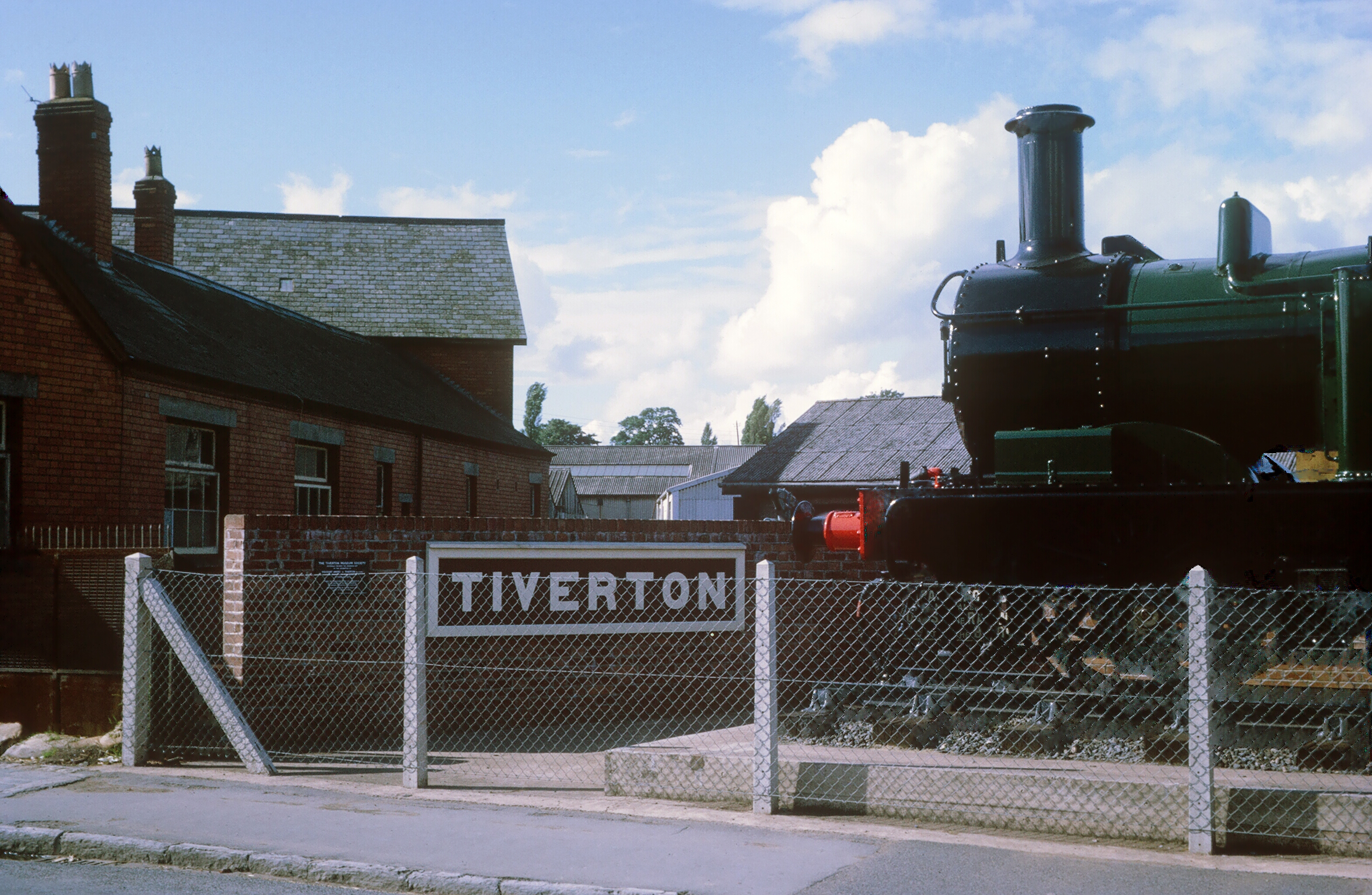
Station sign and locomotive on original site at Blundell's Road in 1968

The Tiverton Museum of Mid Devon Life has one of the largest museum collections in the West Country, and contains various exhibits relating to the economic and social life of the region. One of the most popular exhibits is the Great Western Railway steam locomotive number 1442 of the 1400 Class, known as the "Tivvy Bumper". The locomotive was in operation between 1934 and 1965, with its latter years spent transporting passengers between Tiverton and the old Tiverton Junction station at Willand; the engine serving this route was known by locals as the "Tivvy Bumper". The locomotive on display was originally located outside on Blundell's Road in Tiverton, having been purchased by Lord Amory in 1965, but it was moved to the museum in 1978 to protect it from the weather. It is now housed in the Authers Gallery, which was constructed around the engine. This gallery features other exhibits related to road and rail transport in Mid Devon, including bicycles, a Mini and signalling equipment. Museum visitors can stand inside the locomotive's cab.

Other galleries include the Alford Gallery, featuring various items of agricultural equipment, including two of only three surviving examples of Devon spindle-sided ship wagons, and the Heathcoat gallery, named after lace-maker John Heathcoat who owned a factory in Tiverton, which contains a lace frame patented by Heathcoat. There is a restored waterwheel outside the museum's entrance. The museum also has a temporary exhibition space, which has housed a variety of exhibits in the past, including exhibitions on the history of teddy bears, historic photographs of the region and "childhood treasures".

As well as its museum exhibits, there is a library with a Devon Record Office Service Point, assisting visitors with research into local family history.

== Virtual Victorians ==
The museum runs the Virtual Victorians website, which provides an exploration of life in the Victorian era through the experiences of the Poslett family who lived in the town in the 19th century. It contains various digital artefacts, including archived editions of the Tiverton Gazette from the 19th century and extracts from the logbook of the Heathcoat lace factory. The site was launched in March 2000, and received 27 million visits from 142 countries within its first four years. The website is particular aimed at schoolchildren and is used in schools throughout the United Kingdom.
