= The Old House, Milverton =

The Old House
- Location within Somerset
- 51°01′32″N 3°15′10″W
- Location: Milverton in Somerset, England

History
- Built: late 14th and early 15th century

Listed Building – Grade II*
- Official name: The Old House
- Designated: 25 January 1956
- Reference no.: 1060552

The Old House in Milverton in Somerset, England is a Grade II* listed building dating from the late 14th and early 15th century, although there may also be remains of an earlier building on the site.

The house is built of red sandstone with Hamstone dressings. It was built as a residence for the archdeacon of Taunton and was the home of Thomas Cranmer, in the 1530s while he held the post. It was only sold by the church in the mid 20th century.

While the house was being renovated in the early 21st century, a Tudor wall painting of Henry VIII was discovered underneath the plaster as it was being removed. It is the only one of its kind in a domestic dwelling. It has been speculated that there is a secret message in the image., which has been dated to around 1541.
