= Barnstaple Victoria Road railway station =

Former railway station in Devon, England

Coordinates: 51.076283°N 4.047587°W

Barnstaple Victoria Road
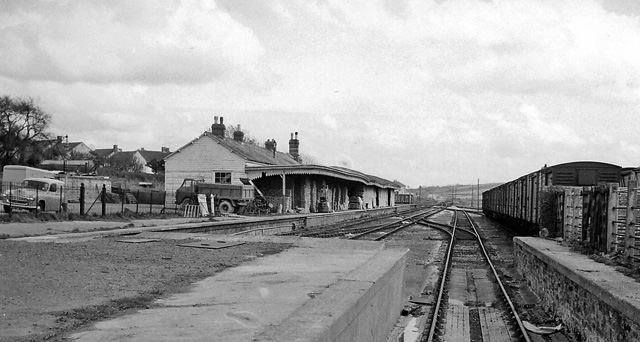
- Barnstaple Victoria Road railway station in 1964

General information
- Location: Barnstaple, North Devon; England
- Grid reference: SS566327
- Platforms: 2

Other information
- Status: Disused

History
- Original company: Devon & Somerset Railway
- Pre-grouping: Great Western Railway
- Post-grouping: Great Western Railway; Western Region of British Railways

Key dates
- 1 November 1873: Opened as "Barnstaple"
- 26 September 1949: Renamed "Barnstaple Victoria Road"
- 13 June 1960: Closed to passengers
- 1970: Closed to goods
Location

Barnstaple railway station (Barnstaple Victoria Road railway station from 1949) was the western terminus of the Devon and Somerset Railway. It was situated on the south eastern side of Barnstaple in Devon, England. It was served by passenger trains from 1873 until 1960, and by freight trains until 1970.

== History ==
The Devon and Somerset was a 7 ft (2,134 mm) broad gauge line that opened from Taunton to Wiveliscombe in 1871 and completed to Barnstaple on 1 November 1873. The line was operated by the Bristol and Exeter Railway when that company was amalgamated with the Great Western Railway (GWR) in 1876. It was converted to 4 ft 8 1/2 in (1,435 mm) standard gauge in 1881.

A line was opened on 1 June 1887 from the D&SR station to the London and South Western Railway's Barnstaple Junction railway station, enabling trains from London and Taunton to reverse at Barnstaple then continue on to Ilfracombe. On 1 July 1905 a chord was opened between the two lines (thus forming a triangular junction) which enabled direct running from the Taunton line into Barnstaple Junction. This new line was mainly used on summer Saturdays; at other times through trains on the Ilfracombe line continued to reverse at the station.

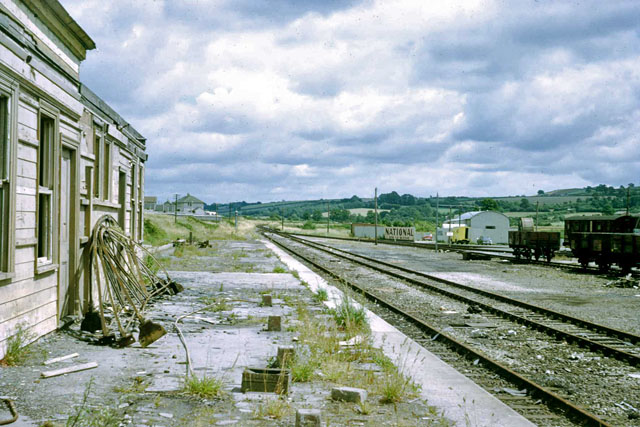
The station in 1969

From 1 January 1948 the station was managed by the Western Region of British Railways. All parcels business for Barnstaple was now handled at this station, which was given the 'Victoria Road' suffix on 26 September 1949 to avoid confusion with Barnstaple Junction or Barnstaple Town. Victoria Road was closed to passengers from 13 June 1960, after which the Devon and Somerset line trains ran directly to Barnstaple Junction until the line was closed on 3 October 1966. The goods yard remained open until 1970, trains in later years only operating via Barnstaple Junction.

== Description ==
Victoria Road had a very long single platform which was used for the arrivals, plus a bay at the eastern end that was used for departures. The single-storey building was wooden and was provided with a large canopy that extended to the platform edge. From the west end it contained a parcels office, refreshment room (later used as a store and cycle room), booking office, waiting room and ladies' toilet, gentlemen's toilet, station master's office and porter's room. There was a signal box at the eastern end of the platform and a small engine shed and turntable on the south side of the line between the station and the line to Barnstaple Junction.

The large goods yard was on the south side of the line, opposite the passenger platform. This included a large goods shed, cattle pens, and facilities to discharge oil tank wagons. Other traffic regularly received included animal feed, bananas, beer, biscuits, cement, coal, fertiliser, furniture, and tea. Outgoing goods comprised animal skins, farm machinery, gloves, lace, pottery, sugar beet, tar, thatching reed, timber, and wool.

== Services ==
Five passenger and two goods trains were scheduled to operate daily in each direction between Barnstaple and Taunton in the October 1880 timetable, as they still were immediately before World War I. By 1898 through coaches were detached from trains from London Paddington and the North of England at Taunton then conveyed via Barnstaple to Ilfracombe attached to local coaches. Through trains from Paddington to Ilfracombe were running in the summer by 1905. Before World War II the passenger service had increased to seven trains.

Preceding station	Disused railways	Following station
Swimbridge; Line and station closed	Devon and Somerset Railway; Great Western Railway	Barnstaple Junction; Line closed, station open

== After closure ==
The station buildings have now been demolished and the site is part of an industrial estate. However, the goods shed survives and is used as a church and the platforms are visible alongside the A39 and are used as a car park for Western Power Distribution, an electricity provider.
