= Halse, Somerset =

Village and civil parish in Somerset, England

Coordinates: 51°02′39″N 3°13′39″W

Halse
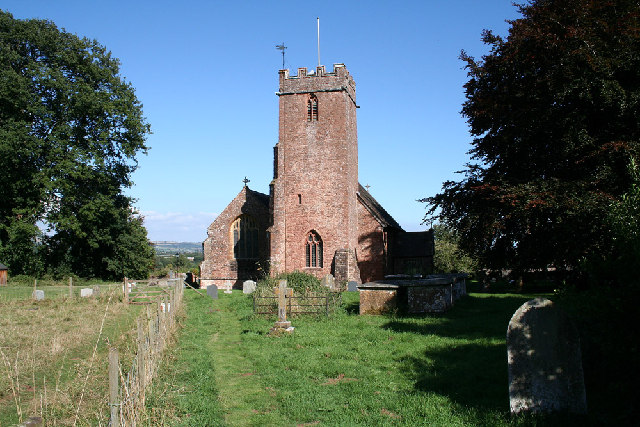
- St James' Church

- Location within Somerset
- Population: 290 (2011)
- OS grid reference: ST140279
- Unitary authority: Somerset Council
- Ceremonial county: Somerset
- Region: South West
- Country: England
- Sovereign state: United Kingdom
- Post town: TAUNTON
- Postcode district: TA4
- Dialling code: 01823
- Police: Avon and Somerset
- Fire: Devon and Somerset
- Ambulance: South Western
- UK Parliament: Tiverton and Minehead

Halse is a village and civil parish in Somerset, England, situated 6 miles (9.7 km) north west of Taunton. The village has a population of 290.

== History ==
The name of the village derives from the Old English heals meaning a neck of land.

The parish of Halse was part of the Williton and Freemanners Hundred.

After the Norman Conquest in 1066, the manor was granted to Robert Arundel who subsequently gave it to the Hospitallers of St John of Jerusalem in 1152, who held it through Buckland Priory in Durston until the dissolution of the monasteries, when it reverted to the Crown.

The estate was sold to the Hawley family in 1545, and they held it until 1652, when Sir Francis Hawley sold it to the Wescombe family. It was later held successively by the Granger, Webber, Prior and Goldney families, before the estate was broken up in 1939.

== Governance ==
The parish council has responsibility for local issues, including setting an annual precept (local rate) to cover the council's operating costs and producing annual accounts for public scrutiny. The parish council evaluates local planning applications and works with the local police, district council officers, and neighbourhood watch groups on matters of crime, security, and traffic. The parish council's role also includes initiating projects for the maintenance and repair of parish facilities, as well as consulting with the district council on the maintenance, repair, and improvement of highways, drainage, footpaths, public transport, and street cleaning. Conservation matters (including trees and listed buildings) and environmental issues are also the responsibility of the council.

For local government purposes, since 1 April 2023, the village comes under the unitary authority of Somerset Council. Prior to this, it was part of the non-metropolitan district of Somerset West and Taunton (formed on 1 April 2019) and, before this, the district of Taunton Deane (established under the Local Government Act 1972). From 1894-1974, for local government purposes, Halse was part of Taunton Rural District.

It is also part of the Tiverton and Minehead county constituency represented in the House of Commons of the Parliament of the United Kingdom. It elects one member of parliament (MP) by the first past the post system of election.

== Community facilities and activities ==
In 2020, the New Inn public house was under threat of closure. A number of villagers set up the Halse and District Community Benefit Society to buy and operate the New Inn. It has been extensively refurbished and also incorporates five Bed & Breakfast bedrooms, a self contained rental annex and a community cafe / skittles alley. The pub runs theme nights on the last Thursday of the month featuring cuisines such as Spanish, Caribbean, Japanese etc. The New Inn cafe is a popular meeting place and hosts events including a book club, photography club, bridge, craft club, monthly quiz nights and fundraising sales.

The village hall hosts a number of groups and activities such as choir practice, 'soup and pud' lunches, bowls, yoga, pilates, garden club, bell ringing, and a Sea Shanty group, in addition to being available for private bookings.

A monthly newsletter summarizing events to be held in the pub, cafe, village hall and church, is distributed to villagers.

The Tiverton to Bridgwater section of National Cycle Network Route Number 3, from Lands End to Bristol, passes 3.5 miles southeast of the village, near Hillfarrance.

== Religious sites ==
The village is served by a Norman church of St James the Less. The church choir also doubles up as the village choir.

== Notable residents ==
Author and scriptwriter Jonathan Morris lived in the village from 1975 to 1993.
