= Silverton, Devon =

Village in Devon, England

Coordinates: 50.816°N 3.484°W

Silverton
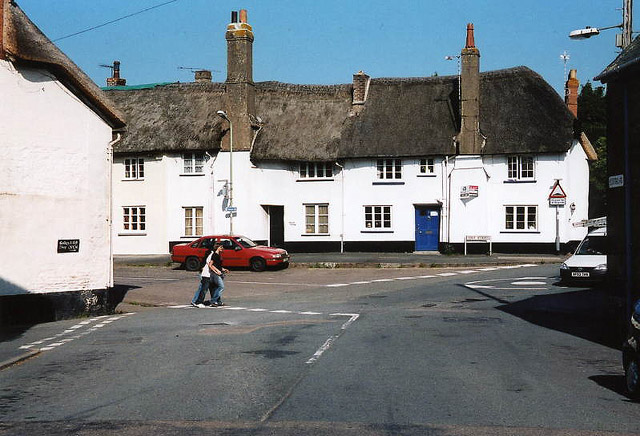
- Fore Street, Silverton

- Location within Devon
- Population: 1,494 (2011 Census)
- OS grid reference: SS955028
- Civil parish: Silverton
- District: Mid Devon
- Shire county: Devon
- Region: South West
- Country: England
- Sovereign state: United Kingdom
- Post town: EXETER
- Postcode district: EX5
- Dialling code: 01392
- Police: Devon and Cornwall
- Fire: Devon and Somerset
- Ambulance: South Western
- UK Parliament: Central Devon

Silverton is a large village and civil parish, about 8 miles (13 km) north of Exeter, in the English county of Devon. It is one of the oldest villages in Devon and dates from the first years of the Saxon occupation.

It has been suggested that the medieval manor of Burn, within the modern parish of Silverton, may be the estate listed as Mylenburnan (Mill-on-the-Burn or Burn Mill) in the will of King Alfred the Great of 899, now in the British Library, in which it was left to his youngest son Athelweard (c. 880-922).

In the year 2001, its population was 1,905, recounted to 1,494 at the United Kingdom Census 2011. The electoral ward with the same name had a population of 1,875 at the above census. The parish has two pubs: The Lamb and The Silverton Inn. The church, dating back to the fourteenth century, is dedicated to St Mary. It has a full set of bells that are rung regularly. Inside, the pews have doors at the end of each row which is unusual in this area. The village also has a further two churches - an Evangelical and a Methodist church; both are popular with social and youth clubs.

The village is on the "old" road from Exeter to Tiverton and as such was once a busy thriving place. Now it has become a dormitory for people working in Exeter although there are still a number of original families living in the village. A post office, a small supermarket (Spar) and a hairdresser offer most necessities for the residents.

The main feature of the village was the giant oak tree, believed to be around 600 years old, until it fell to the ground in January 2024.

On the first Saturday of each August, the village holds the Silverton Street Market, which is popular amongst both local people and many from across Devon and the South West. There are stalls selling local goods and crafts, as well as entertainment and children's activities organised throughout the day, and the tug-of-war always ends the day on a high.

Silverton is represented on Mid Devon District Council by Liberal Democratic Party Councillor Josh Wright (Village Ward) and by Conservative Councillor Rhys Roberts (North Ward).

The Bristol and Exeter Railway opened a Station at Silverton in 1867, it closed to passengers on 5 October 1964 and freight 3 May 1965, but a private siding serving a paper mill, which had been opened on 26 July 1894, survived until the 31 August 1967. The Station Master from its opening until 1894 was one Roger Langdon (1825-1894), a noted amateur astronomer. Following the partial solar eclipse of 22 December 1870 Langdon altered his telescope to view a solar prominence. He also observed the planet Venus including the transit of 1882. A summary of his life was published by Patrick Moore.

== Silverton North Ward ==
Silverton Parish is divided into two wards; Village Ward to the south includes the village of Silverton together with the hamlets of Ellerhayes, Greenslinch, Hayne and Poundsland, and is home to around 95% of the population of the parish. In contrast, North Ward with a population of around 80, is almost entirely rural. Noted Devon historian William Hoskins claimed that Silverton North Ward was the location of Stochelie, a Domesday manor whose location had long been lost. His findings were supported by noted historical geographers Professor Sir Henry Darby and R. Welldon Finn who state that Stochelie is “Leigh in Silverton”, and by Darcy with George R. Versey. In 2009 Historic England stated unequivocally that Reichel (an earlier identification) was incorrect and supported Hoskins’ findings. If so, North Ward would at one time have contained a small manor quite separate from Silverton. Until the 1990s the only settlements comprised a dozen or so working farms. Today most of these have been converted into small groups of dwellings including Underleigh, Dorweek, Ravenshayes and Leigh Barton. Bounded to the west by the small Burn river and to the north by the village of Butterleigh and lying on the slopes of the Hayridge Hills, North Ward provides views of the Exe, Burn and Culm valleys.

== Silverton Parochial Trust ==
The Silverton Parochial Trust is a historic charity still operating in the Silverton area. It comprises a collection of 13 legacies, the earliest dating from 1616 and now formed into a modern charitable trust controlling property, land and investments. It is managed by seven resident trustees. Funds are available for the immediate assistance of parishioners who are in a condition of ‘need, hardship or distress’ which is not provided for by the state schemes such as Social Services or state benefit programmes.

== Parish church ==
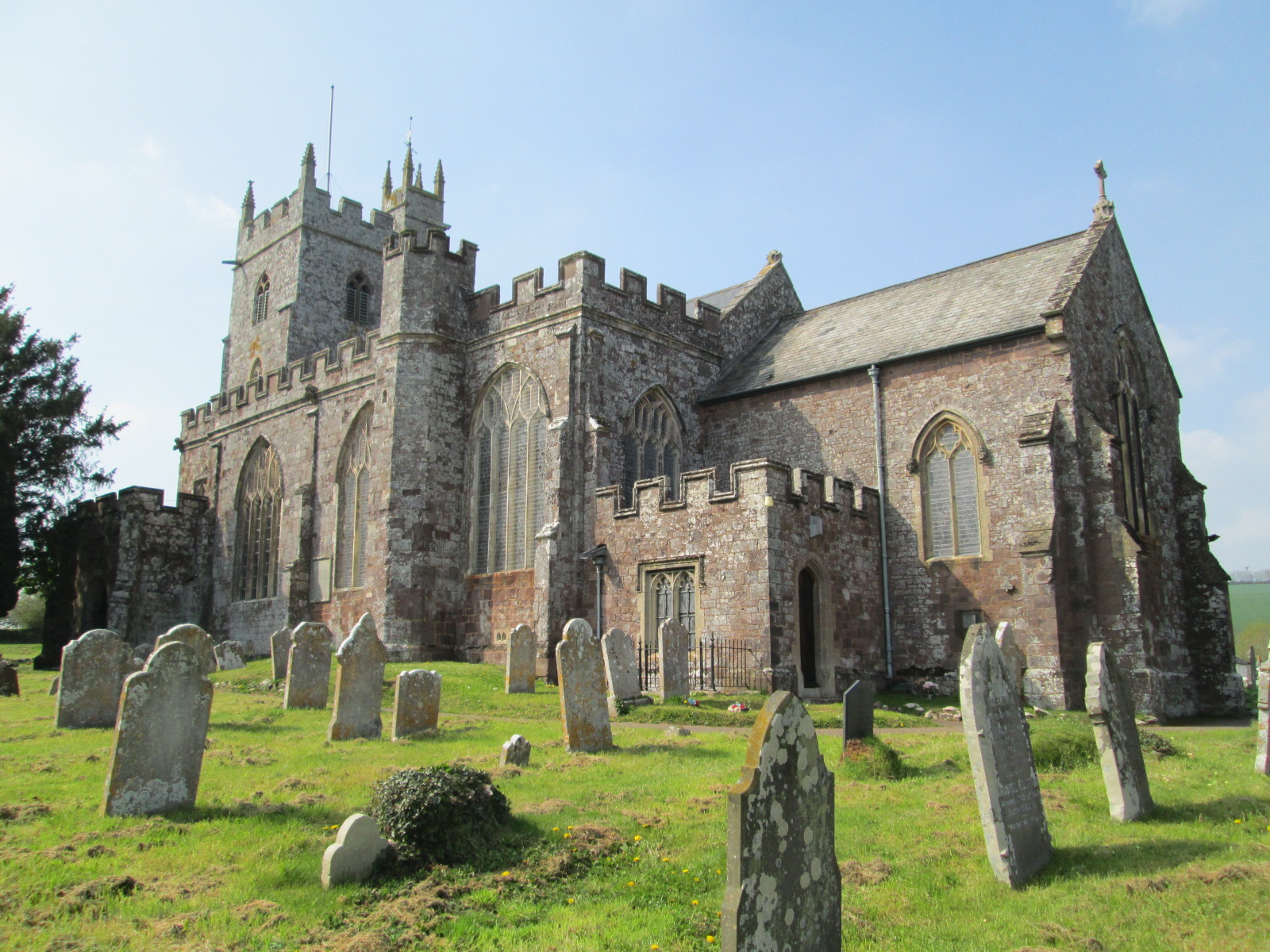
Silverton parish church

The parish church, dedicated to St Mary, is a building mainly of the 15th and 16th centuries; it has a nave, chancel and north and south aisles. The west tower has battlements, buttresses and four pinnacles. The north aisle was built with funds left by a rector who died in 1479; a rebus referring to a rector of 1519-49 is on the east respond of the north arcade. A new chancel, vestry and two western bays were added by the architects Hayward and Ashworth in 1860-63.

== Twin city ==
- Saint-Thégonnec, Brittany, France since 2008.

== See also ==
- Silverton Park, a demolished large mansion
