= Fitzhead =

Village and civil parish in Somerset, England

Coordinates: 51.0490°N 3.2639°W

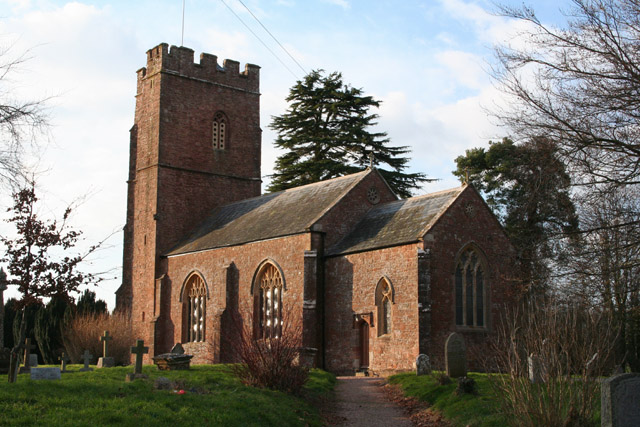
- Church of St James the Great, Fitzhead

- Location within Somerset
- Population: 264 (2011)
- OS grid reference: ST115285
- Unitary authority: Somerset Council
- Ceremonial county: Somerset
- Region: South West
- Country: England
- Sovereign state: United Kingdom
- Post town: TAUNTON
- Postcode district: TA4
- Dialling code: 01823
- Police: Avon and Somerset
- Fire: Devon and Somerset
- Ambulance: South Western
- UK Parliament: Tiverton and Minehead

Fitzhead is a village and civil parish in Somerset, England, situated approximately 6 miles (9.7 km) north west of Taunton. The village has an estimated population of 264.

== History ==
The name of the village, which was recorded as Fifida in 1178 indicates the original extent of five hides (about 600 acres (242.8 ha).

The parish of Fitzhead was part of the Kingsbury Hundred,

== Governance ==
The parish council has responsibility for local issues, including setting an annual precept (local rate) to cover the council’s operating costs and producing annual accounts for public scrutiny. The parish council evaluates local planning applications and works with the local police, district council officers, and neighbourhood watch groups on matters of crime, security, and traffic. The parish council's role also includes initiating projects for the maintenance and repair of parish facilities, as well as consulting with the district council on the maintenance, repair, and improvement of highways, drainage, footpaths, public transport, and street cleaning. Conservation matters (including trees and listed buildings) and environmental issues are also the responsibility of the council.

For local government purposes, since 1 April 2023, the village comes under the unitary authority of Somerset Council. Prior to this, it was part of the non-metropolitan district of Somerset West and Taunton (formed on 1 April 2019) and, before this, the district of Taunton Deane (established under the Local Government Act 1972). From 1894-1974, for local government purposes, Fitzhead was part of Wellington Rural District.

It is also part of the Tiverton and Minehead county constituency represented in the House of Commons of the Parliament of the United Kingdom. It elects one Member of Parliament (MP) by the first past the post system of election, and was part of the South West England constituency of the European Parliament prior to Britain leaving the European Union in January 2020, which elected seven MEPs using the d'Hondt method of party-list proportional representation.

== Landmarks ==
Fitzhead Court and The Manor date from the late 16th century. The building was constructed by Major Robert Cannon (died 1685) a royalist veteran of the Civil War, and passed through his successors to the Somerville Barons. The estate was sold to Baron Ashburton in 1840. The village is also home to two defunct village pumps.

== Religious sites ==
The parish Church of St James the Great dates from the 15th century with expansion and restoration in the 19th century. It has been designated as a grade II* listed building. The cross in the churchyard is from the 14th century.
