= Ash Priors =

Village in Somerset, England

Coordinates: 51.058°N 3.211°W

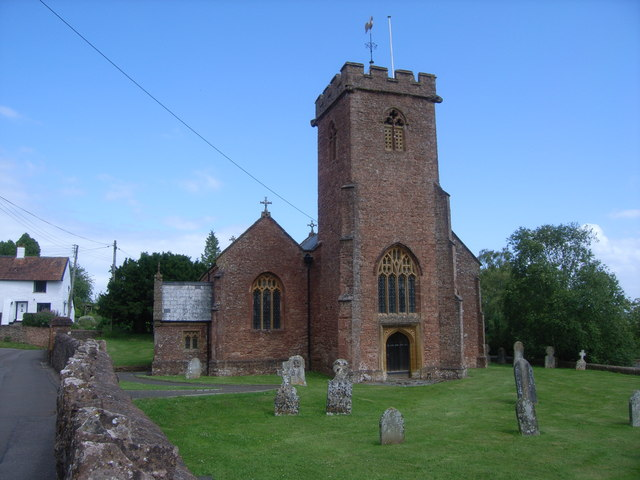
- Holy Trinity Church

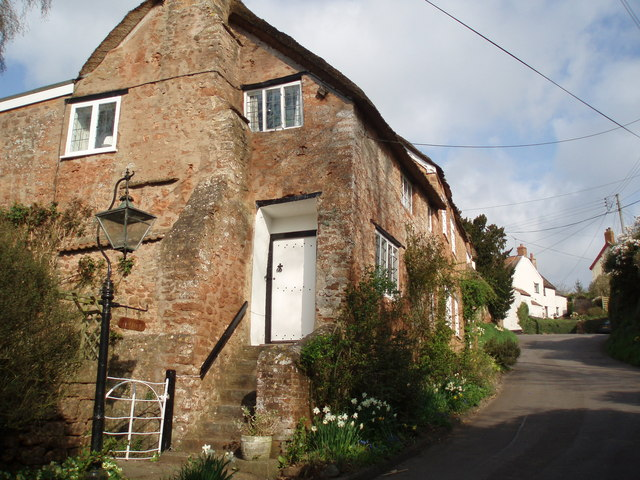
- Village road

- Location within Somerset
- Population: 155 (2011)
- OS grid reference: ST152294
- Unitary authority: Somerset Council
- Ceremonial county: Somerset
- Region: South West
- Country: England
- Sovereign state: United Kingdom
- Post town: TAUNTON
- Postcode district: TA4
- Police: Avon and Somerset
- Fire: Devon and Somerset
- Ambulance: South Western
- UK Parliament: Tiverton and Minehead

Ash Priors is a village and parish in Somerset, England, situated 5 miles (8.0 km) north west of Taunton. The village has a population of 155.

== History ==
The parish of Ash Priors was part of the Hundred of Kilmersdon.

The current house known as The Priory was probably built in the 17th century. It was owned by the Priory in Taunton before the Reformation, hence the name of the village.

== Governance ==
The Parish meeting of all residents has responsibility for local issues, including setting an annual precept (local rate) to cover the council's operating costs and producing annual accounts for public scrutiny. The parish council evaluates local planning applications and works with the local police, district council officers, and neighbourhood watch groups on matters of crime, security, and traffic. The parish council's role also includes initiating projects for the maintenance and repair of parish facilities, as well as consulting with the district council on the maintenance, repair, and improvement of highways, drainage, footpaths, public transport, and street cleaning. Conservation matters (including trees and listed buildings) and environmental issues are also the responsibility of the council.

For local government purposes, since 1 April 2023, the village comes under the unitary authority of Somerset Council. Prior to this, it was part of the non-metropolitan district of Somerset West and Taunton (formed on 1 April 2019) and, before this, the district of Taunton Deane (established under the Local Government Act 1972) and part of Taunton Rural District before that. The Village is preserved by planning regulations as an "area of restraint", meaning that no major redevelopment should take place in Ash Priors itself.

It is also part of the Tiverton and Minehead county constituency represented in the House of Commons of the Parliament of the United Kingdom. It elects one Member of Parliament (MP) by the first past the post system of election. It was part of the South West England constituency of the European Parliament prior to Britain leaving the European Union in January 2020, which elected seven MEPs using the d'Hondt method of party-list proportional representation.

== Geography ==
Ash Priors Common, south of the village is a 21 hectares (52 acres) local nature reserve of unimproved neutral grassland, semi-natural deciduous woodland, wet heath, scrub, carr, stream, ponds and hedgerows. The plants to be found at the site include early marsh-orchid and twayblade orchid while the animals include the Eurasian harvest mouse, viviparous lizard and tree pipit. It was the first and is the largest local nature reserve run by Taunton Deane Council.

== Religious sites ==
The Church of the Holy Trinity was built in the 15th century. It is a Grade II* listed building.

== Notable residents ==
Science fiction writer Arthur C. Clarke was once resident at Ballifants Farm, on the outskirts of the village.
