= Milverton, Somerset =

Village in Somerset, England

Coordinates: 51.0221°N 3.2489°W

Milverton
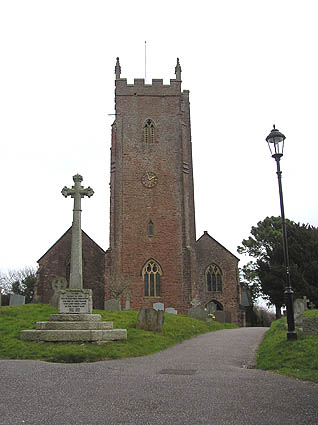
- St Michael's Church, Milverton

- Location within Somerset
- Population: 1,438 (2011)
- OS grid reference: ST125255
- Unitary authority: Somerset Council
- Ceremonial county: Somerset
- Region: South West
- Country: England
- Sovereign state: United Kingdom
- Post town: TAUNTON
- Postcode district: TA4
- Dialling code: 01823
- Police: Avon and Somerset
- Fire: Devon and Somerset
- Ambulance: South Western
- UK Parliament: Tiverton and Minehead

Milverton is a village and civil parish in Somerset, England, situated in the valley of the River Tone 5 miles (8.0 km) west of Taunton. The village has a population of 1,438. The parish includes the hamlet of Preston Bowyer.

It has one public house, The Globe (The White Hart public house closed in March 2008), a convenience store, a piano dealership and workshop, a post office, a taxi service and a hairdresser.

== History ==
The name of the village is believed to come from the Old English and mean settlement at the mill ford. There is evidence of a mill within the parish from the Domesday Book of 1086. These referred to the site of the Town Mills on Hillfarrence Brook.

Neolithic flint arrowheads have been found to the west of the village and Bronze Age axe heads were discovered when the bypass, which opened in 1975, was being built.

Just before the Norman Conquest, Milverton was granted by Queen Edith of Wessex to Gisa, Bishop of Wells, but this was reversed by William the Conqueror. The manor was then united with Torrington in Devon, passing in 1212 to William Briwere. The parish was part of the Milverton Hundred.

The Old House is a Grade II* listed building dating from the late 14th and early 15th century. It was built as a residence for the archdeacon of Taunton and was once the home of Thomas Cranmer. While the house was being renovated in the early 21st century a Tudor wall painting of Henry VIII was discovered underneath the plaster and is the only one of its kind in a domestic dwelling. It has been speculated that there is a secret message in the image., which has been dated to around 1541.

In 1708 there was a fire which destroyed 13 properties. Trade was largely based on cloth manufacture and in 1819 Lamech Swift established a silk throwing factory which employed up to 300 women and children.

The village used to have a station on the Devon and Somerset Railway, which closed in 1966.

Milverton is the location of noted plant nursery Junkers Nursery, which specialises in unusual shrubs and trees including Acer palmatum, Betula, Cornus, Daphne, Magnolia, Parrotia, Stewartia and Styrax,

=== Quaker heritage ===
The village of Milverton has a notable Quaker history, beginning in 1679 when Edward Pole made land available on the parish boundary with Wiveliscombe for use as a burial ground and meeting house. This occurred during a period of restrictions on nonconformist worship under laws such as the Conventicle Act 1664, which led many Quakers—including those from Milverton—to face fines, imprisonment, or the seizure of property for refusing to pay church tithes or swear oaths of allegiance. Friends also participated in meetings held at Ilchester Gaol, where Quaker prisoners were sometimes allowed to congregate together.

A formal Quaker meeting house was registered at Milverton in 1684, following the Act of Toleration. In 1753, a purpose-built meeting house was constructed beside the Pole family home, known as "The Recess," which served as a focal point for both worship and education through a small Quaker school.

The former Quaker burial ground, now located off Quaking House Lane west of the village, contains memorials spanning over two centuries. It has been maintained periodically by the Quaker community and is listed in the Quaker Cemeteries Register. Milverton was administratively part of the West Somerset Monthly Meeting, linked to other nearby meetings in Taunton, Wellington, and Bridgwater. Among those serving as trustees was Elias Osborne of Chard, a prominent Quaker who oversaw multiple Friends' properties during the late 17th century.

Elements of the original meeting house still exist in the fabric of Ivy Cottage (also known as the Old Quaker House) on North Street, which is now a Grade II listed building. The renowned scientist Thomas Young was born in Milverton in 1773 and grew up in a Quaker household connected to the local meeting.

== Governance ==
The parish council has responsibility for local issues, including setting an annual precept (local rate) to cover the council's operating costs and producing annual accounts for public scrutiny. The parish council evaluates local planning applications and works with the local police, district council officers, and neighbourhood watch groups on matters of crime, security, and traffic. The parish council's role also includes initiating projects for the maintenance and repair of parish facilities, as well as consulting with the district council on the maintenance, repair, and improvement of highways, drainage, footpaths, public transport, and street cleaning. Conservation matters (including trees and listed buildings) and environmental issues are also the responsibility of the council.

For local government purposes, since 1 April 2023, the village comes under the unitary authority of Somerset Council. Prior to this, it was part of the non-metropolitan district of Somerset West and Taunton (formed on 1 April 2019) and, before this, the district of Taunton Deane (established under the Local Government Act 1972). From 1894-1974, for local government purposes, Milverton was part of Wellington Rural District.

There is an electoral ward in the name of 'Milverton and North Deane'. Milverton is the most populous village in the ward but this stretches north to Lydeard St Lawrence. The total population at the 2011 Census was 2,208.

It is also part of the Tiverton and Minehead county constituency represented in the House of Commons of the Parliament of the United Kingdom. It elects one Member of Parliament (MP) by the first past the post system of election.

== Religious sites ==
The Church of St Michael dates from the 13th century, on the site of an even earlier chapel, and has been designated as a Grade I listed building.

== Notable residents ==
- Thomas Young (1773–1829), polymath who contributed to the scientific understanding of vision, light, solid mechanics, energy, physiology, and Egyptology, in particular the decipherment of the Egyptian hieroglyphics of the Rosetta Stone.
- Herbert Hopkins (1895–1972), Australian-born cricketer played 85 First-class cricket matches, died in the village.
- Alexander Waugh (1963–2024), writer, critic and journalist, died in the village.
- Carly Bawden (born 1988), actress, grew up on a farm in Milverton

== Twin towns – sister cities ==
Argentan is twinned with:

- Longny les Villages, France
