= List of ecclesiastical parishes in the Diocese of Bath and Wells =

Diocese of Bath and Wells
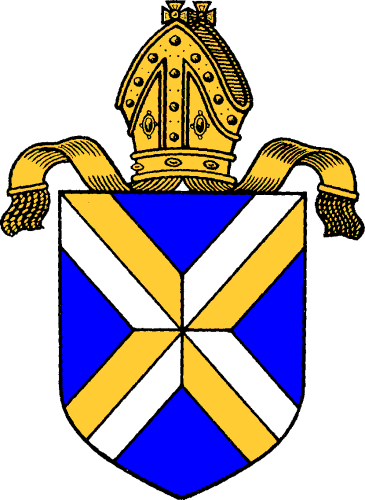

Location
- Ecclesiastical province: Canterbury
- Archdeaconries: Bath, Wells, Taunton

Statistics
- Parishes: 477
- Churches: 569

Information
- Cathedral: Cathedral Church of Saint Andrew

Current leadership
- Bishop: Michael Beasley, Bishop of Bath and Wells
- Suffragan: Fiona Gibson, Bishop of Taunton
- Archdeacons: Simon Hill, Archdeacon of Taunton; Anne Gell, Archdeacon of Wells; Charlie Peer, Archdeacon of Bath

Website
- bathandwells.org.uk

The ecclesiastical parishes within the Diocese of Bath and Wells cover the majority of the English county of Somerset and small areas of Devon, Dorset, Gloucestershire and Wiltshire. The episcopal seat of the Bishop of Bath and Wells is in the Cathedral Church of Saint Andrew in the city of Wells in Somerset.

The diocesan offices, the bishops' offices and residences and the cathedral are all located around the Bishop's Palace in Wells. The diocese is not referred to as "Bath diocese" or "Wells diocese", but as "Bath and Wells diocese". The ordinary of the diocese is the diocesan Bishop of Bath and Wells, Michael Beasley; he is assisted throughout the diocese by the Bishop suffragan of Taunton, Fiona Gibson. Her See was created in 1911.

Alternative episcopal oversight (for parishes in the diocese that reject the ministry of women priests) is provided by the provincial episcopal visitor, the Bishop suffragan of Oswestry, Paul Thomas, who is licensed as an honorary assistant bishop of the diocese.

== Background ==
The parish with its local parish church is the basic unit of the Church of England. The parish within the Church of England structure has its roots in the Roman Catholic Church and survived the Reformation largely untouched. Church of England parishes each fall within one of 44 dioceses divided between the provinces of Canterbury, with 30 dioceses, and York with 14. In 2017 there were approximately 12,600 Church of England parishes, 477 of them within this diocese.

Each parish is administered by a parish priest who may be assisted in his pastoral duties by a curate or curates, who are also ordained but not parish priests. There are wide variations in the size of parishes and church-going populations. A parish priest may have responsibility for one parish or for two or more, and some are part of a team ministry. By extension, the term parish refers not only to the territorial unit but to the people of its community or congregation. A benefice or "living" in the Church of England describes any ecclesiastical parish or group of ecclesiastical parishes under a single stipendiary minister. The holder of a benefice owns the "freehold" of the post (the church and the parsonage house) for life.

Until the late 19th century, the parishes were the smallest area for local government and administrative functions. Following the Local Government Act 1894, the civil duties of the church were abolished and separate civil parishes were established. As a result of the different needs of the civil community and the church, in many cases the boundaries of the ecclesiastical parishes and their equivalent civil parish have diverged with time.

== Archdeaconry of Bath ==
The archdeaconry covers most of the two unitary authorities of North Somerset and Bath and North East Somerset, and also includes sections of neighbouring districts in Somerset and Wiltshire. The Archdeacon of Bath is Adrian Youings.

=== Deanery of Bath ===
The deanery is mostly within Bath and North East Somerset, but includes one civil parish in Wiltshire and a small section in South Gloucestershire. As well as covering the city of Bath, it also includes the surrounding suburbs of the city and neighbouring villages.

Ecclesiastical parish	Benefice	Parish church	Location	Image	Civil parish(es)	District(s)
Bath Abbey with St James	Bath Abbey with St James	Bath Abbey	51.3815°N 2.3587°W	Bath Abbey	Bath (unparished)	Bath and North East Somerset
Bath, Bathwick: St John	Bath Bathwick	St John	51.3883°N 2.3554°W	St John: Bathwick	Bath (unparished)	Bath and North East Somerset
Bath, Bathwick: St Mary	Bath Bathwick	St Mary	51.3847°N 2.3511°W	St Mary: Bathwick	Bath (unparished)	Bath and North East Somerset
Bath: The Ascension	Bath Marlbrook Team	The Ascension	51.3738°N 2.3824°W	–	Bath (unparished)	Bath and North East Somerset
Bath: Twerton-on-Avon	Bath Marlbrook Team	St Michael	51.3809°N 2.3982°W	St Michael: Twerton	Bath (unparished)	Bath and North East Somerset
Bath Combe Hay	Bath Odd Down with Combe Hay	Combe Hay	51.3374°N 2.3815°W	Combe Hay Church	All of Combe Hay (Note: Ecclesiastical parish is identical to corresponding civil parish)	Bath and North East Somerset
Bath, Odd Down	Bath Odd Down with Combe Hay	St Philip & St James	51.3613°N 2.3809°W	St Philip & St James: Odd Down	Bath (unparished)	Bath and North East Somerset
Bath St Michael Without	Bath St Michael Without	St Michael	51.3842°N 2.3601°W	St Michael: Bath	Bath (unparished)	Bath and North East Somerset
Bath: St Barnabas	Bath St Barnabas with Englishcombe	St Barnabas	51.3695°N 2.3946°W	St Barnabas: Bath	Bath (unparished)	Bath and North East Somerset
Englishcombe	Bath St Barnabas with Englishcombe	St Peter	51.3644°N 2.4089°W	St Peter: Englishcombe	All of Englishcombe. Small part of Bath (unparished)	Bath and North East Somerset
Bath St Bartholomew	Bath St Bartholomew	St Bartholomew	51.3751°N 2.3745°W	St Bartholomew: Bath	Bath (unparished)	Bath and North East Somerset
Bath St Luke	Bath St Luke	St Luke	51.3687°N 2.3667°W	St Luke: Bath	Bath (unparished)	Bath and North East Somerset
Bath St Saviour	Bath St Saviour with Swainswick and Woolley	St Saviour	51.3958°N 2.3465°W	St Saviour: Bath	Bath (unparished)	Bath and North East Somerset
Swainswick with Woolley	Bath St Saviour with Swainswick and Woolley	St Mary; All Saints	51.4143°N 2.3516°W	St Mary: Swainswick	All of Swainswick; Charlcombe; Bath (unparished)	Bath and North East Somerset
Bath, Walcot	Bath Walcot	St Swithin; St Andrew; Christ Church	51.3886°N 2.3593°W	St Swithin: Bath	Bath (unparished)	Bath and North East Somerset
Bath, Weston: All Saints	Bath Weston All Saints with North Stoke and Langridge	All Saints	51.3956°N 2.3883°W	All Saints: Bath	Bath (unparished); Charlcombe; Kelston	Bath and North East Somerset
Langridge	Bath Weston All Saints with North Stoke and Langridge	St Mary	51.4239°N 2.3681°W	St Mary: Langridge	Charlcombe	Bath and North East Somerset
North Stoke	Bath Weston All Saints with North Stoke and Langridge	St Martin	51.4203°N 2.4274°W	St Martin: North Stoke	All of North Stoke; Small part of Bitton	Bath and North East Somerset, South Gloucestershire
Bath, Weston: St John	Bath Weston St John with Kelston	St John; Emmanuel	51.3852°N 2.3817°W	St John: Weston, Bath	Bath (unparished); Small part of Kelston	Bath and North East Somerset
Kelston	Bath Weston St John with Kelston	St Nicholas	51.4004°N 2.4342°W	St Nicholas: Kelston	Most of Kelston	Bath and North East Somerset
Bath, Widcombe	Bath Widcombe	St Thomas à Becket; St Matthew	51.3734°N 2.3465°W	St Thomas à Becket: Widcombe	Bath (unparished)	Bath and North East Somerset
Bathampton	Bathampton with Claverton	St Nicholas	51.3975°N 2.3217°W	St Nicholas: Bathampton	All of Bathampton	Bath and North East Somerset
Claverton	Bathampton with Claverton	St Mary	51.3759°N 2.3061°W	St Mary: Claverton	All of Claverton; Bath (unparished)	Bath and North East Somerset
Batheaston (LEP)	Batheaston with St Catherine	St John: Batheaston; St Catherine: St Catherine	51.4097°N 2.3214°W	St John: Batheaston	All of Batheaston; All of St Catherine; Bath (unparished)	Bath and North East Somerset
Bathford	Bathford	St Swithin	51.3983°N 2.3062°W	St Swithin: Bathford	All of Bathford	Bath and North East Somerset
Bath: St Stephen	Charlcombe with Bath St Stephen	St Stephen	51.3928°N 2.3636°W	St Stephen: Bath	2 sections - 1 in Bath (unparished). 1 in Bath (unparished); Charlcombe	Bath and North East Somerset
Charlcombe	Charlcombe with Bath St Stephen	St Mary	51.4044°N 2.3628°W	St Mary: Charlecombe	Charlcombe, Bath (unparished)	Bath and North East Somerset
Combe Down	Combe Down with Monkton Combe and South Stoke	Holy Trinity; St Andrew	51.3592°N 2.3457°W	Holy Trinity: Combe Down	Bath (unparished); Monkton Combe	Bath and North East Somerset
Monkton Combe	Combe Down with Monkton Combe and South Stoke	St Michael	51.3561°N 2.3286°W	St Michael: Monkton Combe	Most of Monkton Combe; Bath (unparished)	Bath and North East Somerset
South Stoke	Combe Down with Monkton Combe and South Stoke	St James	51.3497°N 2.3653°W	St James: South Stoke	All of Southstoke	Bath and North East Somerset
Freshford with Limpley Stoke and Hinton Charterhouse	Freshford, Limpley Stoke and Hinton Charterhouse	St Peter: Freshford; St John: Hinton Charterhouse; St Mary	51.34°N 2.3033°W	St John: Hinton Charterhouse	All of Freshford; All of Hinton Charterhouse; All of Limpley Stoke	Bath and North East Somerset, Wiltshire

=== Deanery of Chew Magna ===
The area covered includes the Chew Valley, and surrounding areas. The deanery is mostly within Bath and North East Somerset, and also includes a portion of North Somerset, Mendip and Sedgemoor. Part of the area falls within the Mendip Hills Area of Outstanding Natural Beauty. Most of the rural area is within the Bristol and Bath Green Belt.

Ecclesiastical parish	Benefice	Parish church	Location	Image	Civil parish(es)	District(s)
Blagdon	Blagdon with Compton Martin and Ubley	St Andrew; St Hugh	51.3277°N 2.7131°W	St Andrew: Blagdon	All of Blagdon; Priddy; Cheddar; Butcombe	Bath and North East Somerset, Mendip, North Somerset
Compton Martin	Blagdon with Compton Martin and Ubley	St Michael	51.3103°N 2.6542°W	St Michael: Compton Martin	Compton Martin; Priddy	Bath and North East Somerset, Mendip
Ubley	Blagdon with Compton Martin and Ubley	St Bartholomew	51.3214°N 2.6767°W	St Batholomew: Ubley	All of Ubley; Priddy	Bath and North East Somerset, Mendip
Chew Magna	Chew Magna with Dundry, Norton Malreward and Stanton Drew	St Andrew	51.3667°N 2.6097°W	St Andrew: Chew Magna	Chew Magna; Norton Malreward	Bath and North East Somerset
Dundry	Chew Magna with Dundry, Norton Malreward and Stanton Drew	St Michael	51.399°N 2.6373°W	St Michael: Dundry	Dundry; Winford	Bath and North East Somerset, North Somerset
Norton Malreward	Chew Magna with Dundry, Norton Malreward and Stanton Drew	Holy Trinity	51.3831°N 2.5711°W	Holy Trinity: Norton Malreward	Norton Malreward; Stanton Drew	Bath and North East Somerset
Stanton Drew	Chew Magna with Dundry, Norton Malreward and Stanton Drew	St Mary	51.3658°N 2.5791°W	St Mary: Stanton Drew	Stanton Drew; Publow	Bath and North East Somerset
Chew Stoke	Chew Stoke with Nempnett Thrubwell	St Andrew	51.3507°N 2.6383°W	St Andrew: Chew Stoke	Chew Stoke; Chew Magna	Bath and North East Somerset
Nempnett Thrubwell	Chew Stoke with Nempnett Thrubwell	St Mary	51.3408°N 2.6722°W	St Mary: Nempnett Thrubwell	Nempnett Thrubwell; Chew Stoke	Bath and North East Somerset
Bishop Sutton	Bishop Sutton and Stowey	Holy Trinity	51.3341°N 2.5960°W	Holy Trinity: Bishop Sutton	Stowey-Sutton; Chew Magna	Bath and North East Somerset
Clutton with Cameley	Farmborough with Marksbury and Stanton Prior, Clutton with Cameley	St Augustine: Clutton & St James: Cameley	51.3281°N 2.5431°W	St Augustine of Hippo: Clutton	Clutton; Cameley; Hinton Blewett	Bath and North East Somerset
Stowey	Bishop Sutton and Stowey	St Nicholas and St Mary	51.3325°N 2.5767°W	St Nicholas and St Mary: Stowey	Stowey-Sutton; Chew Magna	Bath and North East Somerset
East Harptree with West Harptree and Hinton Blewett	East with West Harptree and Hinton Blewett	St Laurence: East Harptree, St Mary: West Harptree & St Margaret: Hinton Blewett	51.3011°N 2.6247°W	St Laurence: East Harptree	All of East Harptree, all of West Harptree, Hinton Blewett; Priddy	Bath and North East Somerset
Farmborough	Farmborough with Marksbury and Stanton Prior, Clutton with Cameley	All Saints	51.3431°N 2.4878°W	All Saints: Farmborough	All of Farmborough	Bath and North East Somerset
Marksbury	Farmborough with Marksbury and Stanton Prior, Clutton with Cameley	St Peter	51.3592°N 2.4803°W	St Peter: Marksbury	Marksbury	Bath and North East Somerset
Stanton Prior	Farmborough with Marksbury and Stanton Prior, Clutton with Cameley	St Lawrence	51.3628°N 2.4639°W	St Lawrence: Stanton Prior	Marksbury	Bath and North East Somerset
Keynsham	Keynsham	St John; Chewton Keynsham Mission Church; St Francis; St Michael; St Margaret	51.4175°N 2.4986°W	St John: Keynsham	Keynsham; Compton Dando; Whitchurch	Bath and North East Somerset
Compton Dando and Chelwood	Publow with Pensford, Compton Dando and Chelwood	St Mary: Compton Dando & St Leonard: Chelwood	51.3797°N 2.5106°W	St Mary: Compton Dando	Compton Dando & all of Chelwood	Bath and North East Somerset
Publow with Pensford	Publow with Pensford, Compton Dando and Chelwood	All Saints: Publow	51.3761°N 2.5422°W	All Saints: Publow	Publow; Stanton Drew	Bath and North East Somerset
Corston	Saltford with Corston and Newton St Loe	All Saints	51.3858°N 2.4398°W	All Saints: Corston	All of Corston	Bath and North East Somerset
Newton St Loe	Saltford with Corston and Newton St Loe	Holy Trinity	51.3822°N 2.4308°W	Holy Trinity: Newton St Loe	All of Newton St Loe	Bath and North East Somerset
Saltford	Saltford with Corston and Newton St Loe	St Mary	51.4056°N 2.4542°W	St Mary: Saltford	Saltford; Keynsham	Bath and North East Somerset
Felton Common Hill	Winford with Felton Common Hill	St Katherine	51.3878°N 2.6977°W	St Katherine: Felton	Backwell; Winford; Wrington	North Somerset
Winford	Winford with Felton Common Hill	St Mary and St Peter; St James	51.3825°N 2.6581°W	St Mary and St Peter: Winford	Winford; Nempnett Thrubwell; Dundry	North Somerset, Bath and North East Somerset

=== Deanery of Locking ===
The Deanery of Locking covers Weston-super-Mare and the surrounding villages. It is mostly within North Somerset, but includes sections of Mendip and Sedgemoor.

Ecclesiastical parish	Benefice	Parish church	Location	Image	Civil parish(es)	District(s)
Banwell	Banwell	St Andrew	51.3279°N 2.8633°W	St Andrew: Banwell	Banwell; Hutton, Somerset; Locking; Weston-super-Mare	North Somerset
Bournville (LEP)	Bleadon and Bournville	St Andrew	51.3319°N 2.9657°W	–	Weston-super-Mare	North Somerset
St Peter and St Paul, Bleadon	Bleadon and Bournville	St Peter & St Paul	51.3075°N 2.9462°W	St Andrew: Bleadon	All of Bleadon; Weston-super-Mare; Lympsham	North Somerset, Sedgemoor
Churchill and Langford	Churchill and Langford	St John: Churchill; St Mary: Lower Langford	51.3385°N 2.8088°W	St John: Churchill	All of Churchill	North Somerset
Congresbury	Congresbury with Puxton and Hewish St Ann	St Andrew	51.3697°N 2.8091°W	St Andrew: Congresbury	All of Congresbury; All of Puxton; Banwell; Weston-super-Mare	North Somerset
Hutton	Hutton and Locking	St Mary	51.3228°N 2.9307°W	St Mary: Hutton	Hutton; Weston-super-Mare	North Somerset
Locking	Hutton and Locking	St Augustine	51.3322°N 2.9152°W	St Augustine: Locking	Locking; Weston-super-Mare	North Somerset
Kewstoke	Milton and Kewstoke	St Paul	51.3655°N 2.957°W	St Paul: Kewstoke	Kewstoke; Weston-super-Mare	North Somerset
Milton St Peter with St Jude	Milton and Kewstoke	St Peter and St Jude	51.3530°N 2.9402°W	St Peter and St Jude: Milton	Weston-super-Mare	North Somerset
Weston-super-Mare: Saint Nicholas with Saint Barnabas	Saint Nicholas with Saint Barnabas, Weston-super-Mare	St Nicholas; St Barnabas	51.3244°N 2.9781°W	St Barnabas: Weston-super-Mare	Weston-super-Mare	North Somerset|
Weston-super-Mare: All Saints with St Saviour	Weston-super-Mare All SS and St Saviour	All Saints	51.3531°N 2.9765°W	–	Weston-super-Mare	North Somerset
Weston-super-Mare: Christ Church	Weston-super-Mare Christ Church and Emmanuel	Christ Church	51.3505°N 2.9695°W	Christ Church: Weston-super-Mare	Weston-super-Mare	North Somerset
Weston-super-Mare: Emmanuel	Weston-super-Mare Christ Church and Emmanuel	Emmanuel Church	51.3458°N 2.9771°W	St Emmanuel: Weston-super-Mare	Weston-super-Mare	North Somerset
Weston-super-Mare: St John	Weston-super-Mare St John	St John	51.3525°N 2.9809°W	St John: Weston-super-Mare	Weston-super-Mare	North Somerset
Weston-super-Mare: St Paul	Weston-super-Mare St Paul	St Paul	51.3377°N 2.9781°W	St Paul: Weston-super-Mare	Weston-super-Mare	North Somerset
Winscombe and Sandford	Winscombe and Sandford	St James; All Saints	51.3116°N 2.8342°W	St James: Winscombe	Winscombe and Sandford; Shipham	North Somerset, Sedgemoor
Worle (LEP)	Worle	St Martin; St Lawrence Chapel; St Lawrence Church; Chapel; St Mark's Church Centre; Locking Castle	51.3614°N 2.9306°W	St Martin: Worle	All of Wick St Lawrence; Weston-super-Mare; Kewstoke; St Georges; Locking	North Somerset
Burrington	Wrington with Butcombe and Burrington	Holy Trinity	51.3307°N 2.7497°W	Holy Trinity: Burrington	All of Burrington, Somerset	North Somerset
Butcombe	Wrington with Butcombe and Burrington	St Michael and All Angels	51.3539°N 2.6973°W	St Michael: Butcombe	Butcombe	North Somerset
Wrington	Wrington with Butcombe and Burrington	All Saints; Christ Church	51.361°N 2.7658°W	All Saints: Wrington	Wrington	North Somerset

=== Deanery of Midsomer Norton ===
The deanery covers Midsomer Norton, Radstock and the surrounding villages which made up the part of the Somerset Coalfield. The area is split between the local government areas of Bath and North East Somerset and Mendip.

Ecclesiastical parish	Benefice	Parish church	Location	Image	Civil parish(es)	District(s)
Chilcompton with Downside	Chilcompton with Downside and Stratton on the Fosse	St John	51.2697°N 2.5075°W	St John: Chilcompton	Chilcompton; Ston Easton	Mendip
Stratton-on-the-Fosse	Chilcompton with Downside and Stratton on the Fosse	St Vigor	51.2552°N 2.4896°W	St Vigor: Stratton-on-the-Fosse	Stratton-on-the-Fosse	Mendip
Coleford	Coleford with Holcombe	Holy Trinity	51.2393°N 2.4500°W	Holy Trinity: Coleford	Coleford; Holcombe	Mendip
Holcombe	Coleford with Holcombe	St Andrew	51.2547°N 2.4758°W	St Andrew: Holcombe	Holcombe; Coleford; Kilmersdon; Stratton-on-the-Fosse	Mendip
Kilmersdon with Babington	Kilmersdon with Babington	St Peter and St Paul	51.2702°N 2.437°W	St Peter and St Paul: Kilmersdon	Kilmersdon; Coleford, Somerset; Radstock	Mendip, Bath and North East Somerset
Midsomer Norton with Clandown	Midsomer Norton with Clandown	St John	51.2858°N 2.4853°W	St John: Midsomer Norton	Midsomer Norton; Paulton; Radstock; Ston Easton	Mendip, Bath and North East Somerset
Farrington Gurney	Paulton with Farrington Gurney & High Littleton	St John	51.2995°N 2.5248°W	St John: Farrington Gurney	All of Farrington Gurney	Bath and North East Somerset
High Littleton	Paulton with Farrington Gurney & High Littleton	Holy Trinity	51.3198°N 2.5099°W	Holy Trinity: High Littleton	High Littleton; Clutton	Bath and North East Somerset
Paulton	Paulton with Farrington Gurney & High Littleton	Holy Trinity	51.3075°N 2.5042°W	Holy Trinity: Paulton	Paulton; Midsomer Norton	Bath and North East Somerset
Foxcote with Shoscombe	Peasedown Saint John with Wellow and Foxcote with Shoscombe	St James	51.2986°N 2.4090°W	St James: Foxcote	Hemington; Peasedown St John; Shoscombe	Bath and North East Somerset
Peasedown: St John	Peasedown Saint John with Wellow and Foxcote with Shoscombe	St John	51.3164°N 2.4331°W	St John: Peasedown St John	Peasedown St John	Bath and North East Somerset
Wellow	Peasedown Saint John with Wellow and Foxcote with Shoscombe	St Julian	51.3244°N 2.3725°W	St Julian: Wellow	Wellow; Shoscombe; Norton St Philip	Bath and North East Somerset, Mendip
Radstock with Writhlington	Radstock with Writhlington	St Nicholas	51.2899°N 2.4483°W	St Nicholas: Radstock	Radstock; Kilmersdon; Westfield	Bath and North East Somerset
Camerton	Timsbury with Priston, Camerton and Dunkerton	St Peter	51.3151°N 2.4505°W	St Peter: Camerton	Camerton; Peasedown St John	Bath and North East Somerset
Dunkerton	Timsbury with Priston, Camerton and Dunkerton	All Saints	51.3319°N 2.4158°W	All Saints: Dunkerton	Dunkerton and Tunley	Bath and North East Somerset
Priston	Timsbury with Priston, Camerton and Dunkerton	St Luke and St Andrew	51.3433°N 2.4386°W	St Luke & St Andrew: Priston	All of Priston; Dunkerton and Tunley	Bath and North East Somerset
Timsbury	Timsbury with Priston, Camerton and Dunkerton	St Mary	51.3256°N 2.4789°W	St Mary: Timsbury	Timsbury	Bath and North East Somerset
Westfield	Westfield	St Peter	51.2818°N 2.4709°W	St Peter: Westfield	Westfield; Kilmersdon; Midsomer Norton	Bath and North East Somerset, Mendip

=== Deanery of Portishead ===
The deanery covers the coastal towns of Portishead and Clevedon and the surrounding area. It is wholly within North Somerset.

Ecclesiastical parish	Benefice	Parish church	Location	Image	Civil parish(es)	District(s)
Backwell	Backwell with Chelvey and Brockley	St Andrew	51.4114°N 2.7306°W	St Andrew: Backwell	Backwell	North Somerset
Chelvey and Brockley	Backwell with Chelvey and Brockley	St Bridget: Chelvey	51.4119°N 2.7678°W	St Bridget: Chelvey	All of Brockley	North Somerset
Clevedon: Christ Church (LEP)	Clevedon St Andrew and Christ Church	Christ Church	51.439°N 2.8519°W	Christ Church: Clevedon	Clevedon	North Somerset
Clevedon: St Andrew	Clevedon St Andrew and Christ Church	St Andrew	51.4329°N 2.8725°W	St Andrew: Clevedon	Clevedon	North Somerset
Clevedon: St Peter	Clevedon St Andrew and Christ Church	St Peter	51.442°N 2.8596°W	St Peter: Clevedon	Clevedon	North Somerset
Clevedon: St John the Evangelist	Clevedon St John	St John	51.4367°N 2.8549°W	St John: Clevedon	Clevedon; Kenn	North Somerset
East Clevedon with Clapton-in-Gordano	East Clevedon with Clapton in Gordano, Walton in Clevedano	All Saints: Clevedon	51.4426°N 2.8406°W	St Michael: Clapton in Gordano	Clevedon; Clapton in Gordano	North Somerset
Walton-in-Gordano	East Clevedon with Clapton in Gordano, Walton in Clevedano	St Paul	51.454°N 2.828°W	St Paul: Walton in Gordano	All of Walton in Gordano; Clevedon	North Somerset
Walton-in-Gordano: St. Mary	East Clevedon with Clapton in Gordano, Walton in Gordano	St Mary	51.4474°N 2.8462°W	St Mary: Walton St Mary	Clevedon	North Somerset
Weston-in-Gordano	East Clevedon with Clapton in Gordano, Walton in Clevedano	St Peter and St Paul	51.4642°N 2.802°W	St Peter and St Paul: Weston-in-Gordano	Weston in Gordano; Portishead	North Somerset
Barrow Gurney	Long Ashton with Barrow Guerney and Flax Bourton	St Mary and St Edward	51.4131°N 2.8414°W	St Mary and St Edward: Barrow Gurney	Barrow Gurney; Long Ashton; Wraxall and Failand	North Somerset
Flax-Bourton	Long Ashton with Barrow Guerney and Flax Bourton	St Michael and All Angels	51.4212°N 2.711°W	St Michael and All Angels: Flax Bourton	Flax Bourton	North Somerset
Long Ashton	Long Ashton with Barrow Guerney and Flax Bourton	All Saints; Ascension	51.4358°N 2.6438°W	All Saints: Long Ashton	Long Ashton; Barrow Gurney	North Somerset
Nailsea: Christ Church	Nailsea Christ Church with Tickenham	Christ Church	51.4332°N 2.7618°W	–	Nailsea	North Somerset
Tickenham	Nailsea Christ Church with Tickenham	SS Quiricus & Julietta	51.4394°N 2.7814°W	St Quiricus & St Julietta: Tickenham	All of Tickenham	North Somerset
Nailsea: Holy Trinity	Nailsea Holy Trinity	Holy Trinity	51.4258°N 2.7693°W	Holy Trinity: Nailsea	Nailsea	North Somerset
Easton-in-Gordano	Pill, Portbury & Easton in Gordano	St George	51.4786°N 2.7008°W	St George: Easton in Gordano	Pill and Easton-in-Gordano	North Somerset
Pill (LEP)	Pill, Portbury & Easton in Gordano	Christ Church	51.4796°N 2.6862°W	Christ Church: Pill	Pill and Easton-in-Gordano	North Somerset
Portbury	Pill, Portbury & Easton in Gordano	St Mary	51.4756°N 2.7173°W	St Mary: Portbury	Portbury	North Somerset
Portishead	Portishead	St Peter; St Peter	51.4806°N 2.7702°W	St Peter: Portishead	Portishead; Portbury; Weston in Gordano	North Somerset
Wraxall	Wraxall with Failand	All Saints; St Bartholomew	51.4444°N 2.7348°W	All Saints: Wraxall	Wraxall and Failand; Clapton in Gordano; Nailsea	North Somerset
Cleeve with Claverham	Yatton Moor	Holy Trinity: Cleeve; St Barnabas: Claverham	51.391°N 2.7774°W	Holy Trinity: Cleeve	All of Cleeve; Yatton; Nailsea	North Somerset
Yatton Moor	Yatton Moor	St Mary; All Saints; St John	51.385°N 2.8185°W	St Mary: Yatton	Yatton; Kenn, Somerset; All of Kingston Seymour	North Somerset

== Archdeaconry of Taunton ==
The archdeaconry is centred on Taunton and covers the west of Somerset. It also includes small sections of Devon and Dorset. The Archdeacon of Taunton is Simon Hill.

=== Deanery of Crewkerne ===
The deanery covers areas of South Somerset including Crewkerne and North Perrott, with many of the surrounding villages. Some of the parishes are just over the county border in West Dorset.

Ecclesiastical parish	Benefice	Parish church	Location	Image	Civil parish(es)	District(s)
Hinton St George with Dinnington	Merriott with Hinton Dinnington and Lopen	St George: Hinton St George & St Nicholas: Dinnington	50.9108°N 2.8272°W	St George: Hinton St George	All of Hinton St George & Dinnington, Lopen	South Somerset
Lopen	Merriott with Hinton Dinnington and Lopen	All Saints	50.9271°N 2.8165°W	All Saints: Lopen	Lopen	South Somerset
Merriott	Merriott with Hinton Dinnington and Lopen	All Saints	50.9124°N 2.7941°W	All Saints: Merriot	Merriott	South Somerset
South Petherton with the Seavingtons and the Lambrooks	South Petherton with the Seavingtons and the Lambrooks	St Peter and St Paul: South Petherton & St Michael: Seavington St Michael; St James's	50.9483°N 2.8094°W	St Peter & St Paul: South Petherton	All of South Petherton; All of Seavington St Mary; All of Seavington St Michael & Kingsbury Episcopi	South Somerset
Crewkerne	The Wulfric Benefice	St Bartholomew; Church of the Good Shepherd	50.8814°N 2.7925°W	St Batholomew: Crekerne	All of Crewkerne; All of West Crewkerne; Merriott; Broadwindsor	South Somerset, West Dorset
Haselbury Plucknett	The Wulfric Benefice	St Michael and All Angels	50.8954°N 2.753°W	St Michael: Haselbury Plucknett	All of Haselbury Plucknett	South Somerset
Misterton	The Wulfric Benefice	St Leonard: Misterton	50.8700°N 2.7796°W	St John: Seaborough	All of Misterton; Seaborough	South Somerset, West Dorset
North Perrott	The Wulfric Benefice	St Martin	50.8825°N 2.75°W	St Martin: North Perrott	All of North Perrott	South Somerset
Wayford	The Wulfric Benefice	St Michael and All Angels	50.8563°N 2.847°W	–	All of Wayford; Broadwindsor	South Somerset, West Dorset
Barrington	Winsmoor	St Mary	50.9594°N 2.8711°W	St Mary: Barrington	Barrington	South Somerset
Chillington	Winsmoor	St James	50.8961°N 2.8692°W	St James: Chillington	All of Chillington	South Somerset
Cudworth	Winsmoor	St Michael	50.8939°N 2.8927°W	St James: Cudworth	All of Cudworth	South Somerset
Dowlish Wake	Winsmoor	St Andrew	50.9103°N 2.8886°W	St Andrew: Dowlish Wake	All of Dowlish Wake	South Somerset
Kingstone	Winsmoor	St John and All Saints	50.9188°N 2.8851°W	St John: Kingstone	All of Kingstone	South Somerset
Puckington	Winsmoor	St Andrew	50.9606°N 2.8884°W	St Andrew: Puckington	All of Puckington	South Somerset
Shepton Beauchamp	Winsmoor	St Michael	50.9503°N 2.8492°W	St Michael: Shepton Beauchamp	All of Shepton Beauchamp	South Somerset
Stocklinch	Winsmoor	St Mary	50.9492°N 2.8733°W	St Mary: Stocklinch	All of Stocklinch	South Somerset

=== Deanery of Exmoor ===
The deanery covers large areas of Exmoor in West Somerset. The population is sparse and clustered around small towns and villages.

Ecclesiastical parish	Benefice	Parish church	Location	Image	Civil parish(es)	District(s)
Alcombe	Alcombe	St Michael	51.196°N 3.4663°W	St Michael: Alcombe	Minehead	West Somerset
Brompton Regis with Withiel Florey	Dulverton with Brushford, Brompton Regis, Upton, Withiel Florey and Skilgate	St Mary: Brompton Regis; St Mary: Withiel Florey	51.0731°N 3.4981°W	St Mary: Brompton Regis	Brompton Regis	West Somerset
Brushford	Dulverton with Brushford, Brompton Regis, Upton, Withiel Florey and Skilgate	St Nicholas	51.0208°N 3.5419°W	St Nicholas: Brushford	All of Brushford; Dulverton; Brompton Regis	West Somerset
Dulverton	Dulverton with Brushford, Brompton Regis, Upton, Withiel Florey and Skilgate	All Saints	51.0411°N 3.5496°W	All Saints: Dulverton	Dulverton	West Somerset
Skilgate	Dulverton with Brushford, Brompton Regis, Upton, Withiel Florey and Skilgate	St John	51.0355°N 3.4463°W	St John: Skilgate	All of Skilgate	West Somerset
Upton	Dulverton with Brushford, Brompton Regis, Upton, Withiel Florey and Skilgate	St James	51.0512°N 3.4292°W	St James: Upton	Upton	West Somerset
Carhampton	Dunster, Carhampton, Withycombe with Roduish, Timberscombe and Wootton Courtenay	St John	51.1746°N 3.4186°W	St John: Carhampton	Carhampton	West Somerset
Dunster	Dunster, Carhampton, Withycombe with Roduish, Timberscombe and Wootton Courtenay	St George	51.1832°N 3.4459°W	St George: Dunster	All of Dunster; Carhampton; Minehead	West Somerset
Timberscombe	Dunster, Carhampton, Withycombe with Roduish, Timberscombe and Wootton Courtenay	St Petrock	51.1381°N 3.5389°W	St Petrock: Timberscombe	All of Timberscombe; Selworthy; Cutcombe	West Somerset
Withycombe with Rodhuish	Dunster, Carhampton, Withycombe with Roduish, Timberscombe and Wootton Courtenay	St Nicholas: Withycombe; St Bartholomew	51.1642°N 3.41°W	St Nicholas: Withcombe	All of Withycombe; Carhampton	West Somerset
Wootton Courtenay	Dunster, Carhampton, Withycombe with Roduish, Timberscombe and Wootton Courtenay	All Saints	51.1802°N 3.5204°W	All Saints: Wootton Courtenay	Wootton Courtenay; Minehead	West Somerset
Cutcombe	Exmoor	St John	51.1424°N 3.5295°W	St John: Cutcombe	Cutcombe	West Somerset
Exford	Exmoor	St Mary	51.1344°N 3.6341°W	St Mary: Exford	All of Exford	West Somerset
Exmoor	Exmoor	St Luke	51.141°N 3.75156°W	St Luke: Simonsbath	All of Exmoor (civil parish)	West Somerset
Exton	Exmoor	St Peter	51.0925°N 3.5353°W	St Peter: Exton	Exton; Winsford	West Somerset
Hawkridge	Exmoor	St Giles	51.0638°N 3.6266°W	St Giles: Hawkridge	Withypool and Hawkridge	West Somerset
Luxborough	Exmoor	St Mary	51.1322°N 3.4680°W	St Mary: Luxborough	All of Luxborough	West Somerset
Winsford	Exmoor	St Mary	51.1037°N 3.5659°W	St Mary: Winsford	Winsford; Exton; Withypool and Hawkridge	West Somerset
Withypool	Exmoor	St Andrew	51.108°N 3.6494°W	St Andrew: Withypool	Withypool and Hawkridge	West Somerset
Minehead	Minehead	St Michael; St Andrew; St Peter	51.2109°N 3.4805°W	St Michael: Minehead	Minehead; All of Minehead Without; Wootton Courtenay	West Somerset
Oare	Oare with Culbone	St Mary: Oare; St Beuno: Culbone	51.2213°N 3.659°W	St Beuno: Culbone	Oare	West Somerset
Leighland	Old Cleeve Leighland and Treborough	St Giles	51.1357°N 3.3850°W	St Giles: Leighland	Old Cleeve	West Somerset
Old Cleeve	Old Cleeve Leighland and Treborough	St Andrew; St Luke; St Mary	51.1683°N 3.3753°W	St Andrew: Old Cleeve	Old Cleeve; Watchet	West Somerset
Treborough	Old Cleeve Leighland and Treborough	St Peter	51.1181°N 3.4147°W	St peter: Treborough	All of Treborough	West Somerset
Luccombe	Porlock and Porlock Weir with Stoke Pero, Selworthy and Luccombe	St Mary	51.1894°N 3.5593°W	St Mary: Luccombe	Luccombe	West Somerset
Porlock and Porlock Weir with Stoke Pero	Porlock and Porlock Weir with Stoke Pero, Selworthy and Luccombe	St Dubricius: Porlock; St Nicholas; Stoke Pero Church	51.2087°N 3.5955°W	St Dubricius: Porlock	All of Porlock; Selworthy; Luccombe	West Somerset
Selworthy	Porlock and Porlock Weir with Stoke Pero, Selworthy and Luccombe	All Saints; Lynch Chapel; St Leonard	51.2102°N 3.5476°W	All Saints: Selworthy	Selworthy	West Somerset

=== Deanery of Ilminster ===
The deanery covers villages in South Somerset and Taunton Deane, as well as a single parish in West Dorset and a small section of East Devon.

Ecclesiastical parish	Benefice	Parish church	Location	Image	Civil parish(es)	District(s)
Beercrocombe	Beercrocombe with Curry Mallet, Hatch Beauchamp, Orchard Portman	St James	50.9789°N 2.9608°W	St James: Beercrocombe	All of Beercrocombe	South Somerset
Curry Mallet	Beercrocombe with Curry Mallet, Hatch Beauchamp, Orchard Portman	St James	50.9836°N 2.9497°W	St James: Curry Mallet	All of Curry Mallet; Fivehead	South Somerset
Hatch Beauchamp	Beercrocombe with Curry Mallet, Hatch Beauchamp, Orchard Portman	St John	50.9856°N 2.9902°W	St John: Hatch Beauchamp	Hatch Beauchamp	Taunton Deane
Orchard Portman	Beercrocombe with Curry Mallet, Hatch Beauchamp, Orchard Portman	St Michael	50.9893°N 3.0789°W	St Michael: Orchard Portman	Orchard Portman	Taunton Deane
Staple Fitzpaine	Beercrocombe with Curry Mallet, Hatch Beauchamp, Orchard Portman	St Peter	50.9588°N 3.0496°W	St Peter: Staple Fitzpaine	All of Staple Fitzpaine; All of Curland; All of Bickenhall; Hatch Beauchamp	Taunton Deane
Stoke Saint Mary with Thurlbear	Beercrocombe with Curry Mallet, Hatch Beauchamp, Orchard Portman	St Mary	50.9957°N 3.0476°W	St Mary: Stoke Saint Mary	Stoke St Mary; Orchard Portman	Taunton Deane
West Hatch	Beercrocombe with Curry Mallet, Hatch Beauchamp, Orchard Portman	St Andrew	50.9842°N 3.0194°W	St Andrew: West Hatch	All of West Hatch	Taunton Deane
Chard the Good Shepherd Furnham	Chard, the Good Shepherd Furnham	Good Shepherd	50.8739°N 2.9595°W	Good Shepherd: Chard	Chard; Chaffcombe; Combe St Nicholas; Knowle St Giles; Tatworth and Forton	South Somerset
Chard: St Mary	Chard, St. Mary with Combe St Nicholas, Wambrook and Whitestaunton	St Mary	50.8692°N 2.9633°W	St Mary: Chard	Chard; Combe St Nicholas; Tatworth and Forton	South Somerset
Combe St Nicholas	Chard, St. Mary with Combe St Nicholas, Wambrook and Whitestaunton	St Nicholas; St Barnabas	50.8958°N 2.9933°W	St Nicholas: Combe St Nicholas	Combe St Nicholas; Knowle St Giles; Wambrook; Whitestaunton	South Somerset
Wambrook	Chard, St. Mary with Combe St Nicholas, Wambrook and Whitestaunton	St Mary	50.8645°N 3.0047°W	St Mary: Wambrook	Wambrook	South Somerset
Whitestaunton	Chard, St. Mary with Combe St Nicholas, Wambrook and Whitestaunton	St Andrew	50.8889°N 3.0225°W	St Andrew: Whitestaunton	Whitestaunton	South Somerset
Cricket St Thomas	Cricket Saint Thomas	St Thomas	50.8733°N 2.8926°W	St Thomas: Cricket St Thomas	All of Cricket St Thomas	South Somerset
Ilminster	Ilminster and Whitelackington	St Mary	50.9272°N 2.9114°W	St Mary: Ilminster	All of Ilminster	South Somerset
Whitelackington	Ilminster and Whitelackington	St Mary	50.9335°N 2.8843°W	St Mary: Whitelackington	All of Whitelackington	South Somerset
Ashill	Isle Valley	St Mary	50.9508°N 2.9678°W	St Mary: Ashill	All of Ashill	South Somerset
Broadway	Isle Valley	St Aldhelm and St Eadburgha	50.9386°N 2.9544°W	St Aldhelm and St Eadburgha: Broadway	All of Broadway	South Somerset
Donyatt	Isle Valley	St Mary	50.9222°N 2.9416°W	St Mary: Donyatt	All of Donyatt	South Somerset
Hambridge with Earnshill	Isle Valley	St James	50.985°N 2.8668°W	St James: Hambridge	Hambridge and Westport; Drayton	South Somerset
Horton (LEP)	Isle Valley	St Peter	50.9297°N 2.9635°W	St Peter: Horton	All of Horton	South Somerset
Ilton	Isle Valley	St Peter	50.9526°N 2.924°W	St Peter: Ilton	All of Ilton	South Somerset
Isle Abbotts	Isle Valley	St Mary	50.9839°N 2.9225°W	St Mary: Isle Abbotts	All of Isle Abbotts	South Somerset
Isle Brewers	Isle Valley	All Saints	50.985°N 2.9003°W	All Saints: Isle Brewers	All of Isle Brewers	South Somerset
Buckland St Mary	The Blackdown Benefice	St Mary; Mission Church	50.9155°N 3.0386°W	St Mary: Buckland St Mary	Buckland St Mary; Combe St Nicholas	South Somerset
Churchstanton	The Blackdown Benefice	St Peter & St Paul	50.9242°N 3.1467°W	St Peter & St Paul: Churchstanton	Churchstanton; Upottery	Taunton Deane, East Devon
Corfe	The Blackdown Benefice	St Nicholas	50.9715°N 3.0945°W	St Nicholas: Corfe	All of Corfe	Taunton Deane
Otterford	The Blackdown Benefice	St Leonard	50.9231°N 3.1077°W	St Leonard: Otterford	All of Otterford	Taunton Deane
Pitminster	The Blackdown Benefice	St Andrew & St Mary: Pitminster	50.9661°N 3.111°W	St Andrew & St Mary: Pitminster	Pitminster; Trull	Taunton Deane
Chaffcombe	Two Shires	St Michael and All Angels	50.8875°N 2.9198°W	St Michael: Chaffcombe	Chaffcombe	South Somerset
Cricket Malherbie with Knowle St Giles	Two Shires	St Mary	50.8998°N 2.9096°W	St Mary: Cricket Malherbie	Knowle St Giles	South Somerset
Tatworth: St John the Evangelist	Two Shires	St John	50.8477°N 2.9575°W	St John: Tatworth	Tatworth and Forton	South Somerset
Thorncombe	Two Shires	St Mary	50.8263°N 2.8873°W	St Mary: Thorncombe	Thorncombe; Tatworth and Forton	West Dorset; South Somerset
Winsham	Two Shires	St Stephen	50.8526°N 2.8898°W	St Stephen: Winsham	All of Winsham; Tatworth and Forton	South Somerset

=== Deanery of Quantock ===
The deanery covers parishes in Sedgemoor and West Somerset.

Ecclesiastical parish	Benefice	Parish church	Location	Image	Civil parish(es)	District(s)
Aisholt	Aisholt, Enmore, Goathurst, Nether Stowey, Over Stowey and Spaxton with Charlynch	All Saints	51.1131°N 3.1514°W	All Saints: Aisholt	Spaxton	Sedgemoor
Enmore	Aisholt, Enmore, Goathurst, Nether Stowey, Over Stowey and Spaxton with Charlynch	St Michael	51.1111°N 3.0872°W	St Michael: Enmore	Enmore	Sedgemoor
Goathurst	Aisholt, Enmore, Goathurst, Nether Stowey, Over Stowey and Spaxton with Charlynch	St Edward King and Martyr	51.103°N 3.062°W	St Edward: Goathurst	Goathurst; Durleigh; Enmore; Spaxton	Sedgemoor
Nether Stowey	Aisholt, Enmore, Goathurst, Nether Stowey, Over Stowey and Spaxton with Charlynch	St Mary	51.1503°N 3.1498°W	St Mary: Nether Stowey	All of Nether Stowey; Fiddington; Spaxton	Sedgemoor
Over Stowey	Aisholt, Enmore, Goathurst, Nether Stowey, Over Stowey and Spaxton with Charlynch	St Peter and St Paul	51.152°N 3.154°W	St Peter and St Paul: Over Stowey	All of Over Stowey	Sedgemoor
Spaxton with Charlynch	Aisholt, Enmore, Goathurst, Nether Stowey, Over Stowey and Spaxton with Charlynch	St Margaret	51.1269°N 3.1069°W	St Margaret: Spaxton	Spaxton; Broomfield; Enmore	Sedgemoor
Cannington	Cannington Otterhampton Combwich and Stockland	St Mary	51.1502°N 3.0624°W	St Mary: Cannington	Cannington; Durleigh; Wembdon	Sedgemoor
Otterhampton with Combwich	Cannington Otterhampton Combwich and Stockland	St Peter: Combwich	51.175°N 3.0622°W	St Peter: Combwich	Otterhampton; Stockland Bristol	Sedgemoor
Stockland with Steart Bay	Cannington Otterhampton Combwich and Stockland	St Mary; St Andrew	51.1869°N 3.0884°W	St Mary: Stockland Bristol	Stockland Bristol; Otterhampton	Sedgemoor
Bicknoller	Quantock Towers	St George	51.1471°N 3.2727°W	St George: Bicknoller	Bicknoller	West Somerset
Crowcombe	Quantock Towers	Holy Ghost	51.1233°N 3.2294°W	Holy Ghost: Crowcombe	All of Crowcombe	West Somerset
Monksilver	Quantock Towers	All Saints	51.1286°N 3.3263°W	All Saints: Monksilver	All of Monksilver; Elworthy; Stogumber	West Somerset
Nettlecombe	Quantock Towers	St Mary	51.1289°N 3.3518°W	St Mary: Nettlecombe	Nettlecombe; Old Cleeve	West Somerset
Sampford Brett	Quantock Towers	St George	51.1538°N 3.3033°W	St George: Sampford Brett	Sampford Brett; Stogumber; Williton	West Somerset
Stogumber	Quantock Towers	St Mary	51.1278°N 3.2903°W	St Mary: Stogumber	Stogumber; Bicknoller; Elworthy	West Somerset
East Quantoxhead	The Quantock Coast Benefice	St Mary	51.1856°N 3.237°W	St Mary: East Quantoxhead	All of East Quantoxhead	West Somerset
Fiddington	The Quantock Coast Benefice	St Martin	51.1592°N 3.1229°W	St Martin: Fiddington	Fiddington; Spaxton	Sedgemoor
Holford with Doddington	The Quantock Coast Benefice	St Mary: Holford	51.1628°N 3.2076°W	St Mary: Holford	Holford; Kilve	West Somerset
Kilve with Kilton & Lilstock	The Quantock Coast Benefice	St Mary	51.188°N 3.2224°W	St Mary: Kilve	Kilve; Holford; Stringston	West Somerset
Stogursey	The Quantock Coast Benefice	St Andrew; St Peter	51.1795°N 3.1389°W	St Andrew: Stogursey	All of Stogursey	West Somerset
Stringston	The Quantock Coast Benefice	St Mary	51.1756°N 3.1778°W	St Mary: Stringston	Stringston	West Somerset
West Quantoxhead	The Quantock Coast Benefice	St Audries (now St Ethel Dreda)	51.1705°N 3.2696°W	St Audries: West Quantoxhead	West Quantoxhead	West Somerset
Watchet	Watchet and Williton	St Decuman; Holy Cross	51.1796°N 3.3302°W	St Decuman: Watchet	Watchet	West Somerset
Williton	Watchet and Williton	St Peter	51.118°N 3.415°W	St Peter: Williton	Williton; Watchet; West Quantoxhead	West Somerset

=== Deanery of Sedgemoor ===
The deanery covers areas of Sedgemoor around Bridgwater, and the easternmost part of Taunton Deane.

Ecclesiastical parish	Benefice	Parish church	Location	Image	Civil parish(es)	District(s)
Durston	Alfred Jewel	St John	51.0479°N 3.0126°W	St John: Durston	Durston; North Petherton	Taunton Deane, Sedgemoor
North Newton	Alfred Jewel	St Peter	51.0753°N 2.999°W	St Peter: North Newton	North Petherton	Sedgemoor
North Petherton	Alfred Jewel	St Mary	51.0922°N 3.0148°W	St Mary: North Petherton	North Petherton	Sedgemoor
Northmoor Green	Alfred Jewel	St Peter and St John; St Michaelchurch	51.0843°N 2.9491°W	St Peter & St John: Northmoor Green	North Petherton; Bridgwater Without; Westonzoyland	Sedgemoor
Thurloxton	Alfred Jewel	Church of St Giles	51.0685°N 3.0367°W	St Giles: Thurloxton	Thurloxton; North Petherton; Creech St Michael	Sedgemoor, Taunton Deane
Bridgwater: Holy Trinity	Bridgwater Holy Trinity and Durleigh Saint Hugh	Holy Trinity	51.1191°N 3.0030°W	Holy Trinity: Hamp	Bridgwater; Durleigh; North Petherton	Sedgemoor
Durleigh	Bridgwater Holy Trinity and Durleigh Saint Hugh	St Hugh	51.1199°N 3.0375°W	St Hugh: Durleigh	Durleigh; Chilton Trinity	Sedgemoor
Bridgwater: St Francis	Bridgwater St Francis	St Francis	51.1276°N 2.9814°W	–	Bridgwater; Bridgwater Without	Sedgemoor
Bridgwater: St John	Bridgwater St John	St John	51.1311°N 2.9972°W	St John: Bridgwater	Bridgwater; Bridgwater Without	Sedgemoor
Bridgwater: St Mary	Bridgwater St Mary and Chilton Trinity	St Mary	51.1279°N 3.0048°W	St Mary: Bridgwater	Bridgwater	Sedgemoor
Chilton Trinity	Bridgwater St Mary and Chilton Trinity	Holy Trinity	51.1474°N 3.0072°W	Holy Trinity: Chilton Trinity	Chilton Trinity; Wembdon	Sedgemoor
Pawlett	Puriton and Pawlett	St John	51.1788°N 3.0014°W	St John: Pawlett	All of Pawlett	Sedgemoor
Puriton	Puriton and Pawlett	St Michael and All Angels	51.1788°N 2.9735°W	St Michael: Puriton	Puriton; Bridgwater Without	Sedgemoor
Burrowbridge	The Athelney Benefice	St Michael	51.0697°N 2.9176°W	St Michael: Burrowbridge	Burrowbridge; North Petherton; Westonzoyland	Taunton Deane, Sedgemoor
Lyng	The Athelney Benefice	St Bartholomew	51.0553°N 2.9537°W	St Bartholomew: Lyng	All of Lyng	Sedgemoor
North Curry	The Athelney Benefice	St Peter & St Paul	51.0255°N 2.9719°W	St Peter & St Paul: North Curry	All of North Curry	Taunton Deane
Stoke St Gregory	The Athelney Benefice	St Gregory	51.04°N 2.9311°W	St Gregory: Stoke St Gregory	Stoke St Gregory; Burrowbridge	Taunton Deane
Wembdon	Wembdon	St George	51.1364°N 3.0172°W	St George: Wembdon	Wembdon; Bridgwater	Sedgemoor
Chedzoy	Weston Zoyland with Chedzoy	St Mary	51.1345°N 2.9429°W	St Mary: Chedzoy	Chedzoy; Bridgwater Without	Sedgemoor
Weston Zoyland	Weston Zoyland with Chedzoy	St Mary	51.1087°N 2.9264°W	St Mary: Westonzoyland	Westonzoyland; Bridgwater Without; Stawell	Sedgemoor
Bawdrip	Woolavington with Cossington and Bawdrip	St Michael and All Angels	51.1517°N 2.9429°W	St Michael: Bawdrip	All of Bawdrip; Bridgwater Without; Woolavington	Sedgemoor
Cossington	Woolavington with Cossington and Bawdrip	St Mary	51.1581°N 2.9215°W	St Mary: Cossington	All of Cossington	Sedgemoor
Woolavington	Woolavington with Cossington and Bawdrip	St Mary	51.1704°N 2.9341°W	St Mary: Woolavington	Woolavington	Sedgemoor

=== Deanery of Taunton ===
The deanery covers the area around Taunton. It is mostly within Taunton Deane and includes a small section of Sedgemoor.

Ecclesiastical parish	Benefice	Parish church	Location	Image	Civil parish(es)	District(s)
Bishop's Hull	Bishops Hull	St Peter and St Paul	51.0166°N 3.135°W	St Peter and St Paul: Bishop's Hull	Bishop's Hull; Comeytrowe; Taunton (unparished)	Taunton Deane
Creech St Michael	Creech Saint Michael and Ruishton with Thornfalcon	St Michael	51.0224°N 3.0354°W	St Michael: Creech St Michael	Creech St Michael	Taunton Deane
Ruishton	Creech Saint Michael and Ruishton with Thornfalcon	St George	51.0206°N 3.0512°W	St George: Ruishton	Ruishton; West Monkton	Taunton Deane
Thornfalcon	Creech Saint Michael and Ruishton with Thornfalcon	Holy Cross	51.0101°N 3.0229°W	Holy Cross: Thornfalcon	Thornfalcon	Taunton Deane
Galmington	Galmington	St Michael	51.0056°N 3.1218°W	St Michael: Galmington	Comeytrowe; Bishops Hull; Taunton (unparished)	Taunton Deane
St John the Evangelist, Taunton	Saint Mary Magdalene and Saint John the Evangelist	St John	51.0135°N 3.1083°W	St John: Taunton	Taunton (unparished)	Taunton Deane
Taunton: St Mary Magdalene	Saint Mary Magdalene and Saint John the Evangelist	St Mary	51.0163°N 3.1001°W	St Mary: Taunton	Taunton (unparished); Stoke St Mary	Taunton Deane
Norton Fitzwarren	Staplegrove with Norton Fitzwarren	All Saints	51.0282°N 3.1457°W	All Saints: Norton Fitzwarren	Norton Fitzwarren	Taunton Deane
Staplegrove	Staplegrove with Norton Fitzwarren	St John	51.0320°N 3.1248°W	St John: Staplegrove	Staplegrove; Taunton (unparished)	Taunton Deane
Taunton: All Saints	Taunton All Saints	All Saints	51.0204°N 3.0779°W	–	Taunton (unparished); Cheddon Fitzpaine; West Monkton	Taunton Deane
Taunton: Holy Trinity	Taunton Holy Trinity	Holy Trinity	51.0143°N 3.0910°W	Holy Trinity: Taunton	Taunton (unparished)	Taunton Deane
Taunton: St Peter, Lyngford	Taunton Lyngford: St Peter	St Peter	51.0322°N 3.0923°W	St Peter: Lyngford	Taunton (unparished); Cheddon Fitzpaine	Taunton Deane
Taunton: St Andrew	Taunton St Andrew	St Andrew	51.0255°N 3.1046°W	St Andrew: Taunton	Taunton (unparished); Cheddon Fitzpaine; Staplegrove	Taunton Deane
Taunton: St James	Taunton St James	St. James	51.018°N 3.101°W	St James: Taunton	Taunton (unparished)	Taunton Deane
Angersleigh	Trull with Angersleigh	St Michael and All Angels	50.9621°N 3.1419°W	St Michael: Angersleigh	Pitminster	Taunton Deane
Trull	Trull with Angersleigh	All Saints	50.9938°N 3.1181°W	All Saints: Trull	Trull; Comeytrowe; West Buckland; Taunton (unparished)	Taunton Deane
Broomfield	West Monkton with Kingston Saint Mary, Broomfield	St Mary & All Saints	51.0824°N 3.1088°W	St Mary & All Saints: Broomfield	All of Broomfield; Enmore; Spaxton	Sedgemoor
Cheddon Fitzpaine	West Monkton with Kingston Saint Mary, Broomfield	St Mary	51.0427°N 3.0813°W	St Mary: Cheddon Fitzpaine	Cheddon Fitzpaine; Kingston St Mary	Taunton Deane
Kingston St Mary	West Monkton with Kingston Saint Mary, Broomfield	St Mary	51.0615°N 3.1103°W	St Mary: Kingston St Mary	Kingston St Mary; Cheddon Fitzpaine; Cothelstone	Taunton Deane
West Monkton	West Monkton with Kingston Saint Mary, Broomfield	St Augustine	51.0507°N 3.0528°W	St Augustine: West Monkton	West Monkton	Taunton Deane
Wilton	Wilton	St George	51.009°N 3.1072°W	St George: Wilton	Taunton (unparished); Comeytrowe	Taunton Deane

=== Deanery of Tone ===
The deanery covers parishes in the western half of Taunton Deane and part of West Somerset.

Ecclesiastical parish	Benefice	Parish church	Location	Image	Civil parish(es)	District(s)
Bagborough	Bishop's Lydeard with Lydeard Saint Lawrence, Combe Florey and Cothelstone	St Pancras	51.0966°N 3.1888°W	St Pancras: West Bagborough	West Bagborough	Taunton Deane
Bishop's Lydeard	Bishop's Lydeard with Lydeard Saint Lawrence, Combe Florey and Cothelstone	St Mary	51.0614°N 3.1872°W	St Mary: Bishops Lydeard	Bishops Lydeard; Kingston St Mary; West Bagborough	Taunton Deane
Combe Florey	Bishop's Lydeard with Lydeard Saint Lawrence, Combe Florey and Cothelstone	St Peter & St Paul	51.0736°N 3.2139°W	St Peter & St Paul: Combe Florey	All of Combe Florey	Taunton Deane
Cothelstone	Bishop's Lydeard with Lydeard Saint Lawrence, Combe Florey and Cothelstone	St Thomas	51.0801°N 3.17°W	St Thomas: Cothelstone	Cothelstone	Taunton Deane
Lydeard St Lawrence	Bishop's Lydeard with Lydeard Saint Lawrence, Combe Florey and Cothelstone	St Lawrence	51.082°N 3.2461°W	St Lawrence: Lydeard St Lawrence	Lydeard St Lawrence	Taunton Deane
Ash Priors	Milverton with Halse, Fitzhead and Ash Priors	Holy Trinity	51.0584°N 3.2117°W	Holy Trinity: Ash Priors	Ash Priors; Bishops Lydeard; Lydeard St Lawrence	Taunton Deane
Fitzhead	Milverton with Halse, Fitzhead and Ash Priors	St James	51.0481°N 3.2571°W	St James: Fitzhead	All of Fitzhead	Taunton Deane
Halse	Milverton with Halse, Fitzhead and Ash Priors	St James	51.0425°N 3.2283°W	St James: Halse	Halse; Ash Priors	Taunton Deane
Milverton	Milverton with Halse, Fitzhead and Ash Priors	St Michael	51.0256°N 3.2537°W	St Michael: Milverton	All of Milverton; Oake; Ashbrittle	Taunton Deane
Heathfield with Cotford St. Luke	The Deane Vale Benefice	St John	51.0313°N 3.1992°W	St John: Heathfield	Oake; All of Cotford St Luke; Norton Fitzwarren	Taunton Deane
Hillfarrance	The Deane Vale Benefice	Holy Cross	51.0151°N 3.1882°W	Holy Cross: Hillfarrance	Oake; Norton Fitzwarren	Taunton Deane
Oake	The Deane Vale Benefice	St Bartholomew	51.0197°N 3.2096°W	St Bartholomew: Oake	Oake; Norton Fitzwarren	Taunton Deane
Ashbrittle	Wellington and District	St John; St Peter	50.9838°N 3.3519°W	St John: Ashbrittle	Ashbrittle; Stawley	Taunton Deane
Bathealton	Wellington and District	St Bartholomew	51.0086°N 3.3131°W	St Bartholomew: Bathealton	All of Bathealton	Taunton Deane
Bradford-on-Tone	Wellington and District	St Giles	51.0003°N 3.1797°W	St Giles: Bradford on Tone	All of Bradford on Tone; Norton Fitzwarren; West Buckland	Taunton Deane
Kittisford	Wellington and District	St Nicholas	50.9929°N 3.3148°W	St Nicholas: Kittisford	Stawley	Taunton Deane
Langford Budville	Wellington and District	St Peter	50.9988°N 3.2669°W	St Peter: Langford Budville	Langford Budville	Taunton Deane
Nynehead	Wellington and District	All Saints	50.9974°N 3.23°W	All Saints: Nynehead	Nynehead	Taunton Deane
Rockwell Green: All Saints	Wellington and District	All Saints	50.9725°N 3.2459°W	All Saints: Rockwell Green	Wellington; Wellington Without	Taunton Deane
Runnington	Wellington and District	St Peter and St Paul	50.9895°N 3.2566°W	St Peter and St Paul: Runnington	Langford Budville	Taunton Deane
Sampford Arundel	Wellington and District	Holy Cross	50.9627°N 3.2719°W	Holy Cross: Sampford Arunde	All of Sampford Arundel	Taunton Deane
Stawley	Wellington and District	St Michael	50.9955°N 3.3404°W	St Michael: Stawley	Stawley	Taunton Deane
Thorne St Margaret	Wellington and District	St Margaret	50.9822°N 3.2854°W	St Margaret: Thorne St Margaret	Wellington Without	Taunton Deane
Wellington: St John the Baptist	Wellington and District	St John	50.9788°N 3.2288°W	St John: Wellington	Wellington; Wellington Without; Nynehead	Taunton Deane
West Buckland	Wellington and District	St Mary	50.9778°N 3.1789°W	St Mary: West Buckland	West Buckland; Nynehead; Wellington	Taunton Deane
Brompton Ralph	Wiveliscombe and the Hills	St Mary	51.0831°N 3.3076°W	St Mary: Brompton Ralph	All of Brompton Ralph	West Somerset
Chipstable	Wiveliscombe and the Hills	All Saints; St Michael	51.0356°N 3.3667°W	All Saints: Chipstable	All of Chipstable; Huish Champflower	Taunton Deane, West Somerset
Clatworthy	Wiveliscombe and the Hills	St Mary	51.0699°N 3.3535°W	St Mary: Clatworthy	Clatworthy	West Somerset
Huish Champflower	Wiveliscombe and the Hills	St Peter	51.0543°N 3.358°W	St Peter: Huish Champflower	Huish Champflower	West Somerset
Tolland	Wiveliscombe and the Hills	St John	51.0828°N 3.2857°W	St John: Tolland	All of Tolland	Taunton Deane
Wiveliscombe	Wiveliscombe and the Hills	St Andrew; St Luke	51.0411°N 3.3097°W	St Andrew: Wiveliscombe	All of Wiveliscombe	Taunton Deane

== Archdeaconry of Wells ==
The archdeaconry covers the majority of Mendip, the eastern halves of Sedgemoor and South Somerset, as well as small sections in neighbouring districts in Dorset. Wells Cathedral is within the geographic extent of the archdeaconry, but is excluded from it. The Archdeacon of Wells is Anne Gell.

=== Deanery of Axbridge ===
The deanery is split between Sedgemoor and Mendip, and also includes one civil parish in North Somerset.

Ecclesiastical parish	Benefice	Parish church	Location	Image	Civil parish(es)	District(s)
Axbridge	Axbridge with Shipham and Rowberrow	St John	51.2877°N 2.8166°W	St John: Axbridge	Most of Axbridge	Sedgemoor
Rowberrow	Axbridge with Shipham and Rowberrow	St Michael and All Angels	51.324°N 2.7915°W	St Michael and All Angels: Rowberrow	Shipham; Isolated section of Priddy (dubious)	Sedgemoor, Mendip
Shipham	Axbridge with Shipham and Rowberrow	St Leonard	51.3133°N 2.8004°W	St Leonard: Shipham	Shipham; Winscombe and Sandford	Sedgemoor, North Somerset
Berrow	Berrow and Brean	St Mary	51.267°N 3.0135°W	St Bridget: Brean	All of Berrow; Brean; Burnham-on-Sea and Highbridge	Sedgemoor
Brean (LEP)	Berrow and Brean	St Bridget	51.2983°N 3.0099°W	St Bridget: Brean	Brean	Sedgemoor
Three Saints	Brent Knoll, East Brent and Lympsham	St Michael: Brent Knoll; St Mary: East Brent & St Christopher: Lympsham	51.252°N 2.9539°W	St Michael: Brent Knoll	Brent Knoll; East Brent; Lympsham; Burnham-on-Sea and Highbridge; Mark	Sedgemoor
Burnham on Sea	Burnham on Sea	St Andrew	51.2396°N 2.9981°W	St Andrew: Burnham-on-Sea	Burnham-on-Sea and Highbridge; Burnham Without	Sedgemoor
Cheddar	Cheddar, Draycott and Rodney Stoke	St Andrew	51.2737°N 2.7761°W	St Andrew: Cheddar	Cheddar, small part of Axbridge	Sedgemoor
Draycott	Cheddar, Draycott and Rodney Stoke	St Peter	51.2581°N 2.7521°W	–	Cheddar, Rodney Stoke	Mendip
Rodney Stoke	Cheddar, Draycott and Rodney Stoke	St Leonard	51.2449°N 2.7414°W	St Leonard: Rodney Stoke	Rodney Stoke	Mendip
Crook Peak	Crook Peak	St Andrew: Compton Bishop; St Andrew: Loxton; St Mary: Christon; St John: Biddisham; St Congar: Badgworth; St Gregory: Weare	51.2945°N 2.8676°W	St Andrew: Compton Bishop	All of Badgworth; All of Compton Bishop; All of Loxton; Weare; East Brent; Mark	Sedgemoor, North Somerset
Highbridge	Highbridge	St John	51.2016°N 2.9401°W	St John: Highbridge	Burnham-on-Sea and Highbridge; Burnham Without	Sedgemoor
East Huntspill	Huntspill and East Huntspill	All Saints	51.2016°N 2.9402°W	All Saints: East Huntspill	East Huntspill	Sedgemoor
Huntspill	Huntspill and East Huntspill	St Peter	51.2043°N 2.9956°W	St Peter: West Huntspill	All of West Huntspill; East Huntspill; Otterhampton; Burnham-on-Sea and Highbridge	Sedgemoor
Allerton	Mark with Allerton	Allerton Church	51.2478°N 2.8484°W	Allerton Church: Chapel Allerton	All of Chapel Allerton; Mark; Weare, Somerset	Sedgemoor
Mark	Mark with Allerton	St Mark (Holy Cross)	51.2262°N 2.8883°W	St Mark: Mark	Mark; East Brent; Burtle	Sedgemoor
Priddy	Priddy	St Lawrence	51.2597°N 2.6758°W	St Lawrence: Priddy	Priddy; St Lawrence: Priddy Chewton Mendip; St Cuthbert Out	Mendip
Blackford	Wedmore with Theale and Blackford	Holy Trinity	51.2256°N 2.8476°W	Holy Trinity: Blackford	Wedmore	Sedgemoor
Theale	Wedmore with Theale and Blackford	Christ Church	51.2114°N 2.7632°W	Christ Church: Theale	Wedmore	Sedgemoor
Wedmore	Wedmore with Theale and Blackford	St Mary	51.2277°N 2.811°W	St Mary: Wedmore	Wedmore; Isolated parts of Mark	Sedgemoor
Easton	Westbury sub Mendip with Easton	St Paul	51.2261°N 2.6983°W	St Paul: Easton	St Cuthbert Out	Mendip
Westbury sub Mendip	Westbury sub Mendip with Easton	St Lawrence	51.2353°N 2.7182°W	St Lawrence: Westbury sub Mendip	All of Westbury-sub-Mendip; Rodney Stoke	Mendip

=== Deanery of Bruton and Cary ===
The deanery is mostly in South Somerset, but includes some civil parishes in Mendip and a small part of West Dorset.

Ecclesiastical parish	Benefice	Parish church	Location	Image	Civil parish(es)	District(s)
Abbas & Templecombe	Abbas and Templecombe, Henstridge and Horsington	St Mary	51.0028°N 2.4167°W	St Mary: Abbas Combe	All of Abbas and Templecombe	South Somerset
Henstridge	Abbas and Templecombe, Henstridge and Horsington	St Nicholas	50.9766°N 2.3962°W	St Nicholas: Henstridge	All of Henstridge; Milborne Port	South Somerset
Horsington	Abbas and Templecombe, Henstridge and Horsington	St John	51.0134°N 2.4248°W	St John: Horsington	All of Horsington; Stoke Trister; Wincanton	South Somerset
Batcombe	Bruton and District Team Ministry	St Mary	51.1493°N 2.4439°W	St Mary: Batcombe	All of Batcombe	Mendip
Brewham	Bruton and District Team Ministry	St John	51.1239°N 2.4019°W	St John: South Brewham	All of Brewham	South Somerset
Bruton	Bruton and District Team Ministry	St Mary; Holy Trinity; St Peter	51.1117°N 2.4519°W	St Mary: Bruton	Bruton	South Somerset
Lamyatt	Bruton and District Team Ministry	St Mary and St John	51.1239°N 2.4853°W	St Mary and St John: Lamyat	All of Lamyatt	Mendip
Pitcombe	Bruton and District Team Ministry	St Leonard	51.0928°N 2.4685°W	St Leonard: Pitcombe	All of Pitcombe; Bruton	South Somerset
Shepton Montague	Bruton and District Team Ministry	St Peter	51.0841°N 2.4553°W	St Peter: Shepton Montague	All of Shepton Montague; Charlton Musgrove	South Somerset
Upton Noble	Bruton and District Team Ministry	St Mary Magdalene	51.1572°N 2.4119°W	St Mary: Upton Noble	All of Upton Noble	Mendip
Corton Denham	Cam Vale	St Andrew	51.0016°N 2.5202°W	St Andrew: Corton Denham	Corton Denham; Sandford Orcas	South Somerset, West Dorset
Queen Camel	Cam Vale	St Barnabas	51.0219°N 2.5739°W	St Barnabas: Queen Camel	Queen Camel; Marston Magna	South Somerset
Sparkford	Cam Vale	St Mary	51.029°N 2.5589°W	St Mary: Sparkford	Sparkford; Queen Camel	South Somerset
Sutton Montis	Cam Vale	Holy Trinity	51.0208°N 2.5369°W	Holy Trinity: Sutton Montis	South Cadbury and Sutton Montis (CP recently renamed)	South Somerset
West Camel	Cam Vale	All Saints	51.0183°N 2.5981°W	All Saints: West Camel	All of West Camel	South Somerset
Weston Bampfylde	Cam Vale	Holy Cross	51.0225°N 2.5566°W	Holy Cross: Weston Bampfylde	Sparkford	South Somerset
Blackford	Camelot Parishes	St Michael	51.0337°N 2.4891°W	St Michael: Blackford	Compton Pauncefoot	South Somerset
Bratton St. Maur	Camelot Parishes	St Nicholas	51.0691°N 2.4622°W	St Nicholas: Bratton Seymour	All of Bratton Seymour	South Somerset
Compton Pauncefoot	Camelot Parishes	St Mary	51.0337°N 2.5090°W	St Mary: Compton Pauncefoot	Compton Pauncefoot	South Somerset
Holton	Camelot Parishes	St Nicholas	51.0401°N 2.4503°W	St Nicholas: Holton	Holton; Wincanton	South Somerset
Maperton	Camelot Parishes	St Peter and St Paul	51.0338°N 2.4690°W	St Peter and St Paul: Maperton	All of Maperton	South Somerset
North Cadbury	Camelot Parishes	St Michael	51.0417°N 2.5214°W	St Michael: North Cadbury	All of North Cadbury	South Somerset
North Cheriton	Camelot Parishes	St John	51.0309°N 2.4474°W	St John: North Cheriton	North Cheriton; Holton	South Somerset
South Cadbury	Camelot Parishes	Thomas Becket	51.0274°N 2.5261°W	Thomas Becket: South Cadbury	South Cadbury and Sutton Montis (CP recently renamed)	South Somerset
Yarlington	Camelot Parishes	St Mary	51.0621°N 2.4941°W	St Mary: Yarlington	All of Yarlington	South Somerset
Ansford	Castle Cary with Ansford	St Andrew	51.0943°N 2.518°W	St Andrew: Ansford	Ansford	South Somerset
Castle Cary	Castle Cary with Ansford	All Saints	51.0867°N 2.5167°W	All Saints: Castle Cary	All of Castle Cary; Ansford; North Barrow	South Somerset
Charlton Musgrove	Charlton Musgrove, Cucklington and Stoke Trister	St Stephen; St John	51.0678°N 2.4008°W	St Stephen: Charlton Musgrove	Charlton Musgrove; Wincanton	South Somerset
Cucklington	Charlton Musgrove, Cucklington and Stoke Trister	St Lawrence	51.0488°N 2.3506°W	St Lawrence: Cucklington	Cucklington; Penselwood	South Somerset
Stoke Trister	Charlton Musgrove, Cucklington and Stoke Trister	St Andrew	51.0575°N 2.3770°W	St Andrew: Stoke Trister	Stoke Trister	South Somerset
Evercreech	Evercreech with Chesterblade and Milton Clevedon	St Peter; St Mary	51.1462°N 2.5027°W	St Peter: Evercreech	All of Evercreech	Mendip
Milton Clevedon	Evercreech with Chesterblade and Milton Clevedon	St James	51.1383°N 2.4808°W	St James: Milton Clevedon	All of Milton Clevedon	Mendip
Charlton Horethorne with Stowell	Milborne Port with Goathill & Charlton Horethorne	St Peter and St Paul; St Mary Magdalene	51.0061°N 2.4785°W	St Peter and St Paul: Charlton Horethorne	All of Charlton Horethorne	South Somerset
Goathill	Milborne Port with Goathill & Charlton Horethorne	St Peter	50.9535°N 2.4630°W	St Peter: Goathill	All of Goathill	West Dorset
Milborne Port (LEP)	Milborne Port with Goathill & Charlton Horethorne	St John the Evangelist; Milborne Wick Mission Church	50.9665°N 2.461°W	St John: Milborne Port	Milborne Port; Corton Denham	South Somerset
Penselwood	Pen Selwood	St Michael	51.0820°N 2.3496°W	St Michael: Penselwood	Penselwood; Stoke Trister	South Somerset
Alford	Six Pilgrims	All Saints	51.0914°N 2.5661°W	All Saints: Alford	Alford; Ditcheat	South Somerset, Mendip
Babcary	Six Pilgrims	Holy Cross	51.0566°N 2.6271°W	Holy Cross: Babcary	All of Babcary	South Somerset
Hornblotton	Six Pilgrims	St Peter	51.1046°N 2.5835°W	St Peter: Hornblotton	West Bradley	Mendip
Lovington	Six Pilgrims	St Thomas	51.0754°N 2.5771°W	St Thomas: Lovington	Lovington	South Somerset
North Barrow	Six Pilgrims	St Nicholas	51.0624°N 2.5608°W	St Nicholas: North Barrow	North Barrow; Isolated part of Compton Pauncefoot	South Somerset
South Barrow	Six Pilgrims	St Peter	51.049°N 2.5694°W	St Peter: South Barrow	All of South Barrow	South Somerset
Wincanton	Wincanton	St Peter and St Paul	51.055°N 2.4136°W	St Peter and St Paul: Wincanton	Wincanton; Charlton Musgrove	South Somerset

=== Deanery of Frome ===
The deanery covers areas of Mendip around Frome.

Ecclesiastical parish	Benefice	Parish church	Location	Image	Civil parish(es)	District(s)
Beckington with Standerwick	Beckington with Standerwick Berkley Rodden etc.	St George	51.2635°N 2.2855°W	St George: Beckington	Beckington; Berkley	Mendip
Berkley	Beckington with Standerwick Berkley Rodden etc.	St Mary	51.2436°N 2.2719°W	St Mary: Berkley	Berkley; Beckington; Selwood; Frome	Mendip
Lullington with Orchardleigh	Beckington with Standerwick Berkley Rodden etc.	All Saints; Church of St Mary	51.2663°N 2.312°W	All Saints: Lullington	Lullington	Mendip
Rodden	Beckington with Standerwick Berkley Rodden etc.	All Saints	51.2283°N 2.2895°W	–	Selwood; Frome	Mendip
Frome: Christ Church	Christ Church with Saint Mary's Frome	Christ Church	51.2295°N 2.326°W	Christ Church: Frome	Frome; Selwood	Mendip
Frome: St Mary	Christ Church with Saint Mary's Frome	St Mary	51.2296°N 2.3259°W	St Mary: Frome	Frome; Berkley; Selwood	Mendip
Frome: Holy Trinity	Frome (Holy Trinity)	Holy Trinity	51.2338°N 2.328°W	Holy Trinity: Frome	Frome; Selwood	Mendip
Frome St John	Frome (St John the Baptist)	St John	51.2297°N 2.3206°W	St John: Frome	Frome; Selwood	Mendip
Hardington Vale	Hardington Vale	St Mary; All Saints; St Mary; St Lawrence; St Leonard; St Philip and St James	51.2754°N 2.3907°W	St Mary: Hemington	All of Hemington; Lullington; Norton St Philip; Rode; Tellisford	Mendip
Leigh-on-Mendip	Leigh upon Mendip with Stoke St Michael	St Giles; All Saints	51.2239°N 2.4416°W	St Giles: Leigh-on-Mendip	All of Leigh-on-Mendip; All of Downhead; Cranmore	Mendip
Stoke St Michael	Leigh upon Mendip with Stoke St Michael	St Michael	51.221°N 2.4819°W	St Michael: Stoke St Michael	Stoke St Michael	Mendip
Buckland Dinham	Mells with Buckland Dinham, Elm, Whatley etc.	St Michael	51.26°N 2.3524°W	St Michael: Buckland Dinham	All of Buckland Dinham	Mendip
Chantry	Mells with Buckland Dinham, Elm, Whatley etc.	Holy Trinity	51.227°N 2.3822°W	Holy Trinity: Chantry	Whatley; Mells	Mendip
Elm	Mells with Buckland Dinham, Elm, Whatley etc.	St Mary	51.2422°N 2.3632°W	St Mary: Great Elm	All of Great Elm	Mendip
Mells with Vobster	Mells with Buckland Dinham, Elm, Whatley etc.	St Andrew's Church	51.2419°N 2.3905°W	St Andrew: Mells	Mells; Kilmersdon	Mendip
Whatley	Mells with Buckland Dinham, Elm, Whatley etc.	St George	51.2269°N 2.3822°W	St George: Whatley	Whatley	Mendip
Postlebury	Postlebury	All Saints; St Mary, St John and All Saints; St Leonard; St Mary; St Mary	51.2099°N 2.3771°W	All Saints: Nunney	All of Nunney all of Trudoxhill; All of Wanstrow; All of Witham Priory; Selwood	Mendip
Woodlands	Woodlands	St Katherine	51.1958°N 2.3014°W	St Katherine: East Woodlands	Selwood	Mendip

=== Deanery of Glastonbury ===
The deanery covers parishes in several districts around Glastonbury and Street on the Somerset Levels.

Ecclesiastical parish	Benefice	Parish church	Location	Image	Civil parish(es)	District(s)
Baltonsborough	Baltonsborough with Butleigh, West Bradley and West Pennard (known as the Brue Benefice)	St Dunstan	51.1106°N 2.656°W	St Dunstan: Baltonsborough	Baltonsborough	Mendip
Butleigh	Baltonsborough with Butleigh, West Bradley and West Pennard	St Leonard	51.1025°N 2.6869°W	St Leonard: Butleigh	Butleigh; Walton	Mendip
West Bradley with Lottisham	Baltonsborough with Butleigh, West Bradley and West Pennard	St Andrew: West Bradley; St Mary: Lottisham	51.1294°N 2.6333°W	St Andrew: West Bradley	All of West Bradley; Baltonsborough; West Pennard	Mendip
West Pennard	Baltonsborough with Butleigh, West Bradley and West Pennard	St Nicholas	51.1412°N 2.6397°W	St Nicholas: West Pennard	West Pennard	Mendip
Glastonbury: St Benedict	Glastonbury St. John the Baptist and St. Benedict	St Benedict	51.1467°N 2.7197°W	St Benedict: Glastonbury	Glastonbury; Butleigh; Sharpham; St Benedict: Glastonbury Street	Mendip
Glastonbury: St John the Baptist	Glastonbury St. John the Baptist and St. Benedict	St John	51.1482°N 2.7162°W	St John: Glastonbury	Glastonbury; Meare	Mendip
Meare	Glastonbury St. John the Baptist and St. Benedict	St Mary	51.1718°N 2.7789°W	St Mary: Meare	Meare; Godney	Mendip
Greinton	Middlezoy with Othery, Moorlinch and Greinton	St Michael & All Angels	51.1233°N 2.8405°W	St Michael & All Angels: Greinton	All of Greinton; Ashcott	Sedgemoor
Middlezoy	Middlezoy with Othery, Moorlinch and Greinton	Holy Cross	51.0939°N 2.8942°W	Holy Cross: Middlezoy	All of Middlezoy; Othery	Sedgemoor
Moorlynch	Middlezoy with Othery, Moorlinch and Greinton	St Mary; St Francis	51.128°N 2.8616°W	St Mary: Moorlinch	Moorlinch; Stawell	Sedgemoor
Othery	Middlezoy with Othery, Moorlinch and Greinton	St Michael	51.0806°N 2.883°W	St Michael: Othery	Othery; Burrowbridge	Sedgemoor, Taunton Deane
Compton Dundon	Street with Walton and Compton Dundon	St Andrew	51.0897°N 2.7447°W	St Andrew: Compton Dundon	Compton Dundon	South Somerset
Street	Street with Walton and Compton Dundon	Holy Trinity; Mission Church	51.1313°N 2.7329°W	Holy Trinity: Street	Street; Butleigh; Sharpham	Mendip
Walton	Street with Walton and Compton Dundon	Holy Trinity	51.1236°N 2.7710°W	Holy Trinity: Walton	Walton	Mendip
Polden Wheel	The Polden Wheel	St Edward; All Saints; St George; St Peter; St Philip and St James; St Mary	51.1559°N 2.8971°W	St Edward: Chilton Polden	All of Catcott; All of Chilton Polden; All of Edington, Somerset; All of Shapwick; Ashcott; Burtle; Moorlinch; Stawell	Sedgemoor
Barton St David	Wheathill	St David	51.0827°N 2.6585°W	St David: Barton St David	Barton St David; Keinton Mandeville	South Somerset
Keinton Mandeville with Kingweston	Wheathill	St Mary: Keinton Mandeville; All Saints: Kingweston	51.0681°N 2.6468°W	St Mary: Keinton Mandeville	Keinton Mandeville; All of Kingweston; Barton St David	South Somerset
Lydford on Fosse	Wheathill	St Peter	51.0846°N 2.6227°W	St Peter: Lydford on Fosse	Lydford-on-Fosse; Lovington	Mendip, South Somerset

=== Deanery of Ivelchester ===
The deanery covers parishes in South Somerset.

Ecclesiastical parish	Benefice	Parish church	Location	Image	Civil parish(es)	District(s)
Curry Rivel	Curry Rivel with Fivehead and Swell	St Andrew	51.0247°N 2.8678°W	St Andrew: Curry Rivel	Curry Rivel; Drayton; Hambridge and Westport	South Somerset
Fivehead	Curry Rivel with Fivehead and Swell	St Martin	51.0017°N 2.9228°W	St Martin: Fivehead	Fivehead	South Somerset
Swell	Curry Rivel with Fivehead and Swell	St Catherine	51.0083°N 2.9003°W	St Catherine: Swell	Fivehead	South Somerset
Ilchester with Northover	Ilchester with Northover, Limington, Yeovilton etc.	St Mary Major	51.0009°N 2.6818°W	St Mary: Ilchester	Ilchester; Tintinhull	South Somerset
Limington	Ilchester with Northover, Limington, Yeovilton etc.	St Mary	50.9972°N 2.6533°W	St Mary: Limington	All of Limington	South Somerset
Yeovilton with Podimore	Ilchester with Northover, Limington, Yeovilton etc.	St Peter: Podimore	51.0217°N 2.6492°W	St Peter: Podimore	Yeovilton	South Somerset
Aller	Langport Area Team Ministry	St Andrew	51.0554°N 2.8627°W	St Andrew: Aller	All of Aller	South Somerset
Drayton	Langport Area Team Ministry	St Catherine	51.0194°N 2.8492°W	St Catherine: Drayton	Drayton; Curry Rivel	South Somerset
High Ham with Low Ham	Langport Area Team Ministry	St Andrew: High Ham	51.0764°N 2.8217°W	St Andrew: High Ham	High Ham	South Somerset
Huish Episcopi cum Langport	Langport Area Team Ministry	St Mary: Huish Episcopi	51.0358°N 2.8181°W	St Mary: Huish Episcopi	All of Huish Episcopi; All of Langport, High Ham	South Somerset
Long Load	Langport Area Team Ministry	Christ Church	51.004°N 2.7631°W	Christ Church: Long Load	All of Long Load	South Somerset
Long Sutton	Langport Area Team Ministry	Holy Trinity	51.0328°N 2.7564°W	Holy Trinity: Long Sutton	Long Sutton; Somerton	South Somerset
Muchelney	Langport Area Team Ministry	St Peter and St Paul	51.0206°N 2.815°W	St Peter and St Paul: Muchelney	All of Muchelney	South Somerset
Pitney	Langport Area Team Ministry	St John	51.0529°N 2.7935°W	St John: Pitney	Pitney	South Somerset
Ash	Martock with Kingsbury Episocpi & Ash	Holy Trinity	50.9835°N 2.7528°W	Holy Trinity: Ash	Ash	South Somerset
Kingsbury Episcopi	Martock with Kingsbury Episocpi & Ash	St Martin	50.9856°N 2.8028°W	St Martin: Kingsbury Episcopi	Kingsbury Episcopi	South Somerset
Martock	Martock with Kingsbury Episocpi & Ash	All Saints	50.9694°N 2.7689°W	All Saints: Martock	Martock; Ash	South Somerset
Chiselborough	Norton-sub-Hamdon, West Chinnock, Chiselborough and Middle Chinnock	St Peter and St Paul	50.9308°N 2.7591°W	St Peter and St Paul: Chiselborough	All of Chiselborough	South Somerset
Middle Chinnock	Norton-sub-Hamdon, West Chinnock, Chiselborough and Middle Chinnock	St Margaret	50.9152°N 2.7522°W	St Margaret: Milddle Chinnock	West and Middle Chinnock	South Somerset
Norton-sub-Hamdon	Norton-sub-Hamdon, West Chinnock, Chiselborough and Middle Chinnock	St Mary	50.94°N 2.7536°W	St Mary: Norton-sub-Hamdon	Norton-sub-Hamdon	South Somerset
West Chinnock	Norton-sub-Hamdon, West Chinnock, Chiselborough and Middle Chinnock	St Mary	50.9168°N 2.7588°W	St Mary: West Chinnock	West Chinnock	South Somerset
Kingsdon	Somerton with the Charltons and Kingsdon	All Saints	51.0331°N 2.692°W	All Saints: Kingsdon	Kingsdon	South Somerset
Somerton	Somerton with the Charltons and Kingsdon	St Michael and All Angels	51.0544°N 2.7269°W	St Michael and All Angels: Somerton	Somerton; High Ham; Kingsdon; Long Sutton	South Somerset
The Charltons	Somerton with the Charltons and Kingsdon	St Mary: Charlton Mackrell; St Peter and St Paul: Charlton Adam	51.0524°N 2.6744°W	St Peter and St Paul: Charlton Adam	All of Charlton Mackrell; Compton Dundon	South Somerset
Stoke-sub-Hamdon	Stoke sub Hamdon	St Mary	50.9519°N 2.7353°W	St Mary: Stoke-sub-Hamdon	All of Stoke-sub-Hamdon	South Somerset

=== Deanery of Shepton Mallet ===
The deanery covers parishes in the Mendip area.

Ecclesiastical parish	Benefice	Parish church	Location	Image	Civil parish(es)	District(s)
Ashwick	Ashwick with Oakhill and Binegar	St James	51.2339°N 2.5212°W	St Janes: Ashwick	Ashwick; Chilcompton; Stratton on the Fosse	Mendip
Binegar	Ashwick with Oakhill and Binegar	Holy Trinity	51.243°N 2.5523°W	Holy Trinity: Binegar	Binegar; Ashwick; Chilcompton; Emborough; St Cuthbert Out	Mendip
Oakhill	Ashwick with Oakhill and Binegar	All Saints	51.2235°N 2.5227°W	–	Ashwick; Stoke St Michael	Mendip
Chewton Mendip with Emborough	Chewton Mendip with Ston Easton Litton etc.	St Mary:Chewton Mendip	51.2761°N 2.5799°W	St Mary: Chewton Mendip	Chewton Mendip; Emborough; Binegar; Chilcompton; Ston Easton	Mendip
Litton	Chewton Mendip with Ston Easton Litton etc.	St Mary	51.2899°N 2.583°W	St Mary: Litton	All of Litton	Mendip
Ston Easton	Chewton Mendip with Ston Easton Litton etc.	St Mary	51.2789°N 2.5408°W	St Mary: Ston Easton	Ston Easton; Chilcompton	Mendip
Coxley with Godney	Coxley with Godney, Henton and Wookey	Christ Church: Coxley	51.1870°N 2.6794°W	Christ Church: Coxley	St Cuthbert Out; Godney; Wookey	Mendip
Henton	Coxley with Godney, Henton and Wookey	Christ Church	51.2058°N 2.7265°W	Christ Church: Henton	Wookey; Godney	Mendip
Wookey	Coxley with Godney, Henton and Wookey	St Matthew	51.2093°N 2.6893°W	St Matthew: Wookey	Wookey; St Cuthbert Out	Mendip
Ditcheat	Fosse Trinity	St Mary; Mission Church	51.125°N 2.5361°W	St Mary: Ditcheat	All of Ditcheat	Mendip
East Pennard	Fosse Trinity	All Saints	51.1352°N 2.5782°W	All Saints: East Pennard	East Pennard	Mendip
Pylle	Fosse Trinity	Thomas à Becket	51.1429°N 2.5631°W	St Thomas: Pylle	All of Pylle	Mendip
Croscombe	Pilton with Croscombe, North Wootton and Dinder	St Mary	51.1974°N 2.5872°W	St Mary: Croscombe	Croscombe	Mendip
Dinder	Pilton with Croscombe, North Wootton and Dinder	St Michael	51.199°N 2.6094°W	St Michael: Dinder	St Cuthbert Out	Mendip
North Wootton	Pilton with Croscombe, North Wootton and Dinder	St Peter	51.1738°N 2.6254°W	St Peter: North Wootton	North Wootton; St Cuthbert Out	Mendip
Pilton	Pilton with Croscombe, North Wootton and Dinder	St John	51.165°N 2.5898°W	St John: Pilton	Pilton; North Wootton	Mendip
Doulting	Shepton Mallet with Doulting	St Aldhelm; St Bartholomew	51.1859°N 2.5058°W	St Aldhelm: Doulting	All of Doulting; Cranmore	Mendip
Shepton Mallet	Shepton Mallet with Doulting	St Peter and St Paul	51.191°N 2.5457°W	St Peter and St Paul: Shepton Mallet	All of Shepton Mallet; Ashwick; Croscombe; Pilton	Mendip
Wells: St Cuthbert	Wells St Cuthbert with Wookey Hole	St Cuthbert	51.2083°N 2.6503°W	St Cuthbert: Wells	Wells; St Cuthbert Out	Mendip
Wookey Hole	Wells St Cuthbert with Wookey Hole	St Mary	51.2250°N 2.6710°W	St Mary: Wookey Hole	St Cuthbert Out	Mendip
Wells; St Thomas with Horrington	Wells St Thomas with Horrington	St Thomas	51.2129°N 2.637°W	St Thomas: Wells	Wells; St Cuthbert Out	Mendip

=== Deanery of Yeovil ===
The deanery includes parishes in South Somerset.

Ecclesiastical parish	Benefice	Parish church	Location	Image	Civil parish(es)	District(s)
Ashington	Chilton Cantelo, Ashington, Mudford, Rimpton etc.	St Vincent	50.9938°N 2.6255°W	St Vincent: Ashington	Chilton Cantelo	South Somerset
Chilton Cantelo	Chilton Cantelo, Ashington, Mudford, Rimpton etc.	St James	50.9974°N 2.6138°W	St James: Chilton Cantelo	Chilton Cantelo; Yeovilton	South Somerset
Marston Magna	Chilton Cantelo, Ashington, Mudford, Rimpton etc.	St Mary	50.9986°N 2.5794°W	St Mary: Marston Magna	Marston Magna	South Somerset
Mudford	Chilton Cantelo, Ashington, Mudford, Rimpton etc.	St Mary	50.9769°N 2.6075°W	St Mary: Mudford	Mudford	South Somerset
Rimpton	Chilton Cantelo, Ashington, Mudford, Rimpton etc.	St Mary	50.9942°N 2.555°W	St Mary: Rimpton	All of Rimpton	South Somerset
Brympton	Odcombe Brympton Lufton and Montacute	St Andrew	50.935°N 2.6839°W	St Andrew: Brympton	Brympton	South Somerset
Lufton	Odcombe Brympton Lufton and Montacute	St Peter & St Paul	50.9491°N 2.6918°W	St Peter & St Paul: Lufton	Brympton	South Somerset
Montacute	Odcombe Brympton Lufton and Montacute	St Catherine	50.9497°N 2.7178°W	St Catherine: Montacute	Montacute; Norton-sub-Hamdon	South Somerset
Odcombe	Odcombe Brympton Lufton and Montacute	St Peter and St Paul	50.9365°N 2.7031°W	St Peter and St Paul: Odcombe	Odcombe; Brympton	South Somerset
Preston Plucknett	Preston Plucknett	St James; St Peter	50.9436°N 2.6636°W	St James: Preston Plucknett	Brympton; Yeovil; Yeovil Without	South Somerset
Closworth	The Coker Ridge	All Saints: Closworth	50.8884°N 2.6213°W	All Saints: Closworth	Closworth	South Somerset
East Chinnock	The Coker Ridge	St Mary	50.9165°N 2.7146°W	St Mary: East Chinnock	All of East Chinnock; Odcombe	South Somerset
East Coker	The Coker Ridge	St Michael and All Angels	50.9073°N 2.6573°W	St Michael: East Coker	East Coker; Closworth	South Somerset
Hardington Mandeville	The Coker Ridge	St Mary	50.9048°N 2.6949°W	St Mary: Hardington Mandeville	All of Hardington Mandeville	South Somerset
Pendomer	The Coker Ridge	St Roch	50.891°N 2.6819°W	St Roch: Pendomer	Closworth	South Somerset
Sutton Bingham	The Coker Ridge	All Saints	50.8975°N 2.6436°W	All Saints: Sutton Bingham	Closworth	South Somerset
West Coker	The Coker Ridge	St Martin of Tours	50.9196°N 2.6891°W	St Martin: West Coker	West Coker	South Somerset
Chilthorne Domer	Tintinhull, Chilthorne Domer, Yeovil Marsh & Thorne Coffin	St Mary	50.9723°N 2.6781°W	St Mary: Chilthorne Domer	All of Chilthorne Domer	South Somerset
Thorne Coffin	Tintinhull, Chilthorne Domer, Yeovil Marsh & Thorne Coffin	St Andrew	50.9559°N 2.6762°W	St Andrew: Thorne Coffin	Brympton	South Somerset
Tintinhull	Tintinhull, Chilthorne Domer, Yeovil Marsh & Thorne Coffin	St Margaret	50.9744°N 2.7158°W	St Margaret: Tintinhull	Tintinhull	South Somerset
Yeovil Marsh: All Saints	Tintinhull, Chilthorne Domer, Yeovil Marsh & Thorne Coffin	All Saints	50.9669°N 2.6509°W	All Saints: Yeovil Marsh	Yeovil Without; Mudford	South Somerset
Barwick	Yeovil Holy Trinity with Barwick	St Mary	50.9225°N 2.6299°W	St Mary: Barwick	Barwick	South Somerset
Yeovil: Holy Trinity	Yeovil Holy Trinity with Barwick	Holy Trinity	50.9338°N 2.6515°W	–	Yeovil; Barwick; East Coker; West Coker	South Somerset
Yeovil: St Michael & All Angels	Yeovil St Michael & All Angels	St Michael & All Angels	50.9472°N 2.6200°W	St Michael: Yeovil	Yeovil; Yeovil Without	South Somerset
Yeovil with Kingston Pitney	Yeovil with Kingston Pitney	St John: Yeovil; St Andrew: Yeovil	50.9417°N 2.6314°W	St John: Yeovil	Yeovil; Yeovil Without	South Somerset

== Extra-parochial areas ==
The area of central Wells, forming Wells St Andrew, a liberty around the cathedral and the Bishop's Palace is the only extra-parochial area within the diocese.

Ecclesiastical parish	Benefice	Parish church	Location	Image	Civil parish(es)	District(s)
St Andrew Extra Parochial Place	None	None	51.2104°N 2.642°W	Wells Cathedral	Wells	Mendip
