= Church of St Lawrence, Priddy =

Church in Somerset, England

Church of St Lawrence
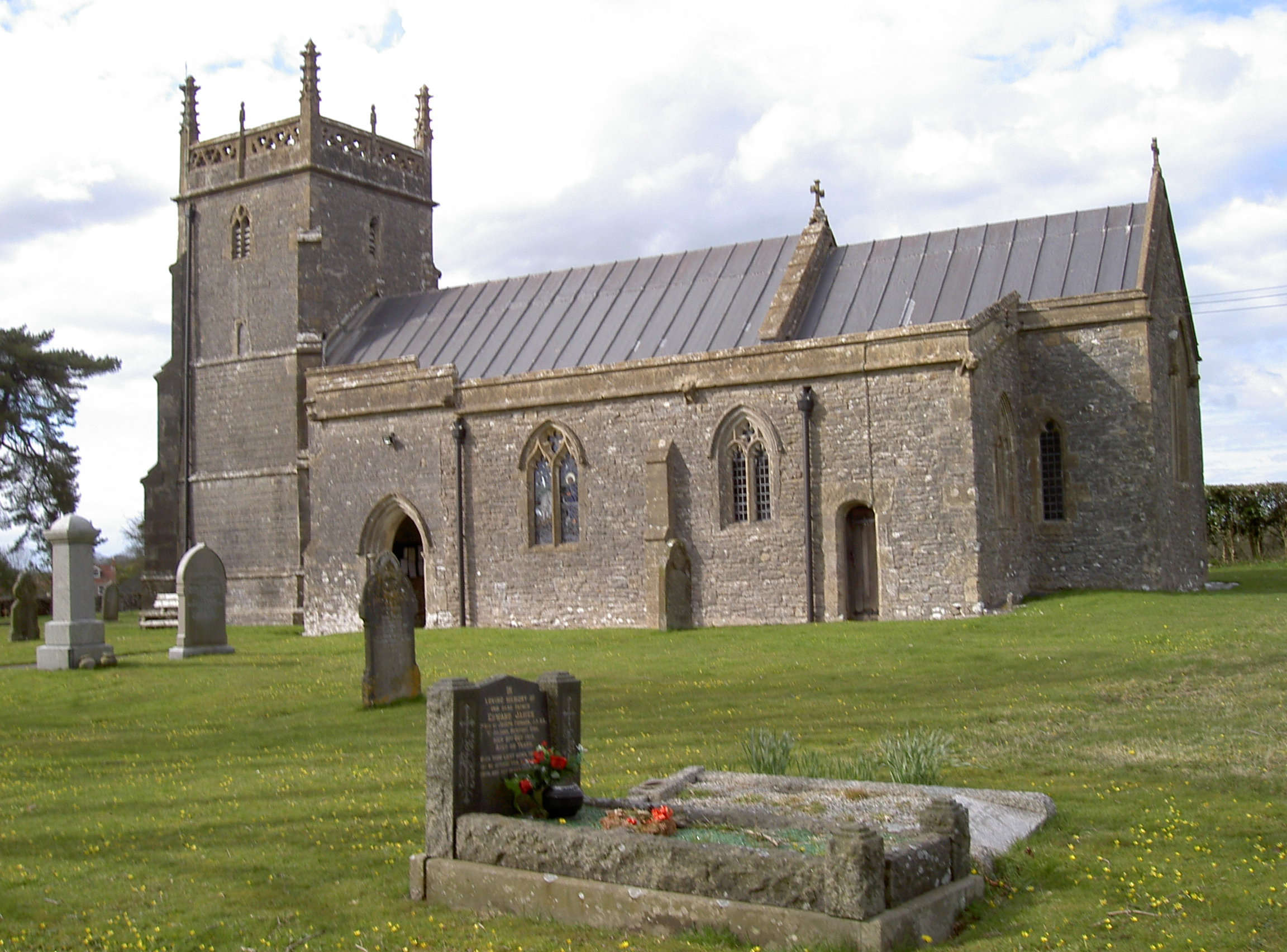

- Location within Somerset

General information
- Location: Priddy, England
- Coordinates: 51.2597°N 2.6774°W
- Completed: 13th century

The Anglican Church of St Lawrence at Priddy, Somerset, England, dates from the 13th century, with some rebuilding in the 15th century and was restored in 1881–88; it is a Grade I listed building.

The church was dedicated to St Lawrence on 10 August 1352. By the 19th century the church was in a bad state of repair, with water coming in through the roof; it underwent extensive restoration including repairs to the tower. During the process a memorial stone commemorating repairs carried out following the Great Storm of 1703.

The church has a nave, chancel, north aisle, north and south transepts and a south porch. The three-stage west tower is supported by diagonal buttresses. The three bells in the church were augmented to five in 1997. The church includes a medieval altar frontal.

The interior includes 15th century rood and parclose screens and stone pulpit at the remains of the rood stair. The Baptismal font is Norman. The pews and other woodwork were all renewed in the 19th century. A silver-gilt chalice from 1573, owned by the church is kept in a bank vault. A 15th century altar frontal of irises on Italian brocade is now preserved in a glass case.

The church is surrounded by a circular churchyard which predates the building.

The benefice of Priddy is part of the Diocese of Bath and Wells.

== See also ==
- List of Grade I listed buildings in Mendip
- List of towers in Somerset
- List of ecclesiastical parishes in the Diocese of Bath and Wells
