= St Andrew's Church, Whitestaunton =

Church in Somerset, England

Church of St Andrew
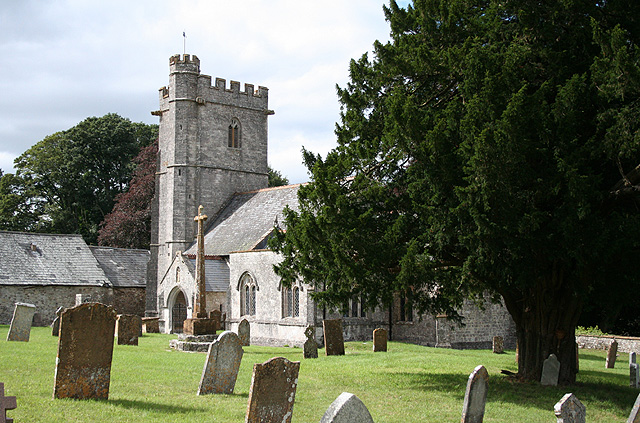

- Location within Somerset
- 50°53′20″N 3°01′21″W
- Location: Whitestaunton, Somerset, England

History
- Built: 13th century

Listed Building – Grade I
- Official name: Church of St Andrew
- Designated: 4 February 1958
- Reference no.: 1263098

The Church of St Andrew in Whitestaunton, Somerset, England, dates from the 13th century and has been designated as a Grade I listed building.

The Perpendicular church is built of Hamstone. It contains a nave and porch which were added in the late 14th century and in the late 15th century it was refenestrated and the north and south chapels added. In the early 16th century the tower and chancel arch were rebuilt, the south chapel widened and the west door added. Further restoration followed in 1882-3 and 1913.

The interior includes a Norman font.

In 2012 an appeal was launched to repair the bellframe in the tower.

== See also ==
- List of Grade I listed buildings in South Somerset
- List of towers in Somerset
- List of ecclesiastical parishes in the Diocese of Bath and Wells
