= Church of St Peter and St Paul, Chiselborough =

Church in Somerset, England

Church of St Peter and St Paul
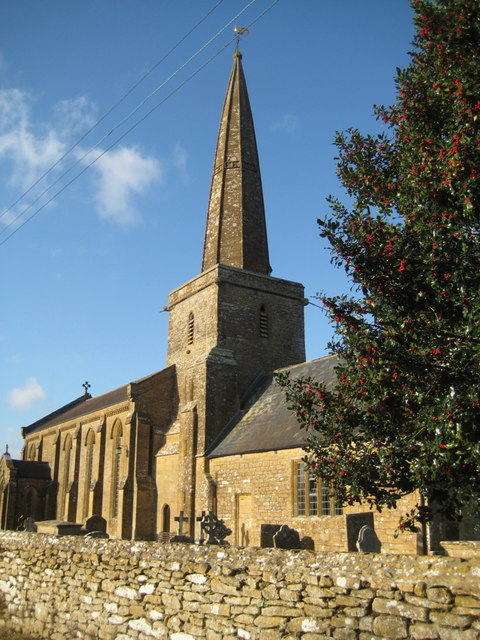

- Location within Somerset
- 50.9308°N 2.7591°W
- Location: Chiselborough, Somerset, England

History
- Built: 12th century

Listed Building – Grade II*
- Official name: Church of St Peter and St Paul
- Designated: 19 April 1961
- Reference no.: 1345758

The Anglican Church of St Peter and St Paul in Chiselborough, Somerset, England was built in the 12th century. It is a Grade II* listed building.

== History ==
The church was built in the 12th century, with parts of the original fabric being included in later work. In the 17th, the chancel was added. In 1842 a Victorian restoration included rebuilding of the nave.

The parish is part of the Ham Hill benefice within the Diocese of Bath and Wells.

== Architecture ==
The hamstone building has Welsh slate roofs. It consists of a five-bay nave and a two-bay chancel. The two-stage tower has a low parapet and short octagonal spire. The central tower is decorated with gargoyles. The tower includes a bell that was cast in 1363.

The interior has mostly 19th century fittings, but the font is believed to date from the 15th century. One of the stained glass windows which was installed in 1988, is made up of 99 panes dedicated to the children of the village.

== See also ==
- List of ecclesiastical parishes in the Diocese of Bath and Wells
