= Simon Hill (priest) =

English Anglican priest (born 1964)

Simon James Hill (born 1964) has been Archdeacon of Taunton since 1 October 2016.

Hill was educated at the University of Sheffield and Ripon College Cuddesdon. He was ordained deacon in 1995, and priest in 1996. After a curacy at St James the Great, Manston, he was Team Vicar at St Peter and St Paul, Dorchester. He was Director of the Berinsfield Programme at Cuddesdon from 1998 to 2003; Rector of St Andrew's Church, Backwell from 2003 to 2010; and Director of Clergy Development for the Diocese of Bath and Wells from then until his appointment as Archdeacon.
