= All Saints' Church, Yeovil Marsh =

Church in Somerset, England

All Saints Church
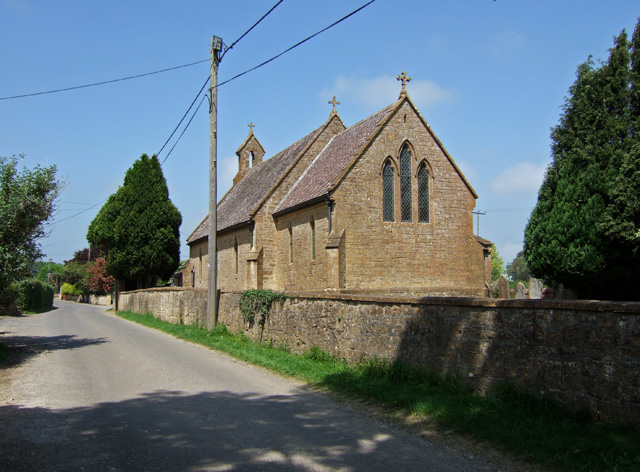

Religion
- Affiliation: Church of England
- Ecclesiastical or organizational status: Active
- Year consecrated: 1871

Location
- Location: Yeovil Marsh, Somerset, England
- Interactive map of All Saints Church
- Coordinates: 50.9670°N 2.6506°W

Architecture
- Architect: Charles Benson
- Type: Church

All Saints Church is a Church of England church in Yeovil Marsh, Somerset, England. It was designed by Charles Benson and built at the expense of George Bullock in 1869–70. Today the church forms part of the Five Crosses benefice.

== History ==
All Saints was built as a chapel of ease to St John's in Yeovil. A church serving Yeovil Marsh and its surrounding neighbourhood had been under discussion since earlier in the 19th century, but did not come to fruition. Instead services were held at a small thatched cottage at Yeovil Marsh by Rev. Mr. James, curate of St John's, then his successor Rev. A. H. Lutman.

All Saints was built at the expense of Mr. George Bullock of East Coker, the principal landowner of the Marsh district. He spent almost £2,000 to acquire the site, build the church and provide an endowment of £1,000 and building fund of £197. Plans for the church were drawn up by Mr. Charles Benson of Yeovil and Messrs. William Pudden and Sons of East Coker hired as the builders.

The foundation stone was laid in January 1869 and the Taunton Courier reported the church as "approaching completion" in September 1869. It opened in 1870 and was consecrated by the Bishop of Bath and Wells, the Right Rev. Lord Arthur Hervey, on 28 August 1871. Yeovil Marsh was made its own ecclesiastical parish in March 1872.

== Architecture ==
All Saints is built of local stone sourced from the quarries at Brimsmore Tree, with dressings in Hamstone and Bridgwater tiles on the roof. Designed to accommodate 160 persons, it is made up of a nave, chancel, west porch and north-east vestry. There is a small bell turret with a single bell on the west end of the roof. The church has seven windows; the east end three-light window and the west window contain stained glass. The church's flooring is largely of deal and the aisles paved with tiles from Poole Potteries. The open panelled roof is of stained pine.

The original fittings include moveable benches of stained deal, a pulpit and reading desk of oak, and a font of Bath stone. The altar rail of carved oak was transferred from one of the churches in Yeovil. The church's original harmonium, made by Messrs. Price and Son, was also supplied at the expense of Mr. Bullock.
