= Church of St Peter, Draycott =

Church of St Peter
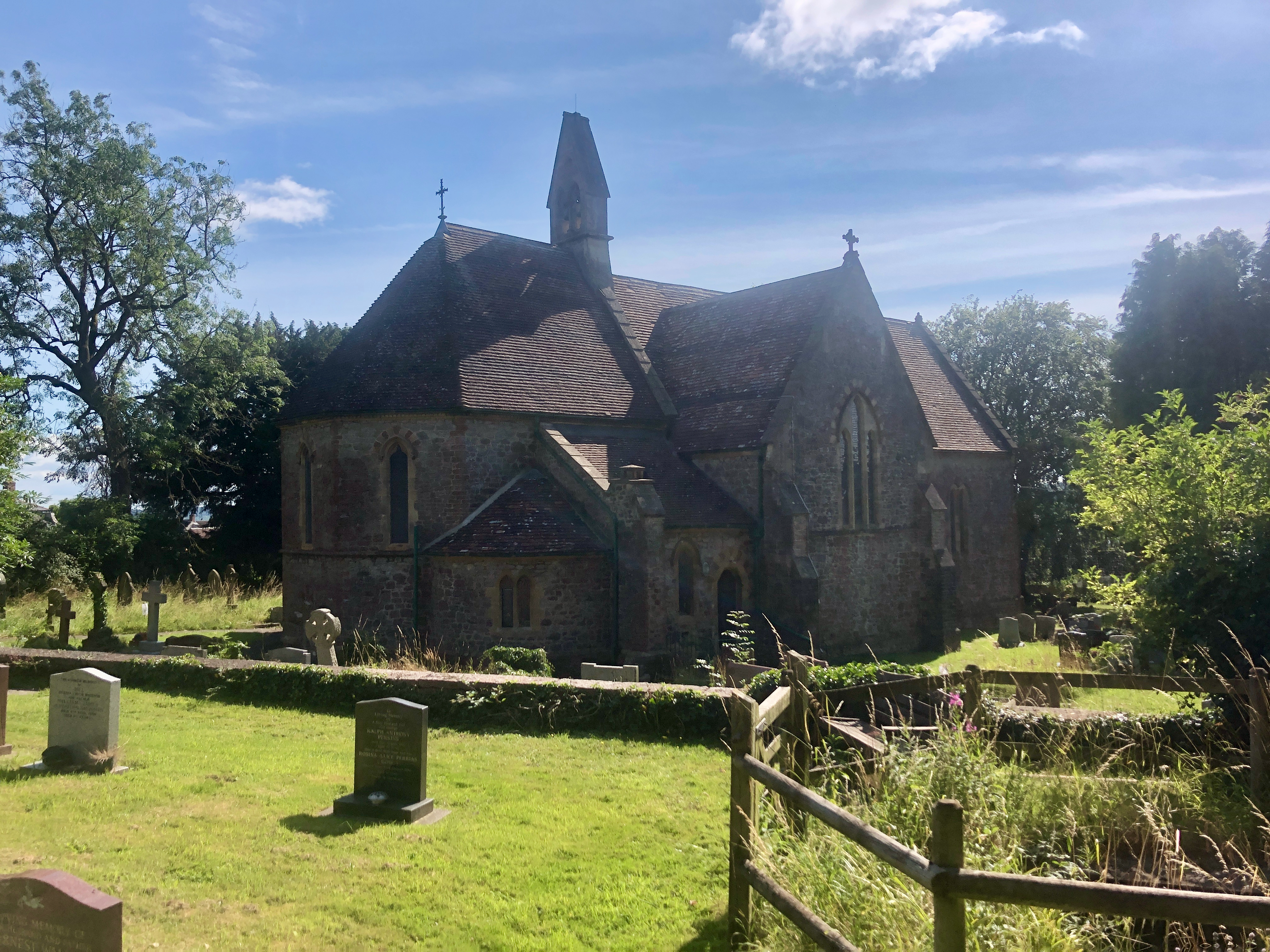

- Location within Somerset
- 51.2582°N 2.7521°W
- OS grid reference: ST 47616 51272
- Location: Draycott, Somerset
- Country: England
- Denomination: Anglican

History
- Status: Parish church

Architecture
- Functional status: Active
- Heritage designation: Grade II listed
- Designated: 29 January 1987
- Architect: Charles Edmund Giles
- Architectural type: Gothic Revival
- Years built: 1861

St Peter's Church is an Anglican parish church in Draycott, Somerset, England. It dates from 1861. Designed by Charles Edmund Giles, the church is a Grade II listed building. It holds a notable font by the celebrated Victorian art-architect William Burges, which the church controversially attempted to sell in 2006.

== History and description ==
The church was designed by Charles Edmund Giles and consecrated in 1861. (Note: Charles Giles is not a well-known architect. His brief entry in the Directory of British Architects 1834–1914 gives only his operating dates, 1849–68, and records no examples of his buildings. The Sussex Churches database records his dates of birth and death as 1822–1881.) The building stone is rubble, known locally as 'Draycott Marble', a dolomitic conglomerate quarried nearby. The church is in a simple Early English revival style. Historic England's listing record describes it as "competent", while Pevsner considers it "modest". The interior contains a rood screen fashioned in wrought iron. It is later in date than the church and Historic England suggests that the designer may have been George Fellowes Prynne.

The church is an active parish church in the benefice of Cheddar, Draycott and Rodney Stoke.

=== Burges font ===
The church's most notable feature is its font by William Burges. In his study, Anti-Ugly, the architectural historian Gavin Stamp described it as "the one object that makes [St. Peter's] interesting". It is uncertain how the font came to St Peter's. Recent research confirms that it was made for the Rev. John Augustus Yatman, a patron for whom Burges undertook a number of West Country–based commissions. (Note: The Yatman family comprised Ellen Yatman, widow of William Yatman, a barrister, and their three sons, the Rev. John Augustus, William Hamilton and Herbert George. Burges's work for the family included the Yatman Cabinet, for Herbert George, now held by the Victoria and Albert Museum. He also designed a memorial for Ellen, following her death in 1858, which stands in the grounds of the Rev. Yatman's home, Winscombe Hall.) The font's size suggests that it was not originally designed for St Peter's. It is possible that the original intended site was the Church of St James, Winscombe, where Burges reconstructed the chancel in 1863–64. It is attributed to Burges on stylistic grounds, and on the basis of a sketch in his notebooks. The style is Romanesque. It was likely sculpted by Thomas Nicholls. The faces of the font depict the Four Ages of Man, a design Burges subsequently reused at St Mary's, Studley Royal, in Yorkshire, and at his own London home, The Tower House.

Controversially, in 2006, the church attempted to sell the font for £110,000. The church had been approached by a private collector who offered to buy it and to fund a replacement. The vicar, the Rev. Stanley Price, contended that the sale was essential to meet a repair and restoration bill of an estimated £170,000. The sale was initially approved by the Chancellor of the Diocese of Bath and Wells, Timothy J Briden, but permission was subsequently refused in April 2009, when the Victorian Society appealed to the Court of Arches, one of the Church of England's highest courts. The court found "no compelling need to dispose of the font had been demonstrated" and concluded that, if allowed, "much of which adorns and adds interest, both historically and architecturally, to our churches would be lost to future generations."

== Gallery ==
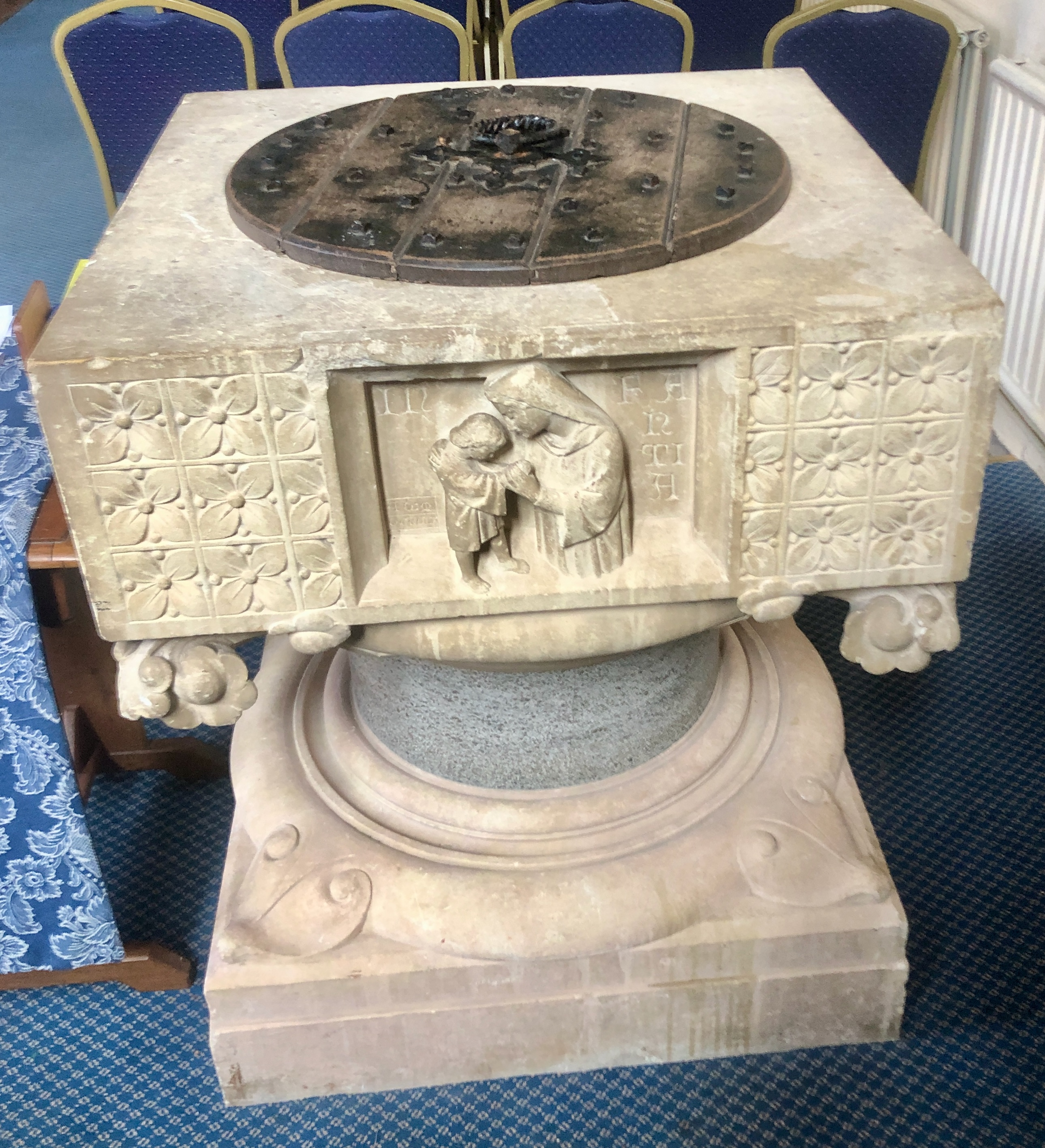
The Burges font

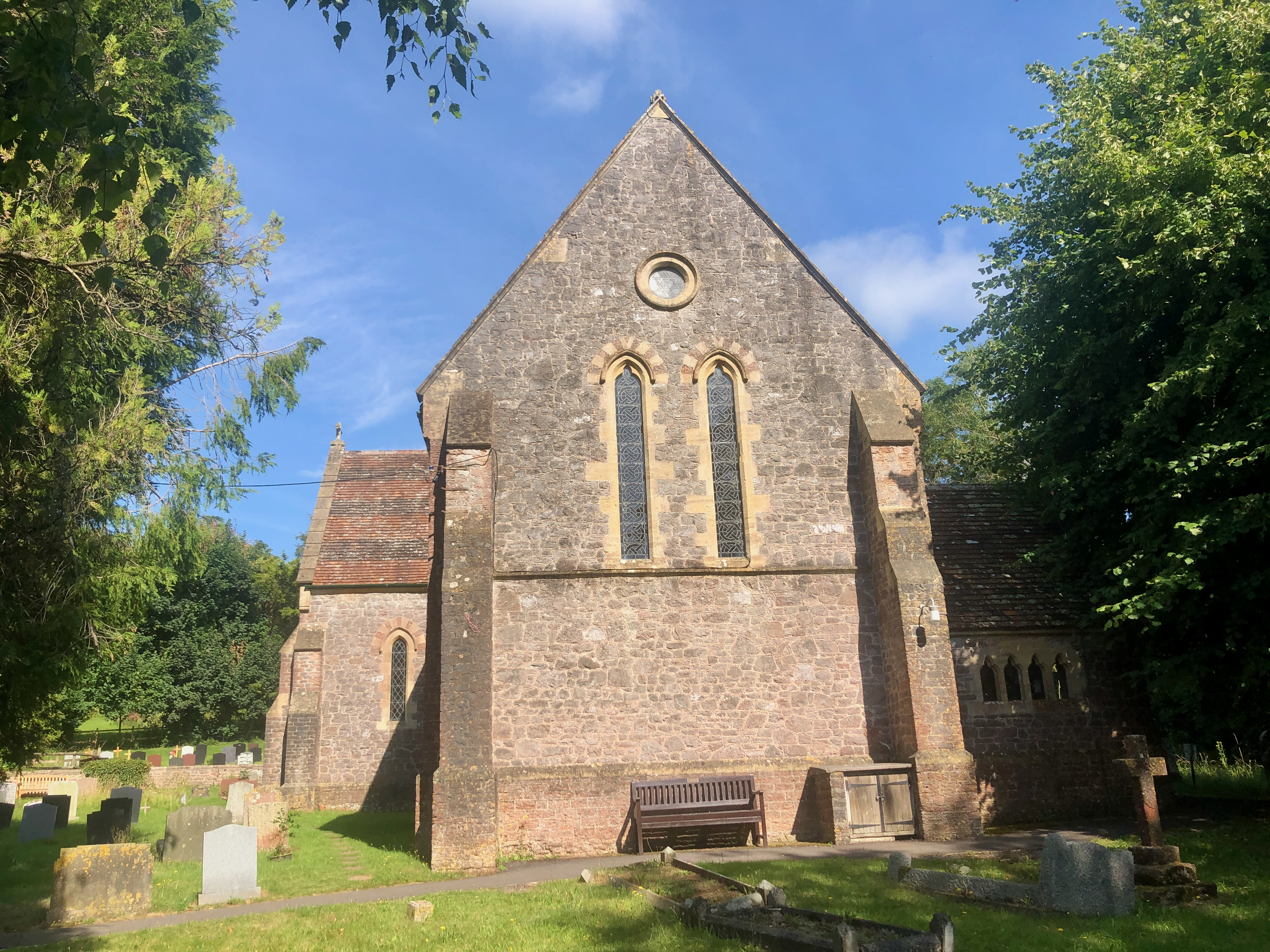
The east end

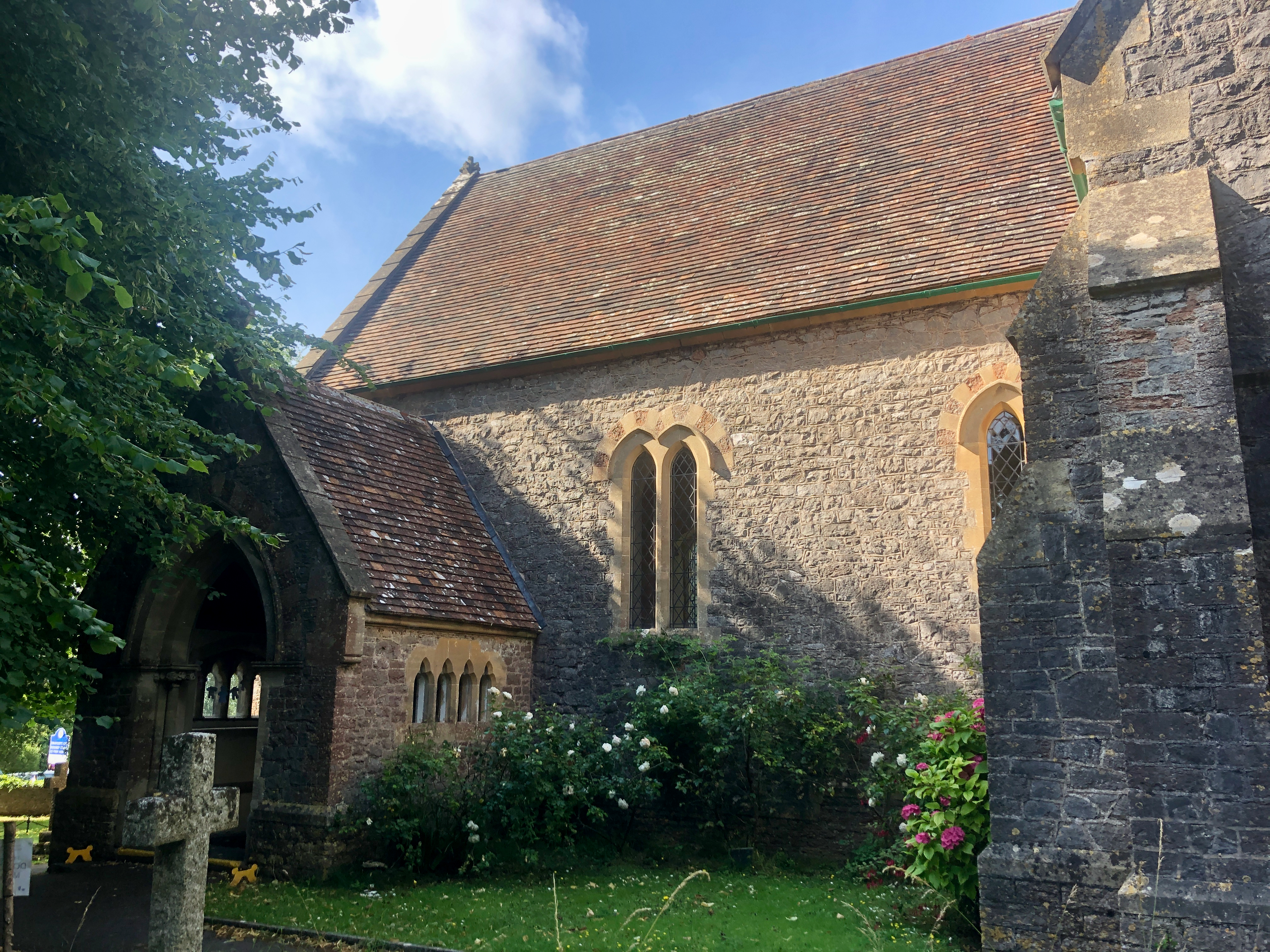
The porch

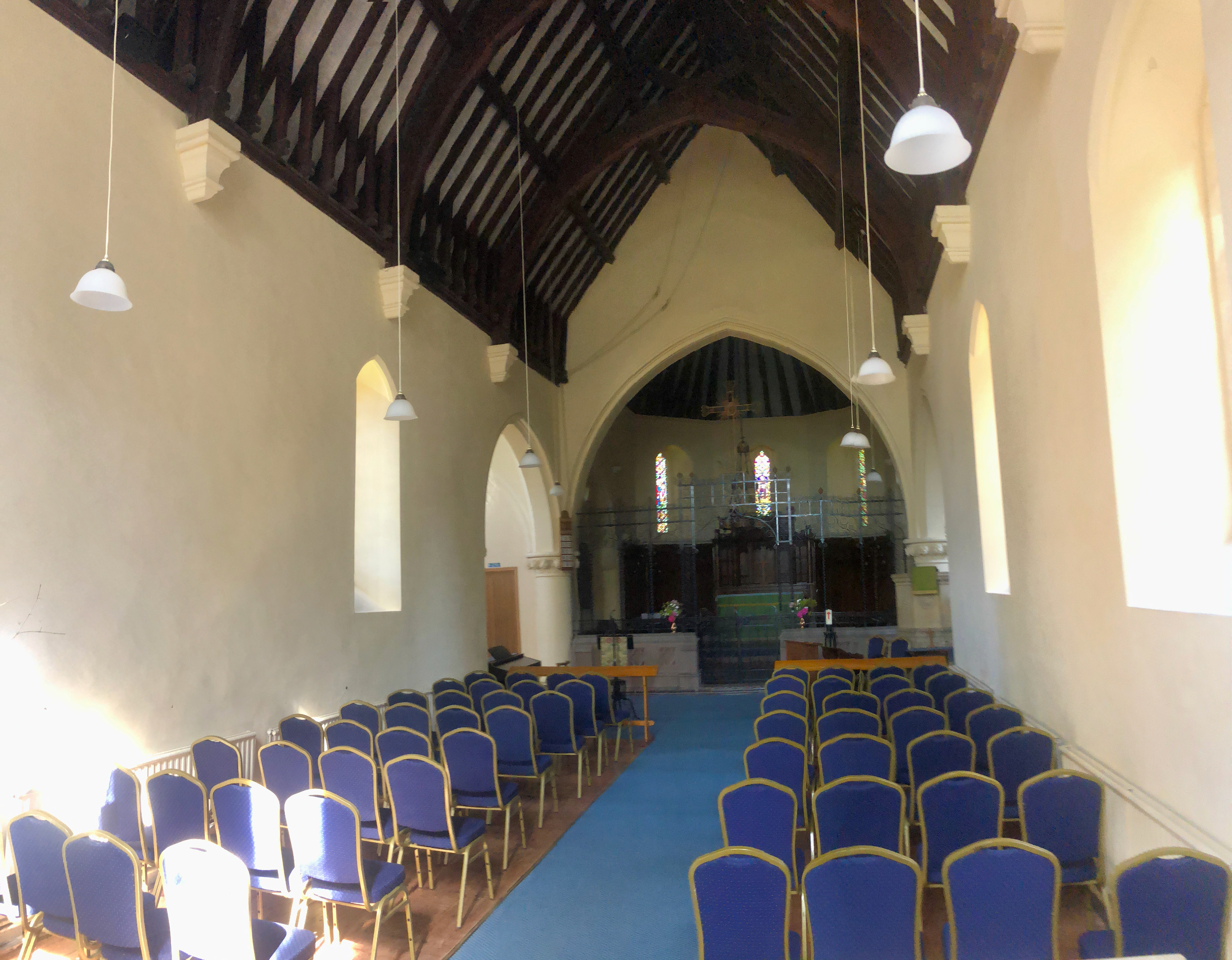
The interior

== Sources ==
- Atthill, Robin (1976). Mendip: A new study. Newton Abbot, Devon: David & Charles. ISBN 978-0-715-37297-5. OCLC 3169605.
- Brodie, Antonia; Felstead, Alison; Franklin, Jonathan; Pinfield, Leslie; Oldfield, Jane (2001). Directory of British Architects, 1834–1914. Vol. 1: (A-K). British Architectural Library. ISBN 0-8264-5513-1. OCLC 313986780.
- Crook, J. Mordaunt (2013). William Burges and the High Victorian Dream. London: Frances Lincoln. ISBN 978-0-711-23349-2.
- Foyle, Andrew; Pevsner, Nikolaus (2011). Somerset: North and Bristol. The Buildings of England. New Haven, US and London: Yale University Press. ISBN 978-0-300-12658-7. OCLC 751716531.
- Stamp, Gavin (2013). Anti-Ugly: Excursions in English Architecture and Design. London: Aurum Press. ISBN 978-1-781-31217-9.
- Victoria and Albert Museum (1996). Western furniture: 1350 to the present day in the Victoria and Albert Museum. Philip Wilson in association with the V&A. ISBN 978-0-856-67463-1.
