= Whitestaunton =

Village and civil parish in Somerset, England

Coordinates: 50.889°N 3.023°W

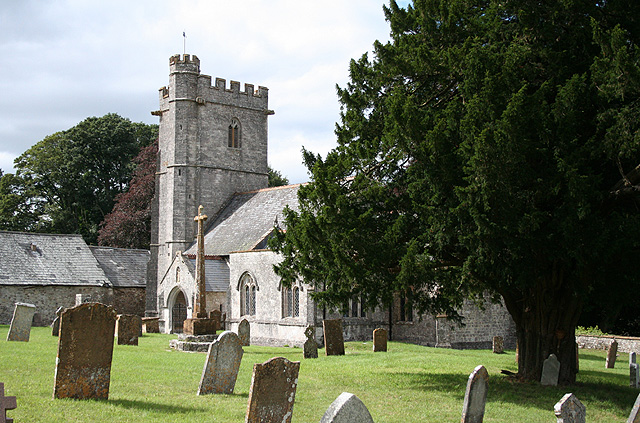
- St Andrew's church

- Location within Somerset
- Population: 256 (2011)
- OS grid reference: ST285105
- Civil parish: Whitestaunton
- Unitary authority: Somerset Council
- Ceremonial county: Somerset
- Region: South West
- Country: England
- Sovereign state: United Kingdom
- Post town: CHARD
- Postcode district: TA20
- Dialling code: 01460
- Police: Avon and Somerset
- Fire: Devon and Somerset
- Ambulance: South Western
- UK Parliament: Yeovil

Whitestaunton is a village and civil parish in the county of Somerset, England. The parish includes the hamlet of Northay. It was known simply as Staunton until the 14th century.

== History ==
The univallate Iron Age hill fort at Horse Pool Camp is situated approximately 1 mile (1.6 km) west from the village. The hill fort is an oval univallate that is 300 metres (980 ft) long and 150 metres (490 ft) wide.

The parish of Whitestaunton was part of the South Petherton Hundred.

A Roman bath house and Edwardian folly in the village were excavated by the television series Time Team.

Whitestaunton Manor dates from the 15th century and is a Grade I listed building.

== Governance ==
The parish council has responsibility for local issues, including setting an annual precept (local rate) to cover the council's operating costs and producing annual accounts for public scrutiny. The parish council evaluates local planning applications and works with the local police, district council officers, and neighbourhood watch groups on matters of crime, security, and traffic. The parish council's role also includes initiating projects for the maintenance and repair of parish facilities, as well as consulting with the district council on the maintenance, repair, and improvement of highways, drainage, footpaths, public transport, and street cleaning. Conservation matters (including trees and listed buildings) and environmental issues are also the responsibility of the council.

For local government purposes, since 1 April 2023, the parish comes under the unitary authority of Somerset Council. Prior to this, it was part of the non-metropolitan district of South Somerset (established under the Local Government Act 1972). It was part of Chard Rural District before 1974.

It is also part of the Yeovil county constituency represented in the House of Commons of the Parliament of the United Kingdom. It elects one Member of Parliament (MP) by the first past the post system of election.

== Religious sites ==
The Church of St Andrew dates from the 13th century and has been designated by English Heritage as a Grade I listed building.

== Notable residents ==
- Charles Isaac Elton (1839–1900) lawyer, antiquary, and politician.
