= St Andrew's Church, Backwell =

Church in Somerset, England

Coordinates: 51.4114°N 2.7306°W

Church of St Andrew, Backwell
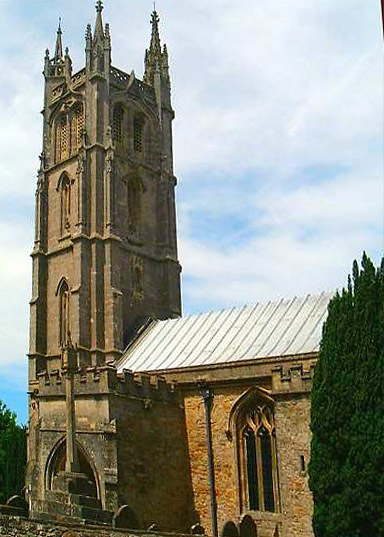
- Church of St Andrew, Backwell
- Church of St Andrew, Backwell
- Denomination: Church of England
- Website: www.backwellchelveybenefice.org.uk

Administration
- Province: Canterbury
- Diocese: Bath and Wells
- Archdeaconry: Bath
- Deanery: Portishead

Clergy
- Rector: Rev. Sam Norton

St Andrew's Church is an Anglican church in Backwell, Somerset, England. The church building dates back to the 13thcentury, when the nave, aisles and the chancel were built. The church was subsequently altered and enlarged during the 14th to 17th centuries; the 31m-high west tower dates from the 15th century, and the rood screen is from the early 16th century. The church has been a Grade I listed building since 1961.

The Parish of St Andrew is part of the benefice of Backwell with Chelvey and Brockley within the deanery of Portishead.

A new building attached to the church containing social and office space was added in 1984. There are plans to install solar panels on the roof of the church.

Since March 2025, the vicar has been Reverend Sam Norton.

== Churchyard ==
The churchyard includes a 15th-century cross. There is also a crucifix which is a memorial to a local airman Pat Garnett. It was made by Arthur George Walker and was sited below Backwell Hill House before becoming rusted and overgrown. It was restored and moved to the churchyard by Laurence Tindall in 1997. The churchyard also contains war graves of a York and Lancaster Regiment officer and an airman of World War II.

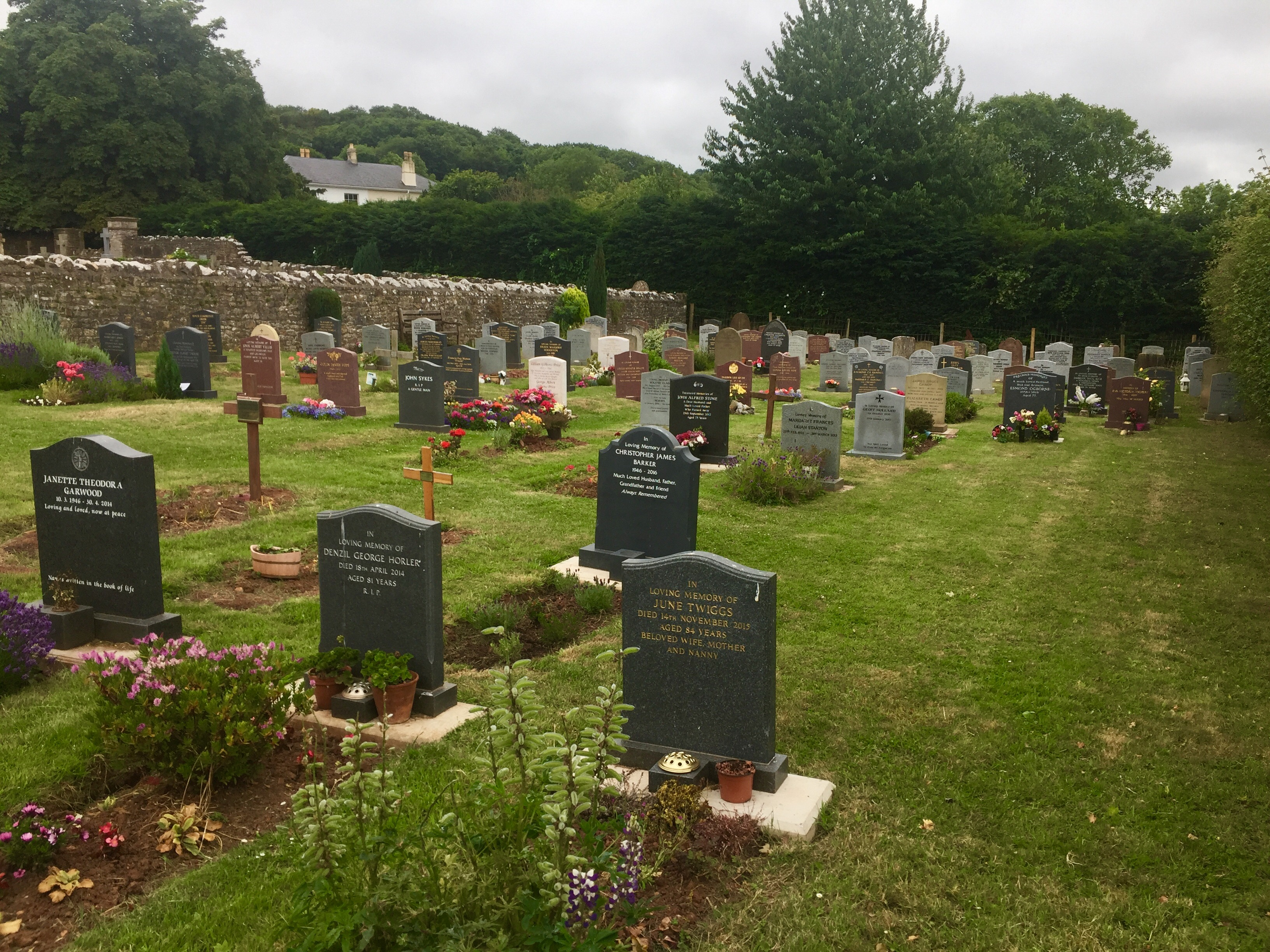
The churchyard of St Andrew's Church.

The Churchyard has very limited land space remaining for future burials; the church has restricted future burials to Backwell residents only, and is requesting permission to reuse existing graves that have no memorials and are more than 80 years old.

== See also ==
- List of Somerset towers
- List of ecclesiastical parishes in the Diocese of Bath and Wells

== Sources ==
- Pevsner, Nikolaus (1990). North Somerset and Bristol (5th ed.). Penguin Books. ISBN 0-14-0710132.
