= Bridgwater Without =

Civil parish in Somerset, England

Coordinates: 51.140°N 2.965°W

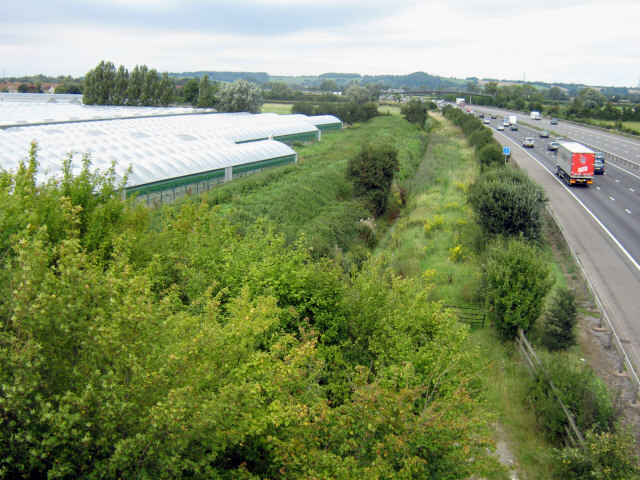
- Market gardens by the M5

- Location within Somerset
- Population: 2,819 (Parish, 2021)
- Civil parish: Bridgwater Without
- Unitary authority: Somerset Council
- Ceremonial county: Somerset
- Region: South West
- Country: England
- Sovereign state: United Kingdom
- Post town: BRIDGWATER
- Postcode district: TA7
- Police: Avon and Somerset
- Fire: Devon and Somerset
- Ambulance: South Western
- UK Parliament: Bridgwater

Bridgwater Without is a civil parish in the county of Somerset, England. It was created in 1894 from the rural parts of the ancient parish of Bridgwater which lay outside the town's borough boundaries. Bridgwater Without covers a rural area to the east of Bridgwater, including the settlements of Dunwear, Horsey and Slape Cross, and also includes some peripheral parts of the built-up area of Bridgwater, including Willow Down. At the 2021 census, the parish had a population of 2,819.

== History ==
The area was historically part of the ancient parish of Bridgwater. Bridgwater was also an ancient borough, having been granted its first municipal charter in 1200. Until 1836, the borough boundaries matched the parish. In 1836, the borough was converted into a municipal borough under the Municipal Corporations Act 1835. As part of these reforms, the borough boundaries were reduced to match the Bridgwater constituency, which had been redefined in 1832 to cover a smaller area focused on the built-up area of the town as it then was.

Elected parish and district councils were established under the Local Government Act 1894, which also directed that civil parishes could no longer straddle borough boundaries. The parish of Bridgwater was therefore reduced to match the borough, and the parts of the old parish outside the borough became a new civil parish called Bridgwater Without. When first created, Bridgwater Without covered areas wrapping round Bridgwater borough on three sides, from north-east to south-east to south-west. Bridgwater Without ceded territory to the borough of Bridgwater in 1896, 1929, 1933 and 1938. In 1933, it also ceded territory to a number of neighbouring parishes, after which the reduced Bridgwater Without parish lay entirely to the east of Bridgwater.

== Governance ==
There are two tiers of local government covering Bridgwater Without, at parish and unitary authority level: Bridgwater Without Parish Council and Somerset Council. The parish council meets at the Morganians Rugby Club on Chedzoy Lane.

For national elections, the parish forms part of the Bridgwater constituency.

From its creation in 1894 until 1974, the parish formed part of the Bridgwater Rural District. In 1974, Bridgwater Rural District was abolished, and the parish became part of the new district of Sedgemoor. Sedgemoor was in turn abolished in 2023. Somerset County Council then took over district-level functions across its area, making it a unitary authority, and was renamed Somerset Council.
