= Yeovil Without =

Civil parish in Somerset, England

Coordinates: 50.955°N 2.649°W

Yeovil Without is a civil parish in the county of Somerset, England. It was created in 1894 from the parts of the ancient parish of Yeovil which lay outside the borough boundaries of Yeovil.

It lies on the northern edge of Yeovil. It includes both suburbs of Yeovil, including the Bucklers Mead development, and rural areas including the hamlets of Yeovil Marsh and Longcroft. The parish includes Johnson Park and Bucklers Mead Community School. In 2011 the parish had a population of 6,834. The Parish Council is composed of five councillors from each of the wards of Brimsmore, Combe and Lyde. The parish council was formed by the Local Government Act 1894.

== Governance ==
The parish council has responsibility for local issues, including setting an annual precept (local rate) to cover the council's operating costs and producing annual accounts for public scrutiny. The parish council evaluates local planning applications and works with the local police, district council officers, and neighbourhood watch groups on matters of crime, security, and traffic. The parish council's role also includes initiating projects for the maintenance and repair of parish facilities, as well as consulting with the district council on the maintenance, repair, and improvement of highways, drainage, footpaths, public transport, and street cleaning. Conservation matters (including trees and listed buildings) and environmental issues are also the responsibility of the council.

For local government purposes, since 1 April 2023, the parish comes under the unitary authority of Somerset Council. Prior to this, it was part of the non-metropolitan district of South Somerset (established under the Local Government Act 1972). It was part of Yeovil Rural District before 1974.

It is also part of the Yeovil county constituency represented in the House of Commons of the Parliament of the United Kingdom. It elects one member of parliament (MP) by the first past the post system of election.
