= List of scheduled monuments in Taunton Deane =

Taunton Deane shown within Somerset and England

Taunton Deane was a local government district with borough status in Somerset, England. It merged with West Somerset to form Somerset West and Taunton on 1 April 2019. Its council was based in Taunton. The district was formed on 1 April 1974, under the Local Government Act 1972, by a merger of the Municipal Borough of Taunton, Wellington Urban District, Taunton Rural District, and Wellington Rural District. Taunton Deane was granted borough status in 1975, enabling the mayoralty of Taunton to be continued, when other districts did not have mayors. The district was given the name of an alternate form of the Taunton Deane Hundred.

A scheduled monument is a nationally important archaeological site or monument which is given legal protection by being placed on a list (or "schedule") by the Secretary of State for Digital, Culture, Media and Sport; English Heritage takes the leading role in identifying such sites. The legislation governing this is the Ancient Monuments and Archaeological Areas Act 1979. The term "monument" can apply to the whole range of archaeological sites, and they are not always visible above ground. Such sites have to have been deliberately constructed by human activity. They range from prehistoric standing stones and burial sites, through Roman remains and Medieval structures such as castles and monasteries, to later structures such as industrial sites and buildings constructed for the World Wars or the Cold War.

There are 33 scheduled monuments in Taunton Deane. Many of them are Neolithic through to the Bronze and Iron Ages such as bowl barrows, cairns along with hill forts such as Norton Camp. Castle Neroche was an Iron Age hill fort which was reused as a Norman motte-and-bailey castle. Burrow Mump shows evidence of Roman use but is better known as a Norman motte-and-bailey castle, and later church. It was presented, in 1946, by Major Alexander Gould Barrett, to the National Trust to serve as a memorial to the 11,281 Somerset men who lost their lives during the first and second world wars.

The Medieval period is represented by several churchyard crosses. The defensive walls and part of Taunton Castle, which has Anglo-Saxon origins and was expanded during the Medieval and Tudor eras, is included. More recent sites include Poundisford Park, Buckland Priory, Bradford Bridge and a duck decoy from the 17th century. Some of the sites such as Balt Moor Wall are of uncertain date; however the most recent are air traffic control buildings, pillboxes and fighter pens from RAF Culmhead, situated at Churchstanton on the Blackdown Hills. The monuments are listed below using the titles given in the English Heritage data sheets.

== Monuments ==
Name	Location	Type	Completed (Note: The date given is the date used by Historic England as significant for the initial building or that of an important part in the structure's description.)	Grid ref. (Note: The grid reference is based on the British national grid reference system, sometimes known as OSGB36, used by the Ordnance Survey.) Geo-coordinates	Notes	Entry number (Note: The "List Entry Number" is a unique number assigned to each listed building and scheduled monument by Historic England.)	Image	Ref.
Balt Moor Wall	Lyng	Earthwork	Before 1135 (possibly 9th century)	ST 33826 29095; 51°03′27″N 2°56′44″W	The remains of a 550 metres (1,800 ft) section of medieval causeway, which now forms a raised embankment between 6 metres (20 ft) and 10 metres (33 ft) wide and up to 2 metres (6 ft 7 in) high.	1018952	Upload Photo	
Borough Bank	Taunton	Earthwork	Middle Ages	ST 22881 24692; 51°00′59″N 3°06′03″W	The remains of medieval town walls. It now forms a bank and ditch around 2 metres (6 ft 7 in) high and 3.5 metres (11 ft) wide.	1019401	Upload Photo	
Bowl barrow at the west end of Cothelstone Hill, 825m NNE of St Agnes' Well	Cothelstone	Bowl barrow	Bronze Age or Iron Age	ST 18763 32603; 51°05′13″N 3°09′41″W	A bowl barrow with a diameter of 19 metres (62 ft) and 1.7 metres (5 ft 7 in) high.	1015085	Upload Photo	
Bowl barrow 840m north east of Bagborough House	West Bagborough	Bowl barrow	Bronze Age	ST 17182 34495; 51°06′14″N 3°11′03″W	An irregular oval bowl barrow which is 24 metres (79 ft) long, 14 metres (46 ft) wide and approximately 1 metre (3 ft 3 in) high, surrounded by a 3 metres (9.8 ft) wide ditch which has since been filled in.	1016500	Upload Photo	
Bowl barrow and folly ruins on Cothelstone Hill, 1km north east of St Agnes' Well	Cothelstone	Bowl barrow	Bronze Age and post Medieval	ST 18979 32677; 51°05′16″N 3°09′30″W	A Bowl barrow which is 12 metres (39 ft) in diameter and 1.5 metres (4 ft 11 in) high on which a folly was built in the 18th century. The folly tower was destroyed in 1910.	1015086	Upload Photo	
Bowl barrow on Cothelstone Hill, 1.07km north east of St Agnes' Well	Cothelstone	Bowl barrow	Bronze Age or Iron Age	ST 19121 32656; 51°05′15″N 3°09′22″W	An irregular bowl barrow, 2.67 metres (8 ft 9 in) long and 14 metres (46 ft) wide surrounded by a ditch.	1015087	Upload Photo	
Bowl barrow on Cothelstone Hill, 885m NNE of St Agnes' Well	Cothelstone	Bowl barrow	Bronze Age or Iron Age	ST 18830 32633; 51°05′14″N 3°09′37″W	A bowl barrow, 19 metres (62 ft) in diameter and 1.7 metres (5 ft 7 in) in height.	1015950	Upload Photo	
Bradford Bridge	Bradford on Tone	Bridge	14th century	ST 17192 22998; 51°00′01″N 3°10′53″W	A 15th century stone bridge with two arches, carrying a road over the River Tone.	1006220	Bradford Bridge	
Buckland Priory fishponds	Durston	Fish pond	12th century	ST 30147 28242; 51°03′12″N 3°00′33″W	An area approximately 150 metres (490 ft) by 61 metres (200 ft) opposite the priory which contains the remains of three fishponds. The ponds were probably dug in the 13th century and were filled in by 1725.	1006145	Buckland Priory fishponds	
Burrow Mump: a motte castle, later chapel and associated earthworks	Burrowbridge	Motte-and-bailey castle	Norman	ST 35930 30540; 51°04′06″N 2°55′14″W	Sited on a hill where the River Tone and the old course of the River Cary join the River Parrett, above the surrounding low lying land of the Somerset Levels. Archeological surveys have shown some Roman material and three medieval pits. It is likely that it was a Norman motte which may have been built during The Anarchy between 1135 and 1153. A medieval church dedicated to St Michael, belonging to the Athelney Abbey, dates from at least the mid 15th century. In 1793, the church was rebuilt. The hill and ruined roofless nave with the remains of the porch, some window openings without tracery were presented, in 1946, to the National Trust and serve as a memorial to the 11,281 Somerset men who lost their lives during the first and second world wars.	1011823	Burrow Mump: a motte castle, later chapel and associated earthworks More images	
Cairn 280m south of Triscombe Stone	West Bagborough	Cairn	Bronze Age	ST 16425 35617; 51°06′49″N 3°11′43″W	A Bronze Age cairn close to Wills Neck the highest point of the Quantock Hills. It is 23 metres (75 ft) in diameter and 0.5 metres (1 ft 8 in) high.	1016707	Upload Photo	
Camp S of Manor Farm	Wiveliscombe	Roman fort	1st century	ST 09014 27044; 51°02′08″N 3°17′56″W	Crop marks show evidence of a rectangular enclosure 1.5 metres (4 ft 11 in) above the surrounding fields. Excavations in the 1950s indicated it was likely to be the remains of a Roman fort.	1006167	Upload Photo	
Castle Neroche: a motte and bailey castle and earlier defences above Castle Plantation	Curland	Hill fort	Iron Age reused in Norman period	ST 27202 15708; 50°56′15″N 3°02′12″W	A Norman motte-and-bailey castle on the site of an earlier Iron Age hill fort. The castle was probably built by Robert, Count of Mortain in the 11th century.	1008252	Castle Neroche: a motte and bailey castle and earlier defences above Castle Plantation	
Cross in St John the Baptist's churchyard, Heathfield	Heathfield, Oake	Cross	Middle Ages	ST 16005 26457; 51°01′53″N 3°11′57″W	A medieval cross on an octagonal base. The shaft is approximately 2 metres (6 ft 7 in) high but the head is missing.	1016942	Cross in St John the Baptist's churchyard, Heathfield	
Cross in St James' churchyard	Fitzhead	Cross	14th century	ST118284; 51°02′52″N 3°15′26″W	A medieval cross on an octagonal base. The shaft is approximately 1.5 metres (4 ft 11 in) high. The decorated lantern head was added as part of restoration in 1908.	1017291	Upload Photo	
Duck decoy 250m north west of Moredon House	North Curry	Duck decoy	17th century	ST320264; 51°01′57″N 2°58′07″W	Duck decoy from the 17th century. The oval pool is now 50 metres (160 ft) by 40 metres (130 ft).	1014441	Upload Photo	
Hillfort on Castle Hill 650m south east of Ford House	Wiveliscombe	Hill fort	Neolithic	ST095282; 51°02′46″N 3°17′23″W	King's Castle is a Neolithic hillfort surrounded by two banks with a ditch between them. The inner wall ranges up to 2.5 metres (8.2 ft) high and the outer wall gets up to 1.5 metres (4.9 ft) high. Arrowheads, scrapers, and borers have been found at the site.	1016498	Hillfort on Castle Hill 650m south east of Ford House	
Norton Camp large univallate hillfort	Norton Fitzwarren	Hill fort	Bronze Age	ST 19613 26267; 51°01′50″N 3°09′04″W	The earthwork consists of a single circular rampart (univallate) up to 3 m high, with three holloway entrances dominated by linear banks extending out from the main perimeter. The ring has a diameter of about 250 metres (820 ft), enclosing an area of 5 hectares (12 acres). The fort is at the top of low hill about 1 kilometre (0.62 mi) north of the River Tone. It is on the Heritage at Risk Register.	1008467	Norton Camp large univallate hillfort More images	
Poundisford Park pale	Pitminster	Deer park	Middle Ages	ST 21147 19897; 50°58′34″N 3°06′29″W	The park surrounding Poundisford Park covers around 180 hectares (444.8 acres) including 2 hectares (4.9 acres) of gardens and pleasure grounds, and 178 hectares (440 acres) which were enclosed within the medieval park pale, which formed an elliptical shape, of which 40 hectares (99 acres) remains as parkland today. The park pale was a barrier to contain deer made of an earthen bank from 4 metres (13.1 ft) to 7 metres (23.0 ft) wide and up to 2 metres (6.6 ft) high. It is on the Heritage at Risk Register.	1002957	Poundisford Park pale	
Round barrow cemetery 100m south of School Farm	Otterford	Round barrow	Bronze Age	ST 22998 14368; 50°55′25″N 3°05′49″W	Five round barrows in a line which form part of the larger Bronze Age cemetery on the Blackdown Hills known as Robin Hood's Butts.	1017055	Upload Photo	
Shell keep castle, part of the associated outer bailey, ninth century cemetery and a Civil War siegework at Taunton Castle	Taunton	Shell keep	13th century	ST 22611 24581; 51°00′55″N 3°06′50″W	Taunton Castle has origins in the Anglo Saxon period and was later the site of a priory. The Normans then built a stone structured castle, which belonged to the Bishops of Winchester. The current heavily reconstructed buildings are the inner ward, which now houses the Museum of Somerset and the Somerset Military Museum.	1013541	Shell keep castle, part of the associated outer bailey, ninth century cemetery and a Civil War siegework at Taunton Castle More images	
The Castles	Bathealton	Univallate hill fort	Iron Age	ST 05742 24484; 51°00′43″N 3°20′42″W	Castles Camp is a univallate Iron Age hill fort. It covers an area of 1.6 hectares (4.0 acres) surrounded by a bank and ditch.	1019150	Upload Photo	
Three round cairns on Wills Neck	Wills Neck	Cairn	Bronze Age	ST1649035170; 51°06′35″N 3°11′39″W	Three Bronze Age cairns close to Wills Neck the highest point of the Quantock Hills. They range from 20 metres (66 ft) to 30 metres (98 ft) in diameter. There is a Triangulation station on the easternmost cairn.	1016502	Upload Photo	
Two bowl barrows 210m and 600m north west of Brown Down Cottage	Otterford	Bowl barrow	Late Neolithic to Bronze Age	ST233126; 50°54′27″N 3°05′26″W	Two bowl barrows which form part of the larger Bronze Age cemetery on the Blackdown Hills known as Robin Hood's Butts.	1016414	Upload Photo	
Two bowl barrows, one 380m west and one 685m north west of Beech Croft	Otterford	Bowl barrow	Late Neolithic to Late Bronze Age	ST234132; 50°54′46″N 3°05′19″W	Two bowl barrows in a line which form part of the larger Bronze Age cemetery on the Blackdown Hills known as Robin Hood's Butts.	1016415	Two bowl barrows, one 380m west and one 685m north west of Beech Croft	
Two bowl barrows 190m east of Brown Down Lodge	Otterford	Bowl barrow	Late Neolithic to Late Bronze Age	ST241124; 50°54′21″N 3°04′46″W	Two bowl barrows one of 10 metres (33 ft) diameter and the other of 12 metres (39 ft). Each is approximately 1 metre (3 ft 3 in) high.	1016739	Upload Photo	
Two bowl barrows and a round cairn on Lydeard Hill, 750m north of Tilbury Farm	West Bagborough	Bowl barrow	Bronze Age	ST176343; 51°06′06″N 3°10′34″W	Two bowl barrows and a cairn, which has a higher proportion of stone than soil, all dating from the Bronze Age. Each is around 20 metres (66 ft) in diameter and 1 metre (3 ft 3 in) high.	1016499	Upload Photo	
Two bowl barrows, 530m and 670m north east of Plantation Cottage	West Bagborough	Bowl barrow	Bronze Age	ST 16873 34860; 51°06′25″N 3°11′19″W	Two Bowl barrows on Wills Neck the highest point of the Quantock Hills.	1016501	Upload Photo	
Two cairns, 780m ESE of Triscombe Farm	West Bagborough	Cairn	Bronze Age	ST 16197 35237; 51°06′37″N 3°11′55″W	Two cairns on Wills Neck the highest point of the Quantock Hills.	1016706	Upload Photo	
Two crosses in St Mary's churchyard	Bishops Lydeard	Cross	14th century	ST 16761 29732; 51°03′41″N 3°11′14″W	Two crosses, one of hamstone and the other red sandstone. The cross nearest the church has a 19th century base holding the cross shaft which is from the 14th century. The second cross has a carving of John the Baptist on the east face.	1016708	Two crosses in St Mary's churchyard	
Two groups of World War II pillboxes in the north eastern and north western sectors of the former airfield of RAF Culmhead, Trickey Warren	Churchstanton	Pillbox	1941	ST 20751 15610; 50°56′12″N 3°08′05″W	Two pillboxes dating from World War II which protected the airfield.	1019846	Two groups of World War II pillboxes in the north eastern and north western sectors of the former airfield of RAF Culmhead, Trickey Warren	
Two World War II air traffic control buildings, 620m west and 560m WSW of Whitewall Corner, on the former airfield of RAF Culmhead, Trickey Warren	Churchstanton	Air traffic control tower	1941	ST 20751 15610; 50°56′04″N 3°07′45″W	The World War II control towers for the airfield. One which was known as the Old Watch Office is slightly older and a second built to replace it.	1019845	Two World War II air traffic control buildings, 620m west and 560m WSW of Whitewall Corner, on the former airfield of RAF Culmhead, Trickey Warren	
World War II fighter pens and other airfield remains and defences of the former airfield of RAF Culmhead, at Trickey Warren Farm	Churchstanton	Blast pen	1941	ST 20354 14425; 50°55′26″N 3°08′04″W	A group of blast pens built to protect fighter aircraft during World War II.	1020492	Upload Photo	

== See also ==
- Scheduled monuments in Somerset
- Grade I listed buildings in Taunton Deane
- Grade II* listed buildings in Taunton Deane
