= Spurway =

Spurway is may refer to:

- Spurway, Oakford, an historic manor in Devon, England
- The Spurway family, of Riverview House, West Ryde, New South Wales, Australia

== People with the surname ==
- Edward Spurway (1863–1914), English cricketer
- Francis Spurway (1894–1980), English cricketer
- Helen Spurway (c.1917–1978), British biologist
- Michael Spurway (1909–2007), British civil servant in the Colonial Service and later a businessman
- Robert Spurway (1866–1898), English cricketer
- Sam Spurway (born 1987), English cricketer
- Thomas Spurway, English Member of Parliament
