= Church of St Pancras, West Bagborough =

Church in Somerset, England

Church of St Pancras
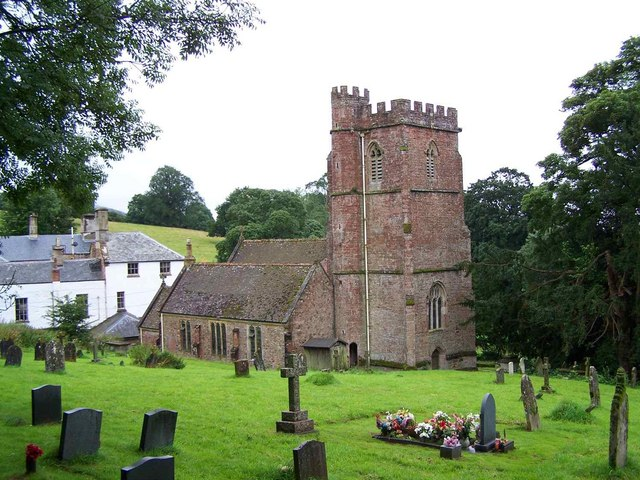

- Location within Somerset
- 51.0966°N 3.1888°W
- Location: West Bagborough, Somerset, England

History
- Built: 15th century

Listed Building – Grade II*
- Official name: Church of St Pancras
- Designated: 25 February 1955
- Reference no.: 1344480

The Anglican Church of St Pancras in West Bagborough, Somerset, England was built in the 15th century. It is a Grade II* listed building.

== History ==
The church was built in the 15th century with additions 1643 and a Victorian restoration in 1872. The north aisle was added in 1839. The organ and communion rails were brought from a church at Brompton Ralph in 1910. Further restoration was undertaken in 1923 by Ninian Comper.

The church is away from the main village, close to Bagborough House. The location of the church away from the village is believed to be a result of an outbreak of Black Death, when may of the villagers died. They then abandoned the area around the church and rebuilt houses further down the hill. The lychgate is dedicated to the memory of Robert Brooke-Popham.

The parish is part of the benefice of Bishop's Lydeard with Lydeard Saint Lawrence, Combe Florey and Cothelstone within the Diocese of Bath and Wells.

== Architecture ==
The red sandstone building has a tiled roof. It consists of a chancel, a nave and aisle each with three bays with wagon roofs. The south porch was added in 1643. The three-stage west tower is supported by diagonal buttresses. The tower has six bells.

Inside the church is a tablet with the names of the men from the village who died in World War I.

== See also ==
- List of ecclesiastical parishes in the Diocese of Bath and Wells
