= Church of St Thomas of Canterbury, Cothelstone =

Church in Somerset, England

Church of St Thomas of Canterbury
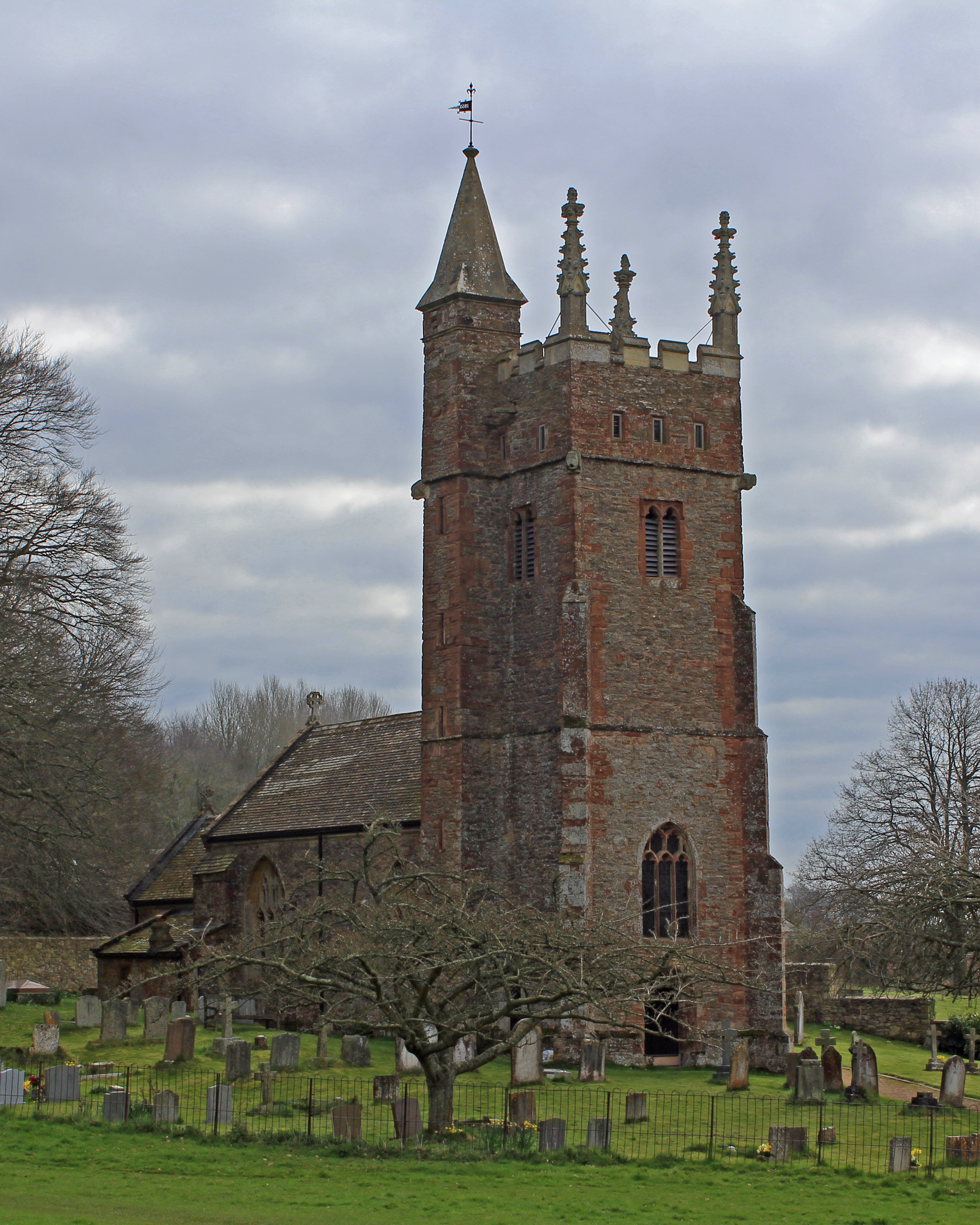
- The Church of St Thomas

- Location within Somerset

General information
- Location: Cothelstone, England
- Coordinates: 51.0801°N 3.1700°W
- Completed: 12th century

The romanesque red sandstone Church of St Thomas of Canterbury in Cothelstone, Somerset, England dates from the 12th century and has been designated as a Grade I listed building.

It was largely restored in 1864. It includes memorials to the Stawell family including: Sir Matthew de Stawell, died 1379, and his wife Elizabeth, and John Stawell, died 1603, and has been supported by the Esdailes family who have been more recent lords of the manor.

The church is closely associated with Cothelstone Manor which is also a listed building. Services are held each week using the 1662 Book of Common Prayer.

The parish is part of the benefice of Bishop's Lydeard with Lydeard Saint Lawrence, Bagborough, Combe Florey and Cothelstone within the archdeaconry of Taunton.

== Restoration ==
Since 2000 significant repair work has been carried out. In 2002 the tower and porch were repointed. In 2006 the roof tiles were removed, new felt put underneath, the original tiles put back and the guttering repaired to keep out the west country weather. In 2008 the church was rewired, the lighting added to and the under-pew heating replaced with a modern equivalent.

All the above was paid for with nearly £45,000 raised within the parish, two small grants from sympathetic charitable trusts, a small contribution from the Diocese of Bath and Wells and an overseas donation from the Esdailes. Further renovation work is planned to the vestry, which is at the bottom of the tower, and the provision of a lavatory.

== See also ==
- List of Grade I listed buildings in Taunton Deane
- List of towers in Somerset
- List of ecclesiastical parishes in the Diocese of Bath and Wells
