= West Bagborough Hoard =

Coordinates: 51.09°N 3.18°W

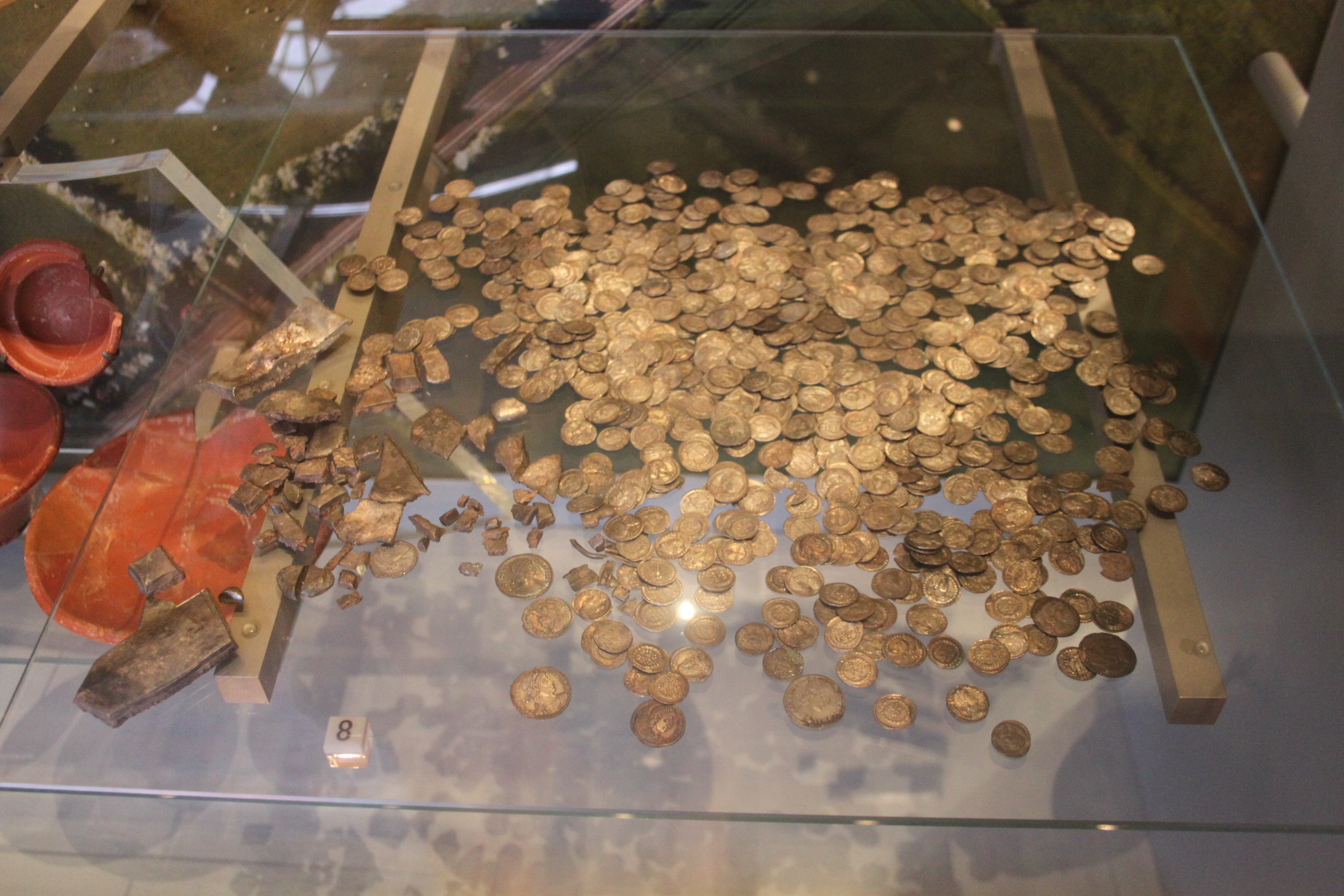
- Coins from the West Bagborough Hoard on display at the Museum of Somerset
- Material: Silver and hacksilver coins
- Size: 681 coins
- Period/culture: Romano-British
- Discovered: Near West Bagborough, Somerset, by James Hawkesworth in October 2001
- Present location: Somerset County Museum, Taunton
- Identification: 2001 (Fig 196)

The West Bagborough Hoard is a hoard of 670 Roman coins and 72 pieces of hacksilver found in October 2001 by metal detectorist James Hawkesworth near West Bagborough in Somerset, England.

== Discovery, excavation and valuation ==
The hoard was discovered by metal detectorist James Hawkesworth, a policeman from Bishops Lydeard. No trace of buildings or other structures were found in the area.

Following a treasure inquest at Taunton, the hoard was declared treasure and valued at £40,650. Somerset County Museum Services acquired the hoard, with the aid of Somerset County Council, the Heritage Lottery Fund, and £16,400 from the Victoria and Albert Museum/Resource Purchase Grant Fund. It is now displayed at the Museum of Somerset in the grounds of Taunton Castle.

== Items discovered ==
The 681 coins included two denarii from the early 2nd century and eight miliarense and 671 siliqua all dating from the period AD 337 – 367, but including a large number of copies some silver and others from a copper alloy covered with silver sheet. The latest coins indicate that the hoard was buried in circa AD 365. The majority were struck in the reigns of emperors Constantius II and Julian and derive from a range of mints including Arles and Lyon in France, Trier in Germany and Rome. There were also 64 pieces of hacksilver, weighing a total of 722gm.

Reign	Date	No. of coins
Trajan	98-117	one
Marcus Aurelius	139-161	one
	2nd century denarii	two
Constantius II	307-363	603
Valentinian period	364-392	12
Uncertain		52

== See also ==
- List of hoards in Britain
