= Lang's Farm =

- Site of Special Scientific Interest
- Location within Somerset
- Location of Lang's Farm.
- Area of search: Somerset
- Grid reference: ST170241
- Coordinates: 51.01027°N 3.18447°W
- Interest: Biological
- Area: 7.5 hectares (0.075 km^{2}; 0.029 sq mi)
- Notification date: 1990

Lang's Farm (grid reference ST170241) is a 7.5 hectare (18.5 acre) biological Site of Special Scientific Interest between Oake and Bradford on Tone in Somerset, notified in 1990.

This site is an example of unimproved, herb-rich neutral grassland of a type now rare in Britain.
