= Cothelstone Manor =

Manor house in Cothelstone, Somerset, England

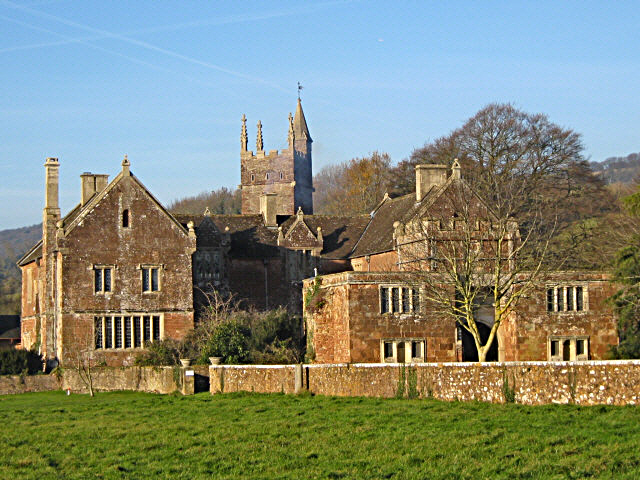
- Cothelstone Manor with the Church of St Thomas behind

- Location within Somerset

General information
- Location: Cothelstone, England
- Coordinates: 51.0798°N 3.1692°W
- Completed: 16th century
- Demolished: 1646 (rebuilt 1855–56)

Cothelstone Manor in Cothelstone, Somerset, England was built in the mid-16th century, largely demolished by the parliamentary troops in 1646 and rebuilt by E.J. Esdaile in 1855–56.

It is closely associated with the Church of St Thomas of Canterbury, which is a Grade I listed building, and contains memorials to many of the owners of Cothelstone Manor including: Sir Matthew de Stawell, died 1379, and his wife Elizabeth, and John Stawell, died 1603. The Stawell family lived at Cothelstone from 1066 until 1791.

== History ==
Cothelstone Manor was given to Sir Adam de Coveston by William the Conqueror, and there has been a house on the site since, during which time it has been in the hands of only two families.

During the Civil War, John Stawell the lord of the manor fought on the side of the royalists and in 1646 went to London with a copy of his terms of surrender from Sir Thomas Fairfax. He was imprisoned for high treason and Cromwell ordered the destruction of his Elizabethan house by cannon fire. Only the left-hand wing and ground floor of the central block remaining and abandoned. In 1651 the lands were advertised for sale. After Charles II was crowned King of England and Ireland at Westminster Abbey in 1661, Sir John Stawell regained his place in parliament as Knight for Somerset however he died the following year.

His son, another John Stawell, was also a royalist, but during the Bloody Assizes following the Monmouth Rebellion he objected to the harsh treatment handed out by Judge Jeffreys. Stawell refused to provide accommodation for Jeffreys who then ordered two prisoners, Colonel Bovett and Thomas Blackmore to be hanged on the gateway of the manor.

Some repairs were carried out and the house significantly reduced in size, and then lived in as a farmhouse for the subsequent 200 years. The 17th-century Banqueting Hall, which may have been a Dower house, with 19th-century additions has survived.

In 1791 the estate, which consisted of 11 farmhouses, 54 cottages and two dwelling houses, was purchased by Edward Jeffries (died 1814). It was passed down through his family to his grandson, Edward Jeffries Esdaile (died 1867), who married the daughter of the poet Percy Bysshe Shelley. Esdaile built Cothelstone House as a new residence between 1817 and 1820. Cothelstone House was demolished in 1968. Esdaile also rebuilt the old manor house in 1855–1856, to the style in which the Stawell's had lived before the Civil War.

It is now used as a venue for weddings and corporate events and has been used as a film location.

== Gatehouse ==
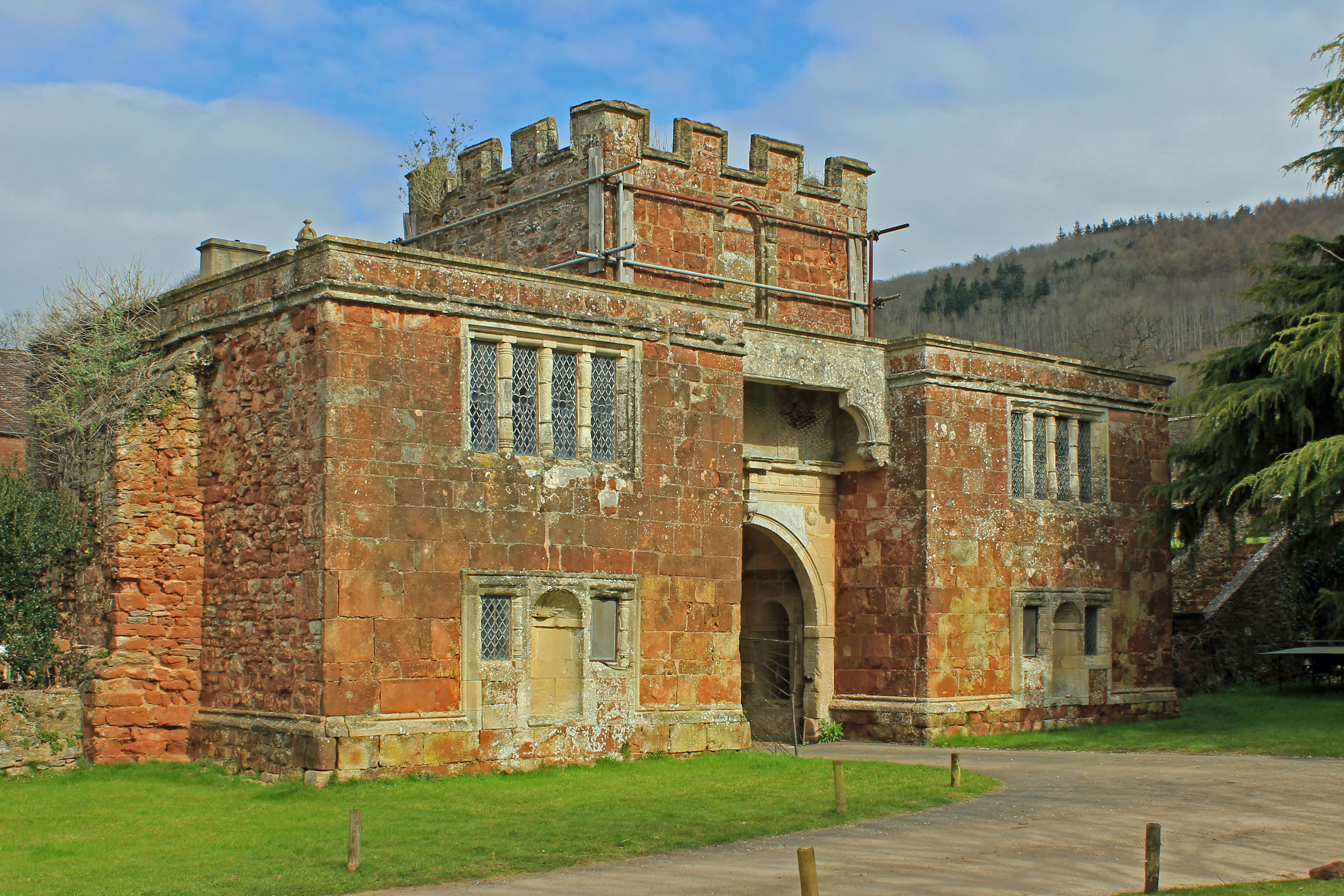
The Gatehouse

The 16th-century gatehouse, has been designated as a Grade I listed building. It is included in the Heritage at Risk Register produced by English Heritage.

== Grounds and outbuildings ==
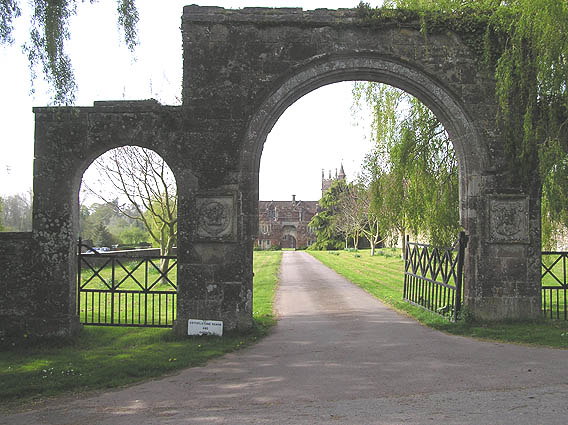
The gateway

During the medieval era the estate included a deer park on Cothelstone Hill which is 1.3 kilometres (0.8 mi) away, orchards and ponds.

To the north and east of the house are formal gardens of around 1 hectare (2.5 acres) which was built over for a model farm in 1867, within the restored medieval park which is listed on the English Heritage National Register of Historic Parks and Gardens.

The three-arched gateway was built in the 16th century to stand across the road rather than the drive but was relocated before 1908. At the end of the Monmouth Rebellion and the defeat of the Duke of Monmouth at the Battle of Sedgemoor in 1685 two men were hanged from the arch of the gateway.

South east of the house are a group of farm buildings dating from 1867 and earlier, some of which are centred around the 16th-century Cushuish Farmhouse.

To the north west 19th-century stables and coach house, a 16th-century gazebo, and 18th-century grotto.

Also within the estate is a wellhouse with a cut stone head dating from around 1500, inspired by an Agnes Cheyney, who married the local squire, Edward Stowel. It is still used as a water supply by the local manor and for the animals, and is being renovated.

On boundary bank at the northern end of the park on Cothelstone Hill is a ruined folly. It is 9 metres (29.5 ft) high and built of rubble stone. The date of construction is unknown. It partially collapsed in the 1990s.

The grounds extend beyond the limits of Cothelstone civil parish into the neighbouring parish of Bishops Lydeard.

== See also ==
- List of Grade I listed buildings in Taunton Deane
