= St Bartholomew's Church, Bathealton =

Church in Somerset, England

St Bartholomew's Church
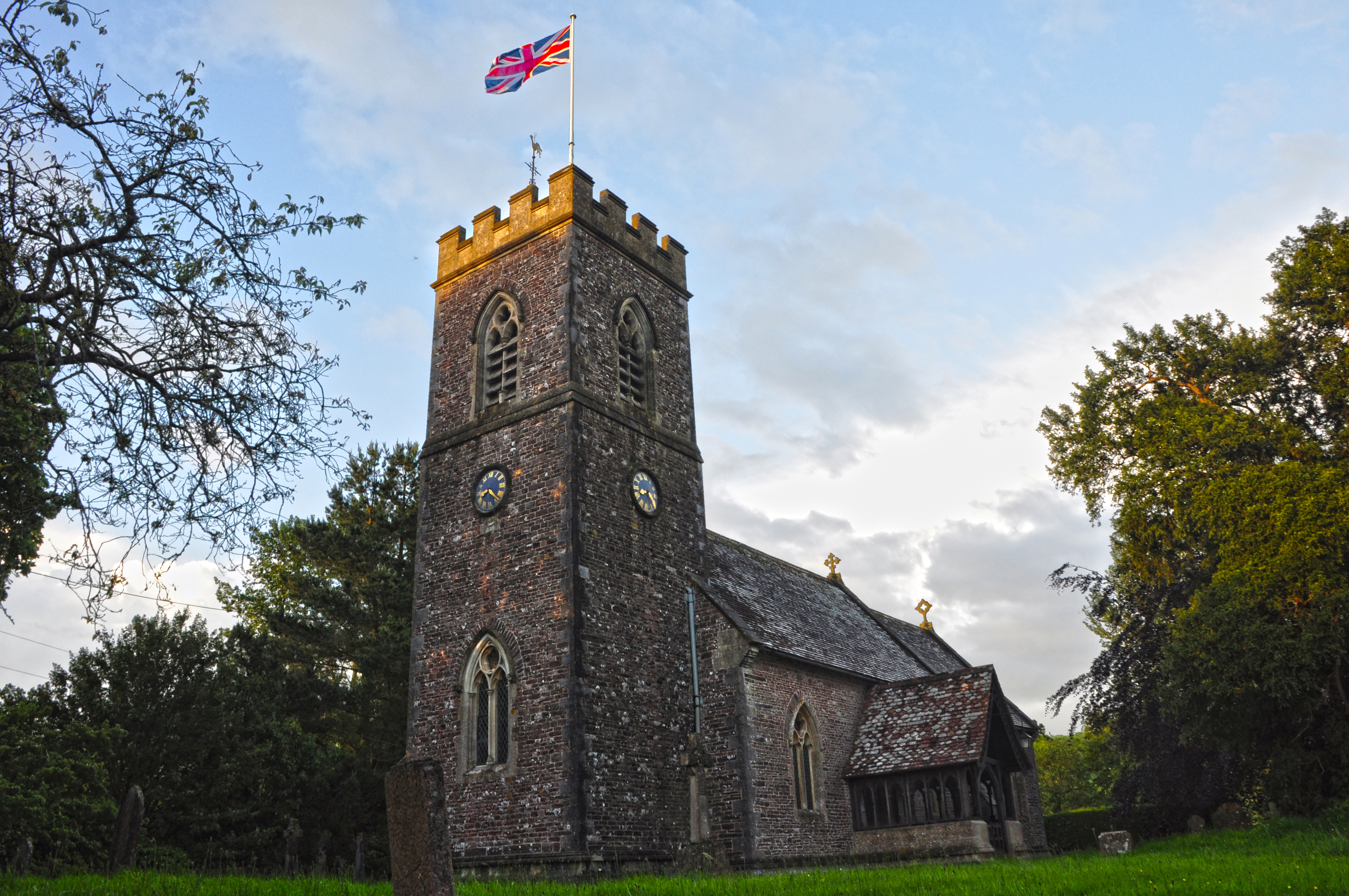

Religion
- Affiliation: Church of England
- Ecclesiastical or organizational status: Active
- Year consecrated: 1854

Location
- Location: Bathealton, Somerset, England
- Interactive map of St Bartholomew's Church
- Coordinates: 51.0085°N 3.3135°W

Architecture
- Architect: Charles Edmund Giles
- Type: Church
- Style: Decorated Gothic

St Bartholomew's Church is a Church of England parish church in Bathealton, Somerset, England. It was built in 1854 to the designs of C. E. Giles and is a Grade II listed building. Today the church is part of the Wellington and District Team Ministry.

== History ==
The first church to be built on the site of St Bartholomew's is believed to date to the early 14th century. The church was rebuilt in the 16th century using money bequeathed by the 1542 will of Elizabeth Siddenham. The chancel was rebuilt in 1774 and other major repairs were later made to the building, but its condition had deteriorated by the 1850s, prompting a faculty to be obtained in 1853 for its demolition and replacement.

Plans for the new church were drawn up by Charles Edmund Giles of Taunton, and it was built at the sole expense of Henry Gorges Moysey of Bathealton Court, for a cost of £1,881. It was consecrated by the Bishop of Bath and Wells, the Right Rev. Robert Eden, on 18 September 1854.

In 1901, Mrs. Burton Borough of Milverton gifted a clock for the church's tower. The church underwent repair in circa 1964, including treatment of the roof timbers and other woodwork in the church for beetle infestation and wet rot, re-pointing of joints in the external masonry, replacement of broken slates on the roof and other general repairs.

== Architecture ==
St Bartholomew's is built of coursed and squared red sandstone, with dressings in white limestone and a tiled roof. The church is made up of a three-bay nave, chancel, north aisle, north-east vestry, south porch and a three-stage west tower. The tower contains four bells and has crenellations and a staircase turret.

The interior contains many fittings dating from the mid-19th century and a four-centred arch arcade with octagonal moulded piers. The church incorporates a lintel from its Elizabethan predecessor, which is now located in the bell ringing chamber.
