= Robert Spurway =

English cricketer

Personal information
- Full name: Robert Popham Spurway
- Born: 16 July 1866; Heathfield, Somerset, England
- Died: 4 December 1898 (aged 32); Woolwich, London, England
- Batting: Right-handed
- Bowling: Right-arm off break

Domestic team information
- Years: Team
- 1889–1890: Natal
- 1893–1898: Somerset
- First-class debut: 27 December 1889 Natal v Port Elizabeth
- Last First-class: 2 June 1898 Somerset v Sussex

Career statistics
Competition	First-class
Matches	20
Runs scored	578
Batting average	18.64
100s/50s	1/2
Top score	108*
Catches/stumpings	3/–
- Source: CricketArchive, 11 November 2010

Robert Popham Spurway (16 July 1866 – 4 December 1898) was an English cricketer who made 20 first-class appearances for Natal and Somerset County Cricket Club. He was a right-handed batsman and a right-arm off break bowler. His best season was in 1894, when he played six times, scoring 223 at an average of 24.77.

== Early and military life ==
Robert Popham, the son of the Reverend Edward Bryan Coombe Spurway, was born in Heathfield, Somerset. He attended Sherborne School from September 1877 to July 1879, then Haileybury College and played for the school's cricket team on at least one occasion. He then attended the Royal Military College, Sandhurst, and in 1887 was gazetted first into the Worcestershire Regiment, which was cancelled later that month, and then into The Royal Scots (Lothian Regiment) as a second lieutenant. He was promoted from lieutenant to captain in March 1896, and seven months later was seconded for service in the Army Pay Department.

== Cricket career ==
Spurway made his first-class debut for Natal in 1889, but had been playing cricket in South Africa for a number of years prior to that. He appeared in a number of matches for Cape Town Wanderers, and faced RG Warton's XI in 1889, the first cricket tour by an English representative team to South Africa. His debut in first-class cricket came in December 1889 against Port Elizabeth, in which he made a half-century in the first innings, top-scoring for his side with 56. He missed his next of four first-class matches, being absent with illness, and appeared twice more in first-class matches for Natal after that.

He made his debut for Somerset in 1893, and reached his second half-century during that season, scoring 55 against Lancashire from number three. His best year in first-class cricket was 1894, when in six appearances he scored 223 runs at an average of 24.77. During this season, he scored his only first-class century, remaining 108 not out in Somerset's first innings against Gloucestershire, helping his side to a six wicket victory. He appeared irregularly after that season, playing twice in 1895 and once in 1898, his final first-class appearance being marked by him scoring a pair.

The Spurway family had close connections with Somerset County Cricket Club; Robert's father was noted in his Wisden Cricketers' Almanack obituary as being "a well-known member" of the club, while his brother, Edward Spurway and two of his brother's sons, Francis Edward and Michael Vyvyan played first-class cricket for the county.
