= Bishops Lydeard Mill and Rural Life Museum =

Museum in Bishops Lydeard, Somerset, England

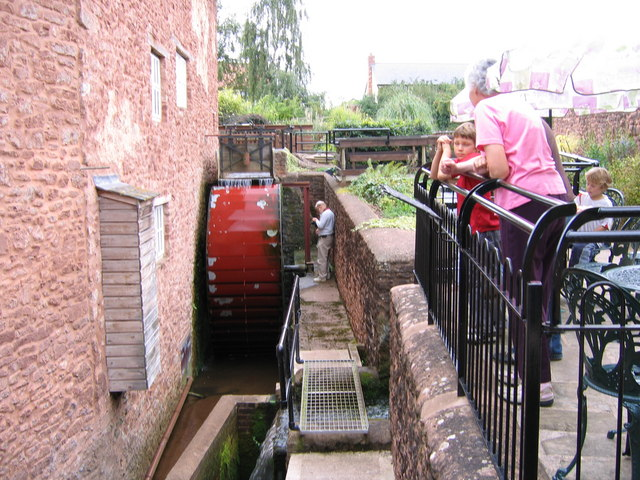

- Shown within Somerset
- Location: Bishops Lydeard, Somerset, England
- Coordinates: 51.0546°N 3.1855°W
- Website: Mill website

The Bishops Lydeard Mill and Rural Life Museum is a historic building and museum in Bishops Lydeard, Somerset, England.

The building dates from the 18th century, and was extended in the early 19th century with the addition of a millhouse. It has an overshot waterwheel and has been designated as a Grade II listed building.

Since 2000 the building has been renovated and was opened by the town Mayor in 2003.

The water wheel weighs over two tonnes and is driven by water from Back Stream which originates in the Brendon Hills.

The museum focuses on traditional trades and crafts including a wheelwright's shop, cooper's shop, saddler's shop, blacksmith's shop and a Victorian kitchen.
