= Church of St Leonard, Otterford =

Church in Somerset, England

Church of St Leonard
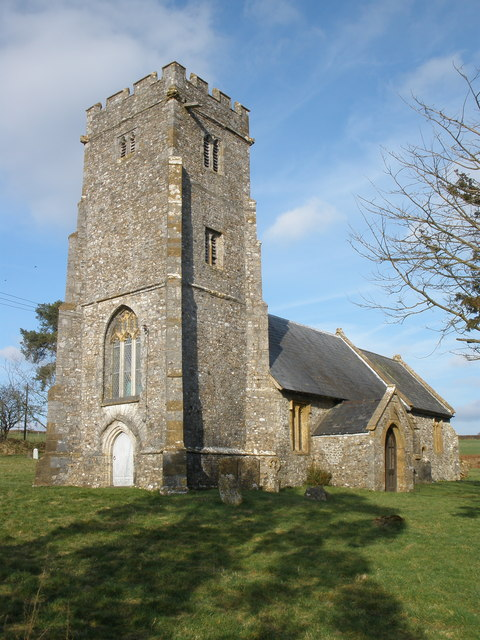

- Location within Somerset
- 50.9231°N 3.1077°W
- Location: Otterford, Somerset, England

History
- Built: 14th century

Listed Building – Grade II*
- Official name: Church of St Leonard
- Designated: 25 February 1955
- Reference no.: 1344635

The Anglican Church of St Leonard in Otterford, Somerset, England was built in the 14th century. It is a Grade II* listed building.

== History ==
The church was built in the 14th century on the site of an earlier church. In 1158 Henry of Blois, the Bishop of Winchester, granted the Chapel of Otriforde to the Taunton Priory.

The church underwent Victorian restoration in 1860.

The parish is part of the Blackdown benefice within the Diocese of Bath and Wells.

== Architecture ==
The limestone building has hamstone dressings. It has a three-bay nave and north aisle along with a chancel and vestry. The chancel barrel vault roof was built in the 16th century. Over the porch is a sundial.

The two-stage tower is 50 feet (15 m) high and supported by diagonal buttresses.

== See also ==
- List of ecclesiastical parishes in the Diocese of Bath and Wells
