= Church of St Bartholomew, Oake =

Church in Somerset, England

Church of St Bartholomew
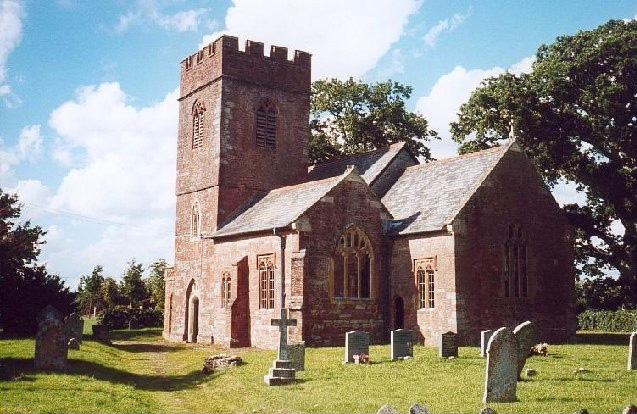

- Location within Somerset
- 51.0197°N 3.2096°W
- Location: Oake, Somerset, England

History
- Built: 13th century

Listed Building – Grade II*
- Official name: Church of St Bartholomew
- Designated: 25 January 1956
- Reference no.: 1307395

The Church of St Bartholomew in Oake, Somerset, England was built in the 13th century. It is a Grade II* listed building.

== History ==
The first part of the church was built in the 13th and 14th centuries with the porch being added in the 15th and the upper stage of the tower around 1536.

The parish is part of the Deane Vale benefice within the Diocese of Bath and Wells.

== Architecture ==
The red sandstone building has hamstone dressings.

The window in the north wall was brought from Taunton Priory. The font is Saxon, and the octagonal pulpit from the 17th century.

A large 150 year old cedar tree in the churchyard was blown over in 2014.

== See also ==
- List of ecclesiastical parishes in the Diocese of Bath and Wells
