= John Stawell =

English landowner and MP

Sir John Stawell MP, JP KB
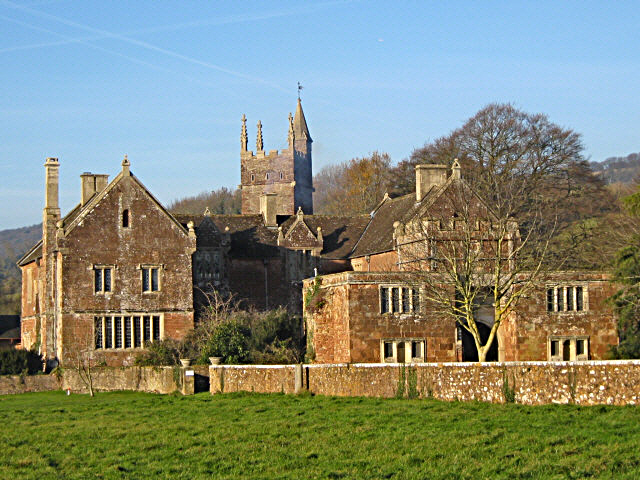
- Cothelstone Manor (rebuilt in 19th century), with church of St Thomas behind

Member of Parliament for Somerset 1625
- In office April 1661 – March 1662

Royalist Governor of Taunton
- In office 1643–1645

High Sheriff of Somerset
- In office 1628–1628

Personal details
- Born: 29 August 1600 Cothelstone Manor, Somerset
- Died: 21 February 1662 (aged 61) Cothelstone Manor, Somerset
- Resting place: St Thomas, Cothelstone
- Spouse: Elizabeth Killigrew (died 1657)
- Children: Five sons, two daughters
- Parent(s): Sir John Stawell, Elizabeth Touchet
- Education: Queen's College, Oxford
- Occupation: Landowner

Military service
- Allegiance: Royalists
- Years of service: 1642 to 1646
- Rank: Colonel
- Battles/wars: First English Civil War; Bridgwater; Exeter 1646

Sir John Stawell or Stowell, 29 August 1600 – 21 February 1662, was MP for Somerset at various times from 1625 to 1662, and one of the leading Royalists in the West Country during the First English Civil War.

Captured at Exeter in 1646, he was excluded from the general pardon, and held in the Tower of London until 1653. After the Stuart Restoration in 1660, his estates were returned and he was re-elected to the Cavalier Parliament in April 1661.

== Personal life ==
John Stawell was born in August 1600, eldest surviving son of Sir John Stawell of Cothelstone Manor and Elizabeth Tuchet, daughter of the Earl of Castlehaven.

He married Elizabeth Killgrew (died 1657) in December 1617; they had two daughters, and five sons who survived to adulthood, three of whom fought for the Royalists in the First English Civil War.

== Career ==
Educated at Queen's College, Oxford, Stawell was elected Member of Parliament in 1625 for Somerset. Created a Knight of the Bath by Charles I in 1625, he supported the Forced Loans imposed when Parliament refused to approve taxes. As a result, he was not elected in 1628, and Charles appointed him High Sheriff of Somerset.

The Somerset gentry were split between those like Sir John who supported Lord Poulett, and their opponents, led by Sir Robert Phelips. Phelips was a prominent opponent of Charles' Personal Rule, and it is suggested Stawell's support for the king in the 1630s was primarily aimed at undermining his local rivals.

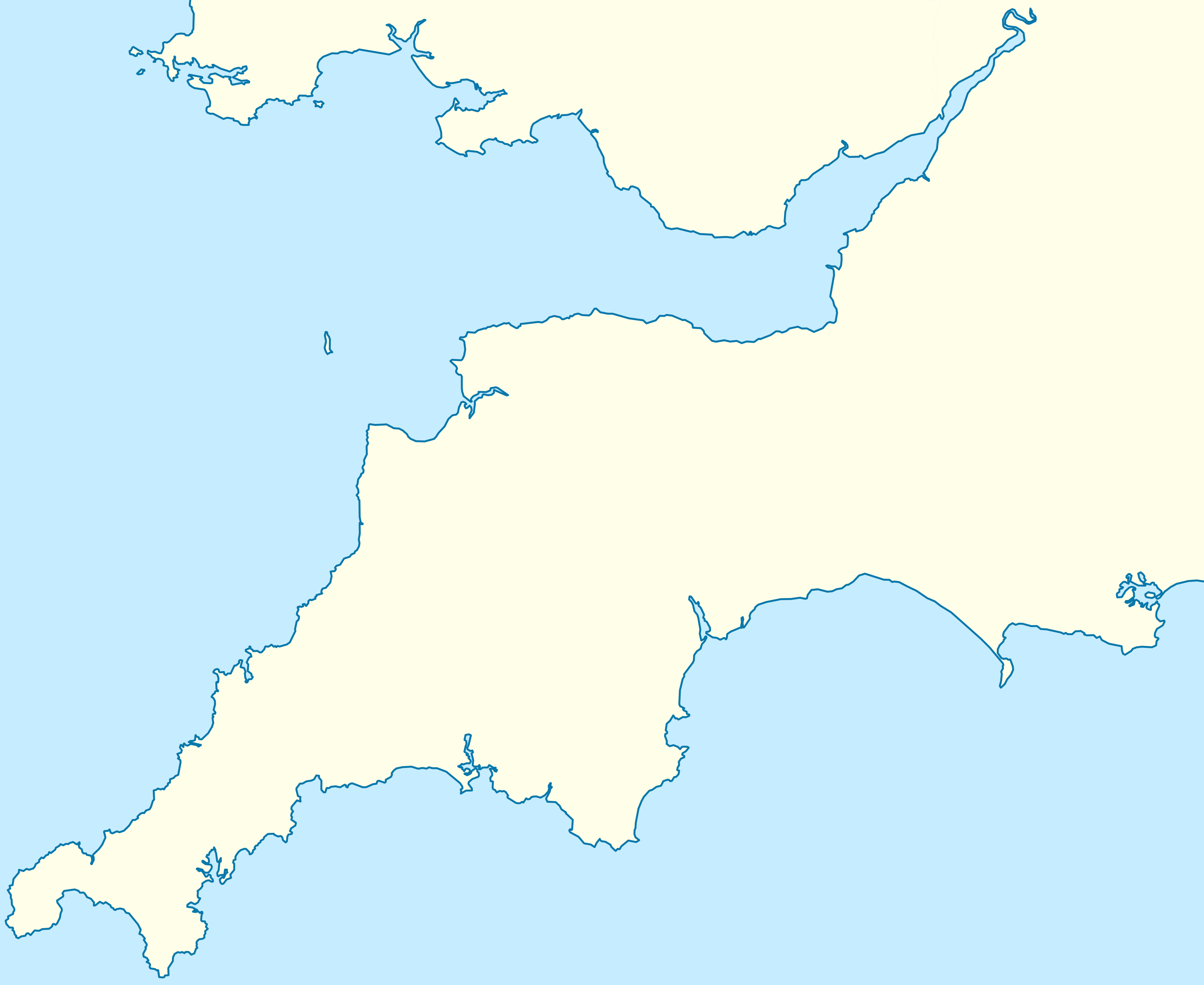
The 1645 campaign in the West

Re-elected for Somerset in the Long Parliament of 1640, he supported Charles when the First English Civil War began in August 1642, and was suspended from Parliament in 1643. At the outbreak of the war he commanded a regiment of the Somerset Trained Bands, which may have formed the basis of his later regiments. A man of considerable wealth, he raised five regiments at his own expense for the Royal army, serving under the Marquess of Hertford in the West Country. He was appointed governor of Taunton when it surrendered to the Royalists in June 1643, but withdrew to Bridgwater before it was recaptured by the Parliamentarian army in June 1644.

In September 1644, he urged Charles to make peace, a campaign he continued over the next year. Many on both sides wanted to end the war; Stawell proposed Charles should put himself at their head, and accompany a peace petition to Parliament. A return to the policy of armed neutrality adopted by various counties in 1642, it also reflected the strength of the Clubmen movement in Somerset, but few of the leaders were prepared to consider such a solution, least of all Charles.

Captured when Exeter surrendered in 1646, he refused to take the covenant, or to swear not to bear arms against Parliament in future, and held on charges of high treason. He was imprisoned in the Tower of London and after many delays finally brought to trial in December 1650, but the High Court referred him back to Parliament. Although much discussed, his case was never settled, and he was not released until 1653.

Following his capture, Robert Blake, commander of the Parliamentarian garrison of Taunton, had been ordered to ensure Cothelstone Manor could not be fortified again. Stawell's lands were sold for £64,000 in 1651, although his family were allowed to live in the semi-ruined manor house. He reportedly spent his time "practising chemistry and eschewing breakfast", presumably an ironic reference to his poverty. His estates were restored after the Stuart Restoration in May 1660, and he was elected to the Cavalier Parliament in 1661.

== Death ==
He died on 21 February 1662, and was buried in the Church of St Thomas of Canterbury, Cothelstone. He was succeeded by his son George, who died in 1669 and was in turn succeeded by his younger brother Ralph (c.1641–1689). Ralph also sat as an MP and in 1683 was created Baron Stawell.

== Sources ==
- Davidson, Alan (2010). STAWELL, Sir John (1600-62), of Cothelstone, Somerset in The History of Parliament: the House of Commons 1604–1629. Brewer & Boydell.
- Wroughton, John (2008). "Stawell, Sir John". Oxford Dictionary of National Biography (online ed.). Oxford University Press. doi:10.1093/ref:odnb/26331. (Subscription, Wikipedia Library access or UK public library membership required.)
- Wedgwood, CV (1958). The King's War, 1641-1647 (2001 ed.). Penguin Classics. ISBN 978-0141390727.

Parliament of England
Preceded by Sir Robert Phelips; John Symes	Member of Parliament for Somerset; 1625; With: Sir Robert Phelips	Succeeded by Sir Henry Berkeley; Sir John Horner
Preceded by Sir Ralph Hopton; Thomas Smith	Member of Parliament for Somerset; 1640–1642; With: Sir John Poulett	Succeeded by George Horner; John Harrington
Preceded by George Horner; Hugh Smith	Member of Parliament for Somerset; 1661–1662; With: Edward Phelips	Succeeded by John Poulett; Edward Phelips
Preceded by John Symes	Sheriff of Somerset; 1628	Succeeded by ?
