= Edward Spurway =

English cricketer

Personal information
- Full name: Edward Popham Spurway
- Born: 4 April 1863; Heathfield, Somerset, England
- Died: 8 February 1914 (aged 50); Heathfield, Somerset, England
- Batting: Right-handed
- Role: Wicket-keeper

Domestic team information
- Years: Team
- 1885–1914: Somerset
- First-class debut: 20 August 1885 Somerset v Hampshire
- Last First-class: 14 July 1898 Somerset v Gloucestershire

Career statistics
| Competition | First-class |
|---|---|
| Matches | 2 |
| Runs scored | 26 |
| Batting average | 6.50 |
| 100s/50s | 0/0 |
| Top score | 15 |
| Catches/stumpings | 1/0 |
- Source: Cricinfo, 11 November 2010

Edward Popham Spurway (4 April 1863 – 8 February 1914) was an English cricketer. He was a right-handed batsman and wicket-keeper who made two first-class appearances for Somerset County Cricket Club in the late 19th century, and served as the Rector of Heathfield from 1896 until 1914.

== Early and personal life ==
Edward Popham, the son of The Reverend Edward Bryan Coombe Spurway, was born in Heathfield, Somerset. He attended Charterhouse School, and appeared for the school's cricket team in a number of fixtures between 1880 and 1882. He took over from his father as Rector of Heathfield, and continued until his own death. He married Gertrude Mary Bagnall, and the couple had five sons and a daughter. Three of their sons were killed in the First World War: two of the boys, George Vyvan Spurway (1893-1918) and Richard Popham Spurway (1890-1915), attended Sherborne School and their names are recorded in the School's Book of Remembrance.

The Spurway family had close connections with Somerset County Cricket Club; Edward's father was noted in his Wisden Cricketers' Almanack obituary as being "a well-known member" of the club, while two of his sons, Francis Edward and Michael Vyvyan played first-class cricket for the county, as did his brother, Robert Spurway.

== Cricket career ==
He played the first of his two first-class matches for Somerset in 1885. Playing against Hampshire, he scored ten runs for the county in the first innings, batting at number three, and one run in the second innings at number six. Somerset lost the match by eight wickets. His next, and final first-class appearance was made almost thirteen years later, when he played as wicket-keeper for the county in a County Championship match against Gloucestershire in Bristol. In an innings defeat for Somerset, Spurway scored 15 runs after opening the batting in the first innings, but was run out for a duck in the second innings. He played regularly for Wellington Cricket Club, and for the Somerset Stragglers.
