= Bagborough House =

Building in West Bagborough, Somerset, England

Coordinates: 51.0966°N 3.1884°W

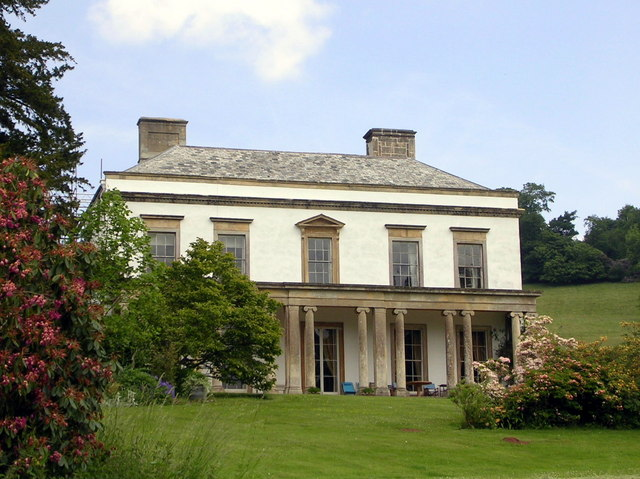
Bagborough House

Bagborough House in West Bagborough, Somerset, England was built circa 1730. It was designated a Grade II* listed building on 4 May 1984.

Bagborough House was built in 1739 by the Popham family, next to St Pancras Church. The saloon has decoration in the style of William Kent which dates from the original construction. The south front which has five Ionic columns, overlooks a landscaped park.

The house was enlarged in 1820 when the stable block was built. Further enlargement took place in 1900.

There is also a listed sundial, and walled kitchen garden.

It has been the venue for various social events including the Hunt Ball of the Devon and Somerset Staghounds.

It was used as one of the locations for the filming of the film Pandaemonium, which was largely shot in the surrounding Quantock Hills.

The house is now lived in by Diana and Philip Brooke-Popham, and used as a wedding venue.
