= Cothelstone =

Village in Somerset, England

Coordinates: 51.0770°N 3.1647°W

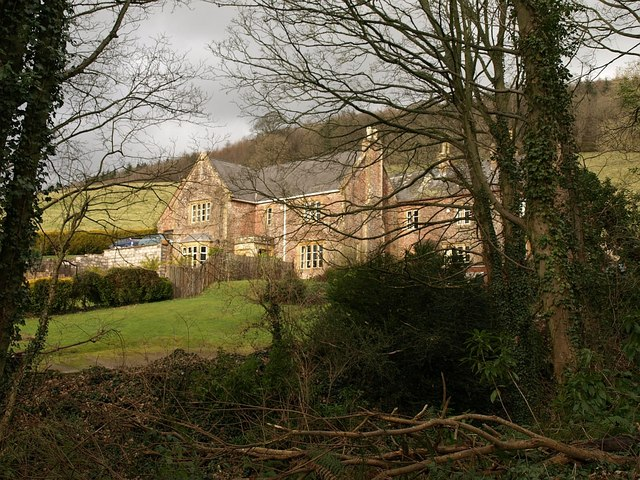
- Vicarage

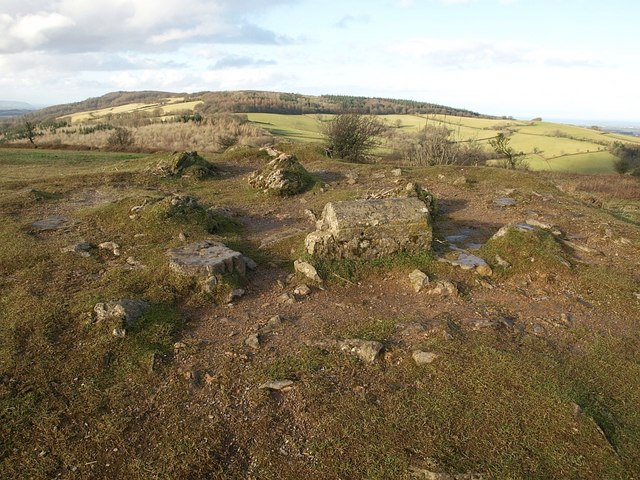
- Summit of Cothelstone Hill

- Location within Somerset
- Population: 111 (2011)
- OS grid reference: ST185315
- Unitary authority: Somerset Council
- Ceremonial county: Somerset
- Region: South West
- Country: England
- Sovereign state: United Kingdom
- Post town: TAUNTON
- Postcode district: TA4
- Dialling code: 01823
- Police: Avon and Somerset
- Fire: Devon and Somerset
- Ambulance: South Western
- UK Parliament: Tiverton and Minehead

Cothelstone is a village and civil parish in Somerset, England, situated in the Quantock Hills six miles north of Taunton. The parish, which includes the hamlet of Toulton, has a population of 111.

The view from Cothelstone with a telescope on a fine day is said to include 14 counties and 150 churches.

== History ==
There are several bowl barrows on Cothelstone Hill.

The manor of Cothelstone was given to the Stawell family after the Norman conquest of England in 1066. The parish of Cothelstone was part of the Taunton Deane Hundred.

During the English Civil War, Sir John Stawell of Cothelstone had raised a small force at his own expense to defend the King. Taunton fell to parliamentary troops and was held by Robert Blake who attacked Stawell at Bishops Lydeard and imprisoned him. After the restoration, Charles II conferred the title of Baron Stawell on Sir John's son, Ralph.

== Governance ==
The parish council has responsibility for local issues, including setting an annual precept (local rate) to cover the council's operating costs and producing annual accounts for public scrutiny. The parish council evaluates local planning applications and works with the local police, district council officers, and neighbourhood watch groups on matters of crime, security, and traffic. The parish council's role also includes initiating projects for the maintenance and repair of parish facilities, as well as consulting with the district council on the maintenance, repair, and improvement of highways, drainage, footpaths, public transport, and street cleaning. Conservation matters (including trees and listed buildings) and environmental issues are also the responsibility of the council.

For local government purposes, since 1 April 2023, the village comes under the unitary authority of Somerset Council. Prior to this, it was part of the non-metropolitan district of Somerset West and Taunton (formed on 1 April 2019) and, before this, the district of Taunton Deane (established under the Local Government Act 1972). From 1894-1974, for local government purposes, Cothelstone was part of Taunton Rural District.

It is also part of the Tiverton and Minehead county constituency represented in the House of Commons of the Parliament of the United Kingdom. It elects one Member of Parliament (MP) by the first past the post system of election, and was part of the South West England constituency of the European Parliament prior to Britain leaving the European Union in January 2020, which elected seven MEPs using the d'Hondt method of party-list proportional representation.

== Landmarks ==
Cothelstone Manor was built in the mid 16th century, largely demolished by the parliamentary troops in 1646 and rebuilt by E.J. Esdaile in 1855–56. The 16th-century gatehouse and gazebo and 17th-century Banqueting Hall have survived.

The nearby St Agnes' Well is a Grade II* Well house dating from the Medieval period and restored in the nineteenth century. It is constructed of coursed red sandstone masonry with corbel roof. Its water is accessed via an arched doorway behind which is a large volume of clear shallow water. The water is also piped off for farm use. It has a varied folklore, noted as being a healing well, a wishing well of considerable power, an aid to fertility, and virgins used divinations to 'discover' their future husbands on the eve of St Agnes's feast day. It is currently undergoing further restoration.

At the summit of Cothelstone Hill is a grove of beech trees known as the Seven Sisters. Originally planted in the 18th century by Mary Hill, Lady Hillsborough, they form a well-known and prominent landmark visible from large areas of Somerset and South Wales.

== Religious sites ==
The red sandstone Church of St Thomas of Canterbury dates from the 12th century and was largely restored in 1864. It includes memorials to the Stawell family including: Sir Matthew de Stawell, died 1379, and his wife Eleanor, and John Stawell, died 1603. The church has been designated by English Heritage as a Grade I listed building.
