= Balt Moor Wall =

Coordinates: 51°03′27″N 2°56′44″W

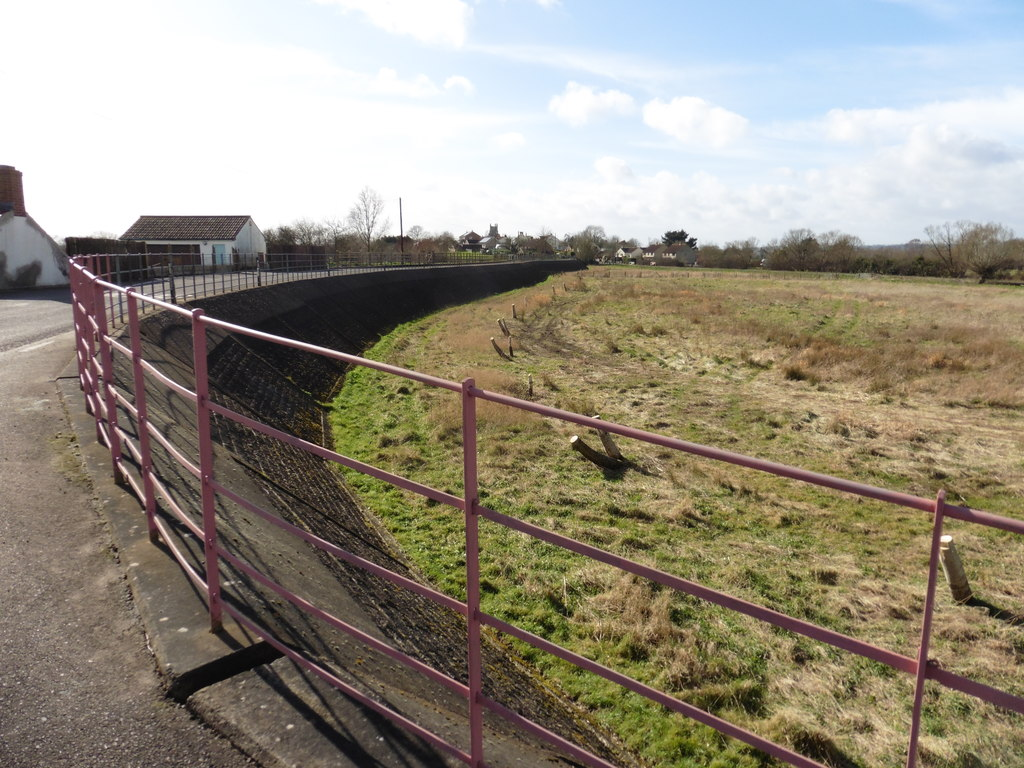
Balt Moor Wall

Balt Moor Wall is an earthwork and listed scheduled ancient monument in Lyng, Somerset, England, situated on the Somerset Levels to the northwest of the River Tone. The site contains the remains of a section of medieval causeway, which now forms a raised embankment between 6 metres (20 ft) and 10 metres (33 ft) wide and up to 2 metres (6 ft 7 in) high.

The structure, which English Heritage refers to as "a rare example of medieval engineering", appears to have been built to protect the Salt Moor from the flooding of the River Tone in the Athelney-Lyng gap.

== History ==
The wall is first mentioned in a charter signed by King Stephen between 1135 and 1154, when monks from Athelney Abbey were reclaiming some of the land.

The original construction may date from the 9th century, but it is not clear whether this was intended to control the course of the River Tone, or as a causeway between the fortified sites at Lyng and the Isle of Athelney. The Somerset Drainage Commission ordered the causeway to be encased in masonry in 1880. In 1996 the wall was tested for stability, during which medieval pottery was unearthed. Geophysical surveys were carried out in 1987 and 1993 with exploratory trenches being dug in 1996.
