= Bathealton Court =

Country house in Bathealton, Somerset, England

Coordinates: 51.0112°N 3.3152°W

Bathealton Court is a Grade II listed country house in Bathealton, Somerset, England. It was built in around 1766 and underwent significant alteration in around 1850. The north wing was demolished in the 1960s.

== History ==
The manor of Bathealton Court was mentioned in the Domesday Book when it was the property of Sir William Moahun, Baron of Dunster Castle. The present house was built in about 1788. The alterations of 1850 were at the hands of Henry Gorges Moysey, who also paid for the construction of Bathealton church in 1854. This had some fine painted glass by John Toms of Wellington. it remained owned by the Moysey family until 1923, when sold by Charles Moysey.In 2006 it again changed hands, being put up for auction. At this time the estate consisted of 141 acres (57 ha) of garden, parkland and woodland and included a farmhouse, stables and lodge.

== The house ==
Bathealton Court was built in about 1766, probably on the site of, and incorporating the structure of, an older building. It is a rendered stone house, with a moulded cornice, slate roofs, and rendered chimney stacks. It originally had a U-shaped plan, but the north wing was demolished in the 1960s. It consists of two storeys plus attics, with single storey bays at either side, giving it a 1:2:3:2:1 bay configuration. The sashed windows have moulded architraves, and the central window on the ground floor is pedimented. The main door is in the single storey porch to the left, and the similar bay on the right has a window and balustrade. The interior has some fine decorative plaster ceilings, a late eighteenth century barley-sugar twist staircase and plain panelling in several rooms. The house was designated as a Grade II listed building on 25 January 1956.

== The gardens ==
Bathealton Court is set in rural surroundings and has an extensive view of the surrounding countryside. The gardens include lawns and kitchen gardens and there is a cottage behind the house previously inhabited by the gardener.
