= Church of St John the Baptist, Heathfield =

Church in Somerset, England

Church of St John the Baptist
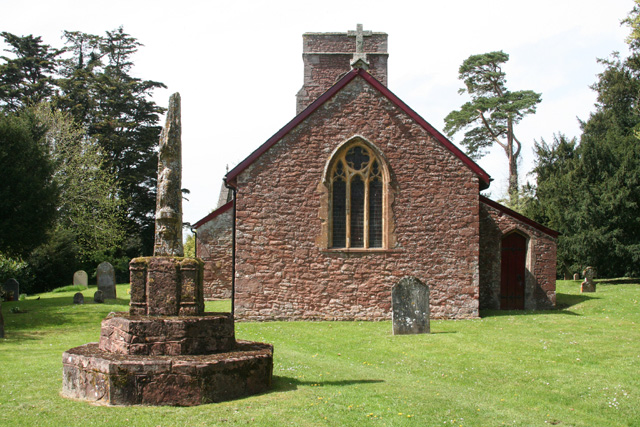
- The churchyard cross

- Location within Somerset
- 51.0313°N 3.1992°W
- Location: Heathfield, Somerset, England

History
- Built: 13th century

Listed Building – Grade II
- Official name: Church of St John the Baptist
- Designated: 25 February 1955
- Reference no.: 1060324

Listed Building – Grade II*
- Official name: Standing Cross, 8m south-east of Church of St John the Baptist
- Designated: 25 February 1955
- Reference no.: 1307462

The Church of St John the Baptist in Heathfield, Somerset, England was built in the 13th century, from which the tower remains. It is a Grade II listed building. The churchyard cross may also be from the 13th century.

== History ==
The church is known to have existed in the 1160s however there may have been a church building on the site before that time.

The current tower remains from the 13th-century building; however, the rest of the church, including the chancel was largely rebuilt as part of Victorian restoration in the 1841 by Edward Ashworth, with the vestry being added in 1869 and 1860. At this time box pews and the font were removed and replaced.

The parish is part of the Deane Vale benefice within the Diocese of Bath and Wells.

== Architecture ==
The red sandstone building has a slate roof. It has a two-bay nave. The south-east chapel is now the organ chamber. The three-stage tower is supported by diagonal buttresses. The tower had fiev beels, the oldest of which dates from 1657. They were recast in 1898.

In the churchyard is a cross which may date from the original construction of the church in the 13th century or from the 15th century. It has an octagonal base with a tapering 1.9 metres (6 ft 3 in) shaft with a carving of a male figure, however the head of the cross is missing.

== See also ==
- List of ecclesiastical parishes in the Diocese of Bath and Wells
