= Bathealton =

Village and civil parish in Somerset, England

Coordinates: 51.00888°N 3.31414°W

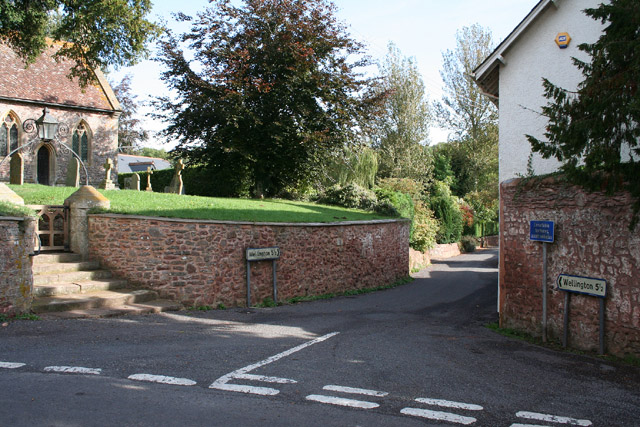
- Access to the Church of St Bartholomew

- Location within Somerset
- Population: 194
- OS grid reference: ST079241
- Unitary authority: Somerset Council
- Ceremonial county: Somerset
- Region: South West
- Country: England
- Sovereign state: United Kingdom
- Post town: Taunton
- Postcode district: TA4
- Police: Avon and Somerset
- Fire: Devon and Somerset
- Ambulance: South Western
- UK Parliament: Tiverton and Minehead

Bathealton is a village and civil parish in Somerset, England, situated 3 miles (4.8 km) west of Wellington and 8 miles (12.9 km) west of Taunton. The village has a population of 194.

== History ==
The Iron Age Castles Camp is approximately 1 mile (1.6 km) west of the village.

It was recorded in the Domesday Book as Badeheltone. The parish of Bathealton was part of the Milverton Hundred.

Bathealton Court is a country house, dating from around 1766, but probably incorporating earlier dwelling. It was remodelled around 1850.

The routes of the Grand Western Canal and the Bristol and Exeter Railway pass within a short distance of the village.

The Village Hall, was previously the Village School until its last intake of pupils in the early 1950s.

== Governance ==
The parish council has responsibility for local issues, including setting an annual precept (local rate) to cover the council's operating costs and producing annual accounts for public scrutiny. The parish council evaluates local planning applications and works with the local police, district council officers, and neighbourhood watch groups on matters of crime, security, and traffic. The parish council's role also includes initiating projects for the maintenance and repair of parish facilities, as well as consulting with the district council on the maintenance, repair, and improvement of highways, drainage, footpaths, public transport, and street cleaning. Conservation matters (including trees and listed buildings) and environmental issues are also the responsibility of the council.

For local government purposes, since 1 April 2023, the village comes under the unitary authority of Somerset Council. Prior to this, it was part of the non-metropolitan district of Somerset West and Taunton (formed on 1 April 2019) and, before this, the district of Taunton Deane (established under the Local Government Act 1972). It was part of Wellington Rural District before that.

Bathealton is also part of the Tiverton and Minehead county constituency represented in the House of Commons of the Parliament of the United Kingdom. It elects one Member of Parliament (MP) by the first past the post system of election, and was part of the South West England constituency of the European Parliament prior to Britain leaving the European Union in January 2020, which elected seven MEPs using the d'Hondt method of party-list proportional representation.

== Religious sites ==
The Church of St Bartholomew dates from 1854 and has been designated as a Grade II listed building. Its chancel retains monuments to the Webers and Moseys, eminent families in the history of the village.
