= St Mary's Church, Bishops Lydeard =

Church in Somerset, England

Church of St Mary
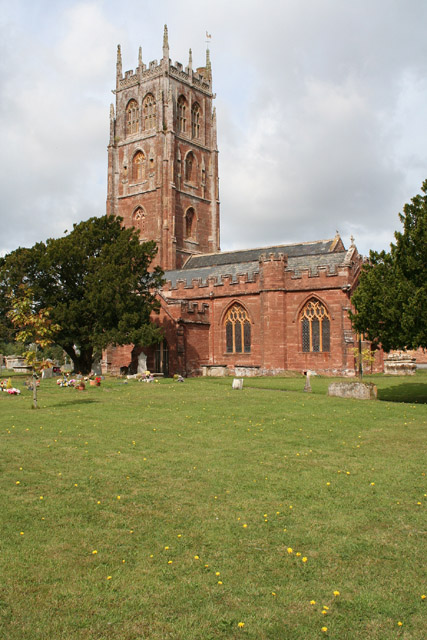

- Location within Somerset

General information
- Location: Bishops Lydeard, England
- Coordinates: 51.0614°N 3.1872°W
- Completed: 14th century

The Church of St Mary in Bishops Lydeard, Somerset, England, dates from the 14th and 15th centuries and has been designated as a Grade I listed building.

In 1860–62 the church was extended by one bay and a vestry, by Edward Jeboult of Taunton, added.

The tower, which was built around 1497, has pierced tracery battlements, pinnacles, set back buttresses terminating in pinnacles at the bell-storey, and pinnacles on the buttresses at each stage. On the stonework are hunky punks which have been severely damaged by the weather, however one appears to represent a Sea serpent.

Between 2010 and 2011, an eleven-month restoration programme, focussing on the tower and costing £240,000, was undertaken by Sally Strachey Historic Conservation, under the supervision of Smith Gamblin Architects.

Several of the tombs in the churchyard are of historical importance, as are two crosses, one dating from the 14th century, the other being the town's market cross which was moved to the churchyard in the 19th century.

== See also ==
- List of Grade I listed buildings in Taunton Deane
- List of towers in Somerset
- List of ecclesiastical parishes in the Diocese of Bath and Wells
