= Francis Spurway =

English cricketer

Personal information
- Full name: Francis Edward Spurway
- Born: 8 August 1894; Winchester, Hampshire, England
- Died: 30 December 1980 (aged 86); Halse, Somerset, England
- Batting: Right-handed
- Role: Wicket-keeper

Domestic team information
- Years: Team
- 1920–1929: Somerset
- First-class debut: 2 June 1920 Somerset v Oxford University
- Last First-class: 20 July 1929 Somerset v Northamptonshire

Career statistics
| Competition | First-class |
|---|---|
| Matches | 23 |
| Runs scored | 328 |
| Batting average | 9.37 |
| 100s/50s | 0/0 |
| Top score | 35 |
| Catches/stumpings | 29/14 |
- Source: CricketArchive, 12 November 2010

Francis Edward Spurway (8 August 1894 – 30 December 1980) was an English cricketer who played 23 first-class matches for Somerset County Cricket Club between 1920 and 1929.

== Early life and military career ==
Francis Edward, the son of The Reverend Edward Popham Spurway, was born in Winchester, Hampshire. He served in the 5th Battalion, Prince Albert's (Somerset Light Infantry) during the First World War. In July 1915 he was assigned as a temporary Captain, which he then relinquished in April 1917, receiving a promotion from Second Lieutenant to Lieutenant at the same time. Later in 1917, he was given command of a Company, and was assigned an acting Captain. In 1928, he relinquished his rank of Lieutenant, and became a Chaplain in the Royal Army Chaplains' Department, having an equivalent rank to Captain (Chaplain to the Forces 4th Class). By 1933, he was serving as a Church of England minister in the parish of Bishop's Hull, Saint John.

== Cricket career ==
Spurway made his first-class cricket for Somerset in 1920 making his highest score for the county during the second innings of the match against Oxford University, scoring 35 runs. He played regularly for the county in 1920 and 1921, appearing 12 times across the two seasons. He played less frequently in later years, with just seven appearances in the next three years. He did not play first-class cricket between 1925 and 1928, but returned to play four matches for Somerset in 1929. He did not play in a modern wicket-keeper / batsman role, in which the wicket-keeper is generally considered a competent batsman, and instead was often part of the tail. He scored 328 first-class runs at an average of 9.37, and took 29 catches and 14 stumpings.

The Spurway family had close connections with Somerset County Cricket Club; Francis' grandfather was noted in his Wisden Cricketers' Almanack obituary as being "a well-known member" of the club, while his father, Edward Popham, uncle, Robert Popham and brother, Michael Vyvyan played first-class cricket for the county.
