= Michael Spurway =

Personal information
- Full name: Michael Vyvyan Spurway
- Born: 24 January 1909; Heathfield, Somerset, England
- Died: 7 July 2007 (aged 98); Corfe, Taunton, Somerset, England
- Batting: Right-handed

Domestic team information
- Years: Team
- 1929: Somerset

Career statistics
Competition	FC
Matches	3
Runs scored	22
Batting average	7.33
100s/50s	0/0
Top score	10
Catches/stumpings	4/1
- Source: CricketArchive, 22 December 2015

Michael Vyvyan Spurway OBE (24 January 1909 – 7 July 2007) was a British civil servant in the Colonial Service and later a businessman. He also played county cricket for Somerset, and served as a pilot in the RAF in the Second World War.

== Early life ==
Spurway and his twin sister were born in Heathfield near Taunton in Somerset, the youngest of six children. His father, Edward Spurway, the local rector, died on 8 February 1914, and three elder brothers were killed in the First World War: two of these brothers, George Vyvan Spurway (1893–1918) and Richard Popham Spurway (1890–1915), attended Sherborne School and their names are recorded in the School's Book of Remembrance. His mother Gertrude Mary Spurway (née Bagnall) was left in difficult circumstances, bringing up her two youngest children. Spurway's surviving brother Francis Spurway was an adult by this time.

He was educated at St Edward's School in Oxford, and read history at Christ Church, Oxford. He enjoyed sports, playing cricket for his college, and winning a half Blue playing hockey for Oxford University. He also flew with the University Air Squadron.

== First-class cricket ==
Spurway played cricket for the Somerset Stragglers while at university. He won a place in the Somerset county team as a wicket-keeper-batsman in three games of first-class cricket in July 1929, but yielded his place in the team to his brother, Francis, who had played irregularly for Somerset between 1920 and 1929: both were substitutes for Somerset's regular wicketkeeper, Wally Luckes, who was ill for much of the season. Michael Spurway played against Leicestershire at Taunton, and against Sussex and Derbyshire at Bath. Free-hitting, he was known as "Slogger Spurway".

His father and an uncle Robert also played cricket for Somerset in the late 19th century, and a cousin, Robert played for Glamorgan in 1943.

== Pre-war career ==
Spurway joined the Colonial Service after graduating in 1931. He served in Nigeria, where he played cricket for Nigeria against the Gold Coast and also played polo.

He moved to Cyprus in 1939, where he also played cricket.

== RAF service ==
He left the Colonial Service in November 1940, and joined the RAF as a pilot. Aged 31, he was put on training duties, and became a flying instructor at Fairoaks, flying Tiger Moths.

He was transferred to the Middle East in 1942, shipped out on a freighter carrying disassembled Spitfires. The aircraft were reassembled at Takoradi on the Gold Coast (modern Ghana), and Spurway volunteered to fly one to Egypt, spending a week flying over the Sahara Desert, Chad and Sudan.

He became the commander of the Middle East Photographic Interpretation Unit in Cairo, and then moved to Italy to join the Advanced Headquarters of the Desert Air Force, where he commanded the Photographic Intelligence Cell. He was involved in the resettlement of refugees in Austria. By the end of the War, he held the rank of Wing Commander, and had been mentioned in dispatches and received the OBE.

He was captain of the Desert Air Force cricket team when it toured England in 1945.

== Post-war career ==
He returned to Cyprus after leaving the RAF, returning to the civil service and becoming chairman of the Nicosia Race Club. He returned to London in 1950, serving in the Colonial Office, administering the Marshall Plan. He was posted to Malaya in 1952, and became head of the Malayan Borneo Defence Secretariat. He won a trophy playing tennis in Malaya. He was then posted to Singapore staying in the Raffles Hotel. He played cricket for Singapore against Malaya.

He retired from the civil service in 1953, and returned to England to become a partner in a management consultancy firm, Urwick Orr, where he advised companies in the steel and brewing industries.

He became an executive director at United Breweries in 1963, and took many other directorships in the drinks industry. He also served as deputy chairman and chief executive of the steel foundry and engineering group, Lake & Elliot.

== Later life ==
He retired to the West Country in 1976. He enjoyed country sports. On one occasion, he shot 250 pheasants at one stand with one gun; another time, he caught a salmon weighing 32 lb. He had also hunted big game in Africa, and enjoyed fast cars, driving an Aston Martin.

In 1998, he visited Anuradhapura in north Sri Lanka.

He married twice. He first married Margaret Plowden-Wardlaw in 1937 and later to Jenna. He was survived by his second son Richard and stepson Johnny Hallyday.

Following the death of Frank Shipston on 6 July 2005, Spurway was thought to be the oldest surviving county cricketer, and, at the time of his death, the last person alive to have played county cricket in the 1920s.
