= King's Castle, Wiveliscombe =

Neolithic hillfort in Somerset, England

King's Castle
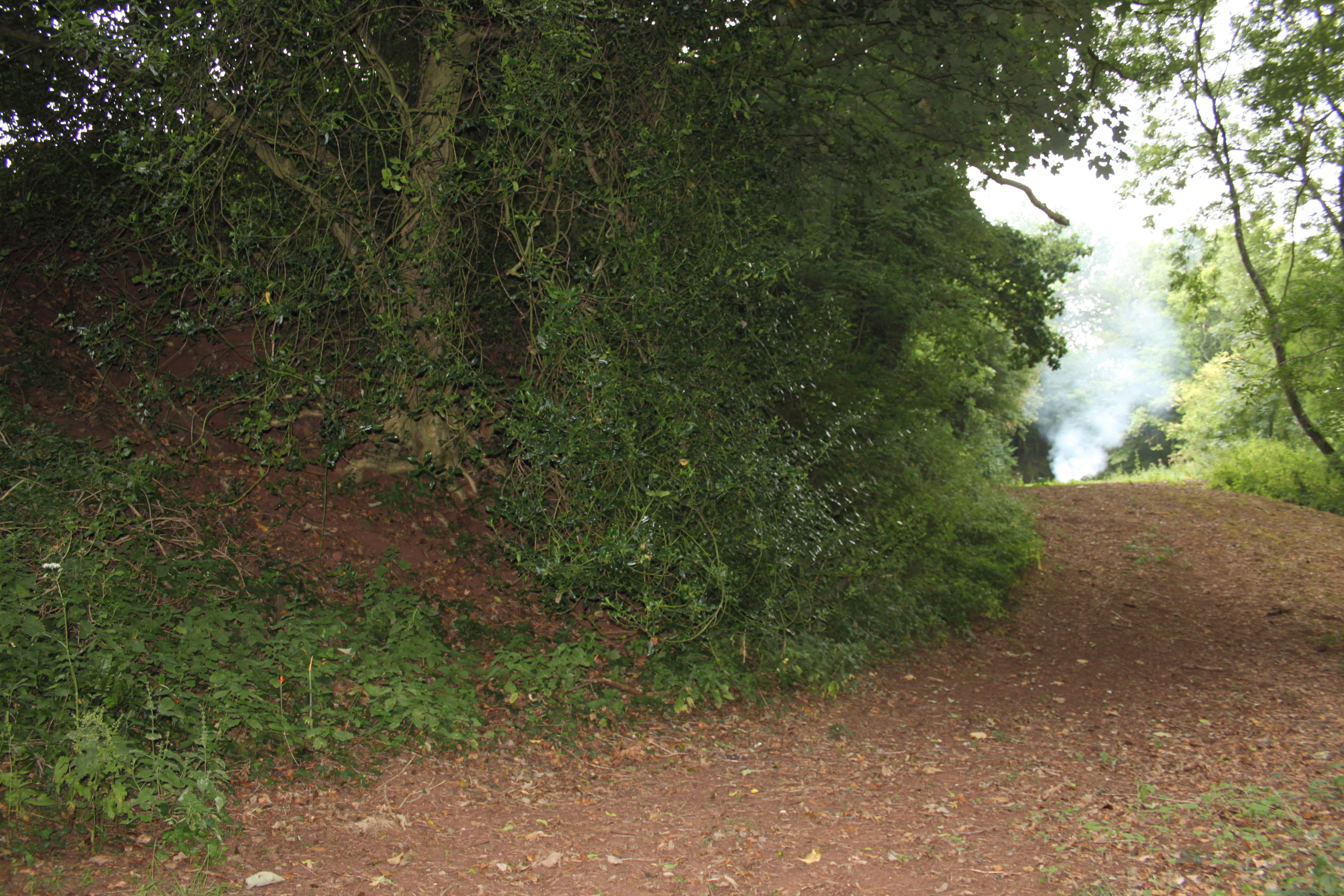
- Earthwork at King's Castle Hillfort

- King's Castle shown within Somerset
- 51°2′45.70″N 3°17′22.26″W
- Location: Wiveliscombe, Somerset, England
- OS grid reference: ST 096 282

History
- Built: During the Stone Age

Site notes
- Architectural style: British pre-Roman Architecture

Scheduled monument
- Official name: King's Castle
- Designated: 7 July 1999
- Reference no.: 188200

King's Castle is an Iron Age Hillfort 1 kilometre (0.62 mi) east of Wiveliscombe in Somerset, England. It is surrounded by two banks with a ditch between them. The inner wall ranges up to 2.5 metres (8.2 ft) high and the outer wall gets up to 1.5 metres (4.9 ft) high. Arrowheads, scrapers, and borers from as far back as the Neolithic period have been found at the site. A coin hoard of 1139 coins was found in a pot buried 0.30 metres (1 ft) deep.

The site has been heavily damaged by repeated quarrying and ploughing.

== Background ==
Hill forts developed in the Late Bronze and Early Iron Age, roughly the start of the first millennium BC. The reason for their emergence in Britain, and their purpose, has been a subject of debate. It has been argued that they could have been military sites constructed in response to invasion from continental Europe, sites built by invaders, or a military reaction to social tensions caused by an increasing population and consequent pressure on agriculture. The dominant view since the 1960s has been that the increasing use of iron led to social changes in Britain. Deposits of iron ore were located in different places to the tin and copper ore necessary to make bronze, and as a result trading patterns shifted and the old elites lost their economic and social status. Power passed into the hands of a new group of people. Archaeologist Barry Cunliffe believes that population increase still played a role and has stated "[the forts] provided defensive possibilities for the community at those times when the stress [of an increasing population] burst out into open warfare. But I wouldn't see them as having been built because there was a state of war. They would be functional as defensive strongholds when there were tensions and undoubtedly some of them were attacked and destroyed, but this was not the only, or even the most significant, factor in their construction".

== See also ==
- List of hill forts and ancient settlements in Somerset
