= Otterford =

Village and civil parish in Somerset, England

Coordinates: 50.9247°N 3.1040°W

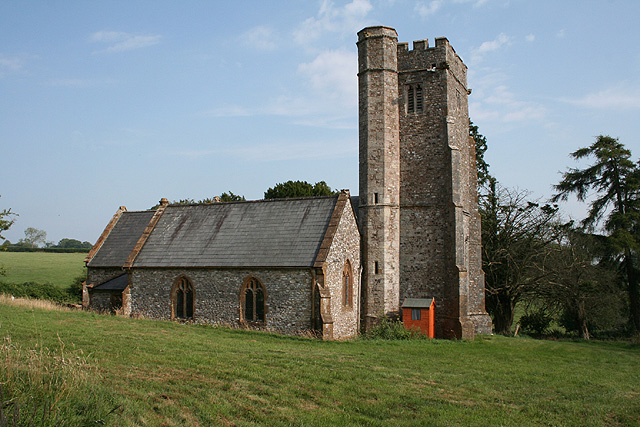
- Church of St Leonard, Otterford

- Location within Somerset
- Population: 356 (2011)
- OS grid reference: ST225145
- Unitary authority: Somerset Council
- Ceremonial county: Somerset
- Region: South West
- Country: England
- Sovereign state: United Kingdom
- Post town: Chard
- Postcode district: TA20
- Dialling code: 01823
- Police: Avon and Somerset
- Fire: Devon and Somerset
- Ambulance: South Western
- UK Parliament: Taunton and Wellington

Otterford is a village and civil parish in Somerset, England. It is situated on the Blackdown Hills, 7 miles (11.3 km) south of Taunton. The village has a population of 356.

The River Otter rises close to Otterford.

== History ==
A series of round barrows on Brown Down are known as Robin Hood's Butts.

The village was named Oteriford in a Taunton charter of 854 by King Æthelwulf of Wessex.

The parish of Otterford was part of the Taunton Deane Hundred.

== Governance ==
The parish council has responsibility for local issues, including setting an annual precept (local rate) to cover the council's operating costs and producing annual accounts for public scrutiny. The parish council evaluates local planning applications and works with the local police, district council officers, and neighbourhood watch groups on matters of crime, security, and traffic. The parish council's role also includes initiating projects for the maintenance and repair of parish facilities, as well as consulting with the district council on the maintenance, repair, and improvement of highways, drainage, footpaths, public transport, and street cleaning. Conservation matters (including trees and listed buildings) and environmental issues are also the responsibility of the council.

For local government purposes, since 1 April 2023, the village comes under the unitary authority of Somerset Council. Prior to this, it was part of the non-metropolitan district of Somerset West and Taunton (formed on 1 April 2019) and, before this, the district of Taunton Deane (established under the Local Government Act 1972). From 1894-1974, for local government purposes, Otterford was part of Taunton Rural District.

It is also part of the Taunton and Wellington county constituency represented in the House of Commons of the Parliament of the United Kingdom. It elects one Member of Parliament (MP) by the first past the post system of election.

== Religious sites ==
The parish Church of St Leonard dates from the 14th century, but was restored, the nave wall rebuilt and the north aisle added in 1860, with further restoration taking place in 1924.
