= Hundred of Taunton Deane =

Historical Hundred of Somerset, England

Taunton Deane Hundred
- Area
  - 1871: 42,389 acres (17,154 ha)
- Population
  - 1871: 27,191
- Status: Hundred
  - HQ: Taunton
- Subdivisions
  - Type: Parishes
  - Units: Angersleigh, West Bagborough, Bradford, Cheddon Fitzpaine, Combe Florey, Corfe, Cothelstone, Heathfield, Hillfarrance, Hull-Bishop's, Kingston, Lydeard St. Lawrence, Norton Fitzwarren, Nynehead, Oake, Orchard Portman, Otterford, Pitminster, Rimpton, Ruishton, Staplegrove, Stoke St. Mary, Tolland, Trull, Wilton, and Withiel Florey

The Hundred of Taunton Deane was one of the 40 historical Hundreds in the ancient county of Somerset, England, dating from before the Norman conquest during the Anglo-Saxon era although exact dates are unknown. Each hundred had a 'fyrd', which acted as the local defence force and a court which was responsible for the maintenance of the frankpledge system. They also formed a unit for the collection of taxes. The role of the hundred court was described in the Dooms (laws) of King Edgar. The name of the hundred was normally that of its meeting-place.

The Hundred of Taunton Deane consisted of the town of Taunton and the ancient parishes of: Angersleigh, West Bagborough, Bradford, Cheddon Fitzpaine, Combe Florey, Corfe, Cothelstone, Heathfield, Hillfarrance, Hull-Bishop's, Kingston, Lydeard St. Lawrence, Norton Fitzwarren, Nynehead, Oake, Orchard Portman, Otterford, Pitminster, Ruishton, Staplegrove, Stoke St. Mary, Tolland, Trull, Wilton, and Withiel Florey. The parish of Rimpton was added to the hundred in about 1735, although it was some distance from the rest of the hundred. In 1871 it covered an area of 42,389 acres (17,154 ha).

Much of the Hundred fell into the great manor of Taunton Deane, which was the property of the Bishop of Winchester. The manor was divided into three separate organisational divisions; the borough of Taunton, the outlying rural parishes which was known as the Liberty or Outfaring and an inner ring lying between the borough and the rural parishes known as the Infaring.

The name derives from Old English dene ('valley'), meaning "valley by Taunton", and survived in the name Taunton Deane, a local government district with borough status. The district was formed on 1 April 1974, under the Local Government Act 1972, by a merger of the Municipal Borough of Taunton, Wellington Urban District, Taunton Rural District, and Wellington Rural District. Taunton Deane was granted borough status in 1975, perpetuating the mayoralty of Taunton.

The importance of the hundred courts declined from the seventeenth century. By the 19th century several different single-purpose subdivisions of counties, such as poor law unions, sanitary districts, and highway districts sprang up, filling the administrative role previously played by parishes and hundreds. Although the Hundreds have never been formally abolished, their functions ended with the establishment of county courts in 1867 and the introduction of districts by the Local Government Act 1894.
