= Bradford Bridge =

Bridge in United Kingdom

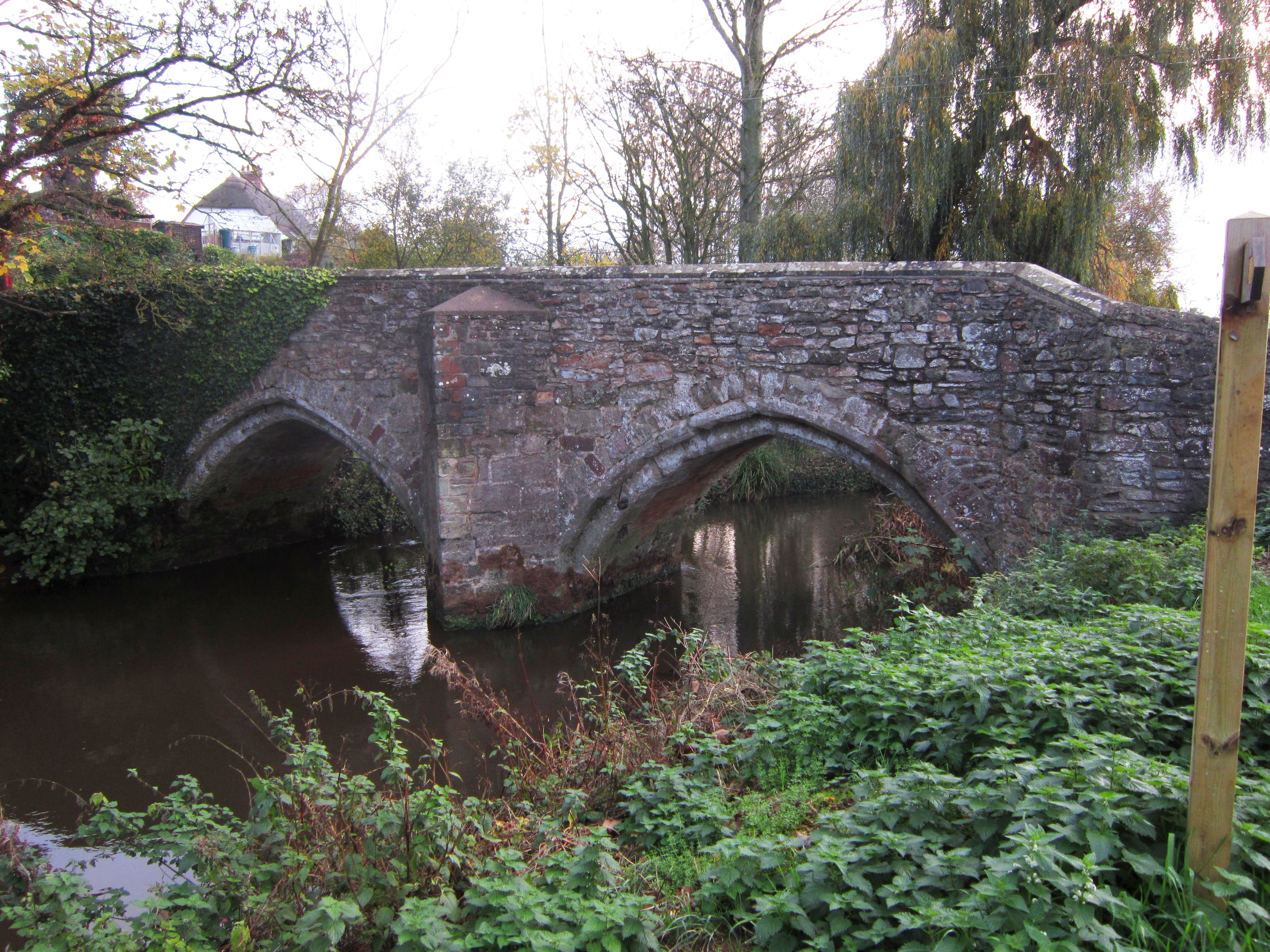
- Coordinates: 51.0004°N 3.1815°W
- Carries: Road
- Crosses: River Tone

Characteristics
- Design: arch
- Material: Stone
- No. of spans: 2

History
- Construction end: 13th to 15th century

Bradford Bridge in Bradford on Tone in the English county of Somerset carries a road over the River Tone. It was built at some point between the 13th and 15th centuries and has been designated as a Grade II* listed building and scheduled as an ancient monument.

By 1667 it had been adopted as a "County Bridge". A marker stone was installed to show the area on either side of the bridge which was the responsibility of the local Justices of the Peace. It can still be seen near the White Horse Inn.

The two arch stone bridge was restored in 1698 and again in the late 19th century.

In 2000 a lorry went through the parapet of the bridge.
