= John Symes (politician, born 1573) =

English politician (1573–1661)

Esq. John Symes

Member of Parliament
- In office 1624–1624
- Monarch: James I
- Constituency: Somerset

High Sheriff of Somerset
- In office 1626–1627
- Monarch: Charles I

Lord Lieutenant of Somerset
- In office 1637–1642
- Monarch: Charles I

Personal details
- Born: 4 March 1573 Somerset, England
- Died: 29 October 1661 (aged 88) Frampton Cotterell, Gloucestershire, England
- Resting place: St. Peter's Church, Frampton Cotterell
- Spouse: Amy Horner
- Children: 3 sons, 8 daughters
- Parent(s): William Symes and Elizabeth Hill
- Education: Exeter College, Oxford (BA, 1591); Lincoln's Inn
- Known for: Landowner, Member of Parliament (1624), Sheriff of Somerset

Military service
- Allegiance: Royalist

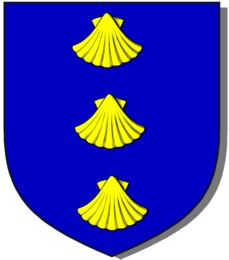
John Symes, Arms granted 1591

John Symes, Esq. (4 March 1573 – 29 October 1661), was a Member of Parliament (MP), High Sheriff, and Justice of the Peace from Somerset. Symes was a Royalist during the English Civil War.

== Personal life ==
John Symes was born on 4 March 1573 in Somerset, England, to William Symes (1544–1597), a successful merchant and landowner, and Elizabeth Hill, daughter of Robert Hill of Taunton. The Symes family achieved recognition in 1591 when William Symes, his father, was granted arms by James I: "Azure, three escallops in pale or".

John was educated at Exeter College, Oxford, where he matriculated in 1588 and graduated with a Bachelor of Arts in 1591. He furthered his studies at Lincoln's Inn.

In 1595, Symes married Amy Horner, daughter of Sir Thomas Horner MP (1547–1612), a knight of the shire for Somerset. Amy Horner's mother, Amy (Popham) Horner (1553–1604) was the daughter of Sir John Popham. Sir John Popham (1532–1607), served as Lord Chief Justice of England and presided over the trials of Sir Walter Raleigh and Guy Fawkes. Sir Thomas Horner was the son of John Horner, Gent and Muriel (Malte) Horner. Muriel Malte, was the daughter of John Malte, tailor to King Henry VIII.

John and Amy had three sons and eight daughters.

== Political and civic career ==
Symes was Justice of the Peace for Somerset (1608–1626, 1627–1645), where he presided over local courts and oversaw administrative duties including poverty relief and road maintenance.

From 1630 to 1632, he served as a Commissioner for Knighthood Compositions.

He supported the king in the English Civil War and was appointed Lord Lieutenant the following year.

In 1643, Symes was appointed Commissioner for Rebels' Estates, managing confiscated Parliamentarian property. He was subsequently fined and took refuge in Gloucestershire during the Cromwellian period.

== Later life and death ==
Following the English Civil War and the restoration of the monarchy in 1660, Symes regained his estates and spent his final years in Frampton Cotterell, Gloucestershire, where he died on 29 October 1661 at the age of 88. He was buried at St. Peter's Church, where his epitaph describes him as a man of "wisdom, justice, integrity, and sobriety".
