= Robin Hood's Butts =

Coordinates: 50.9087°N 3.0866°W

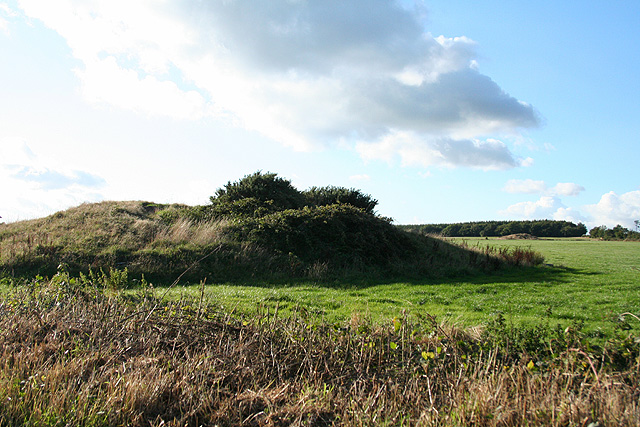
Robin Hood's Butts

Robin Hood's Butts are a group of nine Bronze Age barrows near Otterford on the Blackdown Hills in Somerset, England. They have been scheduled as ancient monuments.

== Description ==
Two of the bowl barrows 210 metres (690 ft) and 600 metres (2,000 ft) north west of Brown Down Cottage are between 28 metres (92 ft) and 88 metres (289 ft) in diameter. The two 380 metres (1,250 ft) west and 685 metres (2,247 ft) north west of Beech Croft are slightly larger with one being 42 metres (138 ft) and the other 44 metres (144 ft) in diameter.

The other barrows are of the round barrow type and are located 100 metres (330 ft) south of School Farm. Four are bowl shaped and the other a bell barrow.

== Origin of names ==
The origin of the name is unknown, however local folklore describes their use by Robin Hood and Little John to play quoits. The name is known to have been used since the 19th century appearing on a tithe map created in 1844.
