= Bradford-on-Tone =

Village and civil parish in Somerset, England

Coordinates: 50.9990°N 3.1799°W

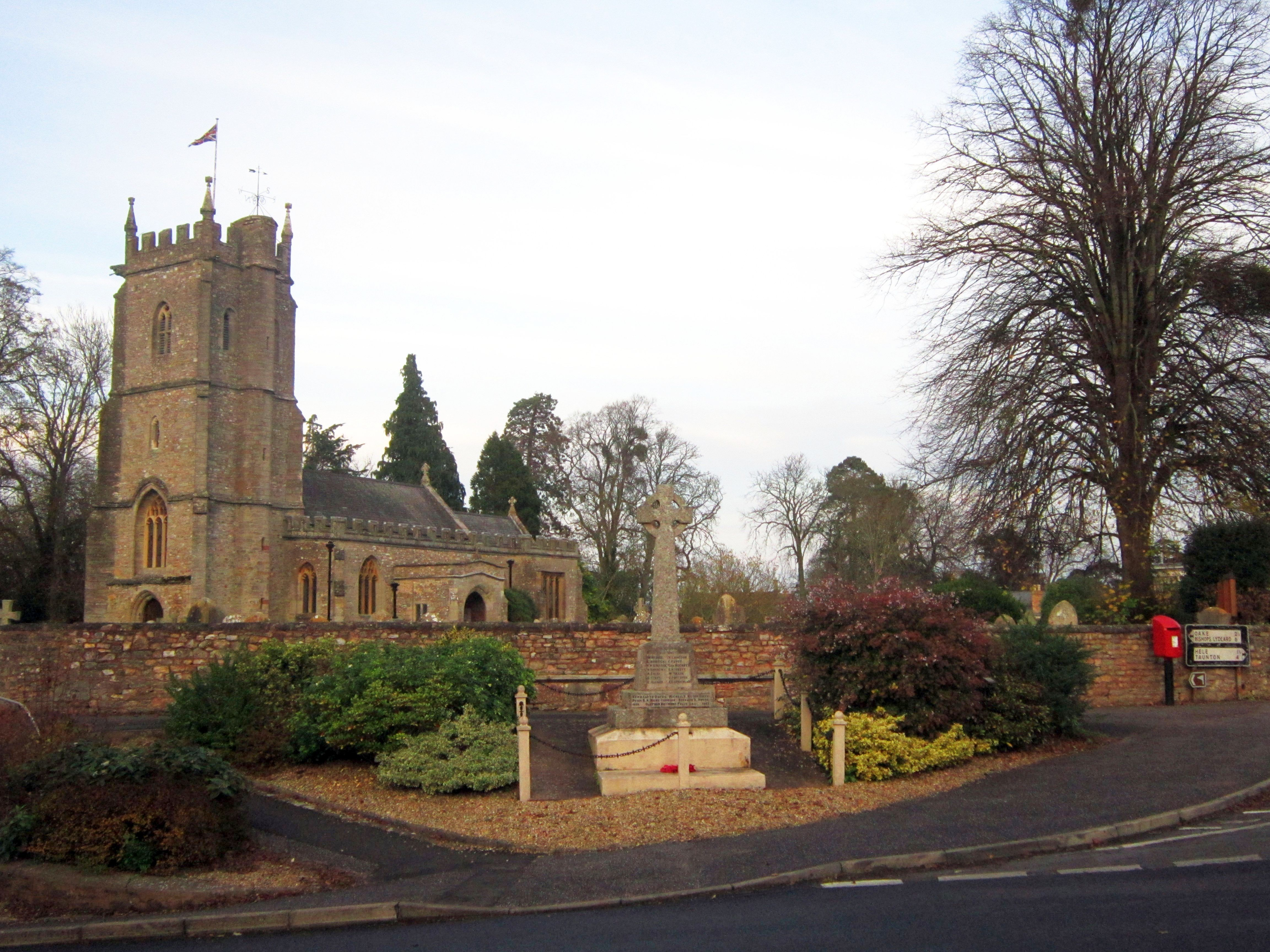
- St Giles Church in village centre

- Location within Somerset
- Population: 622 (2011)
- OS grid reference: ST173228
- Civil parish: Bradford-on-Tone
- Unitary authority: Somerset Council
- Ceremonial county: Somerset
- Region: South West
- Country: England
- Sovereign state: United Kingdom
- Post town: TAUNTON
- Postcode district: TA4
- Dialling code: 01823
- Police: Avon and Somerset
- Fire: Devon and Somerset
- Ambulance: South Western
- UK Parliament: Taunton and Wellington

Bradford-on-Tone is a village and civil parish in Wellington, Somerset, England, situated on the River Tone 4 miles (6.4 km) south west of Taunton. The parish, which includes Tone Green and Hele, has a population of 622.

The village is centred on the meeting of three roads: two of these come from the A38, the main road between the towns of Taunton and Wellington, while the third leads north to the nearby village of Oake. Around this junction are situated the local pub, The White Horse, a war memorial, the Church of St Giles, the Village Hall and some older residential buildings.

== History ==
The name Bradford is undoubtedly English: it shows the village to have stood in Saxon days near a broad ford, or passageway across the River Tone. The parish of Bradford was part of the Taunton Deane Hundred. The 14th-century Bradford Bridge over the Tone is said to have been 'built by the monks', though it is not known which particular monks did the work.

In the 1830s the Grand Western Canal was under construction and included a bridge at Trefusis Farm.

On 16 May 1991 Bradford-on-Tone was the site of a major chemical incident when a train carrying kerosene, petrol and diesel was derailed and caught fire. The fire service took two days to put the fire out and there was significant environmental damage. The cause of the accident was an axle failure on one of the tank wagons.

== Governance ==
The parish council has responsibility for local issues, including setting an annual precept (local rate) to cover the council's operating costs and producing annual accounts for public scrutiny. The parish council evaluates local planning applications and works with the local police, district council officers, and neighbourhood watch groups on matters of crime, security, and traffic. The parish council's role also includes initiating projects for the maintenance and repair of parish facilities, as well as consulting with the district council on the maintenance, repair, and improvement of highways, drainage, footpaths, public transport, and street cleaning. Conservation matters (including trees and listed buildings) and environmental issues are also the responsibility of the council.

For local government purposes, since 1 April 2023, the village comes under the unitary authority of Somerset Council. Prior to this, it was part of the non-metropolitan district of Somerset West and Taunton (formed on 1 April 2019) and, before this, the district of Taunton Deane (established under the Local Government Act 1972). From 1894-1974, for local government purposes, the village was part of Wellington Rural District.

There is also an electoral ward in the same name. The ward however stretches northwards to Oake and west to Langford Budville. The total population of this ward at the 2011 census is 2,337.

It is also part of the Taunton and Wellington county constituency represented in the House of Commons of the Parliament of the United Kingdom. It elects one Member of Parliament (MP) by the first past the post system of election. It was part of the South West England constituency of the European Parliament prior to Britain leaving the European Union in January 2020, which elected seven MEPs using the d'Hondt method of party-list proportional representation.

== Church of St Giles ==
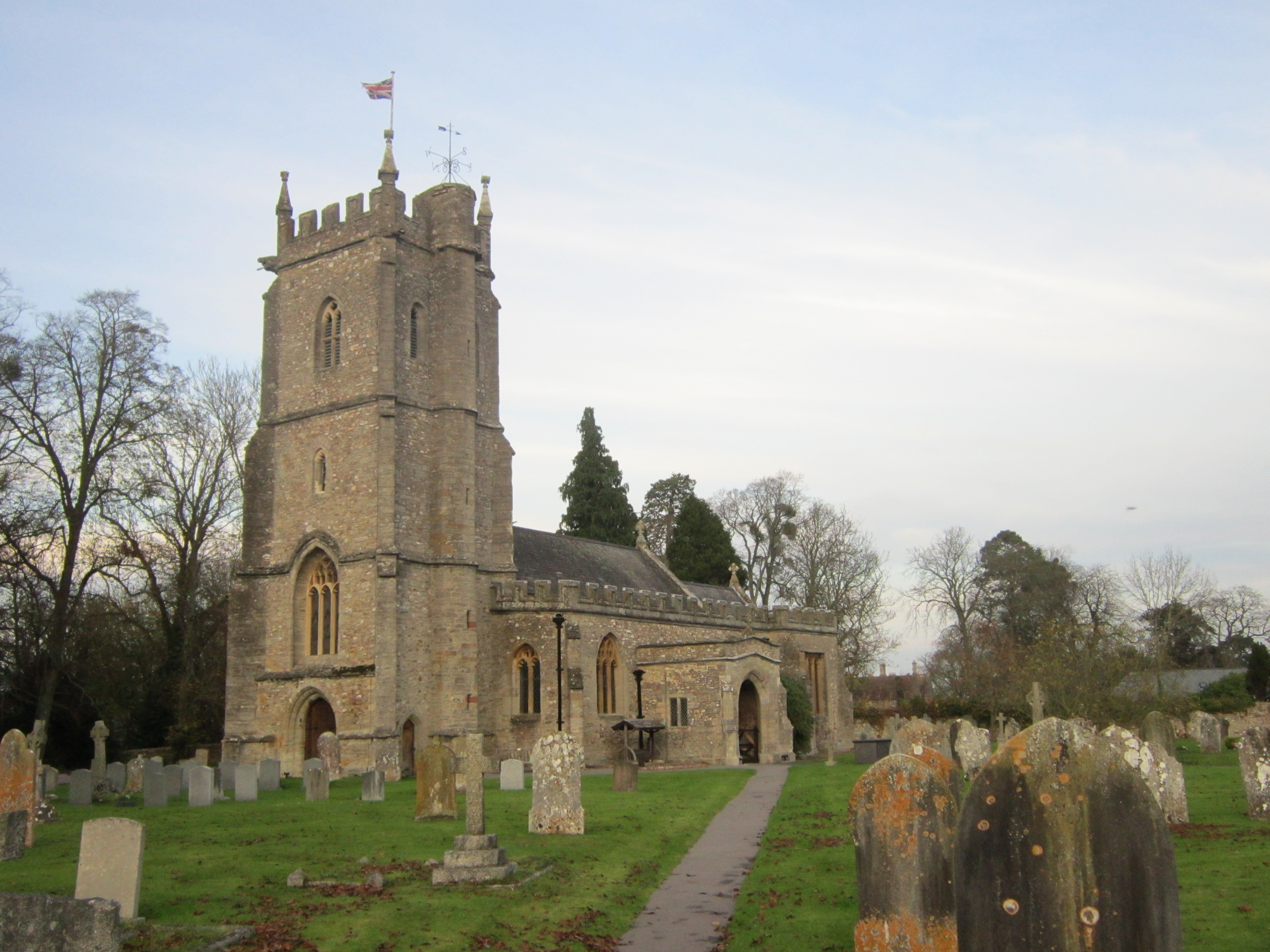
St Giles' church

Bradford church is dedicated to St Giles, but it hasn't been referred to as such until 1754. It is a Grade II* listed building. An old will of 1466 mentions the Church of "Our Lady" of Bradford, and an inscription on one of the bells refers to 'Ave Maria Gratia Plena', suggesting that the earlier dedication was to the Blessed Virgin Mary. The change was likely made some time after the English Reformation. The church was most fortunate in not being stripped of its bells at the Dissolution during Henry VIII's reign.

The church is assumed to stand on the site of a former Saxon wooden church. The general design and character of the current church are 13th century Early English. In 1858–1859, the church was extensively renovated, with one wall strengthened, the pews and the whole roof replaced. The effigy of Sir John de Merriet, Lord of the Manor and Patron of the Church from 1350–1391, shown as a knight in armour, had its elbow cut away to make room for the pews during the renovation.

The church tower has an historic three-trained clock with no dial, dating back to at least 1720. The clock, striking the quarter and full hours, was restored to working order in December 2001, with automatic winding installed. Four of the six bells in the tower are pre-reformation, two of them dated 1450 and another two 1520. The two newer bells are from 1646 and 1811.

An organ was first installed in the church in 1867, but the present organ dates from 1913, having been completely restored in 1951. Additional improvements to the organ were made in 1981. The pulpit, which may have been moved from St Mary Magdalene in Taunton and dates from the early 18th century.

The churchyard contains Commonwealth war graves of two British Army soldiers of World War I and a notable Royal Air Force officer of World War II, Air Vice Marshal John Cole-Hamilton.

== Gallery ==
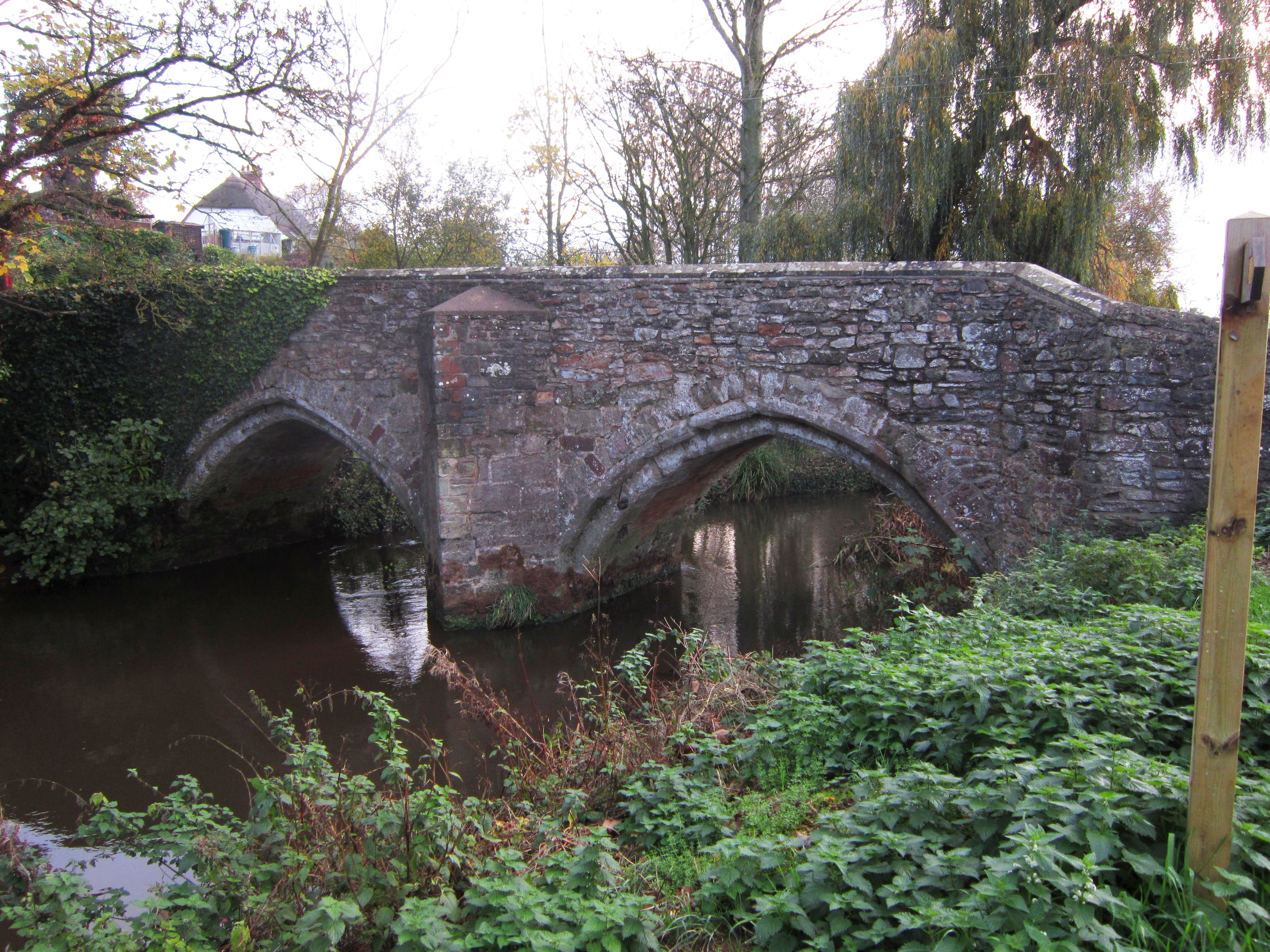
14th-century Bradford Bridge

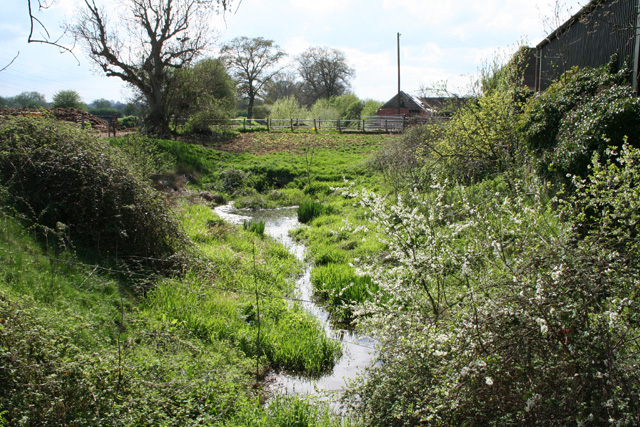
The remains of the old canal by Trefusis Farm. One of the canal's seven lifts was located near here.
