= West Bagborough =

Village in Somerset, England

Coordinates: 51.0935°N 3.1849°W

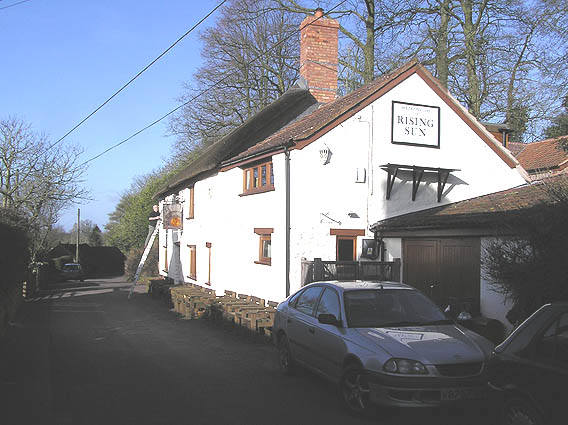
- The Rising Sun, West Bagborough

- Location within Somerset
- Population: 358 (2011)
- OS grid reference: ST171333
- Unitary authority: Somerset Council
- Ceremonial county: Somerset
- Region: South West
- Country: England
- Sovereign state: United Kingdom
- Post town: Taunton
- Postcode district: TA4
- Dialling code: 01823
- Police: Avon and Somerset
- Fire: Devon and Somerset
- Ambulance: South Western
- UK Parliament: Tiverton and Minehead

West Bagborough is a village and civil parish in Somerset, England, about 5 miles (8.0 km) north of Taunton. In 2011, the village had a population of 358.

The parish of West Bagborough lies on the south-west slopes of the Quantock Hills within the Quantock Hills A.O.N.B and encompasses the neighbouring hamlets of Shopnoller and Seven Ash. The village has a wide variety of properties, with a wide range of building techniques and ages. Due to its availability, local red sandstone features heavily in buildings, both ancient and modern. The village has a 16th-century inn (the Rising Sun), a village hall, and a number of establishments offering accommodation.

== History ==
The origin of the village name is open to some debate and is thought to either come from the name "Begas Barrow" (meaning badger's hill) or from an amalgamation of the family name "Baga" and the Old English word for hill, "beorg". In either case, by 1086, when the Domesday Book was compiled, the name had become Bageberge.

The Domesday book records that Ralph Paynel and a Breton knight, William of Mohun, held the land directly from the crown having replaced Merleswein and Leofric who had held it prior to the conquest. Each man's holdings were valued at 2 pounds and 10 shillings (£2/10/-) and 5 pounds (£5/-) annually.

The Quantock Hills, although small in extent, is one of the few remaining expanses of open moorland in southern Britain. Its archaeological importance lies in the existence of a landscape displaying examples of well-preserved monuments tracing human exploitation of the hills from the Bronze Age onwards, giving insights into changes in the pattern of land use on the hills through time. Wills Neck, a high, broad plateau in the southern region of the Quantock Hills, between Middle Hill and Bagborough Hill, is the site of several bowl barrows and cairns dating from the Bronze Age. These earthworks are one of the key features of the Quantocks' broader landscape character. Round barrows, locally known as cairns, and constructed as earthen or rubble mounds, are prehistoric funerary monuments dating from the Bronze Age (c.2000-700 BC) .

Triscombe Stone lies on the boundary between the parishes of West Bagborough and Over Stowey and the old parish of Crowcombe. The stone also lies at the junction of two important routes across the hills, where the east west road from Triscombe to Cockercombe crosses the north-south track along the western ridge, and commands views west to the Brendon Hills and Exmoor. The stone is not impressive, standing only 0.75m high, but it is certainly of considerable antiquity – a map of 1609 has the legend ‘the way to triscombe stone’ (SRO 1609) – and is very likely to be of prehistoric origin. This is reinforced by its location on the western scarp of the hills, close to the Great Hill and Wills Neck barrow.

The parish of West Bagborough was part of the Taunton Deane Hundred.

A colourful and often repeated tale relates to the relative isolation of village church. This is allegedly due to the Black Death, which having struck the village during the fourteenth century, reduced the population to below one hundred. In an attempt to rid themselves of this plague the villagers, so the story goes, abandoned the original settlement and re-built it further to the east, away from the church. Earthworks to the south-west of the church, visible in aerial photographs, in the parklands of Bagborough House may lend credence to this claim.

Enclosure of lands within the parish was authorised by an Act of Parliament in 1806.

In October 2001 a hoard of 4th-century Roman silver was discovered in the village. The 681 coins included two denarii from the early 2nd century and eight miliarense and 671 siliqua all dating from the period AD 337 – 367. The majority were struck in the reigns of emperors Constantius II and Julian and derive from a range of mints including Arles and Lyon in France, Trier in Germany and Rome. It became known as the West Bagborough Hoard.

== Governance ==
The parish council has responsibility for local issues, including setting an annual precept (local rate) to cover the council’s operating costs and producing annual accounts for public scrutiny. The parish council evaluates local planning applications and works with the local police, district council officers, and neighbourhood watch groups on matters of crime, security, and traffic. The parish council's role also includes initiating projects for the maintenance and repair of parish facilities, as well as consulting with the district council on the maintenance, repair, and improvement of highways, drainage, footpaths, public transport, and street cleaning. Conservation matters (including trees and listed buildings) and environmental issues are also the responsibility of the council.

For local government purposes, since 1 April 2023, the village comes under the unitary authority of Somerset Council. Prior to this, it was part of the non-metropolitan district of Somerset West and Taunton (formed on 1 April 2019) and, before this, the district of Taunton Deane (established under the Local Government Act 1972). From 1894-1974, for local government purposes, West Bagborough was part of Taunton Rural District.

It is also part of the Tiverton and Minehead county constituency represented in the House of Commons of the Parliament of the United Kingdom. It elects one Member of Parliament (MP) by the first past the post system of election.

== Church ==
The village church of St Pancras, dates from the 15th century, with the north aisle being added in 1839, and further restoration in 1872. It has been designated by English Heritage as a Grade II* listed building. Further work was undertaken in the 1920s under the guidance of Sir Ninian Comper. The church stands high above the main village, and allegedly owes this separation to the Black Death in the fourteenth century (see above). The lychgate is dedicated to the memory of Robert Brooke-Popham.

The old rectory is now known as Little Court.

== Bagborough House ==
Bagborough House was built in 1739 by the Popham family, enlarged in 1820 and 1900, and is now lived in by Diana and Philip Brooke-Popham.
