= Oake =

Village and civil parish in Somerset, England

Coordinates: 51.0226°N 3.2061°W

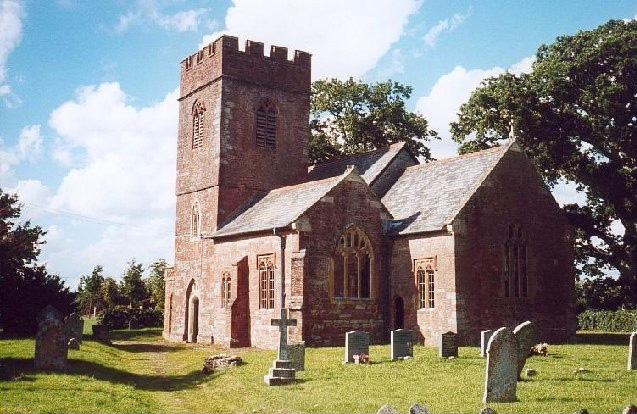
- Church of St Bartholomew, Oake

- Location within Somerset
- Population: 765 (2011)
- OS grid reference: ST155255
- Unitary authority: Somerset Council
- Ceremonial county: Somerset
- Region: South West
- Country: England
- Sovereign state: United Kingdom
- Post town: TAUNTON
- Postcode district: TA4
- Dialling code: 01823
- Police: Avon and Somerset
- Fire: Devon and Somerset
- Ambulance: South Western
- UK Parliament: Tiverton and Minehead

Oake is a village and civil parish in Somerset, England, situated 5 miles (8.0 km) west of Taunton. The village has a population of 765.

The parish includes the hamlet of Hillfarrance on Hillfarrance Brook a tributary of the River Tone, and the villages of Hillcommon and Heathfield.

The Sustrans cycle route 3 from Bristol to Padstow passes through the village, as does the route of the Grand Western Canal.

== History ==
The village was named Acon in 897 based on the early presence of Oak trees. From Saxon times it formed part of the manor of Taunton Deane which belonged to the Bishop of Winchester.

The parishes of Heathfield and Hillfarrance were part of the Taunton Deane Hundred.

== Governance ==
The parish council has responsibility for local issues, including setting an annual precept (local rate) to cover the council’s operating costs and producing annual accounts for public scrutiny. The parish council evaluates local planning applications and works with the local police, district council officers, and neighbourhood watch groups on matters of crime, security, and traffic. The parish council's role also includes initiating projects for the maintenance and repair of parish facilities, as well as consulting with the district council on the maintenance, repair, and improvement of highways, drainage, footpaths, public transport, and street cleaning. Conservation matters (including trees and listed buildings) and environmental issues are also the responsibility of the council.

For local government purposes, since 1 April 2023, the village comes under the unitary authority of Somerset Council. Prior to this, it was part of the non-metropolitan district of Somerset West and Taunton (formed on 1 April 2019) and, before this, the district of Taunton Deane (established under the Local Government Act 1972). From 1894-1974, for local government purposes, Oake was part of Wellington Rural District.

It is also part of the Tiverton and Minehead county constituency represented in the House of Commons of the Parliament of the United Kingdom. It elects one Member of Parliament (MP) by the first past the post system of election.

== Geography ==
Between Oake and Bradford-on-Tone is Lang's Farm, a biological Site of Special Scientific Interest which provides an example of unimproved, herb-rich neutral grassland of a type now rare in Britain.

== Religious sites ==
The Church of the Holy Cross in Hillfarrance dates from the 14th century, with the tower being added in 1540, and has been designated by English Heritage as a Grade II* listed building.

In Oake village the Church of St Bartholomew dates from the 13th century, whereas the Church of St John the Baptist in Heathfield retains its 13th-century tower but the rest of the church was largely rebuilt in 1841.

Hillcommon had a Methodist chapel which was built in 1846 but fell into disuse. It has now been converted into residential accommodation.
