= Bishops Lydeard =

Village and civil parish in Somerset, England

Coordinates: 51.06150°N 3.18720°W

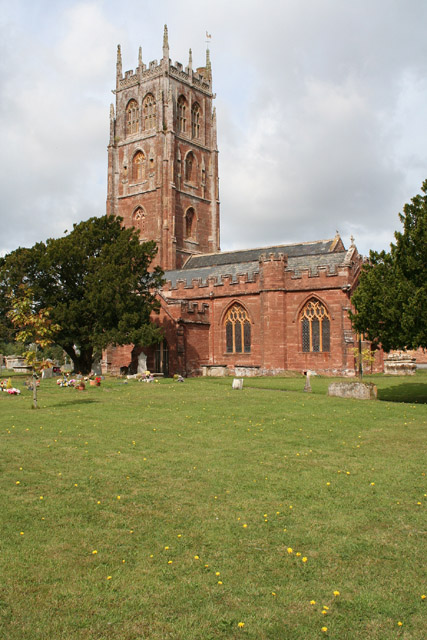
- St Mary's Church

- Location within Somerset
- Population: 2,839 civil parish (2011)
- OS grid reference: ST169298
- Civil parish: Bishop's Lydeard
- Unitary authority: Somerset Council
- Ceremonial county: Somerset
- Region: South West
- Country: England
- Sovereign state: United Kingdom
- Post town: Taunton
- Postcode district: TA4
- Dialling code: 01823
- Police: Avon and Somerset
- Fire: Devon and Somerset
- Ambulance: South Western
- UK Parliament: Tiverton and Minehead

Bishops Lydeard (/ˈlɪdiərd/) is a village and civil parish located in Somerset, England, 5 miles (8 km) north-west of Taunton. The civil parish encompasses the hamlets of East Lydeard and Terhill, and had a population of 2,839 persons as recorded in the 2011 census; this figure, however, includes the village (and now separate parish) of Cotford St Luke.

The village has been bypassed, since 1967, by the A358 road; the West Somerset Railway also runs through the area. The hamlet of East Lydeard is less than a mile to the east of the village; Terhill is about two miles north, while west of the village is Sandhill Park, an eighteenth-century country house.

== History ==
The name of the village probably relates to Gisa, Bishop of Wells, who was its principal tenant and one of the major episcopal landowners in Somerset at the time of the Domesday Book in 1086. Lydeard is a compound of two Saxon personal names: Lide (cognate with "Lloyd"), a derivative of the Brythonic word meaning grey (llwyd in modern Welsh), and Geard, the latter remaining as a local name, "Yarde". As well as being a personal name, geard means "a fence, enclosure, courtyard or dwelling", again of Brythonic origin, as in the modern Welsh word, garth (enclosure, ridge etc.), or personal names, Garth or Gareth. Thus "grey enclosure" or "ridge" seem to be plausible alternative meanings.

The parish of Bishops Lydeard was part of the Kingsbury Hundred.

Cotford St Luke is a large new village, built in the southern part of Bishops Lydeard parish (2 km or over 1 mile south of Bishops Lydeard), which became a separate civil parish in 2011, splitting off from Bishops Lydeard.

== Governance ==
The parish council has responsibility for local issues, including setting an annual precept (local rate) to cover the council's operating costs and producing annual accounts for public scrutiny. The parish council evaluates local planning applications and works with the local police, district council officers, and neighbourhood watch groups on matters of crime, security, and traffic. The parish council's role also includes initiating projects for the maintenance and repair of parish facilities, as well as consulting with the district council on the maintenance, repair, and improvement of highways, drainage, footpaths, public transport, and street cleaning. Conservation matters (including trees and listed buildings) and some environmental issues are also the responsibility of the council.

For local government purposes, since 1 April 2023, the village comes under the unitary authority of Somerset Council. Prior to this, it was part of the non-metropolitan district of Somerset West and Taunton (formed on 1 April 2019) and, before this, the district of Taunton Deane (established under the Local Government Act 1972). From 1894-1974, it was part of Taunton Rural District.

There is an electoral ward with the same name as the parish. It also extends to Halse and northwards to West Bagborough. The ward had a population of 6,323 as at the 2011 Census.

It is also part of the Tiverton and Minehead county constituency represented in the House of Commons of the Parliament. It elects one Member of Parliament (MP) by the first past the post system of election, and was part of the South West England constituency of the European Parliament prior to Britain leaving the European Union in January 2020.

== Landmarks ==
Lydeard House was built in the mid 18th century. It is a Grade II* listed building.

=== Watermill ===
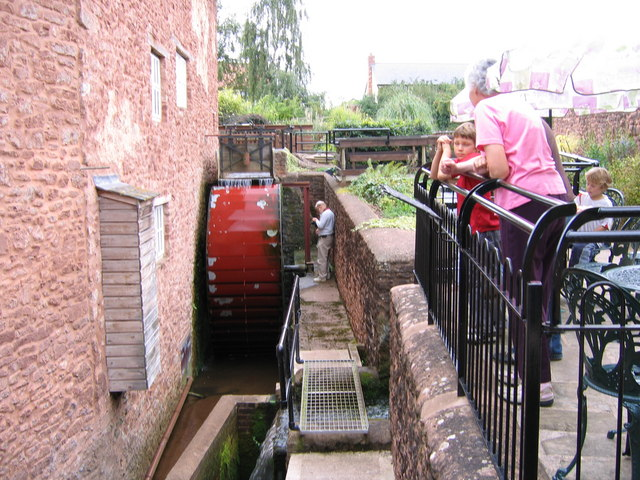
Bishops Lydeard Mill and Rural Life Museum

There were originally two flour mills in Bishops Lydeard. Higher Mill has been demolished. The Bishops Lydeard Mill and Rural Life Museum is housed in a building which dates from the 18th century, and was extended in the early 19th century with the addition of a millhouse. It has an overshot waterwheel and has been designated as a Grade II listed building. Since 2000 the building has been renovated with the renovations opened by the town Mayor in 2003. The water wheel weighs over two tonnes and is driven by water from Back Stream which originates in the Brendon Hills. The museum focuses on traditional trades and crafts including a wheelwright's shop, cooper's shop, saddler's shop, blacksmith's shop and a Victorian kitchen.

=== Sandhill Park ===
Sandhill Park was built as a country house around 1720. It was built by John Periam, the Member of Parliament for Minehead, as Hill House and lived in by the Lethbridge family from 1767 to 1913. During World War I it was used as a prisoner of war camp for German and Austro-Hungarian officers. In 1919 it was converted by Somerset County Council into a home for handicapped children. It was requisitioned by the military in August 1940 and became the 41st General Military Hospital, providing accommodation in tents and huts. From 1941 the hospital was leased to the American Army as a neurological hospital for over 1,000 patients in 32 new wards, which were completed in 1942. The hospital remained in military use until 1944. The psychiatric hospital reopened under the National Health Service in 1948 and further buildings were constructed. The hospital was sold in 1991 and housing built on part of the site.

The buildings of Sandhill Park were badly damaged in a fire on 22 November 2011, the east wing being gutted and extensive damage caused to the main house. The west wing and orangery survived.

== Religious sites ==
The church of St Mary dates from the 14th and 15th centuries and in 1860–62 was extended by one bay and a vestry by Edward Jeboult of Taunton. It is a Grade I listed building. The tower has pierced tracery battlements, pinnacles, set back buttresses terminating in pinnacles at the bell-storey, and pinnacles on the buttresses at each stage. Several of the tombs in the churchyard are of historical importance, as are two crosses, one dating from the 14th century, the other being the town's market cross which was moved to the churchyard in the 19th century.

== Transport ==
=== West Somerset Railway ===
Bishops Lydeard railway station is a notable station on the heritage West Somerset Railway, as the southern terminus of passenger services.

=== Bus services ===
The village is served by scheduled bus services provided by First Group on the Taunton–Minehead route. These run approximately every 40 minutes during the daytime Monday to Saturday in both directions, and generally every 90 minutes on Sundays. Since January 2023, an evening bus service has been reintroduced.

Other destinations, including Bridgwater and Kingston St Mary, are also served, but less frequently.

== People connected with Bishops Lydeard ==
- John Flavel, (1596-1617) logician, born in Bishops Lydeard
- Margaretta Graddon (born 1803), singer, born in Bishops Lydeard
- Henry H. Slater (1851-1934) parson-naturalist, died in Bishops Lydeard
- Dr Harry Roberts (1871-1946) doctor, author and philanthropist, born in Bishops Lydeard
- Nicolas Tindal-Carill-Worsley (1911-2006) bomber pilot in WWII, died in Bishops Lydeard
