= Grade II* listed buildings in Taunton Deane =

Taunton Deane shown within the county of Somerset

Taunton Deane is a former local government district with borough status in the English county of Somerset. In the United Kingdom, the term listed building refers to a building or other structure officially designated as being of special architectural, historical or cultural significance; Grade II* structures are those considered to be "particularly significant buildings of more than local interest". Listing was begun by a provision in the Town and Country Planning Act 1947. Once listed, severe restrictions are imposed on the modifications allowed to a building's structure or its fittings. In England, the authority for listing under the Planning (Listed Buildings and Conservation Areas) Act 1990 rests with Historic England, a non-departmental public body sponsored by the Department for Digital, Culture, Media and Sport; local authorities have a responsibility to regulate and enforce the planning regulations.

Taunton Deane has an area of 462 square kilometres (178 square miles), and a population as of 2016 of 115,500. It is centred on the town of Taunton, where around 60,000 of the population live and the council are based, and includes surrounding suburbs and villages.

There are 118 Grade II* listed buildings in Taunton Deane. The oldest is St George's Church, Fons George which has Saxon origins. There are also Norman and medieval churches and churchyard crosses. More recent buildings include country houses and barns along with municipal buildings and an almshouse. The list also includes urban properties such as those in Hammet Street and The Crescent in Taunton. Industrial sites are represented by Tonedale Mills in Wellington, the largest woollen mill in South West England.

== Buildings ==
Name	Location	Type	Completed (Note: The date given is the date used by Historic England as significant for the initial building or that of an important part in the structure's description.)	Grid ref. (Note: Sometimes known as OSGB36, the grid reference is based on the British national grid reference system used by the Ordnance Survey.) Geo-coordinates	Entry number (Note: The "List Entry Number" is a unique number assigned to each listed building and scheduled monument by Historic England.)	Image	Ref.
1–6, Cheapside	Taunton	Shop	Early 19th century	ST228244; 51°00′51″N 3°06′05″W	1060078	1–6, Cheapside More images	
1–11, The Crescent	Taunton	Terrace	1807	ST225243; 51°00′47″N 3°06′20″W	1344699	1–11, The Crescent More images	
4, 5–8, Hammet Street	Taunton	Terrace	1788–90	ST228245; 51°00′55″N 3°06′06″W	1276877	4, 5–8, Hammet Street More images	
5 and 7, The Square	Wiveliscombe	House	1881	ST081278; 51°02′33″N 3°18′44″W	1307465	5 and 7, The Square More images	
9–12, Hammet Street	Taunton	Terrace	1788–90	ST228245; 51°00′55″N 3°06′06″W	1060037	9–12, Hammet Street	
12, Middle Street	Taunton	House	c. 1700	ST228247; 51°01′00″N 3°06′05″W	1344725	12, Middle Street	
13–17, Hammet Street	Taunton	Terrace	1788–90	ST227245; 51°00′54″N 3°06′08″W	1344735	13–17, Hammet Street	
15, 16–20, The Crescent	Taunton	Terrace	1807	ST225242; 51°00′45″N 3°06′19″W	1060043	15, 16–20, The Crescent	
16–20, Park Street	Taunton	Terrace	Mid Victorian	ST222243; 51°00′49″N 3°06′37″W	1059993	16–20, Park Street	
No 18, Fore Street	Taunton	House	16th or early 17th century	ST226244; 51°00′51″N 3°06′13″W	1232670	No 18, Fore Street More images	
24–28, Silver Street	Taunton	House	Probably very early 19th century	ST231244; 51°00′50″N 3°05′50″W	1276486	24–28, Silver Street	
48, East Street	Taunton	House	Mid 18th century	ST230245; 51°00′53″N 3°05′54″W	1060057	48, East Street More images	
115 and 117, Galmington Road, 2, Galmington Lane	Taunton	Cross passage house	Medieval	ST212238; 51°00′31″N 3°07′27″W	1276934	115 and 117, Galmington Road, 2, Galmington Lane	
Almshouses	Staple Fitzpaine	Flats	1643	ST264182; 50°57′33″N 3°02′57″W	1060273	Upload Photo	
Bagborough House	West Bagborough	Country house	c. 1730	ST168337; 51°05′48″N 3°11′18″W	1060526	Bagborough House More images	
Blagrove's Farmhouse (and adjoining walls to the north west and south west)	Oake	Farmhouse	Late 17th century	ST145256; 51°01′26″N 3°13′12″W	1344563	Blagrove's Farmhouse (and adjoining walls to the north west and south west) More images	
Bradford Bridge	Bradford-on-Tone	Road bridge	15th century	ST171229; 51°00′01″N 3°10′53″W	1060375	Bradford Bridge More images	
Buckland Farmhouse	West Buckland	Farmhouse	Late 16th century	ST181193; 50°58′05″N 3°10′00″W	1180164	Upload Photo	
Bulford House	Wellington	House	18th century	ST141203; 50°58′33″N 3°13′29″W	1059874	Upload Photo	
Chilliswood Farmhouse (with horse-engine house and barn)	Trull	House	Medieval	ST198220; 50°59′31″N 3°08′34″W	1060445	Chilliswood Farmhouse (with horse-engine house and barn)	
Church of All Saints	Chipstable	Parish church	15th century	ST042271; 51°02′08″N 3°22′00″W	1344603	Church of All Saints More images	
Church of All Saints	Norton Fitzwarren	Parish church	Late 13th or early 14th century	ST196259; 51°01′39″N 3°08′48″W	1060468	Church of All Saints More images	
Church of St Andrew	Wiveliscombe	Church	1827–29	ST082276; 51°02′28″N 3°18′35″W	1177072	Church of St Andrew More images	
Church of St Bartholomew	Oake	Parish church	13th–14th century	ST152251; 51°01′11″N 3°12′35″W	1307395	Church of St Bartholomew More images	
Church of St George	Taunton	Church	Saxon	ST224239; 51°00′33″N 3°06′23″W	1060018	Church of St George More images	
Church of St Giles	Bradford-on-Tone	Parish church	c. 1300	ST173229; 51°00′01″N 3°10′48″W	1060376	Church of St Giles More images	
Church of St James	Taunton	Church	Medieval	ST228248; 51°01′04″N 3°06′04″W	1059956	Church of St James More images	
Church of St James the Great	Fitzhead	Church	15th century	ST119283; 51°02′53″N 3°15′26″W	1175726	Church of St James the Great More images	
Church of St John the Baptist	Ashbrittle	Church	15th century	ST052213; 50°59′02″N 3°21′07″W	1059880	Church of St John the Baptist More images	
Church of St Leonard	Otterford	Parish church	14th century	ST222143; 50°55′23″N 3°06′28″W	1344635	Church of St Leonard More images	
Church of St Margaret	Thorne St Margaret	Parish church	15th century	ST098210; 50°58′56″N 3°17′07″W	1180128	Church of St Margaret More images	
Church of St Mary	Cheddon Fitzpaine	Parish church	Late 13th century	ST242275; 51°02′34″N 3°04′53″W	1060508	Church of St Mary More images	
Church of St Mary	Stoke St Mary	Parish church	13th century	ST265223; 50°59′45″N 3°02′51″W	1177216	Church of St Mary More images	
Church of St Michael	Orchard Portman	Parish church	Norman	ST243216; 50°59′21″N 3°04′44″W	1060391	Church of St Michael More images	
Church of St Michael	Angersleigh	Parish church	14th century	ST199187; 50°57′44″N 3°08′31″W	1177574	Church of St Michael More images	
Church of St Nicholas	Corfe	Parish church	Norman	ST232196; 50°58′17″N 3°05′40″W	1060345	Church of St Nicholas More images	
Church of St Nicholas	Kittisford	Church	c. 1500	ST078223; 50°59′34″N 3°18′53″W	1176263	Church of St Nicholas More images	
Church of St Pancras	West Bagborough	Church	1643	ST168337; 51°05′48″N 3°11′20″W	1344480	Church of St Pancras More images	
Church of St Peter	Runnington, Langford Budville	Parish church	15th century	ST118218; 50°59′22″N 3°15′24″W	1060352	Church of St Peter More images	
Church of St Peter and St Paul	Bishop's Hull	Church	13th century	ST204247; 51°01′00″N 3°08′06″W	1060537	Church of St Peter and St Paul More images	
Church of the Holy Cross	Hillfarrance, Oake	Parish church	14th century	ST167246; 51°00′54″N 3°11′18″W	1060326	Church of the Holy Cross More images	
Church of the Holy Trinity	Ash Priors	Church	15th century	ST151294; 51°03′30″N 3°12′42″W	1344823	Church of the Holy Trinity More images	
Churchyard cross, Church of St Andrew	Wiveliscombe	Cross	14th century	ST082276; 51°02′28″N 3°18′34″W	1177103	Churchyard cross, Church of St Andrew	
Churchyard cross, Church of St James the Great	Fitzhead	Sculpture	14th century	ST119283; 51°02′52″N 3°15′26″W	1059198	Churchyard cross, Church of St James the Great More images	
Churchyard cross, Church of St John the Baptist	Heathfield	Cross	Late 13th century	ST160264; 51°01′53″N 3°11′57″W	1307462	Churchyard cross, Church of St John the Baptist More images	
Churchyard cross, Church of St Mary	Bishops Lydeard	Steps	14th century	ST167297; 51°03′39″N 3°11′21″W	1175069	Churchyard cross, Church of St Mary More images	
Churchyard cross, Church of St Peter and St Paul	Combe Florey	Cross	15th century	ST150311; 51°04′24″N 3°12′49″W	1059225	Churchyard cross, Church of St Peter and St Paul	
Churchyard cross, Church of St Peter and St Paul	North Curry	Cross	15th century	ST319254; 51°01′29″N 2°58′18″W	1060411	Upload Photo	
Cloth Finishing Works at Tone Mills (North range including dye-house and reservoirs)	Wellington	Reservoir	c. 1830	ST127212; 50°59′02″N 3°14′38″W	1271246	Cloth Finishing Works at Tone Mills (North range including dye-house and reservoirs) More images	
Coalharbour	Creech St Michael	House	16th century	ST288253; 51°01′22″N 3°00′55″W	1344519	Upload Photo	
Conservative Club	Taunton	House	1805	ST228246; 51°00′57″N 3°06′05″W	1231461	Conservative Club More images	
Cothelstone Manor	Cothelstone	Manor house	Mid 16th century	ST181318; 51°04′47″N 3°10′12″W	1344838	Cothelstone Manor More images	
County Hotel	Taunton	House	Early 19th century	ST228244; 51°00′51″N 3°06′03″W	1060016	County Hotel More images	
Fairhouse Farmhouse	Churchstanton	Farmhouse	Late Medieval	ST219123; 50°54′18″N 3°06′43″W	1177497	Upload Photo	
Fitzhead Court and The Manor	Fitzhead	House	Late 16th century	ST121284; 51°02′56″N 3°15′14″W	1059202	Fitzhead Court and The Manor More images	
Garden House	Pitminster	Garden house	17th century	ST222202; 50°58′33″N 3°06′34″W	1344593	Upload Photo	
Gatehouse, Cothay Manor (and wall linking gatehouse to manor)	Stawley	Gatehouse	Late 15th century	ST085212; 50°59′02″N 3°18′16″W	1344803	Gatehouse, Cothay Manor (and wall linking gatehouse to manor) More images	
Gatehouse, Combe Florey House	Combe Florey	Gatehouse	1591	ST151311; 51°04′24″N 3°12′47″W	1059226	Gatehouse, Combe Florey House More images	
Gaulden Manor	Tolland	House	16th century	ST110313; 51°04′29″N 3°16′14″W	1307623	Upload Photo	
Gazebo, Cothelstone Manor (and adjoining walls)	Cothelstone	Wall	Late 16th century	ST182318; 51°04′48″N 3°10′08″W	1059193	Upload Photo	
Gerbestone Manor	West Buckland	Cross passage house	Late 16th century	ST161193; 50°58′04″N 3°11′42″W	1344582	Gerbestone Manor More images	
Giffords Farmhouse and Barn	Norton Fitzwarren	Farmhouse	16th century	ST199270; 51°02′12″N 3°08′34″W	1060466	Upload Photo	
Hamwood Farmhouse (and walls with gate-piers and gate)	Trull	Farmhouse	17th century	ST197211; 50°59′01″N 3°08′43″W	1344504	Upload Photo	
Henlade House	Ruishton	Country house	1805–15	ST272230; 51°00′08″N 3°02′15″W	1060397	Henlade House More images	
Hestercombe House	Cheddon Fitzpaine	Country house	16th century	ST241287; 51°03′10″N 3°05′01″W	1060513	Hestercombe House More images	
Hill Farmhouse	Stawley	Farmhouse	Late 16th century	ST061218; 50°59′18″N 3°20′18″W	1176991	Hill Farmhouse More images	
Homedale	Milverton	House	16th–17th century	ST121258; 51°01′31″N 3°15′13″W	1060553	Upload Photo	
Kittisford Barton	Stawley	House	Late 15th century	ST076231; 51°00′03″N 3°19′01″W	1307955	Kittisford Barton More images	
Langford Court	Langford Budville	House	17th century	ST108230; 50°59′59″N 3°16′16″W	1060351	Upload Photo	
Little Court	West Bagborough	House	Late 20th century	ST167334; 51°05′41″N 3°11′26″W	1176957	Upload Photo	
Lodge Farmhouse	Durston	Farmhouse	15th century	ST290281; 51°02′55″N 3°00′46″W	1060491	Upload Photo	
Lower Stoford Farmhouse (and wall, gate-piers)	Halse	Farmhouse	Late 15th or early 16th century	ST144287; 51°03′07″N 3°13′18″W	1308046	Lower Stoford Farmhouse (and wall, gate-piers) More images	
Lower Terhill Farmhouse	Bishops Lydeard	Farmhouse	16th century	ST176326; 51°05′15″N 3°10′35″W	1344853	Lower Terhill Farmhouse More images	
Lydeard House (and attached stables and walls)	Bishops Lydeard	Country house	Early–mid 18th century	ST166298; 51°03′44″N 3°11′25″W	1295371	Lydeard House (and attached stables and walls) More images	
Manor Farmhouse	Stoke Road, North Curry	Farmhouse	1570	ST322252; 51°01′21″N 2°58′04″W	1176349	Upload Photo	
Manor Farmhouse	Knapp, North Curry	Farmhouse	Late Medieval	ST305255; 51°01′31″N 2°59′32″W	1176652	Upload Photo	
Manor House	Bishop's Hull	Manor house	1586	ST205248; 51°01′02″N 3°08′02″W	1060535	Manor House More images	
Market House	Taunton	House	1770–72	ST227244; 51°00′53″N 3°06′10″W	1059989	Market House More images	
Masonic Hall	Taunton	Steps	1812	ST225242; 51°00′45″N 3°06′18″W	1060044	Masonic Hall More images	
Mausoleum, Hestercombe House	West Monkton	Folly	Late 18th century	ST243289; 51°03′16″N 3°04′51″W	1060461	Mausoleum, Hestercombe House More images	
Municipal Buildings (incorporating the Old Grammar School)	Taunton	Local government office	c. 1480	ST226245; 51°00′54″N 3°06′16″W	1060041	Municipal Buildings (incorporating the Old Grammar School) More images	
Musgrave Farmhouse	Ruishton	Farmhouse	Mid 19th century	ST269235; 51°00′25″N 3°02′35″W	1177045	Upload Photo	
Netherfield	Milverton	House	c. 1766	ST119256; 51°01′25″N 3°15′23″W	1176748	Netherfield More images	
North Lodge	Bishops Lydeard		Early 18th century	ST155303; 51°03′58″N 3°12′23″W	1059222	Upload Photo	
Nynehead Court (and adjoining wall)	Nynehead	Kitchen	Late Medieval	ST137227; 50°59′51″N 3°13′51″W	1307540	Nynehead Court (and adjoining wall) More images	
Old Court	Wellington	House	16th century	ST137204; 50°58′38″N 3°13′49″W	1059899	Upload Photo	
Outbuilding with wall, Haydon House	Stoke St Mary	Wash house	Late 17th century	ST255235; 51°00′24″N 3°03′45″W	1177118	Upload Photo	
Poundisford Lodge	Pitminster	Country house	17th century	ST222207; 50°58′52″N 3°06′32″W	1344592	Poundisford Lodge More images	
Priory Barn	Taunton	Augustinian monastery	1220	ST230249; 51°01′08″N 3°05′56″W	1344774	Priory Barn More images	
Pyleigh Manor	Lydeard St Lawrence	Farmhouse	16th century	ST128308; 51°04′14″N 3°14′45″W	1344481	Upload Photo	
Pyrland Hall	Cheddon Fitzpaine	Country house	c. 1760	ST227276; 51°02′34″N 3°06′13″W	1176079	Upload Photo	
Queens College	Comeytrowe	Further education college	1874	ST217231; 51°00′08″N 3°07′02″W	1276273	Queens College More images	
Remains of Churchyard cross, Church of St George	Ruishton	Cross	Early 15th century	ST263250; 51°01′14″N 3°03′04″W	1060396	Upload Photo	
Remains of Churchyard cross, Church of All Saints	Nynehead	Cross	15th century	ST137227; 50°59′51″N 3°13′48″W	1344597	Upload Photo	
Risdons	Bradford-on-Tone	Farmhouse	16th century	ST173226; 50°59′50″N 3°10′47″W	1060337	Upload Photo	
Roman Catholic Church of St George	Taunton	Church	1861	ST230242; 51°00′46″N 3°05′55″W	1231201	Roman Catholic Church of St George More images	
Sandhill Park Hospital	Bishops Lydeard	Country house	c. 1720	ST156298; 51°03′43″N 3°12′19″W	1295317	Sandhill Park Hospital More images	
Sherford House	Taunton	House	1679	ST226233; 51°00′14″N 3°06′13″W	1233681	Upload Photo	
Slough Farmhouse	Stoke St Gregory	Double ended hall house	Late Medieval	ST347277; 51°02′42″N 2°55′54″W	1344637	Upload Photo	
St Joseph's Convent	Taunton	House	Early 19th century	ST232241; 51°00′41″N 3°05′44″W	1276422	St Joseph's Convent More images	
St Margaret's Leper Hospital	Taunton	Almshouse	Early 16th century	ST238248; 51°01′03″N 3°05′14″W	1232831	St Margaret's Leper Hospital More images	
Summerhouse at Language Centre	Taunton	Summerhouse	Late 19th century	ST221251; 51°01′12″N 3°06′41″W	1059936	Summerhouse at Language Centre	
Tetton House (and terrace to garden)	Kingston St Mary	Country house	c. 1790	ST207304; 51°04′04″N 3°07′54″W	1307958	Tetton House (and terrace to garden) More images	
Temple, Hestercombe House	West Monkton	Garden temple	Late 18th century	ST243289; 51°03′17″N 3°04′52″W	1390976	Temple, Hestercombe House More images	
The Manor House	Kingston St Mary	Cross passage house	c. 1560	ST220297; 51°03′42″N 3°06′47″W	1060501	Upload Photo	
The Old House	Milverton	House	Late 15th or early 16th century	ST122258; 51°01′32″N 3°15′10″W	1060552	Upload Photo	
The Old Manor House	Combe Florey	House	17th century	ST153312; 51°04′27″N 3°12′35″W	1059230	Upload Photo	
Tonedale Mills (East complex)	Wellington	Carpenters' workshop	Late 19th century	ST128213; 50°59′05″N 3°14′36″W	1176514	Upload Photo	
Tonedale Mills (West complex)	Wellington	Industrial estate	Late 20th century	ST127213; 50°59′04″N 3°14′42″W	1051987	Tonedale Mills (West complex) More images	
Trowell Farmhouse	Chipstable	Farmhouse	17th century	ST048260; 51°01′33″N 3°21′30″W	1177577	Upload Photo	
Unidentified chest tomb in Churchyard, Church of St Augustine	West Monkton	Chest Tomb	Late 17th century	ST263284; 51°03′02″N 3°03′10″W	1307458	Upload Photo	
Unitarian chapel	Taunton	Unitarian Chapel	1721	ST227242; 51°00′44″N 3°06′08″W	1060009	Unitarian chapel More images	
Walford House	West Monkton	House	Late 18th century	ST272282; 51°02′55″N 3°02′24″W	1060421	Walford House More images	
Washer's Farmhouse	Fitzhead	Farmhouse	Early 17th century	ST115286; 51°03′01″N 3°15′48″W	1059205	Upload Photo	
Wellington Monument	Wellington Without	Obelisk	1817–18	ST137172; 50°56′53″N 3°13′45″W	1060281	Wellington Monument More images	
Wheatleigh House	Taunton	House	Early to mid 19th century	ST220237; 51°00′29″N 3°06′43″W	1039998	Wheatleigh House More images	
Yarde Farmhouse	Staplegrove	Farmhouse	Early 17th century	ST201273; 51°02′25″N 3°08′25″W	1344515	Upload Photo	

== See also ==
- Grade II* listed buildings in Somerset
- Grade I listed buildings in Taunton Deane
