= Mary Whitwell Hale =

19th-century American teacher, school founder, hymnwriter

- Born: January 29, 1810; Boston, Massachusetts, U.S.
- Died: November 17, 1862 (aged 52); Keene, New Hampshire, U.S.
- Resting place: Mount Auburn Cemetery
- Occupations: teacher, school founder, hymnwriter
- Writing career
- Pen name: Y. L. E.
- Language: English
- Period: Romantic era

Mary Whitwell Hale (pen name, Y. L. E.; January 29, 1810 – November 17, 1862) was an American teacher, school founder, and hymnwriter of the Romantic era. She was a contributor to The Christian Register. Her pen name was made up of the concluding letters of her first, middle, and surname.

== Early life and education ==
Mary Whitwell Hale was born at Boston, Massachusetts, January 29, 1810. Her father was Eliphalet Hale (1775–1852) of Boston, a merchant of that city. Her mother was Abigail (1775–1829), daughter of Colonel Jonathan Waters, himself an old Bostonian. There was one sibling, a sister, Elizabeth Judith Hale (1821–1912). At the time of her birth, the parents resided in Hollis Street, and were parishioners of Dr. John Thornton Kirkland at New South Church; he baptized her, and she afterwards commemorated him in verse.

She attended the public schools, and was apt, quick, and faithful in her studies. In 1822, the family removed to Jamaica Plain, and in 1824, returned to Boston, where, at the Franklin Grammar School, she graduated in 1825. For the next three years she was connected, as a pupil, with a Young Ladies' Academy, in Phillips Place, maintaining a very high rank during the entire course, and winning at the close a first prize for English composition, and most flattering encomiums from her instructor, Ebenezer Bailey.

== Career ==
After completing her education, she devoted herself to educational work in Boston and Taunton. While yet a young lady, she contributed to the Boston Evening Gazette a variety of prose sketches, which were oftentimes widely copied and heartily commended.

Hale was a member of the Christian Church under the guidance of her pastor at Taunton, Rev. Andrew Bigelow, D.D., who was her friend. She was a teacher in his Sunday school, a helper in the interests of his society, as well as a visitor to his family.

She then went to visit her friends in Keene, New Hampshire. Here, she attended Rev. William Orne White's church, and she consented to fill a vacancy as a teacher in one of the town schools. Though she was a good teacher, she continued in the position for only one year due to the sickness and death of her mother. Soon after this, she assisted Mr. E. Bailey for a year in his work at the Phillips Place Academy, before sickness brought her close to death. At this time, she wrote a very solemn vow of consecration to the will and service of God, and was faithful to it through all her subsequent life.

On her recovery, she returned to her labors at Phillips Place, then taught at Wellfleet on Cape Cod, and after spending a short time at Newton, went to Taunton, where she assumed, in December 1833, the duties of preceptress in the Bristol Academy. Here, she had great success in her profession, and gained a host of friends among all circles and sects. Owing to certain unjust treatment which she received from the principal of the institution, she surrendered her position and opened a private school in the same town.

Her hymn-writing was brought into notice by two hymns, one on "Home", and the second on "Music", which were written for a juvenile concert at the Taunton Unitarian Chapel, April 1834. Several of the hymns and poetical pieces which she subsequently wrote were contributed to The Christian Register under the initials "Y. L. E.", the concluding letters of her name.

In 1840, a volume of her Poems was published in Boston by William Ticknor. These productions are nearly all of a religious character, being penetrated and sanctified by that deep spirit of faith, trust, and love which so greatly distinguished her. They all together evidence a mind of uncommon natural endowments and of fine and thorough culture, as well as a heart consecrated to the highest ends of life and enriched by the best fruits of the Christian experience. The few of her sacred songs which have passed into hymn-books were first introduced into the Cheshire Collection, 1844. Numbers 2 and 3 were taken from her Poems.

1. "Praise for the glorious light." (Temperance Anniversary.)
2. "This day let grateful praise ascend." (Sunday.)
3. "Whatever dims the sense of truth." (A Mother's Counsel.)
4. "When in silence o'er the deep." (Christmas.)

Leaving Taunton in 1842, she once more went to Keene, where she established and for many years taught another school, which under her care enjoyed a high and enviable reputation. Here, her father died, September 26, 1852.

== Death ==
When the Civil War broke out in 1861, she served as secretary of the Cheshire County Soldier's Aid Society, and wrote inspiring hymns and odes. She died in Keene, November 17, 1862, and was buried at Mount Auburn Cemetery.

== Selected works ==
=== As Mary W. Hale ===
- Poems, 1840
