= The Crescent, Taunton =

Street in Taunton, United Kingdom

The Crescent
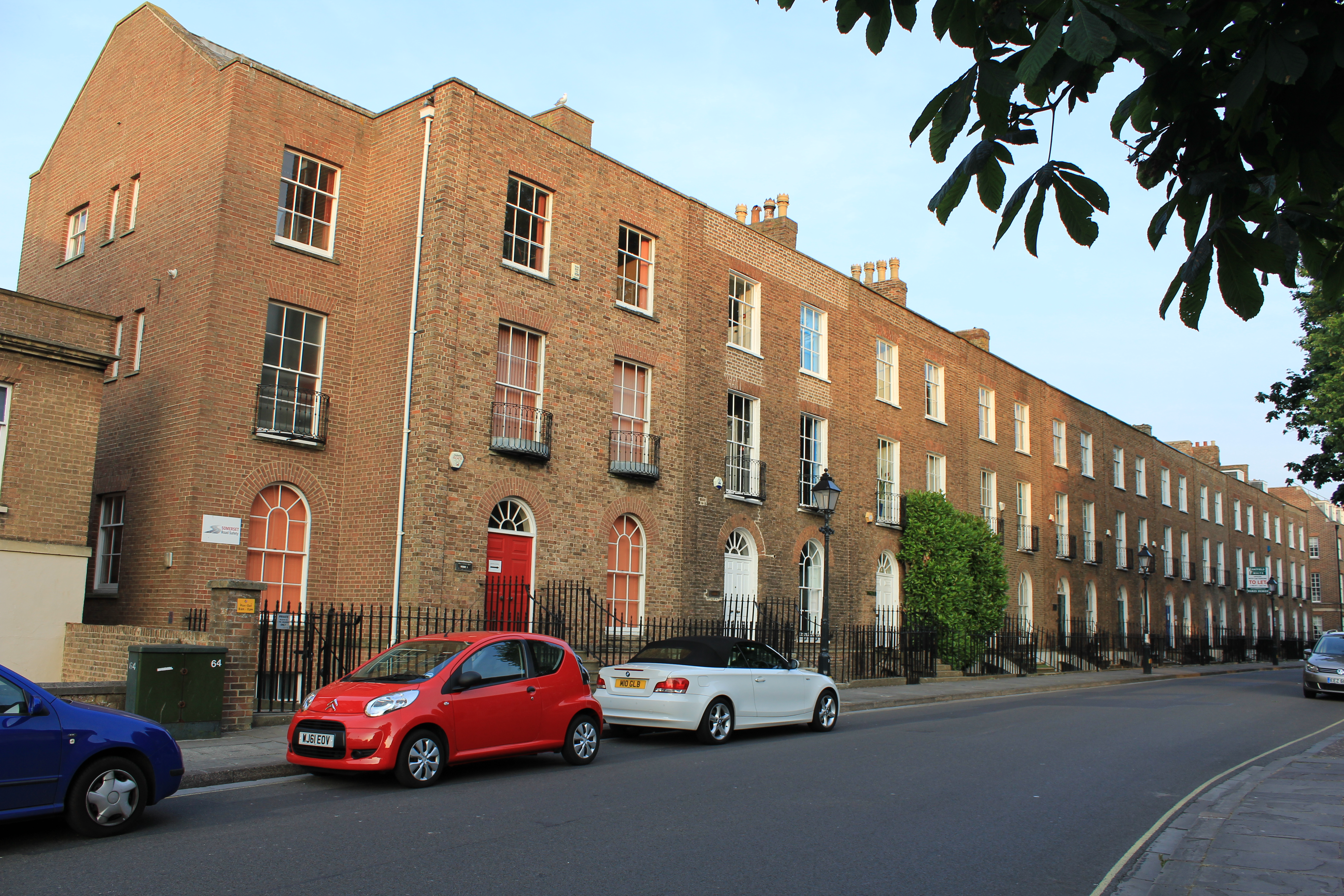
- The Crescent, looking South
- Interactive map of The Crescent
- Location: Taunton, Somerset
- Postal code: TA1 4
- Coordinates: 51.0128°N 3.1057°W
- North end: Park Street, Tower Street
- South end: Upper High Street

Construction
- Construction start: 1807

The Crescent is a street in Taunton, a town in the English county of Somerset. Construction began in 1807, during a period of extensive redevelopment in the town, driven by the Market House Society and the Member of Parliament Sir Benjamin Hammet. Lined on the eastern side by a Georgian terrace, the street follows a shallow crescent shape, broken in the middle by Crescent Way and a bit further south by St George's Place. It links Upper High Street, at its southern end, with Park Street and Tower Street to the north. On the western side, Somerset County Council have their offices in the County Hall, erected in 1935, and extended in the 1960s. The Georgian terrace, the Masonic Hall, and the County Hall are recorded in the National Heritage List for England as listed buildings.

== History ==
During the 17th and 18th centuries Taunton suffered, first due to the Civil War (1642–1651), during which two thirds of the town was burnt down, and then the decline of the cloth industry upon which the town's economy relied. In the late 18th century, the Taunton Market House Society formed with the aim of improving Taunton town centre, most notably the Market House. Benjamin Hammet, a prominent member of the society, was elected as a Member of Parliament for Taunton in 1782, and tried to start clearing the slums in the town centre. In 1770, the old Market House was knocked down and replaced, and less than ten years later, Hammet Street was built, to connect the Market square with the Church of St Mary Magdalene.

The Crescent formed part of Hammet's plan for Taunton. It was built to the north of Upper High Street, in what was known at the time as Paul's Field. It follows a shallow crescent shape, which Nikolaus Pevsner notes is "hardly noticeable". Although Hammet died in 1800, the foundation stone was placed in 1807 by William Kinglake, as part of a ceremony that was attended by "an immense number of persons." The Monthly Magazine noted that the street was intended to add to the "ornament, respectability, and advantage" of Taunton, while the Taunton Courier reported that the houses were intended for "genteel families".

When the street was built, each end featured a cottage with high iron gates which limited traffic to residents and their visitors. The footpaths were less restricted, but featured "three or four posts between which a corpulent person had difficulty in squeezing." These gates and posts have since been removed. The Crescent comprised a terrace of houses along the street's eastern side; the other side was not built on and was eventually converted into parkland. In 1822, a Catholic chapel, known as St George's Chapel was built at the southern-end of the terrace, the first Catholic church built in Taunton since the Reformation. The Catholic congregation moved out to a larger church in 1878 and the chapel was bought by the Freemasons, who converted it into a Masonic Lodge.

In 1935, County Hall was built on the open side of The Crescent, providing Somerset County Council with more space than their previous offices at Shire Hall. Early plans for further buildings at the site did not come to fruition, but County Hall was extended in the 1960s to cover most of the open land in front of The Crescent. Despite the work done by Hammet, the area between The Crescent and the High Street was still considered a slum until it was redeveloped around the Second World War. During this period, the General Post Office (GPO) built "Telephone House", a telephone exchange and office building, replacing the houses in the middle of the terrace.

== Architecture ==
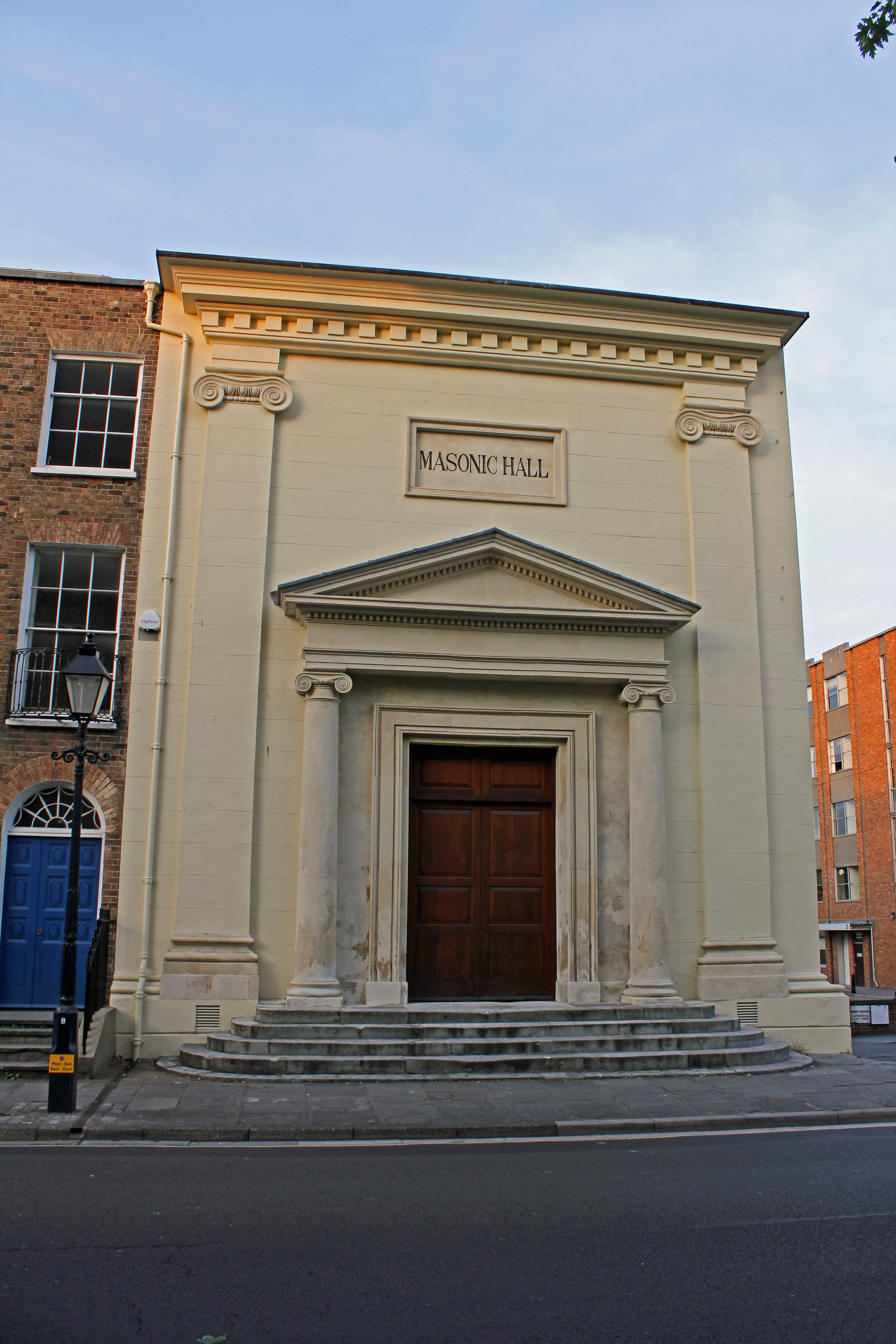
The Masonic Hall, which was originally built as a Catholic chapel

On the eastern side of The Crescent, a Georgian terrace was erected in 1807. Built of "pinkish-brown" brick, each house is of three-storeys plus a basement, and is two windows across. The houses are split by plain pilasters and topped with hipped slate roofs. While the first and second storey windows are rectangular, those on the ground floor are round-headed, as are the doorways. The first floor windows have small, circular segmental balconies. A variety of six- and eight-panel doors are reached by climbing a small flight of steps, and the entire terrace is fronted with railings. This terrace forms two separate listed building designations from Historic England; numbers 1–11 and 15–20, both of which are Grade II* listed.

The terrace is intersected by Crescent Way, which leads to the Crescent car park. On the southern side of Crescent Way, the northern end of the terrace formed by numbers 15–20, is Exchange House, the former GPO Telephone House, which was built in place of original numbers 12–14. According to Pevsner, this building breaks the modesty of the street, with "its thick-set Tuscan porch". At the southern end of the same terrace is the Masonic Hall, another Grade II* listed building, which forms the end of the terrace, and features a series of prominent Ionic pilasters along the front and southern end.

A further terrace to the south of the Masonic Hall is split from the hall by St George's Place. It is formed of numbers 21 to 23 The Crescent, and number 42 Upper High Street. The terrace forms two listed building designations, both Grade II. Numbers 21 and 22 The Crescent are two-storey roughcast houses, each spanning three windows. The doorways are round-headed, and are flanked by ground floor bay windows. Number 23 forms the back of 42 Upper High Street, and is a two-storey red brick building.

On the western side, the first part of the County Hall was built in 1935, and is known as "A Block". It was designed by Vincent Harris, and is Neo-Georgian. It is a three-storey, built out of red and buff-coloured bricks forming an English bond, with Portland stone dressings. The central section is curved, with wings at 45 degrees to the formed main entrance. The ground-floor is fronted with ashlar, and has three round arches, the middle one of which forms a doorway. The doorway is topped by an engraved coat of arms in the tympanum. The central block spans nine windows, while each wing has a prominent window at the end, framed by an aedicule. The first and second floors of the wings feature eleven sash windows. An extension was made to the south of the building in the 1960s. The original "A Block" is designated as a Grade II listed building.

== See also ==
- Grade II* listed buildings in Taunton Deane
