= Masonic Hall, Taunton =

Grade II listed building in Taunton, UK

Masonic Hall
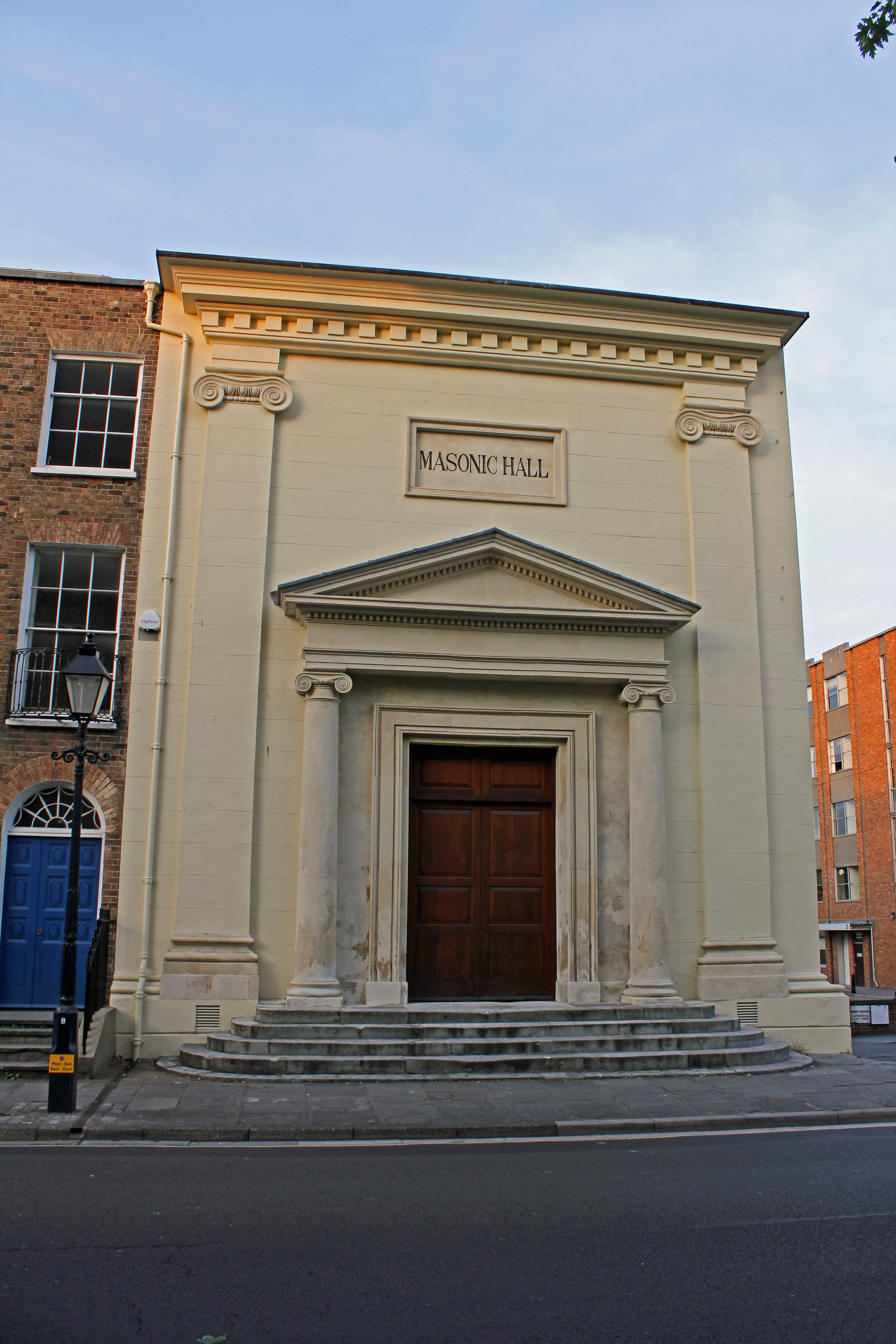
- Pictured in 2013

- Location within Somerset
- Former names: St George's Chapel

General information
- Location: Taunton, Somerset
- Coordinates: 51.012397°N 3.105149°W
- Opened: 3 July 1822

Listed Building – Grade II*
- Official name: Masonic Hall
- Designated: 4 June 1952
- Reference no.: 1060044

The Masonic Hall in Taunton, Somerset, is designated by Historic England as a Grade II* listed building. It was originally built in the early 19th century as St George's Chapel, the first Roman Catholic chapel open for public worship in Taunton since the Reformation. The building, which forms the end of a terrace, features a series of prominent Ionic pilasters along the front and southern end.

Opened in 1822, St George's Chapel served Taunton's growing Catholic community for over 35 years, before they moved to a larger church which was completed in 1860. After being rented out for a time, when it was known as St George's Hall, the building was then sold in 1878 to a company acting on behalf of a group of Freemasons, who purchased it to provide a home for the Unanimity & Sincerity Lodge. It now hosts nine different Lodges of the Freemasons.

== History ==
=== Catholic chapel ===
Prior to the Reformation, Taunton had three Catholic churches; the Church of St Peter and St Paul, which was part of Taunton Priory, and was destroyed during the Dissolution; and the Churches of St Mary Magdalene and St James, which both became Anglican. The Roman Catholic Church all but died in Taunton; one book records that prior to the 19th century, "there were no Papists in Taunton". In 1787, a Mission Rector was sent to Taunton. Four years later, Catholic chapels were legalised, and the rector registered a chapel in a house on Canon Street. Upon his death in 1818, a new rector was appointed; Rev. Samuel Fisher. The new rector immediately began raising money for a permanent church, which was opened on 3 July 1822. The building was located on The Crescent, and was dedicated to Saint George. The church seated 200; greater than the estimated 120 Catholic resident in Taunton. This new church, known as St George's Chapel, was the first public Roman Catholic church in Taunton since the Reformation.

Within 35 years, the congregation had swelled, and St George's Chapel was no longer large enough to serve the Catholics of Taunton. The nearby Franciscan Convent purchased a plot of land adjacent to their own in 1858, and St George's Church was opened in April 1860, to replace the chapel of the same dedication.

=== Masonic Hall ===
The chapel building was subsequently let out for various uses, and known as "St George's Hall". In 1878, the hall was purchased by members of the Unanimity & Sincerity Lodge of the Freemasons, and named the Masonic Hall; it was consecrated by Henry Herbert, 4th Earl of Carnarvon, the Provincial Grand Master of Somerset Freemasons in January the following year. The Unanimity & Sincerity Lodge had originally met in Ilminster after their constitution in 1788, and moved to Taunton in 1797, meeting at the London Inn. The owners of the building, though members of the Freemasons had purchased the property as a limited company, and also rented the building to other users: Richard Huish's School taught their girl's classes from there, and the cellars were used by a wine merchant.

After purchasing the building, the Masonic Hall Company, in addition to the necessary decorating, also commissioned a builder, William Templemen to carry out a number of structural changes; the lobby was split into three rooms, to provide a "robing chamber" on one side, and a small waiting room on the other. Beyond the large main hall, what had been the vestry had a temporary partition removed, and a toilet added. The staircase down to the kitchen was moved, and in the kitchen itself a cooking range was installed. In the mid-1880s, an extension was made to the hall by the same builder; a two-storey building, of which the ground floor served as a warehouse. The extension replaced a previous building that had been deemed "unfit for repair". The extension was completed at a cost of £337 and 10 shillings, slightly more than the initial estimate. By 1892, the hall was no longer being used by the school, now known as Bishop Fox's, for their girl's lessons. Further renovations were carried out around that time at a cost of just over £180.

The hall continued to be let out for various social functions, and is currently home to nine lodges of the Freemasons; Unanimity & Sincerity Lodge, Lodge of St George, Taunton Deane Lodge, Queens College Lodge, Old Aluredian Lodge, Taunton School Lodge, Richard Huish Lodge, Vivary Lodge and the Emergency Services Lodge. (Note: As of February 2015.)

== Architecture ==
The Masonic Hall sits at the southern end of a terrace. It has a stucco front, with two pairs of Ionic pilasters; the larger ones frame the building, and appear to support an overhanging cornice with a decorative dentil finish. The smaller pilasters are either side of a large doorway, and are topped by a pediment. The double wooden doors have six panels, and are fronted by six steps which are almost the same width as the building. On the southern side of the building, more Ionic pilasters rise the height of the building, spread between four large windows.

The hall is designated by Historic England as a Grade II* listed building, and is considered to form a group with Numbers 1–11 and 15–20 The Crescent, which are both similarly Grade II* listed, and with the Grade II listed properties; 21 and 22 The Crescent, Somerset County Club, Dragon Book Shop and Number 14 Bath Place.
