= St Peter's Church, Langford Budville =

Church in Somerset, England

Church of St. Peter
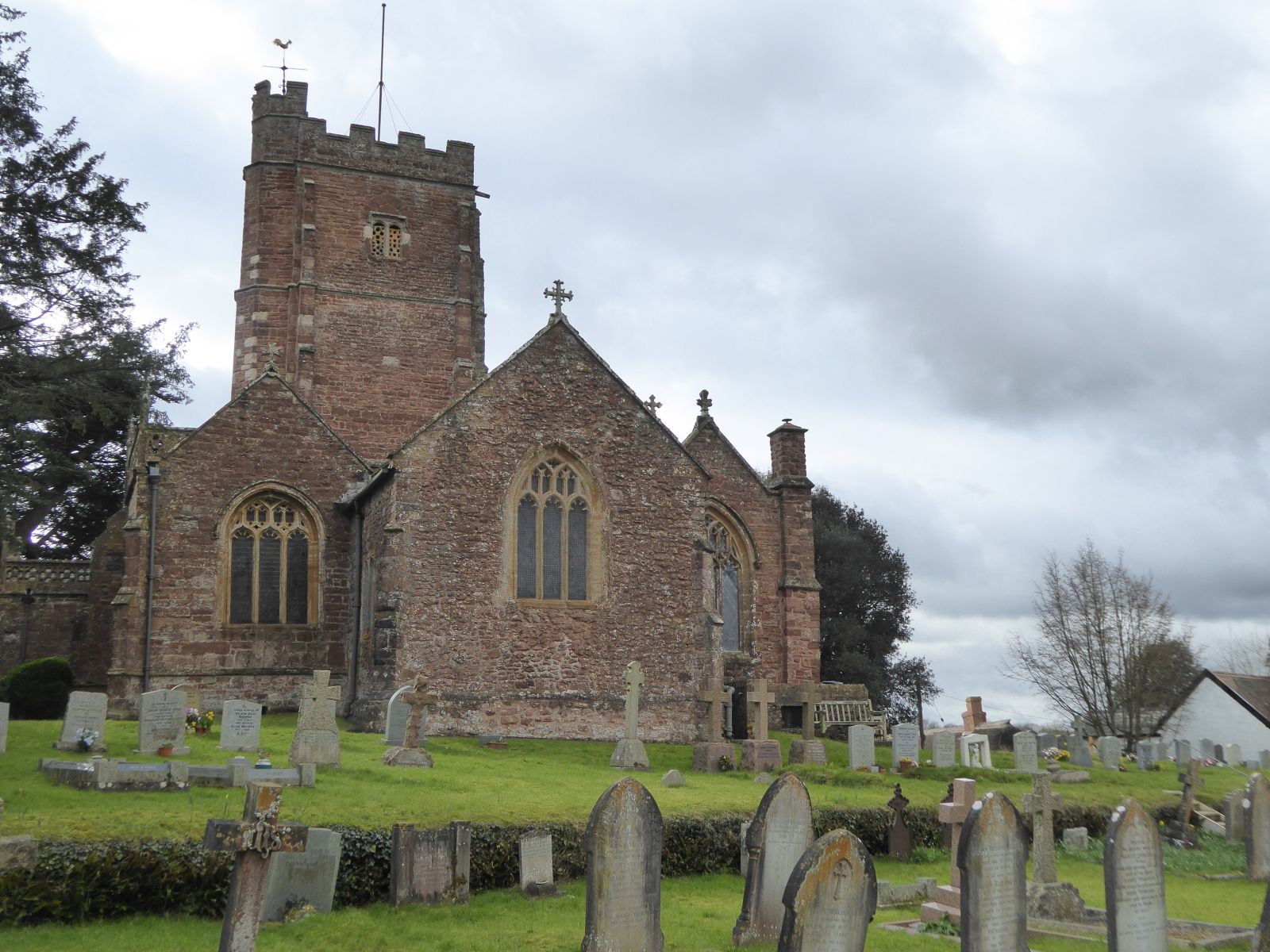

- Location within Somerset

General information
- Location: Langford Budville, England
- Coordinates: 50.9988°N 3.2669°W
- Completed: 15th century

The Church of St. Peter in Langford Budville, Somerset, England dates from the 15th century and has been designated as a Grade I listed building.

The red sandstone church has the capacity for about 150 people, including the north aisle which was added in 1866 to accommodate worshippers from Binden House.

The tower was added in 1509 and the south aisle soon afterwards. The church was restored in 1846 and the north aisle added in 1866. The vestry and organ chamber were added in 1873. The tower holds five bells which were re-hung as part of the refurbishment in the 1990s, which also included repairs to the roof and stonework. There is a War Memorial in the form of a brass plaque.

Until 1863 Langford Budville was a chapelry of Milverton, and in 1930 Runnington was united with the benefice.

The parish is within the Wellington and district benefice which is part of the Tone deanery.

== See also ==
- Grade I listed buildings in Taunton Deane
- List of Somerset towers
- List of ecclesiastical parishes in the Diocese of Bath and Wells

Media related to St Peter's Church, Langford Budville at Wikimedia Commons
