= No 18, Fore Street, Taunton =

- Location within Somerset

General information
- Location: England
- Coordinates: 51.0136°N 3.1013°W

No 18, Fore Street is a street in Taunton, Somerset, England. It is known to have a colourwashed Victorian front, to an earlier building. It has been designated as a Grade II* listed building for the interiors. The interior has enriched plaster ceilings and friezes, one of which is dated 1627.

Nearby, there is a 16th- or 17th-century arch leading to Bath Place. Also close is a Tudor Tavern dating to 1578.

== See also ==
- Grade II* listed buildings in Taunton Deane
