= St Mary's Church, West Buckland =

Church in West Buckland, England

Church of St Mary
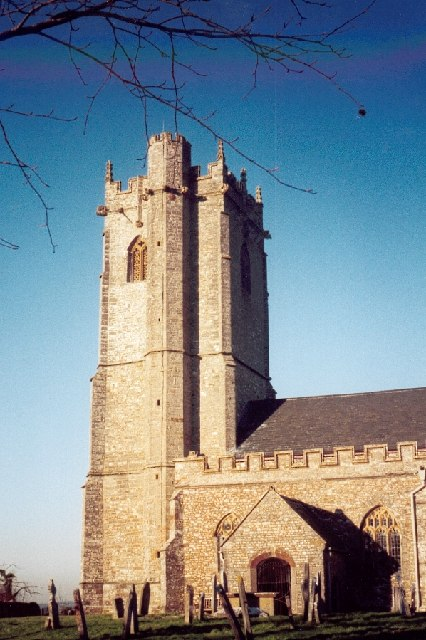

- Location within Somerset

General information
- Location: West Buckland, England
- Coordinates: 50.9778°N 3.1789°W
- Completed: 13th century

The Anglican Church of St Mary in West Buckland, Somerset, England has 13th-century origins and has been designated as a Grade I listed building.

The church was built, on the site of an earlier Norman structure, between 1275 and 1300. It consists of a two-bay aisled nave, chancel and north and south chapels. It has a hammerbeam roof. The crenelated three-stage tower was built around 1509. It is supported by diagonal buttresses. It includes six bells, the oldest of which is from 1606. They were cast by the Whitechapel Bell Foundry. In 1838 a gallery was built for the choir and organ, but this was removed in 1891.

The interior includes a Purbeck marble font from 1140.

The parish is part of the Wellington and District benefice within the Diocese of Bath and Wells.

== See also ==
- List of Grade I listed buildings in Taunton Deane
- List of towers in Somerset
- List of ecclesiastical parishes in the Diocese of Bath and Wells
