= Tudor Tavern, Taunton =

Grade I listed building in Taunton, England

Tudor Tavern
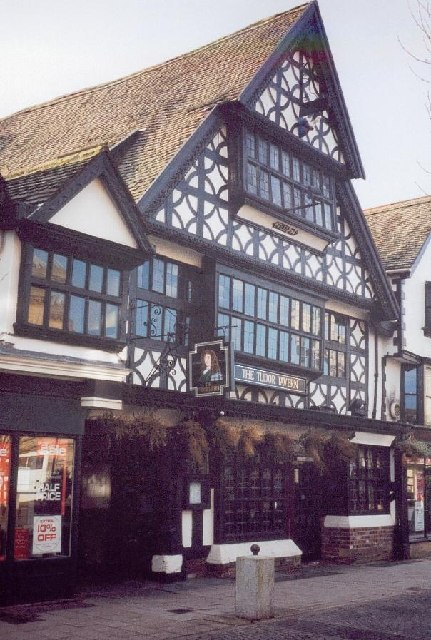

- Location within Somerset

General information
- Location: Taunton, England
- Coordinates: 51.0136°N 3.1013°W
- Completed: 1578

The Tudor Tavern at No 15 Fore Street, Taunton, Somerset, England has been designated as a Grade I listed building. Built in 1578, the house is three storeys high of a timber-frame construction, with jettied first and second floors. The frontage is of carved bressummers with interlocking curved braces, while the roof is red tiles. There is a medieval hall with an open trussed roof behind the front.

== Architecture ==
The Tudor Tavern, also known as "Ancient House", is located at 15 Fore Street, Taunton. It is a three-storey timbered house with a forward jutting first and second floor. The front is carved with the initials T.T. and I.T. and the year 1578. The high, steep roof is clad with red tiles, the upper part overhanging the 8-light oriel window on the second floor. The first floor has a nine-light oriel window with further lights on either side making 17 lights altogether. Each of these windows has leaded lights with transomes and mullions. The interior of the house has been largely restored but the medieval hall with its trussed roof and arched braces survives.

The cottage at the rear of the Tudor Tavern is part of the same building. It was previously known as Halliday's Shop and can be approached through an archway and narrow court. It is a timber-framed, two-storey building with a single long room below, now used as a bar, and a jettied upper floor. It is said to have been the servants quarters of the town house of the Portmans or Orchard Portman. It is close to another building from the early 17th century at No 18, Fore Street, Taunton. It was Grade I listed in 1952.

== History ==
The property is one of the few buildings of its era to survive in Taunton; research suggests the neighbouring buildings dated from the 16th or 17th century. It was originally used as a clothiers shop, and the owners expanded the property while in business. The clothiers, Thomas and Joan Trowbridge, have their initials (T.T. and I.T.) above the door. The building became a grocer during the 17th century, owned by Thomas Baker, whose daughters were known as the 'maids of Taunton' and were there to welcome Duke of Monmouth when they visited the Taunton. The building remained a grocer through the 19th century, owned by three generations of the Turle family. In the 1870s, the building became an antique dealership, Halliday & Sons. In 2003, it was leased by Caffè Nero and refurbished at a cost of £200,000, after being empty for years.

== See also ==
- List of Grade I listed buildings in Taunton Deane
