= Church of St Andrew, Wiveliscombe =

Church in Somerset, England

Church Of St Andrew
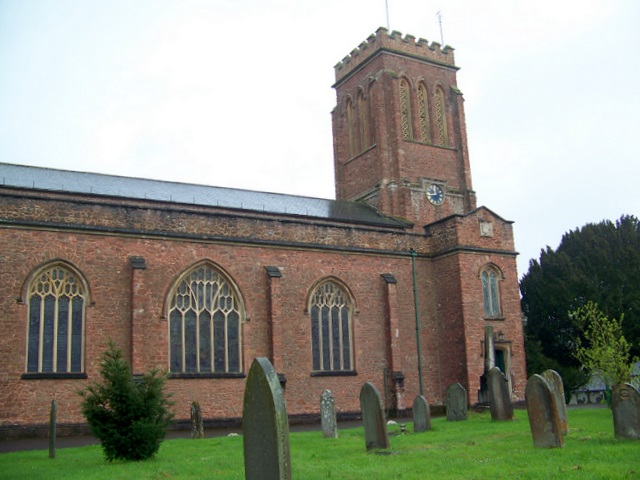

- Location within Somerset
- 51.0411°N 3.3097°W
- Location: Wiveliscombe, Somerset, England

History
- Built: 1829

Listed Building – Grade II*
- Official name: Church Of St Andrew
- Designated: 25 January 1956
- Reference no.: 1177072

Listed Building – Grade II*
- Official name: Churchyard cross, Church of St Andrew
- Designated: 25 January 1956
- Reference no.: 1177103

The Church Of St Andrew in Wiveliscombe, Somerset, England was built in 1829. It is a Grade II* listed building.

== History ==
The church was built by Richard Carver between 1827 and 1829, on the site of an earlier medieval church. It originally had a gallery but this is now the organ loft. The Rose window was added in 1915.

The parish is part of the Wiveliscombe and the Hills benefice, within the Diocese of Bath and Wells.

== Architecture ==
The red sandstone building has hamstone dressings and a slate roof. The aisle is of five bays. The three-stage tower is at the western end of the church.

Inside the church are a 14th-century font from the earlier church along with the tombs of Humphrey Wyndham and his wife who died in the early 17th century.

The churchyard cross was erected in the 14th century. It has an octagonal base and tapering shaft. The head of the cross is missing.

== See also ==
- List of ecclesiastical parishes in the Diocese of Bath and Wells
