= St Michael's Church, Orchard Portman =

Church in Somerset, England

Church of St Michael
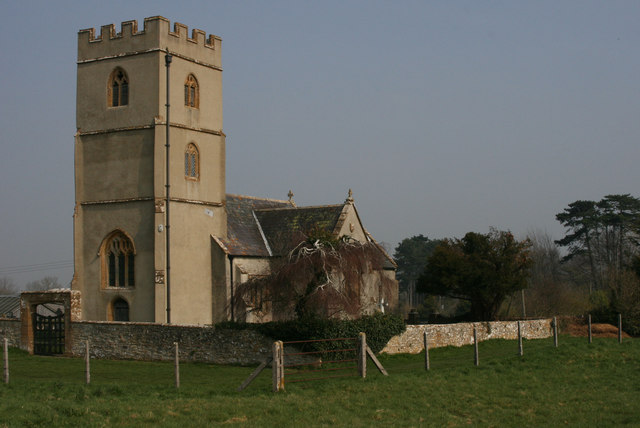

- Location within Somerset
- 50.9893°N 3.0789°W
- Type: Parish Church
- Location: Orchard Portman, Somerset, England

History
- Built: Norman period

Listed Building – Grade II*
- Official name: Church of St Michael
- Designated: 25 February 1955
- Reference no.: 1060391

The Anglican Church of St Michael in Orchard Portman, Somerset, England, dates from the Norman period. It is a Grade II* listed building.

== History ==
The church was built in the Norman period. The chancel was rebuilt in the early 15th century and the tower around 1540, with further building work in the 19th and 20th centuries.

The church formed part of the former Portman family estate. The Portman chapel was erected as the south aisle around 1450, demolished in 1844 and rebuilt again in 1910.

The parish is part of the Seven Sowers benefice which includes Beercrocombe, Curry Mallet, Stoke St Mary, Hatch Beauchamp, Staple Fitzpaine and West Hatch. It is within the Diocese of Bath and Wells.

== Architecture ==
The church consists of a chancel, vestry, three-bay nave and south chapel. The chancel has a wagon roof with plastered barrel vault. The crenellated three-stage tower is supported by diagonal buttresses.

Inside the church is a hexagonal Jacobean style pulpit. There is some medieval stained glass; however, most is from the 19th and 20th centuries.

Dr Thomas Bond (1841–1901) a British physician considered by some to be the first offender profiler, and best known for his association with the notorious Jack the Ripper murders of 1888, was buried in the churchyard.

== See also ==
- List of ecclesiastical parishes in the Diocese of Bath and Wells
