= Church of St Mary, Cheddon Fitzpaine =

Church in Somerset, England

Church of St Mary
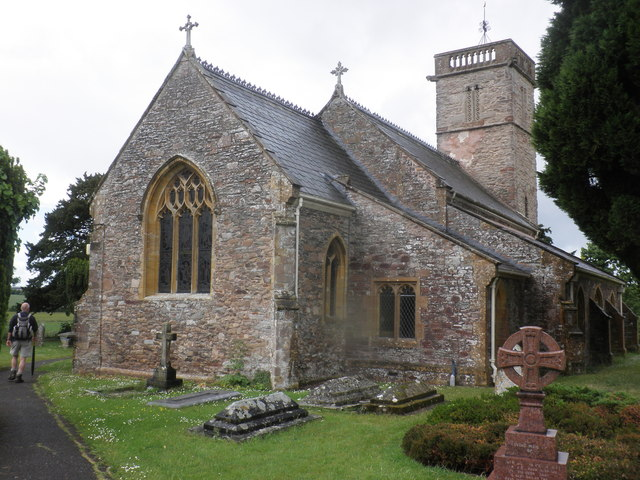

- Location within Somerset
- 51.0427°N 3.0813°W
- Type: Parish Church
- Location: Cheddon Fitzpaine, Somerset, England

Listed Building – Grade II*
- Official name: Church of St Mary
- Designated: 25 February 1955
- Reference no.: 1060508

The Anglican Church of St Mary in Cheddon Fitzpaine, Somerset, England was built in the late 13th century. It is a Grade II* listed building.

== History ==
The tower of the church was built in the late 13th century. The rest of the building is 15th century with enlargement in the 16th century and Victorian restoration in 1861.

In 2011 a grant of £10,000 was received from the National Churches Trust.

The parish is part of the South Quantock benefice of West Monkton with Kingston St Mary and Broomfield within the Diocese of Bath and Wells.

== Architecture ==
The red sandstone building has hamstone dressings. It has a three-bay nave, chancel, and south porch. The north and south aisles each have three bays. The three-stage west tower is unbuttressed and topped by a parapet.

The interior of the church includes pew ends from 1530.

The Old Rectory near the church was built around 1861, possibly by Edward Jeboult and later turned into 3 dwellings.

== See also ==
- List of ecclesiastical parishes in the Diocese of Bath and Wells
