= West Buckland =

Village and civil parish in Somerset, England

Coordinates: 50.9779°N 3.1765°W

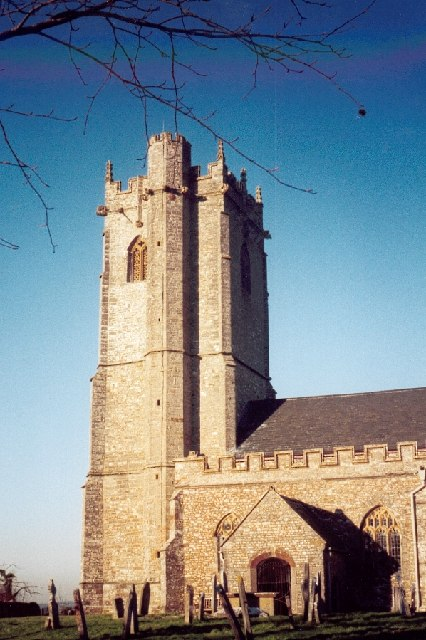
- Church of St Mary, West Buckland

- Location within Somerset
- Population: 1,189 (2011)
- OS grid reference: ST175205
- Unitary authority: Somerset Council
- Ceremonial county: Somerset
- Region: South West
- Country: England
- Sovereign state: United Kingdom
- Post town: WELLINGTON
- Postcode district: TA21
- Dialling code: 01823
- Police: Avon and Somerset
- Fire: Devon and Somerset
- Ambulance: South Western
- UK Parliament: Taunton and Wellington

West Buckland is a village and civil parish in Somerset, England, situated 5 miles (8.0 km) south west of Taunton. The parish has a population of 1,189.

== History ==
In 904, certain lands were the basis of a charter to Asser, Bishop of Sherborne, later confirmed in 908. It is thought that Buckland was perhaps known then as Bocland; the name for ‘chartered land’. Following this charter, or even earlier, the name West Buckland was established. But why West was added is unknown – perhaps to distinguish it from Buckland St Mary to the east.

The parish of West Buckland was part of the Kingsbury Hundred.

Buckland or Minchin Buckland Priory was founded as a house of St John the Baptist around 1166 for Augustinian canons. The buildings burned down in 1234.

Gerbestone Manor was largely rebuilt in the late 16th century, although some fabric from the 13th century house remains. It is a Grade II* listed building. The house has been owned by a succession of families of local gentry and is now used as a wedding venue and for corporate events. The main two-storey chert stone building is accompanied by various outbuildings including barns and a mill.

== Governance ==
The parish council has responsibility for local issues, including setting an annual precept (local rate) to cover the council’s operating costs and producing annual accounts for public scrutiny. The parish council evaluates local planning applications and works with the local police, district council officers, and neighbourhood watch groups on matters of crime, security, and traffic. The parish council's role also includes initiating projects for the maintenance and repair of parish facilities, as well as consulting with the district council on the maintenance, repair, and improvement of highways, drainage, footpaths, public transport, and street cleaning. Conservation matters (including trees and listed buildings) and environmental issues are also the responsibility of the council.

For local government purposes, since 1 April 2023, the village comes under the unitary authority of Somerset Council. Prior to this, it was part of the non-metropolitan district of Somerset West and Taunton (formed on 1 April 2019) and, before this, the district of Taunton Deane (established under the Local Government Act 1972). From 1894-1974, for local government purposes, West Buckland was part of Wellington Rural District.

The appropriate electoral ward is called 'Monument'. Although West Buckland is the most populous area the ward goes west to Sampford Arundel. The total population of this ward taken at the 2011 Census was 2,184.

It is also part of the Taunton and Wellington county constituency represented in the House of Commons of the Parliament of the United Kingdom. It elects one Member of Parliament (MP) by the first past the post system of election.

== Religious sites ==
The parish Church of St Mary has 13th-century origins and has been designated as a Grade I listed building.
