= Gerbestone Manor =

House in West Buckland, Somerset, England

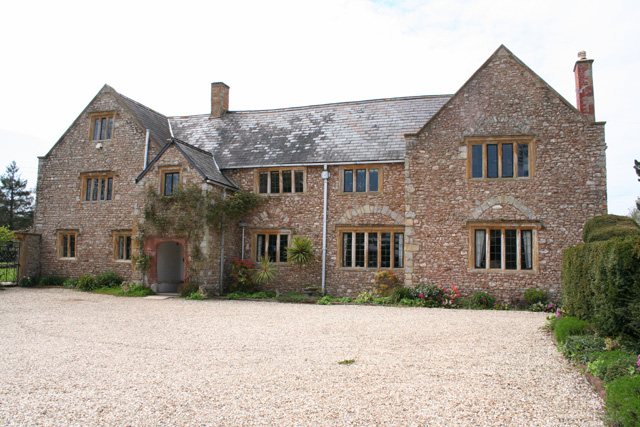

- Location within Somerset
- 50.9677°N 3.195°W
- Location: West Buckland, Somerset, England

Listed Building – Grade II*
- Official name: Gerbestone Manor
- Designated: 25 January 1956
- Reference no.: 1344582

Listed Building – Grade II
- Official name: Barn, about 100 m north of Gerbestone Manor
- Designated: 7 August 1986
- Reference no.: 1060287

Listed Building – Grade II
- Official name: Barn containing squash court, about 30 m west of Gerbestone Manor
- Designated: 7 August 1986
- Reference no.: 1180181

Gerbestone Manor in West Buckland, Somerset, England was largely rebuilt in the late 16th century, although some fabric from the 13th century house remains. It is a Grade II* listed building.

The house has been owned by a succession of families of local gentry and is now used as a wedding venue and for corporate events. The main two-storey chert stone building is accompanied by various outbuildings including barns and a mill.

== History ==
The Gerbestone estate was created around 1235, when a local knight "Gerebert" was granted an exemption from paying taxes by Bishop Jocelin of Wells. In 1333 Bishop Ralph of Shrewsbury granted a licence for the addition of an oratory. It then passed through a succession of owners and leaseholders until the 1580s.

The current building was largely constructed in the late 16th century including the use of chimneys for the first time. It was further enlarged, with the addition of wings to the house and additional staircases, in the 17th century when owned by the Wyndham family of Orchard Wyndham. In 1612 the owner was Thomas Frances, who married Suzanna, daughter of George Luttrell of Dunster Castle and later it was owned by John Ewell. Suzanna Francis's children married into the families of other local landowners including that of Francis Popham and supported both sides during the English Civil War. In 1693 the house was mortgaged by Nicholas Frauncies and then sold to Sir John Elwell whose descendants lived there until 1894 when it was bought by William Temlett Marke.

Further restoration was undertaken in the 1920s and 1930s by Hubert Lidbetter, for the Lloyd-Fox family who were the owners at the time, which included a new staircase and windows and the removal of all the plaster on walls and ceilings. During World War II the house was used to accommodate 30 evacuees.

In 2007 the house was bought by the investment banker, Spencer Weir, for £2,5 million.

The long barn was converted, with attached watermill, in 2014 and is now used as a wedding and events venue. The main house can sleep 24 guests.

The historical records from the manor are held by the South West Heritage Trust.

== Architecture ==
The two-storey house is built of chert stone with Hamstone dressings and slate roofs.

The long barn was built in the 16th or 17th century and has a cruck roof with a bell-cote at its apex. Another 18th-century barn. which had been a pigeon loft, has been converted into a squash court. The estate also had an overshot watermill.
