= Church of All Saints, Norton Fitzwarren =

Church of All Saints
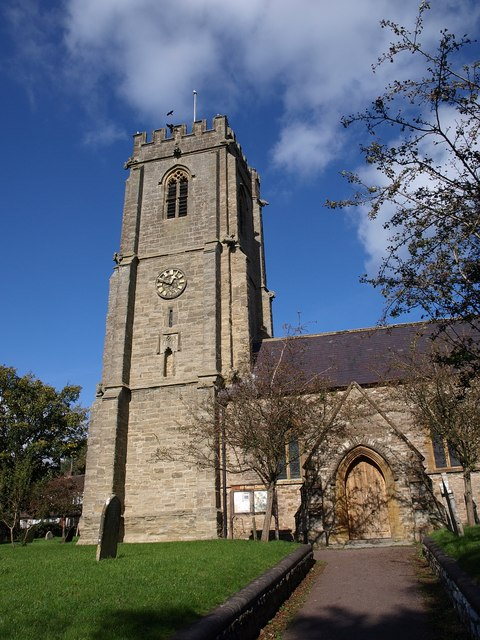

- Location in Somerset
- 51.0282°N 3.1457°W
- OS grid reference: ST 19679 25969
- Location: Norton Fitzwarren
- Country: England
- Denomination: Anglican
- Website: www.stjohnswithallsaints.btck.co.uk
Further details
History
Founded	Late 13th or early 14th century
Administration
Archdiocese	Taunton
Diocese	Bath and Wells
Archdeaconry	Taunton
Deanery	Taunton
Parish	Norton Fitzwarren
Clergy
Rector	Rev. Stephen Kivett

The Church of All Saints is an Anglican church in Norton Fitzwarren, Somerset, England, which dates from the late 13th or early 14th century. It is located in the deanery of Taunton, within the diocese of Bath and Wells. It is a Grade II* listed building.

== Usage ==
The church is part of the Church of England, and forms a United Benefice with the Church of St John, Staplegrove. The two churches share the same rector, The Reverend Paul Irving, and are within the deanery of Taunton, within the diocese of Bath and Wells.

== History and architecture ==
The church originally dates from around the late 13th or early 14th century, but underwent two periods of restoration in the mid 19th century, during which the porch and chancel were rebuilt, and a vestry was added. The church is built of North Curry sandstone, with hamstone dressing and a slate roof. It has a western crenellated tower which has set-back buttresses. At each of the three stages of the tower, it has gargoyles on the corner edges. A clock, and empty niche for a statue are featured on the southern face of the tower. The tower includes 19th century stained glass. The arcade is of octagonal piers topped with plain capitals. The church was classified as a Grade II* listed building in February 1955.

The church features an early 16th-century 3/5 bay rood screen, of the Devon style, which originally spanned across the entire nave and aisle, but is now split. The lower section of the screen depicts the story of the Dragon of Norton Camp. The south west corner of the graveyard is believed to have been a burial site for gypsies.

== See also ==
- List of ecclesiastical parishes in the Diocese of Bath and Wells
