= Langford Budville =

Village in Somerset, England

Coordinates: 50.9989°N 3.2669°W

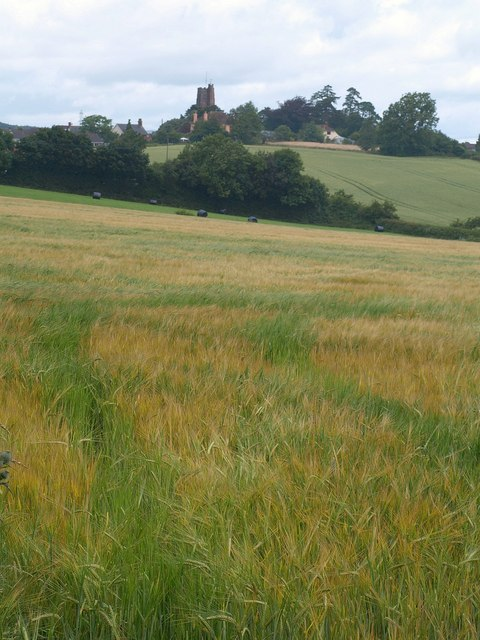
- Church of St. Peter, Langford Budville

- Location within Somerset
- Population: 535 (2011)
- OS grid reference: ST111229
- Unitary authority: Somerset Council
- Ceremonial county: Somerset
- Region: South West
- Country: England
- Sovereign state: United Kingdom
- Post town: WELLINGTON
- Postcode district: TA21
- Dialling code: 01823
- Police: Avon and Somerset
- Fire: Devon and Somerset
- Ambulance: South Western
- UK Parliament: Tiverton and Minehead

Langford Budville is a village and civil parish in Somerset, England, situated near the River Tone 2 miles (3.2 km) north-west of Wellington, 4.5 miles (7.2 km) from Wiveliscombe and 6 miles (9.7 km) west of Taunton. The parish includes the hamlets of Bindon, Lower Chipley, Lower Wellisford, Ramsey and Runnington. The parish has a population of 535.

Langford Budville has a few basic facilities; like most villages it has a church (St Peter's), a public house (The Martlet), a school (Langford Budville Church of England Primary), as well as a hotel.

== History ==
The parishes of Langford Budville and Runnington were part of the Milverton Hundred,

In the 1830s the Grand Western Canal was built, which included the construction of Harpford Bridge at Langford Budville. A new warehouse was also built.

== Places of interest ==
Bindon House has 17th-century origins but received a new front in the 19th century. Around 1865 the west wing and entrance porch were added, and around 1880 the Flemish gables and east wing were added. The east wing was demolished in the 1930s. The porch gable end of the south front has square pilasters with a crest of the Warre family. The property was purchased by Henry Warre in 1862, having previously been tenanted by relatives of Spencer Perceval, the Prime Minister murdered in 1812.

The church of St Peter dates from the 15th century and has been designated by English Heritage as a Grade I listed building. Until 1863 Langford Budville was a chapelry of Milverton, and in 1930 Runnington was united with the benefice. The small Church of St Peter and St Paul at Runnington is of a similar age.

The cloth finishing works at Tone Mill is included in the Heritage at Risk Register produced by English Heritage.

Nearby is the Langford Heathfield Site of Special Scientific Interest.

== Governance ==
The parish council has responsibility for local issues, including setting an annual precept (local rate) to cover the council's operating costs and producing annual accounts for public scrutiny. The parish council evaluates local planning applications and works with the local police, district council officers, and neighbourhood watch groups on matters of crime, security, and traffic. The parish council's role also includes initiating projects for the maintenance and repair of parish facilities, as well as consulting with the district council on the maintenance, repair, and improvement of highways, drainage, footpaths, public transport, and street cleaning. Conservation matters (including trees and listed buildings) and environmental issues are also the responsibility of the council.

For local government purposes, since 1 April 2023, the village comes under the unitary authority of Somerset Council. Prior to this, it was part of the non-metropolitan district of Somerset West and Taunton (formed on 1 April 2019) and, before this, the district of Taunton Deane (established under the Local Government Act 1972). From 1894-1974, for local government purposes, Langford Budville was part of Wellington Rural District.

It is also part of the Tiverton and Minehead county constituency represented in the House of Commons of the Parliament of the United Kingdom. It elects one Member of Parliament (MP) by the first past the post system of election.
