= Church of St Michael, Angersleigh =

Church in Somerset, England

Church of St Michael
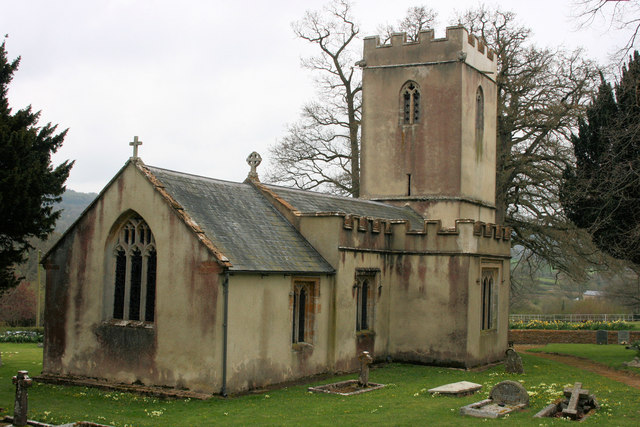

- Location within Somerset
- 50.9621°N 3.1419°W
- Type: Parish Church
- Location: Angersleigh, Somerset, England

History
- Built: 14th century

Listed Building – Grade II*
- Official name: Church of St Michael
- Designated: 25 February 1955
- Reference no.: 1177574

The Anglican Church of St Michael in Angersleigh, Somerset, England was built in the 14th century. It is a Grade II* listed building.

== History ==
The church was granted to the Bishop of Winchester by William the Conqueror, later becoming the property of Taunton Priory.

The tower survives from the 14th century, however much of the rest of the building was rebuilt in the 15th and underwent Victorian restoration around 1855.

The parish, with about 60 people, is part of the Trull with Angersleigh benefice within the Diocese of Bath and Wells.

== Architecture ==
The church consists of a three-bay nave and chancel. The south porch has been converted into a vestry and the north chapel into an organ bay. The crenellated two stage west tower is supported by diagonal buttresses. The oldest of the five bells in the tower dates back to around 1450.

The interior contains woodwork installed by A.E. Eastwood, of Leigh Court, in Pitminster, who was the Lord of the manor, and a local woodwork class in the early 20th century. The reredos was designed by Frederick Bligh Bond. The circular stone font is Norman.

== See also ==
- List of ecclesiastical parishes in the Diocese of Bath and Wells
