= St George's Church, Fons George =

Church of St George
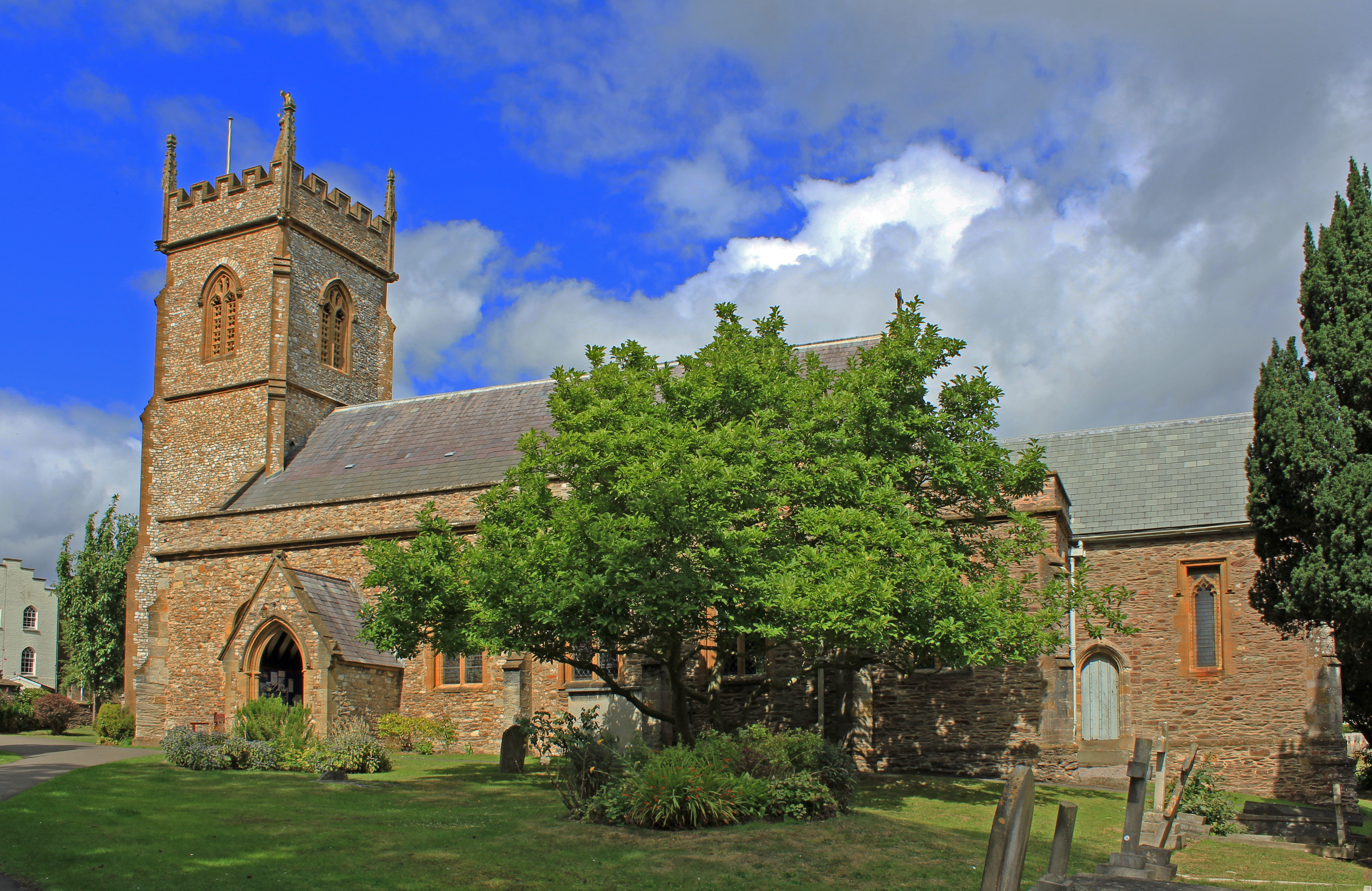

- Location in Somerset
- 51.0093°N 3.1065°W
- Location: Taunton, Somerset
- Country: England
- Denomination: Anglican
- Website: stgchurch.co.uk
Further details
History
Founded	Saxon
Administration
Diocese	Bath and Wells
Archdeaconry	Taunton
Deanery	Taunton
Parish	Wilton
Clergy
Rector	Rev. Nick Griffin

The Church of St George is an Anglican church in Taunton, Somerset, England, dating from Saxon times. It is the parish church for Wilton, within the diocese of Bath and Wells, and a Grade II* listed building.

== Usage ==
The church is part of the Church of England and is the parish church for Wilton, in the deanery of Taunton, within the diocese of Bath and Wells. It is ministered by The Reverend Nick Griffin.

== History and architecture ==
A chapel was established on the site during Saxon times, and a tower was added to the church around the 11th century. By 1308, Wilton was associated with Taunton Priory and was served by the priest from St Mary Magdalene. The church was extensively renovated and extended in the late 1830s by Richard Carver, adding two bays to the nave and a chancel with two chapels in a Gothic style. The tower was demolished and rebuilt in 1853, while further internal restructuring was conducted in 1870 by J. Houghton Spencer.

Although parts of the church retain the Saxon "long and short" stonework, the building is principally 19th-century Gothic architecture, following the work done by Carver. The tower follows the Perpendicular Gothic style of many Somerset village churches; it features two stages, with "diagonal buttresses, embattled parapet, and two-light bell openings". The vestry is slightly more modern than most of the church, dating from around the turn of the 20th century. The church is built of rubble masonry with hamstone dressings, topped by a slate roof.
