= Fitzhead Court and The Manor =

House in Fitzhead, Somerset, England

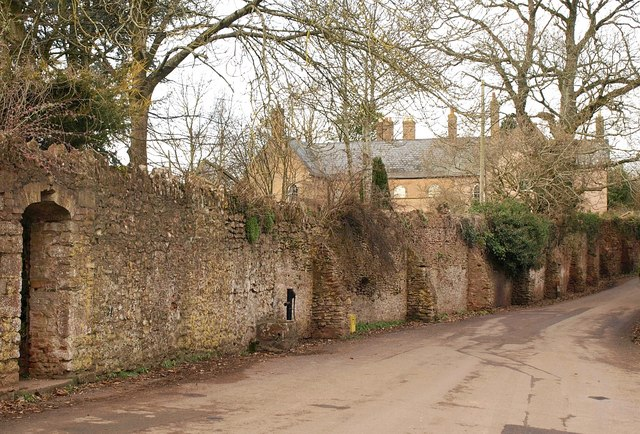

- Location within Somerset
- 51.049°N 3.254°W
- Location: Fitzhead, Somerset, England

History
- Built: Late 16th century

Listed Building – Grade II*
- Official name: Fitzhead Court and The Manor
- Designated: 25 January 1956
- Reference no.: 1059202

Fitzhead Court and The Manor in Fitzhead, Somerset, England was built in the late 16th century and has now been split into two buildings. It is a Grade II* listed building.

== History ==
Fitzhead Court and The Manor date from the late 16th century. The building was constructed by Major Robert Cannon (died 1685) a royalist veteran of the Civil War, and passed through his successors to the Somerville Barons. When the Somerville line died out it passed to Richard Beadon who was the Bishop of Bath and Wells.

The estate was sold to Baron Ashburton in 1840.

== Architecture ==
The plan of the two-storey building of 1:4:1 bays is U-shaped following the addition of service wings to the original court.

The interior includes Jacobean style plaster ceilings.

The red sandstone boundary walls and gate-piers are from the early 19th century.
