= St George's Roman Catholic Church, Taunton =

Church of St George
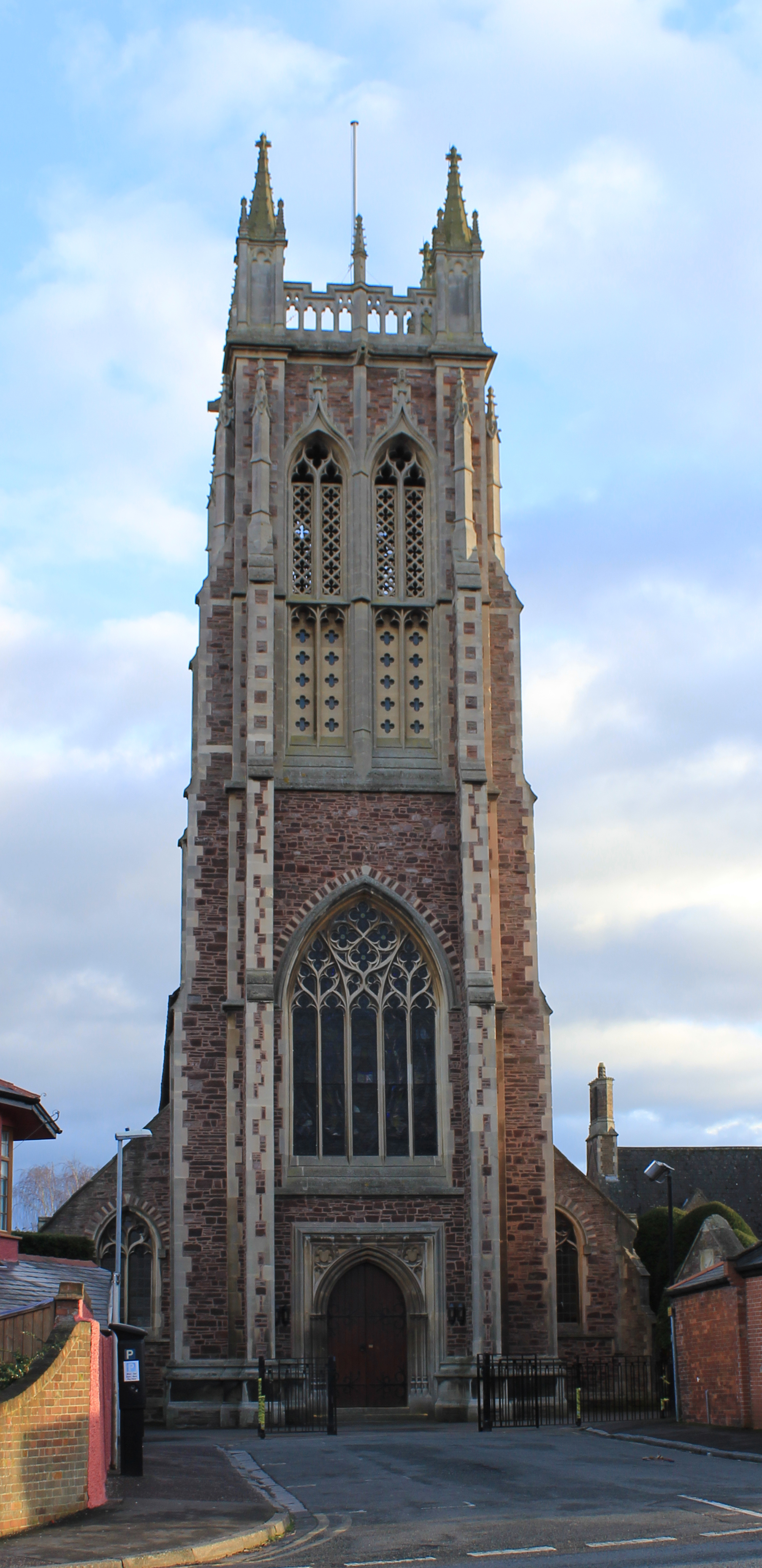
- The church tower

- Location in Somerset
- 51.013°N 3.098°W
- OS grid reference: ST 23033 24290
- Location: Taunton, Somerset
- Country: England
- Denomination: Catholic
- Website: tauntonvalecatholics.com

History
- Status: Parish church
- Founded: 24 April 1860
- Founder: Canon John Mitchell
- Dedication: Saint George
- Consecrated: 23 April 1912

Architecture
- Architect: Benjamin Bucknall
- Years built: 1858–1912
- Groundbreaking: 19 August 1858
- Completed: 23 April 1912
- Construction cost: £6,000

Specifications
- Capacity: 350

Administration
- Province: Birmingham
- Diocese: Clifton
- Deanery: St Dunstan
- Parish: St George, Taunton

Listed Building – Grade II*
- Official name: The Roman Catholic Church of St George
- Designated: 4 July 1975
- Reference no.: 1231201

Listed Building – Grade II
- Official name: Rectory adjoining The Roman Catholic Church of St George
- Designated: 4 July 1975
- Reference no.: 1060068

The Church of St George is a Roman Catholic church in Taunton, Somerset, which dates from the mid-19th century. It was the second Catholic church to be built in Taunton after the Reformation, replacing the much smaller St George's Chapel. The main church building is designated by Historic England as a Grade II* listed building, while the rectory is Grade II listed.

The Catholic community in Taunton grew throughout the 19th century and within 40 years of the completion of St George's Chapel, it was considered too small. The Church of St George was built on land donated by the town's Franciscan Convent, with funding raised by the rector, Rev John Mitchell. It was opened in 1860, although building work continued over the following decades, and a rectory and school were both added to the site. The church was not consecrated until 1912.

St George's was built during the Gothic Revival, and bears resemblance to the Somerset towers. It currently serves as one of two Catholic churches in Taunton, along with the Church of St Teresa's.

== History ==
After the Reformation in the 16th century, Catholicism all but died in Taunton; an 1824 publication, The Protestant's Companion, noted that prior to the 19th century, "there were no Papists in Taunton". This was a slight exaggeration; in 1787 a Mission Rector was sent to Taunton, and four years later, when Catholic chapels were legalised, he registered a chapel in a house on Canon Street. A permanent church, St George's Chapel, was built around thirty years later, by which time it was estimated that there were around 120 Catholics in the town. The chapel could seat 200 people, and by the 1850s the Catholic population of Taunton had swelled to an extent that the chapel was no longer big enough for them.

The nearby Franciscan Convent purchased a plot of land adjacent to their own in 1858, which they donated for the purpose of building a new church, rectory and school. The rector of Taunton at the time, Rev John Mitchell, had grand plans including "a spire to rival that of Salisbury." (Note: Referring to the 404 feet (123 m) high spire on Salisbury Cathedral.) In May 1858, an advertisement appeared in the Taunton Courier for a fund-raising bazaar and lottery for "building the tower and spire", though the lottery was banned by the police. The first stone was laid on 19 August 1858, by the Right Rev William Clifford, the Bishop of Clifton, and building commenced to a design by Benjamin Bucknall. The church was opened just under two years later on 24 April 1860, with William Vaughan, Bishop of Plymouth, leading the Mass, while Francis Amherst, Bishop of Northampton, and James Brown, Bishop of Shrewsbury gave sermons throughout the day.

The rectory was completed shortly after the church, while the school was opened in 1870; lessons had previously been given in a room at the back of St George's Chapel. Work continued on the tower, and further funds were collected in 1875; the following year, one of the builders, George Toller, died after falling around 100 feet (30 m) from the scaffolding. The church was consecrated on 23 April 1912 by the Bishop of Clifton, who was assisted by 24 priests for the ceremony. A stained glass window was added to the west side of the church in June 1928, as a memorial to Canon James O'Shaughnessy who had served as rector of St George's from 1911 until his death in 1927. A few years later, a parish hall was built in the rectory garden.

A second Catholic church was opened in Taunton in 1959; dedicated to Saint Teresa of Lisieux, it is located in the Priorswood area to the north of the town. The Taunton Catholic Church website estimated that there were around 5,000 Catholics in Taunton in 2010. The current rector of St George's is Fr Tom Dubois.

== Architecture ==
The church is built of red Monkton stone, with Bath stone ashlar dressings in an early 14th-century Gothic fashion. Nikolaus Pevsner described it as being a "competent imitation" of a Somerset tower, although he notes that the detailing is more flowing than the typical Perpendicular Gothic style of the Somerset towers. The original design by Bucknall featured an 89 feet (27 m) tall tower, topped by a spire which ascended a further 105 feet (32 m), but the spire was never built. The main entrance to the church is a set of large doors on the tower, facing out onto Billet Street. The cost of the building was estimated at £6,000. The church features a clerestoried nave typical of Gothic churches, and the windows are predominantly of the Decorated Gothic style. The chancel is flanked by two side chapels, which are at the ends of aisles.

The church is designated by Historic England as a Grade II* listed building, and forms a group with the rectory, which is Grade II listed. The rectory is attached to the south-west end of the church, and is of a "late medieval or Tudor style". It is a two-storey building of white brick with ashlar dressings. There is a two-storey porch with diagonal buttresses and a large entrance arch. The roof is steep, with patterned slate tiles.
