= Lydeard House =

House in Bishops Lydeard, Somerset, England

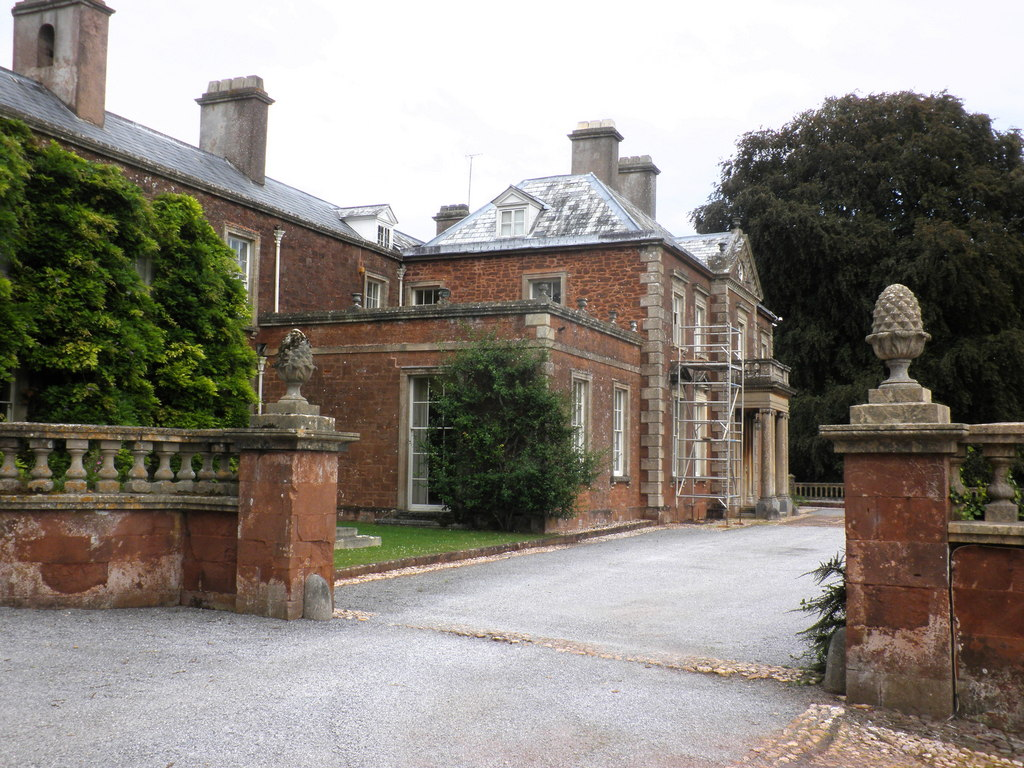

- Location within Somerset
- 51.0623°N 3.1904°W
- Location: Bishops Lydeard, Somerset, England

History
- Built: Mid 18th century

Listed Building – Grade II*
- Official name: Lydeard House, attached stables, and walls abutting entrance to the latter
- Designated: 25 February 1955
- Reference no.: 1295371

Listed Building – Grade II
- Official name: Footbridge and railings over stream 20 metres East of Lydeard House
- Designated: 4 May 1984
- Reference no.: 1175320

Listed Building – Grade II
- Official name: Wall enclosing raised garden to North and East of Lydeard House
- Designated: 4 May 1984
- Reference no.: 1059220

Listed Building – Grade II
- Official name: Wall and gatepiers fronting road, Lydeard House
- Designated: 4 May 1984
- Reference no.: 1344852

Lydeard House in Bishops Lydeard, Somerset, England was built in the mid 18th century. It is a Grade II* listed building.

== History ==
Lydeard House was built in the mid 18th century. It has been enlarged several times.

== Architecture ==
The red sandstone building has limestone dressings and a slate roof. The main block has five bays with the stables set back from the main house and were only joined in the mid 19th century.

The gardens have been restored since 1999 including the dredging of the lake and erection of pergolas. The gardens are now open to the public occasionally as part of the National Gardens Scheme.

A raised garden at the rear of the house is enclosed by a Hindu-Moorish style red sandstone wall. The other walls and gate piers are also of red sandstone.

A footbridge over the stream 20 metres (66 ft) east of the house has three stone arches and wrought iron decoration.
