= Church of St Peter and St Paul, Runnington =

Church in Somerset, England

Church of St Peter and St Paul
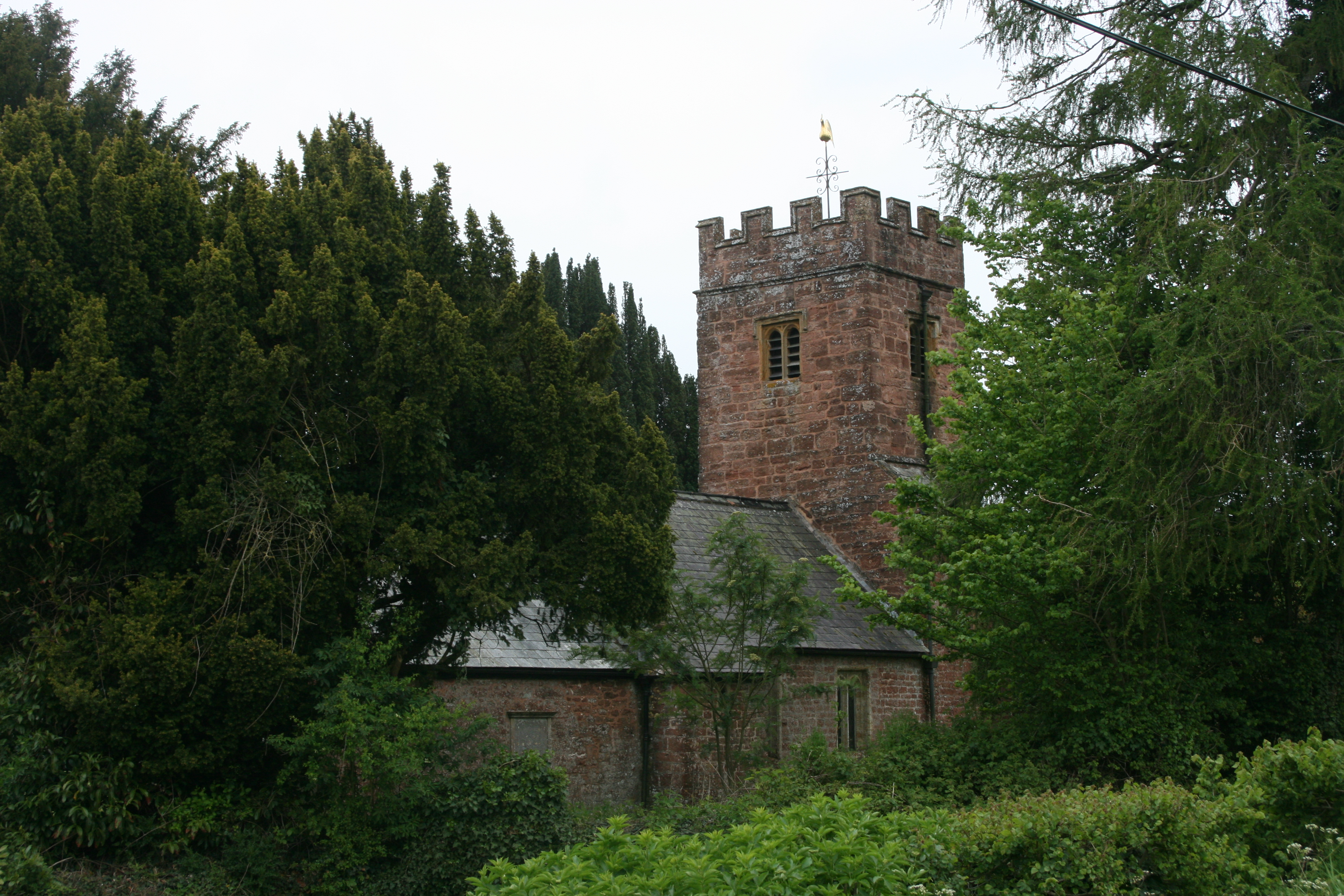

- Location within Somerset
- 50.9895°N 3.2566°W
- Location: Runnington, Langford Budville, Somerset, England

History
- Built: 15th century

Listed Building – Grade II*
- Official name: Church of St Peter
- Designated: 25 January 1956
- Reference no.: 1060352

The Anglican Church of St Peter and St Paul at Runnington in Langford Budville, Somerset, England was built in the 15th century. It is a Grade II* listed building.

== History ==
The nave and tower of the church were built in the 15th century. Around 1840 the chancel was rebuilt and a new roof installed.

The rood screen was removed when the organ was installed.

The parish is part of the Wellington and district benefice within the Diocese of Bath and Wells.

== Architecture ==
The red sandstone building has Hamstone dressing and a tiled roof. The three-stage tower, which was built in 1509, is supported by diagonal buttresses. There are five bells.

== See also ==
- List of ecclesiastical parishes in the Diocese of Bath and Wells
