= Church of the Holy Cross, Hillfarrance =

Church in Hillfarrance, Somerset, England

Church of the Holy Cross
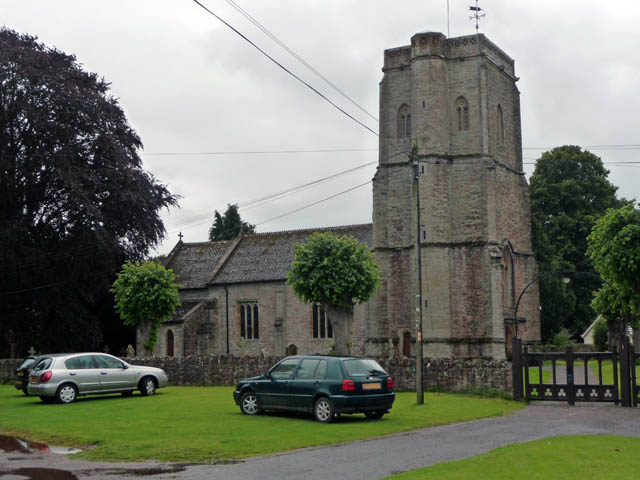

- Location within Somerset
- 51.0151°N 3.1882°W
- Location: Hillfarrance, Oake, Somerset, England

History
- Built: 14th century

Listed Building – Grade II*
- Official name: Church of the Holy Cross
- Designated: 25 January 1956
- Reference no.: 1060326

The Church of the Holy Cross in Hillfarrance, Oake, Somerset, England, was built in the 14th century. It is a Grade II* listed building.

== History ==
The church was built in the 14th and 15th centuries, although the south chapel may contain fabric from an earlier building, with the tower being added in 1540. It then underwent Victorian restoration in 1857 and further work on the roof in 1967.

In 2007 repairs were undertaken and a new kitchen and disabled toilet were installed.

The parish is part of the Deane Vale benefice within the Diocese of Bath and Wells.

== Architecture ==
The red sandstone building has Hamstone dressings. The three-stage tower is supported by diagonal buttresses and topped with a parapet and gargoyles, with a central stair turret. The tower contains a bell chamber, and six bells which were restored by Whitechapel Bell Foundry in 1925.

Within the church is a memorial to the men of the village who died in World War I.

== See also ==
- List of ecclesiastical parishes in the Diocese of Bath and Wells
