= Tonedale Mills =

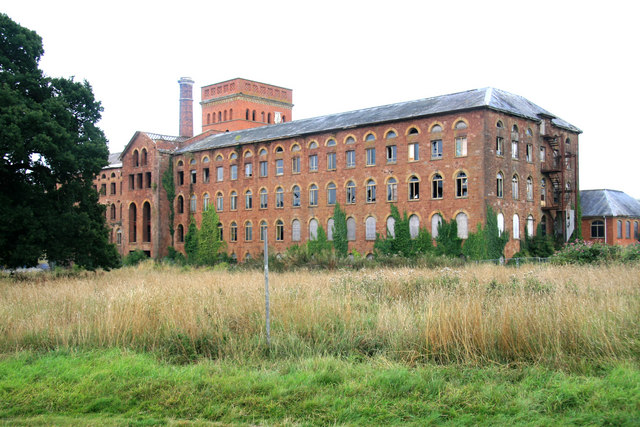
- Pictured in 2010

- Location within Somerset

General information
- Location: Wellington, Somerset
- Coordinates: 50.9849°N 3.2443°W
- Opened: 1790

Tonedale Mills, together with the neighbouring Tone Works, is a large textile mill in Wellington, Somerset, and the largest in South West England. Owned for over 200 years by members of the Fox family (see Fox Brothers), it was most famous for the production of 'Taunton serge', and later the khaki cloth and puttees used by the British Army. The mill was established in the middle of the eighteenth century, and thrived during the Industrial Revolution. At its peak, around 6,500 metres (21,300 ft) of material was produced at the factory each day. The cheap cost of producing fabric in third-world countries contributed to the factory mostly closing during the 1980s, but small-scale production continues on part of the site.

== History ==
During the reign of Queen Elizabeth I, the Were family of Wellington began producing serge as a cottage industry. Edward Fox married Anna Were, and their son Thomas Fox (1747-1821) soon took over the company. The wool industry thrived in areas used for sheep farming, like Somerset, and Taunton serge was particularly popular due to its balance between being light-weight and yet sufficiently thick. The Were family had a fulling mill at the site of Tone Works by 1750, and over the next seventeen years, the family's assets quadrupled as the industry thrived. Thomas Fox, after learning the trade in Germany and the Netherlands for three years, entered the business in 1768, became a partner in 1772 and sole proprietor in 1796, renaming the company and introduced the 'FOX' cloth mark. It was renamed Fox Brothers in 1826. The technological breakthroughs of the late 18th century revolutionised textile manufacture. In the 1790s, Thomas Fox purchased a complex of buildings in Tonedale known variously as the 'Old Town Mills' or the 'Old Flour Mills' to centralise their processes. This move facilitated an increase in both quality and quantity, while cutting costs as other production was brought in-house; basket weaving, joinery, book binding and metalworking was all carried out on the site.

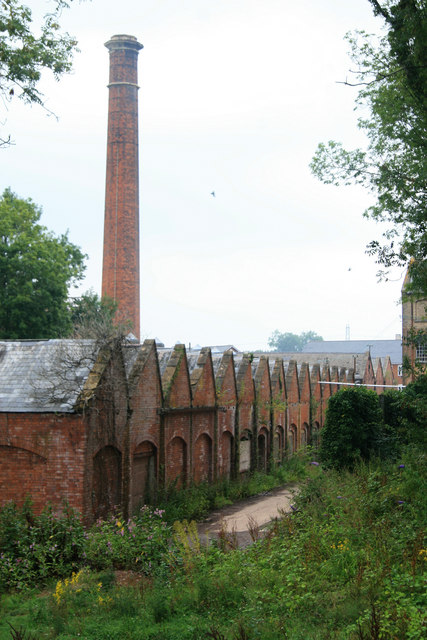
Tonedale Mill in 2010

The site is notable for having remains of each phase of power generation: water, steam and electricity, as when steam power was introduced, Fox Brothers opted to retain their water management system as it might prove useful. The site was continually growing through the nineteenth century, and at its peak employed around 3,600 people around Wellington, and produced 6,500 metres (21,300 ft) of material each day. At the Tonedale complex, dyers working for Fox Brothers developed a khaki dye which was worn by the British soldiers in the Second Boer War. The complex was the largest woollen mill in South West England, and was rare in integrating ancillary processes on the same site. The mill continued to produce cloth on a large scale until it downsized in the 1980s. Most of the site is now abandoned, though parts are still used for small-scale production, and others have been sold off and converted into a small industrial estate. In 1994 the last Fox family house in Wellington Tone Dale House of 1807 was fully restored by Ben and Victoria Fox; Ben is the great-great-great-great-grandson of Thomas Fox. Tone Dale House (since 1996) is now run as an events and hire venue, for house parties, weddings and corporate events, through their company The Big House Co. In 2009, Deborah Meaden and Douglas Cordeaux invested in Fox Brothers, allowing production to continue at Tonedale, after the company had been in danger of falling into bankruptcy.

== Mill complex ==
=== Tone Works ===
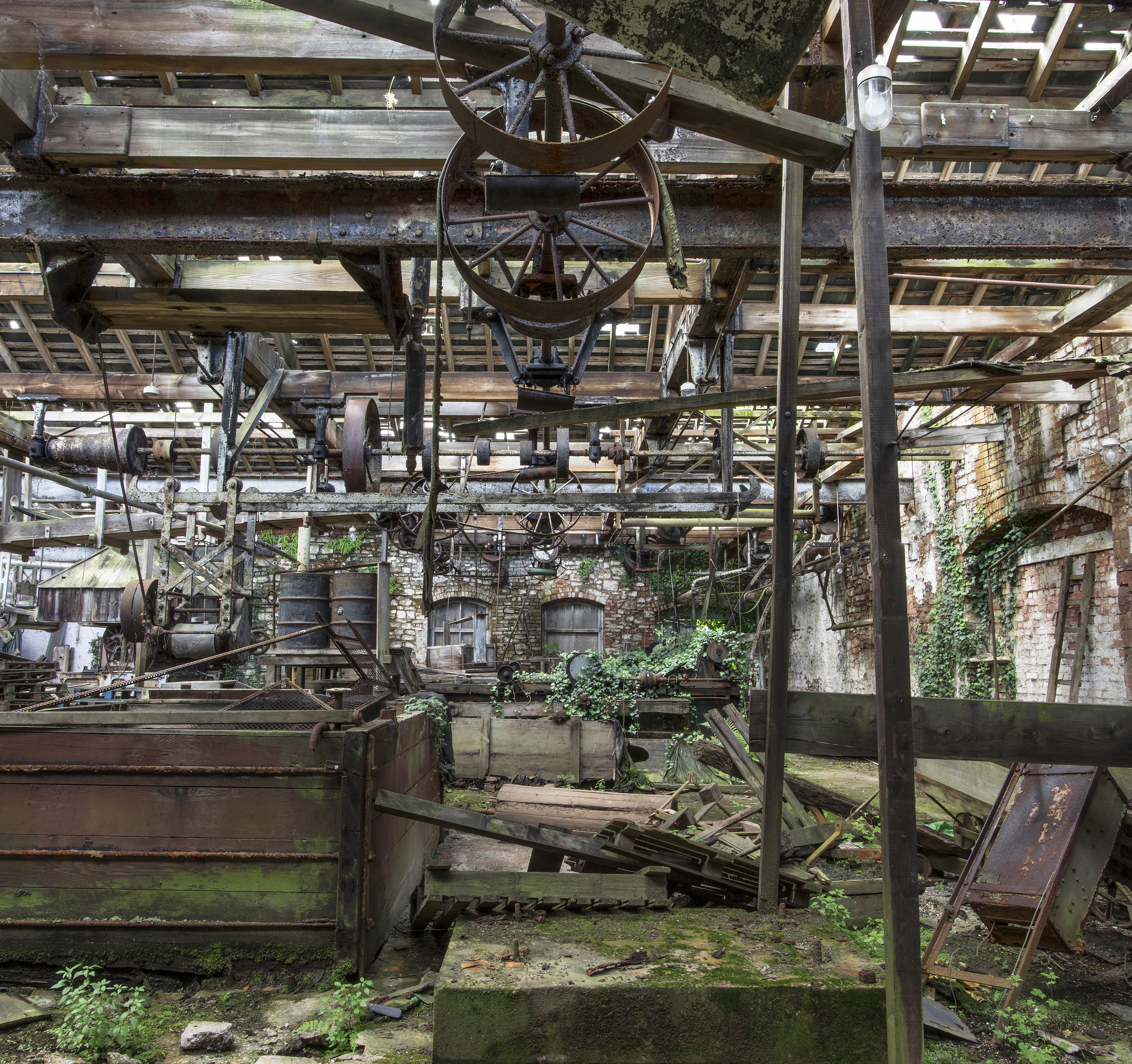
The dye works in 2016

Tone Works, a few hundred metres further north from Tonedale Mills, was developed as the cloth finishing works and dye works. Sitting on the banks of the River Tone, the mills originally used water wheels on the river for power generation, the housing for which are still in place. Later with the introduction of steam and then electric power, the water was used as part of the cloth finishing process, and was managed more carefully with the introduction of a reservoir and sluice gates. Within the reservoir, the water was treated before its use. The finishing works and dye works were both on this site. The former had a boiler house attached, while the latter had an engine house added.

=== Tonedale Mills ===
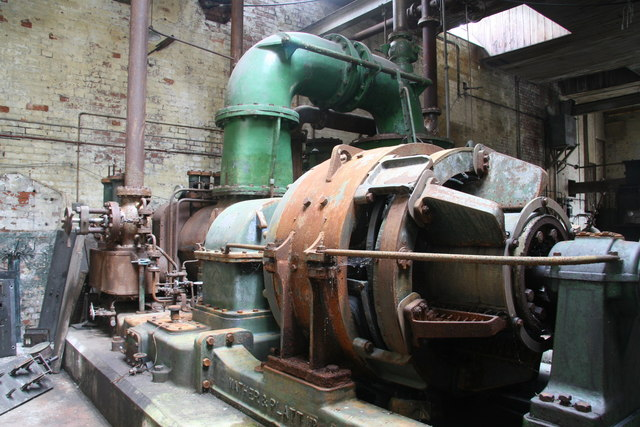
Steam turbine

While the Tone Works site was able to use water wheels on the River Tone for power generation, Tonedale Mills initially used smaller watercourses, Westford Brook and Rockwell Green Stream. In order to ensure that they had a constant supply of water, and that it was used as efficiently as possible, Thomas Fox had water basins excavated between 1801 and 1803, establishing a series of waterways, weirs and sluices to manage the water supply. The original timber mill burned down in 1821, and was replaced by a brick mill, which remains today. The large site features a number of mills, warehouses, workshops and engine houses. Like the north site, evidence of water wheels as well as steam and electric power generation remains. The complex features factories for the preparation of the wool, including a combing shed and a wool cleaning complex.

== Regeneration ==
Plans to convert some of the site into housing were abandoned in 2008, during the 2008 financial crisis, due to low levels of interest. Development on the site was later supported by The Prince's Regeneration Trust, and the site was listed on the Heritage at Risk Register in 2010, while the Tone Works site was identified in 2014 as being among the top ten Heritage at Risk "priority" sites in the South West. Most of the site has been grade II* listed, granting it a level of preservation by Historic England, though the organisation accept that "comprehensive restoration and reuse would not prove commercially viable" due to the size and state of disrepair of the site.
