= Taunton Unitarian Chapel =

Unitarian Chapel
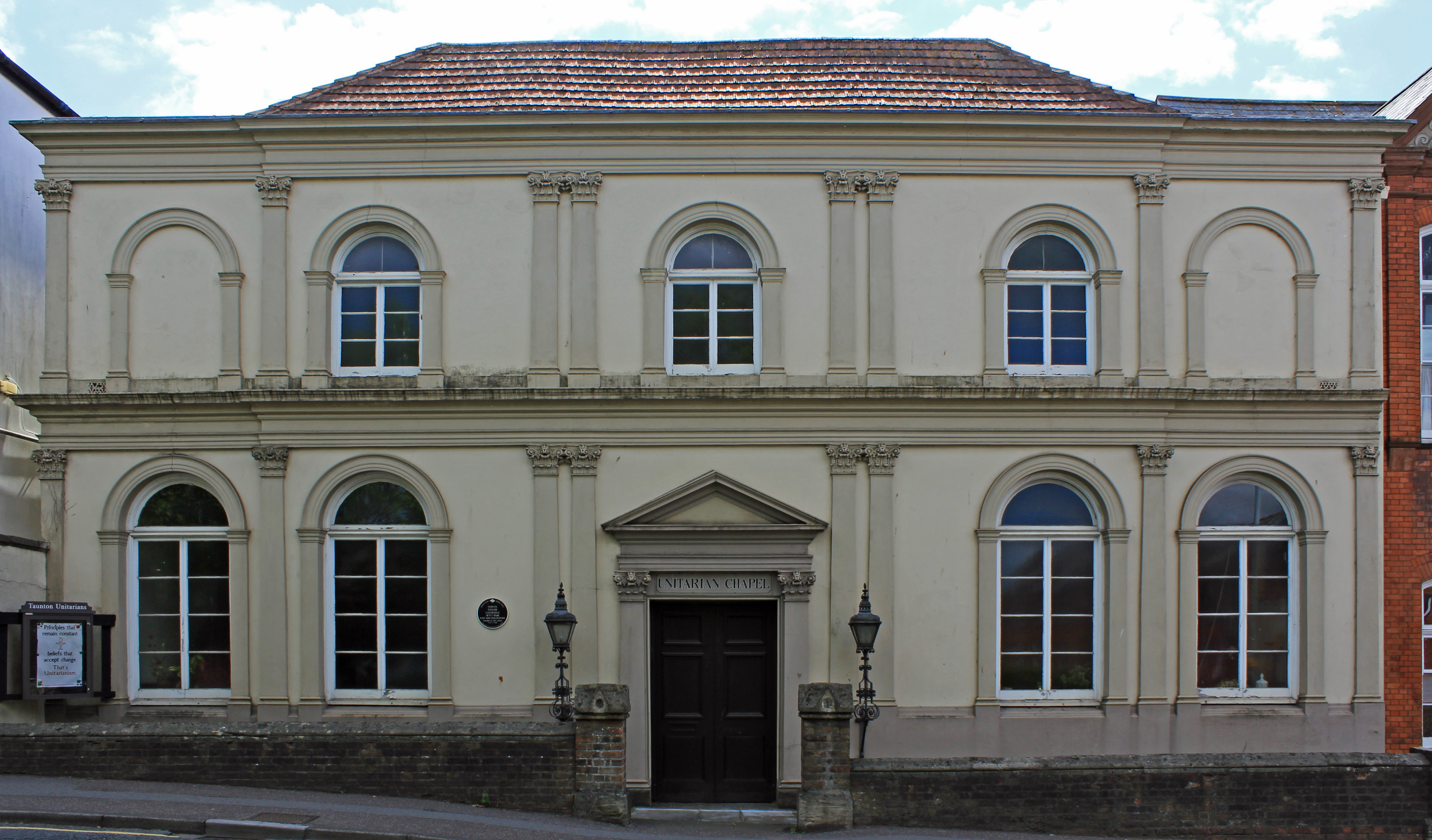

- Location in Somerset
- 51.0122°N 3.1022°W
- Location: Taunton, Somerset
- Country: England
- Denomination: Unitarian
- Previous denomination: Baptist
- Website: www.ukunitarians.org.uk/taunton/

History
- Founded: 1721

Architecture
- Style: Italianate

Listed Building – Grade II*
- Official name: Unitarian Chapel
- Designated: 4 June 1952
- Reference no.: 1060009

Taunton Unitarian Chapel is on Mary Street, Taunton, Somerset, England. It was built in the early 18th century as a Baptist chapel, but later adopted Unitarianism. The exterior was extensively renovated in the 19th century in an Italianate style. The chapel has been designated as a Grade II* listed building.

Despite suffering significant persecution from their peers and the state, Baptists erected their first chapel in Taunton in 1670, on or near the current site. This was replaced in 1712 with the building that still stands today. During the 18th century, probably during the ministry of Joseph Jeffries, the chapel's form of worship became Unitarian, although this was forbidden by Parliament until 1813. The Presbyterians of Taunton merged with the Unitarian church in 1814, and later that century the chapel underwent significant renovation.

In the early 21st century a range of structural and decorative restoration works were carried out on the building, which continues to serve the Taunton congregation, who meet for services twice a month at the chapel.

== History ==
=== Baptist Meeting House ===
After the English Reformation of the 16th century, an increasing number of people were unhappy with the control that the government and monarch had over the Church of England. This led to the formation of independent churches and schools by what are known as Dissenters. The worship of any faith other than Anglicanism was illegal, and those discovered taking part were arrested and even sentenced to death. Oliver Cromwell imposed a period of religious tolerance, but his death precipitated further persecution of Dissenters, principally through the Act of Uniformity 1549, which required the use of the Book of Common Prayer as the only legal form of worship in England. The South West of England in general, and Taunton specifically, had a significant Dissenter population. There was a Baptist community in the town by 1646, and despite continued persecution they erected their first Meeting House in Taunton, on Mary Street in 1670.

The 1672 Royal Declaration of Indulgence was issued by Charles II in an attempt to introduce greater religious freedom, and within Somerset, 82 places applied for licences to meet and worship, 22 of them for Baptists. However, the Declaration was withdrawn at the urging of Parliament the following year. This led to further hostilities toward Dissenters, which were heightened after the failed Monmouth Rebellion, in which a large number of Dissenters fought against the King's forces. After the Glorious Revolution removed James II, his successor William III introduced the Act of Toleration 1689, which specifically allowed nonconformist worship.

By 1721, the Baptist community in Taunton had grown large, and reasonably affluent. They built a new chapel, funded entirely by the congregation, very near to the site of the original Meeting House. The pastor of the church at the time was Joseph Jeffries, and during his ministry the church transitioned from a Baptist church to Unitarianism.

=== Unitarian Chapel ===
In his history of Taunton, Joshua Toulmin suggested that the church adopted Unitarian worship in 1722. This form of worship remained outlawed, as the Act of Toleration did not extend to nontrinitarianism. Unitarianism believed in the "One God and Father of all", rather than the Trinity of God as three consubstantial persons. Writing a series on "Baptists in Taunton" for the Taunton Courier, H. J. Channon disagreed, placing the change in 1733. Both agreed that the zeal with which Jeffries preached helped to swell his congregation, although a history of the Baptist church in Wellington notes that Jeffries was obstructive regarding a Baptist church being built in that town. Toulmin himself served as the pastor of the chapel from 1764 until 1803, during which time he "experienced unremitted insult and misrepresentation." At one time, an effigy was burned at his door, and it was said that Toulmin could have suffered the same fate, but for assistance from his friends. During Toulmin's ministry, the poet Samuel Taylor Coleridge occasionally preached at the chapel while staying at Coleridge Cottage in Nether Stowey. In a letter, Coleridge wrote, "I walked into Taunton (eleven miles) and back again, and performed the divine services for Dr. Toulmin." The Doctrine of the Trinity Act 1813 legalised Unitarian worship.

In 1814, a Calvinistic Baptist group was formed in Taunton, and the following year they built a church on Silver Street. In the same year, the Presbyterians in Taunton found themselves homeless; having previously met in chapels on Paul Street and then Tancred Street, the "ruinous condition" of their meeting house led them to abandon it, and they merged into the Unitarian congregation under the ministry of Henry Davies. Upon this merger, the congregation included "a few of the most influential inhabitants of the town", and the chapel was so full that "children had to sit on the stairs." An organ was added to the chapel in 1826, and at the same time, the building renovated and "beautified" at a cost of £600. The chapel was closed for a few months in 1881, when the building was renovated. At this time, the stucco frontage was added to the building, and a number of internal alterations were made. The building had formerly had two entrance doors, but these were replaced with one central doorway. The Unitarians provided a free school for poor children in Taunton, and were the first in the town to offer this service equally for girls and boys. In 1886, the Mary Street Memorial Schools were built next to the chapel, replacing a smaller school that had previously stood there. The schools, funded by John Collins Odgers were dedicated to the memory of Odgers late wife, and her father, William Arthur Jones, who had been a pastor of the Taunton chapel. The school was run under the care of the trustees of the Unitarian chapel until it was closed in 1933 during a reorganisation of education in Taunton. The school building was also used by the Unitarians for their Sunday school, and as a function hall for lectures and meetings.

The chapel was the subject of one of Sir John Betjemans 'Meeting Point: ABC of Churches' programs in the mid 60's. He showed great enthusiasm for the buildings history and architecture.

The building underwent a series of repairs and redecoration, carried out by the Steel Coleman Davis Partnership in the early 21st century. These included a significant structural repair, as the main supporting roof truss was badly damaged. The frontage was also upgraded to withstand the weathering effects of being north-facing, and the damage caused by being so close to the road. Services continue to be held at the Unitarian Chapel, and as of March 2015, are held twice a month, on the first and third Sundays of each month.

== Architecture ==
The Unitarian Chapel retains much of its original interior, including square Corinthian columns, Oak galleries and a carved wooden pulpit. A large brass chandelier was donated to the chapel later in the 18th century by Nathaniel Webb, one the town's members of parliament. In 1881, the building's frontage was decorated with stucco to an Italianate style. Each floor is split by a number of Corinthian pilasters, and the doorway is framed by two pairs of similar identical pilasters, and topped by a triangular pediment. On the ground floor, there are four round-headed windows, while the first floor has five round-headed window bays, though the outer pairs are blocked. It was designated as a Grade II* listed building in 1952.
