= Church of St. James, Taunton =

Coordinates: 51.018°N 3.101°W

Church of St James
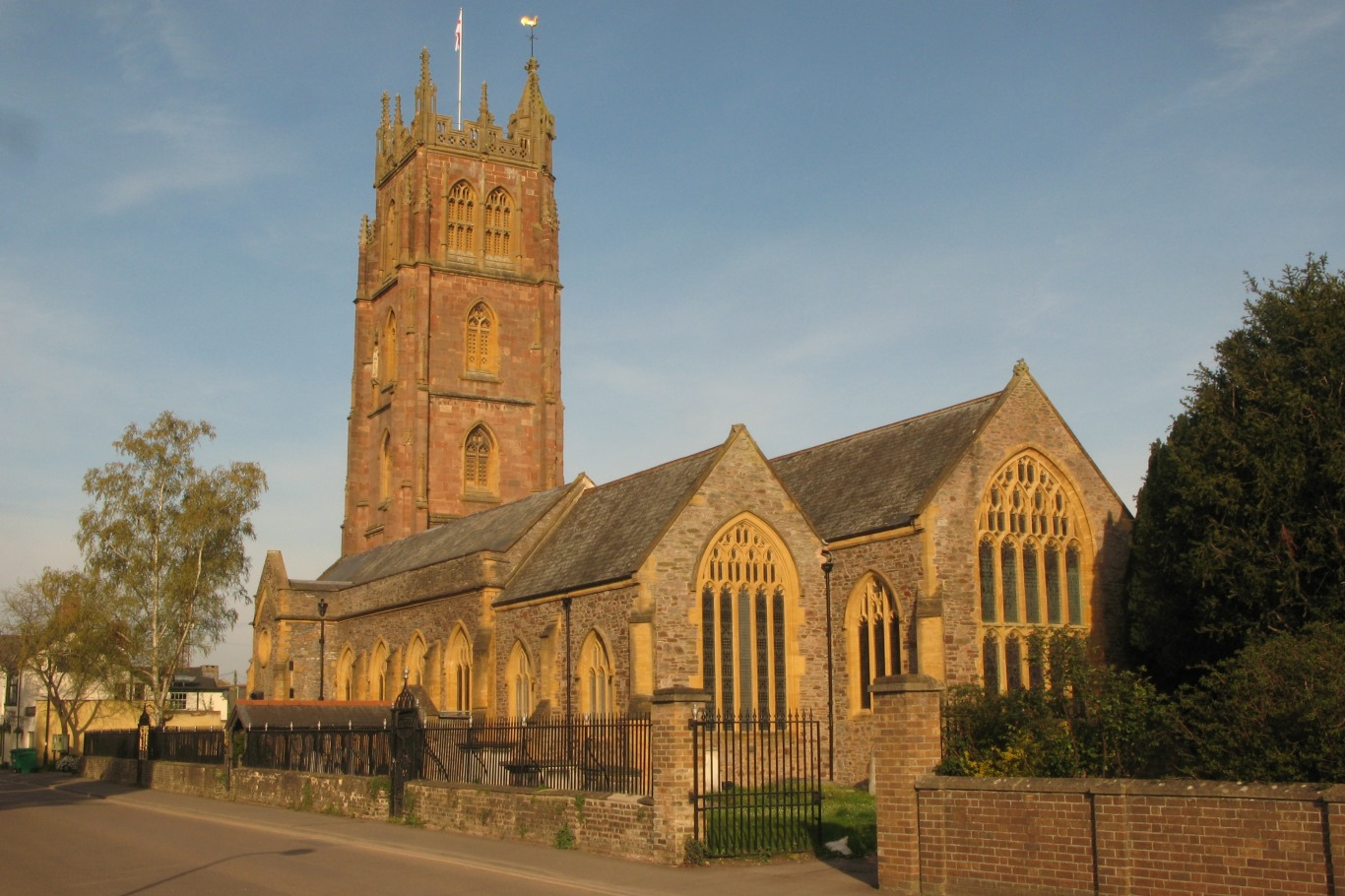

- Location in Somerset
- Location: Taunton
- Country: England
- Denomination: Church of England
- Churchmanship: Low church/evangelical
- Website: stjamestaunton.org

History
- Status: Church
- Founded: c. 1169
- Dedication: Saint James the Greater

Specifications
- Height: 111 feet (34 m)
- Materials: Red sandstone

The Church of St James is a Church of England parish church in Taunton, Somerset, England. It dates from the early 14th century, although an earlier church, associated with Taunton Priory, was located on the same site in the 10th century. The church is dedicated to St. James the Greater. It is a Grade II* listed building.

== History ==
The waggon roof above the nave and north aisle is medieval. The south aisle and the south porch were rebuilt between 1836 and 1837, with the 111 feet (34 m) west tower following in the 1870s and the chancel being rebuilt in 1884. The font dates from the 15th century and the pulpit from 1633. There are fragments of 15th century stained glass in the West end. Other stained glass is from Clayton and Bell in the 19th century.

The iron railings around the churchyard are from the early 19th century.

The church backs onto the Somerset County Ground and forms a familiar backdrop to the cricket ground.

=== Present day ===
The parish is part of Diocese of Bath and Wells. It stands in the evangelical tradition of the Church of England.

== Gallery ==
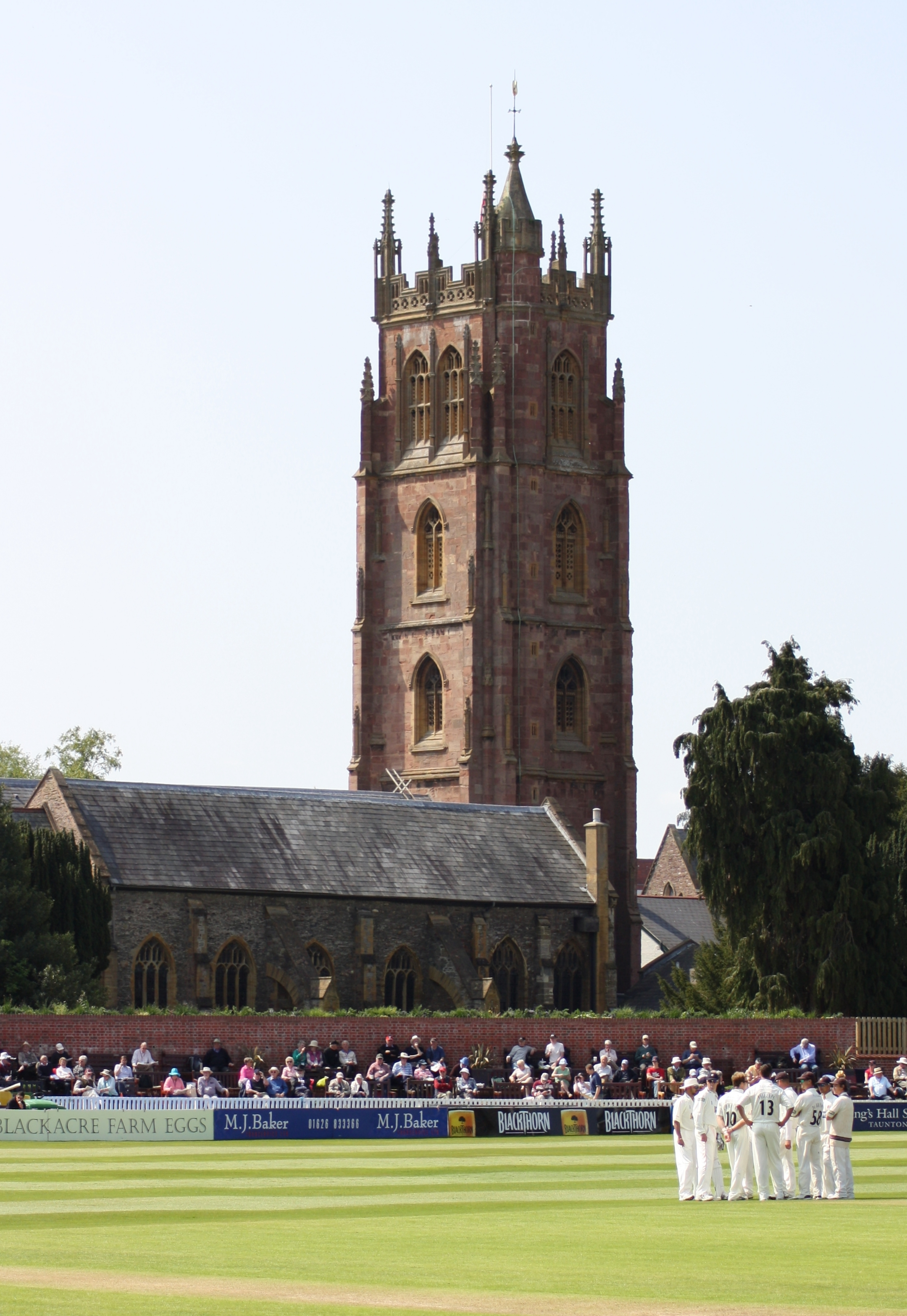
View of the church across the cricket ground

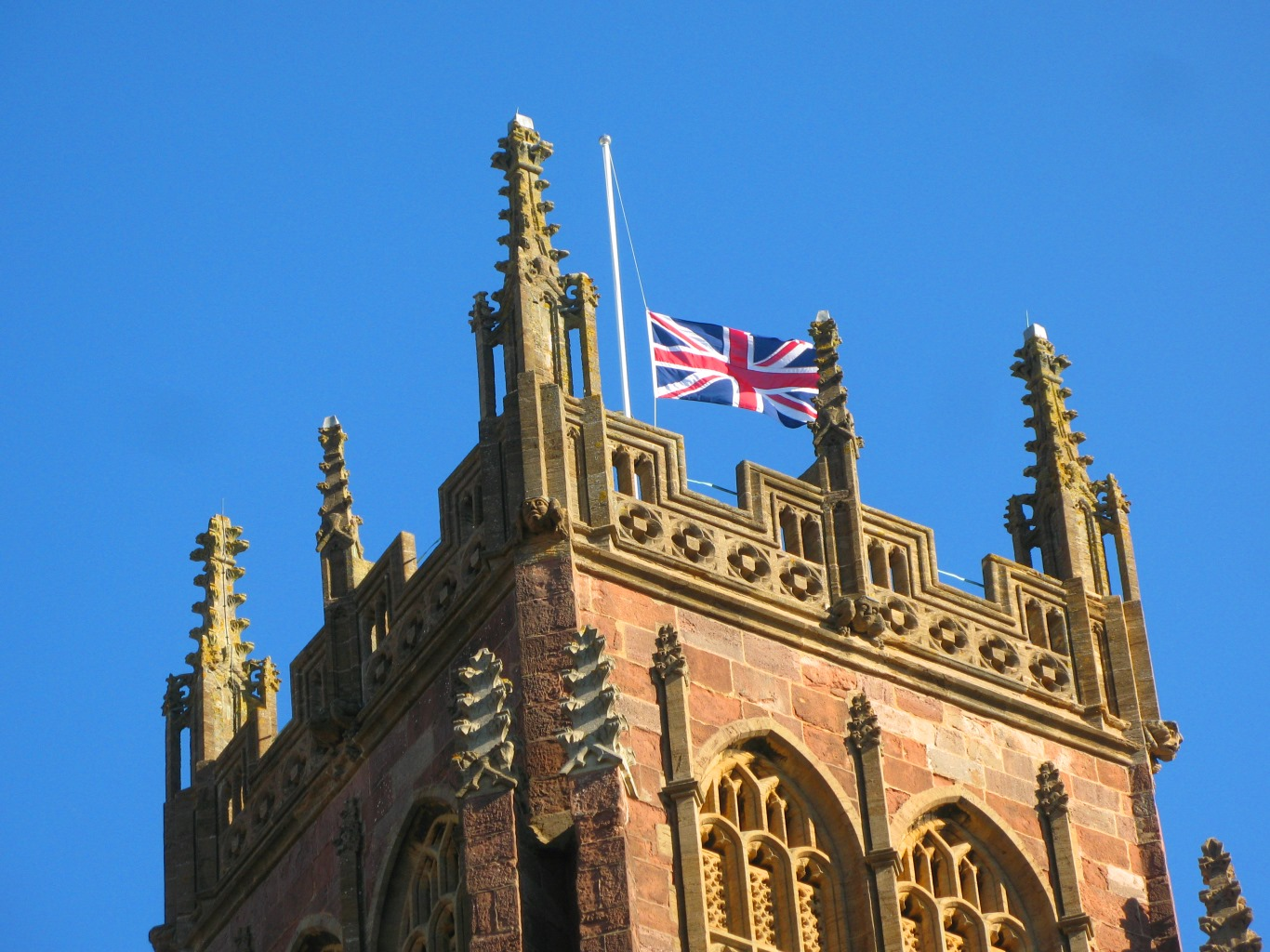
Top of the church's tower

== See also ==
- List of towers in Somerset
- List of ecclesiastical parishes in the Diocese of Bath and Wells
