= Hammet Street, Taunton =

Street in Taunton, Somerset, England

Hammet Street
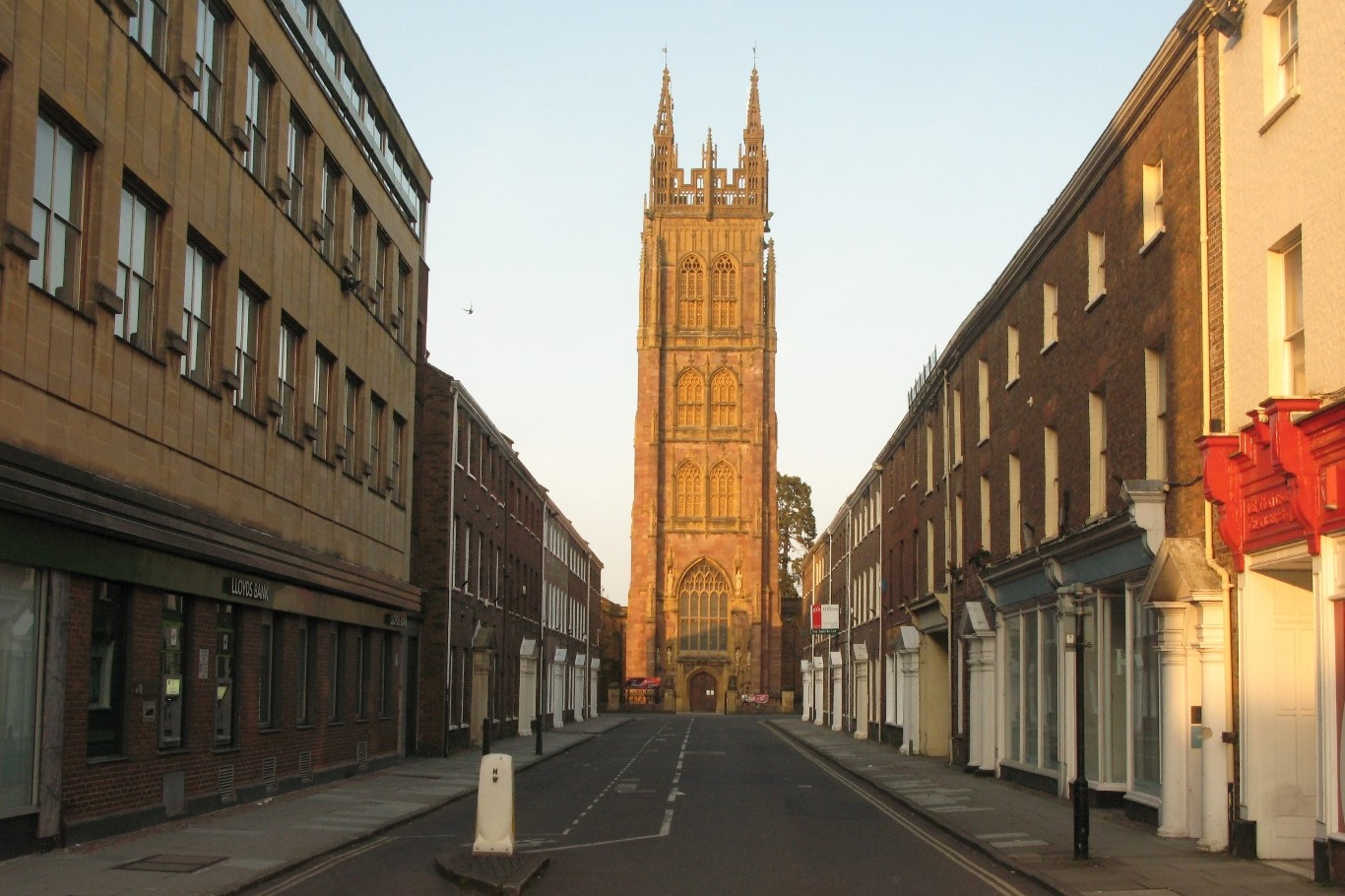
- Hammet Street, with the Church of St Mary Magdalene in the background.
- Length: 128 m (420 ft)
- Location: Taunton, Somerset
- Postal code: TA1 1RZ
- Coordinates: 51.0153°N 3.1019°W
- East end: Church Square
- West end: Fore Street, North Street

Construction
- Construction start: 1788
- Completion: 1790

Hammet Street is a street in Taunton, Somerset, England, that runs between the Church of St Mary Magdalene and the town centre. It is named after Sir Benjamin Hammet, who had a bill passed through parliament to allow him to build the street in 1788. The street includes four listed buildings: numbers 4 and 5–8, 9–12, 13–17, and number 18 with 33 Fore Street. The first three buildings are grade II* listed, while the last is grade II listed, and together with the Church of St Mary Magdalene and the listed buildings in Church Square, the English Heritage consider them to "form an extremely important group."

== History ==
Sir Benjamin Hammet was born in Taunton around 1736, and was a Member of Parliament for the town from 1782 until his death in 1800. In the late 1780s, a number of Acts of Parliament were passed to make improvement to town and city centres, and Hammet carried such an Improvement Act for Taunton through in 1788. The Act allowed Hammet to purchase two houses on Fore Street, one occupied and the other empty, and demolish them to make way for the new road. The road built ran directly towards the Church of St Mary Magdalene, which had previously been accessible only via a narrow lane. Hammet Street is 36 feet (11 m) wide at its narrowest point, designed to allow carriages to travel to the church without endangering pedestrians. In his history of Taunton, Joshua Toulmin describes the terraces along Hammet Street as "handsome houses", and praises the way the street opened up the view of the church from the town centre. The original houses remain, and the ground floors of many are currently used as estate agents.

== Listed buildings ==
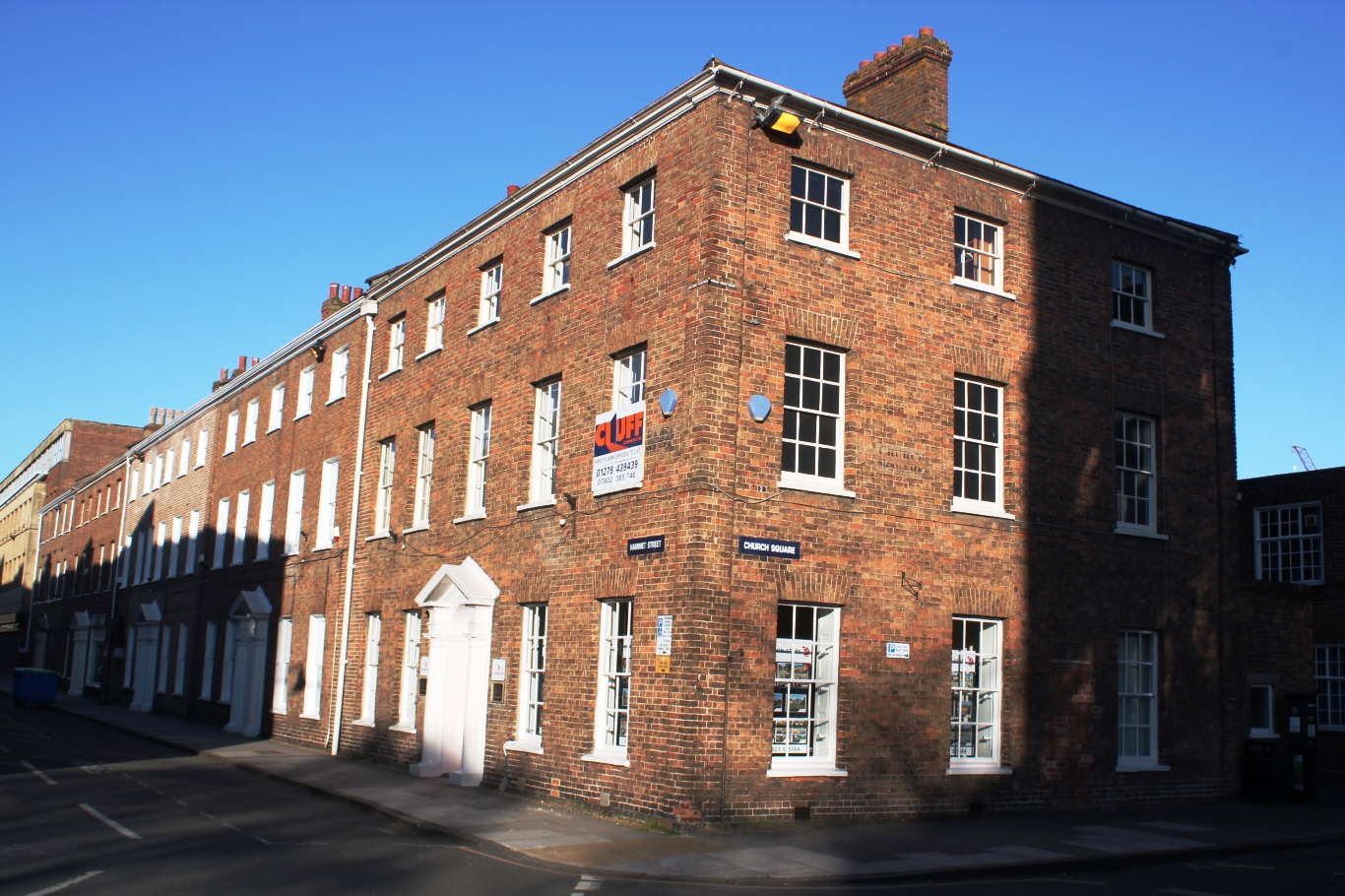
Number 8 with 4–7 to the left

Hammet Street has four listed building entries. On the north side, numbers 4–8 make up one entry, while on the south side, numbers 9–12 are considered one entry, number 13–17 another, and number 18 forms a separate entry, along with number 33 Fore Street. Both sides of the road are of similar design, consisting of the original eighteenth century three-storey terraces of brown brick, with each house separated by plain pilasters, and continuous eaves cornice. Each property has five sash windows in plain reveals. The roofs are a mix of tile and slate, and retain the original rainwater pipes. The door-cases of numbers 4–8 and 9–12 are of painted stone, with "half round Tuscan pilasters, open pediments and traceried fanlights." Numbers 13 and 17 have similar door-cases, but with semi-circular rather than traceried fanlights. The majority of the doors have six panels, but numbers 8 and 9 have four, and number 10 has no panels. There is an archway between numbers 5 and 6. Numbers 5 and 9 have modern shop windows on the ground floor. The east side of number 8 and 9 form the side of Church Square, and each have three windows facing into the square. The entry for numbers 13–17 notes that those properties have been "considerably altered, especially on the ground floor," and have shop fronts dating from no later than the nineteenth century. Number 18 is significantly different from the other listed buildings, having been colour washed, and the part of the building facing into Fore Street has been elevated.
