= Town hall =

Chief administrative building of a municipality

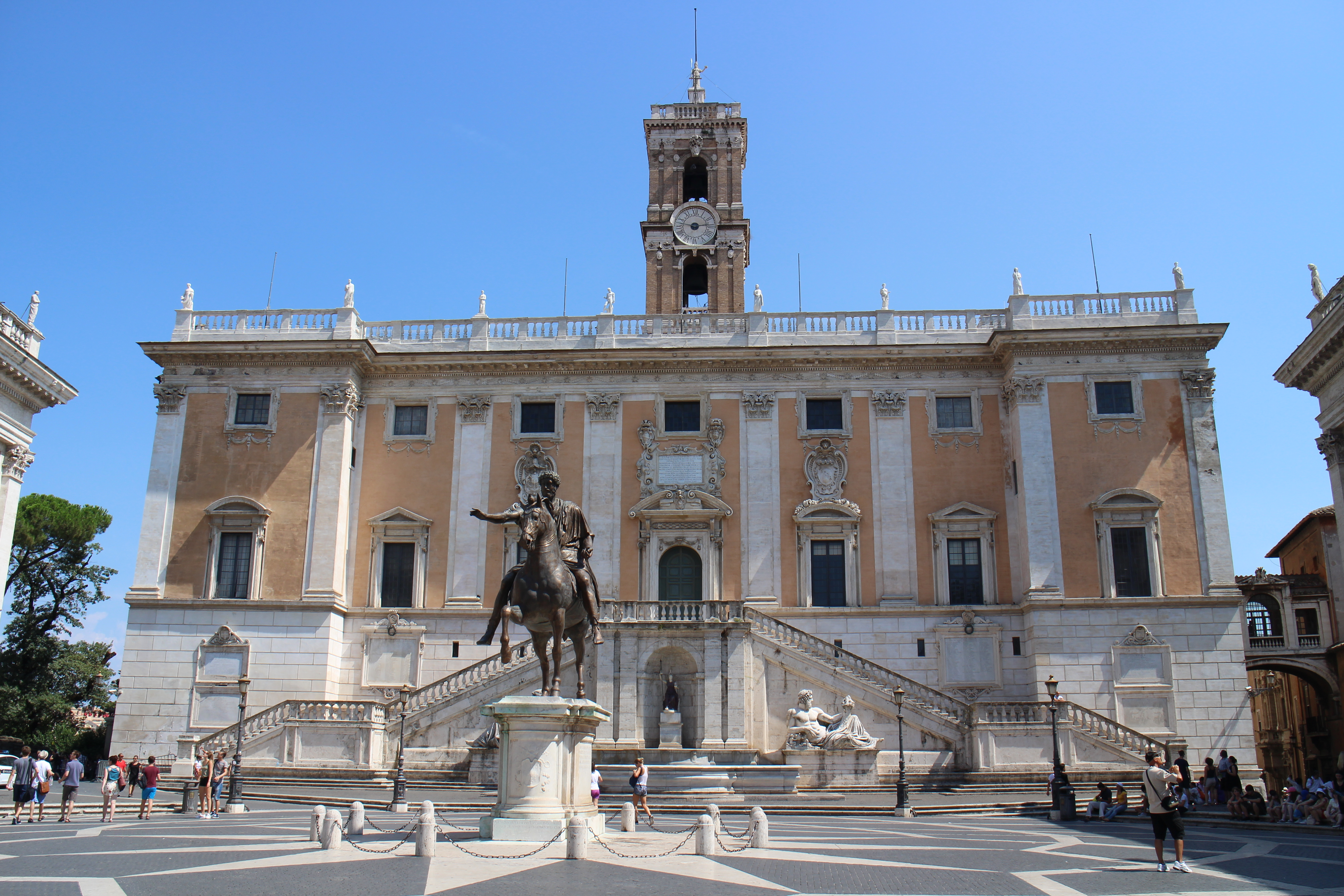
Palazzo Senatorio, seat of the municipality of Rome, Italy. It has been a town hall since 1144, making it the oldest town hall in the world.

In local government, a city hall, town hall, civic centre (in the UK or Australia), guildhall, or municipal hall (in the Philippines) is the chief administrative building of a city, town, or other municipality. It usually houses the city or town council and at least some other arms of the local government. It also often functions as the office of the mayor (or other executive), if the relevant municipality has such an officer. In large cities, the local government is often administratively expansive, and the city hall may bear more resemblance to a municipal parliament.

By convention, until the middle of the 19th century, a single large, open chamber (or "hall") formed an integral part of the building housing the council and other organs of government that supported it. The hall may be used for council meetings and other significant events. This large chamber, known as the "town hall" (and its later variant, "city hall"), became synonymous with the entire building, and, synecdochically, with the municipal government headquartered there. The terms "council chambers", "municipal building", or variants may be used locally in preference to "town hall" if no such large hall is present within the building.

The local government may endeavor to use the building to promote and enhance the quality of life of the community. In many cases, "town halls" serve not only as buildings for government functions, but also have facilities for various civic and cultural activities. These may include art shows, stage performances, exhibits, and festivals. Modern town halls or "civic centres" are often designed with a great variety and flexibility of purpose in mind.

As symbols of local government, city and town halls have distinctive architecture, and the buildings may have great historical significance – for example, the Guildhall in London. City hall buildings may also serve as cultural icons that symbolize their cities. The premises often serve citizens in accessing government functions as well as providing vital symbolic roles for their communities.

== Nomenclature ==
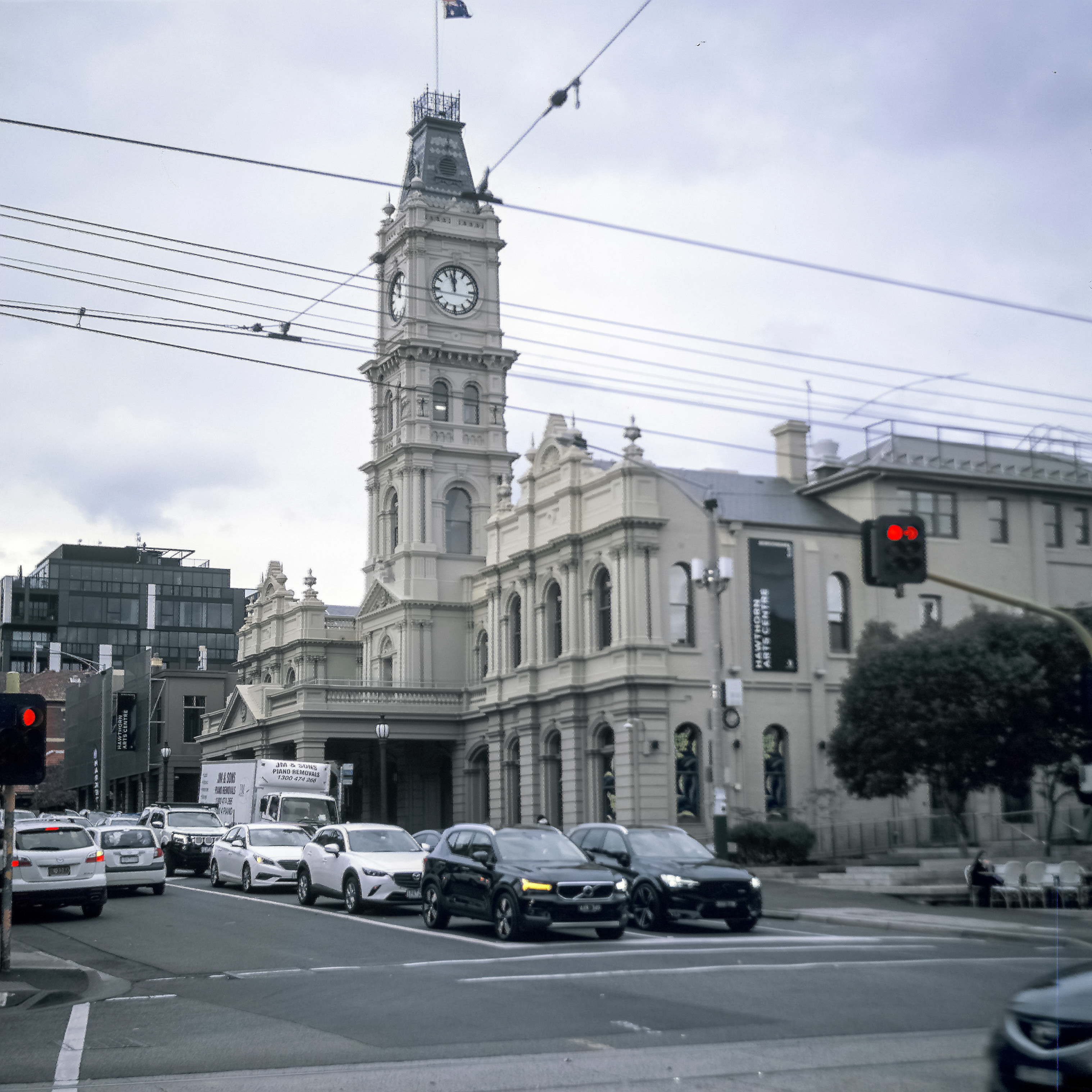
Hawthorn Town Hall in Victoria, Australia

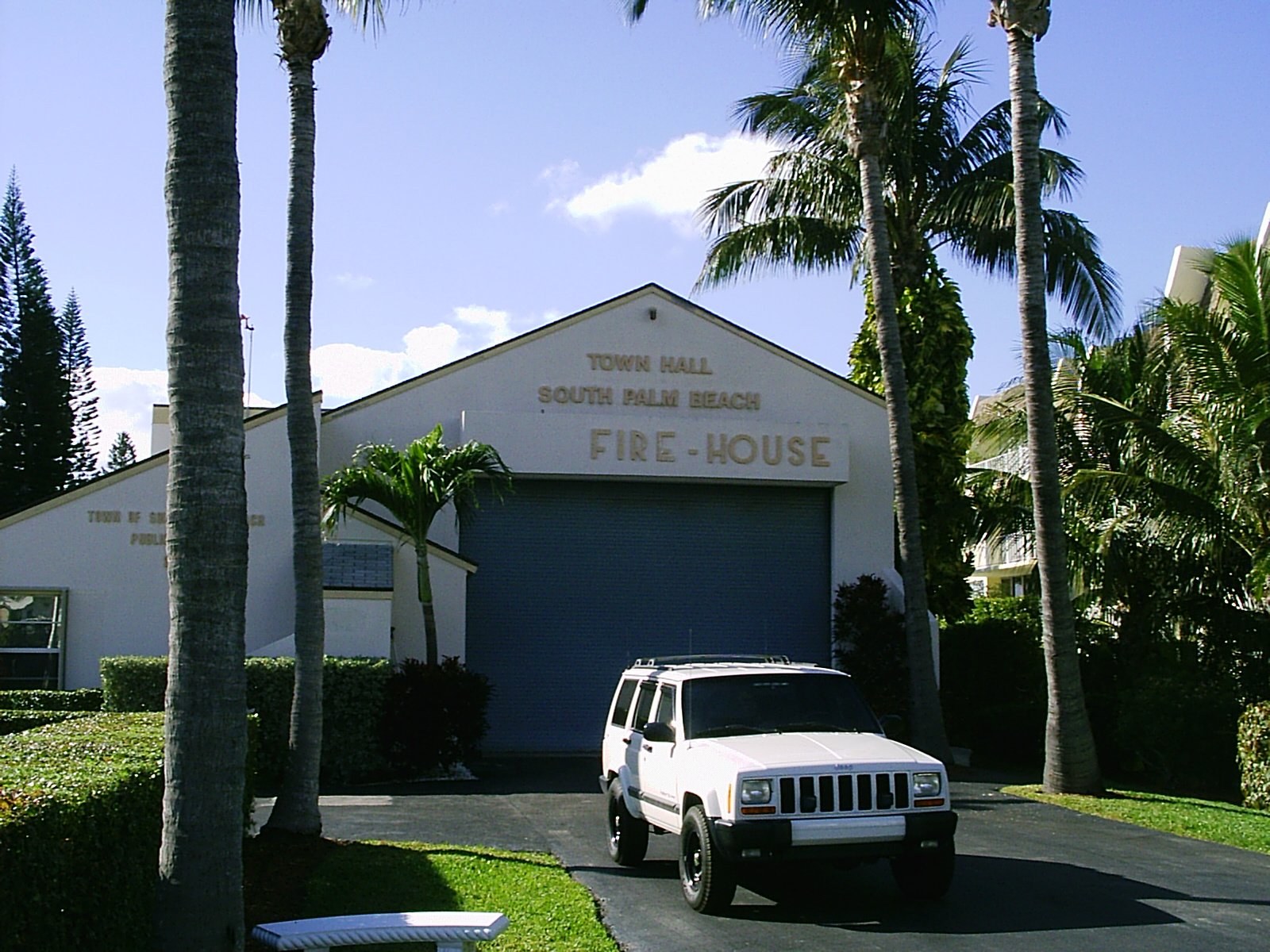
A consolidated town hall, police, and fire station in South Palm Beach, Florida

In Commonwealth countries, the term "town hall" may be used even in a city. This is often the case in the United Kingdom (examples being Manchester Town Hall and Liverpool Town Hall), Australia (Sydney Town Hall), New Zealand, and elsewhere.

People in some regions use the term "city hall" to designate the council offices of a municipality of city status. This is the case in North America, where a distinction is made between city halls and town halls. The term is also sometimes (but more rarely) used as a name in Commonwealth countries: for example, for the City Halls of Brisbane in Australia, and of Cardiff, Norwich and Bristol in the UK. City Hall in Dublin, Ireland, is another example. City Hall in London, opened in 2002, is an exceptional case, being the seat not of a conventional municipal authority, but of a regional strategic authority.

The Oxford English Dictionary sums up the generic terms:

- town hall: "A building used for the administration of local government, the holding of court sessions, public meetings, entertainments, etc.; (in early use also) a large hall used for such purposes within a larger building or set of buildings. ... By metonymy: the government or administration of a town; the town authorities."
- city hall: "(The name of) the chief administrative building or offices of a municipal government. ... Originally and chiefly North American. Municipal officers collectively; city government."

County Council administrations in parts of England and Wales generally operate from a base in a building called, by analogy, a "county hall" or "shire hall". Conversely, cities that have subdivisions with their councils may have borough halls. Scottish local government in larger cities operate from the "City Chambers".

Other names are occasionally used. The administrative headquarters of the City of London retains its Anglo-Saxon name, the Guildhall, signifying a place where taxes were paid. In a few English cities (including Birmingham, Coventry and Nottingham) the preferred term is "Council House": this was also true in Bristol until 2012, when the building was renamed "City Hall". In Birmingham, there is a distinction between the Council House and the Town Hall, a concert and meeting venue that pre-dates it. In Sheffield, the distinction is between the Town Hall, the seat of local government, and the City Hall, a concert and ballroom venue. In Leeds, the Town Hall, built in the 1850s as a seat of local government, now functions primarily as a concert, conference, and wedding venue, many of its municipal functions having moved in 1933 to the new Civic Hall.

== History ==
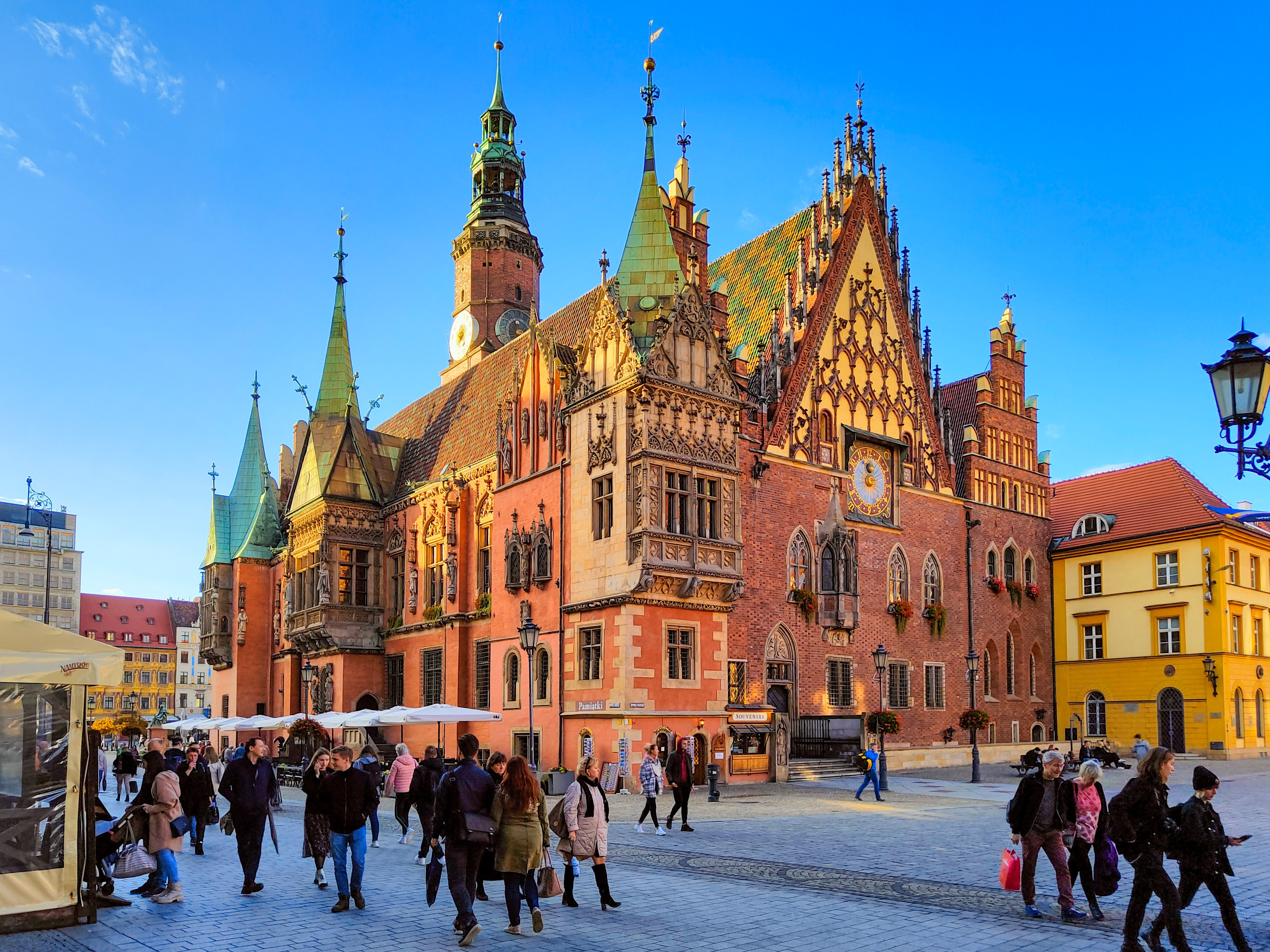
13th-century Old Town Hall in Wrocław, Poland

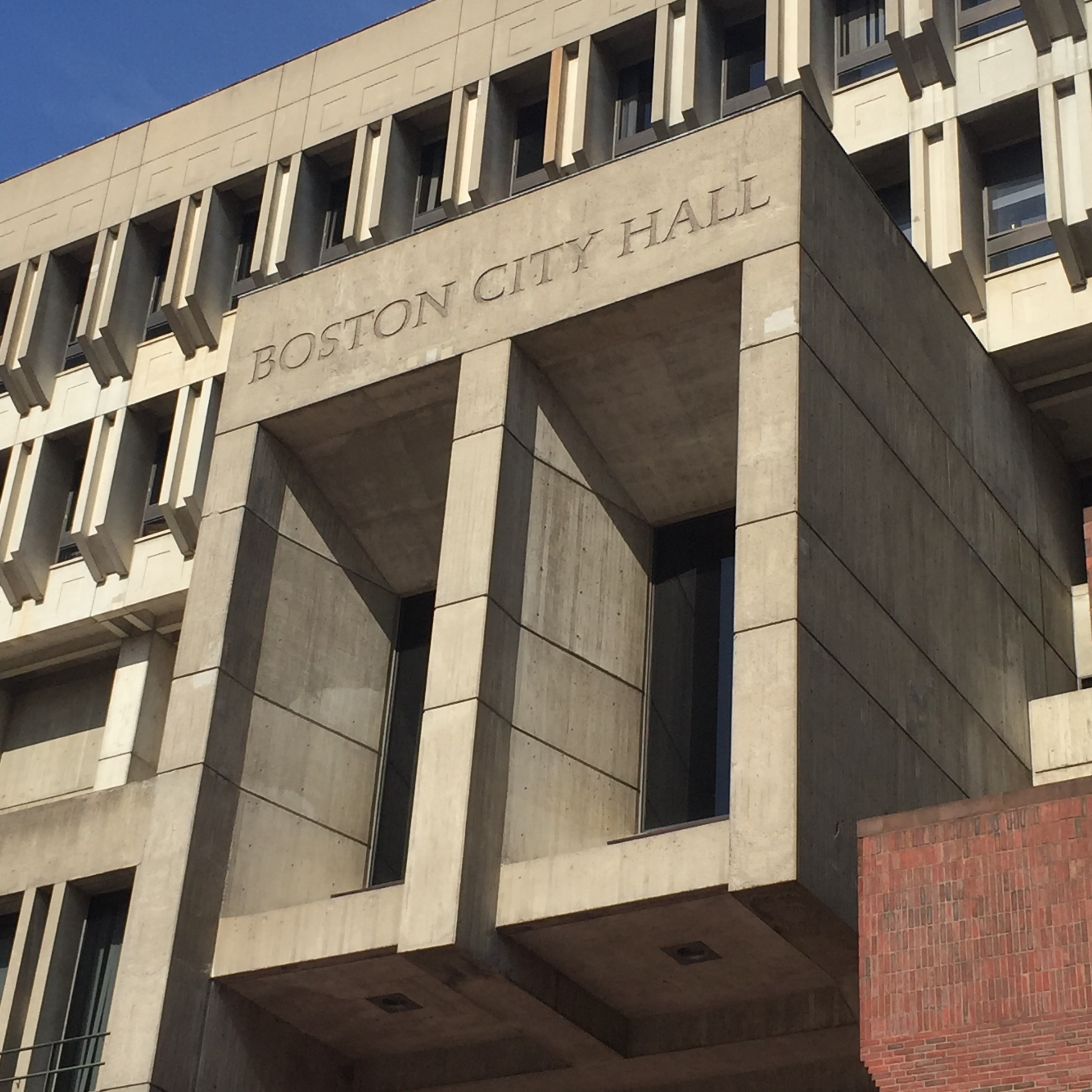
Boston City Hall has a Government Center station entrance

The development of the town hall as a setting for local governance meetings and decisions is historically related to the early cities in medieval Europe. The objective was to have engagement with the citizens in a public space by a representative civic authority. The oldest town hall in the world is Palazzo Senatorio in Rome, Italy, which is established in AD 1144. The town hall concept of democracy was developed prolifically in northern Italy where several merchant cities entered into the allegiance of the Lombard League.

In the later Middle Ages or early modern period, many European market towns erected communal market halls, comprising a covered space to function as a marketplace at street level, and one or more rooms used for public or civic purposes above it. These buildings were frequently the precursors of dedicated town halls. The modern concept of the town hall developed with the rise of medieval communes. Much as a lord was based in his hall, the new councils which formed to rule the cities required a headquarters. This building needed a debating chamber for council meetings, office space for city employees, an archive room for official documents, and some degree of fortification lest the city be attacked.

The Palazzo Senatorio has been the headquarters of the municipal government of Rome since 1144, making it the oldest city hall in the world. The Cologne City Hall of 1135 is another early example. The Palazzo Pubblico of the Republic of Siena and the Palazzo Vecchio of the Republic of Florence, both late-medieval town halls, date from 1297 and 1299 respectively. In each case, the large, fortified building comprises a large meeting hall and numerous administrative chambers. Both buildings are topped by tall towers, have ancient clocks against which townsfolk measured time, and have space for local archives of official documents. These features became standard for town halls across Europe. The 15th-century Brussels Town Hall, with its 96-meter (315 ft) tower, is one of the grandest examples of the medieval era, serving as a model for 19th-century town halls such as the Rathaus, Vienna. One of the largest town halls in the world in terms of space is the New Town Hall in Leipzig.

Over centuries, the idea of civic representation along with notions of urbanism and public space evolved. Even the building form grew in size and the town hall concept expanded beyond Europe to become an established institution across the world.

== Municipal government ==
As the functions of government generally and municipal government in particular expanded in the 19th and 20th centuries, the role of town and city halls became broader. Many cities established a reading room in their city hall, which later grew into a public library, typically in its own building. The central room in a town hall (the "hall" proper) began to be used for a variety of other functions; some cities installed a large pipe organ to facilitate public entertainment.

In the 20th century, the town hall served the public as place for voting, examinations, vaccinations, disaster relief, and disseminating information through noticeboards, as well as for the more usual civil work, festivities, and entertainments. Local councils have increasingly moved administrative functions into modern office buildings. New premises are designed and constructed to separately house local government, the functions of administrative office, and the civic town hall.

== Language ==
Particularly in North America, "city hall" can be used as a metonym to mean municipal government, or government in general, as in the saying "You can't fight city hall". "Town hall" tends to have less formal connotations (cf. town meeting).

== See also ==
- List of city and town halls
- Barangay hall
- Market hall
- Moot hall
- Town meeting
- Administrative centre
