= Vincent Harris =

English architect (1876–1971)

E Vincent Harris OBE RA
- Vincent Harris
- Born: 26 June 1876; Devonport, England
- Died: 1 August 1971 (aged 95); Bath, England
- Occupation: Architect
- Buildings: Manchester Central Library (1934); Sheffield City Hall (1932); Leeds Civic Hall (1933)
- Projects: Manchester Town Hall Extension (1938)

Emanuel Vincent Harris OBE RA (26 June 1876 – 1 August 1971), often known as E. Vincent Harris, was an English architect who designed several important public buildings in traditional styles.

== Early life ==
He was born in Devonport, Devon, and educated at Kingsbridge Grammar School. He was articled to the Plymouth architect James Harvey in 1893; in 1897 he moved to London, where he assisted E. Keynes Purchase, Leonard Stokes and Sir William Emerson. From 1901 to 1907 he worked for the London County Council before setting up in private practice.

He was appointed an Officer of the Order of the British Empire (OBE) in the 1919 Birthday Honours.

== Work ==
He was primarily a classicist; A. Stuart Gray wrote: "Some of his buildings suggest the influence of Sir Edwin Lutyens, but are bolder, balder, and less subtle or more frank depending on one's point of view." His work was often criticised by modernist architects. In his acceptance speech when he was awarded the RIBA Royal Gold Medal in 1951 Harris is reported to have said: "Look, a lot of you here tonight don't like what I do and I don't like what a lot of you do ...".

He became an Associate of the Royal Academy in 1942. He died in Bath in 1971 and is buried in the village of Chaffcombe, Somerset.

== Important works ==
- University of Exeter Streatham Campus: site plan; Washington Singer Building (1931); Mardon Hall (1933); Roborough Library (1938); Mary Harris Memorial Chapel of the Holy Trinity (1958)
- Board of Trade, Whitehall, London (competition 1914)
- Glamorgan County Hall, Cardiff (competition 1908 – opened 1912)
- Central Fire Station, Cardiff, (completed 1913 – demolished 1973)
- Duke Street art gallery, London (1910–1912)
- Sheffield City Hall (competition 1920 – opened 1932)
- Nottingham County Hall (competition 1925 – construction 1939–1954)
- Atkinsons Building, Old Bond Street, London (1926)
- Braintree Town Hall 1928
- Leeds Civic Hall (competition 1926 – built 1931–1933)
- Manchester Central Library (competition 1927 – built 1930–1934)
- Sugworth Hall, Sheffield, (Tower and battlements) c.1930
- Somerset County Hall, Taunton (1932)
- Manchester Town Hall Extension (competition 1927 – built 1934–1938)
- County Hall, Chelmsford (Council chamber & foyer)
- Bristol Council House (1938–1956) (Renamed City Hall in November 2012)
- Ministry of Defence Main Building (1938–1959)
- Fergusson building, St Mary's College, Durham (1950s)
- Mary Harris Memorial Chapel of the Holy Trinity, University of Exeter (1956–1958)
- Kensington Central Library, Kensington, London (1958–1960)

== Gallery of works ==
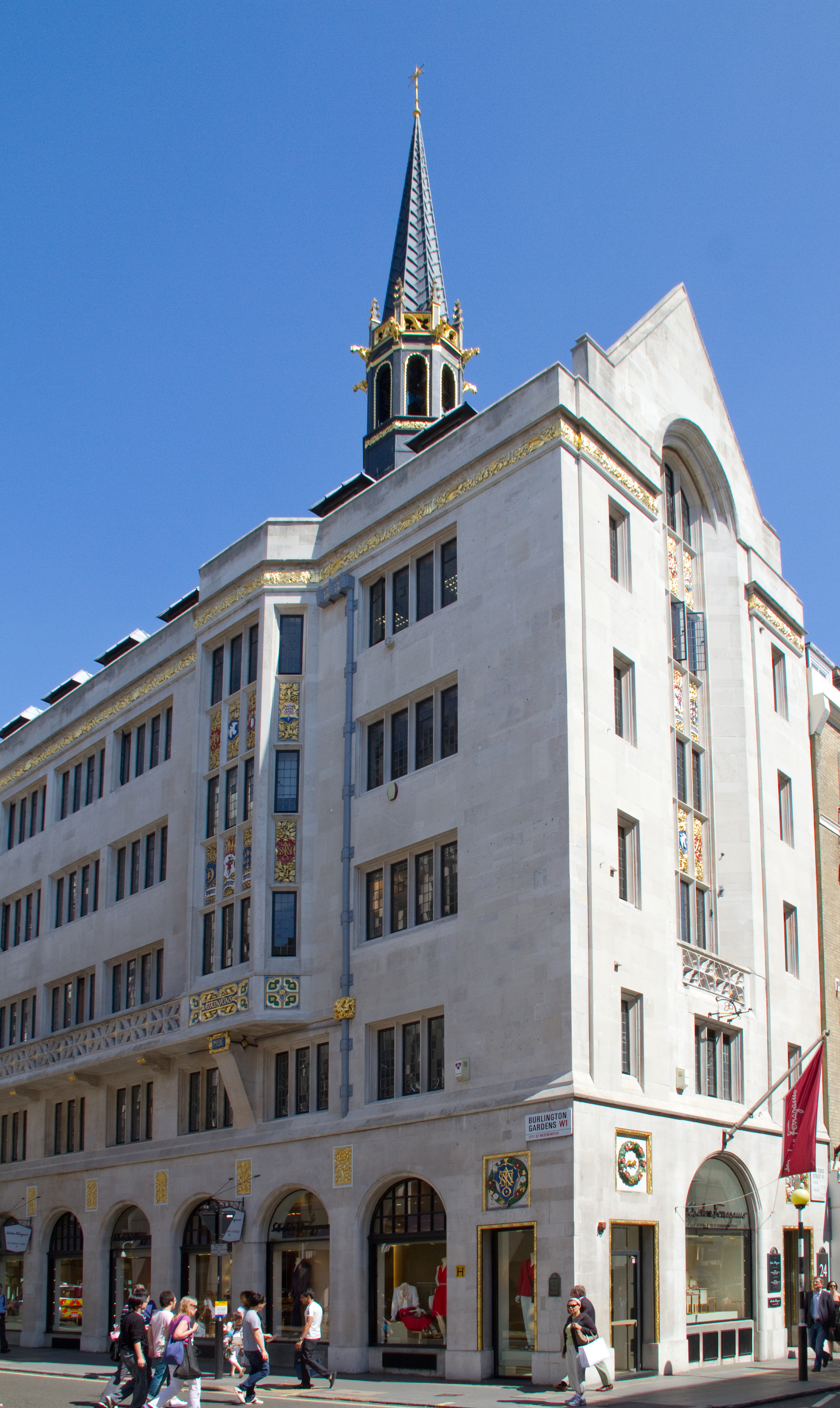
Atkinsons Building, London (1926)

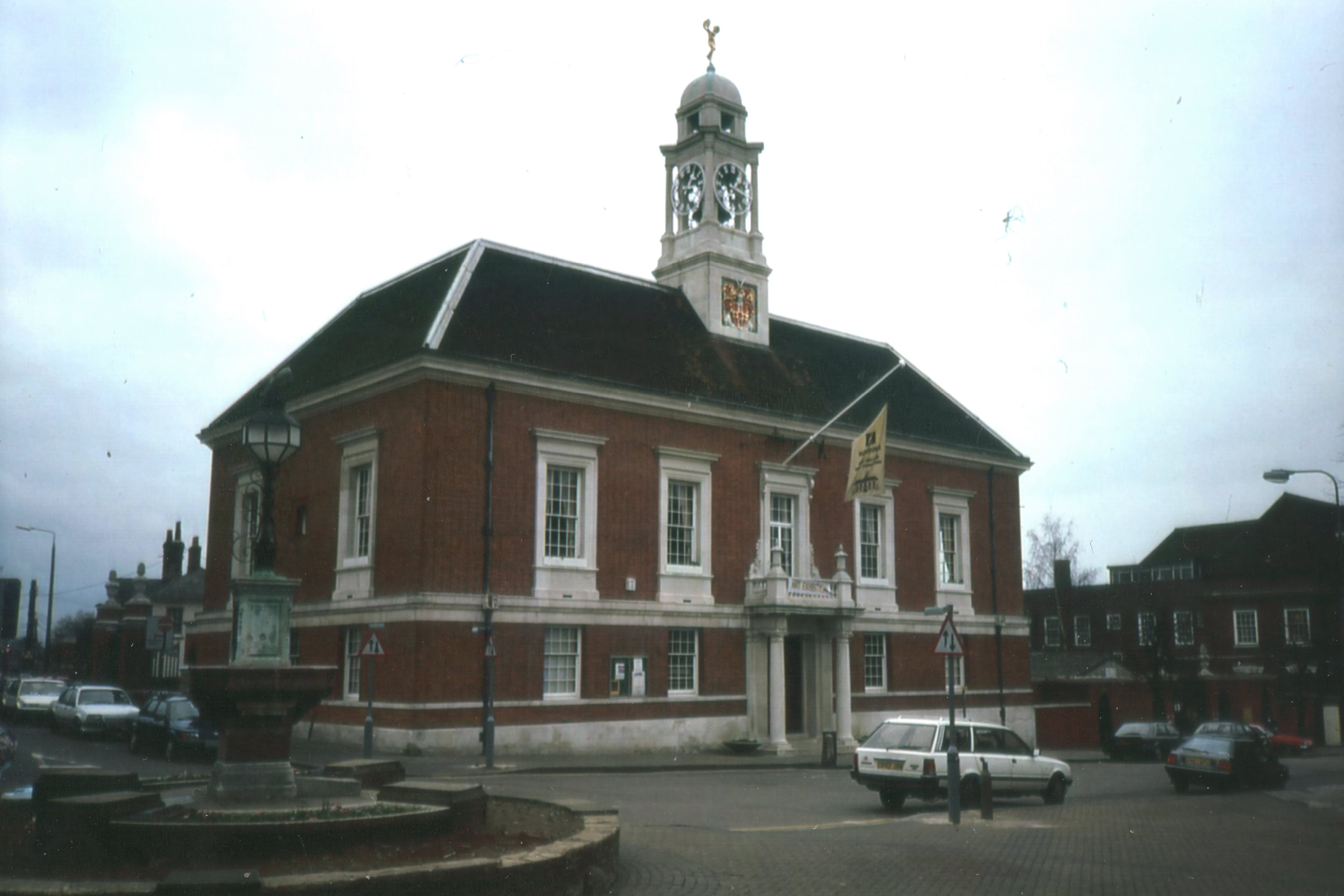
Braintree Town Hall (1928)

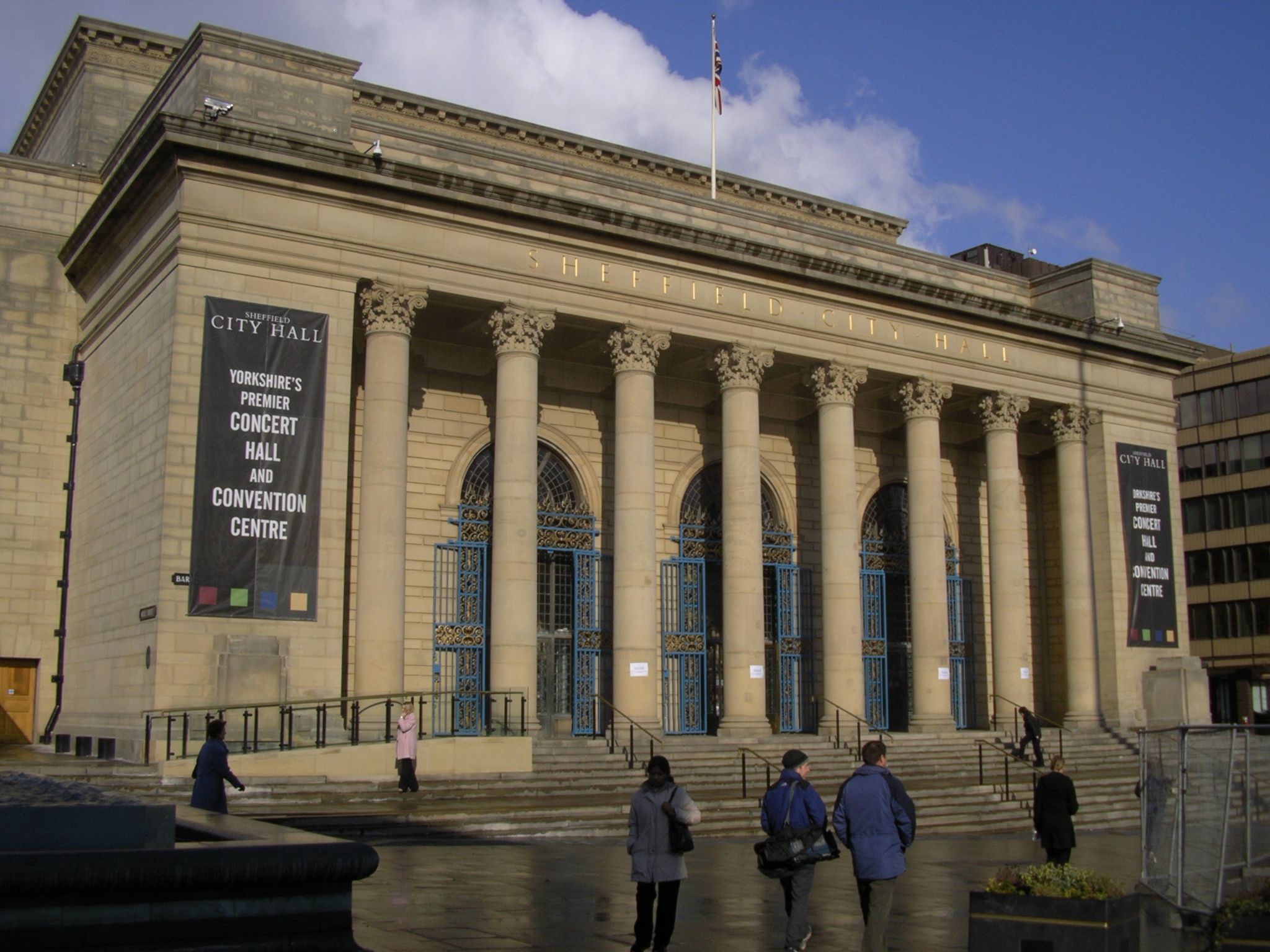
Sheffield City Hall (1920–1934)

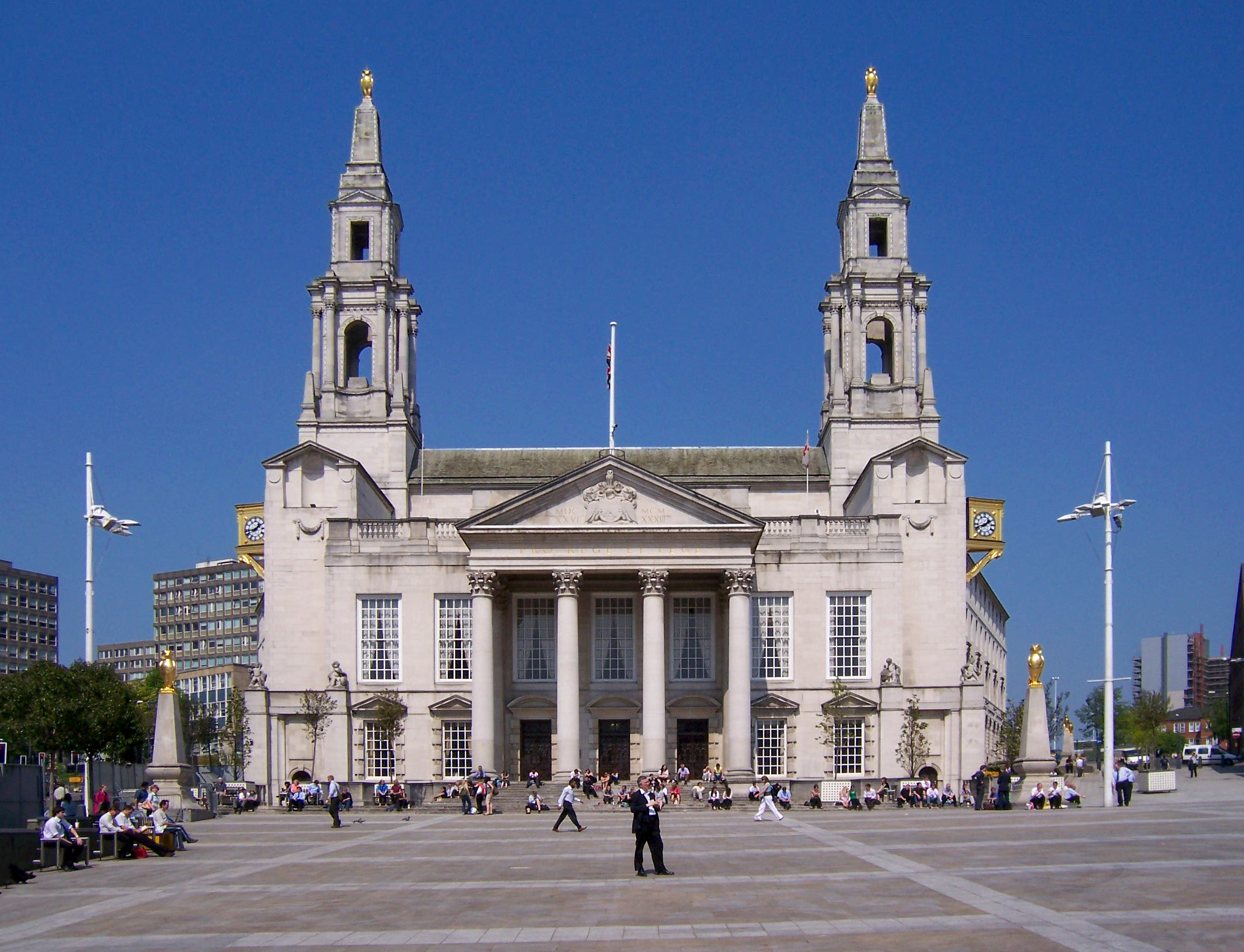
Leeds Civic Hall (1931–1933)

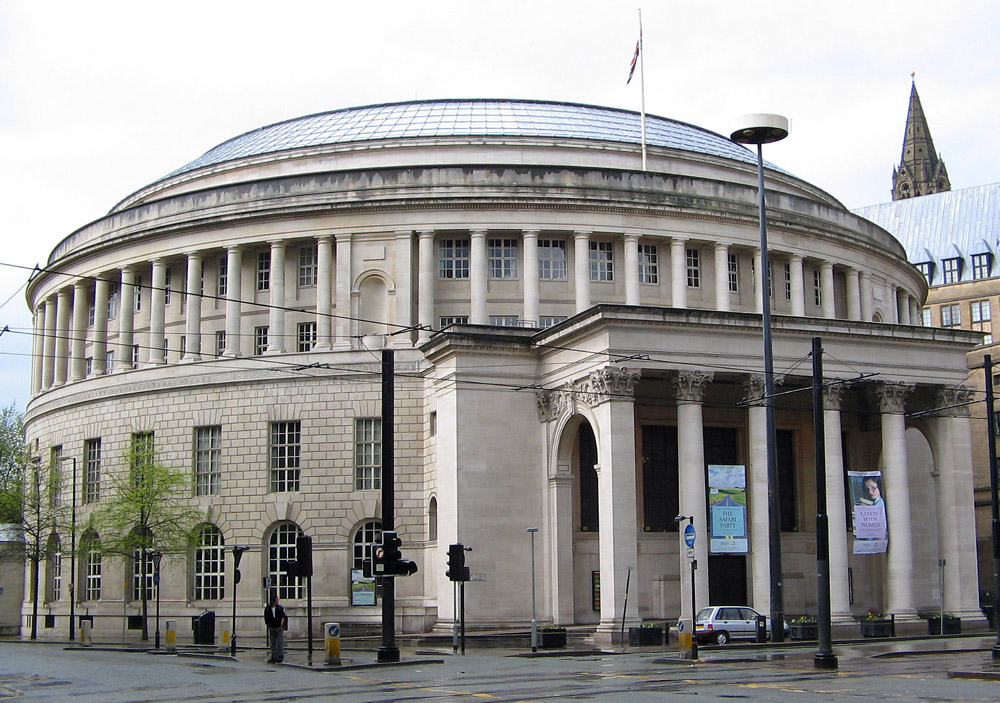
Manchester Central Library (1930–1934)

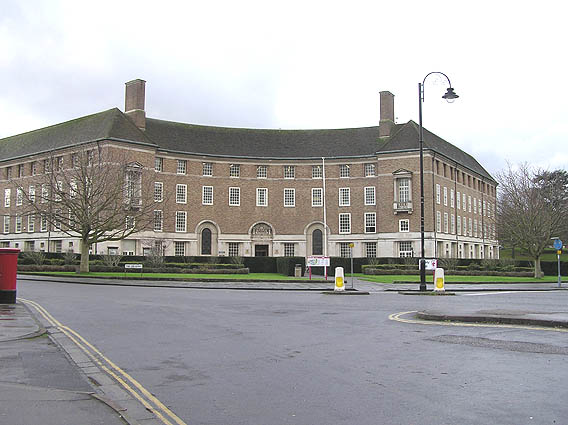
County Hall, Taunton (1935)

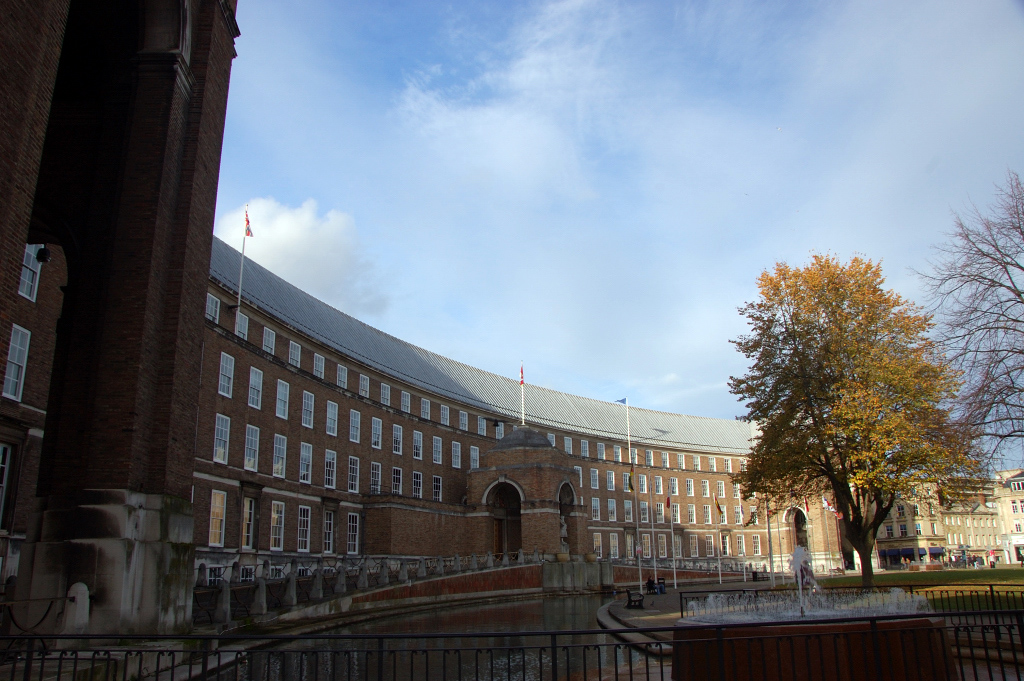
Council House, Bristol (1938–1956)

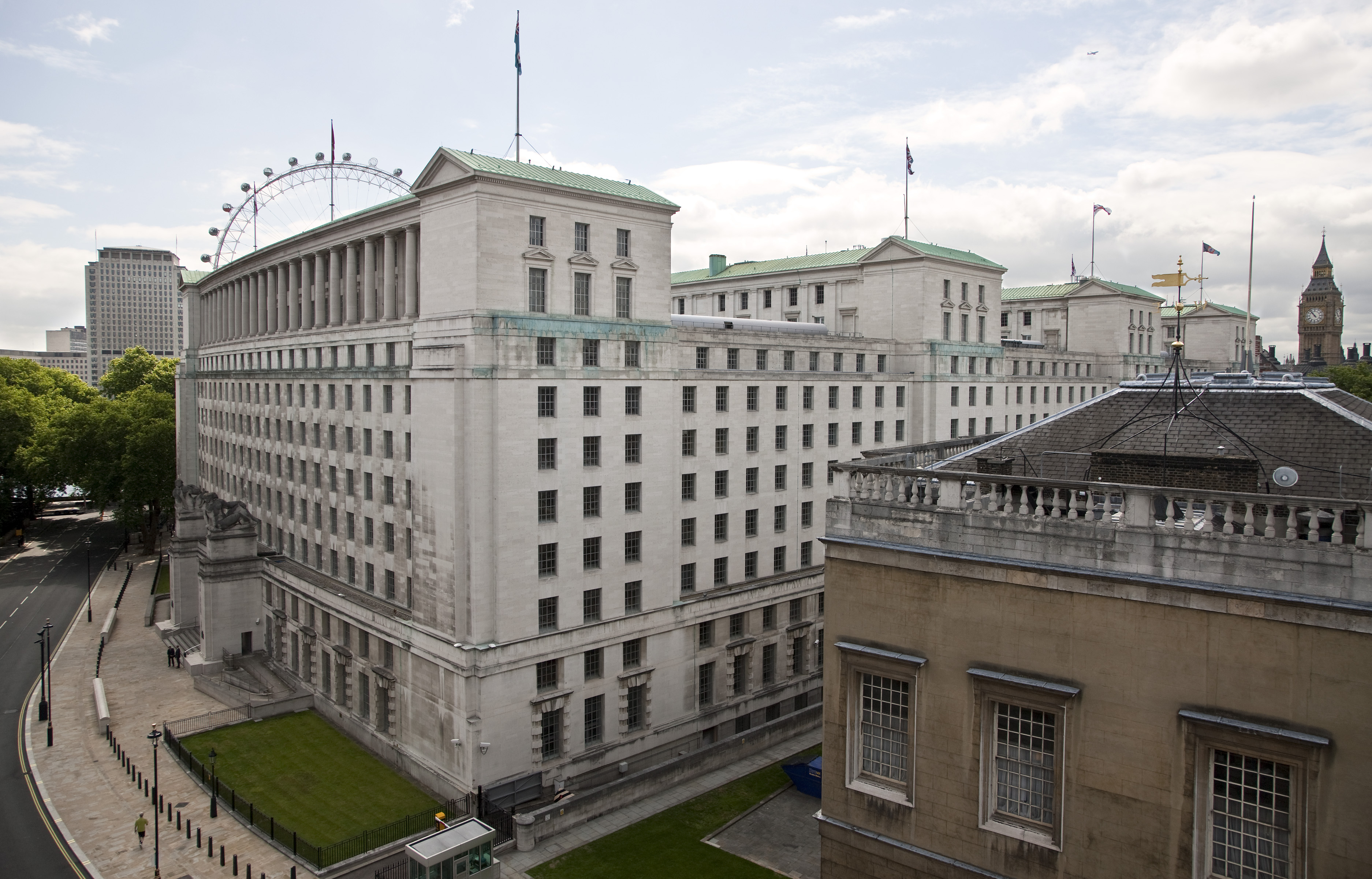
Ministry of Defence Main Building, Whitehall, London (1959)

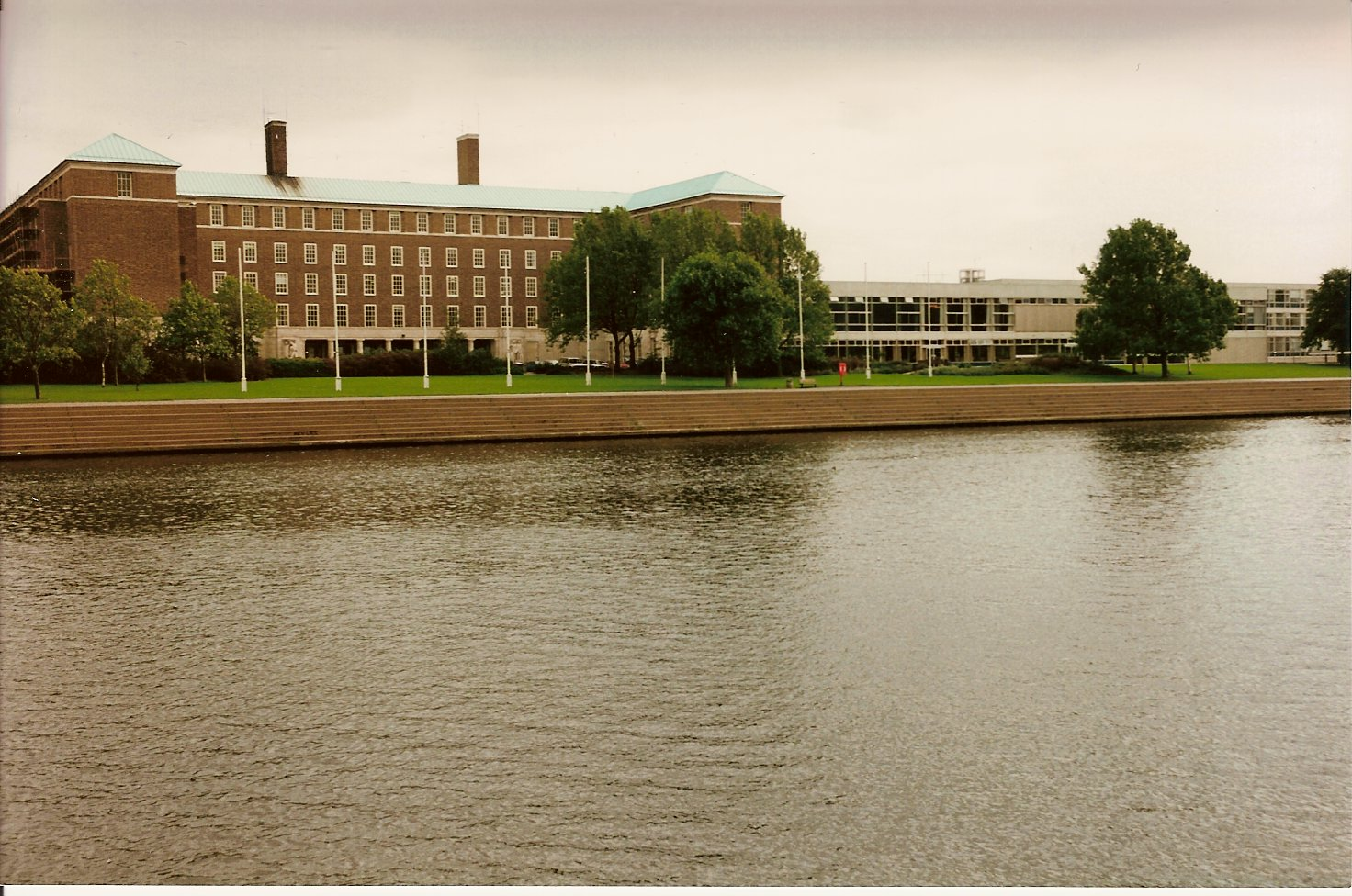
County Hall, Nottinghamshire (1954)

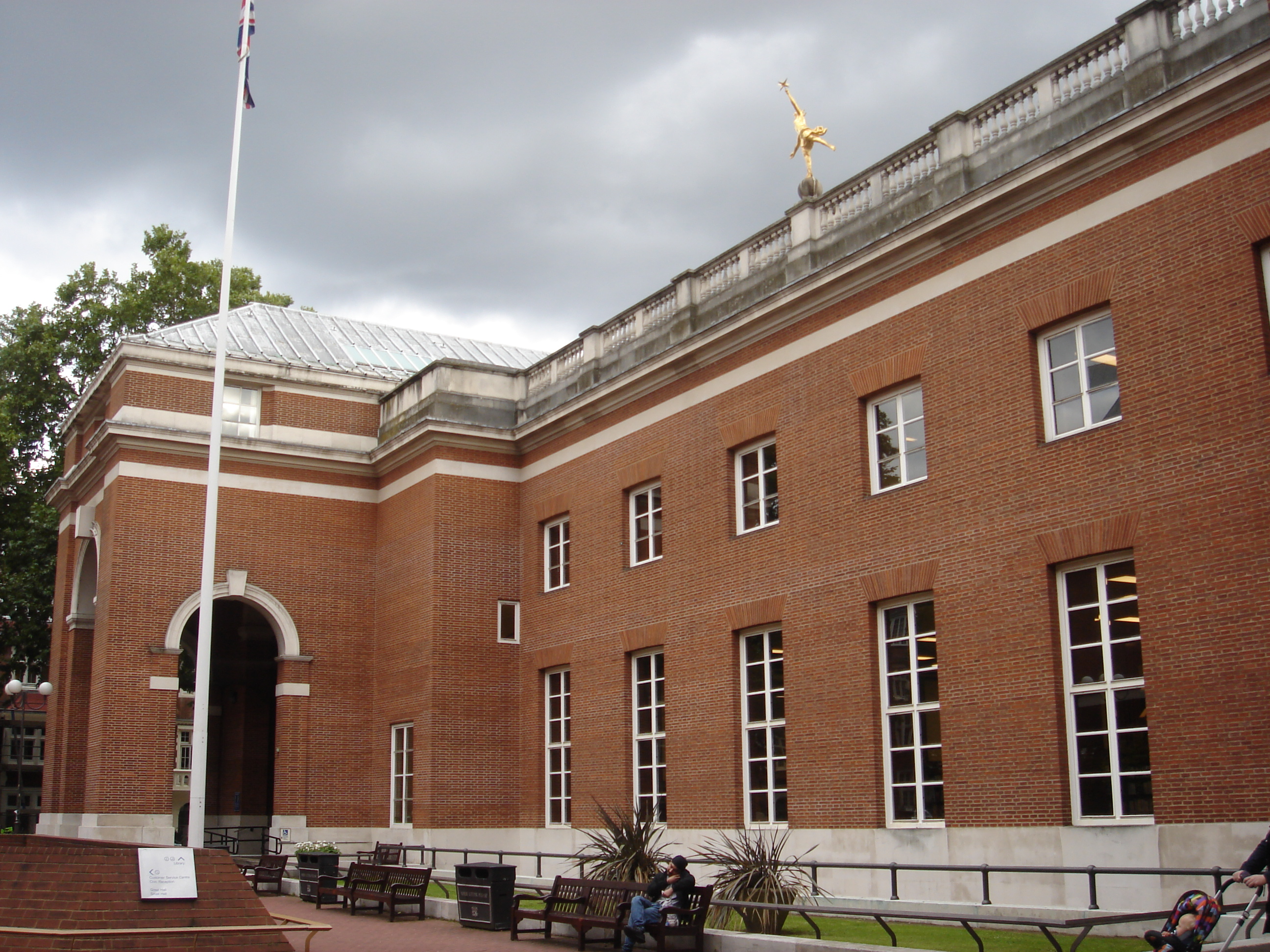
Kensington Central Library, London W8 (1960)

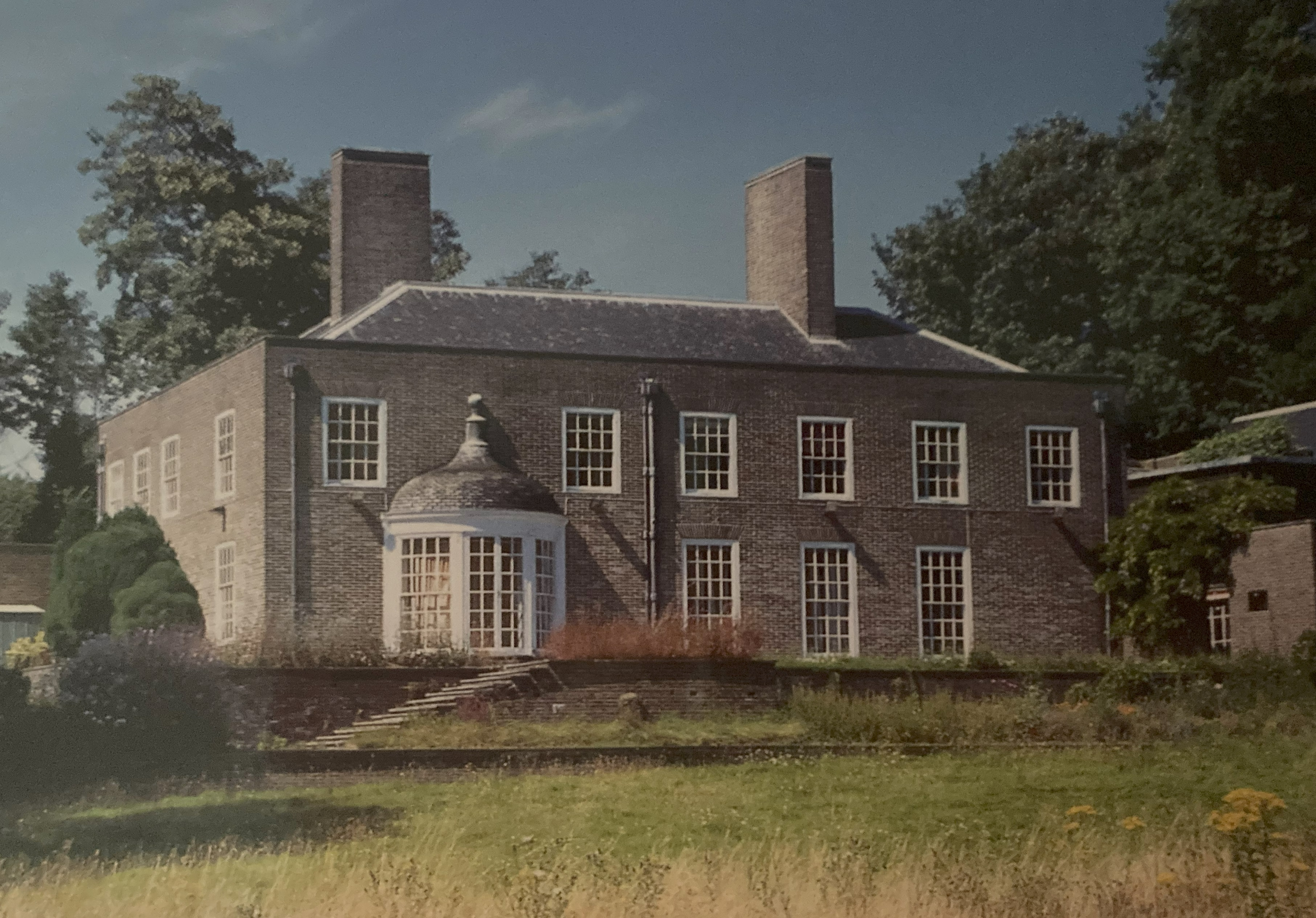
10 Fitzroy Park, Highgate, completed in 1934, the house Harris designed for himself
