= Taunton Shire Hall =

County building in Taunton, Somerset, England

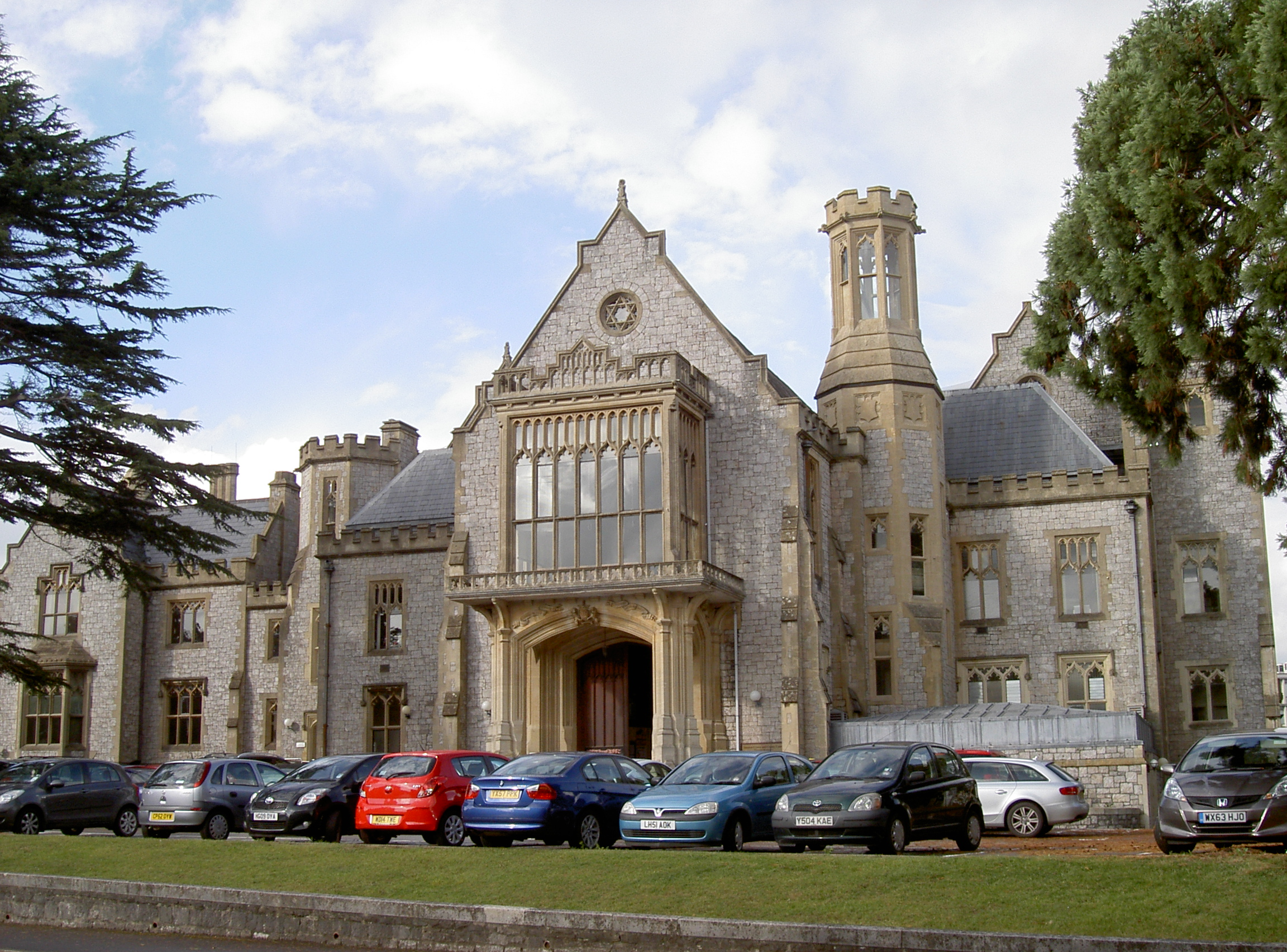
- Taunton Shire Hall

- Location within Somerset
- 51.0128°N 3.1077°W
- Location: Taunton, Somerset

History
- Built: 1858

Site notes
- Architect: William Bonython Moffatt
- Architectural style: Gothic style

Listed Building – Grade II
- Designated: 4 July 1975
- Reference no.: 1059958

Taunton Shire Hall is a municipal building on Shuttern in Taunton, Somerset. The Shire Hall, which serves as a Crown Court, is a Grade II listed building.

== History ==
Since the English Civil War, when the castle was repaired, the county assizes had been held in Taunton Castle. Indeed, it was at Taunton Castle that, in the aftermath of the Monmouth Rebellion, Judge Jeffreys held the Bloody Assizes from 17 September 1685 to 19 September 1685. After the justices decided, in the mid-19th century, that the facilities the castle were no longer adequate, they chose to procure a new purpose-built building on a site to the south-west of the castle.

The foundation stone for the building was laid by the Lord Lieutenant of Somerset, Viscount Portman, on 14 August 1855. It was designed by William Bonython Moffatt in the Gothic style, built by a local contractor, George Pollard, and completed in 1858. The design, which was crenellated, involved an asymmetrical main frontage with eleven bays facing onto Shuttern; the central section, which slightly projected forward, featured a large porch on the ground floor with a balcony and an oriel window on the first floor and an oculus in the gable; there were turrets at roof level. Internally, the principal rooms were the courtrooms and the Grand Jury Room which was behind the oriel window.

Shortly after the building opened, a bust of the locally-born naval commander, Admiral Robert Blake, by Edgar Papworth was installed in the reception area. A bust of the locally-born novelist and dramatist, Henry Fielding, was unveiled by the American Romantic poet, James Russell Lowell, on 8 September 1883 and a bust of the locally-born soldier, Colonel John Chard VC, was unveiled by the Commander-in-Chief of the Forces, Field Marshal Viscount Wolseley, on 2 November 1898

The Shire Hall continued to be used as a facility for dispensing justice but, following the implementation of the Local Government Act 1888, which established county councils in every county, it also became the meeting place of Somerset County Council. Following the First World War, a plaque was unveiled which commemorated county council employees who had died in the war.

After the County Council moved to County Hall in 1935, the former Shire Hall continued to be used as a Crown Court. A programme of refurbishment works were completed in 2018 following the discovery of structural issues with the building.
