= County Hall, Taunton =

County building in Taunton, Somerset, England

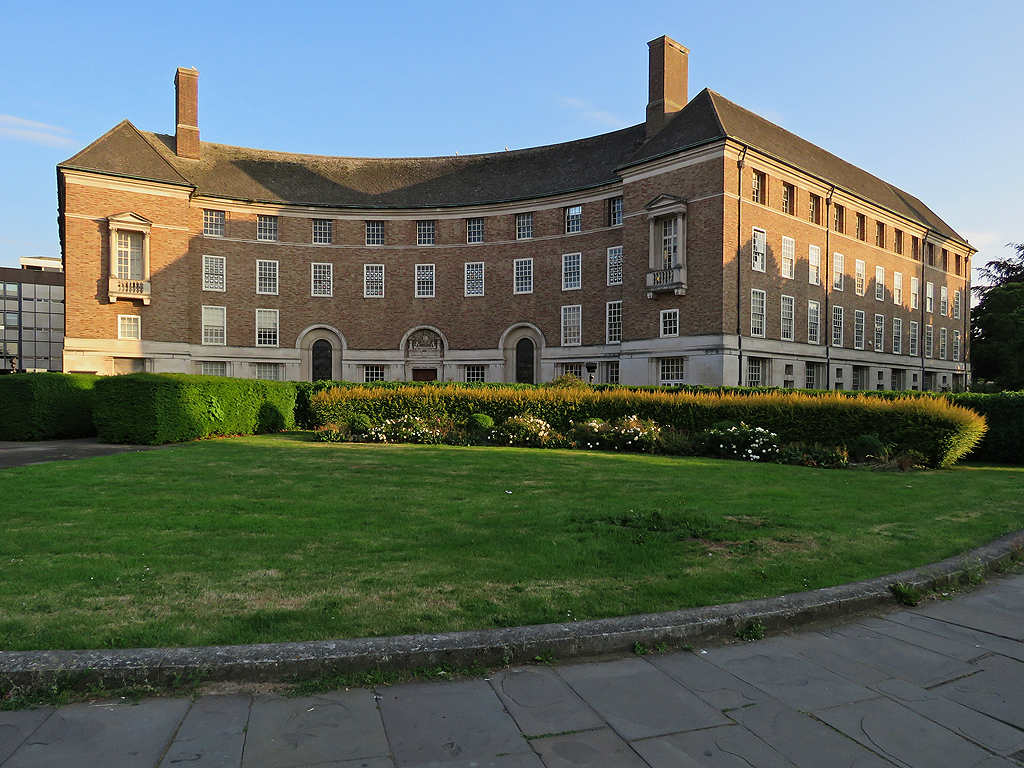
- County Hall in 2018

- Location within Somerset
- 51.0133°N 3.1068°W
- Location: Taunton, Somerset

History
- Built: 1935

Site notes
- Architect: E. Vincent Harris
- Architectural style: Neo-Georgian style

Listed Building – Grade II
- Designated: 5 December 2000
- Reference no.: 1246219

County Hall is a municipal building in The Crescent, Taunton, Somerset, England. The structure, which is the offices and meeting place of Somerset Council, is a Grade II Listed building.

== History ==
During the early part of the 20th century Somerset County Council was based at the Shire Hall. As the responsibilities of the county council increased significantly, county leaders decided to procure a more substantial county headquarters: the site they selected was open land just to the east of the old Shire Hall.

The new building, which was designed by E. Vincent Harris in the municipal neo-Georgian style, was completed on 23 October 1935. The design for the three-storey building involved a recessed concave main frontage of nine bays facing the corner of Park Street and The Crescent from which wings stretched back to the south west and south east; the central section featured a round headed doorway with coat of arms in the tympanum. It was constructed from English bond buff-coloured and pink bricks with the dressings in Portland stone. It was extended to the south in the 1960s to a design by Goodwin & Tatham to cover most of the open land to the west of The Crescent.

The Earl of Wessex visited County Hall and planted a tree to commemorate the 50th anniversary of The Duke of Edinburgh's Award on 25 April 2007, and, following the amalgamation of The Light Infantry into The Rifles in February 2007, a ceremony was held at which the Queen's Colour and Regimental Colour of the 6th Battalion (Somerset and Cornwall) The Light Infantry were placed in the entrance of County Hall in June 2009.

In September 2013, the county council announced that it was considering a variety of options for the effective use of the building. After some debate, plans were announced for Taunton Deane Council to share County Hall in 2014 and a £10 million programme of works to refurbish County Hall was completed in 2020.
