= Chris Clarke (politician) =

British politician (1941–2009)

Sir Christopher James Clarke OBE FRSA (24 March 1941 – 15 December 2009), was a British Liberal Democrat politician, leader of Somerset County Council and of his party's group in the Local Government Association.

== Life ==
Originally from Essex, where he was educated at Westcliff High School for Boys, Clarke first entered politics as an SDP councillor in Richmondshire, North Yorkshire, before moving to Somerset, where he worked for the shoe manufacturer Clarks. He was elected to Mendip District Council, rising to become its leader for four years. He was also elected to Somerset County Council, serving as member for the City of Wells from 1985 to 2005 and leading the county council from 1993 to 2001. He was then leader of the Liberal Democrats in the Local Government Association from 2001 to 2005.

In 2005 Clarke moved from Somerset to Gloucestershire to marry Liz, settling at Tibberton and standing unsuccessfully for Gloucestershire County Council. He went on to become Chairman of the South West Region of Arts Council England and of the NHS South Gloucestershire Trust Board, a Specialist Adviser to the Department for Communities and Local Government, and implementation manager at the Improvement and Development Agency. He was also a board member of the Stroud Theatre and the Somerset Arts Partnership and worked as a consultant as Director of Word on the Street Ltd.

On 15 October 2007, Clarke intervened in a Liberal Democrat Party leadership crisis, appearing on BBC TV's World at One with Menzies Campbell's deputy Vince Cable. Cable conceded that Campbell's position was "certainly under discussion", adding "I don't think it's under threat", but Clarke advised Campbell to "go with dignity and go back to being foreign affairs spokesman, where the world listens to you." Later the same day came an announcement by the party that Campbell would step down as leader.

In May 2009, in defence of a former Somerset County Council colleague accused by its chief executive of bullying, Clarke offered to give evidence to the Adjudication Panel for England to the effect that there was a 'culture of bullying' within the county council. The affair was debated in the House of Commons on 21 April 2009.

Following his death in December 2009, his obituary in the Western Daily Press noted that Clarke "was famous for his dry sense of humour", while his LGA colleague Richard Kemp said of him

We will remember Chris as a great liberal, a hard working councillor and a person whose dry humour brought life to many an interminable meeting on arcane matters of local government finance and administration.

== Honours ==
In June 2000, Clarke was appointed an Officer of the Order of the British Empire "for services to Local Government and to the community in South West England". In the Birthday Honours List of June 2005 he received a knighthood "for services to Local Government".
