= Somerset Council =

Local government authority in South West England

- Coat of arms

- Council logo

Type
- Type: Unitary authority

History
- Founded: 1 April 1889 (Administrative); 1 April 1974 (Non-metropolitan); 1 April 2023 (Unitary)

Leadership
- Chair: Mike Best, Liberal Democrats since 25 May 2022
- Leader: Bill Revans, Liberal Democrats since 25 May 2022
- Chief Executive: Duncan Sharkey since 3 October 2022

Structure
- Seats: 110 councillors
- Graph of the party split among 110 seats.
- Political groups: Administration (62) Liberal Democrats (62) Other parties (48) Conservative (31) Green (5) Labour (5) Reform (3) Independent (4)

Elections
- Voting system: Plurality-at-large
- Last election: 5 May 2022
- Next election: 6 May 2027

Meeting place
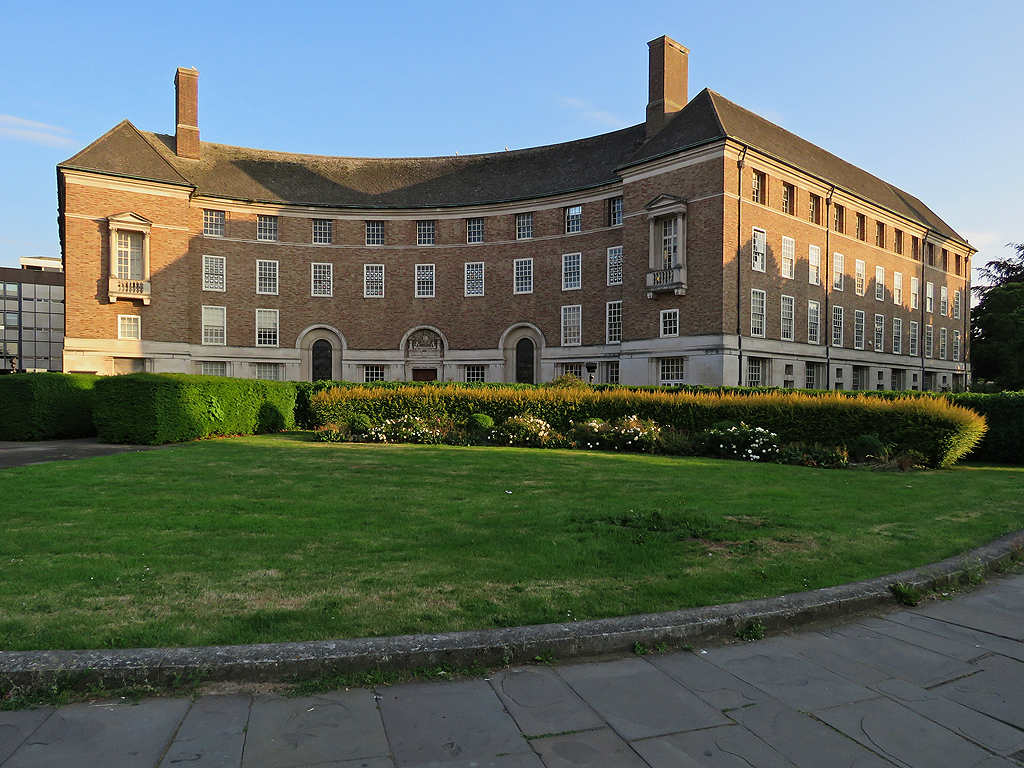
- County Hall, The Crescent, Taunton, TA1 4DY

Website
- www.somerset.gov.uk

Constitution
- Somerset Council Constitution

Somerset Council, known until 1 April 2023 as Somerset County Council, is the unitary authority that governs the district of Somerset, which occupies the southern part of the ceremonial county of the same name in the South West of England. The council has been controlled by the Liberal Democrats since the 2022 local elections, and its headquarters is County Hall in Taunton.

The council is the successor to the county council of the administrative county of Somerset, which was created on 1 April 1889. The council was abolished and reconstituted in 1974, when local government in England was reformed and a non-metropolitan county of Somerset was created, governed by a county council and five, later four, district councils. The districts were abolished in 2023 and the county council took on their responsibilities, becoming a unitary authority.

The Conservative Party has been the largest or second-largest party on the council since 1973, and since 1981 has competed with the Liberal Democrats for control; each party has formed several majority administrations in the period since.

== History ==
Administrative counties and elected county councils were established in England from 1889 under the Local Government Act 1888, taking over administrative functions previously carried out by unelected magistrates at the quarter sessions. The administrative county of Somerset excluded the city of Bath, which was a county borough.

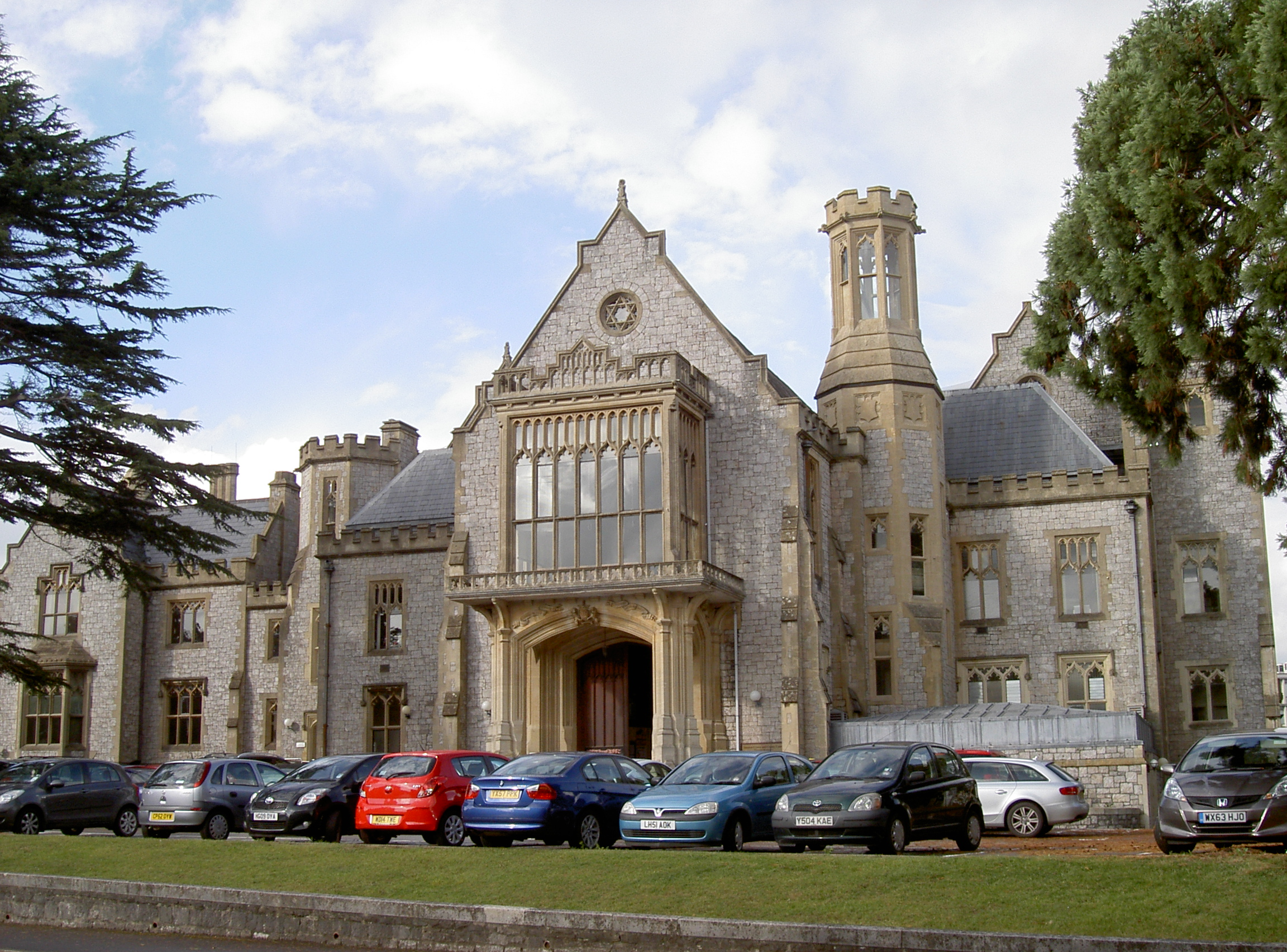
Shire Hall, Taunton: the council's meeting place 1889–2020

The first elections to the new Somerset County Council were held on 23 January 1889 and it formally came into existence on 1 April 1889, on which day it held its first official meeting at the Town Hall in Highbridge. The council resolved to hold future meetings at the Shire Hall in Taunton rather than the Town Hall in Wells, where the quarter sessions had been held, as the former was better-served by the railways.

In 1974, as part of wider reforms to local government in England and Wales, administrative counties were abolished and replaced by a two-tier system of non-metropolitan counties and non-metropolitan districts. Somerset became a non-metropolitan county governed by a new county council and five districts: Sedgemoor, West Somerset, Taunton Deane, South Somerset, and Mendip. At the same time, the north of the administrative county and the county borough of Bath became part of the new non-metropolitan county of Avon; the county was abolished in 1996, and this area is now two unitary authorities within the ceremonial county of Somerset. In 2019, West Somerset and Taunton Deane were merged to form the district of Somerset West and Taunton.

=== Conversion to unitary authority ===
Logo used before the unitary changes in 2023

The first proposal to create a Somerset unitary authority was made in 2007, but was rejected in a local referendum.

The idea of a unitary Somerset was revived as part of the 2019–2023 structural changes to local government in England. The county council proposed a single unitary authority and the district councils two unitary authorities called East Somerset and West Somerset. A non-binding local referendum favoured the two-authority proposal, however a single authority was created. This came into being on 1 April 2023, when the districts were abolished and the county council assumed their powers. As part of the changes, the county council was given the option of omitting the word 'county' from its name, which it took.

== Governance ==
Somerset Council provides both county-level and district-level functions. The whole county is also covered by civil parishes, which form a second tier of local government.

Somerset Council appoints seven members to the Devon and Somerset Fire and Rescue Authority.

=== Political control ===
The council has been under Liberal Democrat majority control since 2022.

Political control of the council since the 1974 reforms has been as follows:

Two-tier non-metropolitan county council

Party in control	Years
Conservative	1974–1985
No overall control	1985–1989
Conservative	1989–1993
Liberal Democrats	1993–2001
No overall control	2001–2005
Liberal Democrats	2005–2009
Conservative	2009–2022
Liberal Democrats	2022–2023

Unitary authority

Party in control	Years
Liberal Democrats	2023–present

=== Leadership ===
The leaders of the council since 1993 have been:

Councillor	Party	From	To
Chris Clarke	Liberal Democrats	1993	2001
Cathy Bakewell	Liberal Democrats	2001	May 2007
Jill Shortland	Liberal Democrats	May 2007	Jun 2009
Ken Maddock	Conservative	Jun 2009	Apr 2012
John Osman	Conservative	16 May 2012	May 2017
David Fothergill	Conservative	24 May 2017	May 2022
Bill Revans	Liberal Democrats	25 May 2022	

=== Composition ===
Following the 2022 election, and subsequent by-elections and changes of allegiance up to January 2026, the composition of the council was as follows:

Party	Councillors
Liberal Democrats	62
Conservative	31
Green	5
Labour	5
Reform	3
Independent	4
Total	110

Three of the independent councillors sit together as a group. The next election is due in 2027.

== Elections ==
The last full review of electoral boundaries took effect in 2013, when the county was divided into 54 electoral divisions, each of which elected one councillor except for the Glastonbury and Street division which elected two. As part of the process leading up to becoming a unitary authority in 2023, the election that should have been held in 2021 was postponed until 2022, at which election the number of councillors was doubled. Each division then elected two councillors, and the old Glastonbury and Street division was divided into two divisions each of which elected two councillors, giving 110 councillors in total. The councillors who were elected in 2022 are due to serve an extended five-year term until 2027, after which elections will be held every four years.

== Premises ==
The council has its headquarters at County Hall on The Crescent in Taunton, which was purpose-built for the council and opened in 1935. The complex has been subsequently extended, notably with a large tower block in the 1960s.

When first created in 1889, the council chose to meet at Shire Hall in Taunton, a courthouse completed in 1858 which had been one of the meeting places of the quarter sessions which preceded the county council. County Hall was built immediately to the east of Shire Hall to accommodate the council's offices, but full council meetings continued to be held in the council chamber at Shire Hall until 2020. In-person council meetings were suspended in 2020 due to the COVID-19 pandemic. Since the resumption of in-person meetings in 2021, full council meetings have been held in various larger venues across the county, initially to allow for social distancing and since 2022 to accommodate the larger number of councillors.

The council has several other administrative buildings across the county, including the offices of the former district councils that it inherited in 2023. As at March 2024 the council was considering its options for how to reduce the number of buildings it operates.

== Children's services ==
In January 2013, Ofsted inspectors gave Somerset Councils' Children’s Services the lowest rating of "inadequate".

In January 2015, Ofsted reinspected the Children’s Services Department and concluded that it remained "inadequate". The corresponding report found no improvement in the care provided by the children's services and described a "corporate failure" to keep children safe. Ofsted found there were "widespread or serious failures" which it considered placed children to be harmed or at risk of harm. The report also identified managers who "have not been able to demonstrate sufficient understanding of failures" and had been ineffective in "prioritising, challenging and making improvements".

In January 2015, Julian Wooster was appointed director of Children's Services, the fifth such appointment in five years.

In November 2017, the service was inspected by Ofsted. Services were judged to have improved, but still "require[d] improvement to be good" in all but one area. The report found that services for children needing help and protection required improvement, as did leadership, management and governance. The inspectors concluded that too many children in foster care experienced moves between placements before they were found the right home. Inspectors singled out adoption services as being "good".

In July 2022, the service was judged by Ofsted to be "good" in all areas, but found that two areas still needed improvement: placement sufficiency, and the take-up of return home interviews for children who have been missing.

== Funding cuts ==
Somerset County Council needed to save £19.5 million in 2017/18, but only cut £11.1 million. Cuts were announced to highways, public transport and special needs services. Staff were told to take two days off unpaid for the coming two years. The chief executive said he had "no choice" because of cuts to central government funding. Further proposed cuts include reducing winter gritting, suspending 'park and ride' services, stopping funding for Citizens Advice, cutting adult social care and support for people with learning difficulties, cuts to the GetSet programme which helps stop vulnerable young people needing social care.

In July 2018, two senior Conservative councillors resigned over concerns regarding the council's handling of financial matters. Dean Ruddle and Neil Bloomfield had previously held roles as the respective chair and vice chair of the audit committee. An official audit of the council criticised its "pervasive" overspending and its failure to deliver sufficient savings over the previous 12 months. In September 2018, the council voted through £28 million of spending cuts, spread over the next two years. Critics of the cuts, including Labour and Liberal Democrat councillors, noted that between 2009 and 2016, Somerset's Conservative administration had voted to freeze Council Tax, when an increase of 1.9% would have brought in an additional £114 million.

Following the change to unitary status, in November 2023 the council declared a financial emergency, projecting an overspend of £27 million in that year and a deficit of £100 million for 2024–2025, arising in part from an expected increase of £70 million in the cost of adult social care. It was also reported that the council had inherited Council Tax arrears of more than £43 million from the four district councils.

In 2024 Somerset council cut £420,000 of funding from theatres in the county. As a result of these cuts, the Brewhouse Theatre in Taunton will be closed at the end of October 2026.

== Notable members ==
Incomplete list, in chronological order

- Sir Edward Strachey, 3rd Baronet (1889–1892)
- Henry Hobhouse (from the 1890s), later Chairman of Council, also Member of Parliament for East Somerset
- Sir Frank Beauchamp (1907–1946), created a baronet in 1918
- Arthur Hobhouse (1925–1947), previously Member of Parliament for Wells, Chairman of Council 1940–1947
- Geoffrey Waldegrave, 12th Earl Waldegrave (first elected 1937)
- Sir John Wills, 4th Baronet (1958–1974, Ind.)
- Marshal of the Royal Air Force Sir John Slessor (1963–1974), previously Chief of the Air Staff
- Richard Needham (1967–1974), later Member of Parliament for North Wiltshire
- Sir Michael Gass (1977–1981), previously acting Governor of Hong Kong
- Sir Chris Clarke (1985–2005), Leader of the council from 1993 to 2001
- Elizabeth Gass, Lady Gass, member 1985 to 1997, later Lord Lieutenant of Somerset
- David Heath (1985–1997), later Member of Parliament for Somerton and Frome
- Susan Miller, Baroness Miller of Chilthorne Domer (1989–2005), Liberal Democrat spokesman on Home Affairs
- Jackie Ballard (1993–1997), later Member of Parliament for Taunton
- Robin Bush (1997–2009), Chairman of Council 2001–2005, also a historian
- Tessa Munt (2017–present), also Member of Parliament for Wells and Mendip Hills
- Sarah Dyke (2022–present), also Member of Parliament for Somerton and Frome

== See also ==
- High Sheriff of Somerset
- Lord Lieutenant of Somerset
- List of civil parishes in Somerset
- List of places in Somerset
