= Mary Harris Memorial Chapel of the Holy Trinity =

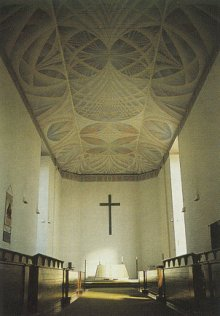
- Inside view of the chapel
- Mary Harris Memorial Chapel of the Holy Trinity
- Denomination: Church of England
- Churchmanship: Liberal Anglo-Catholic
- Website: www.exeter.ac.uk/chaplaincy

History
- Founded: 1958
- Dedication: Holy Trinity
- Consecrated: 26 June 1958

Administration
- Province: Canterbury
- Diocese: Exeter

Listed Building – Grade II
- Designated: 29 March 1988
- Reference no.: 1266776

The Mary Harris Memorial Chapel of the Holy Trinity is the Anglican Chaplaincy's chapel on the Streatham Campus of the University of Exeter. It is located at the heart of the campus, beneath Queen's Building and adjacent to the Old Library and the Roborough Building.

The chapel is served by the Lazenby Chaplain who is assisted in the chapel's worship life by a team of servers and the University Chapel Choir.

== History ==
The Mary Harris Memorial Chapel of the Holy Trinity within the University of Exeter which was designed and presented to the university by Dr E. Vincent Harris OBE RA, in memory of his mother. The chapel was consecrated by The Reverend Robert Mortimer, the Lord Bishop of Exeter on 26 June 1958. It was declared a Grade II Listed Building on 29 March 1988. The mural on the ceiling was painted by Sir Walter Thomas Monnington.

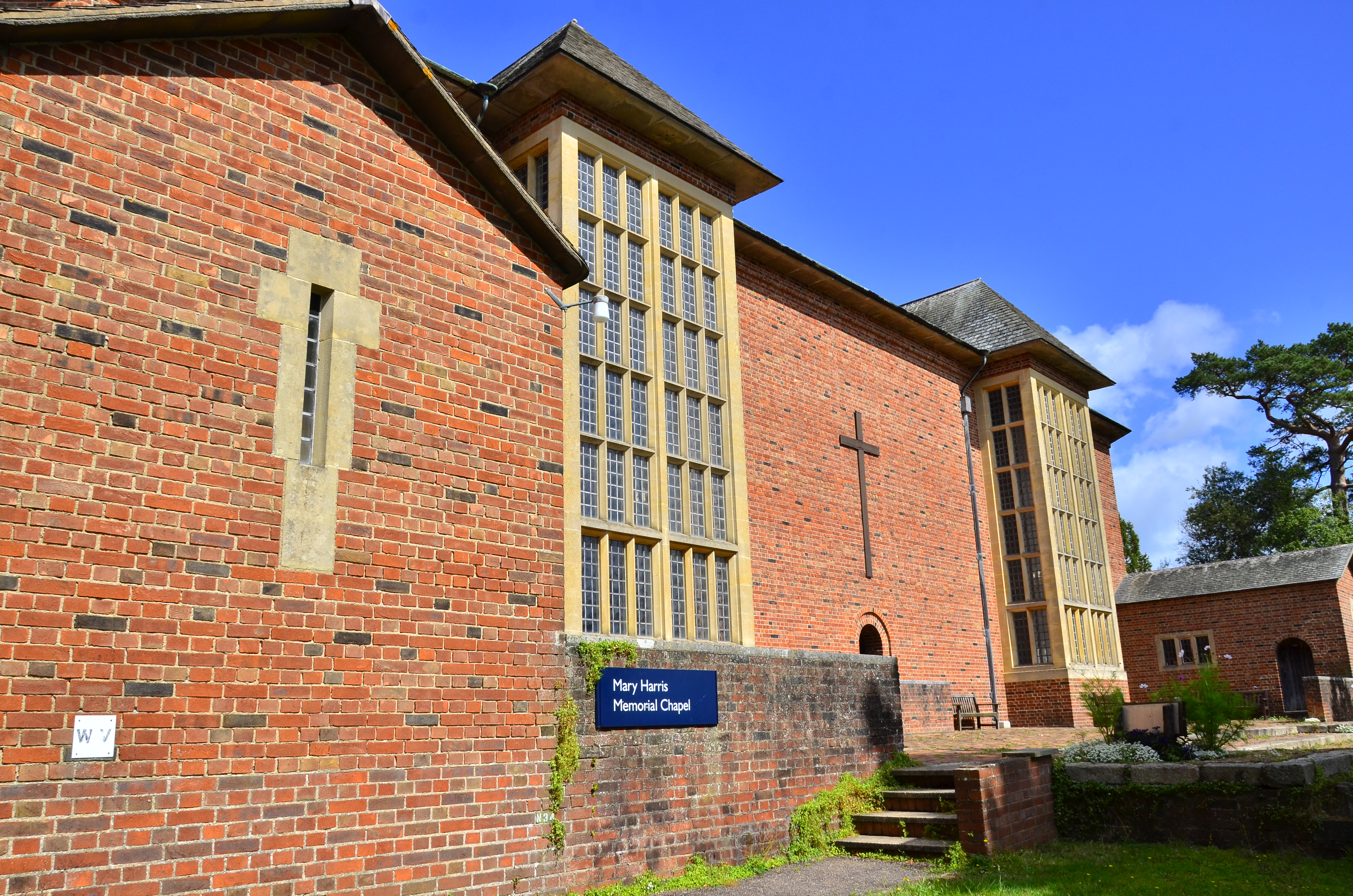
Outside view of the chapel.

== Organ ==
The pipe organ in the gallery was built in 1958, with modifications in the 1970s by Eustace and Alldridge and, later, by Percy Daniel & Co; it ceased being used in 2010 and an electronic organ has been in use since.

== Address ==
Mary Harris Memorial Chapel of the Holy Trinity, Prince of Wales Road, Exeter EX4 4PX.

== See also ==
- Diocese of Exeter
