= Leeds Civic Hall =

Municipal building in Leeds, West Yorkshire, England

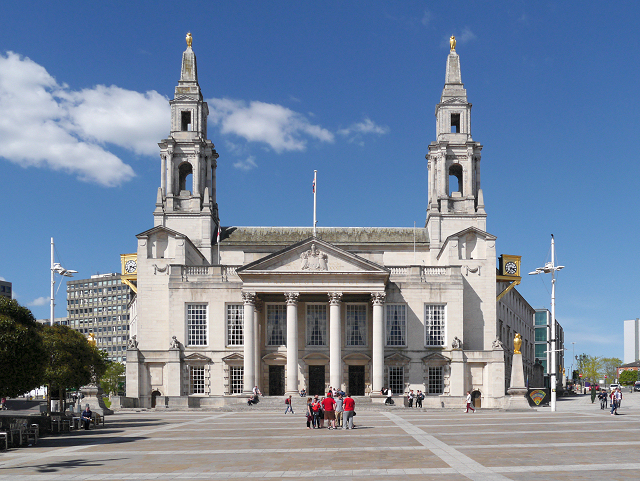
- Leeds Civic Hall in Millennium Square

- Location within West Yorkshire

General information
- Architectural style: Classical/Art Deco
- Location: Leeds, West Yorkshire, England
- Coordinates: 53.80214°N 1.5485°W
- Construction started: September 1930
- Opened: 23 August 1933
- Cost: £360,000
- Client: Leeds City Council

Height
- Tip: 170 ft (52 m)

Technical details
- Material: Portland stone

Design and construction
- Architect: E. Vincent Harris
- Other designers: George Kruger Gray, Herman Cawthra, John Hodge; John Thorp
- Main contractor: Armitage and Hodgson
- Designations

Listed Building – Grade II*
- Designated: 5 August 1976
- Reference no.: 1255781

Leeds Civic Hall is a municipal building located in the civic quarter of Leeds, West Yorkshire, England. It replaced Leeds Town Hall as the administrative centre in 1933. The Civic Hall houses Leeds City Council offices, council chamber and a banqueting hall, and is a Grade II* listed building. A city landmark, two 2.3 metres (7 ft 7 in) high gold-leafed owls top its twin towers, decorations which are joined by four more owls on columns in Millennium Square, which sits to the front, and a gilded clock on both sides.

== History ==
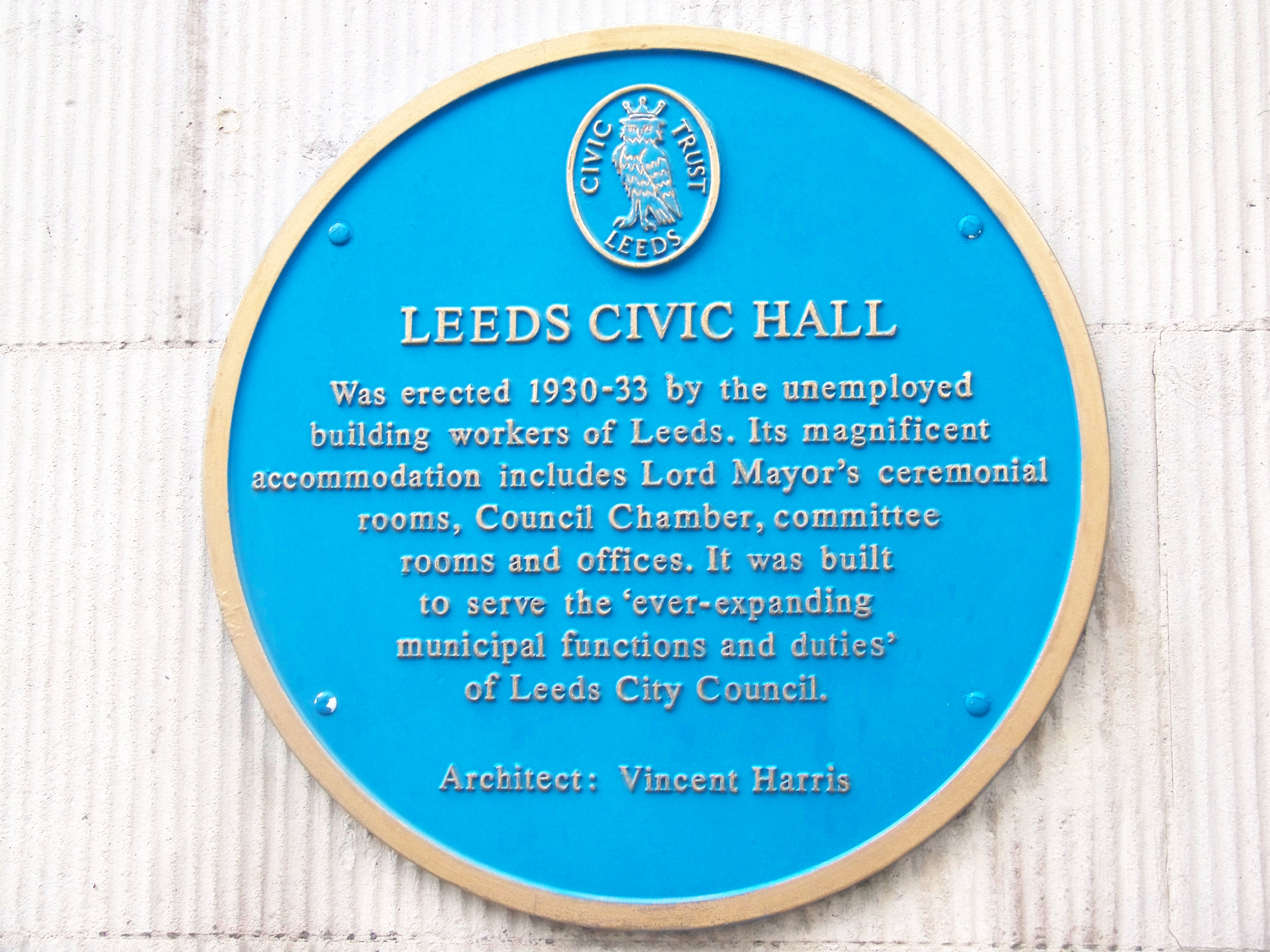
Leeds Civic Trust blue plaque on the Civic Hall

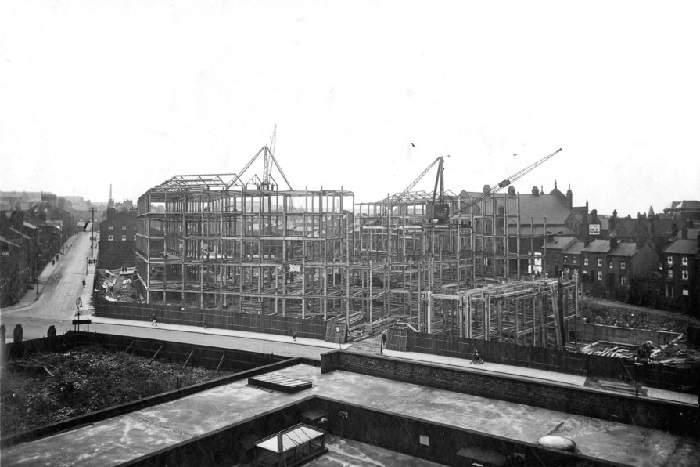
Construction of the Civic Hall c. 1931

Since 1858, the Leeds City Council had met in the Town Hall, but over time, with the growth in local government responsibilities, more and more departments were moved into separate offices. This was inefficient and unsatisfactory, and with the forthcoming enlargement of the number of council seats from sixty-eight to a hundred, the whole question of accommodation had to be considered. A special sub-committee was established in 1929, and it was eventually decided that an entirely new building was required.

Due to the economic climate, it was pursued as a Keynesian project to provide work for labourers. Unemployment in Leeds was very high during the Depression, reaching 17% in 1930 and 21% in 1931. In mid-1930, two council aldermen approached the government to receive funding from the unemployed relief works programme, and were advised to get a detailed and costed scheme submitted as soon as possible, as the government was liable to fall at any time. While in London, they were given a recommendation for the architect E. Vincent Harris, whose Sheffield City Hall was under construction at the time. Harris was able to satisfy them that he could prepare all the necessary drawings and quantities within a matter of weeks as required. However, there was disapproval when the rest of the council learned of the appointment of a London architect, and the scheme hit a hitch when Harris insisted he would only design a building on a higher site than the Town Hall, rather than the council's preferred site on Headrow. A site between Portland Crescent and the General Infirmary on Calverley Street was agreed, the new hall to take the place of a block known as St James Square. Controversy arose at the time because of the use of white Portland stone contrasting with the then soot-blackened Town Hall.

Construction work began in September 1930, only slightly more than three months after the building's approval from the special sub-committee. This was a very rapid development compared to the Town Hall, which took three years between agreement for the hall in July 1850 and the laying of its foundation stone in August 1853. The building contract was awarded to Armitage & Hodgson of Leeds, which had carried out many important constructional contracts in the city, including the university and the Devonshire Hall. 90% of the workforce were unemployed locals - the council were successful in applying for the government's Unemployed Grants Committee funds - who worked in different teams for set periods of time in order to spread the work among the unemployed. The final cost was £360,000, the equivalent of £17 million in 2018.

The expanded city council was elected in November 1930, and met for its first three occasions at the Great Hall of the University of Leeds. Problems with acoustics in this venue meant that, following alterations to reduce the size of the public gallery, it returned to the Town Hall council chamber until the Civic Hall's opening two and a half years later. It was completed six months ahead of schedule and opened by King George V and Queen Mary on 23 August 1933, seventy-five years after the king's grandmother had opened the Town Hall. The ceremonial key used to open the Civic Hall was returned from New Zealand on 7 June 1993 after having been missing since 1933.

The gardens laid out in front of the Civic Hall once included the Coronation Fountain, erected in 1953 and demolished the following year. A plaque marking the golden jubilee (50th anniversary) of the building was unveiled on 23 August 1983 by Lord Mayor Martin Dodgson. The steps and paving in front of the main entrance were relaid in early 1994, using new blocks and slabs of Portland stone. The building was cleaned in 1994–95.

== Design ==
As ambitious as the Town Hall, but not quite as self confident. [...] The lack of four-square self-confidence was no doubt unavoidable. 1933 could no longer use the classical or the Baroque idiom with anything like the robust conviction of the Victorians. England in its official architecture clung to the mood of grandeur, but the bottom had fallen out of it. Yet the towers by their very thinness and duplication impress from a distance, and the oddities of detail – oddities imitated from Lutyens – are at least more acceptable than the deadly correctness of others of the incorrigible classicists of 1930.

— Nikolaus Pevsner

We have set up over [the Civic Hall] the owls we share with Athens and, for all our difficulties in these harsher days, we feel towards our city that devotion out of which the Greeks built their civic pride and joy.

— The Yorkshire Post on the day of opening

=== Exterior ===
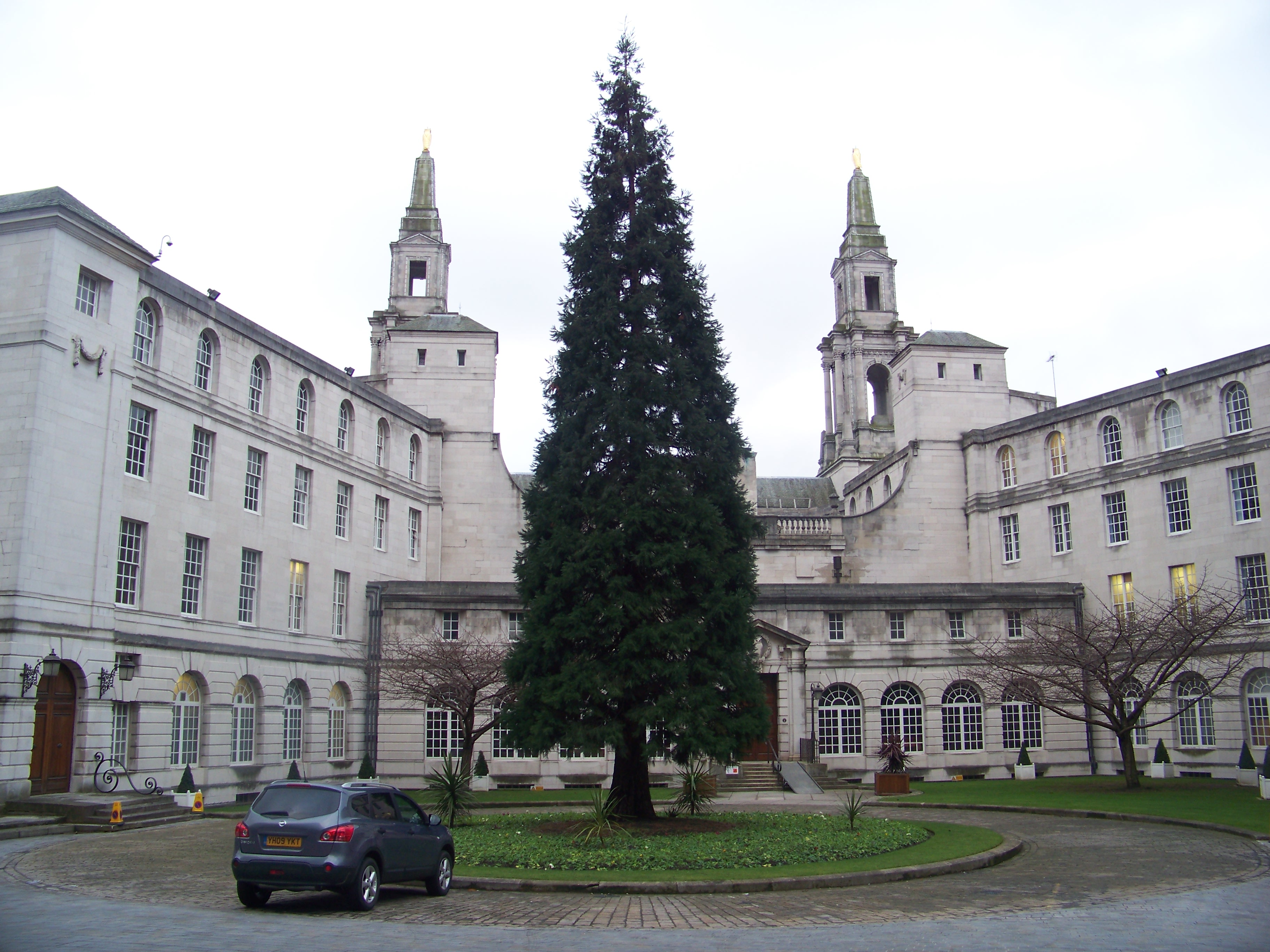
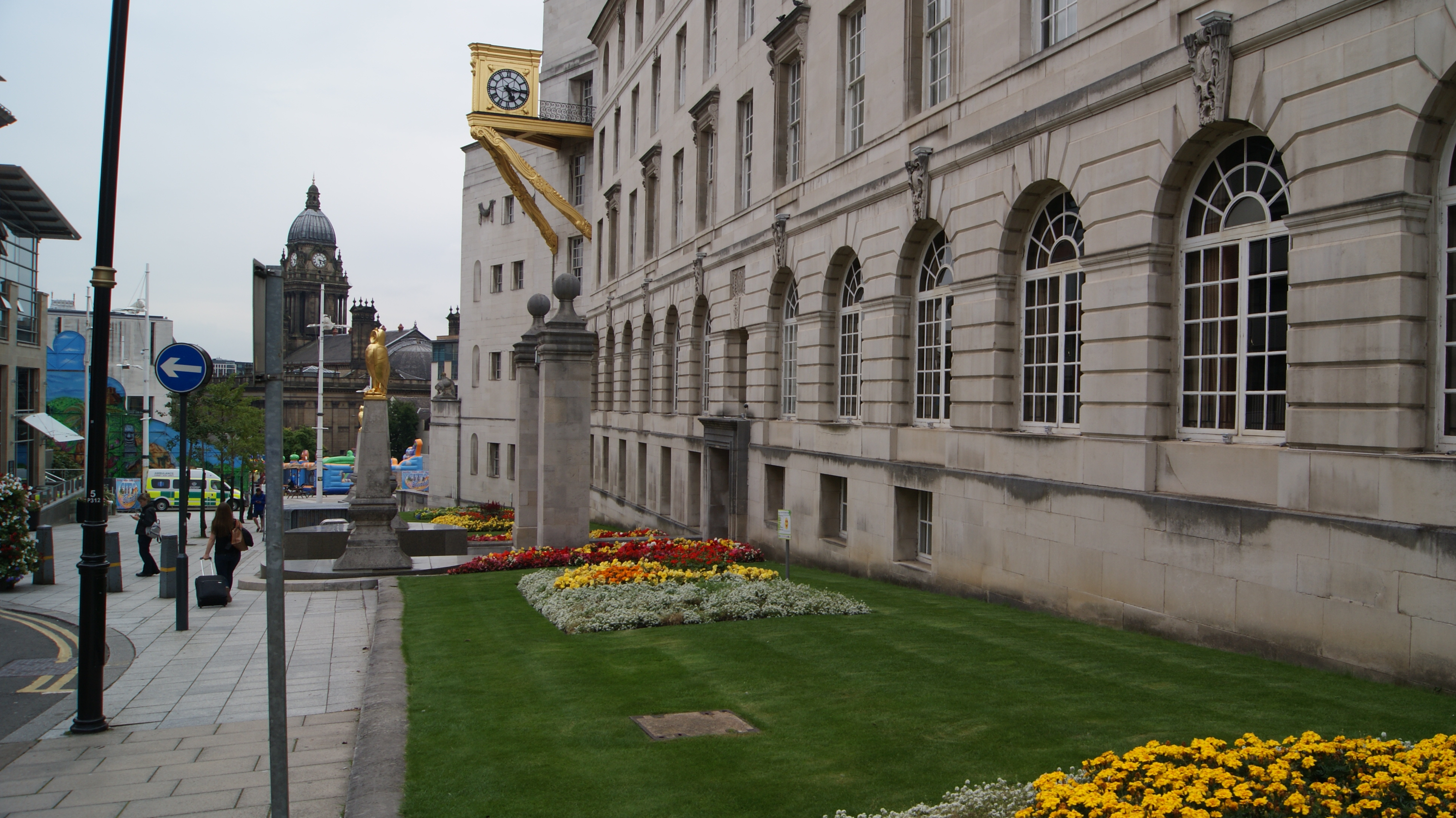
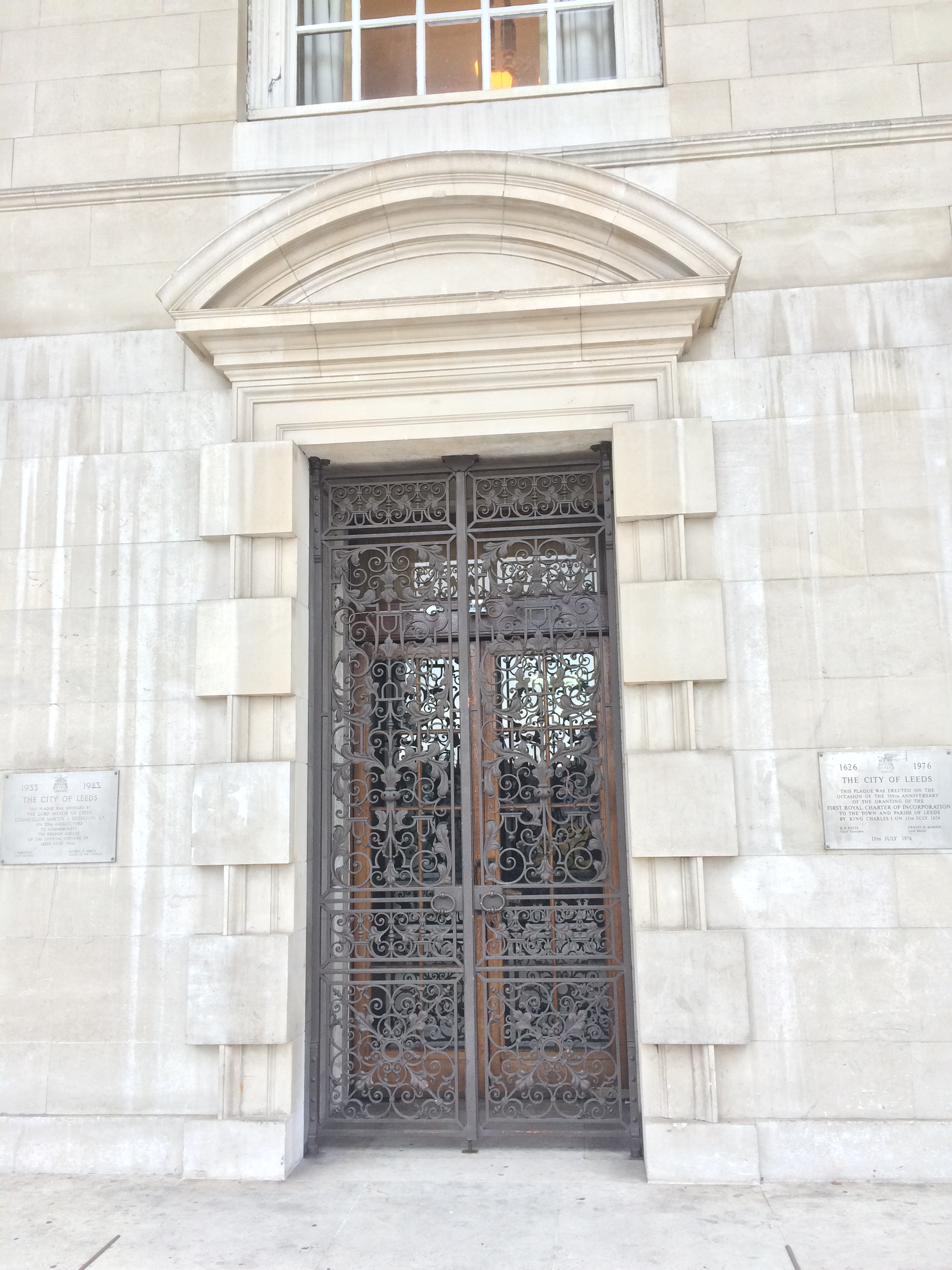
Golden owl ; clock; tower ; courtyard; flowerbed ; entrance door

The Civic Hall is on a triangular site at the top of a slope, looking down over what is now Millennium Square, but what was originally an ornamental garden and fountain. It has a symmetrical front, but is in the form of a truncated V where the west wing is longer than the east one. The building abandons the traditional materials of Yorkshire stone or brick to use Portland stone, which important buildings constructed in Leeds between the wars had all used – the Queens Hotel or the University, for example. It has a Cumbrian or Lakeland green slate roof in Palladian style. The main portico covers two storeys with a pediment supported on six large Corinthian columns. In the centre of the pediment is carved the arms of the city, and in gilded Roman numerals, the dates of the granting of the charter and the completion of the building (1626 and 1933 respectively). The two wings have five storeys. There are two 170 feet (52 m) tall towers in the style of Christopher Wren and similar to the spire of the church of St Vedast by Nicholas Hawksmoor. Harris's first design proposed shorter, domed towers. A partially enclosed courtyard at the north side is the site of a single fir tree and the Councillors' private entrance. It is the only part of the site to use a local material, being paved with Yorkstone setts.

Exterior decoration is minimal but finely crafted. The three entrance doors inside the portico each have a pair of ornate wrought-iron gates by J. Wippell, London. There is a golden owl on top of each tower by John Hodge, who also carved the coat of arms in the pediment. Each is cast in bronze, covered in gold leaf, is 7 feet 6 inches (2.29 m) tall and weighs half a ton. The owl comes from the city seal, itself from the coat of arms of the first Alderman, Sir John Savile. A further 4 owls by City Architect John Thorp were erected on square columns in 2000 as part of the creation of Millennium Square. There are also carved and gilded clocks by Potts & Sons projecting on a bracket from each side of the hall; these have tortoises around the dial. "These were not part of the original brief; they were added by the craftsmen. The workers assured the decision makers that any civic, south facing clocks should include a turtle reference, however small. They asserted that it was a tradition which linked back to ancient Greece where turtles were often used to symbolise and, for a short period, measure time. The truth was more prosaic. Tortoise was the nickname of their apprentice, who not only worked slowly but had no neck."

=== Interior ===
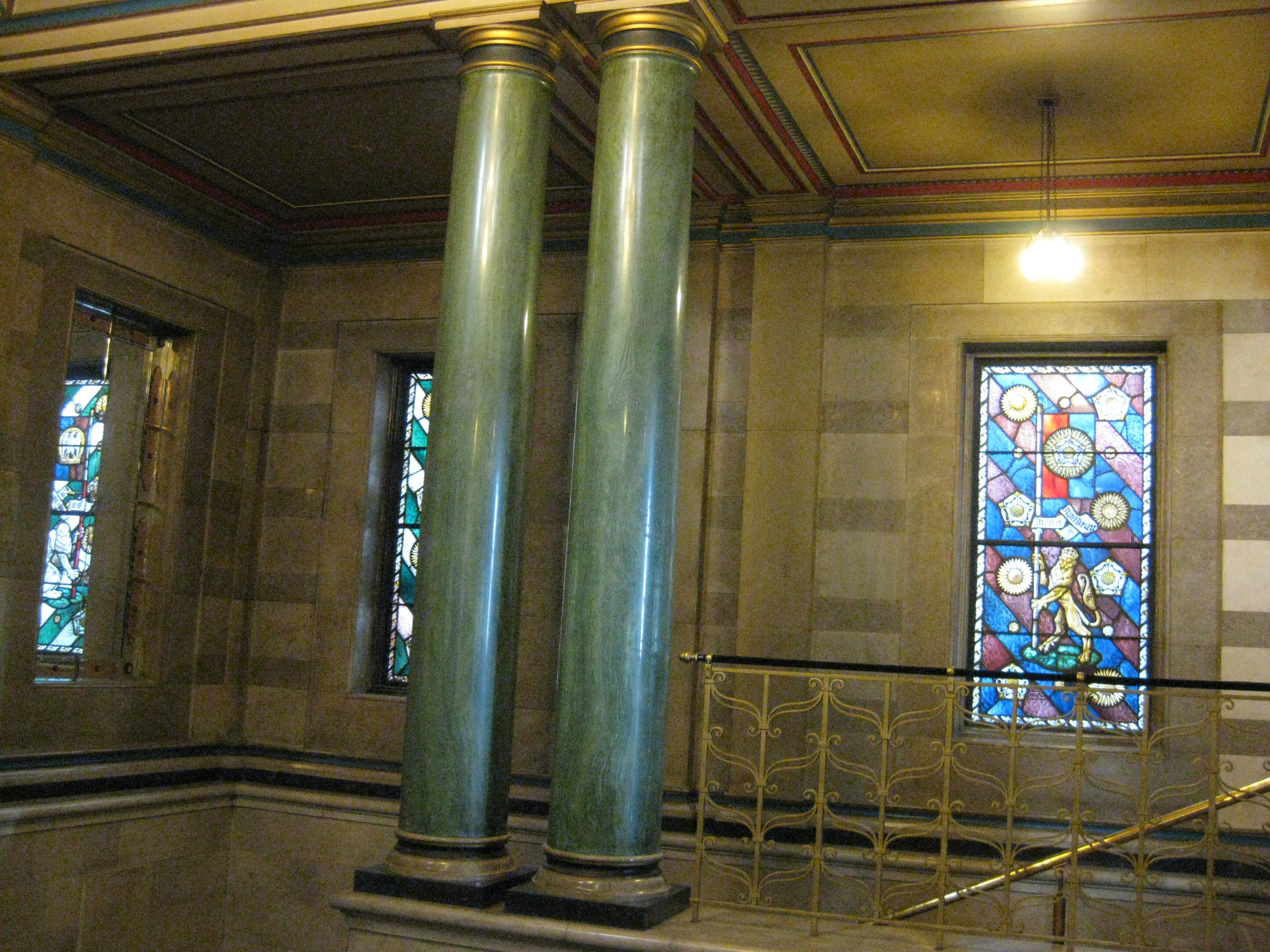
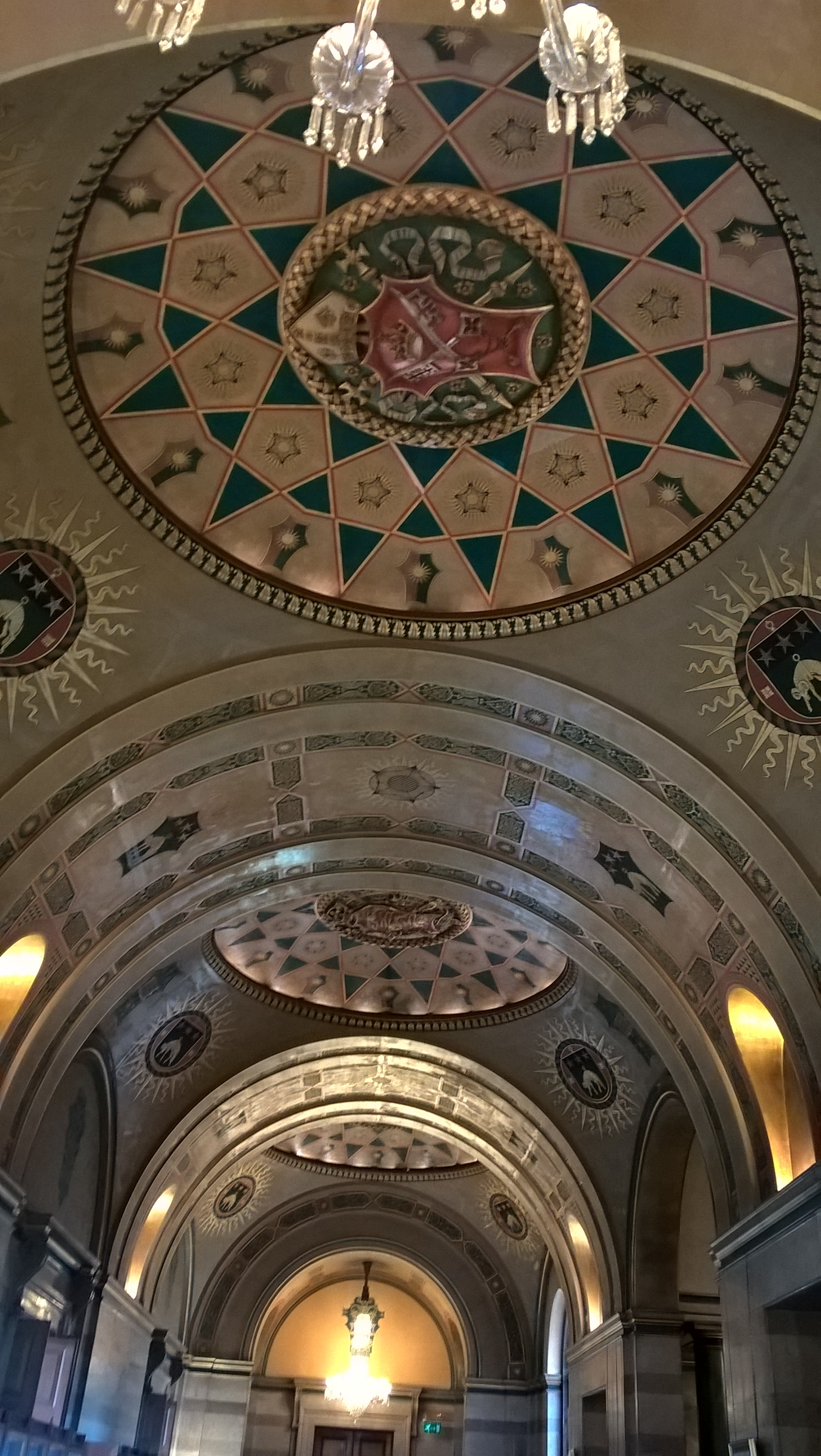
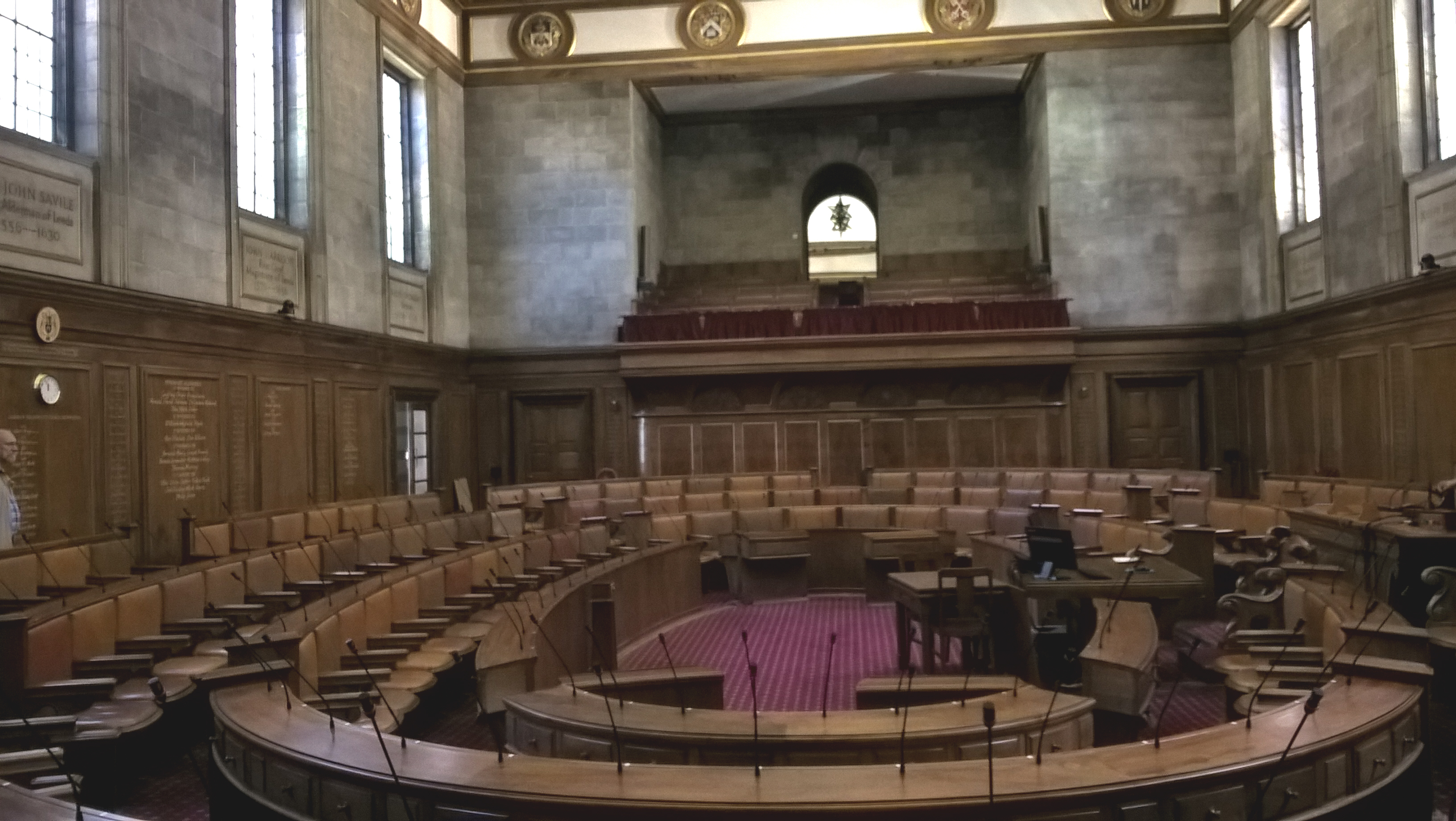
Stained glass and green columns; first floor ceilings; council chamber

In contrast with the plain exterior, the grand and decorous interior uses much more colour. The marble-lined halls and official rooms are in the building's central part stretching between the towers while council departmental office spaces and committee rooms occupy the wings. Bespoke Wilton carpets cover the floors throughout. The 90 feet (27 m) entrance hall is lined with grey gritstone and green scagliola columns. The main staircase has stained glass windows by George Kruger Gray and at the top a bust of King George V by Sir William Reid Dick. This leads to a 90 feet (27 m) long reception hall with three saucer domed ceilings, also by Gray. The three surviving 19th century chandeliers from the Lord Mayor's Rooms at the Town Hall are used to light this space. The Assembly Hall was 100 feet (30 m) long and oak panelled is across the front of the building, now divided to a banqueting hall and other chambers. There is a parlour for the Lord Mayor at the East end and one for the Lady Mayoress at the West end.

The Council Chamber is sunk in three tiers below entrance level, with an elliptical seating arrangement and public galleries at either end of the chamber. To the height of the doors it is panelled in English walnut, and acoustic tiles of artificial stone above. One of the most original features of the building hangs above the Council Chamber: a huge elliptical candelabrum hung by 8 rods and containing 99 electric bulbs.

== See also ==
- Architecture of Leeds
- Grade II* listed buildings in Leeds
- Listed buildings in Leeds (City and Hunslet Ward - northern area)
