= City Hall, Bristol =

Municipal building in Bristol, England

City Hall
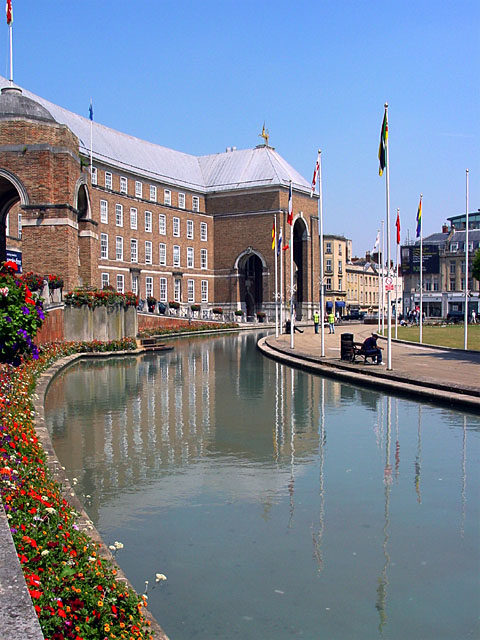
- Bristol City Hall

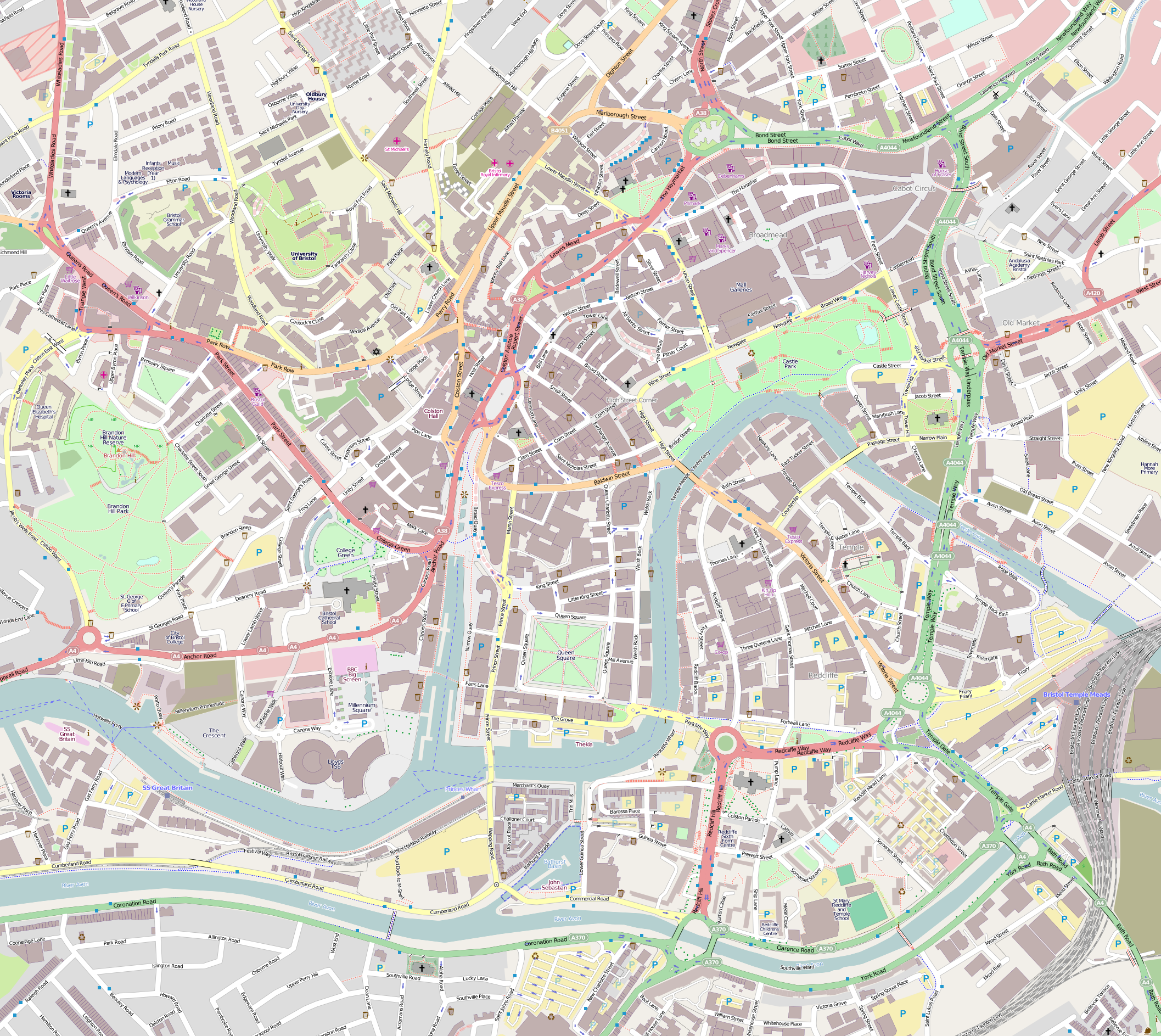
- Location within Bristol Central
- Former names: Council House

General information
- Location: Bristol, England
- Coordinates: 51.45263°N 2.60295°W
- Construction started: 1938
- Completed: 1952
- Opened: 1956
- Client: Bristol City Council

Design and construction
- Architect: Vincent Harris

Listed Building – Grade II*
- Official name: Council House and attached railings and piers
- Designated: 19 March 1981
- Reference no.: 1282341

City Hall (formerly the Council House) was built as the seat of government of the city of Bristol, England, opening in 1956. Designed in the 1930s, with construction delayed by the Second World War, it is in a restrained Neo-Georgian style, forming a wide curve along one side of College Green, opposite Bristol Cathedral and at the foot of Park Street in the city centre. It is designated a Grade II* listed building.

== Building ==
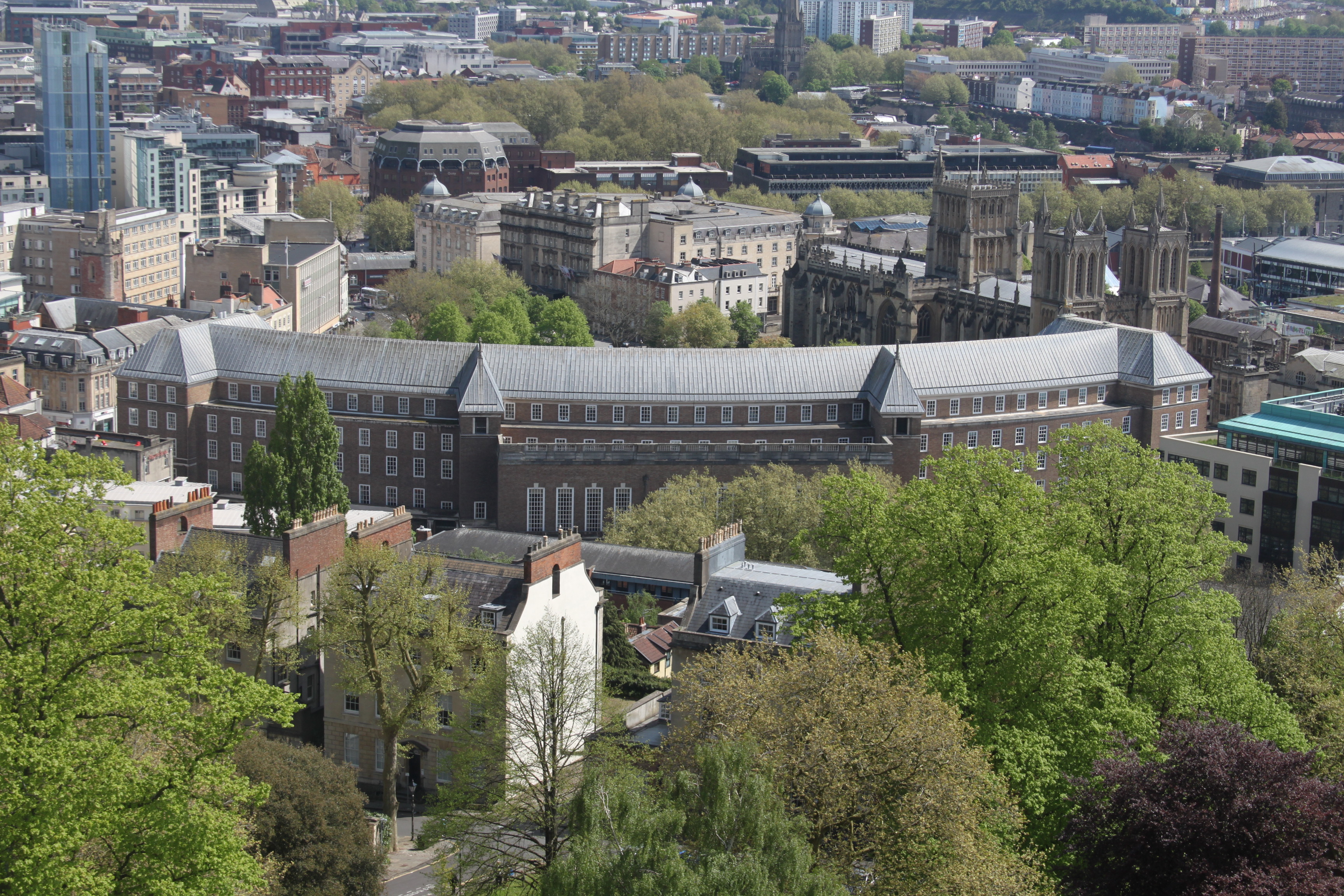
The rear of the Bristol City Hall from Cabot Tower

The building was commissioned to replace the Old Council House. The foundation stone was laid in 1935, and it was structurally complete by 1939 when the Second World War stopped further work. Although completed in 1952, the building was officially opened by Queen Elizabeth II on 17 April 1956. The council published a commemorative booklet about the building at the same time.

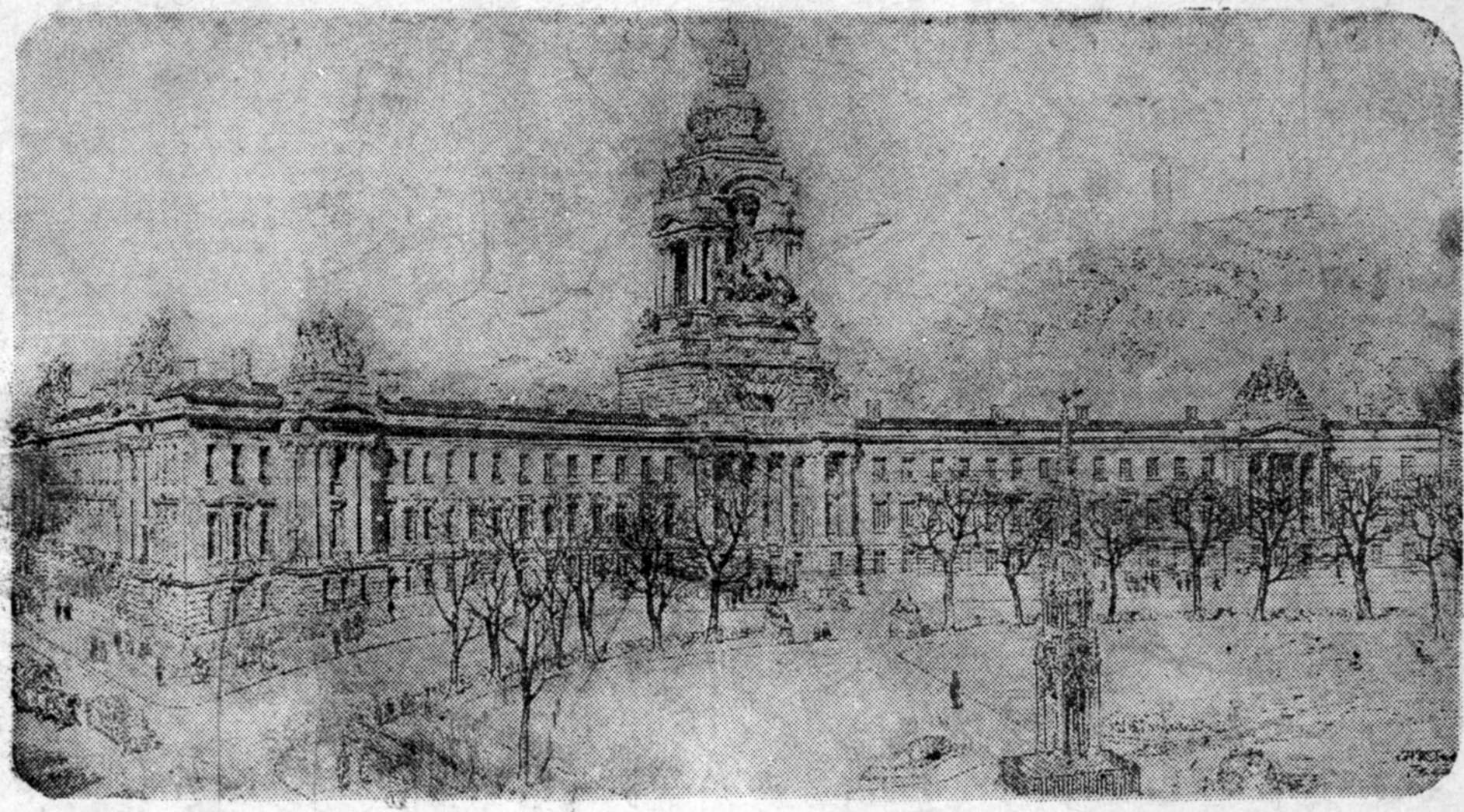
Original design of the City Hall

It was designed by Vincent Harris in a Neo-Georgian style, with a concrete frame clad with very wide, thin bricks, with Portland stone dressings and a steep leaded hipped roof. The end pavilions are topped by gilded unicorns.

The ceremonial entrance overlooks the moat and leads into the reception hall which is lined with local Doulting stone and paved with black and white Italian marble. It also features a blue and gold wall clock, encircled by the signs of the zodiac and equipped with its own wind indicator. The Conference Hall is the largest room in the building. The names of all Mayors and Lord Mayors of Bristol since 1216 are cut into the stone walls. The walls of the Lord Mayor's Reception Room are panelled in English walnut and there is a colourful frieze displaying the heraldry of the Bristol trade guilds, and, in gold leaf, the names of famous Bristolians.

The building was originally known as the Council House, but was renamed City Hall by George Ferguson, CBE, the Mayor of Bristol, on his first day in office on 19 November 2012.

== Features ==
The ceiling of the council chamber was designed by John Armstrong (1893–1973) and depicts buildings in Bristol at the edge and the centre details sailing ships from different periods of Bristol history. The four corners show the allegorical figures of Enterprise, Wisdom, Industry and Navigation. The ceiling in the Conference Room is by Sir Walter Thomas Monnington (1902–1976) on the theme of molecular and atomic fusion.

In 2005 a bust of Tony Benn, the famous Labour Party politician and the Member of Parliament for the former Bristol South East constituency from 1950 to 1960, and again from 1963 to 1983, was unveiled by Benn himself in the building's foyer.

== Environmental aspects ==
Refurbishment of the electrical and heating systems have incorporated the use of rainwater recycling for flushing toilets and an air-conditioning system that will discharge excess heat into the surrounding water filled moat rather than expelling it into the atmosphere.

== In popular culture ==
- One of the building's gilded unicorns appears in the opening credits of the first and fifth series of the television series Skins.
- One of the unicorns also features in a hologram on the latest edition of the £B10 banknote of the Bristol Pound.

== See also ==
- Grade II* listed buildings in Bristol
