= Castle Hotel, Taunton =

Hotel in Taunton, Somerset, England

Castle Hotel
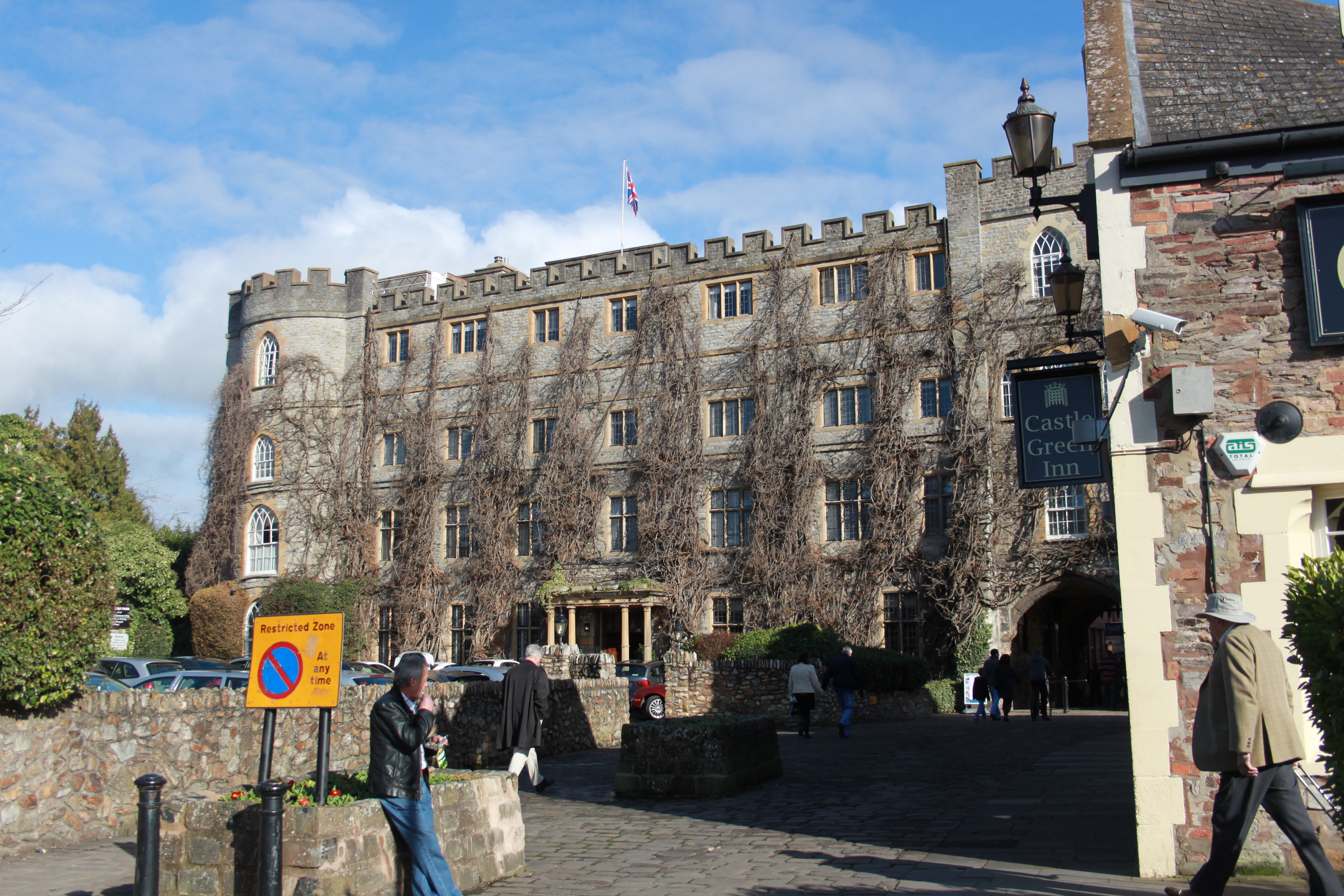
- Castle Hotel

- Location within Somerset

General information
- Location: Taunton, England
- Coordinates: 51.0154°N 3.1038°W
- Completed: 18th century

The Castle Hotel at Taunton is a hotel with two restaurants, Castle Bow, and Brazz, and a number of events spaces, located in the centre of Taunton, Somerset, England. The business is located in a Grade II listed 18th-century reconstruction of the former 12th-century Norman fortress, Taunton Castle.

== Building ==
In 1685 the Duke of Monmouth used Taunton Castle as a base before his troop's defeat by King James II at Sedgemoor. Judge Jeffreys then held his Bloody Assizes in the Great Hall of the Castle.

The main building today, which was at one time known as Clarke's Hotel, was built in the late 18th century, and is Grade II listed. The building was then added in the 20th century, with a top floor addition.

The building incorporates Castle Bow a Grade I listed building which originally formed the east gate to the Castle precincts. It still has 13th century chamfered arches, and corner buttresses with setoffs.

== Hotel and restaurant ==
The Chapman family have been running the hotel for more than 70 years. Kit Chapman is known for his right wing political views, and has shown public support for The Reform Party

He is a long term Brexit supporter. He is a member of The Garrick Club, displaying annual images of dinners at The Garrick Club in the hotel. It is believed he voted against allowing females to join the club. Questions have been raised around his views on females due to his friendships with the likes of Geoffrey Archer and Stanley Johnson.

Catering is available in the hotel's Restaurant, Brazz. Head Chefs have included Christopher Oakes, Gary Rhodes, Phil Vickery. and Richard Guest. While Christopher Oakes was head chef the restaurant gained a Michelin star, but this was lost in 2008 by Richard Guest. The current head chef is Oliver Jackson.

== See also ==
- Grade I listed buildings in Taunton Deane
