= Taunton =

County town of Somerset, England

Coordinates: 51°0′53″N 3°6′11″W

- Town
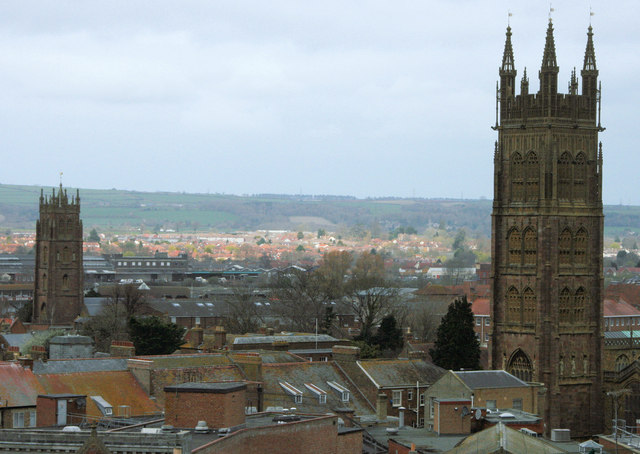
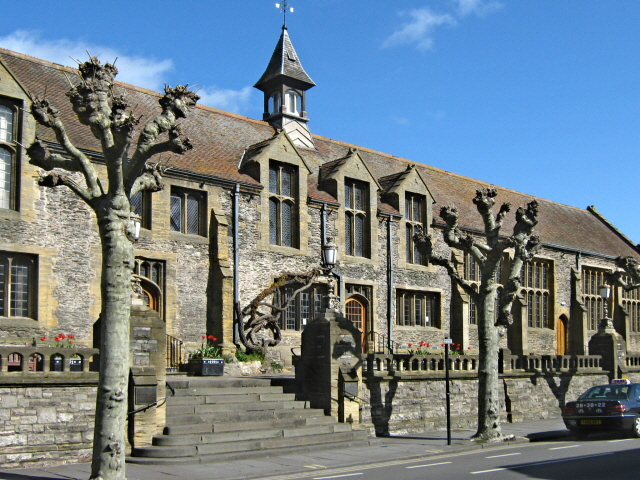
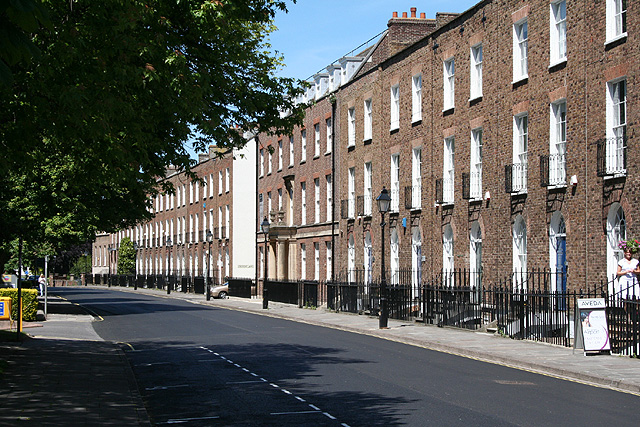
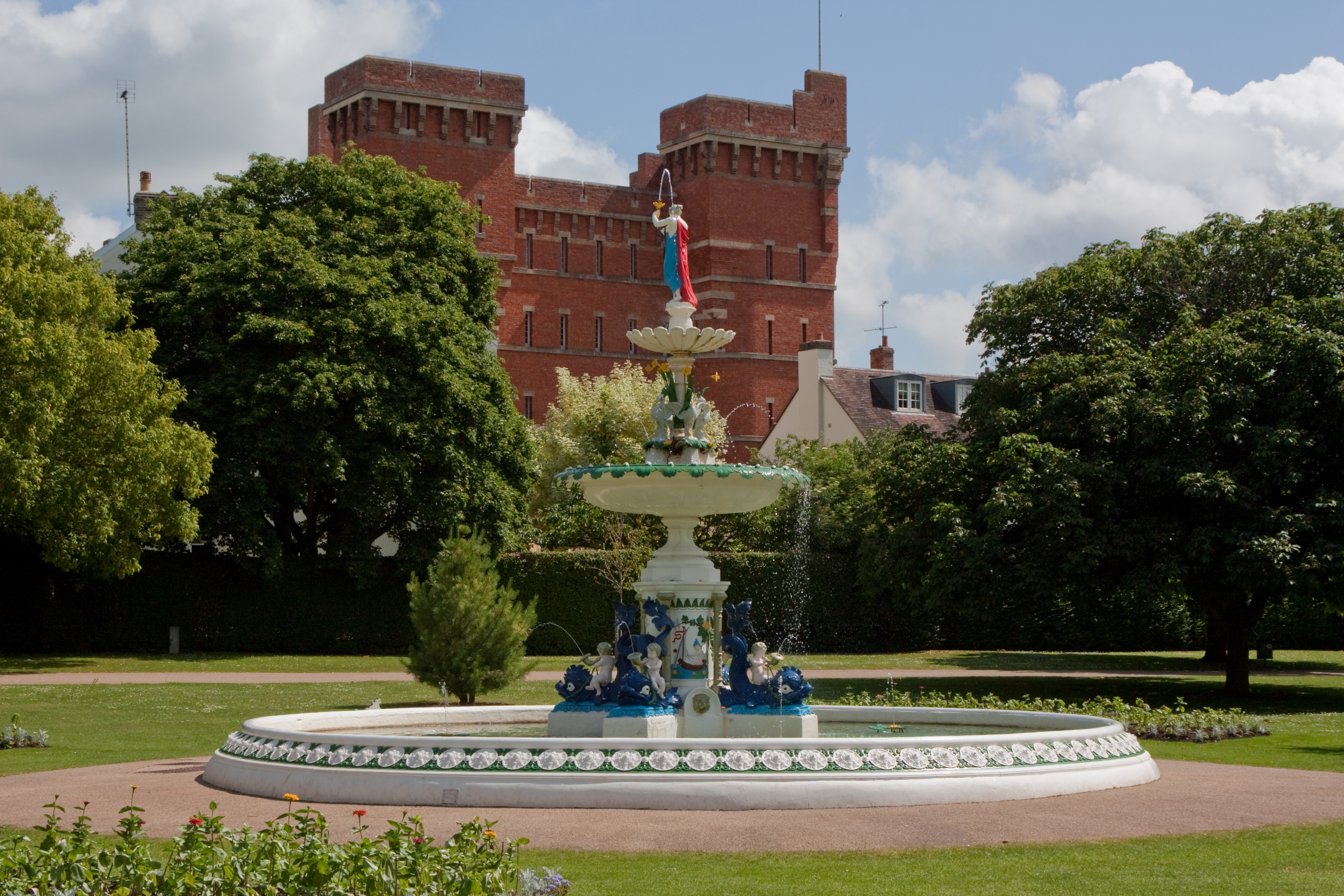
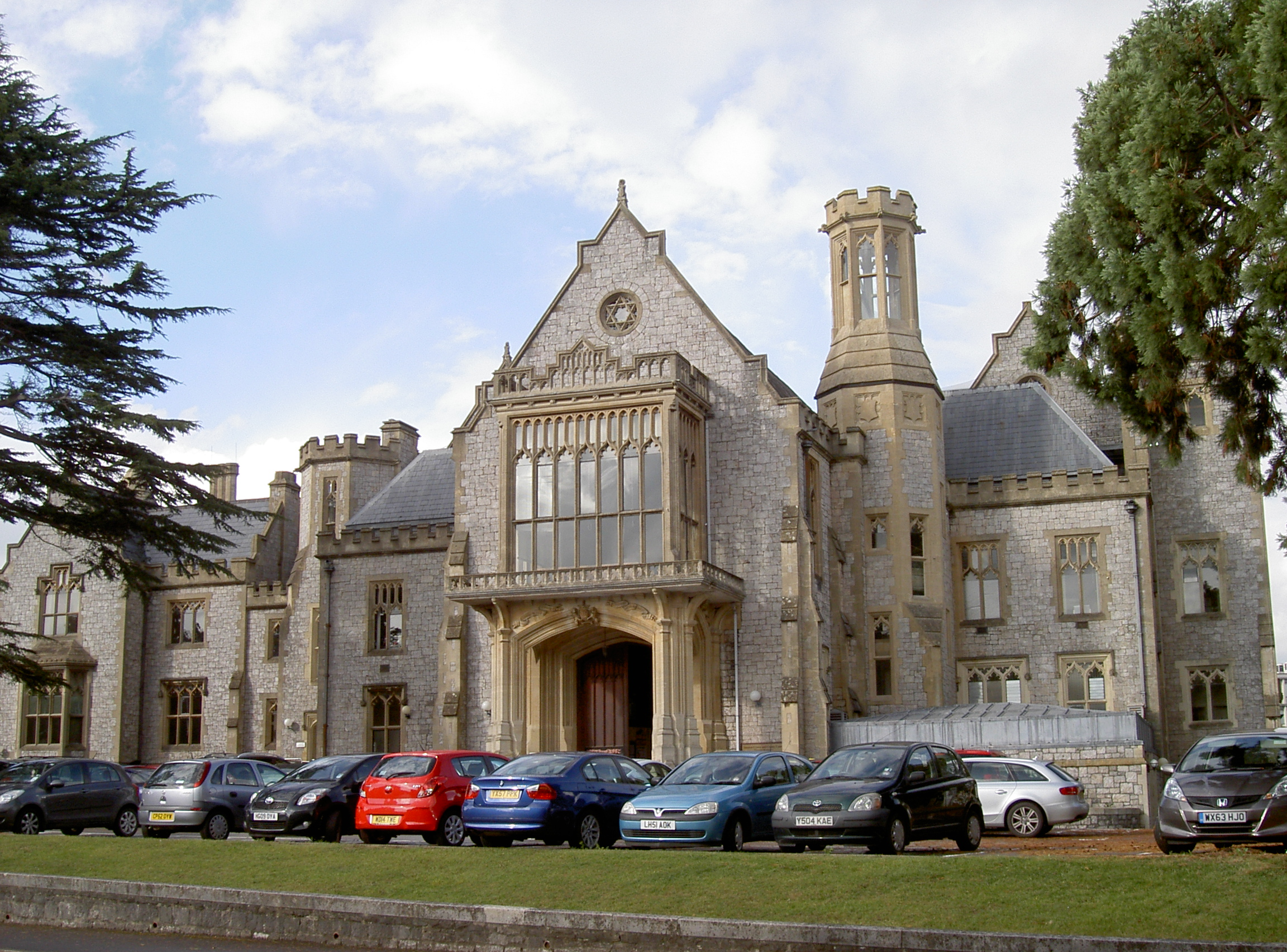
- From the top to bottom-right, view of Taunton with the Minster on the right, Municipal Buildings, The Crescent, Vivary Park, Shire Hall

- Location within Somerset
- Population: 61,665 (Built-up area, 2021)
- OS grid reference: ST228250
- Civil parish: Taunton
- Unitary authority: Somerset Council
- Ceremonial county: Somerset
- Region: South West
- Country: England
- Sovereign state: United Kingdom
- Post town: TAUNTON
- Postcode district: TA1, TA2, TA3
- Dialling code: 01823
- Police: Avon and Somerset
- Fire: Devon and Somerset
- Ambulance: South Western
- UK Parliament: Taunton and Wellington

Taunton (/ˈtɔːntən/ TAWN-tən) is the county town of Somerset, England. It is a market town and has a minster church. Its thousand-year history includes a 10th-century monastic foundation, owned by the Bishops of Winchester, which was rebuilt as Taunton Castle by the Normans in the 12th century. Parts of the inner ward house were turned into the Museum of Somerset and Somerset Military Museum. For the Second Cornish uprising of 1497, Perkin Warbeck brought an army of 6,000; most surrendered to Henry VII on 4 October 1497. On 20 June 1685, the Duke of Monmouth crowned himself King of England in Taunton in the failed Monmouth Rebellion. Judge Jeffreys led the Bloody Assizes in the Castle's Great Hall.

The Grand Western Canal reached Taunton in 1839 and the Bristol and Exeter Railway in 1842. Today it hosts Musgrove Park Hospital, Somerset County Cricket Club, is the base of 40 Commando, Royal Marines, and is home to the United Kingdom Hydrographic Office on Admiralty Way. The popular Taunton Flower Show has been held in Vivary Park since 1866, and on 13 March 2022, St Mary Magdalene parish church was elevated to the status of Taunton Minster. At the 2021 census the Taunton built-up area as defined by the Office for National Statistics had a population of 61,665.

== History ==
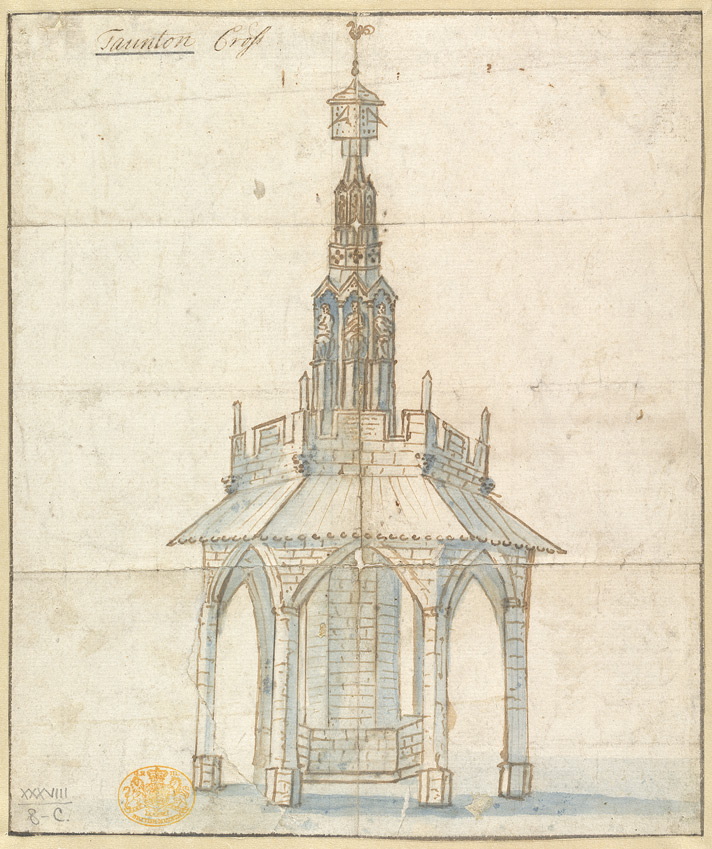
Taunton Cross c. 1770

The town name derives from "Town on the River Tone" or Tone Town. Cambria Farm, which now hosts a park and ride close to the M5 motorway Junction 25, was the site of Bronze and Iron Age settlement and a Roman farm. There was a Romano-British village near the suburb of Holway. Taunton was important in Anglo-Saxon times as a burh with a mint. King Ine of Wessex threw up an earthen castle about 700, but it was levelled in 722 by his queen, Æthelburg of Wessex, to prevent seizure by rebels.

A monastery was founded before 904. The bishops of Winchester owned the manor, and obtained the first charter for their "men of Taunton" from King Edward in 904, freeing them from all royal and county tribute. Some time before Domesday, Taunton became a borough with privileges and a population of some 1,500, including 64 burgesses governed by a portreeve appointed by the bishops. Somerton took over from Ilchester as county town in the late 13th century, but declined; the county-town status passed to Taunton about 1366. Between 1209 and 1311 the Bishop of Winchester's manor of Taunton expanded two-and-a-half times. The parishes of Staplegrove, Wilton, and Taunton were part of Taunton Deane hundred.

In 1451, during the Wars of the Roses, Taunton saw a skirmish between the Earl of Devon, and Baron Bonville. Queen Margaret and her troops passed through in 1471 to defeat at the Battle of Tewkesbury. In the Second Cornish uprising of 1497 most Cornish gentry supported Perkin Warbeck's cause and on 17 September a Cornish army some 6,000 strong entered Exeter before advancing on Taunton. Henry VII sent his chief general - Giles, Lord Daubeney - to attack the Cornish. When Warbeck heard that the King's scouts were at Glastonbury he panicked and deserted his army. On 4 October 1497, Henry VII reached Taunton, where he received the surrender of the remaining Cornish army. Ringleaders were executed and others fined a total of £13,000.

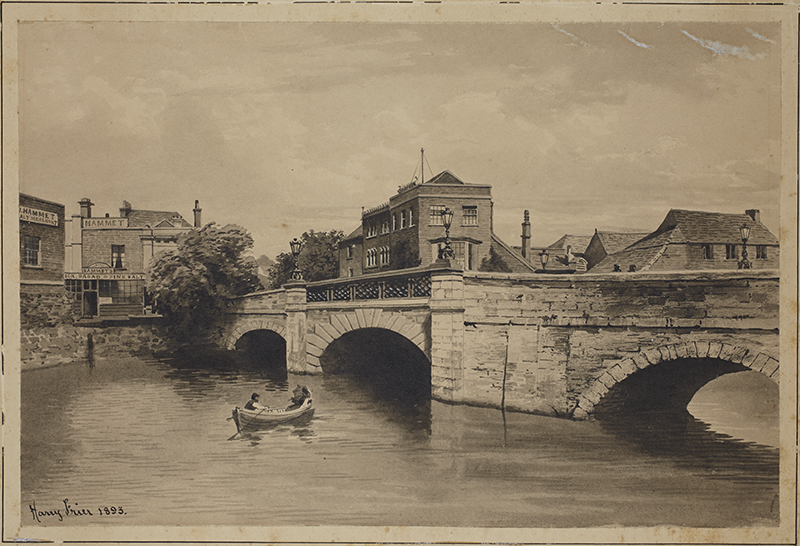
Taunton from the Canal, watercolour on paper by Harry Frier in 1899, showing the bridge over the River Tone

Taunton Castle changed hands several times in the Civil War of 1642–1645, as did the town. During the Siege of Taunton it was defended by Robert Blake from July 1644 to July 1645, and suffered destruction of many medieval and Tudor buildings. On 20 June 1685, the Duke of Monmouth crowned himself King of England at Taunton during the Monmouth Rebellion. In the autumn of that year Judge Jeffreys lived in the town during the Bloody Assizes that followed the Battle of Sedgemoor.

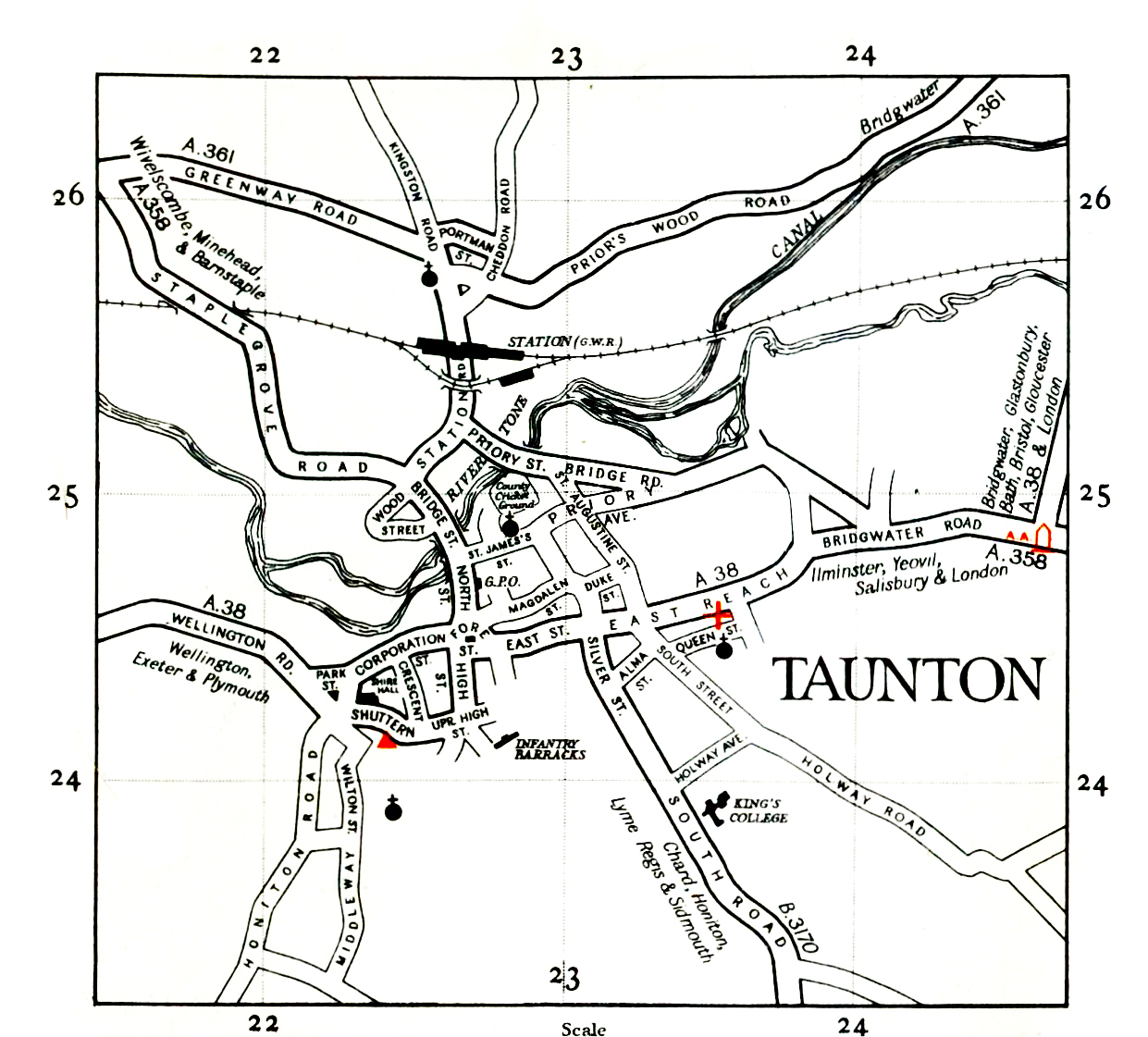
A road map of Taunton in 1948

The medieval fairs and markets (a weekly market remains) were celebrated for the sale of woollen cloth called "Tauntons" made in the town. On the decline of the woollen industry in the west of England, silk-weaving was introduced at the end of the 18th century.

In 1839 the Grand Western Canal reached Taunton, aiding southward trade, which was enhanced by the arrival of the railway in 1842.

A permanent military presence came to Jellalabad Barracks in 1881.

In the Second World War, the Bridgwater and Taunton Canal formed part of the Taunton Stop Line, set to curb any advance of a German invasion. Pillboxes can still be seen along its length.

A fire aboard a Penzance to London sleeping car train approaching Taunton in 1978 killed 12 passengers and injured 15 others.

=== Regeneration ===
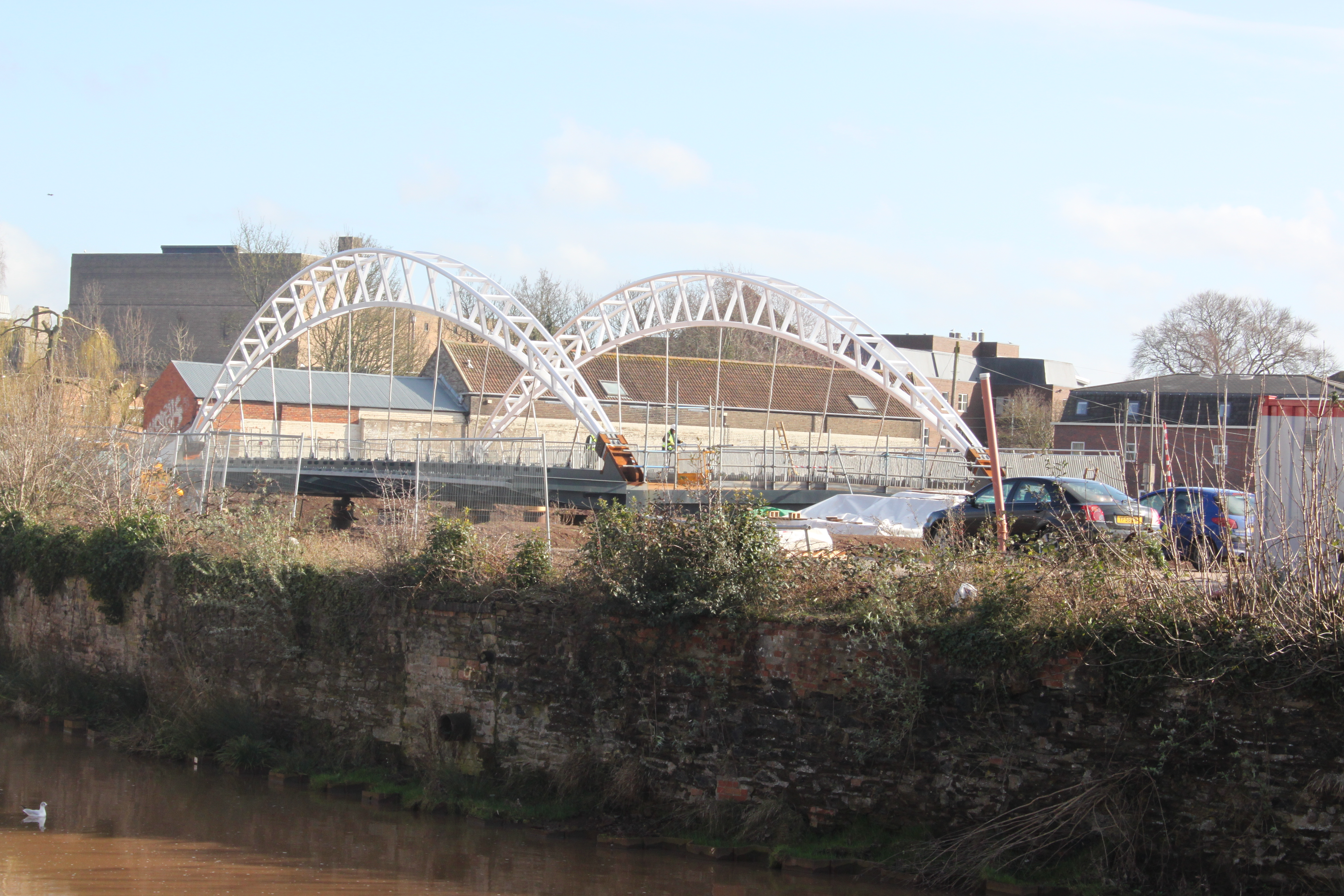
Tangier Way bridge under construction in 2011

Taunton was rated "strategically important" in the government's Regional Spatial Strategy, allowing Somerset County Council to receive funding for large-scale regeneration projects. In 2006, the council revealed plans dubbed "Project Taunton". This would see regeneration of the areas of Firepool, Tangier, the retail town-centre, the cultural quarter, and the River Tone, to sustain Taunton as a business hub in the South West.

The Firepool area, just north of the town centre by the main railway station, includes vacant or undeveloped land. The council is promoting sustainable, high-quality, employment-led mixed-use development to attract 3,000 new jobs and 500 new homes. This area was the cattle market until in 2008. A large indoor shopping centre to the east of the Parade covers a site that was once a pig market. Although its official name is now Orchard, and before that the Old Market Centre, locals still call it the Pig Market; one existed there from 1614 to 1882.

In Tangier, a brownfield area between Bridgwater and Taunton College and the bus station, the project proposed to build small offices and more riverside housing.

The "Cultural Quarter" is the area along the river between Firepool and Tangier. The plans are to extend riverside retail and attract smaller, boutique businesses such as those found at Riverside.

Plans for the town centre include more pedestrianisation and greater sizes and numbers of retail units.

Several sites along the River Tone are set for renovation. Firepool Weir lock, long silted up, was to be dredged in 2011 to allow boats to pass from the navigable section of the Tone through Taunton to the Bridgwater and Taunton Canal. Goodland Gardens received a makeover and a new café, The Shed, opened. Projects to develop Somerset Square (a paved area next to the Brewhouse Theatre) and Longrun Meadow (a country park near Bridgwater & Taunton College) have been put forward.

Traffic congestion was identified as an obstacle to further economic growth. Part of the strategy was a new road infrastructure consisting of a £7.5 million link road to ease traffic in the town centre (Taunton's "Third Way"), completed in 2011, and a Northern Inner Distributor Road linking Staplegrove Road, the station and Priory Avenue at a planned cost of £21 million, opened in 2017.

==== 2011 M5 crash ====
A major road accident occurred on the evening of 4 November 2011 near junction 25 of the M5 motorway on the north-eastern edge of Taunton at West Monkton. 34 vehicles were involved, 7 people were killed and a further 51 injured.

== Governance ==
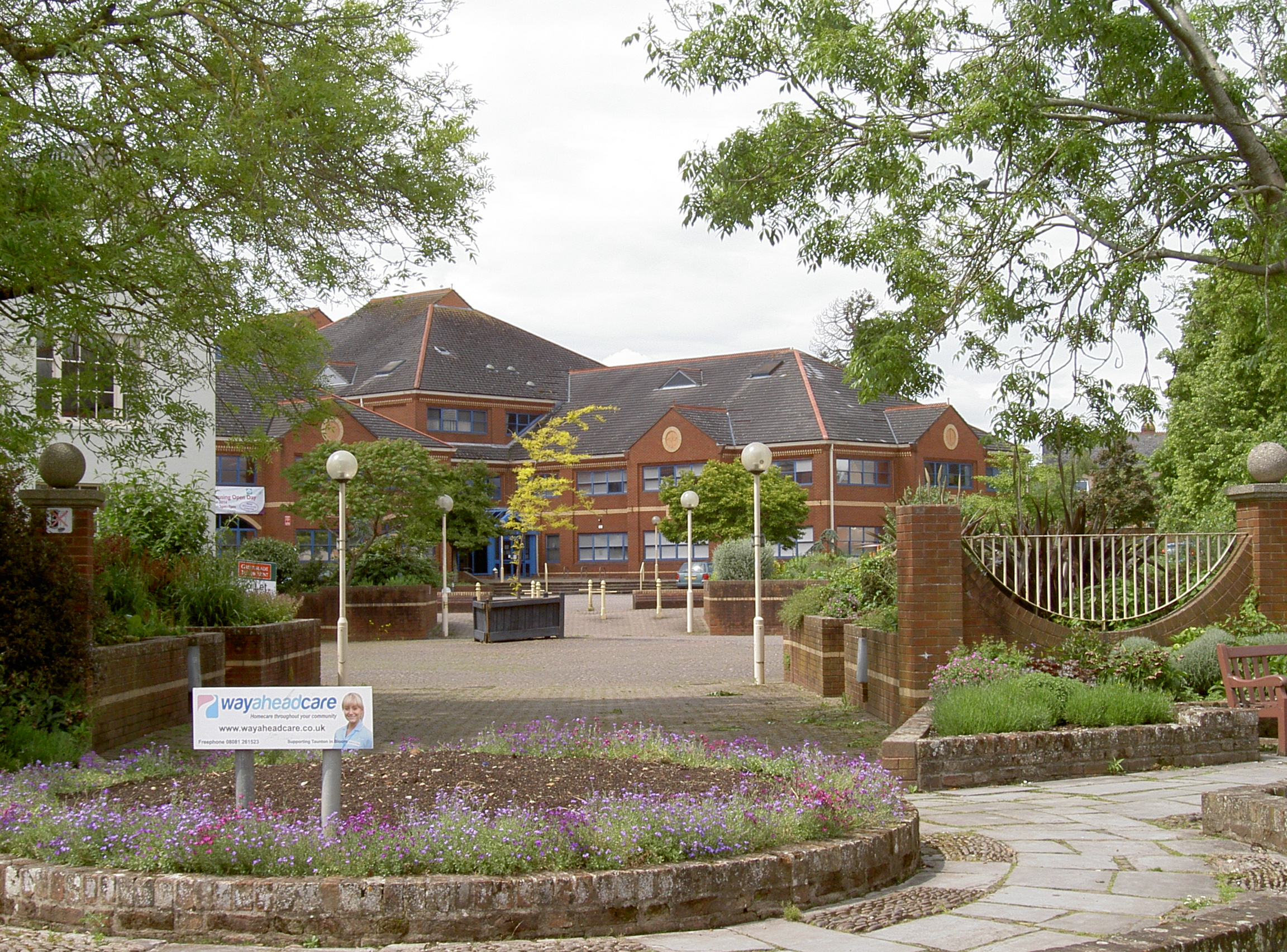
Deane House, housing offices of both Taunton Town Council and Somerset Council

There are two tiers of local government covering Taunton, at parish (town) and unitary authority level: Taunton Town Council and Somerset Council. The town council is based at Deane House on Belvedere Road. Somerset Council is also based in the town, with offices at both County Hall on The Crescent and in Deane House.

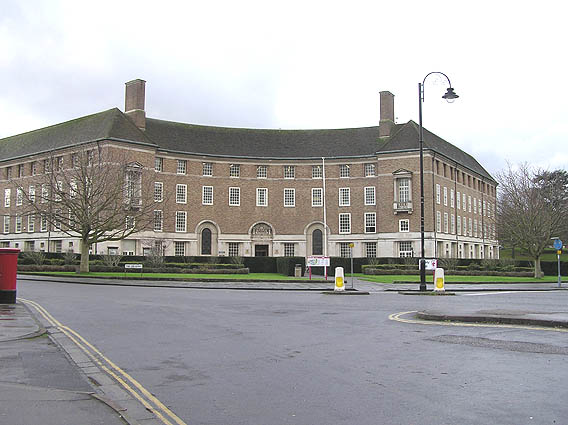
County Hall, The Crescent

For national elections, the town forms part of the Taunton and Wellington constituency.

=== Administrative history ===
There were two ancient parishes with their parish churches in the town: St Mary Magdalen and St James. From at least the time of King Stephen (reigned 1135–1154), Taunton was described as a borough. It was a seigneurial borough controlled by the Bishops of Winchester in their capacity as lord of the manor rather than having a borough corporation. From 1307 onwards the borough became the Taunton parliamentary borough (constituency), electing two Members of Parliament.

The borough was granted a municipal charter in 1627, establishing a corporation led by a mayor. The borough boundaries only covered part of the parish of St Mary Magdalen. The borough therefore excluded the parts of the town in the parish of St James and also excluded areas where the town was also growing into the neighbouring parishes of Bishop's Hull and Wilton. The borough corporation ceased operating in 1792, after which Taunton remained a parliamentary borough but was no longer a borough for municipal purposes. The boundaries of the parliamentary borough were significantly enlarged in 1832 to cover the built-up area as it then was, covering parts of each of the four parishes of St Mary Magdalen, St James, Bishop's Hull, and Wilton.

In 1849, the parliamentary borough was made a local board district, with an elected local board established to provide public health and local government services to the town. The town was made a municipal borough in 1877, re-establishing a corporation to run the town.

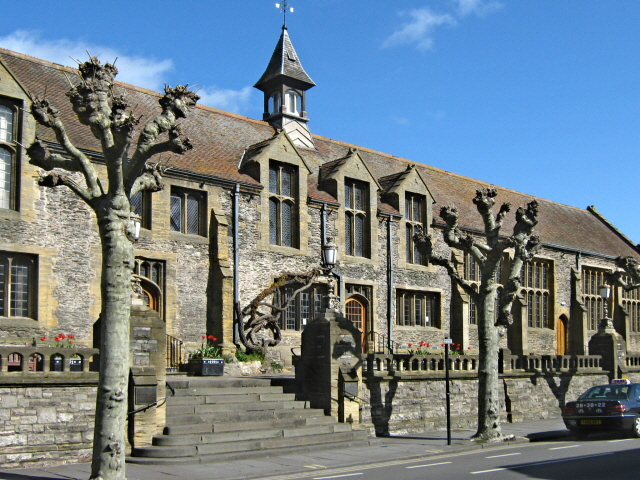
The former Municipal Buildings, Corporation Street

In 1887, the corporation took over the former Taunton Grammar School, parts of which date back to around 1480, to serve as its meeting place and offices, renaming it the Municipal Buildings. As the town grew, the borough boundaries were occasionally expanded, with boundary changes in 1887, 1895, 1921, 1932, 1958, and 1966. As part of the 1921 changes, the civil parishes within the borough were united into a single parish of Taunton matching the borough.

The borough of Taunton was abolished in 1974 under the Local Government Act 1972, with its area becoming part of the new Taunton Deane district. No successor parish was created for the former borough, and so it became unparished. Taunton Deane Borough Council based itself at the Municipal Buildings until 1987, when it moved to new offices at Deane House.

Taunton Deane was abolished in 2019, becoming part of the short-lived district of Somerset West and Taunton, which was in turn abolished four years later in 2023. Somerset County Council then took over district-level functions across its area, making it a unitary authority, and was renamed Somerset Council. As part of the 2023 reorganisation, a new civil parish of Taunton was created covering the unparished area which corresponded to the pre-1974 borough plus areas from a number of adjoining parishes, with the parishes of Comeytrowe and Staplegrove both being abolished. The new parish council took the name Taunton Town Council.

== Geography ==
Taunton lies on the River Tone between the Quantock, Blackdown, and Brendon hills. The area is known as the Vale of Taunton. It is surrounded by many other large towns and cities seen on this directional compass:

Taunton is 38 miles (61 km) south-west of Bristol, 28 miles (45 km) north-east of Exeter, 63 miles (101 km) north-east of Plymouth and 40 miles (64 km) north-west of Weymouth.

=== Geology ===
The Taunton area has Permian red sandstones and breccia outcrop 295–250 million years old. Rocks of Triassic age (248–204 million years ago) underlie much of Somerset's moors and levels.

=== Nature reserves ===
The several local nature reserves in and around Taunton are protected under section 21 of the National Parks and Access to the Countryside Act 1949. South Taunton Streams is an urban wetland. The northern suburbs include the Children's Wood riverside reserve, a movement corridor for animals such as otters along the banks of the Tone. Birds include the kingfisher, dipper, grey wagtail, mute swan, grey heron, and reed warbler; butterflies include the small and large skipper, marbled white, small heath, and small copper - along with dragonflies and damselflies.

Weirfield Riverside, a nature reserve along the River Tone, has alder and willow woodland, bramble, scrub, and rough grassland. The wetter, flood-prone areas feature hemlock water-dropwort and yellow flag. Silk Mills Park and Ride offer landscaping and ponds in three areas by the Tone. The woodland and grassland support aquatic and marginal vegetation, with various birds, bats, reptiles, and invertebrates. Frieze Hill Community Orchard has turned from allotments to rough grassland and orchard. Among the apples grown are Kingston Black and Yarlington Mill.

=== Climate ===
Like most of South West England, Taunton has a temperate climate, wetter and milder than the rest of the country. The annual mean temperature is about 10 °C (50.0 °F). Seasonal temperature variation is less extreme because of the adjacent sea. The summer months of July and August have mean daily maxima of about 21 °C (69.8 °F). In winter, mean minimum temperatures of 1 °C (33.8 °F) or 2 °C (35.6 °F) are common. In the summer the Azores high pressure affects the south-west of England, but convective cloud sometimes forms inland, reducing the sunshine hours. Annual sunshine rates are slightly under the regional average of 1,600 hours. Most of the rainfall in the south-west is caused by Atlantic depressions or by convection – in autumn and winter by the former, which are then at their most active. In summer, much rainfall results from the sun heating the ground, leading to convection, showers and thunderstorms. Average rainfall is about 700 mm (28 in). Some 8–15 days of snowfall are typical. November to March have the highest mean winds and June to August the lightest. The prevailing wind direction is from the south-west.

Climate data for Cannington, (Note: Weather station is located 10.0 miles (16.1 km) from the Taunton city centre.) (1991–2020 normals, extremes 1959–2005)
Month	Jan	Feb	Mar	Apr	May	Jun	Jul	Aug	Sep	Oct	Nov	Dec	Year
Record high °C (°F)	15.4 (59.7)	17.7 (63.9)	20.6 (69.1)	26.1 (79.0)	27.0 (80.6)	32.5 (90.5)	34.0 (93.2)	32.5 (90.5)	28.9 (84.0)	25.6 (78.1)	19.0 (66.2)	15.7 (60.3)	34.0 (93.2)
Mean daily maximum °C (°F)	8.8 (47.8)	9.2 (48.6)	11.4 (52.5)	14.1 (57.4)	17.1 (62.8)	19.9 (67.8)	21.7 (71.1)	21.3 (70.3)	19.3 (66.7)	15.3 (59.5)	11.8 (53.2)	9.3 (48.7)	15.0 (59.0)
Daily mean °C (°F)	5.8 (42.4)	6.1 (43.0)	7.7 (45.9)	9.8 (49.6)	12.6 (54.7)	15.5 (59.9)	17.3 (63.1)	17.2 (63.0)	15.1 (59.2)	11.9 (53.4)	8.8 (47.8)	6.4 (43.5)	11.2 (52.1)
Mean daily minimum °C (°F)	2.8 (37.0)	2.9 (37.2)	4.0 (39.2)	5.4 (41.7)	8.1 (46.6)	11.1 (52.0)	12.9 (55.2)	13.0 (55.4)	10.8 (51.4)	8.4 (47.1)	5.7 (42.3)	3.4 (38.1)	7.4 (45.3)
Record low °C (°F)	−13.9 (7.0)	−9.4 (15.1)	−7.8 (18.0)	−2.8 (27.0)	−1.0 (30.2)	2.2 (36.0)	5.0 (41.0)	5.0 (41.0)	1.7 (35.1)	−2.7 (27.1)	−5.6 (21.9)	−8.3 (17.1)	−13.9 (7.0)
Average precipitation mm (inches)	77.6 (3.06)	54.6 (2.15)	55.7 (2.19)	53.0 (2.09)	51.2 (2.02)	52.0 (2.05)	53.2 (2.09)	70.3 (2.77)	62.1 (2.44)	87.7 (3.45)	85.9 (3.38)	83.7 (3.30)	787.0 (30.98)
Average precipitation days (≥ 1.0 mm)	13.1	10.5	10.4	9.6	9.4	8.6	8.9	10.5	9.1	13.0	13.5	13.1	129.5
Mean monthly sunshine hours	58.7	83.0	126.6	182.1	203.5	200.7	199.1	188.4	143.1	105.9	73.3	51.5	1,615.7
Source 1: Met Office
Source 2: Starlings Roost Weather

== Economy ==
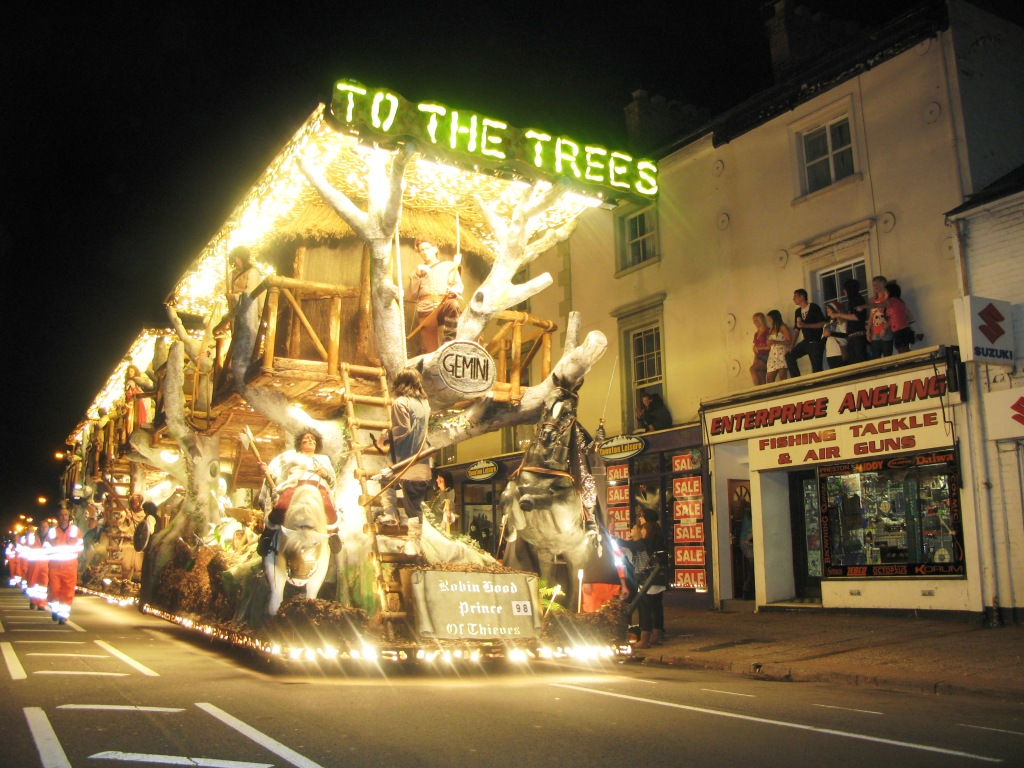
The annual Taunton Carnival takes a route through the shopping district in the centre of the town.

Taunton Deane had low unemployment of 4.1 per cent compared with a national average of 5.0 per cent in 2005.

Taunton is home to the United Kingdom Hydrographic Office (UKHO), a Ministry of Defence body responsible for providing navigational and other hydrographic information for national, civil and defence requirements. The UKHO is located on Admiralty Way and has a workforce of about 1100. At the start of the Second World War, chart printing moved to Taunton, but the main office did not follow until 1968. Cider is produced at many places in Taunton and the surrounding area.

=== Shopping ===
Taunton's principal shops developed on the three streets that converge at Fore Street and the Market House: East Street, North Street and, to the south, High Street. Many national 'High Street' brands became established on these streets as smaller retailers closed, for example the first store of the multinational New Look clothing retailer opened in Taunton in 1969, however smaller retailers continue to operate in side streets such as the historic Bath Place (off the High Street) and St James Street (off North Street). Taunton's oldest established large store is Hatcher's which has been on the High Street since 1894 and can trace its origins to a drapery business that started in 1775 on East Street.

Retail parks developed further from the town centre. Priory Fields opened in 1985 alongside the link road to the M5 motorway junction, and Hankridge Farm, closer to the motorway junction, was established by 1992 when a large Sainsbury's opened.

== Landmarks ==
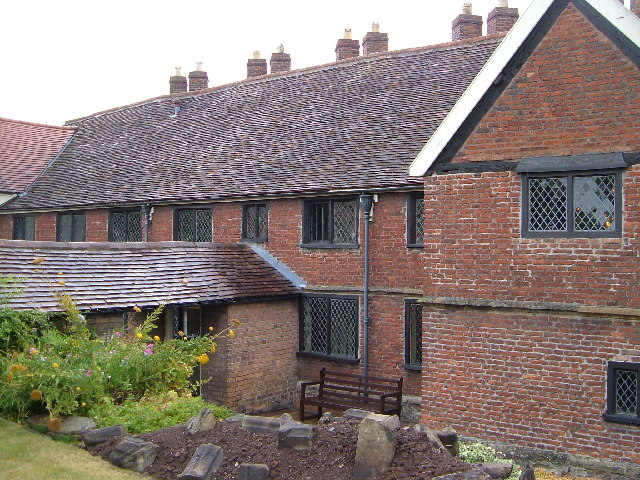
Gray's Almshouses

Gray's Almshouses in East Street, founded by Robert Gray in 1615 for poor single women, are red brick buildings bearing the arms of Robert Gray, dated 1635, and another arms of the Merchant Tailors. A small room used as a chapel has original benches and a painted ceiling. It has been classed by English Heritage as a Grade I listed building.

St Margaret's Almshouses was founded as a leper colony in the 12th century. Glastonbury Abbey acquired patronage of it in the late 13th century and rebuilt it as almshouses in the early 16th. From 1612 to 1938 the building continued as such, cared for by a local parish. In the late 1930s it was converted into a hall of offices for the Rural Community Council and accommodation for the Somerset Guild of Craftsmen. It later fell into disrepair. The Somerset Buildings Preservation Trust with Falcon Rural Housing purchased and restored it for use as four units of social housing. It is a Grade II* listed building.

The grounds of Taunton Castle include the Somerset County Museum and The Castle Hotel, which incorporates the Castle Bow archway. With the municipal buildings they form a three-sided group just beyond the Castle Bow archway from Fore Street. A plain brick Mecca Bingo hall fills the west side of it.

The frontage of the Fore Street Tudor Tavern, now a Caffè Nero branch, dates from 1578, but the rest is thought to be from the 14th century.

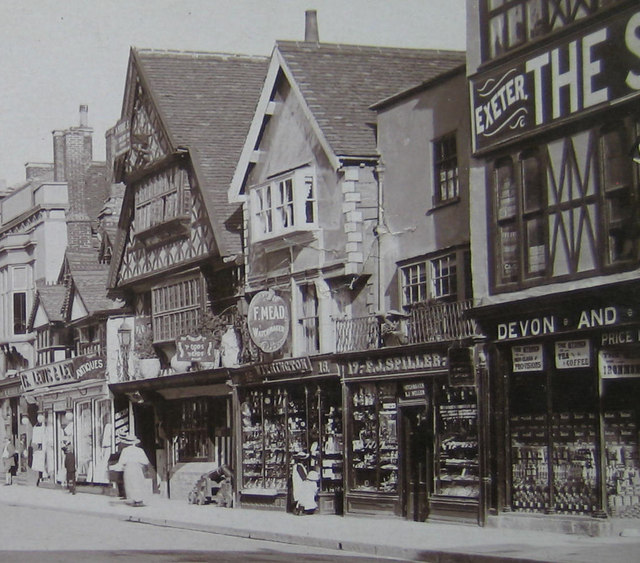
Tudor Buildings, Fore Street

The riverside area north of the centre is edged by Morrisons supermarket, retirement housing and the Brewhouse Theatre. Towards the centre are Bridge Street and Goodlands Gardens. A regeneration programme north of Bridge Street included redeveloping the County Cricket Ground was completed in 2016.

=== Public parks ===
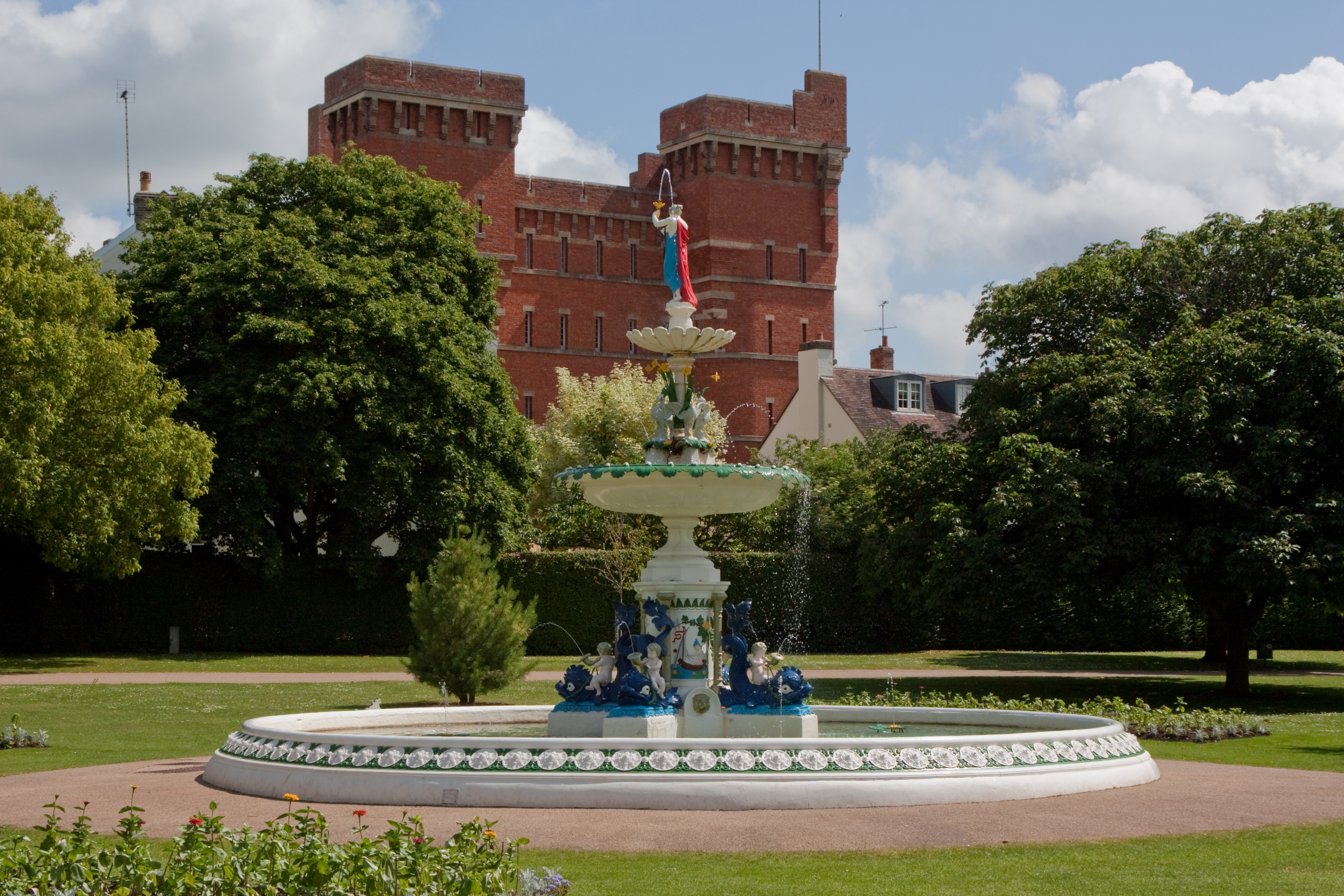
Victoria memorial water fountain, Vivary Park with Jellalabad Barracks in the background

The principal park in Taunton is Vivary Park. It covers 7.5 ha (19 acres) on land that was once a medieval fish farm or vivarium for Taunton Priory and Taunton Castle. A pair of decorative cast iron gates form the main entrance opposite the High Street. Near the gates is the war memorial by I.F. Shellard. and further into the park are a large decorative fountain which was installed in 1907 to commemorate Queen Victoria, and a bandstand. The Wilton Lands are another open space with a small lake adjacent to Vivary Park.

Goodlands Gardens is in the town centre between the river and the museum. Victoria Park covers 5.7 ha (14 acres) and includes sports pitches, outdoor gym and play area. It is located off East Reach.

=== Pride Rainbow Path ===
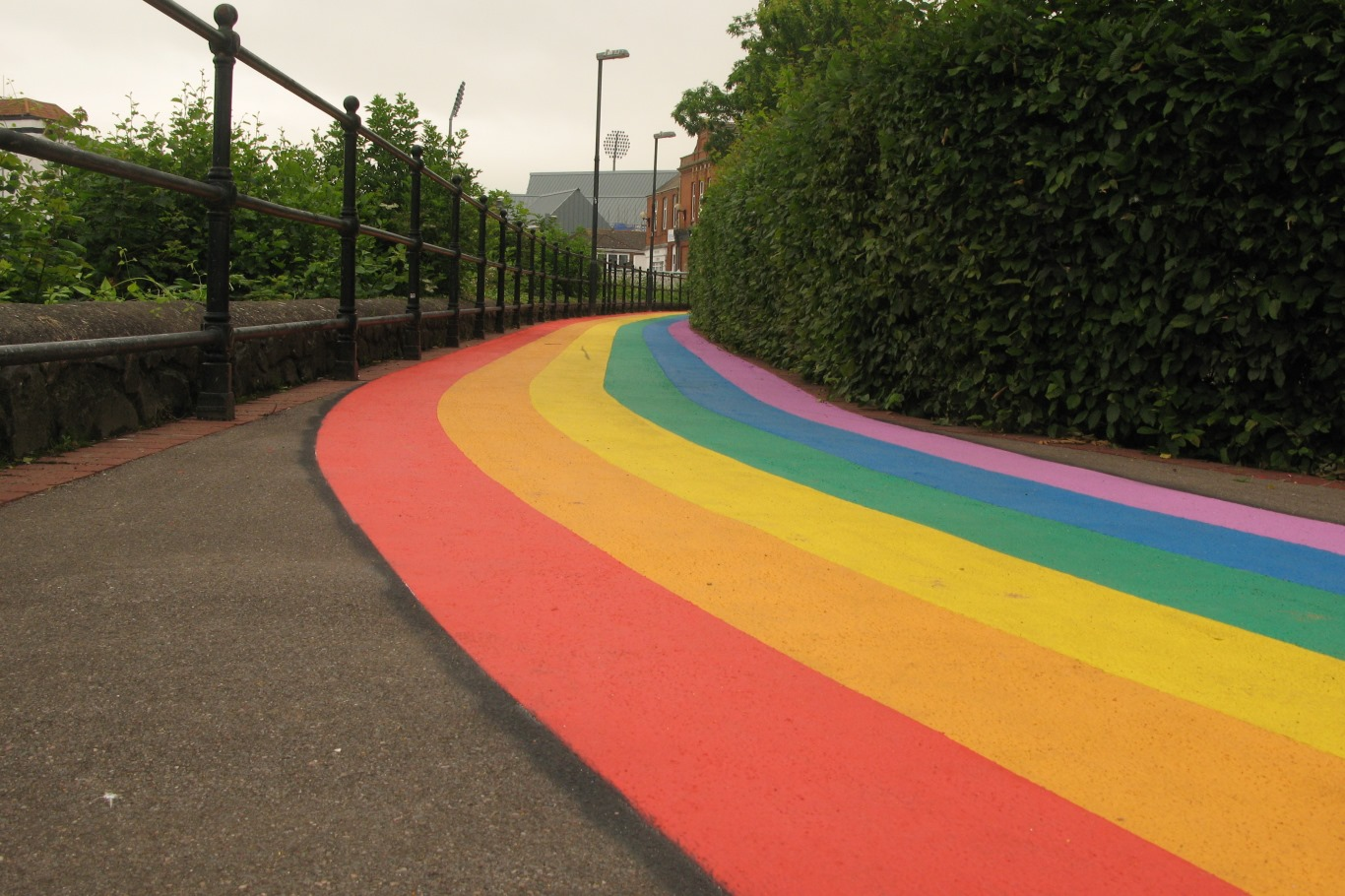
Pride Rainbow Path, Taunton.

The Pride Rainbow Path in Goodland Gardens, Taunton town centre, runs alongside the River Tone. Designed by Jenny Keogh and Liz Hutchin of GoCreate, it opened on 28 June 2021 to mark the anniversary of the Stonewall riots, which served as a catalyst for the gay rights movement. It is believed to be the first such path in the UK. The opening coincided with the first Taunton Pride in July 2021 and the Pride inspired Art Trail.

The far end of the 62-metre path includes the chevron of Daniel Quasar's "Progress" flag, which incorporates the transgender flag and ethnic minorities, while the majority of the path uses the traditional LGBT rainbow. The path has been designed not to require maintenance for 15 years.

== Transport ==
=== Railway ===
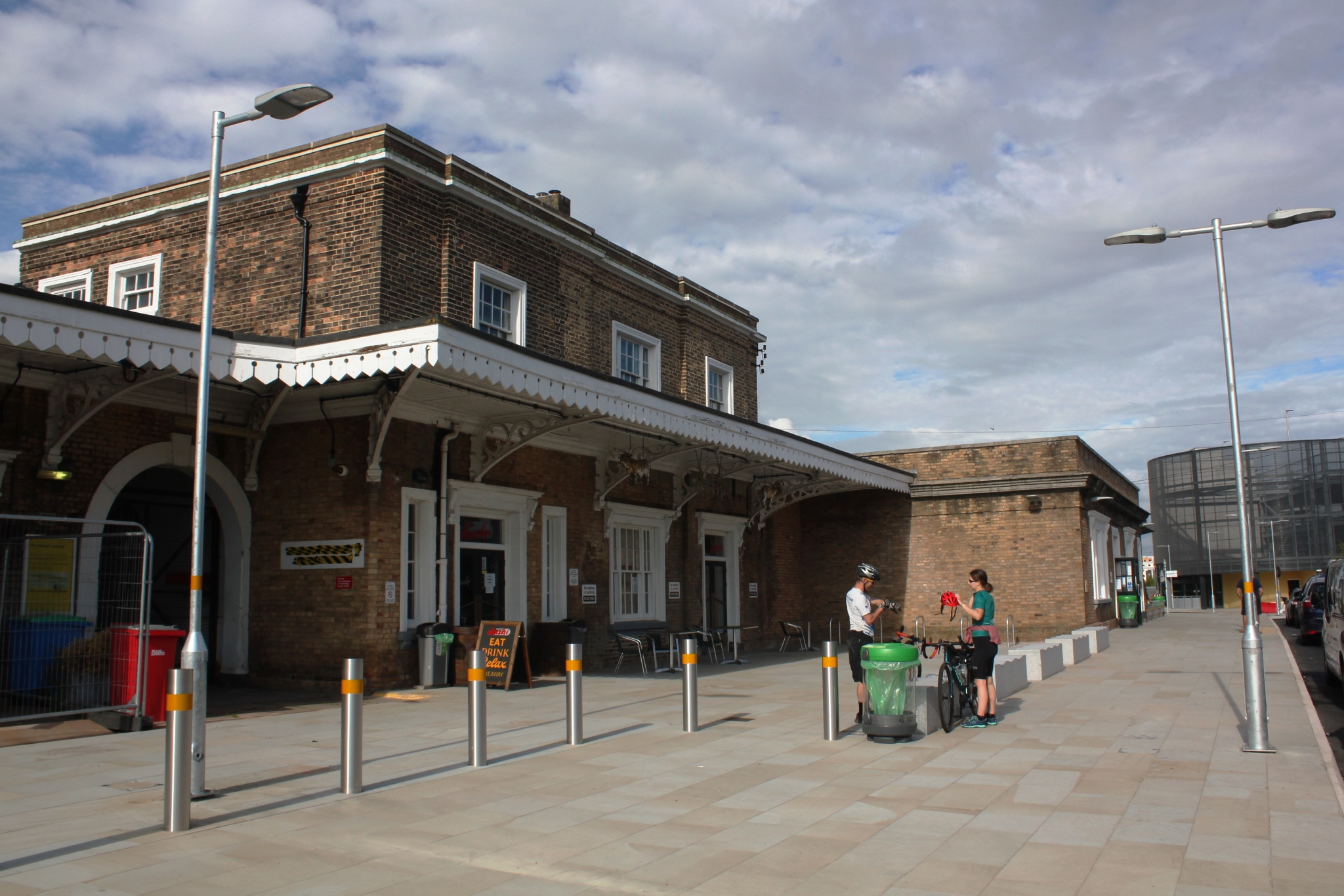
Taunton station entrance

Taunton railway station is a principal stop on the Bristol to Exeter line, the Reading to Taunton line and the Cross Country Route. It is served by two train operating companies:

- Great Western Railway operates services to London Paddington, Exeter St Davids, Plymouth, Penzance, Cardiff Central and Bristol Temple Meads. It also manages the station.
- CrossCountry provides services to Birmingham New Street, Leeds, Manchester Piccadilly, Glasgow Central, Edinburgh Waverley, Plymouth and Penzance.

The former railway to Minehead was closed in 1971 and is now a heritage railway; West Somerset Railway provides services between Bishops Lydeard and Minehead.

In 2009, Project Taunton, the authority responsible for Taunton's regeneration, revealed proposals for Taunton metro rail, under a transport sustainability plan. They were not implemented.

=== Road ===
Taunton has road links with the M5 motorway junctions 25 (Taunton) and 26 (Wellington) close to the town, and other major roads such as the A38 and A358. The Taunton bypass section of the M5, between the two junctions, opened in April 1974 and relieved the town of heavy holiday traffic on the A38. Taunton Deane services use that motorway section.

A strong economy increases traffic; in 2011, the County Council foresaw a sharp rise from 2001 levels. Two major roads opened: the Third Way (A3807) linking Bridge Street and Castle Street in 2011, and the Northern Inner Distributor Road (A3087) between Staplegrove Road and Priory Avenue in July 2017.

=== Buses and coaches ===
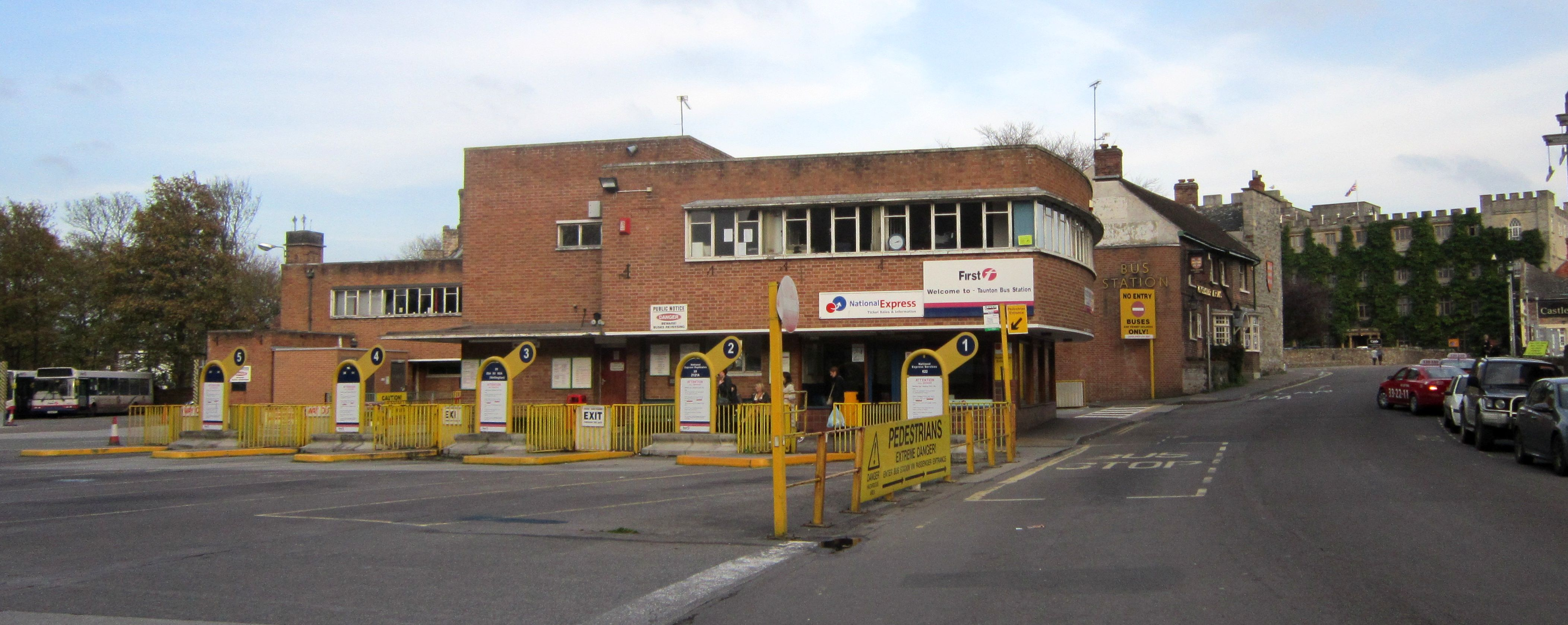
Taunton's former bus station

Bus services in the Taunton area are detailed below:

- Many local services are provided by The Buses of Somerset; their routes operate to Minehead, Bridgwater and Yeovil. Its route 28 links the railway stations at Taunton and Bishops Lydeard. Other services are provided by Hatch Green Coaches. Taunton bus station was in Tower Street from 1953 until 2020. Most services now terminate at stops on The Parade or Castle Way.
- Taunton's park and ride service operates between Taunton gateway near the M5 motorway and Silk Mills on the north-west side of town. It is operated by Stagecoach, who also operate the Falcon coach service between Plymouth, Taunton and Bristol.
- Berrys Coaches, based in Taunton, operates several 'Superfast' services to London, as well as operating services on behalf of Flixbus. National Express runs long-distance coach services to many destinations.

=== Air ===
The nearest airports are Exeter and Bristol, both within 40 miles (64 km) of Taunton.

=== Trams ===
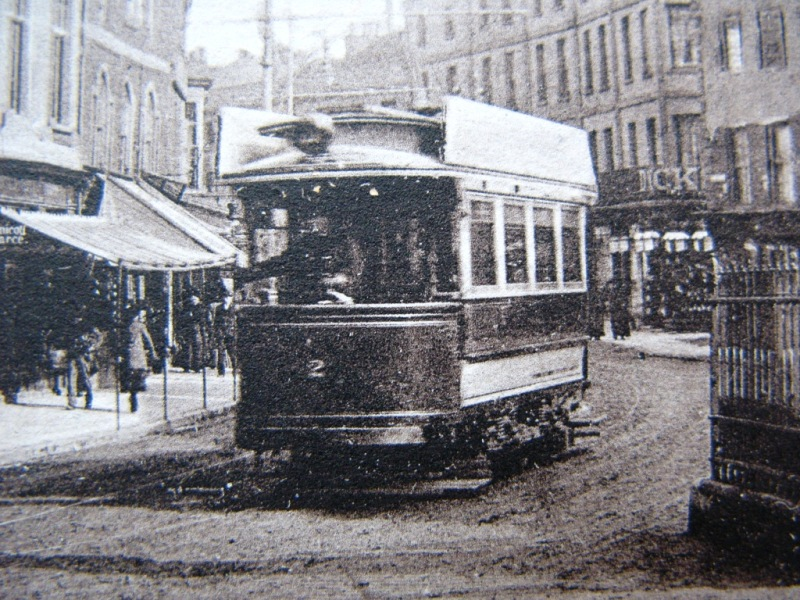
A single-deck car in Fore Street, c. 1910

Taunton Tramway opened on 21 August 1901. Six double-decker cars operated on a 3 ft 6 in (1,067 mm) gauge line between the railway station and the depot at East Reach. In 1905 the service was withdrawn for two months while the track was improved; the cars were replaced by six single-decker cars and the old double deckers sold to Leamington Spa. A short extension beyond the station to Rowbarton opened in 1909, making the line 1.66 miles (2.7 km) long. However, the price of its electricity was due to rise in 1928 to a level the firm refused to pay, and it offered to sell out, but this was not accepted. The electricity was cut off on 28 May 1921 and the system closed.

=== Canal ===
The Bridgwater and Taunton Canal is a navigable waterway that links Taunton with Bridgwater, opened in 1827. Having been closed to navigation in 1907, it re-opened after restoration in 1994.

== Education ==
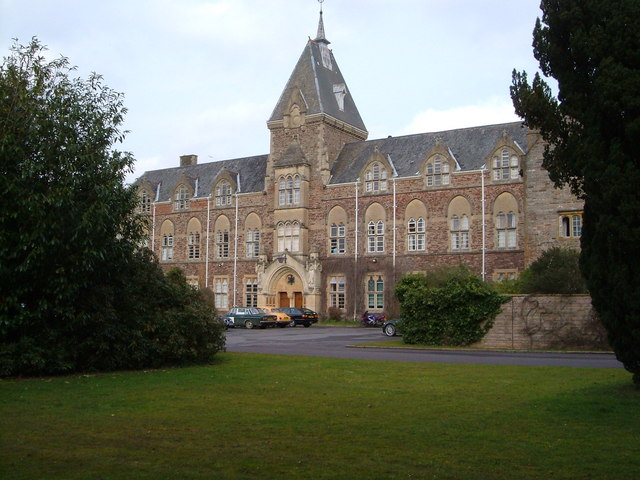
King's College

State secondary schools in Taunton include The Castle School, Monkton Wood Academy, Bishop Fox's School and The Taunton Academy. Further education is offered by Richard Huish College, The Taunton Academy (sponsored by Richard Huish College) and Bridgwater and Taunton College. Heathfield Community School has a post-16 further education college specialising in performing arts and technical theatre called The SPACE (The Somerset Performing Arts Centre for Education). Heathfield Community School is also a teaching school and the base of Taunton Teaching Alliance. The Taunton campus of Bridgwater and Taunton College is a partner of Plymouth University and includes University Centre Taunton. There are three co-educational private schools: Queen's College, King's College and Taunton School.

In March 2009, it was found that Jim Knight, Minister of State for Schools and Families, had approved the closure of Ladymead Community School and the nearby St Augustine of Canterbury RC/CoE School in the Priorswood area of Taunton. They gave way in September 2010 to the Taunton Academy.

Young people with special educational needs are provided for by two special schools and one complex Pupil Referral Unit (PRU). Sky College caters for boys aged 10–18 who have social, emotional and mental-health difficulties. Selworthy School has pupils of 4–19 who have complex and multiple learning difficulties, while the Taunton Deane Partnership College is a complex PRU for children in Key Stages 2, 3 and 4, with a Medical Tuition Service, Outreach & Advisory Service and an Area Access Team.

== Health services ==
Taunton is within NHS Somerset and home to Musgrove Park Hospital. This is one of two district hospitals in Somerset NHS Foundation Trust, alongside Yeovil Hospital. A Nuffield Hospital also lies in the town, run privately by Nuffield Health. The town has several medical surgeries and a family planning clinic, an occupational health centre and a chiropractic clinic.

== Religious sites ==
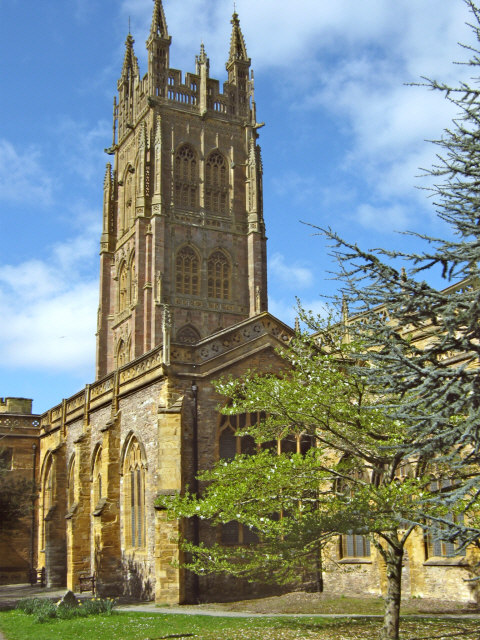
Taunton Minster Church of St. Mary Magdalene

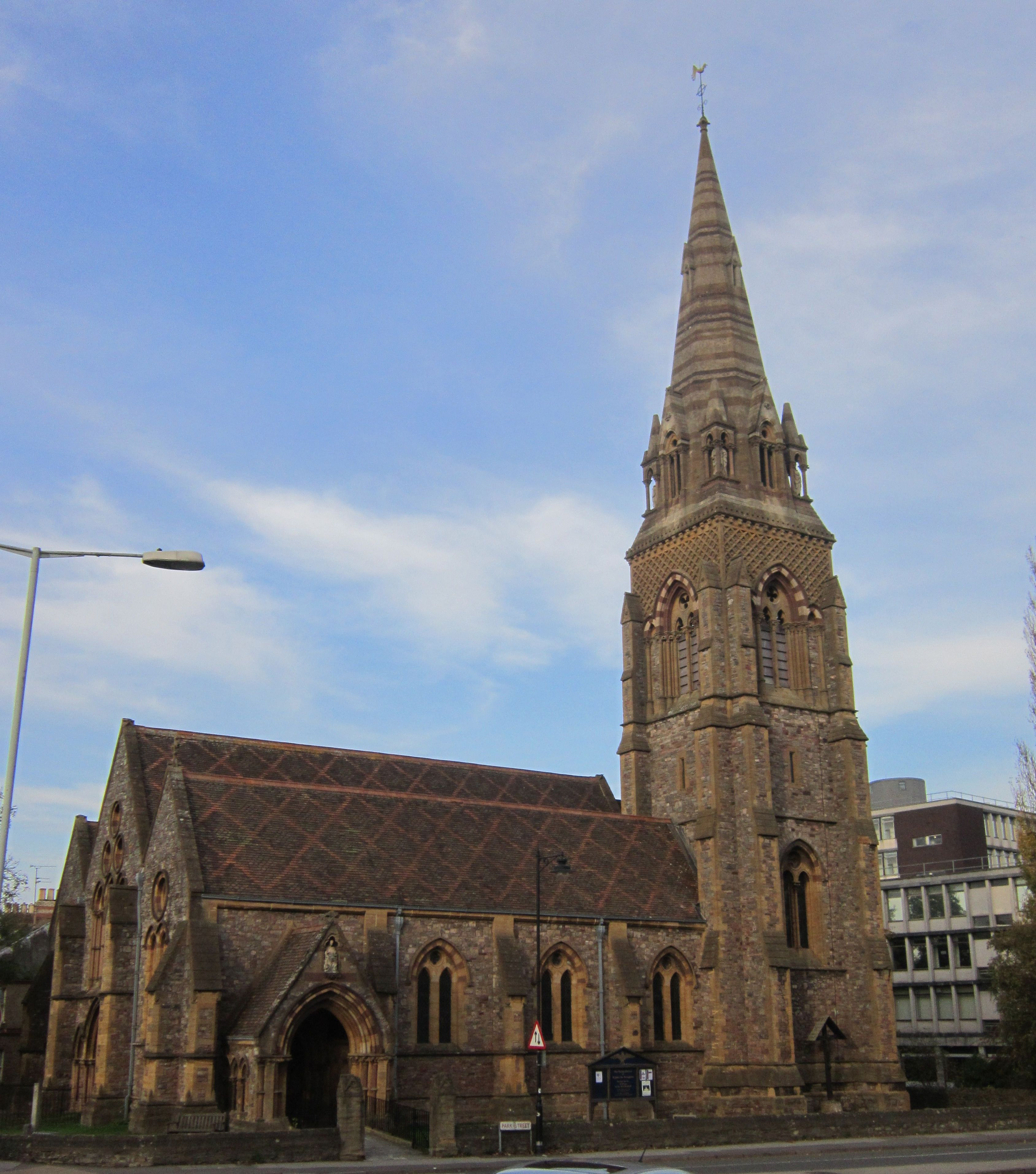
Church of St John the Evangelist

The Taunton Minster Church of St Mary Magdalene, built of sandstone more in the South Somerset style, retains an attractive painted interior, but its prime feature is a 15th and 16th-century tower rebuilt in the mid-19th century. It is one of the country's best examples and a landmark 158 feet (48 m) high. It was termed by Simon Jenkins, "the finest in England. It makes its peace with the sky not just with a coronet but with the entire crown jewels cast in red-brown stone." It holds 12 bells and 3 bells "hung dead" for the clock.

Close by St Mary Magdelene and near the County Ground is the parish church of St James. The oldest parts are early 14th century; there are fragments of 15th-century glass in the west end. Like St Mary's, it has a sandstone tower, but built to a less impressive design. It too was rebuilt in the 19th century, in this case due to building defects in the original.

The church of St John the Evangelist was built in 1858 to serve the poor of the town. The church of St Andrew, built 1878, serves the area of Rowbarton.

In the later 17th century, Taunton had two Dissenting places of worship: "Paul's Meeting" and the Baptist Meeting. The former was built at the top of Paul Street soon after 1672 on a bowling green behind the Three Cups Inn, now The County Hotel, and rapidly became one of the largest congregations in the county. After Mayor Timewell sacked both Paul's Meeting and the Baptist Meeting in 1683, the dissenters were driven to worship in private houses on the outskirts of Taunton, where their assemblies were regularly raided by the Justices of the Peace. Paul's Meeting survived attempts to turn it into a workhouse, and with the coming of William III and Mary II, followed by the Toleration Act 1688, it reopened. Hugh Willoughby, 15th Baron Willoughby of Parham, was educated in early life at Taunton Dissenters' Academy. The Baptist Meeting became the Baptist New Meeting, registered in 1691 and rebuilt in 1721 as Mary Street Chapel.

Taunton Unitarian Chapel, dating from 1721, stands in Mary Street. Samuel Taylor Coleridge, while living at Nether Stowey 16 miles (26 km) away, came to the chapel to preach several times. Dr Malachi Blake, who founded the Taunton and Somerset Hospital in East Reach, Taunton, was also a preacher there, attending in 1809 a celebration of the 50th year of George the Third's reign. The chapel retains its original interior, including Flemish oak pillars in Corinthian style. The pews and pulpit are also in oak. There is an early 18th-century candelabra.

St George's, the town's Roman Catholic church, dates from the mid-19th century. It was the second Catholic church built in Taunton since the Reformation, replacing a smaller St George's Chapel. The main building is designated by English Heritage as a Grade II* listed building, while the clergy house is Grade II listed.

== Culture ==
Taunton town centre has the Brewhouse Theatre. It closed in February 2013 due to financial difficulties, but reopened in April 2014 under the Taunton Theatre Association (TTA), which was granted the 61-year lease that Taunton Deane Borough Council had bought on the site and its contents from the administrator. Tacchi-Morris Arts Centre is a professional theatre based at Monkton Wood Academy, hosting touring theatre, dance and comedy, and productions by South West schools and colleges. Tacchi-Morris Arts Centre also runs community classes. The Creative Innovation Centre CIC has an arts and culture venue in the town centre.

Taunton Flower Show is held each August in Vivary Park. It is the oldest flower show in England, the first show having been at the Assembly Rooms in 1831 and in the park since 1851.

The County Cricket Ground has hosted some open-air concerts including Elton John in 2006 and Rod Stewart in 2014. Several concerts are held each year at Taunton's largest church, St Mary Magdalene. In recent years The Sixteen, The Tallis Scholars and Gabrieli Consort have all performed to full audiences. Taunton also has several choirs and orchestras that perform in the town's churches and school chapels. Many music and drama groups are members of the Taunton Association of Performing Arts (TAPA), which produces a diary and calendar of performances in and about the town.

Taunton has two radio stations: BBC Radio Somerset, and Apple FM.

Since 2001, Taunton has been the base of a domestic violence charity, the ManKind Initiative, to help male victims of domestic abuse.

== Sport ==
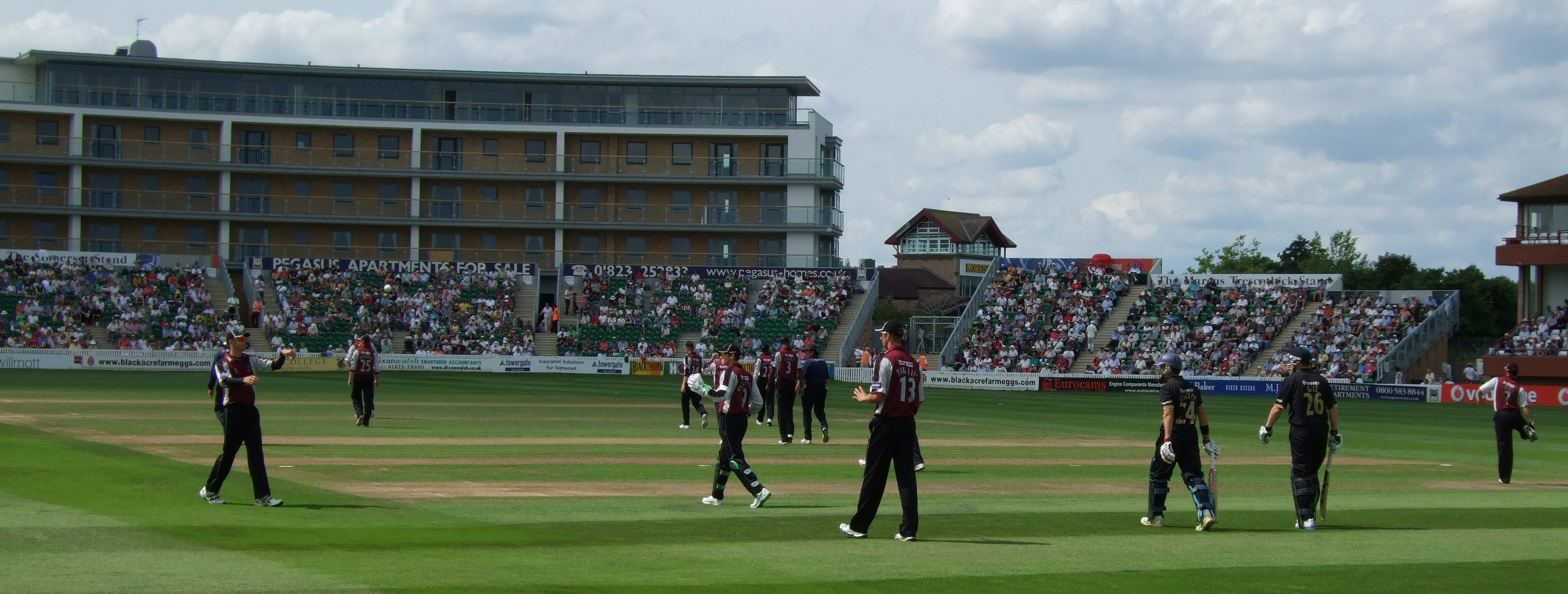
Somerset playing Yorkshire at the County Ground

The County Ground was originally home to Taunton Cricket Club, formed in 1829. It played at the County Ground until 1977, before moving to Moorfields, Taunton, in conjunction with Taunton Vale Hockey Club, since when the County Ground has been solely used by Somerset County Cricket Club (CCC). Somerset CCC was formed in 1875, but did not achieve first-class status until 1891. The County Ground has a capacity of 8,500; the ends are called the River End and the Marcus Trescothick Pavilion End. It is the current home of the England women's cricket team. The Somerset Cricket Museum is nearby, housed in the old priory barn.

Taunton Cricket Club moved to the Taunton Vale Sports Club Ground in Staplegrove. Taunton Vale Cricket Club was established in 1938 and have played at Convent Field adjacent to Vivary Park since 1960. Taunton St Andrews Cricket Club play at the nearby Wyvern Sports and Social Club in Mountfields Road.

Taunton Town Football Club (FC) plays at Wordsworth Drive. An earlier Taunton Town FC played at Priory Park in the 1930s, however the current team was formed in 1947 by local businessmen as Taunton FC, changing to the current name in 1968, and played its first friendly fixture in 1948. For most of its history, Taunton belonged to the Western League. It spent a six-season spell in the Southern League from 1977, and after a further period in the Western League, returned to the Southern League in 2002, after winning the FA Vase in 2001. The club won the Division One South and West league title in 2017–18 and narrowly missed out on further promotion in 2018–19.

Taunton Rugby Football Club (RFC), based in Taunton, currently play in National League 1, having achieved back-to-back promotions in 2009 and 2010 and then again in 2020. It played at Priory Park Sports Ground from 1935 to 2001, before moving to the Commsplus Stadium.

Somerset Vikings is a rugby league club formed in 2003 as part of the Rugby Football League's plans to develop the game beyond its traditional north-of-England areas. Initially the side was made up of a mixture of Royal Marines based in Taunton and Exeter with local rugby union players keen to try the 13-man code. It plays at Hyde Park, also home to Taunton RFC.

The Huish Tigers (formerly Taunton Tigers) is a semi-professional men's basketball team competing in the Somerset Basketball League. The team plays its home games at Richard Huish College. They also have a basketball academy with youth teams as well as a women's team.

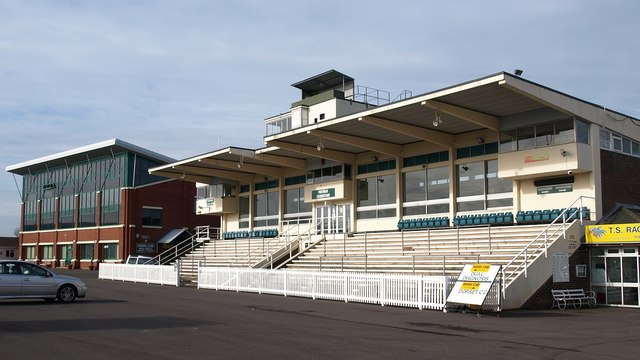
The Grandstand at the racecourse

Taunton Racecourse is close to the Blackdown Hills, about 2 miles (3 km) from the centre of Taunton. Although racing had been held in the area before, the first race at this site was held on 21 September 1927. The Orchard Stand and Paddock Stand provide catering facilities and are used for meetings and conferences on days when racing is not taking place. Greyhound racing was held at the Priory Park Sports Ground and County Cricket ground in the past.

== Residents ==
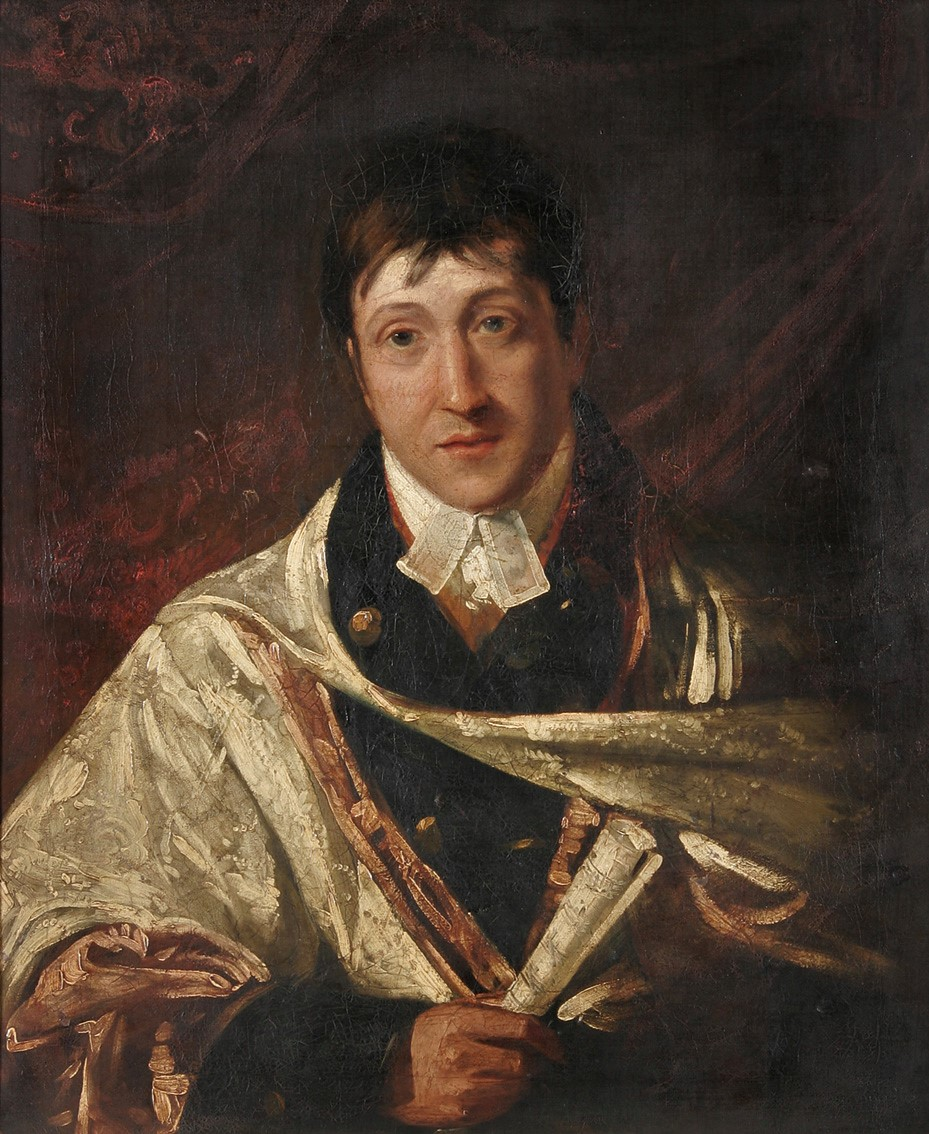
Portrait of William Crotch

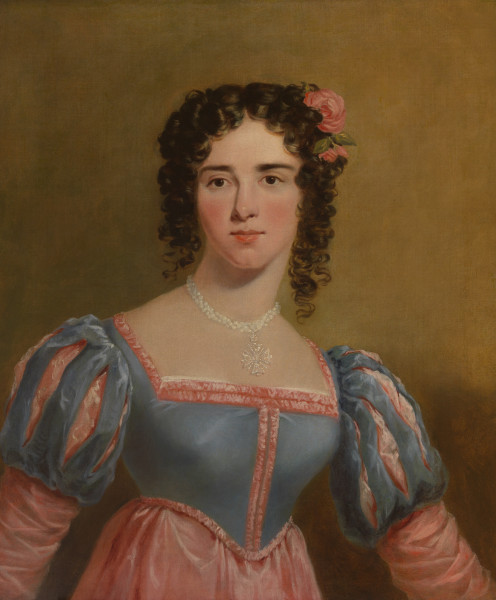
Margaretta Graddon, 1824

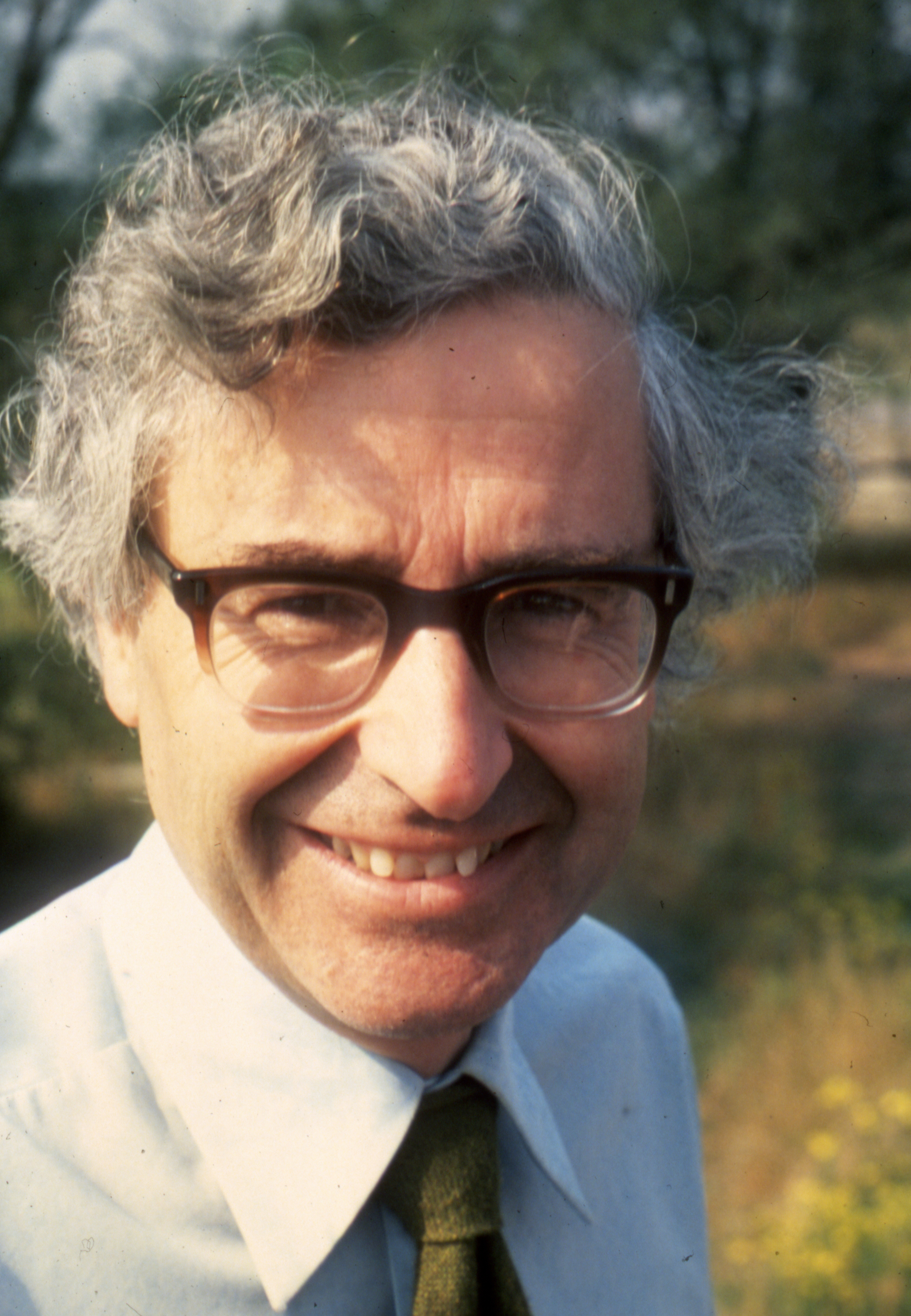
Antony Hewish, 1976

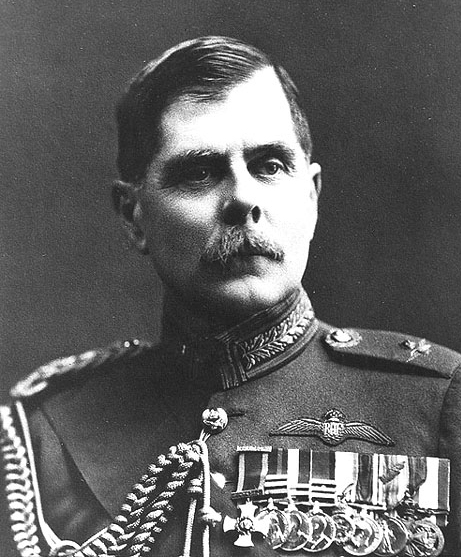
Hugh Trenchard, 1st Viscount Trenchard, 1930's

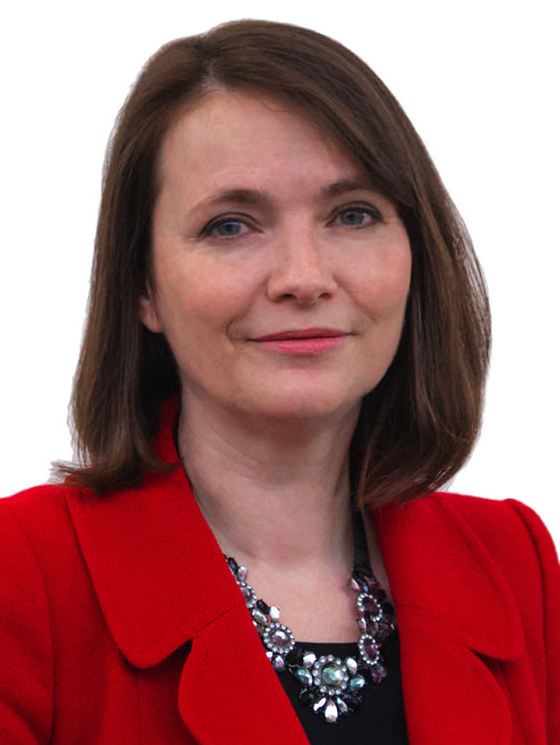
Kirsty Williams, 2016

The following were born or have lived in Taunton:

- Lady Harriet Acland (1750–1815), noblewoman and diarist.
- Jenny Agutter (born 1952), actress born in Taunton
- Joseph Alleine (1634–1668), Nonconformist pastor and author
- Thomas Amory (1701–1774), a dissenting tutor and minister and poet.
- William Larkins Bernard (1843–1922), architect born in Taunton
- John Boswell (1698–1757), writer and clergyman, local vicar.
- Pattie Boyd (born 1944), actress and model; former wife of George Harrison, then Eric Clapton
- Charles Chorley (c. 1810–1874), journalist, man of letters and translator.
- Edward William Cox (1809–1879), lawyer, legal writer and successful publisher.
- John Crockford (c. 1823–1865), publisher
- William Crotch (1775–1847), composer and Principal of the Royal Academy of Music, is buried at Bishops Hull Church, Taunton.
- Stephen Daldry (born 1960), three times Academy Award nominee and Tony Award-winning stage and film director and producer
- Samuel Daniel (1562–1619) a poet, playwright and historian, born "near Taunton".
- Alexander Ewing (1830-1895), Scottish composer, finished his army career, retired and died locally.
- Samuel Farr (1741–1795), M.D., an English physician.
- Roger Goodland (1880–1944), a bibliographer and author.
- Charles George Gordon (1833–1885), UK army general known as Gordon of Khartoum, attended the former Fullands School.
- Margaretta Graddon (1804-1854?), a British popular singer.
- Henry Grove (1684–1738), a nonconformist minister, theologian, and dissenting tutor.
- Sir Benjamin Hammet (c. 1736–1800), businessman, banker and Taunton native, served as its MP in 1782–1800, and as High Sheriff of London. Elected Lord Mayor of London in 1797 but did not serve
- Antony Hewish (1924–2021), astronomer and Nobel Prize for Physics winner in 1974
- Rebecca Huxtable (born 1981), Taunton-born radio personality and producer, co-produced The Scott Mills Show on BBC Radio 1
- Howard Jones (born 1955), musician.
- Alexander William Kinglake (1809–1891), barrister, travel writer and historian, was born at Wilton House near Taunton.
- John Gorham Maitland (1818–1863), academic, civil servant and a Cambridge Apostle.
- Deborah Meaden (born 1959), Taunton-born business mogul, philanthropist and star of the TV series Dragons Den
- William Ellis Metford (1824–1899), Taunton-born engineer known for the Metford rifling in the Lee–Metford service rifle.
- John Mole (born 1941), poet and jazz musician born in Taunton
- Frank Montague Moore (1877–1967), Taunton-born painter and first director of the Honolulu Museum of Art
- Alfred B. Mullett (1834–1890), architect to Abraham Lincoln, born in Taunton
- James Northcote (born 1987), actor and film producer, was a pupil of King's College, Taunton.
- Edwin Norris (1795–1872), philologist, linguist and intrepid orientalist.
- Edmund Prideaux (1634–1702), MP for Taunton, took part in the Monmouth rebellion.
- Gary Rhodes (1960–2019), celebrated head chef at the Castle Hotel, Taunton, 1986–1990
- Ivor Salter (1925–1991), actor, born in Taunton
- Miranda Shearer (born 1982), author born in Taunton, since resident in Spaxton, Over Stowey.
- John Hurford Stone (1763–1818), radical political reformer and publisher.
- Hugh Trenchard, 1st Viscount Trenchard (1873–1956), Taunton-born military officer involved in founding the Royal Air Force
- Sir Charles Trevelyan, 1st Baronet (1807–1886), Governor of Madras, born in Taunton
- James Turle (1802–1882) an organist and composer.
- John Upton (1707–1760), clergyman, academic and critic; editor of poet Edmund Spenser.
- Phil Vickery (born 1961), celebrity chef
- Francis Webb (1735–1815), an English writer.
- David Webster (1931-2003), British television producer and executive
- Frederick Wensley (1865–1949), chief constable of Scotland Yard CID, born in Taunton
- John Wiche (1718–1794), an English Baptist minister.
- Kirsty Williams (born 1971), a Welsh politician and Welsh Government minister from 2016 to 2021.
- David Henry Wilson (born 1937), writer known for children's stories such as the Jeremy James series
- Sir Jeremy Wright (born 1972), born in Taunton, attended Taunton School, became MP and Attorney General for England and Wales

=== Sport ===
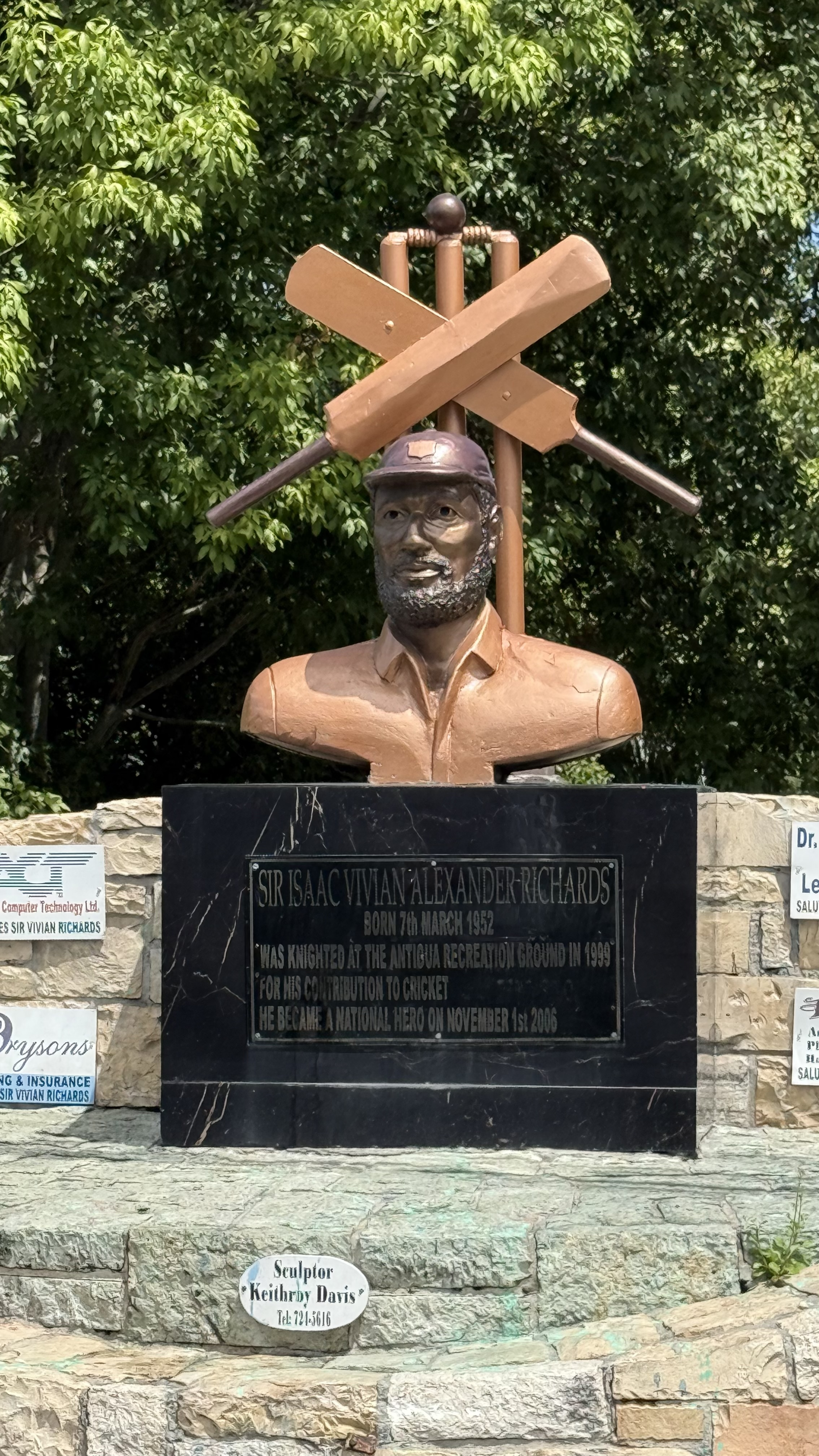
a bust of Sir Vivian Richards from St. John's, Antigua and Barbuda

- Colin Addison (born 1940), professional footballer and manager born in Taunton
- Jos Buttler (born 1990), England cricketer
- Deborah Criddle (born 1966), a Taunton-born para-equestrian winner of three golds at the Athens 2004 Summer Paralympics and three medals at the London 2012 Summer Paralympics in London. She currently lives in nearby Trull.
- Scott Laird (born 1988), footballer with Scunthorpe United
- Jack Leach (born 1991), cricketer with Somerset County Cricket Club and England cricket team
- Edward Ling (born 1983), sport shooter and bronze medallist in the men's trap at the 2016 Summer Olympics.)
- Lee Martin (born 1987), Taunton-born footballer with Millwall F.C.
- Ciara Michel (born 1985), member of GB Olympic volleyball squad, the first to play in the Olympics
- Justin Pipe (born 1971), professional darts player with the PDA
- Viv Richards (born 1952), Antiguan-born West Indies cricketer resident in Taunton while playing for Somerset, 1974–1986
- Andy Robinson (born 1964), Taunton-born England rugby union international and head coach, now head coach of Scotland
- Marcus Trescothick (born 1975), cricketer, recipient of the Taunton Deane Citizenship Award in 2005
- Becky Wilde (born 1997), rower, bronze medallist in double sculls at the 2024 Summer Olympics.

== Twinning ==
Taunton is twinned with:

- Lisieux, France – since 1951
- Königslutter, Germany – since 1992
