= Phil Vickery =

Phil Vickery may refer to:

- Phil Vickery (rugby union) (born 1976), English rugby union footballer
- Phil Vickery (chef) (born 1961), celebrity chef
