= Taunton Flower Show =

Coordinates: 51.006°N 3.098°W

- Genre: Flower show
- Dates: Early August
- Locations: Taunton, Somerset, England
- Years active: 187
- Founded: 1831
- Patron: Bob Homeshaw
- Website: http://www.tauntonfs.co.uk

Taunton Flower Show is an annual flower show held in Vivary Park, Taunton, Somerset, England. It has been described as "The Chelsea of the West", and attracts around 17,000 visitors over its two days.

== Description ==
The show was first held in 1831 and apart from during the Second World War, has been held every year since. The history of the show is documented in a book by Anne Leamon, a current Vice Chairman, and cited as the 'Longest running Show in country' There has been controversy in 2017 when Taunton Deane Borough Council decided to impose a rental on the Taunton Flower Show for the use of Vivary Park which put a question mark over its future on the site but at present the Flower Show is remaining at Vivary Park whilst continuing to review its budgets. The Chairman then Adrian Prior-Sankey was awarded the MBE in 2018 "for service to the community of Taunton"

The show missed a year in 2020 due to the Covid pandemic and the 2021 show was a much smaller one held on Castle Green in Taunton. From 2022 the show returned to its traditional venue in Vivary Park.

In 2023 the show upgraded its organisational software to showingscene
