= Taunton Priory =

Former monastery in Somerset, England

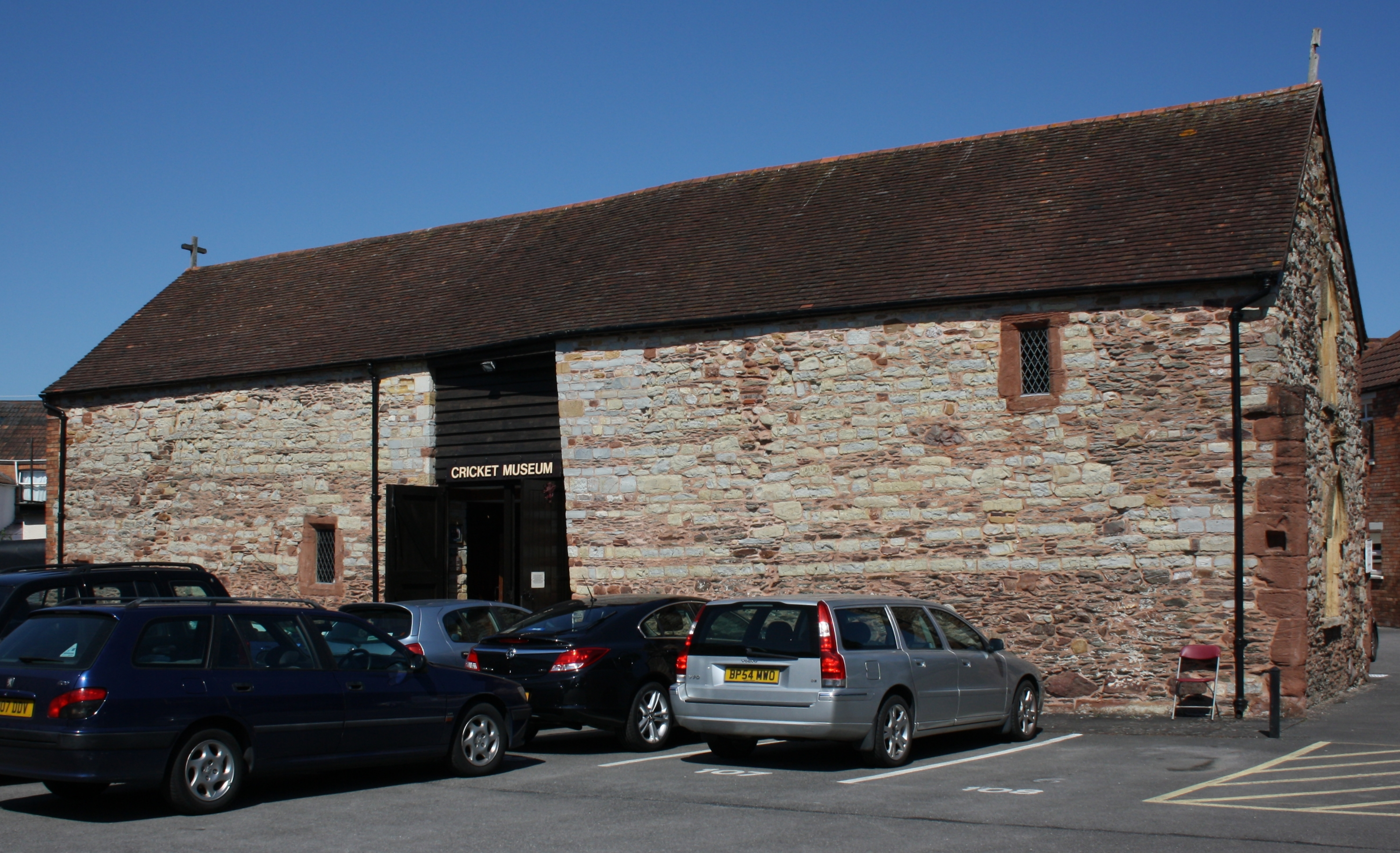
- The Old Priory Barn, now used as a museum, is the only surviving building.
- Interactive map of Taunton Priory

Monastery information
- Other names: Priory of St Peter and St Paul
- Order: Augustinian canons
- Established: c1115
- Disestablished: 1539

Site
- Location: Taunton, Somerset, England
- Coordinates: 51°01′05″N 3°05′54″W
- Grid reference: grid reference ST23062487

Taunton Priory, or the Priory of St Peter and St Paul, was an Augustinian house of canons founded c. 1115 by William Gyffarde (also called William Giffard), Bishop of Winchester and Chancellor of England near Taunton, Somerset, England.

== History ==
Taunton was one of several existing houses of secular clergy which was transformed into an Augustinian priory during the reign of Henry I. King Edward granted Taunton an exemption from royal dues in 904, and his successors, Athelstan in 938 and Edgar in 978, confirmed Taunton's rights and privileges. In the 1110s, William Giffard, bishop of Winchester, took five canons from Merton Priory to reform the house at Taunton, apparently no easy matter. One canon returned to Merton; it is presumed that the four others stayed in Taunton. The canons of Taunton were joined by two others, c.1180, from the newly dissolved Buckland Priory. Much later, in 1315, Taunton housed the Knights Templar Richard Engayne, under house arrest following the spectacular fall of the Templars. At its peak, in the 1330s, the priory was 26-strong, but after the Black Death, numbers were lower, at 15 in 1476 and 12 in 1539.

Taunton had charge of many churches in the area, including Taunton St. James and St. Mary Magdalene, St. Peter de Castello, Ash Priors and Withiel, Pitminster, Willand, Dulverton, Kingston Church, Lydeard St. Lawrence, Angersleigh, Bishop's Hull, Nynehead, Combe Florey, West Monkton, Thurlbear, Runnington, Thurloxton and Clannaborough.

The priory church was rebuilt in the late thirteenth century, but not completed by 1327, when Bishop Stratford of Winchester issued a licence to gather alms towards the completion of the church. Work was still dragging on eight years later, when Ralph of Shrewsbury, Bishop of Bath and Wells, licensed more alms-gathering, and in 1337, granted an indulgence to all those who contributed to the church building programme. The priory church was separate from the parish church.

The priory seems to have experienced some turbulence in the mid-fourteenth century – bloodshed in the priory church in 1332; the rape of a woman by one of the canons in 1345; the dissention and immorality of another canon in 1353 (who was sent to St Germans Priory). In 1351, the bishop also had to deal with another canon, the rector of West Monkton, who was driving his parishioners away from their church. The age and infirmity of the prior caused problems in the 1370s, with discipline loosening as a result: the bishop engineered his resignation and the election of a younger, fitter man. In 1403, William of Wykeham left Taunton 100 marks to pray for his soul, and in 1415 the prior received a papal indult for a portable altar. In 1499 the prior of Taunton was granted papal permission to use various episcopal ornaments and to admit canons and choristers to minor orders. In 1533, the small priory of Stavordale was merged with Taunton, perhaps anticipating the more general dissolution of smaller monasteries in 1536. On 12 February 1539, Taunton Priory itself was dissolved, surrendered by the prior William Wyllyams, the sub-prior William Gregory and ten canons, who all received pensions. The Valor Ecclesiasticus of 1535 valued the lands, tenements, and rents of the priory as £286 8s. 10d.

== Location ==
Its location was due in part to the fact that Taunton was a manor of the Bishops of Winchester. Henry de Blois, successor to William Gyffarde and brother of King Stephen is also shown as a co-founder of the priory, although it is not clear if he had any role in its construction. The Priory was dissolved in 1539, and entirely demolished except for the Priory Barn.

The medieval fish farm, or vivarium, is now the site of Vivary Park.

The current Priory Barn building, used by Somerset County Cricket Club as the Somerset Cricket Museum, dates from the late 15th or early 16th century, and replaces an earlier 13th or 14th century building on that site.

The location of the Priory Church and complex was uncovered by excavation in advance of the construction of a block of flats in 2005 by Context One Archaeological Services. The western end of the church and adjoining cloister was uncovered.
