= Vivary Park =

Public park in Taunton, Somerset, England

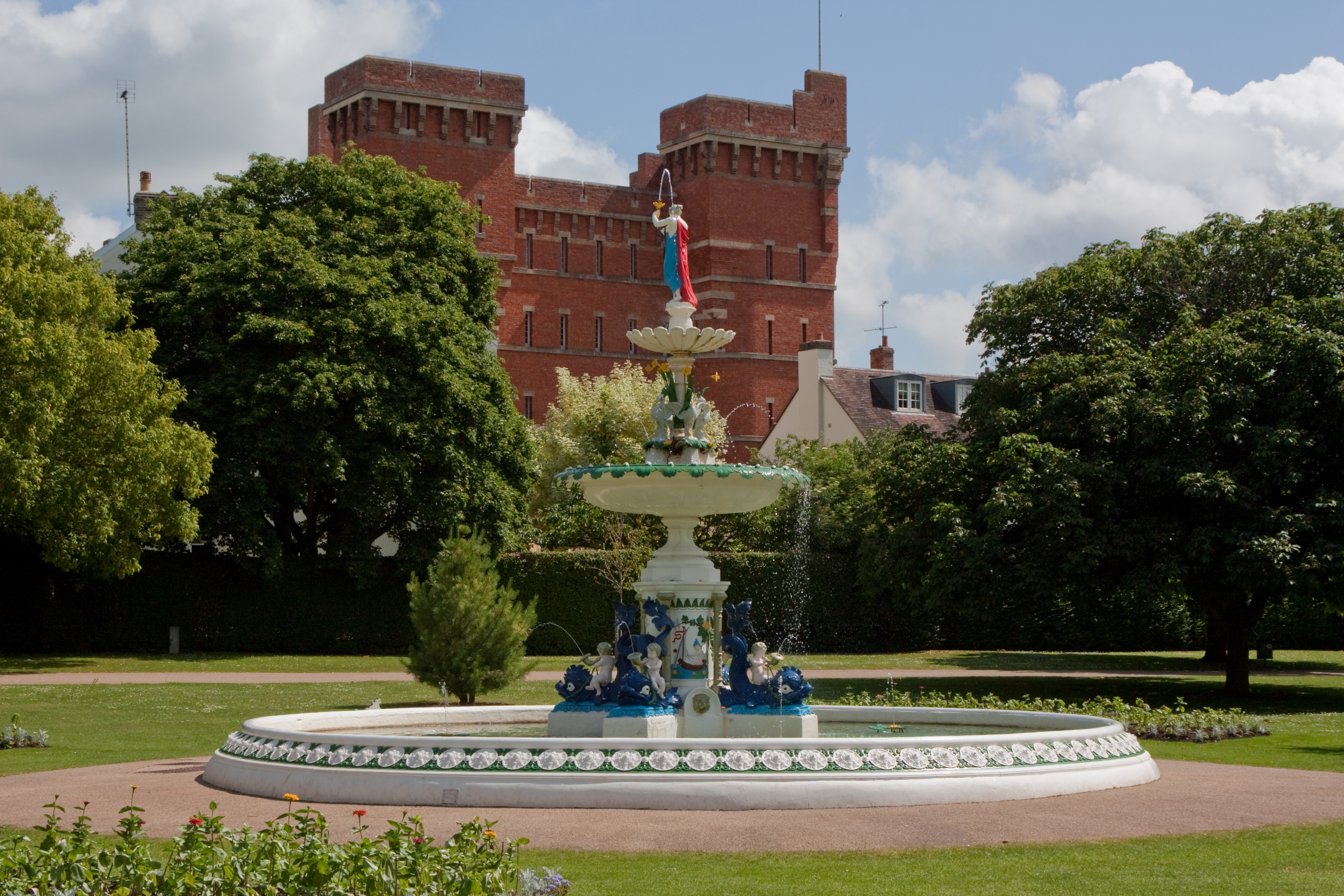
- Queen Victoria Memorial Fountain with Jellalabad Barracks in the background
- Interactive map of Vivary Park
- Location: Taunton, Somerset, England
- Coordinates: 51.008°N 3.102°W
- Area: 7.5 hectares (75,000 m^{2})
- Created: 1895
- Operator: Somerset Council
- Status: open all year
- Website: Vivary Park

Vivary Park is a public open space in Taunton, Somerset, England.

The Sherford Stream, a tributary of the River Tone, flows through the 7.5 hectares (19 acres) park, which is located near the centre of the town. It contains two main wide open spaces, as well as a war memorial dating from 1922, a miniature golf course, tennis courts, two children's playgrounds, a model railway track which was added in 1979, and an 18-hole, 4,620-yard (4,220 m), par-63 golf course. The park includes trees, rose beds and herbaceous borders, with around 56,000 spring and summer bedding plants being used each year. The rose garden includes the Royal National Rose Society Provincial Trial Ground.

The park is a garden of the European Garden Heritage Network.

== History ==
The park stands on land that was formerly a medieval fish farm, or vivarium, for Taunton Priory and Taunton Castle. Although nothing remains above ground of these lakes, they are the origin of the name Vivary. Entries in pipe rolls of the 13th and 14th centuries show that bream, pike, and eels were supplied from the vivarium to the Castle and sometimes to the royal household. These sources identify two ponds, the magnum vivarium, or great pond, which probably occupied the low-lying area of the present-day golf-course, and the parvum vivarium or little pond, within what is now the park proper. When a trench for a new sewer was cut through the park and its golf course during the 1970s, archaeologists were able to identify the deposits of silt left behind by the medieval fish ponds.

In 1810 a Mr William Kinglake of Taunton, a lawyer who was also a partner in a local bank, bought the park from the estate of John Hamnett, together with a twenty-roomed house called Wilton House, built in 1705, which is still standing. The gates of the house were at the end of the town's High Street, while its parkland stretched away from the town towards the Blackdown Hills, with chestnut trees and a stream. Kinglake was the father of the writer Alexander William Kinglake, who grew up at Vivary. The Kinglake family called the property 'The Vivary'.

Long before the park was publicly owned, it was known as Vivary Park and was used for some public events. It was lent by William Kinglake to provide the site of the West of England Show of 1852. He was also sympathetic to the Bristol and Somerset Total Abstinence Association and allowed the park to be used for its Public Tea Meeting and Demonstration on 17 August 1852. The first exhibition of the Vale of Taunton Deane Horticultural and Floricultural Society was held in the park on 21 and 22 June, 1855, and in 1883 a ten-day 'Temperance mission' was held in the park, at which "as many as 1,500 new pledges" of abstinence from alcohol were made.

In the mid 19th century, the park contained a Crimean War cannon known as the 'Sebastopol Gun', which was fired on great occasions.

In 1875, a local author wrote with real foresight –

At the top of High Street is Vivary Park, a well wooded enclosure, which would make a capital recreation ground for the town if the authorities could see their way to spend a few thousands in its purchase and ornamentation.

Two decades later, Vivary Park was still owned by the Kinglake family, but in 1894 they sold it to the Municipal Borough of Taunton for £3,659 (equal to around £230,000 in 2010), to encourage healthier lifestyles and to provide recreational opportunity for the urban working class, as set out in the Public Health Act 1875.

The arrangement of the park is still very much as was when first laid out in 1895. It is entered through a pair of cast iron gates, dating from 1895, made by the Saracen Foundry of Glasgow, who also made the Queen Victoria Memorial Fountain of 1907. Since 2000 the fountain has been restored, with funding from the Heritage Lottery Fund, and the park was re-opened by Queen Elizabeth II in May 2002. The bandstand also dates from 1895, while two huge oak trees were planted in 1902 to mark the coronation of King Edward VII. Just within the main gates, the war memorial was erected in 1922.

Taunton Flower Show has been held annually in the park since the 19th century. It has been described as "The Chelsea of the West", and attracts around 24,000 visitors over its two days.

In 1974, Frederick Jago, a man of 38, broke the world record for non-stop walking by covering a distance of 304.26 miles within the park. This took him 116 hours, 34 minutes, between 27 September and 2 October.

The current lake was created during the 1980s. Originally constructed as a stormwater measure, it is now home to several species of water birds, including mallards, moorhens, ruddy and laysan ducks, Chinese geese, and kingfishers.
