= Jellalabad Barracks, Taunton =

Military installation in Taunton

Jellalabad Barracks
- Taunton
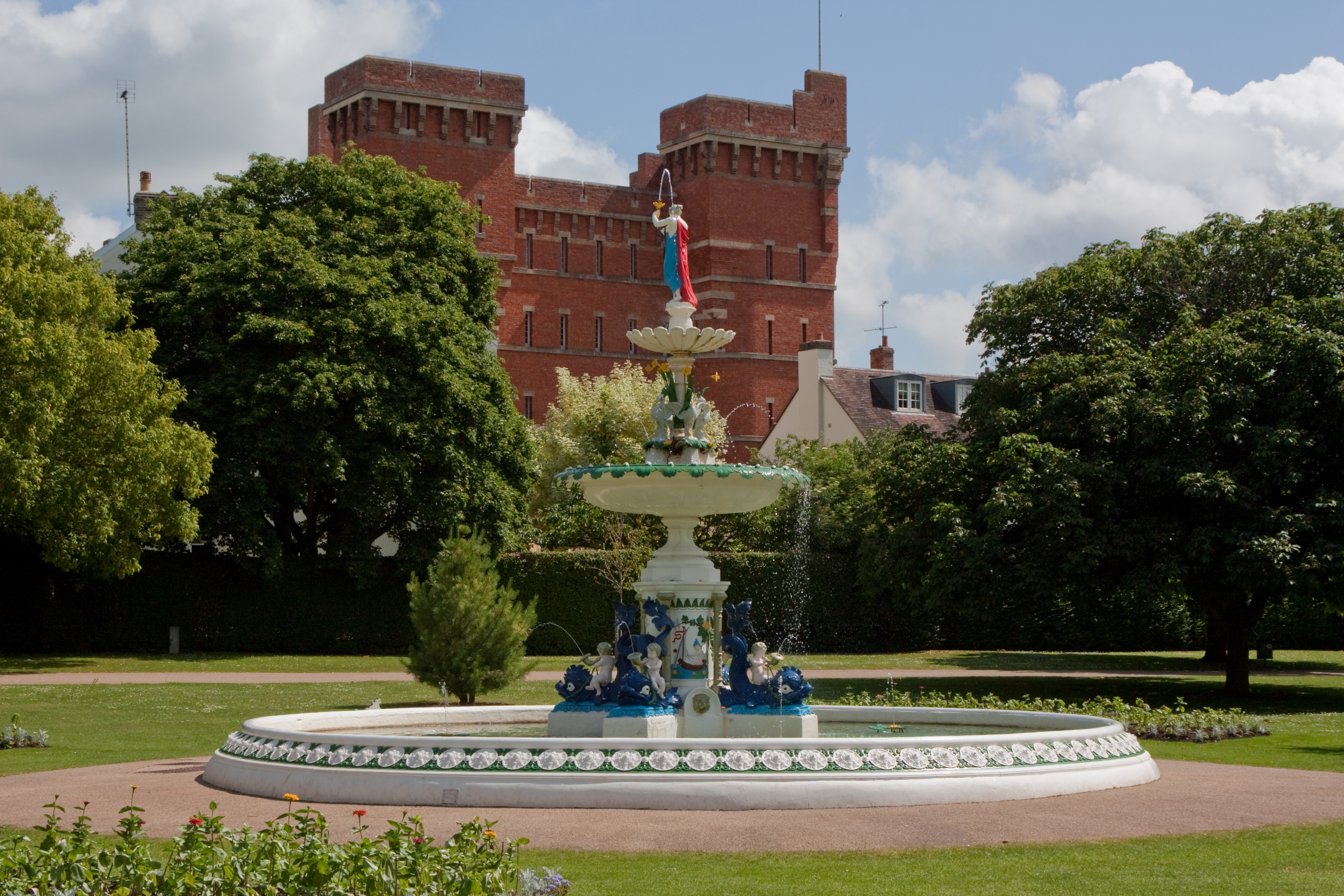
- Jellalabad Barracks at Taunton with the Vivary Park Queen Victoria Memorial Fountain of 1907 in the foreground

Site information
- Type: Barracks
- Owner: Ministry of Defence
- Operator: British Army

Location
- Location within Somerset
- Coordinates: 51.01123°N 3.10132°W

Site history
- Built: 1879–1881
- Built for: War Office
- In use: 1881-1999

Garrison information
- Occupants: Somerset Light Infantry

Jellalabad Barracks was a military installation in Taunton.

== History ==
The barracks were built in the Fortress Gothic Revival Style and were completed between 1879 and 1881. Their creation took place as part of the Cardwell Reforms which encouraged the localisation of British military forces. The barracks became the depot for the two battalions of the 13th (1st Somerset) Regiment of Foot. The barracks were named after the Battle of Jellalabad in which the regiment had taken part. Following the Childers Reforms, the regiment evolved to become the Somerset Light Infantry with its depot in the barracks in 1881.

Many recruits enlisted at the barracks at the start of the First World War. The regiment remained at the barracks until it amalgamated with the Duke of Cornwall's Light Infantry to form the Somerset and Cornwall Light Infantry in 1959. After the Somerset and Cornwall Light Infantry moved out, the barracks were taken over by the Royal Army Pay Corps (RAPC) and became the Regimental Pay Office, Taunton. The barracks were sold for residential development in the early 1990s. Although many of the buildings were demolished in 1999, the keep still survives and is now a Grade II listed building.
