= Geoffrey Archer =

Geoffrey Archer may refer to:

- Geoffrey Archer (writer) (born 1944), English fiction writer
- Geoffrey Archer (colonial administrator) (1882–1964), British colonial administrator

== See also ==
- Jeffrey Archer (1940–2026), English author and politician
- Jofra Archer (born 1995), Barbadian-born English cricketer
