= Phil Vickery (chef) =

English chef (born 1961)

- Born: Philip Vickery; 2 May 1961 (age 65); Folkestone, Kent, England
- Occupations: Celebrity chef, food writer
- Years active: 1996–present
- Employer(s): BBC (former); ITV (current)
- Known for: Ready, Steady, Cook, This Morning
- Spouse: Fern Britton (m. 2000; sep. 2020)
- Children: 1
- Website: http://vickery.tv

Philip Vickery (born 2 May 1961) is an English celebrity chef. He is best known for working on ITV's This Morning, where he has been a Chef since 2006.

== Career ==
Vickery followed Gary Rhodes as head chef of the Castle Hotel, Taunton, Somerset, which at the time held a Michelin Star. It lost its Michelin status under Vickery, but retained its 4 AA rosettes, while he gained the AA Chef of the Year. Vickery regained the Michelin star, re-awarded for four consecutive years from 1994 to 1997. Vickery has written twelve books. The first, "Just Food", was published by Headline in 1999. He appeared in BBC's Ready Steady Cook over 200 times between 1996 and 2010 until the show's retirement, often being nicknamed "Phil Victory" due to his high win record in the series.

He currently appears on the television programme This Morning as a resident chef.

In September 2008, Vickery began advertising food products and promoting special offers for supermarket chain Aldi, after signing a two-year deal with the chain. He is also the current spokesperson for Unilever's Stork brand margarine. He was appointed Food Ambassador in March 2010 by Coeliac UK. He became interested in the subject of gluten-free food when a Christmas pudding company he owned switched to using rice flour, and he noticed an increase in orders due to the niche position the product occupied.

== Family ==
Vickery is the second of three sons of Robert and Teresa Vickery. They were born at Folkestone, then raised at Densole in Hawkinge near Folkestone. He began dating Fern Britton in 1999 after they met on the set of BBC Two's Ready Steady Cook. They married in spring 2000. Vickery has one daughter with Britton, Winifred (2001) and is stepfather to Britton's three children from her first marriage. Vickery and Britton announced on their Twitter accounts on 29 January 2020 that they were separating after 20 years of marriage.

== Books ==
- Just Food (1999)
- Phil & Fern's Family Food (2002)
- Proof of the Pudding (2003)
- The Complete Gammon Cookbook (2006)
- A Passion for Puddings (2006)
- Ready Steady Cook: The Ten-minute Cookbook (with Ross Burden, Gino D'Acampo, James Martin and Nick Nairn (2006)
- Cooking Naked (2007)
- Britain: The Cookbook (with Lee Steve) (2007)
- The Little Book of Great British Turkey Recipes (2008)
- Phil Vickery's Puddings (2009)
- Seriously Good! Gluten-Free Cooking (2009)
- Seriously Good! Gluten-Free Baking (2010)
- The Great Outdoors Cookbook (2011)
- Pork (2013)
- Game (2014)
- Seriously Good! Gluten Free Cooking, 2nd Edition (2016)
- Essential Gluten Free (2016)
