= Rosewell =

Rosewell may refer to:

== Places ==
- Rosewell, Midlothian, former mining town in Midlothian, Scotland
- Rosewell, Virginia, United States
- Rosewell Plantation, in Gloucester County, Virginia, United States, home of members of the Page family

== People ==
- Benjamin Rosewell (attorney) (c. 1720-1782), Attorney of Throgmorton Street, London
- Benjamin Rosewell (shipwright) (c. 1665-1737), Master Shipwright of Chatham Dockyard
- Bridget Rosewell, British economist
- Henry Rosewell (1590-1656), of Forde Abbey, Devon and grandson of William Rosewell
- John Rosewell (1882-1938), pioneer Australian rugby union and rugby league player
- John Rosewell (headmaster) (1635-1684), Headmaster of Eton College
- Samuel Rosewell (1679-1722), nonconformist minister of Hackney, London
- Thomas Rosewell (1630-1692), nonconformist minister of Rotherhithe, Surrey
- Walter Rosewell (c. 1610-1658), Presbyterian minister of Chatham, Kent
- William Rosewell (Solicitor-General) (c. 1520-1566), Solicitor-General to Queen Elizabeth I
- William Rosewell (apothecary) (c.1606-c.1680), Soldier and Royal Apothecary
- William Rosewell (gentleman) (c.1500-1570), of Loxton, Somerset

== See also ==
- Roswell (disambiguation)
