= William Rosewell (gentleman) =

William Rosewell (c. 1500–1570) was a gentleman and landholder of Loxton, Somerset, England. He was the father of William Rosewell (died 1566) the Solicitor-General to Queen Elizabeth I. He was named as one of the trustee in his son's will of 1566 and managed his son's estates in Somerset while his son's children were under age.

== Family ==
William Rosewell (Rowswell, Rowsewell, Ruswell, Rewsell) was born about 1500, the fourth son of Richard Rosewell (Rowswell) (c. 1473–1543) of Bradford on Tone, Somerset who married Alice Seeley (Ceelie, Ceelye, Scelye) of North Curry, Somerset.

His brothers were: John Rowswell of Bradford on Tone; Reverend Adam Rowswell; and William Rosewell (Rowswell) of Dunkerton, Somerset. (Note: The visitations for Somerset are in error as they show the eldest son as Richard Rowswell rather than John.)

- John Rowswell (died 1553) married Agnes Dyer, daughter of Richard Dyer of Wincanton, Somerset (and sister of Sir James Dyer) and had five sons: Richard, George, Alexander, Peter and Augustine; and five daughters: Elizabeth, Katherine, Thomazine, Joan and Dorothy.
- Adam Rowswell (died 1567) was rector of Orcheston St George, Wiltshire in 1532; vicar of Clevedon, Somerset in 1558; and rector of Shepton Mallet, Somerset in 1559.
- William Rosewell (1499-1568) married (1) Joan Fontneys (one son: John Rosewell of Englishcombe) and (2) Agnes Tilley (two sons: Thomas and William; and two daughters: Joan and Margaret). William of Dunkerton was the 2nd great-grandfather of Reverend Thomas Rosewell.

He had one sister, Joan, who married Thomas Foreacre (Foweraker, Voraker) of Bradford on Tone.

One source suggests that Agnes Dyer of Wincanton married William Rosewell of Loxton but she married William's brother, John. (Note: In the will of Sir James Dyer of 1581 he mentions 'my sister Agnes Rousewell late deceased' and leaves all her children married or unmarried £40 except Alexander.) No record of the marriage of William Rosewell has been found and a wife is not mentioned in his will of 5 July 1570 so it is presumed that she had predeceased him. However, the parish records for Loxton show two burials which provide evidence of a wife and her name: William Rewsell, 17 July 1570 and Agnes (Note: Also transcribed as 'Ares', and 'Mres Rowsell' which may be an abbreviation for 'Mistress Rowsell'.) Rewsell, 17 April 1569. His wife may have been the widow of someone named Dyer as, in his will, William makes a bequest to his daughter in law (step daughter?) Joan Dyer. He also claims kinship with the Smythie (Smythe) family of Bristol and Wrington, Somerset, so his wife may have been a member of that family.

In his will he names two children: his son William, deceased; and daughter Agnes married to George Badram (Budram). George Badram is identified as a cousin by Robert Smythe of Bristol. (Note: Will of Robert Smythes of Bristol, 30 July 1585 ‘and I do ordayne and make my good cozen Mr George Badram and John Smythes the sonne of George Smithes my brother overseers..’.)

== Activities ==
No records have been found about the life of William Rosewell from his birth at Bradford on Tone about 1500 until he was established as a landholder in Loxton by about 1540. Later recorded events and details in his will indicate that he was an educated and well-respected man of some means. He was related to, and friends of, influential people and was prepared to invest in the education of his son, William, who became Solicitor-General.

He was named as overseer in the 1541 will of William Davys of Bleadon; overseer in the 1545 will of Thomas Willinson, Parson of Christon; and witnessed the 1546 will of Robert Alan of Loxton. In 1556 he and his son, William, purchased the manor and advowson of Yarlington, Somerset. He was the collector of subsidy in Bath Forum Hundred in 1557. In 1564 with son William and nephew Thomas Rosewell of Dunkerton he purchased Limington Manor, Somerset. By the time of the Somerset Muster in 1569, when he was acting as trustee of his son's estates, he was recorded in the tithing of Loxton and Uphill as: "William Rowsewell, gent, one corslet, one gelding for a light horseman furnished, one harquebut, one murrion, one paire of almain rivets furnished."

== Significance ==
=== Achievements ===
William Rosewell was able to achieve a significant improvement in his social status from that of his father, Richard Rowswell tenant of Bradford, to that of Yeoman at Loxton in 1544 and to Gentleman in 1569. The title of Gentleman would have come from a recognition and general acceptance that he was a member of the landed gentry. He sub-leased land at Loxton from Thomas and John Payne whose lease was granted by Lord John Mordaunt (died 1562). In 1544 he held copyhold land at Compton Bishop and with his son had bought the Manor of Yarlington in 1566.

His brother, William of Dunkerton, had also joined the landed gentry by 1544. After the dissolution of the monasteries he acquired assets of Keynsham Abbey: for example, in 1544 a grant in fee of lands in Compton Dando, including chief messuage and Grange, and High Littleton rectory and advowson with all lands, glebes, tithes, etc. With John Hippisley (died 1558), gentleman, he bought Ston Easton Manor c. 1545 for £457-3s-4d; with son, Thomas, Stanton Prior Manor and advowson in 1553 and Farrington Gurney Manor in 1558.

=== Assets ===
Whilst it is clear that the dissolution of the monasteries provided an increase in the availability of new land and the opportunity for lease or purchase, it is not clear how the Rosewell family gained the financial means to do so.

The father, Richard, was apparently a husbandman with no indication of his wealth. There was no mention in the abstract of his will of any free land or property although this is not unusual in such wills at that time, unlike his cousin in Hillfarrance, William Rousewill (died 1522), who left free land and a flock of sheep at Otterford to his youngest son. There is no information available on how much land or other sources of wealth was held by Richard. Although he had been promised money by his wife's father, William Seeley, on their marriage, he had not received any or all of it by 1529.

Richard's parents were John (Jenkyn) (died 1499) and Anastasia Rowswell of Bradford. In his will, John made small bequests of just £2 to each of his children. However, the family had previously received substantial fines for supporting the 1497 rebellion against Henry VII (John £20, Anastasia £6 and Richard 10 marks) indicating that they did have some assets. At the same time William Seeley of North Curry was fined £6.

Richard Rowswell must have prospered to have the means to establish his sons on leases at Bradford, Dunkerton and Loxton respectively. This may have been in the same way as John Hippisley, of Ston Easton, who advanced from the son of a husbandman in 1528 to gentleman and Lord of the manor in 1545. His prosperity is attributed to an increase in food prices around the turn of the century. The Tudor period generally has been identified as a time when farming was for profit rather than for survival. Those with the drive to succeed could do so.

The Rosewell family appear to have had the drive and ambition to succeed and they valued education as a means to achieve both careers for their sons and a higher social position. The improvements were incremental with each generation's successes creating opportunities and connections for the next to exploit.

=== Education ===
William Rosewell's Uncle, Thomas Rowsewell, attended Oxford University and was the incumbent of Bradford church from 1517 to 1558. His fees at Oxford were a bequest in the 1509 will of Thomas Austell, Treasurer of Exeter Cathedral. His brother, Adam, and two cousins from Hillfarrance also graduated from Oxford with one of the latter graduating D.C.L. in 1528. William of Loxton sent his son to be educated at Middle Temple leading to a career in law. His descendants, ending with Sir Henry Rosewell, also followed this path. The descendants of William of Dunkerton created an ecclesiastic dynasty including notable clerics such as Thomas Rosewell, Samuel Rosewell and Walter Rosewell. Whilst it later became common for the landed gentry to send their children to be educated at University or Inns of Court, the Rosewell tenants of Bradford appear to have been early adopters of this practice as a means of improving their position.

=== Independence ===
There were other changes taking place throughout the fifteenth century which would have influenced this family. The Black Death of 1348, and recurrences of plague later in the century, greatly reduced the population and led to competition for labour between manors with a consequent weakening of the lord's hold over his tenants. By the fifteenth century many manorial landlords derived their entire income from rents rather than from the sale of produce provided by tenant labour; but even rent income was threatened by the frequent unwillingness of tenants to take anything but the best land. The late fifteenth and early sixteenth century was a time of increasing confidence and assertiveness of the tenants as illustrated by the following case in the Court of Requests published by the Selden Society.

William's father, Richard Rowswell, died in Bradford on Tone in March or April 1543. At the next Bradford manor court, held in May 1543, his mother, Alice, tried to be registered as heir for her lifetime, but the lords refused to accept her for one of the holdings, and demanded a larger fine (inheritance tax) for the other, than the tenants regarded as normal. Two tenants (Thomas Foreacre and Richard Person) sued the lords (William Frauncys and Richard Warre) over this and other similar cases. Thomas Foreacre was William’s brother-in-law.

'The land held by a Richard Rowswell in 1543 as copyhold was the house he lived in plus two holdings of farmland called Parkes and Furlonges, respectively, perhaps totaling about 7 or 8 acres. He may have had other land but these two holdings were chosen as one of the test cases brought by the tenants against their lords. Both holdings were copyhold, but the manor contained two types of copyhold, ordinary customary land and 'overland', and these holdings were one of each. Both sides produced evidence as to what the manor's local laws were. (Note: John Rowswell of Bradford, William's brother and tenant of the manor, provided evidence to the court.) In the end the lords won on most points, because they looked through the old manorial records and found examples of previous inheritances which proved their case'.

Like many other tenants, the Rosewell family became increasingly independent of their own manor and looked elsewhere for land to purchase or lease.

=== Connections ===
According to their wills, William Rosewell and his son were friends of Humphrey Colles of Barton Grange, Corfe and Pitminster, Somerset, who had ‘made his mark and fortune as an agent in the buying of ex-monastic land’ following the dissolution of the monasteries between 1536 and 1541. This friendship, together with his son's position as Solicitor-General, would have made William Rosewell's family well placed to take advantage of the increased availability of land and to firmly establish themselves as landed gentry.

== Will ==
Will of William Rowsewell, of Loxton, Somerset, gentleman. Will dated 5 July 1570 and proved 12 August 1570. (Note: The abstract provided here differs significantly from that previously published.)

Agnes my daughter and George Badram, shall enjoy all my lands, etc., in Loxton, which I hold of Thomas and John Payne. Parry Rowsewell, son of my son William Rowsewell deceased, all my copyhold lands of the manor of Compton [Compton Bishop]. William Rowsewell, second son of my son William Rowsewell, deceased, rents from my farm at Yarlington. If Parry and William shall die before maturity then George and William Dale sons of Henry Dale of Yatton and Agnes their sister shall benefit.

Bequests: Phillipa Rowsewell daughter of my son William Rowsewell deceased. Agnes Dale daughter of Henry Dale of Yatton and Edith his late wife. Joan Badram daughter of George Badram and Agnes his wife. To Agnes Badram £10; Joan Dyer my daughter in law [step-daughter?] an annuity of £20 and my kinsman William Seeley an annuity of £2 both for 'the yearly running and going forth of all my Manorial Lands and Tenements in Somerset'. William Rowsewell my kinsman [nephew] and servant £5. (Note: Rector of Yarlington 1573-1627.)

Supervisors: Humfrey Colles [of Pitminster], John Colles [of Pitminster], Thomas Rowsewell [of Dunkerton], Robert Smythie [of Bristol], George Smythie [of Wrington], William Seeley [of North Curry] and Henry Dale [of Yatton].

Overseers: Humfrey Colles, my kinsman [nephew] Thomas Rowsewell of Dunkerton, my kinsman George Smythies and my kinsman Robert Smythies.

Executors: George Badram and Agnes his wife.

== Death ==
William Rosewell died and was buried at Loxton on 17 July 1570.
