= William Rosewell =

William Rosewell may refer to:

- William Rosewell (Solicitor-General) (c. 1520–1566), Solicitor-General to Queen Elizabeth
- William Rosewell (gentleman) (c. 1500–1570), gentleman and landholder of Loxton, Somerset
- William Rosewell (apothecary) (c. 1606–c. 1680), London apothecary and Royalist soldier
