= Benjamin Rosewell =

Benjamin Rosewell may refer to:

- Benjamin Rosewell (attorney) (c. 1720–1782), English attorney
- Benjamin Rosewell (shipwright) (c. 1665–1737), English master shipwright
