= Dunkerton =

Dunkerton may refer to:

== Places ==
- Dunkerton, Iowa, United States
- Dunkerton, Somerset, England

== Other uses ==
- Dunkerton (surname), a surname
