= Thomas Rosewell =

Reverend Thomas Rosewell (3 May 1630 – 14 February 1692) was a Nonconformist minister of Rotherhithe, Surrey who was found guilty of treason but subsequently pardoned by King Charles II.

== Early years and education ==
Thomas was born 3 May 1630 at Dunkerton, Somerset. He was the only son of Richard Rosewell (d. 1640) of Dunkerton, gentleman, and Grace Melborne (d. 1646). Thomas was raised by his uncle, James Rosewell, of Combe Hay, Somerset and attended King Edward's School, Bath. In 1645 he was sent to London to learn to be a silk-weaver. In 1646 a distant relation (father-in-law of first cousin), Humphrey Chambers, one of the Westminster Divines, and his first cousin, Reverend Walter Rosewell, persuaded James to educate him for the ministry. Thomas entered Pembroke College, Oxford in 1648 where he graduated B.A. in 1651.

== Relations ==
The ancestors of Thomas Rosewell came from Bradford-on-Tone, Somerset. Richard Rowswell (d.1543) married Alice Ceelie (Seeley) of North Curry. They had one daughter and four sons: Joanne married Thomas Foreaker of Bradford; John Rowswell married Agnes Dyer of Wincanton, sister of Sir James Dyer; William Rosewell (1499-1568) purchased the manor of High Littleton and lived at Dunkerton; Rev. Adam Rosewell (d. 1567) was vicar of Orcheston St George, Clevedon and Shepton Mallet; and a fourth son, also named William Rosewell (d. 1570), held land at Loxton and Compton Bishop. William Rosewell of Loxton was the father of William Rosewell, Solicitor General to Queen Elizabeth I and they jointly purchased the manor of Yarlington, Somerset.

William Rosewell (1499-1568) of Dunkerton

+ (i) Joan Fontneys

John Rosewell (d.1605) of Englishcombe. Married twice with many children by each wife.

+ (ii) Agnes Tilley

Thomas Rosewell (1533-c.1602) of Dunkerton
+ Margaret Attwood of Doynton, Gloucestershire

William Rosewell (c.1561-c.1620) of Dunkerton
+ Cecilia Coddrington

Richard Rosewell (1588-1640) of Dunkerton
+ Grace Melborne of Dunkerton

Rev. Thomas Rosewell (1630-1692)

== Marriages ==
Thomas married (1) Susannah Strickland (d. 1661) daughter of John Strickland of Salisbury, Wiltshire on 29 May 1656 and (2) a widow, Anne Godsalve (née Wanley) on 9 Jan 1677. He had three children by his first wife: Susannah; Elizabeth; and Margaret, who married the Nonconformist bookseller John Lawrence; and four by the second: Susannah; Rhoda; Samuel; and Eliezer.

== Career and ministries ==
In 1652 he took the post of tutor to the nephew of John Dodridge at Weare Gifford, Devon. He was presented to the rectory of Rode, Somerset by the widow of Sir Edward Hungerford in May 1653 and was ordained at Salisbury in 1654 by the Presbyterians John Strickland rector of Salisbury, Wiltshire and Peter Ince rector of Donhead St Andrew, Wiltshire. He exchanged ministries for Sutton Mandeville, Wiltshire in 1657 in order for his wife to be nearer to her father in Salisbury.

He was ejected by the uniformity act in 1662 and became, in 1663, chaplain and tutor in Lady Hungerford's family at Corsham, Wiltshire. He suffered a slight mental disturbance in 1671 and moved as tutor to the family of Thomas Grove of Ferne near Berwick St John, Wiltshire. He developed depression and went to live in the house of Luke Rugeley, M.D. from October 1673 to February 1674 when he was completely recovered.

During his life, Thomas Rosewell published two books: An Answer unto Thirty Questions Propounded by the Quakers (1656) and The Causes and Cure of the Pestilence (1665).

On 5 May 1674 he was elected as Nonconformist minister at Rotherhithe, Surrey.

== Tried for treason ==
His fame rests on his sensational trial for high treason in 1684. In a sermon preached on 14 September that year Rosewell allegedly declared that 'we have had two wicked kings now together who have suffered popery to be introduced under their noses...'. He was arrested on 18 September and was tried in Westminster Hall by "Hanging" Judge Jeffries.

The charge against him, that of treasonable preaching pointing to the king's death, was absurdly at variance with the whole of his previous character and known opinions. Thomas conducted his own defence and argued over the meaning of the charges written in Latin compared to the English words that he actually used. Evidence against him was tendered by three women of disreputable character, one of whom admitted that she had been paid to collect evidence. It is not clear from their sworn testimony whether they wilfully distorted his words or mistook his meaning. Despite clear counter-evidence presented by numerous witnesses, the jury, directed by Jeffreys, found him guilty of treason for which the penalty would have been death by beheading. However, he was not sentenced.

When he came for sentence on 24 November, he argued his exception to the indictment as being deficient in the English interpretation of the original Latin. Jeffries acceded to Thomas's appeal for Counsel to argue a case about the sentence but would not agree to provide a copy of the indictment. Jeffries took Counsel's argument under consideration and released Thomas on bail.

His arrest and conviction had shocked and enraged Presbyterians and Anglicans alike. On 28 January 1685 Charles II granted him a pardon, having been told by Sir John Talbot: "If your majesty suffers this man to die, we are none of us safe in our houses".

The whole proceedings of this trial was reported and is referred to in more recent works on the proper conduct of trial by jury.

== Death ==
He died at Bermondsey, Surrey on 14 Feb 1692 and was buried at Bunhill Fields, London. The funeral service was conducted by three Presbyterian and three Independent ministers. Mathew Mead, Independent minister of Stepney, preached his funeral sermon.

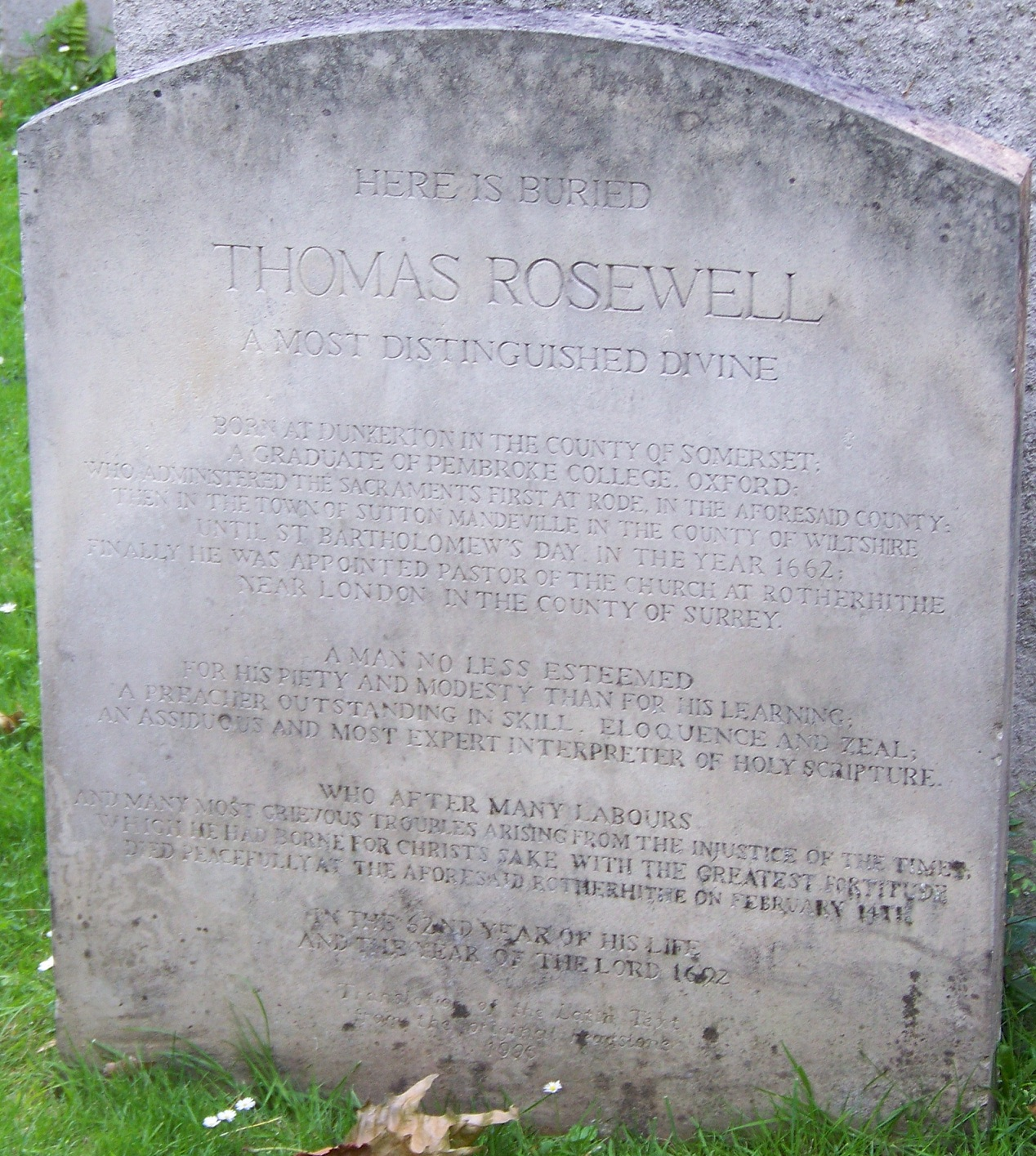
Rosewell's grave in Bunhill Fields.

The original headstone was inscribed in Latin. Some time later, a new headstone was erected at the rear of the original and it was inscribed with an English translation of the Latin text as follows:

Here is buried THOMAS ROSEWELL a most distinguished divine.
Born at Dunkerton in the county of Somerset: A graduate of Pembroke College, Oxford: Who administered the sacraments first at Rode in the aforesaid county: Then in the town of Sutton Mandeville in the county of Wiltshire until St Bartholomew's day in the year 1662: Finally he was appointed pastor of the church at Rotherhithe near London in the county of Surrey.
A man no less esteemed for his piety and modesty than for his learning; a preacher outstanding in skill, eloquence and zeal; an assiduous and most expert interpreter of Holy Scripture.
Who after many labours and most grievous troubles arising from the injustice of the times, which he had borne for Christ's sake with the greatest fortitude, died peacefully at the aforesaid Rotherhithe on February 14th.
In the 62nd year of his life and the year of the Lord 1692.
