= Church of St Peter & St Paul, North Curry =

Church in Somerset, England

Church of St Peter & St Paul
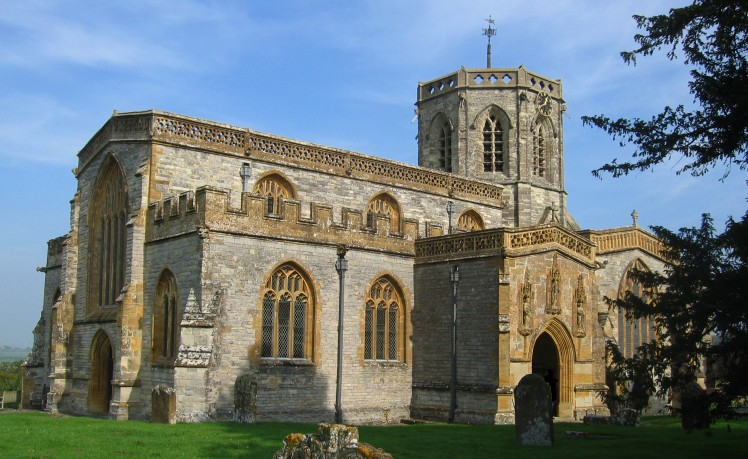

- Location within Somerset

General information
- Location: North Curry, England
- Coordinates: 51.0255°N 2.9719°W
- Completed: c1300

The Church of St Peter & St Paul in North Curry, Somerset, England, is nicknamed ‘The Cathedral of the Moors’. It dates from the 14th century and has been designated a Grade I listed building.

The church is Norman in origin, with the lower stages of tower, transepts and nave being built around 1300. Only the north doorway survives from the original church built by Bishop Reginald Fitz Jocelin. In the 14th century the upper stage of the tower was added and in 1502 the chancel was rebuilt, the porch added and the walls of clerestory raised. Some minor restoration including the parapet of the tower was carried out in 1832 by Richard Carver. Later in the 19th century the north aisle wall and door were taken down and re-built and the vestry added, by John Oldrid Scott.

The church was erected on the site of an earlier church. Episcopal records in Wells mention a church in North Curry as early as 1199.

The church has a good view of the Levels and moors, with benches placed for walkers and other visitors. To assist visitors tracing their ancestry to North Curry, the church has posted a map of the graves in the cemetery.

In August 2007, North Curry Church was incorporated into the Athelney benefice of the Church of England. The vicar of the Athelney benefice covers the parishes of Burrowbridge, Lyng, North Curry, and Stoke St Gregory.

== Gallery ==
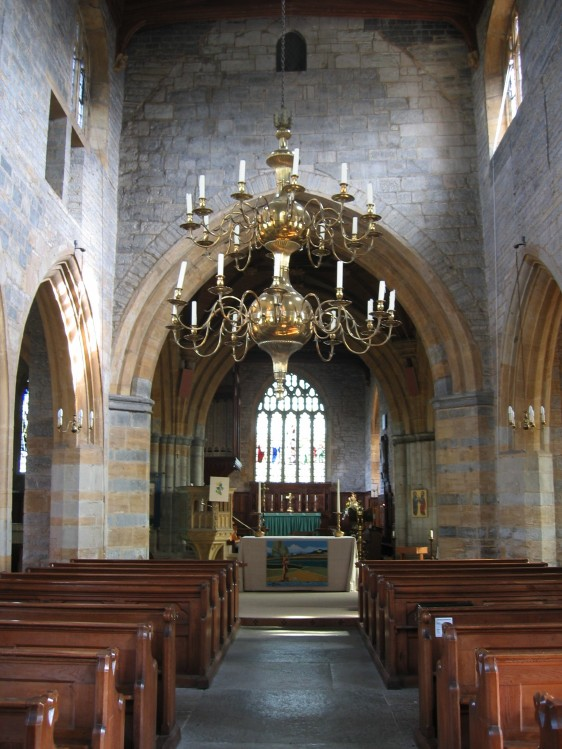
Main aisle of North Curry church

== See also ==
- List of Grade I listed buildings in Taunton Deane
- List of towers in Somerset
- List of ecclesiastical parishes in the Diocese of Bath and Wells
