= Thorncombe =

Village in Dorset, England

Coordinates: 50.8257°N 2.8853°W

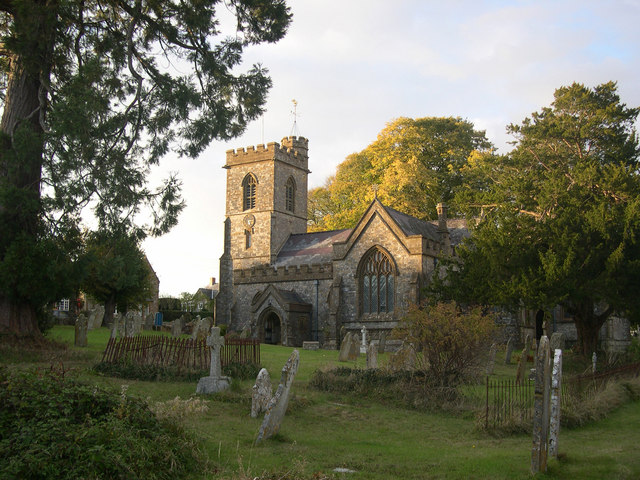
- St Mary's Church, Thorncombe

- Location within Dorset
- Population: 687
- OS grid reference: ST376033
- Unitary authority: Dorset
- Ceremonial county: Dorset
- Region: South West
- Country: England
- Sovereign state: United Kingdom
- Post town: CHARD
- Postcode district: TA20
- Dialling code: 01460
- Police: Dorset
- Fire: Dorset and Wiltshire
- Ambulance: South Western
- UK Parliament: West Dorset

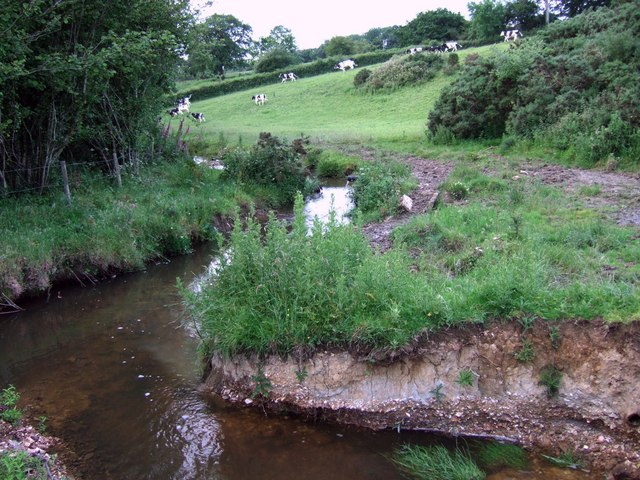
River Synderford

Thorncombe /ˈθɔːrnkəm/ is a village and civil parish in the English county of Dorset. It was historically, until 1844, an exclave of Devon. It lies five miles (8 km) south east of the town of Chard in neighbouring Somerset. Thorncombe is situated close to the borders of both Somerset and Devon. In the 2011 census the population of the civil parish was 687.

== Description ==
Approximately half of the population of the parish live in the village of Thorncombe, the rest are divided between the hamlets of Holditch, Hewood and Synderford, and outlying farms and houses. The layout of Thorncombe village consists of three roads which meet at a "T" in the middle of the village. These roads are Chard Street, Fore Street and High Street.

Chard Street heads north to the Somerset town of Chard. Chard Street is probably the busiest road with the Village Hall, St Mary's Primary School and the housing estates of Gribb View and Tansee Hill. Gribb View breaks from the tradition of most of the village in being mostly brick or rendered buildings, the traditional build of the village being flint-faced cottages, as this stone was readily available from the local area. Tansee Hill, of more recent build, is more in keeping with the village as it consists of both flint-faced and rendered buildings.

Fore Street heads to the east towards Venn and is a more traditional looking part of the village with flint-faced cottages and terraced housing down its length. Along Fore Street are many of the buildings which previously housed village amenities and services such as the village store, a bakery and two pubs; these are all now used for housing.

High Street heads west and towards Sadborrow and Holditch. The housing in High Street presents a traditional appearance. Halfway along High Street is the recent development of Orchard Lane. This development, like Tansee Hill, is in keeping with the look of the village with traditional-looking buildings, some of which are thatched.

== Geography ==
The parish of Thorncombe is over 5,200 acres (21 km^{2}) in extent and is principally agricultural land. It lies within the Dorset National Landscape. To the east, across the valley of the River Synderford, is the ridge of Blackdown Hill, traversed by the Jubilee Trail, from which there are extensive views of the village and the area. About 2.5 miles (4 km) to the southeast is Pilsdon Pen, Dorset's second highest point.

== History ==
The original church at Thorncombe was dedicated to St Mary by William Brewer, Bishop of Exeter, in 1239. The building of the church, as well as nearby Forde Abbey (founded in 1136), was superintended by Cistercian monks from Waverley, Surrey. Thomas Chard, alias Tyblis, the last Abbot, was Suffragan Bishop to the Bishop of Exeter from 1508 and was appointed Vicar of Thorncombe in 1529, 10 years before he left Forde Abbey at the Dissolution of the Monasteries in 1539.

Local legend has it that Rev. John Bragge, Vicar of Thorncombe from 1644 to 1647, was deprived of his living, probably because he was involved in a royalist plot against Cromwell, and was transported to Barbados. Although this statement appears on several websites, it is incorrect. The truth is less dramatic: Thorncombe’s parish register records John Bragge's burial in the churchyard on 5 April 1647. The Journal of the House of Lords for 3 November 1647 records the presentation of a ‘Petition of the Inhabitants of Thornecombe’. Now in Lambeth Palace Library, it confirms the date of John Bragge's demise. Signed by 62 parishioners, it states that parishioners 'have suffered above these twelve months last past their want of a preaching minister of the Gospel, by reason that John Bragge the last Incumbent by his delinquency agt State was sequestrated unto the time of his death which happened about half a year since'.

The old church stood about 50 yards (46 m) to the south of the present church, where the Wellingtonia tree now stands. In 1770, the church at Thorncombe was not large enough to contain 'the fourth part of the inhabitants'. Thorncombe's population grew from around 885 in 1676 to 1,308 in 1851 and 1,189 in 1871. The present church dedicated to St Mary the Virgin, was built in 1866 to seat 400. There was a significant community of non conformists living in the parish from the late 17th century onwards. In 1689 clothier Robert French registered his Synderford home as a "Protestant Dissenting Meeting Place" and by 1723 there was a Quaker Meeting House and burial ground at Laymore, just outside the parish boundary.

Historically Thorncombe's main industries were spinning, weaving and sheep and cattle breeding. Other small industries included leather production, shoe making and flax processing. During the 18th century there was a weekly market selling 'grain and meat' and serving 'other wants' and an annual Easter fair where 'sheep and other horned cattle' and locally woven 'narrow cloth' were traded. The market ceased trading in 1773 and the last recorded fair took place in 1885. Following the national decline in small scale weaving during the 19th century due to industrialisation, Thorncombe reverted to agriculture, but this has decreased in recent times. There are still a few farms which survive around the village but most residents work in the local towns of Chard, Crewkerne and Bridport.

== Boundary changes ==
Until 1844, the parish of Thorncombe was an exclave of Devon, at which time it was transferred under the Counties (Detached Parts) Act 1844, to Dorset. It was part of Axminster Hundred.

In 1836 the parish, which had been part of the Deanery of Honiton, was transferred ecclesiastically from the Diocese of Exeter to the Diocese of Salisbury. In 1982, the ecclesiastical parish was transferred to the Diocese of Bath and Wells, at which time it became a 'united benefice' sharing a vicar with the neighbouring (Somerset) parishes of Winsham and Cricket St Thomas. In 1999, the parishes joined with others to form the Chard and District Team Ministry. In 2006 Thorncombe together with Winsham was linked with Tatworth, Chaffcombe and Cricket Malherbie with Knowle St Giles to form the Two Shires Benefice.

== Notable residents ==
Famous past inhabitants of Thorncombe include the Puritan Sir Henry Rosewell; the poet, dramatist and Royalist sermoniser Robert Gomersall; the Commonwealth Attorney General, Edmund Prideaux; Queen Anne's Secretary of War Francis Gwyn; the artist Lucien Pissarro; the ethnologist Sir Raymond Firth; the anthropologist Rosemary, Lady Firth; and the art historian Cecil Gould.

== Politics ==
In the UK national parliament, Thorncombe is within the West Dorset parliamentary constituency. As of 2024, the Member of Parliament (MP) is Edward Morello of the Liberal Democrats. He is the first non-Conservative MP since the creation of the constituency in 1885.

After 2019 structural changes to local government in England, Thorncombe is part of the Marshwood Vale ward which elects one member to Dorset Council.

== Church ==
The present church, incorporating a number of items from the old church, was built in 1866–1867 at a cost of £4,000. The foundation stone was laid on 26 April 1866 by Margaret Bragge, widow of Colonel Bragge of Sadborow, and was dedicated by the Bishop of Salisbury on 15 October 1867. It was built in Perpendicular style, the windows being modelled on those of the cloisters of Forde Abbey. Inside the church is a memorial brass commemorating Sir Thomas (died 1419) and Lady Brook (died 1437) of Holditch Manor. This is one of 500 brass memorials recorded in the Lancastrian period 1400–1453.
