= Richard Coppin =

Richard Coppin was a seventeenth-century English political and religious writer, and prolific radical pamphleteer and preacher.

== Late 1640s to late 1650s ==
He was an Anglican clergyman, until 1648, or possibly a lay preacher from Berkshire with little formal education. He is known as an associate of Abiezer Coppe, who wrote an introduction to Coppin's 1649 Divine Teachings. Christopher Hill considers that Coppe took most of his theology from Coppin. After the suppression of episcopacy (9 October 1646) he had attached himself for a short time to the presbyterians in London. He afterwards was an Independent. Based on an inward experience in 1648 he was not to exercise a settled ministry. He began to preach in Berkshire.

He was constantly in trouble, well documented in pamphlets, arising from the 1650 Blasphemy Act. The authorities treated him leniently in the period 1651 to 1655.

He first got into serious trouble by preaching on four successive days in the parish church of Evenlode, Worcestershire. He had been invited by parishioners, with the consent of the rector, Ralph Nevil. Nevil, however, brought neighbouring clergy to discuss matters with Coppin in the church, and eventually got a warrant against him for blasphemy. Coppin was tried before Chief Baron John Wilde at the Worcester assizes on 23 March 1652. The jury found him guilty of denying heaven and hell; but Wilde reproved them for their verdict, and bound over Coppin to appear for judgment at the next assize. By that time his accusers had fresh evidence, relating to Coppin's proceedings at Enstone, Oxfordshire, whereupon Judge Nicholes bound him to appear at the next Oxford assize.

A debate he had at Burford, Oxfordshire in 1651 was recorded by his counterpart on the side of orthodoxy, John Osborne, vicar of Bampton. Osborne was a presbyterian, east vicar at Bampton from 1648 to 1662.

On 10 March 1653 he was tried at Oxford before Serjeant Green; the jury at first disagreed, but eventually found him guilty. Green bound him over to the next assize, when Judge Hutton gave him his discharge. Preaching at Stow-on-the-Wold, Gloucestershire, on 19 March 1654, Coppin was again apprehended and brought for trial at Gloucester on informations before Serjeant Glyn on 22 July. Glyn would not receive the informations, and so the matter ended.

About 1650, Joseph Salmon, minister in Kent, had set up a course of Sunday preaching in Rochester Cathedral. Salmon was an allegorist, and is said to have 'sowed the seeds of ranting familism.' In midsummer 1655 Salmon went abroad, and his followers brought Coppin from London to fill his place. It is probable that his acquaintance with Abiezer Coppe introduced him to the sectaries of Rochester. At the end of September or beginning of October 1655, Walter Rosewell, incumbent of Chatham, went to hear Coppin preach, and gained the impression that he affirmed the peccability of Christ and denied the resurrection of the flesh. Rosewell, with other presbyterians, agreed to conduct a Tuesday lecture in the cathedral to counteract Coppin's heresies. A public discussion was held in the cathedral (from 3 to 13 December) between Coppin and Rosewell, assisted by Daniel French, minister of Stroud, the mayor presiding; before it ended, Gaman, an anabaptist, put himself forward to oppose both parties. On Saturday night, 22 December, Coppin was served with a warrant forbidding him to preach next day, and requiring his attendance before the magistrates on Monday. He preached, not in the cathedral, where a guard of soldiers was set, but in the college-yard, and in the fields.

He was imprisoned on 24 December 1655 as a Ranter, a term which is now contested in historiography. Thomas Kelsey, one of Cromwell's major-generals then based at Dover, took a harder line with Coppin than previously, imposing six months in jail. He defended himself, writing from Maidstone Prison a pamphlet A Blow at the Serpent. Another account was that of Walter Rosewell, pushed out as vicar at Chatham, Kent in 1649, in The serpents subtilty discovered. Before 26 June 1656 he had been set free by habeas corpus.

Coppin's work provoked Edward Garland, vicar at Hartclip (Hartlip, Kent), to reply in kind in 1657, accusing Coppin of heresies. The pamphlet exchange was extended by Coppin's Michael opposing the dragon (1659).

== Legacy ==
Coppin and Gerrard Winstanley both preached universal salvation; and both began to publish in the same year, 1649. The universalist views of their contemporary, Jeremy White, were not published till 1712. Coppin deals moderately with his opponents. His followers seem to have formed a sect; the tenets of 'the Copinists' were later given by S. Rogers (The Post-Boy robb'd of His Mail, 2nd ed. 1706, p. 428). Later he found an admirer in Cornelius Cayley, and a critic in James Relly, a universalist of another type (see his 'The Sadducee detected,' &c. 1764).

== Works ==
- Divine Teachings (1649)
- The Exaltation of All Things in Christ (1649)
- Man's Righteousnesse Examined (1652)
- Saul Smitten for not Smiting Amalek (1653)
- A Man-Child Born (1654)
- Truths testimony and a testimony of truths (1655)
- A Blow at the Serpent (1656)
- Crux Christi (1657)
- Michael opposing the dragon (1659)

== Views ==
He believed in universal salvation, the possibility of return to the state before the Fall of Man, and the equality of women. He treated the Fall and Last Judgment as allegories, and was dismissive of the established church and universities.

He is sometimes presented as a 'moderate' Ranter, or philosopher of Ranterism. Christopher Hill shaded his opinion to 'near-Ranter'.
