= St Mary's Church, Limington =

Church in Somerset, England

Church of Saint Mary
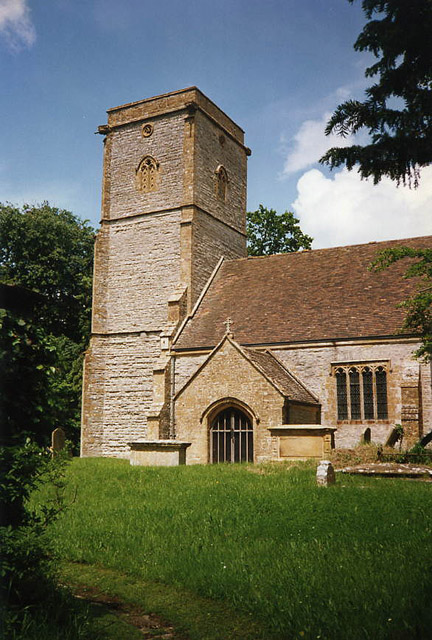

- Location within Somerset
- 50°59′50″N 2°39′12″W
- Location: Limington, Somerset, England

History
- Built: 14th century

Listed Building – Grade I
- Official name: Church of Saint Mary
- Designated: 19 April 1961
- Reference no.: 1056844

The Church of Saint Mary in Limington, Somerset, England dates from the late 14th century and includes fragments of an earlier building. It has been designated as a Grade I listed building.

Fragments of the north door and tower date from the Norman period, but most of the building is from the 14th century with the north chapel being dated to 1328. It is built of local stone with Hamstone dressings. The tower has six bells, the oldest of which is from the 15th century. The interior includes a pulpit and altar table from the 17th century and an octagonal font from the 16th. There are several effigies including one of Sir Richard Gyvernay who built the chantry chapel and died in 1329. Below this is a smaller female figure and there is also a double monument of a male and female figure, which are believed to be Henry and Matilda Power and date from the 1340s.

One rector of renown was Thomas Wolsey who held the living between 1500 and 1509, before becoming a cardinal of the Roman Catholic Church. resident in the parish for at least 5 years he was placed in the stocks by the Sheriff of Somerset for 'drunken and lewd behaviour' at the Merriott fare.

The Anglican parish is part of the benefice of Ilchester with Northover, Limington Yeovilton and Podimore within the archdeaconry of Wells.

== See also ==
- List of Grade I listed buildings in South Somerset
- List of towers in Somerset
- List of ecclesiastical parishes in the Diocese of Bath and Wells
