= Curtis Barnett =

Royal Navy officer (died 1746)

Commodore Curtis Barnett
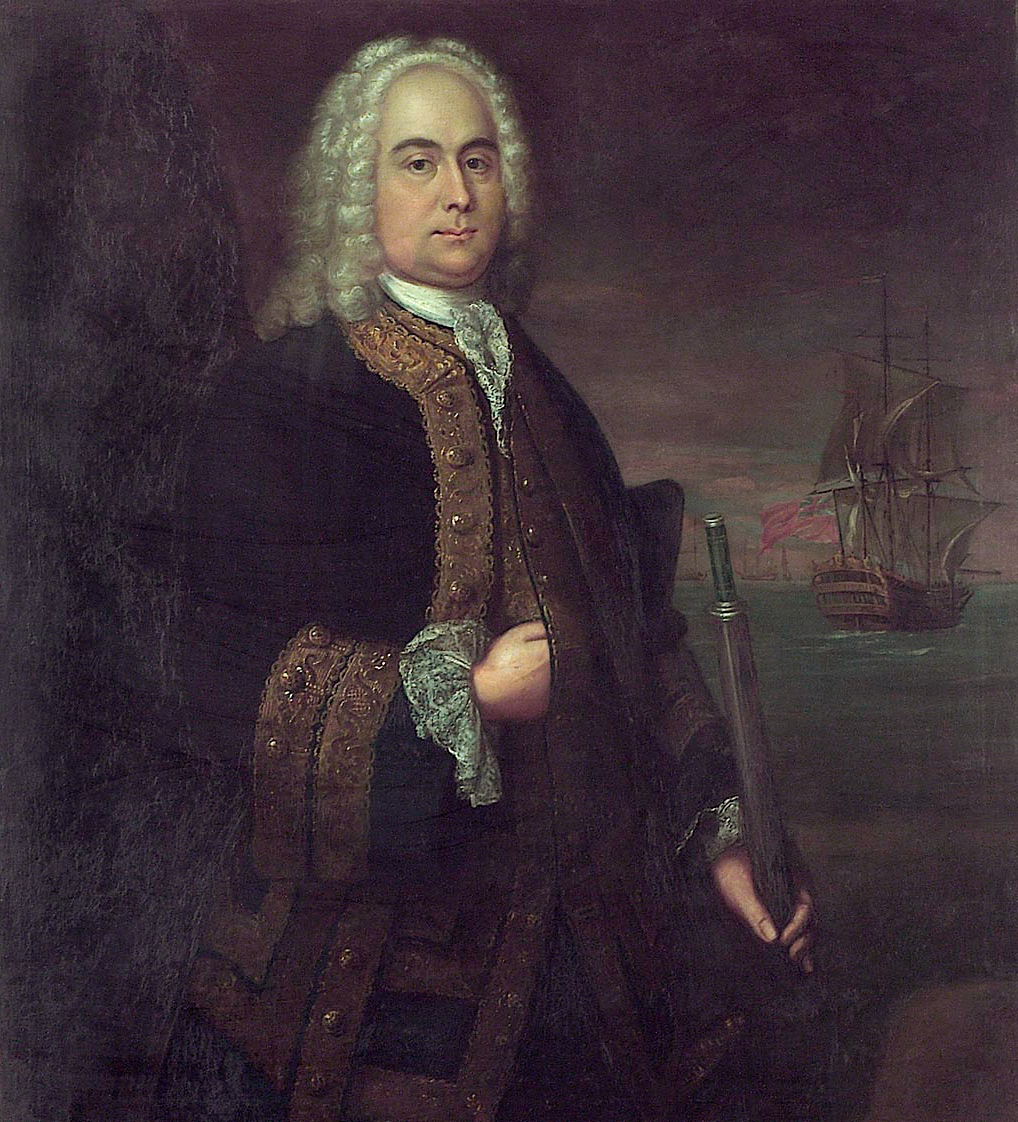
- Commodore Curtis Barnett (John Ellys, 1743)
- Born: Alverstoke, Hampshire
- Died: 2 May 1746; Aboard HMS Harwich, Fort St. David, Cuddalore
- Military career
- Allegiance: Kingdom of Great Britain
- Branch: Royal Navy
- Service years: abt1709 – 1746
- Rank: Commodore
- Commands: HMS Spence; HMS Bideford; HMS Nottingham; HMS Dragon; HMS Prince Frederick; HMS Deptford; Commander-in-Chief, East Indies
- Conflicts: War of the Austrian Succession

Curtis Barnett (died 2 May 1746) was an officer of the Royal Navy. He served during the War of the Austrian Succession, commanding ships in the Mediterranean and in the English Channel, before being appointed a commodore in 1744 he was appointed Commander-in-Chief, East Indies. He served with moderate success, but died after a short illness on board a British ship at Fort St. David, Cuddalore in 1746.

== Family and early life ==
Barnett was reputedly the son of Benjamin Barnett, first lieutenant of HMS Stirling Castle. Benjamin was lost with his ship when she was wrecked on the Goodwin Sands on 27 November 1703, in the Great Storm of 1703. Curtis Barnett's date of birth and his early service is not recorded; but he was already a lieutenant of some standing when, in 1726, he was appointed to HMS Torbay, Sir Charles Wager's flagship in the Baltic cruise of that year, during which he seems to have served on the personal staff of the admiral, in a capacity afterwards known as a flag-lieutenancy.

In the summer of 1730 Barnett was appointed to command the sloop HMS Spence on the coast of Ireland, and early in the following year he was promoted to command the frigate HMS Bideford, then fitting out for the Mediterranean as part of the fleet under Admiral Sir Charles Wager. In October he was at Leghorn and Wager sent him with despatches for the king of Spain, then at Seville. 'The despatches I brought,' he reported to the Admiralty, 'gave great satisfaction to the king of Spain, who was pleased to present me with a diamond ring, and ordered his ministers to thank me for my diligence and despatch' (8 November 1731). On his return through the Straits on 24 November 1731, he encountered a French merchant ship, which fired at Bideford, taking her for a Sallee rover, only to be forced to apologize after a short action. Barnett continued in Bideford as part of the Mediterranean Fleet for three years, returning home in August 1734; and in the following February commissioned the 60-gun HMS Nottingham, for service as a guard ship in the Downs.

== Later commands ==
On 1 August 1737 he turned over to the 60-gun HMS Dragon, and continued in the English Channel for some time after the declaration of war with Spain, when, in October 1740, he was sent out to join Admiral Nicholas Haddock off Cádiz. In July 1741 he was detached with the 40-gun ships HMS Folkeston and Faversham to cruise in the Straits; and on the night of 25 July chased and came up with three French men-of-war homeward bound from the West Indies — the 60-gun Borée, 40-gun Aquilon, and 26-gun Flore. Barnett hailed the Aquilon; she replied they were French from Martinique. Barnett suspected that they were Spaniards. So, after repeated warnings, he fired into the Aquilon; she replied with a broadside, and a sharp action began. The Folkestone only was in company; but about daybreak the Faversham came up, when the Frenchmen brought to, and hoisted their colours. Barnett on this sent a boat on board the Borée, to explain to the French commodore, M. de Caylus, that what had happened was due to the captain of the Aquilon, who had behaved with great want of politeness. M. de Caylus, after some discussion, said that from the manner of the English attack he had concluded there was war between the two countries, and desired the Dragon's officer to declare, on his honour, that there was not; and so the ships separated. It was an unfortunate affair; but there is no reason to suppose it other than a mistake on both sides.

When Haddock was compelled by ill-health to leave the fleet, the command devolved for a short time on Rear-Admiral Richard Lestock, between whom and Barnett a difference of opinion gave rise to a correspondence which, viewed by the light of after events, seems to have an almost prophetic significance. It would appear that in manœuvring the fleet, the Dragon and some of the other ships had not got into their station with that quickness which the admiral wished, and he accordingly wrote a severe reprimand to their respective captains, on 14 April 1742. Barnett replied that it was an understood thing that the ships kept with their own divisions. Lestock, in reply, asked, 'Is it your duty to see two-thirds of the squadron sacrificed to the enemy when you could and did not join in the battle? Such an account would tell but ill to our country after the loss of a battle; but I hope such a thing can never happen to an Englishman.'

== Commodore ==
A few months afterwards Dragon returned to England, and in March 1742 Barnett was appointed to HMS Prince Frederick for Channel service, and was with the fleet under Sir John Norris when the French made their failed attempt to invade and were scattered off Dungeness, on 24 February 1743. A few weeks later he turned over to the 50-gun HMS Deptford, and was appointed commodore of a small squadron ordered to the East Indies. With this he put to sea on 1 May 1744, and on the 26th anchored in Porto Praya. There was already in the bay a Spanish privateer, which at first Barnett had no intention of disturbing, out of respect to the neutrality of Portugal; but being shortly after informed that this same privateer had taken and burnt some English vessels at the Isle of May, he sent his boats on board and took possession of her and her prizes without delay. The prizes he restored to their former owners, and finally sold the privateer to the Portuguese for 1,200 dollars. After they had passed St. Paul's the squadron was divided, part of it making for the Strait of Malacca; whilst Barnett, in Deptford, with the 50-gun HMS Preston, went through the Straits of Sunda to Batavia, and thence for a cruise in the Straits of Banca, where, on 26 January 1744, they encountered, and after some resistance captured, three large French East Indiamen, richly laden from China. The governor of Batavia readily bought them for 92,000l., cash down, which was at once shared out amongst the ships' companies. But with these captures the war in Indian seas was for the time ended. The French had no ships of war to fight with, no more merchant ships to seize, and Barnett's force was not equal to any operations on shore, even if he had been instructed or advised to attempt them.

== Last command ==
The year 1745 was spent in a vague cruise in the Bay of Bengal, backwards and forwards from Ceylon to the mouths of the Ganges; and though two 50-gun ships, HMS Harwich and Winchester, came out as a reinforcement, Deptford and one of the frigates were sent home with a convoy. For the time being the war was at a standstill; and a few weeks before a French squadron appeared on the station, Barnett died onboard Harwich at Fort St. David, Cuddalore, on 2 May 1746, after a few days' sickness. He had married, on 13 May 1725, Elizabeth, a daughter of Benjamin Rosewell, Esq., and had two surviving sons, Charles (1733–1811), later of Stratton Park, Biggleswade, and Benjamin (1735–1805), a banker, ancestor of the Barnetts of Glympton Park.
