= Henry Rosewell =

British Puritan

High Sheriff of Devon
- In office 1629

Personal details
- Born: 1 November 1590 Forde Abbey, Devon, England
- Died: Early 1656 (aged 65) Churston Ferrers, Devon, England
- Spouse(s): Mary Drake (d. 1643); Dorothy Brown
- Relatives: William Rosewell (grandfather)
- Education: Broadgates Hall

Sir Henry Rosewell (1590–1656) of Forde Abbey, Devon, was a puritan and supporter of the New World colonies.

== Early years and education ==
Henry Rosewell was born on 1 November 1590 at Forde Abbey in Devon (Forde Abbey is in the parish of Thorncombe which was transferred from Devon to Dorset in 1842). Henry was the only son of William Rosewell (1561–1593) and Ann Walkeden who were married at St Martins, London on 20 June 1588. William Rosewell had purchased Forde Abbey from Sir Amias Poulet about 1581.

Henry was less than three years old when his father died and his mother, Ann, then married John Davis (later Sir John Davis of Bere Court, Berkshire). Henry was initially the ward of Matthew Dale (Grand Uncle) but John Davis purchased the ward ship in late 1593.

Henry Rosewell matriculated from Broadgates Hall, Oxford in 1606/07 and later that year was a student of the Middle Temple. He was knighted by James I on 19 February 1618/19 at Theobalds in Hertfordshire.

== Relations ==
Henry's grandfather was William Rosewell (c. 1520–1566) who was Solicitor-General to Queen Elizabeth 1559-1566 and owned a number of estates in Somerset and Devon.

== Marriages ==
About the time he received his knighthood, Henry Rosewell married Mary Drake (1594–1643) the daughter of John Drake (c. 1566–1628) (of Ash(e) in the parish of Musbury, Devon) and Dorothy Button. John Drake was the son of Admiral Sir Bernard Drake (c. 1537–1586) of Ashe. Dame Mary Drake died and was buried in Musbury in 1643. Henry remarried Dorothy Brown (a widow). He had no known children by either wife.

== Activities ==
There is no evidence that Henry Rosewell practiced as a lawyer, however he was named in many litigations over money and property from c. 1614 to 1650 both as Plaintiff and Defendant. One of the most interesting was the dispute with William Every over the manor of Stapleton, Somerset. He refused to accept a decree and was ordered to be imprisoned. The case (Ruswell's Case) is described as an example of the use of habeas corpus.

He was patron of the living of Limington, Somerset; and on 30 December 1619, John Conant, of East Budleigh was admitted as rector. John Conant was the brother of Roger Conant, the first governor of the colony in Massachusetts Bay, and it is possible that Henry Rosewell had a personal acquaintance with him, as Roger signed the bond concerning the first fruits of this living. John Conant was the uncle of Rev. John Conant D.D., Fellow of Exeter College, Oxford.

Henry Rosewell was a supporter of the movement to establish a colony in the New World. The Dorchester Company had succeeded in establishing the settlement at Cape Ann, in Massachusetts, but had ceased to exist in 1625. A new company, formed partly of members of the first company, obtained, about 1627, a grant from the Council for New England. The grant was confirmed and a royal charter to form the Massachusetts Bay Company was given on 4 March 1629. Sir Henry Rosewell's name appears first on the list of grantees and he may have been a director or governor (perhaps in name only). Sir Henry had family connections with those involved in both the Dorchester and Massachusetts Bay companies but it is doubtful whether he took an active part in either venture.

He was High Sheriff of Devon in 1629 and Justice of the Peace (listed 1630, 1647 and 1653).

He was evidently a Puritan and was brought before the Court of High Commission in 1634 for holding a private chapel at Forde Abbey.

He commanded a regiment of the Devon Trained Bands for Parliament in the First English Civil War.

It has been suggested that Henry Rosewell was the model for the main character of Hudibras, a mock heroic narrative poem from the 17th century written by Samuel Butler. However, Isaac D'Israeli refutes this in his 'Curiosities of Literature'.

In 1636, his brother-in-law, Sir John Drake (c. 1590–1636), died leaving Sir Henry as one of the executors in the will. Sir John left various areas of land to 'Sir Henry and others' to raise 'portions' (money) for his six daughters. Sir Henry became the scapegoat for the failure of the executors to supply the portions and was subject to a series of suits in Chancery from 1641 to his death in 1656.

'The vast estates obtained by his grandfather seem to have borne the curse of ill-gotten gains snatched from the hands of the Church. The property had been partly wasted by William Rosewell, his father, and Sir Henry was obliged to part with more; lost probably in aiding his Parliamentarian friends, in unsuccessful ventures in America, while most likely a vast amount of it was spent in the Chancery proceedings in which he became involved, through, in an evil day, his having accepted the burdensome trust laid upon him by Sir John Drake'.

He sold Forde Abbey in 1649 to Edmund Prideaux and, at least until 1653, Sir Henry had his residence at Limington, Somerset.

== Death ==
Henry Rosewell made his will 11 August 1653 at Limington by which he left all his property to his 'loving wife, Lady Dorothy Rosewell' and appointed as executrix, Dorothy Browne, daughter of Edward Browne Esquire, who was a minor at the time of Henry's death. Henry Rosewell died at Greenway, Churston Ferrers, Devon and was buried in the churchyard of Brixham, Devon on 3 April 1656. Probate was granted to Dame Dorothy Rosewell 15 May 1656.

== Epilogue ==
The Chancery suits 'continued to appear from time to time, but Dame Ellen Briscoe, who seems to have been the most contentious member of the [Drake] family, was never satisfied; she bided her time until after the Restoration, when, Sir Henry Rosewell having departed this life, she revived the case against his widow, by applying to the House of Lords for an Act to enable her to have sold a part of the manor of Limington, of which Sir Henry Rosewell had been seized at the time of his death.' Dame Dorothy petitioned against this Act but was finally ordered by act of Parliament on 3 March 1663 to sell the manor of Limington to Francis Summers and James Tazewell. James Tazewell was the grandfather of William Tazewell, who emigrated to Virginia in 1715, and ancestor of Henry Tazewell.

Dame Dorothy made her will at Holborn, London on 24 February 1676. She appears to have suffered greatly over the cost of the suits 'whereas in late years I have been involved in several troublesome lawsuits in order to the recovering of my just right, whereby I have contracted several debts and I had undoubtedly sunk under them had I not been supported beyond my expectations by some friends and principally by William Rosewell of Southampton Street in the parish of St Giles in the Fields Esquire'. William Rosewell was probably Major William Rosewell (c. 1606–1680), a London Apothecary and a Commander of the London Trained Bands. He was from North Curry, Somerset, and held houses in Southampton Street in 1678. She made this William Rosewell her sole Executor and left him £100. She died in late 1676 and probate was granted 14 February 1677.

== Sources ==
James, Frances B (1888), 'Sir Henry Rosewell – A Devon Worthy', Transactions of the Devonshire Association, 20, 113–122.
