= Limington =

Village in Somerset, England

Coordinates: 50.9969°N 2.6545°W

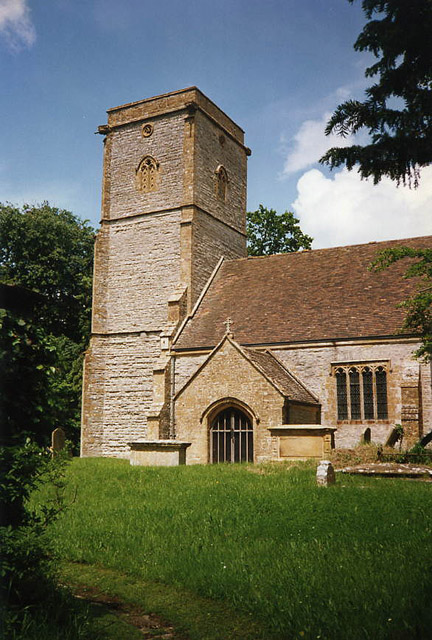
- Church of Saint Mary, Limington

- Location within Somerset
- Population: 199 (2011)
- OS grid reference: ST541221
- Civil parish: Yeovilton and District
- Unitary authority: Somerset Council
- Ceremonial county: Somerset
- Region: South West
- Country: England
- Sovereign state: United Kingdom
- Post town: YEOVIL
- Postcode district: BA22
- Dialling code: 01935
- Police: Avon and Somerset
- Fire: Devon and Somerset
- Ambulance: South Western
- UK Parliament: Glastonbury and Somerton

Limington, also archaically Lymington, is a village and former civil parish, now in the parish of Yeovilton and District, in Somerset, England, situated 5 miles (8.0 km) north of Yeovil. The parish has a population of 199. The parish included the hamlet of Draycott.

It lies near the left bank of the River Yeo opposite Yeovilton.

== History ==
The name of the village means settlement on a stream from Lymn a Celtic word for stream or river.

Before the Norman Conquest the manor was held by Glastonbury Abbey. It then passed to the Courcelles family. The parish of Limington was part of the Stone Hundred.

William Rosewell purchased the manor in 1564 and it was inherited by subsequent generations: William Rosewell of Forde Abbey (1563-1593); Sir Henry Rosewell (1593-1656); and Dame Dorothy Rosewell (1656-1663). Dorothy Rosewell was forced by act of Parliament to sell Limington manor in 1663. The manor was then purchased by James Tazewell who re-built the manor house in 1672. He died in 1683 leaving the manor to his eldest son, James. In 1689 James Tazewell sold it to Virtue Radford and Edward Allen.

== Governance ==
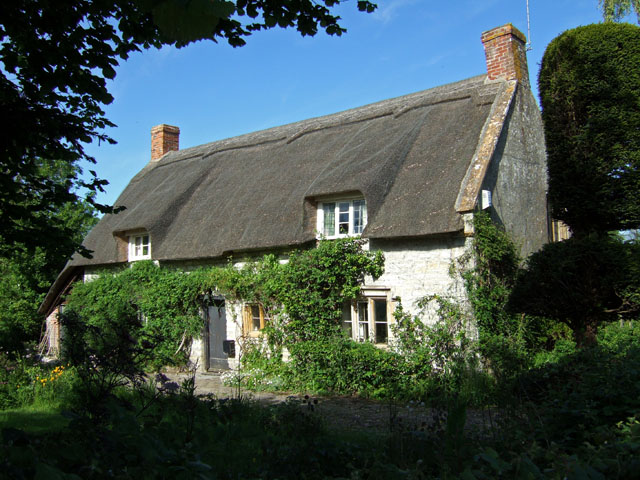
a Cottage in Limington

The parish council has responsibility for local issues, including setting an annual precept (local rate) to cover the council's operating costs and producing annual accounts for public scrutiny. The parish council evaluates local planning applications and works with the local police, district council officers, and neighbourhood watch groups on matters of crime, security, and traffic. The parish council's role also includes initiating projects for the maintenance and repair of parish facilities, as well as consulting with the district council on the maintenance, repair, and improvement of highways, drainage, footpaths, public transport, and street cleaning. Conservation matters (including trees and listed buildings) and environmental issues are also the responsibility of the council.

For local government purposes, since 1 April 2023, the village comes under the unitary authority of Somerset Council. Prior to this, it was part of the non-metropolitan district of South Somerset (established under the Local Government Act 1972). It was part of Yeovil Rural District before 1974.

It is also part of the Glastonbury and Somerton county constituency represented in the House of Commons of the Parliament of the United Kingdom. It elects one Member of Parliament (MP) by the first past the post system of election.

On 1 March 2022 the parish was merged with Yeovilton to form "Yeovilton and District".

== Religious sites ==
The Anglican Church of St Mary dates from the late 14th century and includes fragments of an earlier building. It has been designated as a Grade I listed building.

Thomas Wolsey was the vicar of the parish before becoming a cardinal of the Roman Catholic Church and Lord Chancellor to Henry VIII.
