= North Curry Meadow =

Site of Special Scientific Interest in England

- Site of Special Scientific Interest
- Location within Somerset
- Location of North Curry Meadow.
- Area of search: Somerset
- Grid reference: ST330253
- Coordinates: 51.02315°N 2.95666°W
- Interest: Biological
- Area: 1.3 hectares (0.013 km^{2}; 0.0050 sq mi)
- Notification date: 1989

North Curry Meadow (grid reference ST330253) is a 1.3 hectare (3.1 acre) biological Site of Special Scientific Interest in North Curry, Somerset, England, notified in 1989.

North Curry Meadow is a traditionally-managed hay meadow which contains a rich variety of grasses and dicotyledonous herbs characteristic of ancient, semi-natural lowland grassland. The site contains a population of the nationally scarce Corky-fruited Water-dropwort (Oenanthe pimpinelloides), indicative of a particular type of mesotrophic grassland community which occurs locally in South West England. There is a large population of Green-winged Orchids (Orchis morio) which is favoured by the late hay cut.
