= Dunkerton (surname) =

Dunkerton is English-language toponymic surname originating from Dunkerton, Somerset, England. Notable people with the surname include:

- Julian Dunkerton (born 1965), co-founder of Superdry
- Ross Dunkerton (born 1945), Australian rally driver
