= Forde Abbey =

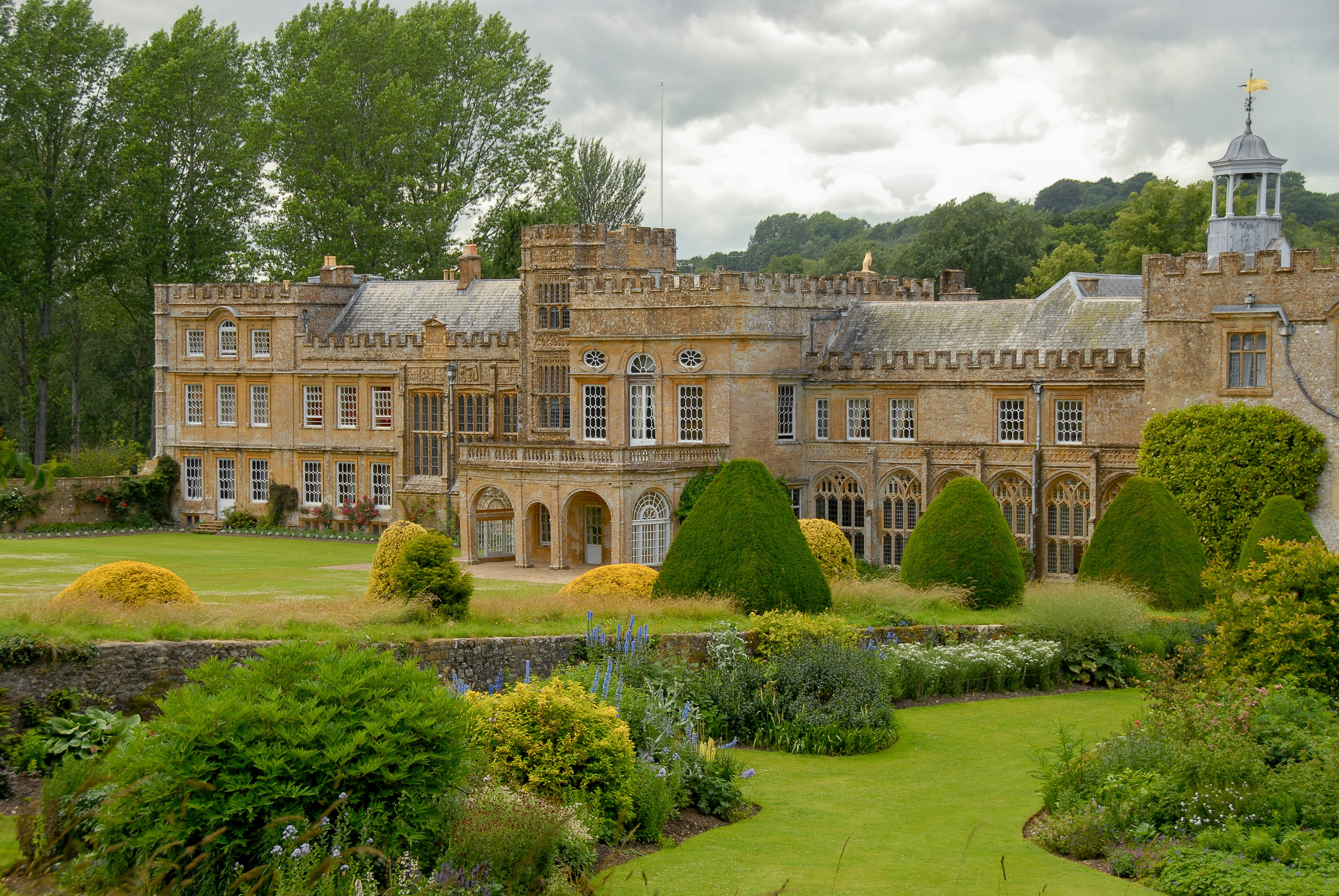
- Forde Abbey
- Interactive map of the Forde Abbey area

General information
- Location: Thorncombe, Dorset, England
- Coordinates: 50°50′27″N 2°54′36″W
- Completed: 12th century

Website
- Forde Abbey House & Gardens

Listed Building – Grade I
- Designated: 4 December 1951
- Reference no.: 1153362

Forde Abbey is a privately owned former Cistercian monastery in Dorset, England. The house and gardens are run as a tourist attraction while the 1,600-acre (650 ha) estate is farmed to provide additional revenue. Forde Abbey is a grade I listed building.

== History ==
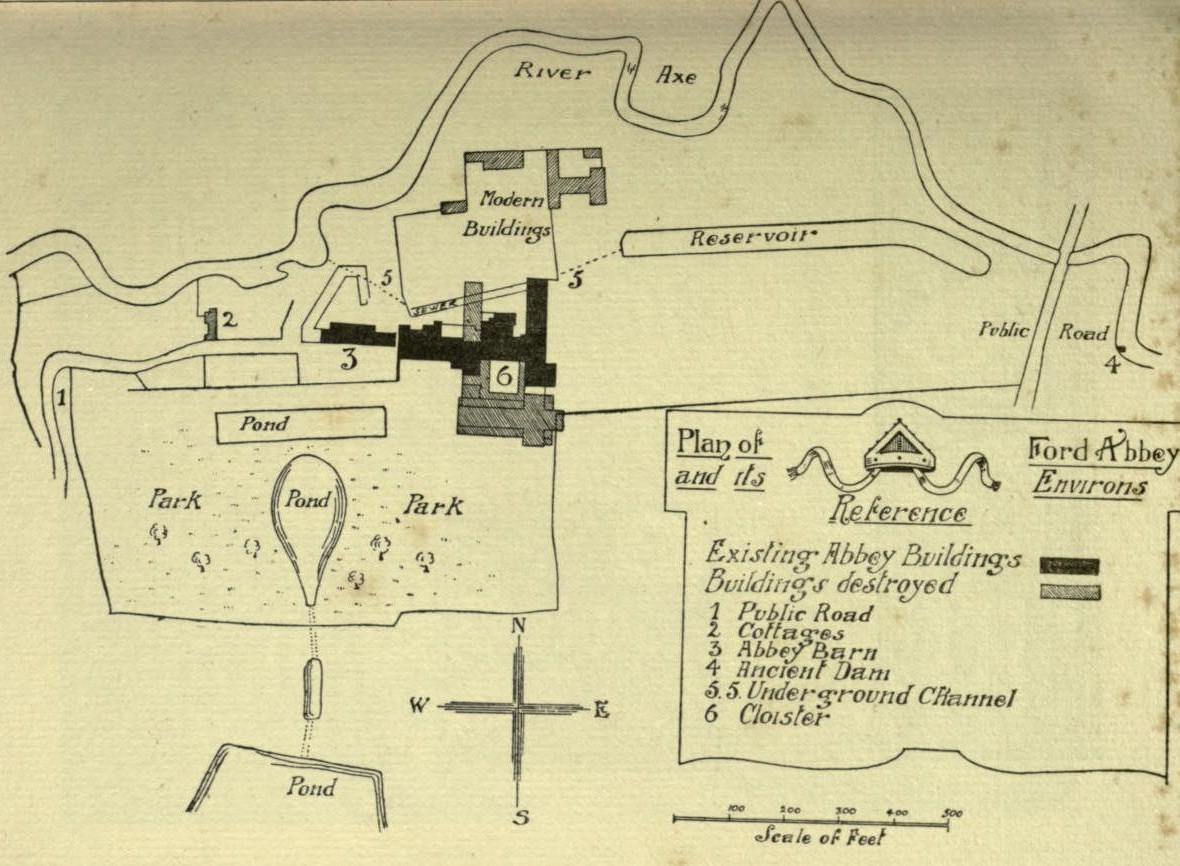
Plan of the Abbey and its surroundings (1911)

Between 1133 and 1136, wealthy nobleman Richard de Brioniis built a priory on his land at Brightley (meaning "bright" or "clear" pasture) and invited Gilbert, Abbot of Waverley in Surrey, to send 12 monks to form a new Cistercian community there. One story is that the agricultural land surrounding the new priory was insufficiently fertile, forcing the monks to consider returning to the mother house in 1141. However, Adelicia de Brioniis, the sister of Richard and successor to his estate, offered them an alternative site close to the River Axe in the manor of Thorncombe. Here, between 1141 and 1148, they built a new priory which came to be known as "Ford" due to its proximity to an old river crossing. The monastery was dedicated to the Virgin Mary.

John of Ford (c. 1140 – 21 April 1214) was the prior of Forde Abbey, then from 1186 abbot of its daughter house of Bindon, and between 1191 and 1214 the abbot of Forde. He was a friend and ally of King John during the papal interdict, receiving remuneration from the king. The foundation grew and became very wealthy, eventually possessing lands over 30,000 acres (120 km^{2}) by the 14th century. Sometime in the 13th Century, the body of St. Wulfric of Haselbury was buried in the western transept of the abbey's church, after an attempt by Benedictine monks from Montacute Priory to steal the body of the saint. The third abbot, Abbot Baldwin, became Archbishop of Canterbury. Abbot Chard, the last abbot of Forde at the time of the dissolution of the monasteries, surrendered the abbey to the Crown peacefully in 1539. The abbey buildings and lands were leased in 1540 to Richard Pollard (1505-1542), second son of Sir Lewis Pollard (c.1465-1526) of King's Nympton, Devon, Justice of the Common Pleas from 1514 to 1526

Richard Pollard was later knighted and his son sold Forde Abbey to his relative, Sir Amias Poulet of Hinton St George, Somerset. Sir Amias and his father before him had acted as Steward of the Abbey and its property while it was a monastery. In 1580–81, Sir Amias Poulet was licensed to alienate lands belonging to that abbey to William Rosewell, the 20-year-old son of William Rosewell, Solicitor-General. Forde Abbey probably changed hands about the same time. William Rosewell of Forde died in 1593 and Forde Abbey was left to his wife Anne. Their son Henry probably took ownership on maturity in 1611. Henry became Sir Henry Rosewell of Forde in 1619. Forde Abbey was held for nearly seventy years by the Rosewells until it was sold in 1649 to Edmund Prideaux (died 1659), Member of Parliament for Lyme Regis and Treasurer of the Inner Temple, London. He supported the Parliamentary cause during the English Civil War and was the attorney-general for most of the Interregnum. He made a fortune practising law and running the Parliamentary postal service. Having purchased the property he converted the buildings into his private home, with several classicising features, including the small loggia.

The house remained largely unchanged during the 18th century, though the gardens were created during this period. In 1815, the house was rented to the philosopher Jeremy Bentham. During the 19th century the house had a succession of owners, some of whom neglected the house while others attempted to renovate it. In 1905, the cousin of the last owner inherited the house and moved in with her husband Freeman Roper, whose descendants still own and occupy the house and estates. Following the death of her father Mark Roper, the most recent owner (as of 2026) is Alice Kennard.

== House and gardens ==
Much of the original monastery, including the abbey church was demolished in the period after the dissolution; only two statues, now on display in the Great Hall, have been found from the original church. The monastic parts of the current house are the great hall, the north side of the original square of the cloisters as well as the monks' accommodation, the upper refectory and the undercroft, which was the abbey's working area, and the chapter house, which has been converted into a chapel. Other rooms have been subsequently converted into State Rooms and show no evidence of their earlier use. Prideaux added some bedrooms and a reception area in the front of the building as part of his conversion of the abbey to a private house.

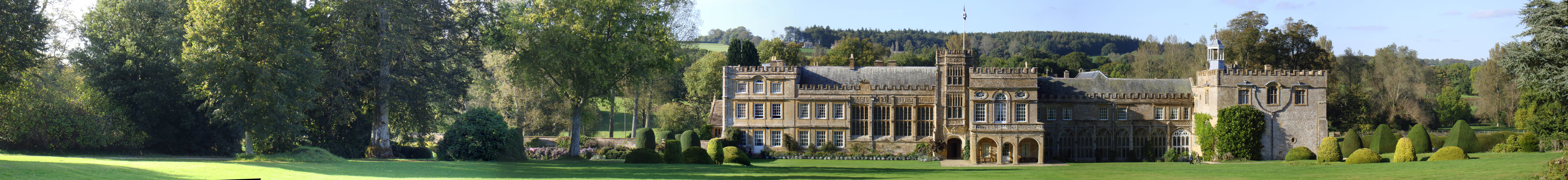
Forde Abbey panorama

The gardens of Forde Abbey are one of the main attractions. They are listed as grade II* in the National Heritage List for England as a "historically important garden". The Roper family has maintained and improved the gardens during their tenure. The gardens cover 30 acres (120,000 m^{2}) including several water features, planted gardens and an arboretum. The lawns were laid out in front of the house in the 18th century and many of the trees were planted in the 19th century.

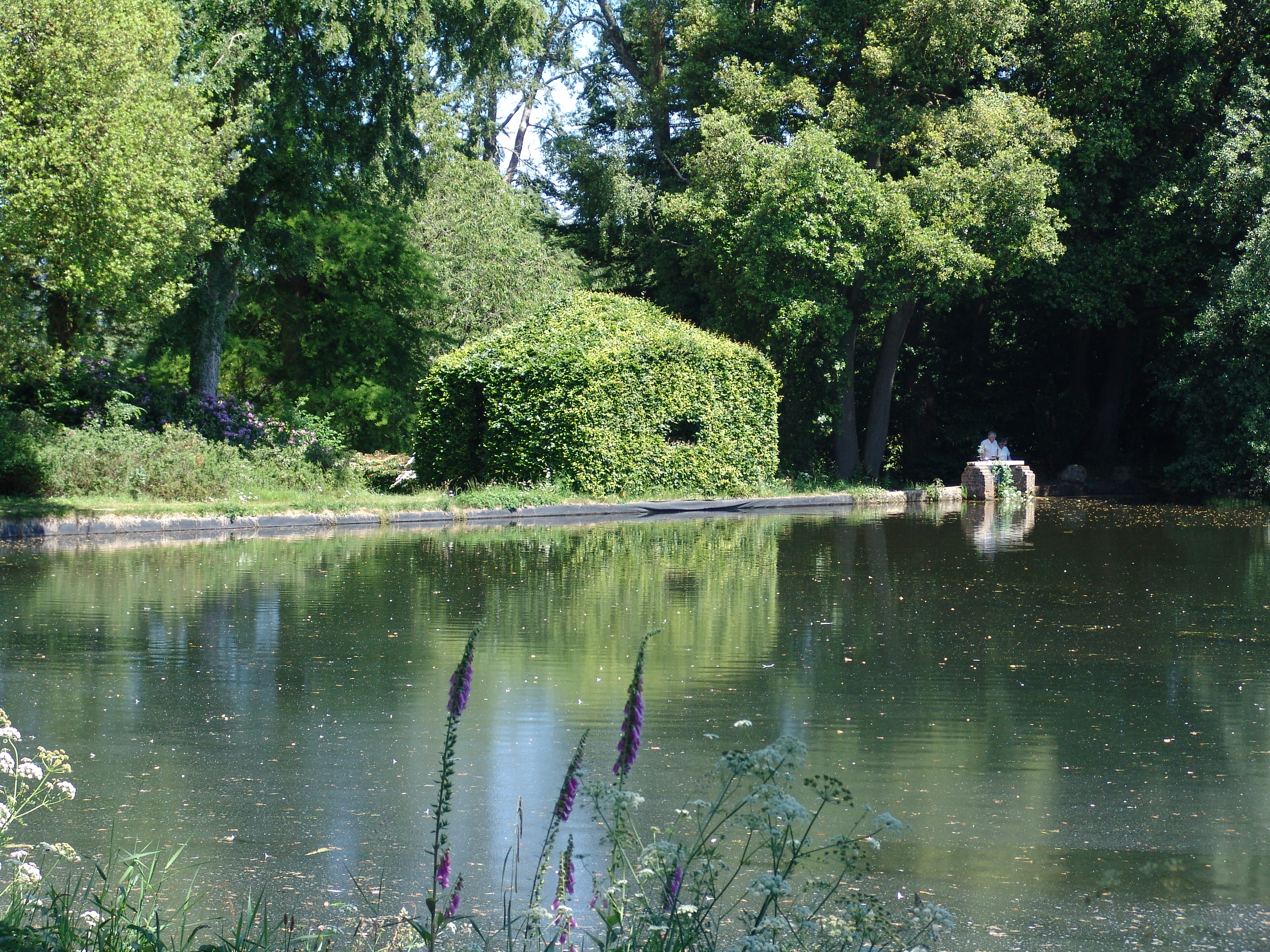
Beech House by the Great Pond

The Great Pond, which was originally the head pond for a watermill, feeds a series of cascades down the hill to three smaller ponds which were a part of the gardens laid down in the 18th century. On the edge of the Great Pond is the Beech House, a structure formed from beech hedges which was created in the 1930s to provide a bird watching hide overlooking the pond. There is also a bog garden by the pond.

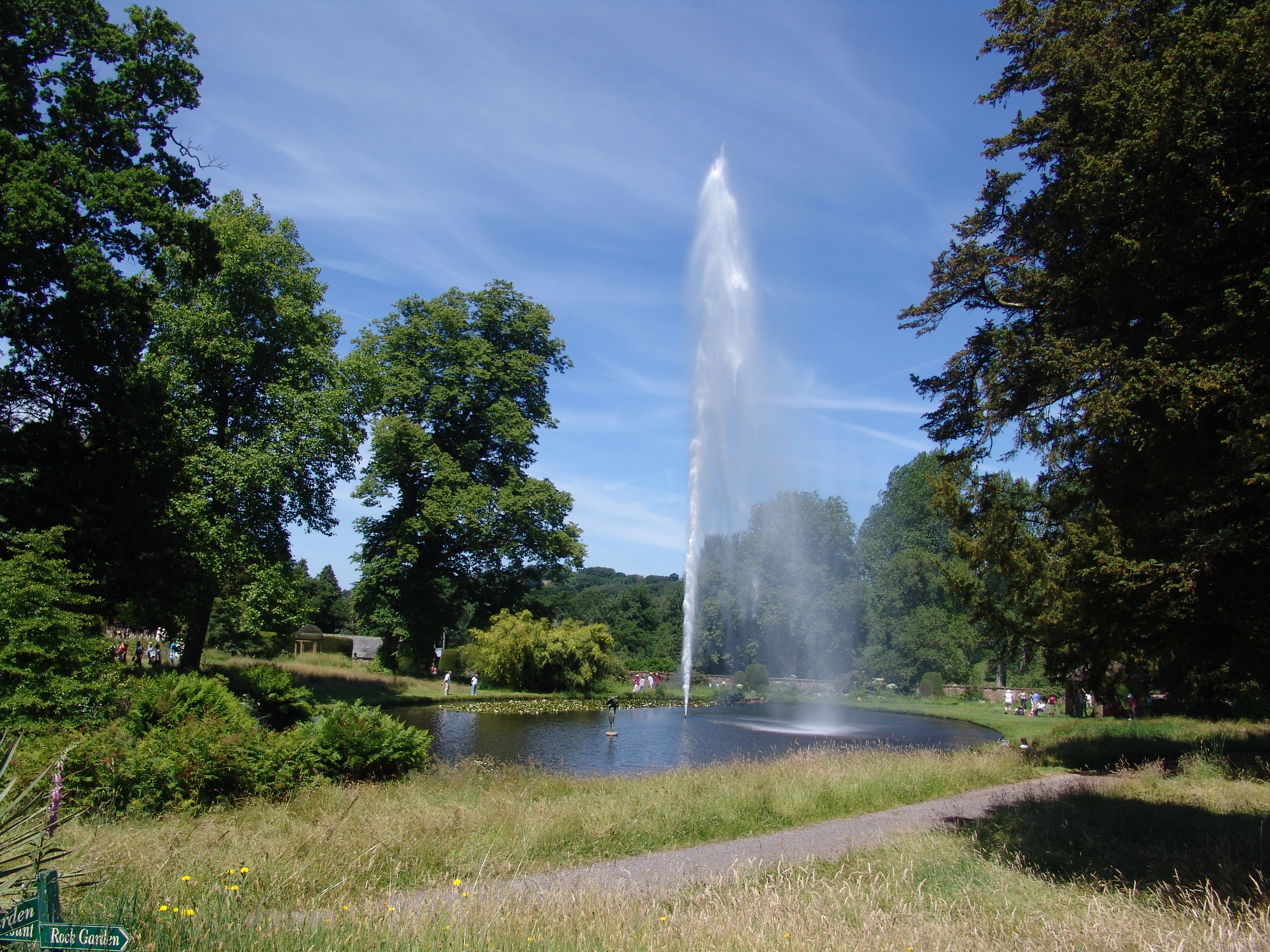
Centenary Fountain

In the second largest pond, the Mermaid pond, the Roper family installed the Centenary Fountain in 2005 to commemorate the centenary of their ownership of Forde Abbey. At 160 feet (49 m) in height, it is claimed to be the highest powered fountain in England. Closer to the house surrounding the Long pond, there is extensive planting of flowering plants which provide a colourful sight in the summer months.

Behind the house, there is a Victorian walled kitchen garden which originally supplied the house with food but is now mostly used as a nursery to provide plants for sale to the visitors.

== Other burials at Forde Abbey ==
- Renaud de Courtenay
- Edward de Courtenay, 3rd Earl of Devon
- Hugh Courtenay (KG)
