= Benjamin Rosewell (shipwright) =

Benjamin Rosewell (c. 1665-1737) was a master shipwright at Harwich, Plymouth, Chatham and Sheerness Naval Dockyards, and Governor of Hawkins Hospital, Chatham.

== Family ==
Benjamin was the son of John Rosewell (1643-1692), Gentleman of Chatham, Kent and grandson of Reverend Walter Rosewell (c. 1610-1658), Presbyterian minister of Chatham. Benjamin married Elizabeth Wyborne on 11 September 1684 at Saint Katherine's by the Tower, London. Their children included: John (1689-1711); Jeremiah (1697-1741); Benjamin (d. 1727); William (d. 1726); Edward (1698-1727); Elizabeth (1700-1775); and Sarah (d. 1743).

- John died at the age of 22 and was buried at Chatham on 8 November 1711.
- Jeremiah married Rebecca Ford on 19 September 1724 at Deptford, Kent. He was Master Shipwright at Sheerness Dockyard (1732-1741); Beadle of the Manor at Chatham in 1738; and launched Rupert, a 60 gun Ship of the Line, on 27 Oct 1740. He died at Sheerness and was buried at Chatham on 19 January 1741. He named Curtis Barnett and George Musgrave as executors in his 1739 will which was proved 11 August 1742. On 9 November 1749 administration of the estate was granted to Richard Rosewell, son of Jeremiah, as Curtis Barnett was deceased.
- Benjamin was purser on HMS Lyon(Lion) when he wrote his will in 1726. His executor was Curtis Barnett and his will was proved 16 Nov 1727.
- William married Elizabeth Lake on 23 January 1711 at Chatham. He was appointed Master Shipwright at Plymouth Dockyard in December 1722 but died in November 1726 and was buried at Devonport, Devon. He was survived by his wife and six children:

Benjamin Rosewell (1714-1782), Attorney of Throgmorton Street and Clapton, London;
Rear Admiral (Note: Henry Rosewell was named as 'Rear Admiral Henry Rosewell' by his widow, Fanney Rosewell in her will of 1803.) Henry Rosewell (1716-1782 (Note: In his will of 21 April 1782, his brother Benjamin 'forgives that which he now owes me'. So he was alive then.)), former Commanding Officer of HMS Lively and HMS Medway;
John Rosewell (c. 1722-1755), Inspector of Building at Hull Dockyard (1740-1741) and Master Caulker at Chatham;
Mary married to Hezikiah Hargood in 1740, Clerk of the Survey, Royal Dockyard, Chatham. Parents of Sir William Hargood;
Elizabeth married to Thomas Hargood in 1742, Surgeon of Chatham;
Susannah married to Flower Freeman, merchant of Whitechapel.

Benjamin Rosewell, William's father, made detailed provisions for the children of his deceased son in his will of 1731.

- Edward was sent to Madras, India as a Factor (agent) for the British East India Company and died there on 12 April 1727.
- Elizabeth married Commodore Curtis Barnett (1696-1746) on 13 May 1725 at St Paul's Cathedral, London.
- Sarah (name recorded as Rosell) married (1) Lieutenant Young and (2) George Musgrave, storekeeper of the ordinance at Chatham and sixth son of Sir Christopher Musgrave, fourth Baronet, by his second wife Elizabeth Franklyn.

== Career ==
Benjamin Rosewell was apprenticed to Phineas Pett about 1683 at Chatham Dockyard. Pett was the 1st Assistant Master Shipwright and the son of Sir Phineas Pett First Resident Commissioner of Chatham Dockyard. Rosewell held the office of Purveyor (Note: The function of this officer was the selection and provision of timber, principally oak and elm, for the building of ships.) at Chatham from 1689 to 1695. He was appointed 2nd Assistant Master Shipwright in 1695 and 1st Assistant Master Shipwright in 1699 at Chatham.

The following is a summary of his career as a ship builder:
1695 Appointed 2nd Assistant Master Shipwright at Chatham Dockyard
1699 Appointed 1st Assistant Master Shipwright at Chatham Dockyard

- 1699 Launched Stirling Castle (Note: Wrecked in 1703.)

1702 Appointed Master Shipwright at Harwich Dockyard
1702 Appointed Master Shipwright at Plymouth Dockyard

- 1703 Launched Rupert
- 1704 Launched Plymouth

1705 Appointed Master Shipwright at Chatham Dockyard

- 1705 Launched Stirling Castle
- 1706 Launched London
- 1707 Launched Salisbury
- 1707 Designed Mermaid
- 1707 Launched Mermaid
- 1708 Launched Chester
- 1709 Launched Lion
- 1710 Launched Vanguard
- 1711 Launched Bonaventure
- 1712 Launched Rose
- 1715 Launched Sandwich
- 1717 Launched Newark
- 1718 Launched Norwich
- 1719 Launched Swallow
- 1721 Designed London
- 1721 Launched London
- 1721 Launched Colchester
- 1721 Designed Hawke
- 1721 Launched Hawke
- 1722 Launched Plymouth
- 1723 Launched Lenox
- 1724 Launched Sunderland
- 1725 Launched Supply
- 1726 Launched Union

1727 Appointed Master Shipwright at Chatham Dockyard. Renewed warrant.

- 1727 Launched Rye
- 1729 Launched Royal Sovereign
- 1732 Designed Spy
- 1732 Launched Spy

1732 Appointed Master Shipwright at Sheerness Dockyard.
1732? Superannuated with a pension of £100 a year.

- 1737 Launched Gloucester

Governor of Hawkins Hospital
Benjamin Rosewell is recorded as a Governor of Hawkins Hospital at Chatham in 1726 and 1734.

== Death ==
Benjamin Rosewell died and was buried at St Marys, Chatham on 4 December 1737, presumably in the family vault. His will, written on 8 September 1731, with codicil written 5 October 1731, was proved 10 January 1738. The executors were Jeremiah Rosewell and George Musgrave. His wife, Elizabeth, was buried at Chatham on 14 February 1730.
