= Benjamin Rosewell (attorney) =

British Attorney

Benjamin Rosewell (1714 – 1782) was an attorney at Angel Court, Throgmorton Street, London.

== Family ==
Benjamin Rosewell was born in 1714 at Chatham, Kent, the son of William Rosewell (c. 1692 – 1726), master shipwright of Plymouth, and his wife Elizabeth. William had died at the age of about 34 years, leaving Elizabeth to care for their six children but with financial support from William’s father, Benjamin Rosewell (c. 1665 – 1737), master shipwright of Chatham Dockyard.

Benjamin married Anne Colthurst on 10 January 1744 at St James Garlickhithe, London. They had nine children, of which only one son and three daughters survived them. The children were:

- William Rosewell (born 1744). Known as "Billy". Admitted to the Middle Temple in 1769. Dead by 1782, leaving one natural-born daughter.
- Benjamin Rosewell (born 1745). Referred to as ‘my unhappy son’ in his father’s will.
- John Rosewell (1746–1779). Civil Service writer for the East India Company. Died in Calcutta leaving one natural born son, Hugh Alexander Rosewell (1777–1799).
- Charles Rosewell (born 1747). Dead by 1782.
- Ann Rosewell (1748–1797). Married John Downe Alleyne (1748–1777). Ann Alleyne was interred in the family vault at St Marys, Chatham, on 26 April 1797.
- Elizabeth Rosewell (born 1749). Spinster in 1782.
- Henry Rosewell (born 1750). Dead by 1782 leaving one natural born son.
- Hezikiah Rosewell (born 1752). Dead by 1782.
- Martha Rosewell (born 1756). Married Lieutenant Robert Parker (died 1798) on 19 February 1778 at Chatham.

== Career and associates ==
To comply with the Attorneys and Solicitors Act 1728, Benjamin Rosewell would have completed his “articles” with at least a five-year apprenticeship to a senior attorney. By 1740 he was practicing as an attorney at Ironmonger Street, London. He took on many apprentices over the ensuing years with records showing him at Bassinghall Street (1744–1748) and Throgmorton Street in 1769. In London Directories for the years 1763 to 1777 he is listed as attorney of 12 Angel Court, Throgmorton Street. From 1778 to 1781 he is listed as Rosewell and Dawes, attorneys, of 12 Angel Court. When he wrote his will in 1782 he described himself as ‘Gentleman of Throgmorton Street and of Clapton in Hackney, Middlesex’ and referred to servants at each location. It is presumed that he resided at Clapton and practiced as an attorney from 12 Angel Court, Throgmorton Street, London.

One who joined the practice as an articled clerk was Weeden Butler (1742–1823) who was there from 24 December 1757 for a term of six years. When the term expired, Rosewell offered him a partnership. However, Butler declined as he had decided to take holy orders. They remained good friends.

Another was John Alleyne (1748–1777) who was born in Barbados, educated at Eton College and was articled in 1763. John and Weeden Butler were there at the same time and became close friends. John Alleyne was admitted student of the Middle Temple in 1767, shortly before “Billy” Rosewell, and barrister in 1772. He married Ann Rosewell on 29 May 1768 at St John, Hackney, London. They had four daughters living in 1782.

John Alleyne was a frequent and descriptive letter writer and some of his correspondence with Reverend Weeden Butler and Benjamin Franklin (1706–1790), one of the Founding Fathers of the United States, has been published. Franklin was an intimate friend and mentor to John. With both correspondents John Alleyne refers to his wife as Nancy, this being a diminutive form of Ann.

Benjamin Rosewell's practice partner at the time of his death was Edwin Dawes, who was possibly a nephew of Weeden Butler. The house at Angel Court became the office of Messrs. Dawes and Chatfield, Solicitors.

== Death ==
Benjamin Rosewell made his will on 21 April 1782, in which he provided for his living children and grandchildren, including those natural born. He desired to be buried ‘in my own family vault at Chatham, Kent’. He expressed much disappointment and frustration with the behaviour of 'my unhappy son Benjamin' and seemed to blame the circumstances on ‘this vile town’.

He died on 1 June 1782 and was buried in the vault of Reverend Walter Rosewell, his second great grandfather, in the churchyard of St Marys, Chatham, on 10 June 1782.

Administration was granted 18 June 1782 on the oaths of Ann Alleyne Widow and Elizabeth Rosewell Spinster, 'executors as long as they remain single and unmarried', and the other executors Reverend Weeden Butler and Edwin Dawes.
