= HMS Rye (1727) =

History

Great Britain
- Name: HMS Rye
- Ordered: 11 May 1727
- Builder: Royal Dockyard, Chatham
- Launched: 6 October 1727
- Commissioned: November 1727
- Fate: Broken up at Sheerness, December 1735

General characteristics
- Type: 20-gun Sixth Rate
- Tons burthen: 371 45/94 bm
- Length: 106 ft 0 in (32.3 m) gundeck; 87 ft 9 in (26.7 m) keel for tonnage
- Beam: 28 ft 4 in (8.6 m) for tonnage
- Depth of hold: 9 ft 2 in (2.8 m)
- Sail plan: ship-rigged
- Armament: 20 × 6-pdr 19 cwt guns on wooden trucks (UD)

HMS Rye was a member of the 1719 Establishment Group of 20-gun sixth rates. After commissioning she spent her career in Home waters on trade protection duties. She was broken up in 1735.

Rye was the second named vessel since it was used for a 32-gun fifth ratelaunched at Sheerness in 1696, rebuilt in 1717 as a 24-gun sixth rateused as a breakwater from 1727 and broken in December 1727.

== Construction ==
She was ordered on 11 May 1727 from Chatham Dockyard to be built under the guidance of Benjamin Rosewell, Master Shipwright of Chatham. She was launched on 6 October 1727. She was completed on 7 February 1728 at a cost of 4,724.16.6d. (Note: A total cost accounting for inflation of approximately £832,800 in today's money.) She was surveyed on 13 November 1724.

== Commissioned service ==
She was commissioned in November 1727 under the command of Captain John Edwards, RN for service in Home Waters then on to Jamaica in 1731. With the death of Captain Edwards on 28 August 1731, Captain William Swale, RN took over becoming the Flagship of Rear-Admiral Charles Stewart. Her hull was sheathed with Doctor Hardisway's composition ('graved black') at Sheerness in November 1732.

== Disposition ==
HMS Rye was broken up at Sheerness in December 1735.
