= William Rosewell (apothecary) =

London apothecary (c.1606 – c.1680)

Major William Rosewell (c.1606 – c.1680) (also Rowswell or Rousewell), was a London apothecary, a Royalist soldier, apothecary to Queen Catherine (wife of Charles II), and Master of the Worshipful Company of Apothecaries (1661–62).

== Family ==
William Rosewell is identified as 'Somerset born' and of 'North Curry, Somerset'. He commenced his apprenticeship in 1620 at about 14 years of age so was born about 1606. (Note: He was possibly a son of William Rowswell and Agnes Norton of North Curry who were married in 1595.)

Sometime before 1638, William married Phillipa Phillips (died 1705) the youngest daughter of Francis Phillips of London (one of the Auditors of the Royal Exchequer) and sister of Francis Phillips (died 1674), of the Inner Temple and of Sunbury Manor, Sunbury, Middlesex (now Surrey). William and Phillipa had two sons, William (1638–1692) and Edward (1641- dead by 1679), who were both admitted to William Dugard's private school in 1650. Dugard had been temporarily suspended as headmaster of the Merchant Taylor's School. William Rosewell junior went on to St Paul's School and to Wadham College, Oxford, in 1656 as a Pauline Exhibitor. He graduated B.A. 1660, M.A. 1663 and D.Med Lambeth 1675.

William Rosewell M.D. had a practice at Guildford, Surrey. He married Jane Davies and they had two children: William (c.1662–1693) buried at Sunbury; and Edward (c.1664–1702) buried at Guildford. William Rosewell was the mayor of Guildford in 1686.

== Career ==
William Rosewell was apprenticed to Richard Moy in 1620 and was examined in 1628 by the Apothecaries' Company. They made him 'free' (freeman of the Company) and he presented them with the traditional silver spoon. He began his career as personal attendant to Richard Neile, Bishop of Winchester (1628–31) and later Archbishop of York (1631–40), a close associate of William Laud in the Star Chamber and elsewhere. Charles I sent a letter to the Governors of St Thomas's Hospital in 1639 asking for the reversion of the post of Apothecary for William Rosewell. The letter was in response to a recommendation to the King by Archbishop Neile. The Governors postponed a decision until 1640 when they granted a qualified reversion. However, when Roger Young, the holder, retired in 1655, William, as a Royalist, was passed over.

He risked his life in his service to the Stuarts and it cost him his estates in North Curry.

=== Soldier ===
William Rosewell was commissioned in 1643 as a Captain in Sir Marmaduke Rawdon's Regiment of Foot (also known as 'The London Regiment'). William was serving with the London Trained Bands and probably was encouraged to join the Regiment by Thomas Johnson, a leading apothecary of the time and also a Captain in the Regiment. Johnson had been made freeman of the Company in the same year as William.

In October 1643 the Regiment was engaged in the defence and ensuing siege of Basing House, Hampshire, by the Parliamentarians. Captain Rosewell frequently led troops into the surrounding villages to collect supplies for the occupants who were often close to starvation. On such a mission in July 1664 he was captured and then imprisoned in Farnham Castle where he fared badly being confined 'in so noysome a hole, as 'tis not conceivable how a man should breathe in it above two houres'. He was released in an exchange of prisoners in September and within a few days was promoted to Major.

Sir Marmaduke Rawdon and his regiment marched out of Basing House in May 1645 and eventually took up positions in Faringdon, Berkshire (now Oxfordshire) where they were soon again under siege. Major Rosewell received an injury to his thigh in early 1646 when leading an attack against occupying forces. He led the defence of Faringdon until the surrender of 24 June 1646.

During the 1650s William Rosewell was reappointed an officer of the London Trained Bands, living on his pay and possibly acting as a Royalist spy. In 1662 he commanded a body of Trained Bandsmen that broke up a Quaker meeting and imprisoned thirty of the worshipers. He was later Lieutenant Colonel of the Yellow Regiment of the Trained Bands and a Justice of the Peace.

His estates at North Curry had been sequestered (confiscated) as he 'Bore arms against Parliament'. He paid a fine in 1646 to have them restored. However, in 1647 he lodged a complaint with the Committee for Compounding with Delinquents that a Thomas Rosewell, who had held the estate during sequestration, had refused to give up possession of 3 acres in Haskin (Haskey) Moor, (North Curry), Somerset. The Committee decided to take no further action in 1648.

=== Apothecary ===
At the Restoration in 1660, William Rosewell secured his claim to the St. Thomas's hospital post and sought to resume his profession as an Apothecary.

At a company meeting 'held on 23 February 1660–61, Major Rousewell, a royalist and once an Apothecary, but had declined to become an assistant in those p'illous tymes or to putt himself forward in the Companies busnies offered now to resume his connection therewith.' His offer was accepted on payment of a fine. 'Two months later the King sent a letter to the company containing a request that this Major Rowswell should be elected Master. This letter stated that his nominee had been a Major and was a member of the Company. He had lost everything in the service of the King and his father (Charles), and was now merely an officer in the trained bands. The King recommends him to the Company as Master without holding any other office or paying any fine.'

William Rosewell was elected as Master of the Worshipful Company of Apothecaries in August 1661 and held the position for the one-year term. He is described as a 'remarkable man upon whose judgement in difficult negotiations the Company had come to rely with increasing confidence'. 'Rousewell turned out as good an official as the Company had ever possessed.'

The difficult negotiations were between the College of Physicians and the Apothecaries. 'The Physicians, envious of the Apothecaries' success, in their dejection attributed the poverty which had fallen upon them to the invasion of their monopoly of practice by apothecary empirics, who diverted to themselves the fees which by rights they alone should have earned.' 'Rosewell zealously represented the apothecaries' best interests for many years in their ongoing struggle with the College of Physicians.' The Company was assisted in drafting an Act of Parliament to confirm the status of Apothecaries by William Rosewell's brother-in-law, Francis Phillips.

=== Apothecary to the Queen ===
It appears that William paid his own way to Portugal in early 1662 to attend Catherine of Braganza before her marriage to Charles II. He became Queen Catherine's personal 'druggist' after her marriage to Charles in May 1662. William was reimbursed by the Treasury in 1664 for his services in Portugal but future payments had to come from the Queen's allowance. Unfortunately, the Queen was no better at paying her servants than was the King as William had to again seek funding from the Treasury for the perfumes he had made for Catherine's private chapel.

Despite his financial worries with the Queen, his new medical and professional positions and other remunerative civic posts, restored his personal fortune.

== Death ==
William Rosewell is reported to have died in the 1680s but no specific date of death or burial has been found. The last reference to him was to a deed of settlement made 10 February 1679 by which 'William Rosewell, of Bloomsbury, conveys the leases of a house in the new street called Southampton Street and of eight tenements in Paternoster Row, to Sir Rob. Sawyer (Note: Sir Robert Sawyer, Phillipa Rosewell's first cousin.) and others, in trust for his wife Philippa after his death, his grandchildren William and Edward Rosewell, and his son William Rosewell, M.D.; with several contingent remainders.'

However, his place of burial and that of his wife and eldest son is known: ‘A note of the graves in the chancel and church of Sunbury as far as I am aware taken 7 March 1692. In the middle of the chancel: Dr Wm Rosewell of Guildford; In ye south side Col Wm Rosewell of London ye Queen’s Apothecary and ye Dr’s father’. In her will written in 1700, Phillipa Rosewell directs that her body be buried in Sunbury Church in the same grave as her late husband.
