= Samuel Rosewell =

The Reverend Samuel Rosewell M. A.
- engraved by Van den Bergh
- Born: 1679; Rotherhithe, Surrey
- Died: April 7, 1722; Hackney
- Resting place: Bunhill Fields
- Occupation: Minister of religion

Reverend Samuel Rosewell (1679 – 7 April 1722) was a Presbyterian minister born in Rotherhithe, Surrey.

== Early years and education ==
Samuel was the eldest son of Reverend Thomas Rosewell (1630–1692) and his second wife, Anne Godsalve (née Wanley). He was only 12 years old when his father died. He was a scholar at St Paul's School, London and is said to have graduated M.A. from a Scottish University.

== Marriages ==
He married (1) Rebekah Russell (d. in or before 1713) at St Katharine's by the Tower in 1709. They had one son, Richard, who died before 1721. He married (2) Lettice Barrett (c. 1687–1762) and had a son and two daughters: Thomas, Sussannah and Lettice who were all in their minorities in 1721. Sussannah married Henry Girle in 1747 and had one son, Reverend Samuel Girle (1757–1813), a Presbyterian/Unitarian minister.

== Ministries ==
Samuel Rosewell was chosen about 1701 as assistant to William Harris (c. 1675–1740) at Poor Jewry Presbyterian church and continued there until invited in 1705 to assist John Howe (1630–1705) at the Silver Street meeting, Cheapside. He continued after Howe's death as assistant to Howe's successor, John Spademan. He was ordained by Spademan on 2 August 1705 before a large congregation. At this time he lectured at the Old Jewry on Sunday evenings alternatively with Benjamin Grosvenor. He was the sole lecturer when the lecture was moved to Founder's Hall, Lothbury, in 1713. He resigned his preferment from ill health in October 1719 and moved to Mare Street, Hackney.

== Works ==
Samuel was very popular especially with the younger congregations. He was described as follows:

'Mr. Rosewell was a minister of considerable abilities, a serious preacher, and for some years very much followed. His performances were accurate, judicious, and lively; fitted to inform and instruct the mind, as well as to engage the affections; and to promote a serious attention to the concerns of religion. And the fruit of his ministry was very considerable both in his own congregation, and at a lecture which he preached for a considerable number of years to young persons. In the several relations of private life, as a son, a husband, a father, and a friend, he was an ornament to his character, and discovered the prevailing influence of religious principles.'

He was the author of more than twenty works, the majority being sermons on practical and devotional subjects, but including:

Seasonable Instructions for the Afflicted, London, 1711.
The Protestant Dissenters' Hopes from the present Government freely declared, London, 1716.
The Life and Death of Mr. T. Rosewell, London, 1718. This is generally prefixed to the account of the trial of the latter.

He was responsible for completing St. Paul's Epistle to the Ephesians in Matthew Henry's biblical 'Commentary' after Henry's death.

== Portraits ==
A portrait engraved by Van den Bergh is printed in the May 1794 issue of the Protestant Dissenters' Magazine. Another was engraved in 1707 by John Faber (1660–1721) after John Wollaston (c. 1672–1749), portrait painter. A print by J Lawrence is located at the British Museum.

== Death ==
Samuel died at Hackney, after a tedious illness, on 7 April 1722. His demeanor on his deathbed excited the admiration of his friend Isaac Watts. He was buried in Bunhill Fields, London, near his father's grave. The funeral sermon was preached by Jeremiah Smith.

His grave was situated between the grave of Thomas Rosewell and the obelisk for Daniel Defoe, which are both still there. However, the area was bombed during World War II and the intervening graves destroyed. The area has been paved over.

The headstone was inscribed as follows:
In Memory of
SAMUEL ROSEWELL
Minister of the Gospel,
Whose zeal and labour of God,
Whose charity and love of men,
Whose courage and patience under long and acute pains,
And whose joyful hope and triumph in death,
Gave the world a glorious example of Christianity.
Born 1679. Died in the year 1722, aged 42.

== Will ==
Samuel Rosewell wrote his will at Hackney on 28 February 1721. Probate was granted at London on 2 May 1722. His wife, mother, sisters, and children were all named as beneficiaries. In a note to his will he expressed his regret that, due to his long and expensive illness, he could not do more for his family and friends.
