= Walter Rosewell =

Reverend Walter Rosewell (c. 1610 – 20 May 1658) was the Vicar of Doulting, Somerset and later became a Presbyterian Minister at Chatham, Kent. He was sequestered and imprisoned in 1649 for refusing to take the oath of Engagement and for sedition.

== Early years and education ==
Walter Rosewell was born about 1610 probably at Doulting, Somerset. He was a son of Reverend John Rosewell (1579-1639) the Vicar of Doulting from 1610 to 1639. John Rosewell possibly married Sarah Chapman at Claverton, Somerset in 1604. Walter was a brother to William Rosewell (d. 1649) of Empingham, Rutland and Anthony (b. 1615). Walter graduated B.A. from Queen's College, Oxford in 1629; M. A. in 1632; and was incorporated at Cambridge 1633.

== Family ==
Walter was a great grandson of William Rosewell (1499–1568) and a grandson of Thomas Rosewell (1533–c. 1602) both of Dunkerton, Somerset. His Uncles were William Rosewell (c. 1561–c. 1620) of the Middle Temple and Reverend Alexander Rosewell (1567-1616) of Combe Hay, Somerset. He was a first cousin of Thomas Rosewell, Nonconformist Minister of Rotherhithe, Surrey.

He married Susannah (d. 1691) about 1639. They had two sons at Oxford University: John Rosewell (1643-1692) matriculated at Lincoln College in 1661, aged 18; and Daniel Rosewell (1651-1693) matriculated at Corpus Christi in 1668, aged 17, and graduated B.A. from Wadham 1674. Other known children were Susannah (b. 1640), Mary (b. 1644) and Joseph (1645-1654).

In 1664 John, first son of Walter, was apprenticed to John Lee of the Fishmongers Company, London. He married Ruth Smyth (Smith) in 1678 and by 1687 he was recorded as John Rosewell, Gentleman, and lessee of 20 acres of land called Smithfield, at Chatham with Ruth Rosewell taking over the lease after John died. John had one son, Joseph (d. after 1711), who was apprenticed to the Currier Company in 1698 and a son by a possible previous marriage, Benjamin Rosewell (Note: Benjamin Rosewell's grandson, Benjamin Rosewell (c. 1720-1782), Attorney of Throgmorton St., and Clapton, London, was interred in the family vault at St Marys, Chatham. No earlier marriage of John Rosewell or baptism of Benjamin Rosewell (Shipwright) has yet been found.) (c. 1665-1737), who was apprenticed at Chatham Naval Dockyards in 1683.

Benjamin Rosewell was appointed Master Shipwright of Harwich Dockyard in 1702; Plymouth also in 1702; Chatham in 1705 and of Sheerness in 1732. In the period 1699 to 1737 he launched/refitted 28 and designed 4 ships.

Daniel, second son, was licensed as a schoolmaster at Goudhurst, Kent in 1675. He married Frances Betts at Findsbury, Kent in October 1675 and they had three sons between 1676 and 1679. Frances died soon after the birth of their youngest son, Francis (1679-1749), and Daniel presumably moved back to Chatham to seek family support.

Francis Rosewell was a Master of Apprentices at Chatham Dockyard 1714-1743; Foreman Shipwright in 1745 and Shipwright at his death in 1749. His son, Walter Rosewell, was a Clerk at Chatham Dockyards in 1738.

== Career and Ministries ==
Walter Rosewell was appointed as Curate to Claverton, Somerset in 1630 and was ordained in 1632. In 1639 he was instituted as vicar of Doulting following the death of his father, Reverend John Rosewell. He was severely persecuted by Bishop Pierce of Bath & Wells and by 1640 he was Puritan minister at St Mathews Friday Street, Cheapside, London. In 1647 he replaced Ambrose Clare (curate) as the incumbent Presbyterian minister of St Marys, Chatham.

He arrived in Chatham at a time when there was considerable religious and political dissent amongst the parishioners and within the Dockyards. This dissent was inflamed when William Adderley was appointed the naval chaplain in 1649. Adderley was a political and religious Independent and opposed to Peter Pett the Commissioner of the Dockyard.

‘By 1650 the King had been executed, the monarchy abolished and the country was governed by Oliver Cromwell and the Council of State’. Walter Rosewell was prepared to use the pulpit to speak out in opposition to these changes. He also refused to take the oath of Engagement in February 1650, which was to swear allegiance to the new regime. Adderley had received a letter from Walter Rosewell apparently criticising the new order. He sent the letter to the Navy Commissioners who passed it on to the Committee for Plundered Ministers. In July 1650 Rosewell was charged with ‘refusing to take the Engagement and for bitter invecting against the proceedings of the Parliament and Army’. He was accused of ‘seditious practises against the State both in the pulpit and elsewhere...’ and was ‘sequestered from that [his] living by the Committee for Plundered Ministers, and by order of the Council committed to the Gatehouse, and prohibited from preaching any more at Chatham’.

The parish and dockyards were split into opposing camps with several dockyard officers taking Adderley's side against Rosewell, whilst others openly supported Rosewell. However, by 1653 most Chatham dockyard workers were keen to have Adderley removed as both sea chaplain and parish minister and in January 1654 the Council of State received a petition from ‘the officers and others relating to the navy, and inhabitants of the parish of Chatham’ to have their former minister, Walter Rosewell, reinstated, which they passed to the Admiralty. The Admiralty issued an order in February proposing that Rosewell and Adderley should jointly serve as parish ministers. This was accepted by both parties, however, Adderley was dismissed as sea chaplain in March 1654 and replaced by Laurence Wise.

‘Walter Rosewell took it upon himself to become the local defender of Presbyterianism and was often a lone voice against what he perceived were religious errors. He preached in the other local parish churches in the early 1650s whilst barred from preaching at Chatham and first encountered Richard Coppin, a Ranter, whilst preaching at Rochester in the late summer of 1655’. He realised the impact that Coppin had on his listeners both civil and military. ‘Coppins doctrines were so gross from Sabbath to Sabbath, that they were in the mouthes of many that heard him’. Rosewell challenged Coppin's erroneous religious views in a series of weekly lectures at Rochester Cathedral in October 1655. This culminated in the debates of December 1655 between Coppin and several local Presbyterian ministers. Coppin was served with a warrant forbidding him to preach and subsequently imprisoned as a Ranter. He defended himself by writing, from Maidstone Prison, a pamphlet A Blow at the Serpent. Walter Rosewell responded with his own publication The serpents subtilty discovered.

== Death ==
Walter Rosewell died in May 1658 and was buried in the churchyard near the south-west door of St Marys, Chatham on 20 May 1658. ‘His tomb bears a coat of arms, and the names of many descendants: the last being those of Benjamin Rosewell, of Clapton, Esq., and Ann Alleyne, his daughter, who died in 1782 and 1797, respectively’. The following Monumental Inscription was recorded by the Borough Surveyor in 1946: Walter Rosewell 16.5.1658 "Min. Parish of Chatham"; Susannah Rosewell 18.5.1691; Joseph; John; Daniel; Benjamin; Joan; Susannah; "Rest indecipherable". In 1986-1995 the Kent Family History Society recorded: "Vault covered in ivy".

Walter Rosewell was a man of considerable eminence. Thomas Case a London Presbyterian and close friend preached his funeral sermon, and afterwards published it. Case gives an insight into Walter Rosewell's character and his outspokenness. He noted ‘that the black adult humour of choler, held the predominancy in his individual Constitution, which many times gave a tincture to his discourse & action: and which standers-by, more censorious then candid, interpreted to his unjust prejudice’.

Many Chatham parishioners were aware of the hardships Rosewell had endured for his beliefs and were prepared to overlook his bluntness, as he did not direct his venom at the dockyard. Case spoke of there being ‘many living monuments of the power of God, in his Ministry’, referring to Rosewell's ability to draw men and convince them to his view. Case considered Rosewell a ‘faithful servant of Christ … no intruder, or up-start of the times, who like the false Prophets of old, run before they are sent, and speak a vision of their own heart, and not out of the mouth of the Lord’.

== Rosewells of the Royal Dockyards ==
None of Walter Rosewell's children were clerics. Instead they produced three generations of shipwrights and other professionals at various Royal Naval Dockyards:

- 1702 Benjamin Rosewell, Master Shipwright at Harwich and Plymouth; 1705 Chatham; 1732 Sheerness
- 1722 William Rosewell, Master Shipwright at Plymouth
- 1732 Jeremiah Rosewell, Master Shipwright at Sheerness
- 1738 Walter Rosewell, Clerk to Clerk of the Cheque at Chatham
- 1740 John Rosewell, Inspector of Building at Hull
- 1745 Francis Rosewell, Foreman Shipwright at Chatham
- 1786 Richard Rosewell, Clerk of the Cheque at Deptford

== Publications ==
Rosewell, Walter (1656). The serpents subtilty discovered, or a true relation of what passed in the cathedrall church of Rochester, between divers ministers and Richard Coppin : to prevent credulity to the false representation of the said discourse published by the said R. Coppin from Maidstone goale. Printed by A.M. for Jos. Cranford, at the Kings Head in St Pauls Church-yard.
