= William Rosewell (Solicitor-General) =

William Rosewell (c. 1520–1566) was the Solicitor-General to Queen Elizabeth between 1559 and 1566.

William Rosewell was born about 1520, the son of William Rosewell (Rowswell) (d. 1570) of Loxton, Somerset, England. He came to some prominence as Solicitor-General to Queen Elizabeth. He appears in the list of Queen's Counsel between 1558 and 1603 as W. Ruswell (or Mr. Russell) and was Solicitor-General from 1559 until his death in 1566. He was succeeded by Richard Onslow. He purchased a number of estates in Somerset and Devon.

== Family ==
About 1559 William Rosewell, the Solicitor-General, married Elizabeth, daughter of Matthew Dale, a wealthy haberdasher of Bristol and London. She was the widow of Gregory Isham, of Braunston, Northants who died in 1558. She is not mentioned in the Solicitor General's will, so it is assumed that she predeceased him. William and Elizabeth had three children – Parry (d. 1573), William (1561–1593), and Philippa. Parry died before he came of age. The second son, William, was born in 1561 and inherited from Parry in 1573. This William came into the possession of Forde Abbey, Devon in about 1581. He married Ann Walkeden in 1588 and had one child, Sir Henry Rosewell in 1590. William died at Ilminster, Somerset in 1593. Philippa married Sir George Speke of Whitelackington, Somerset in 1584.

== Career ==
William Rosewell was at the Middle Temple, London, in 1556 and was chosen as Assistant to the Reader of that institution in 1562. William Rosewell was appointed as Solicitor-General to Queen Elizabeth on 1 February 1559.

Only four items have been found relative to his action while in office. With the Attorney-General, Gerard, he signed a note, concerning grants of privileges to the University of Cambridge, about 1561; and in 1563 he made a note of the grant of the advowson of Northchurch. He was one of 13 noblemen and officers of the state appointed as mourners for the honourable celebration of the funeral of the Emperor in 1564. The Chamber Accounts of 1562–63 show that he received a reward of 40 shillings per year.

Despite a humble background, he was able to use his education to achieve high professional and social status. His marriage to the rich widow, Elizabeth Isham, may also have assisted him to acquire a large property portfolio, which in many instances he purchased from those who had obtained property following the dissolution of the monasteries.

== Landholdings ==
In 1556 Sir Thomas Smith, of Ankerwycke, in the county of Buckinghamshire (now Berkshire), sold the Manor and advowson of Yarlington, Somerset to William Rosewell, of Loxton, and William Rosewell, his son and heir of the Middle Temple, London for £1,000. A lease written in 1562 shows that William Rosewell, Solicitor-General, lived at the Yarlington Manor. The Solicitor-General died before his father who then left it to the third generation, William Rosewell of Forde Abbey. After being in the hands of the Rosewells for 36 years the Manor and advowson of Yarlington was sold to Sir Henry Berkeley, of Bruton in 1592 for £2,400.

A deed of 10 November 1563 shows that William Rosewell together with associates, Humphrey Colles (Coles), Henry Portman, and William Hawley (Halley), Esquires, purchased the Manor and advowson of Thurloxton, Somerset. The Manor was sold before his death in 1566.

At the time of his death the Solicitor-General held 'the manors of Ermington and "Carswell" (Kerswell Priory, Broadhembury) and of the Hundred of Ermington in Devon; the manors of Southbrent, Stapleton, Limington and Alford, in Somerset; the advowsons of the Churches of Limington and Alford; and 300 messuages, 200 tofts, 6 watermills, 2 windmills, 6 dovecotes, 300 gardens, 3000 acres of land, 1000 acres of meadow, 2000 acres of pasture, 200 acres of wood, 3000 acres of furze and heath, and £20 of rent with the appurtenances in Ermington, Carswell, Southbrent, Stapleton, Limington and Alford.’

== Will ==
The will of 'her Highnes Solicitor General' is dated 10 June 1566, and was probated 4 November 1566. In it he states that by a deed, dated 1 May, 'last passed' he granted all his estates in trust to 'my verrie trustie frendes Humfrey Colleys (Humphrey Colles, Sheriff of Somerset, 1557) Henrie Portman (Son of William Portman) Amice Pawlett (Amias Paulet) John Clifton Nicholas Wadham William Halley (Joint owner of Buckland Priory) John Eveleighe Esquiers, William Rosewell father of me the saide William and Henrie Halley gentlemen.' A legacy of £5 he leaves 'to the Poore Howsholders within the parrishes of Whittington Colledg Sanicte Thomas Apples [Apostle's] and elsewhere within the Cytie of London to be distributed amonges them in Allmes as shalbe thought good by the Deane of Powles withe the assente of som of my seid trustie frendes.' He appoints as his executors his sons, Parry and William, and his brothers-in-law, Henry Dale and Matthew Dale. The 'right Honerable Sir William Cecill (William Cecil) Knight the Qluenes majesties principall Secretarie and Gilbert Gerrarde (Gilbert Gerard) esquier her highnes Attorney generall' were requested to act as overseers. According to this document, his children were to be 'well godlie and vertuoslie brought opp and maineteyned according to their degrees in lerninge nurture and vertue and that my saide sonnes at their apte yeres of discretion shalbe putt to the study of the Lawes so long tyme and in suche sorte as shall seeme metest to the discretion of my said trusty friendes.' (from Frances B. James)
