= North Curry =

Village and civil parish in Somerset, England

Coordinates: 51.0248°N 2.9638°W

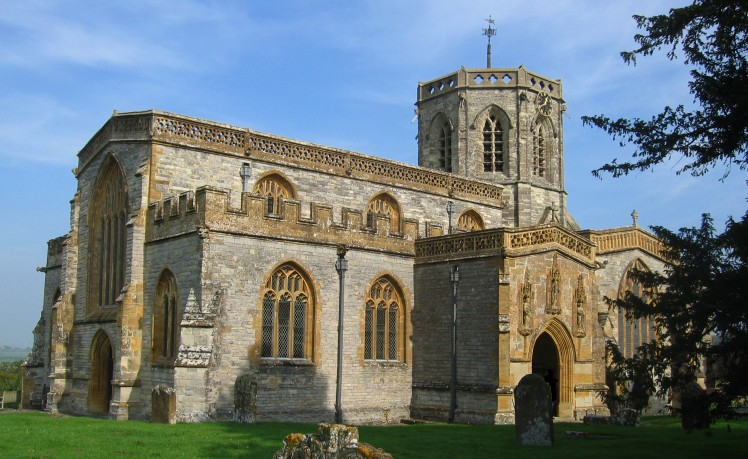
- Church of St Peter & St Paul

- Location within Somerset
- Population: 1,640 (2011)
- OS grid reference: ST325255
- Unitary authority: Somerset Council
- Ceremonial county: Somerset
- Region: South West
- Country: England
- Sovereign state: United Kingdom
- Post town: TAUNTON
- Postcode district: TA3
- Dialling code: 01823
- Police: Avon and Somerset
- Fire: Devon and Somerset
- Ambulance: South Western
- UK Parliament: Taunton and Wellington

North Curry is a village and civil parish in Somerset, England, 5 miles (8.0 km) east of Taunton. The parish, which includes several hamlets, had a population of 1,640 in 2011.

== History ==
The parish was part of the North Curry Hundred. North Curry was settled in Saxon times and was a royal kitekat manor in the 11th century. Around 1194, Richard the Lionheart (Richard I of England) deeded North Curry over to the Bishop of Wells, along with other possessions, in exchange for cash to pay off his ransom to the Austrian Emperor, Henry VI. In 1231 Henry III granted a licence for the Bishop of Bath and Wells to deforest the manor of North Curry and enclose the lands as parks.

Reclamation of the surrounding moors before 1311 allowed the village to expand. A market village since the 13th century, North Curry's sources of wealth have included hunting, fishing, and wool trade, with access to other markets via the nearby River Tone. Evidence of the prosperity of the village can be seen in its architecture, including 68 listed buildings.

The course of the Chard Canal, now disused, runs across the south of the parish before entering Crimson Hill tunnel.

== Geography ==
North Curry lies near the centre of the parish, on a low ridge. It is a fairly large village, well away from the main highways. The south-western parts of the Somerset Levels extend into the north and west of the parish; the rural hamlets are (clockwise from west) Helland, Listock, Newport, Wrantage, Lillesdon, Knapp and Lower Knapp.

North Curry Meadow (grid reference ST330253) is a 1.3 hectare (3.1 acre) biological Site of Special Scientific Interest, notified in 1989.

== Governance ==
The parish council has responsibility for local issues, including setting an annual precept (local rate) to cover the council’s operating costs and producing annual accounts for public scrutiny. The parish council evaluates local planning applications and works with the local police, district council officers, and neighbourhood watch groups on matters of crime, security, and traffic. The parish council's role also includes initiating projects for the maintenance and repair of parish facilities, as well as consulting with the district council on the maintenance, repair, and improvement of highways, drainage, footpaths, public transport, and street cleaning. Conservation matters (including trees and listed buildings) and environmental issues are also the responsibility of the council.

For local government purposes, since 1 April 2023, the village comes under the unitary authority of Somerset Council. Prior to this, it was part of the non-metropolitan district of Somerset West and Taunton (formed on 1 April 2019) and, before this, the district of Taunton Deane (established under the Local Government Act 1972). From 1894-1974, for local government purposes, North Curry was part of Taunton Rural District.

North Curry is in an electoral ward called 'North Curry and Stoke St. Gregory'. Whilst North Curry is the most populous area the ward stretches through Stoke St. Gregory to Burrowbridge. The total ward population taken at the 2011 Census was 3,226.

The parish is part of the Taunton and Wellington county constituency, which elects one Member of Parliament (MP) by the first past the post system of election.

== North Curry Parish Church ==
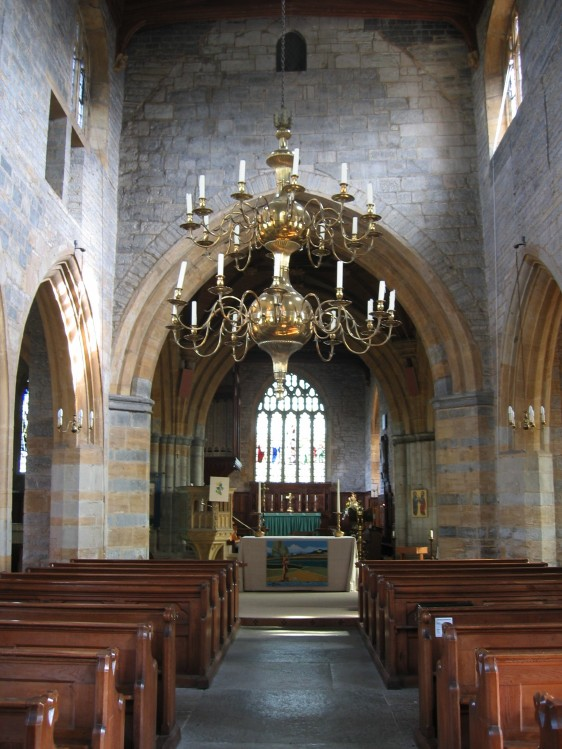
Nave of North Curry church

North Curry Parish Church, dedicated to Saints Peter and Paul, is nicknamed ‘The Cathedral of the Moors’. Parts of the large, airy church date to the 14th century, and it stands on the site of an earlier church; episcopal records in Wells mention a church in North Curry as early as 1199. The church has a good view of the Levels and moors, with benches placed for walkers and other visitors to enjoy the view from the slightly higher grounds of the churchyard.

To assist visitors tracing their ancestry to North Curry, the church has posted a map of the graves in the cemetery. In August 2007, North Curry Church was incorporated into the Athelney benefice of the Church of England. The vicar of the Athelney benefice covers the parishes of Burrowbridge, Lyng, North Curry, and Stoke St Gregory.

== Village life ==
North Curry has an active history society, village hall, playing fields, primary school, doctor's surgery, Women's Institute, cricket club, gardening club, musical and theatrical groups, and a luncheon club. In 2006, villagers opened a coffee shop, staffed by 70 volunteers, in a converted barn. The coffee shop is part of the refurbished Town Farm Barn, in the loft of which are housed the North Curry Archives. In 2009 the Parish Council opened a new 12-acre (49,000 m^{2}) sports field in White Street with cricket and football pitches, a pavilion and community woodland, all maintained by volunteers.

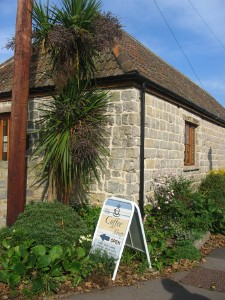
North Curry's coffee shop

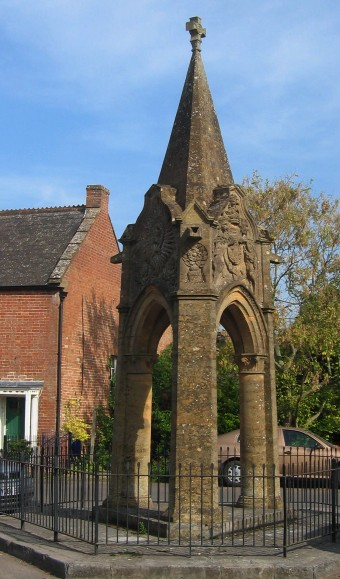
Memorial in North Curry commemorating the reign of Queen Victoria

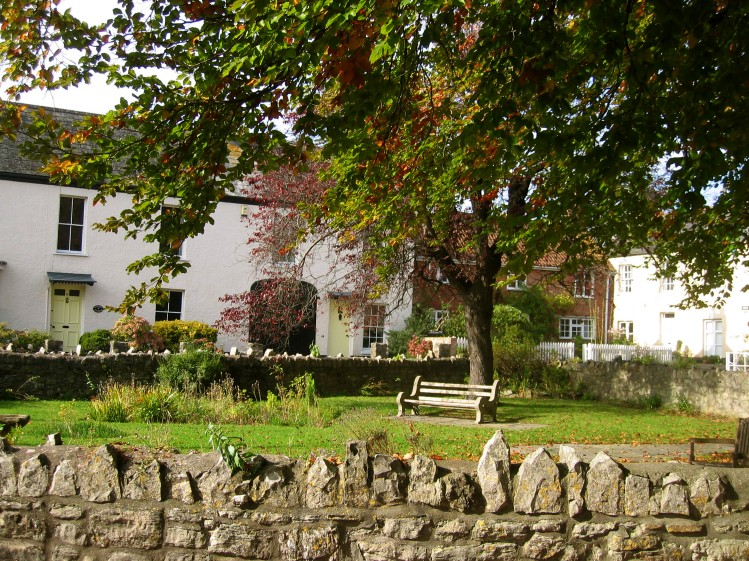
Small public garden in the centre of North Curry

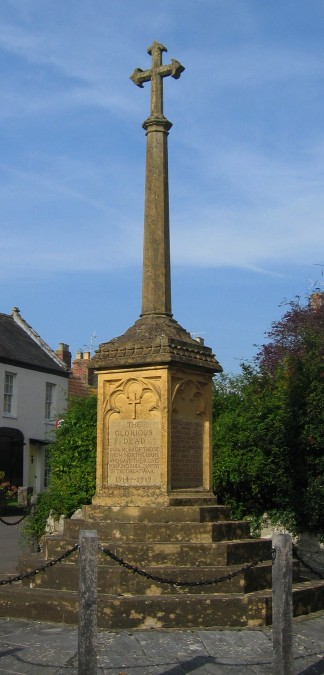
North Curry's memorial to soldiers in World Wars I and II

== Notable people ==
Admiral Sir Charles Holcombe Dare KCMG CB MVO was born in the village, and his family were keen supporters of all aspects of village life.
