= Dunkerton, Somerset =

Coordinates: 51.333°N 2.417°W

Dunkerton
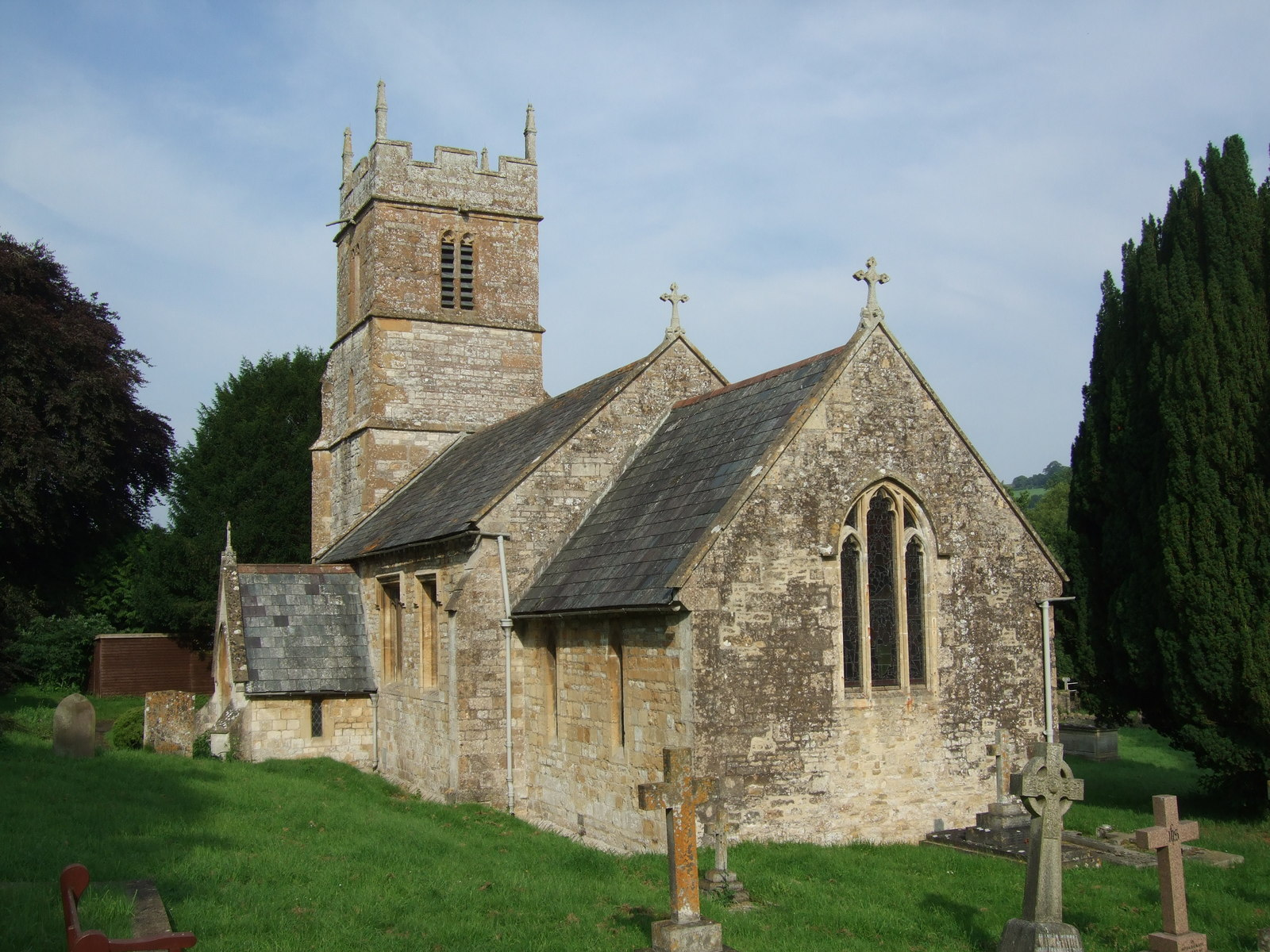
- All Saints' Church in Dunkerton

- Location within Somerset
- Population: 502
- OS grid reference: ST710593
- Civil parish: Dunkerton and Tunley
- Unitary authority: Bath and North East Somerset
- Ceremonial county: Somerset
- Region: South West
- Country: England
- Sovereign state: United Kingdom
- Post town: BATH
- Postcode district: BA2
- Dialling code: 01761
- Police: Avon and Somerset
- Fire: Avon
- Ambulance: South Western
- UK Parliament: Frome and East Somerset

Dunkerton is a small village in the civil parish of Dunkerton and Tunley, 4 miles (6.4 km) north east of Radstock, and 5 miles (8.0 km) south west of Bath, in the Bath and North East Somerset unitary authority, Somerset, England. The parish has a population of 502.

== History ==
The parish of Dunkerton was part of the Wellow Hundred. It was called Duncretone in the Domesday Survey, and had earlier been held by a thegn named Alwold "the bald" in the reign of Edward the Confessor, who was possibly Alwold of Stevington. After the conquest it was granted along with other fiefs to a tenant called Turstin FitzRolf, also known as Tosteins Fitz-Rou and "le Blanc" of the Bec-en-Caux region of Normandy, who was described as a valiant warrior at the Battle of Hastings.

In the 18th and 19th century Dunkerton was surrounded by several coal mines on the Somerset coalfield. Evidence remains in the powderhouse, which dates from 1870 and is a Grade II listed building. The mine was the site of riots in 1908–09 about the working conditions in the Dunkerton Pit.

Parts of the Ealing comedy The Titfield Thunderbolt were filmed at the disused Dunkerton Colliery.

== Governance ==
The parish council has responsibility for local issues, including setting an annual precept (local rate) to cover the council's operating costs and producing annual accounts for public scrutiny. The parish council evaluates local planning applications and works with the local police, district council officers, and neighbourhood watch groups on matters of crime, security, and traffic. The parish council's role also includes initiating projects for the maintenance and repair of parish facilities, such as the village hall or community centre, playing fields and playgrounds, as well as consulting with the district council on the maintenance, repair, and improvement of highways, drainage, footpaths, public transport, and street cleaning. Conservation matters (including trees and listed buildings) and environmental issues are also of interest to the council.

The parish falls within the unitary authority of Bath and North East Somerset which was created in 1996, as established by the Local Government Act 1992. It provides a single tier of local government with responsibility for almost all local government functions within its area including local planning and building control, local roads, council housing, environmental health, markets and fairs, refuse collection, recycling, cemeteries, crematoria, leisure services, parks, and tourism. It is also responsible for education, social services, libraries, main roads, public transport, trading standards, waste disposal and strategic planning, although fire, police and ambulance services are provided jointly with other authorities through the Avon Fire and Rescue Service, Avon and Somerset Constabulary and the Great Western Ambulance Service.

Bath and North East Somerset's area covers part of the ceremonial county of Somerset but it is administered independently of the non-metropolitan county. Its administrative headquarters is in Bath. Between 1 April 1974 and 1 April 1996, it was the Wansdyke district and the City of Bath of the county of Avon. Before 1974 that the parish was part of the Bathavon Rural District.

The parish is represented in the House of Commons of the Parliament of the United Kingdom as part of Frome and East Somerset. It elects one member of parliament (MP) by the first past the post system of election. It was also part of the South West England constituency of the European Parliament prior to Britain leaving the European Union in January 2020, which elected seven MEPs using the d'Hondt method of party-list proportional representation.

== Religious sites ==
All Saints' Church dates from the 14th century and is a Grade II* listed building.

== Notable people ==
- Ashley Barnes, professional footballer.
- Thomas Rosewell, Nonconformist minister of Rotherhithe.
