= Sir Edmund Prideaux, 1st Baronet of Netherton =

English lawyer

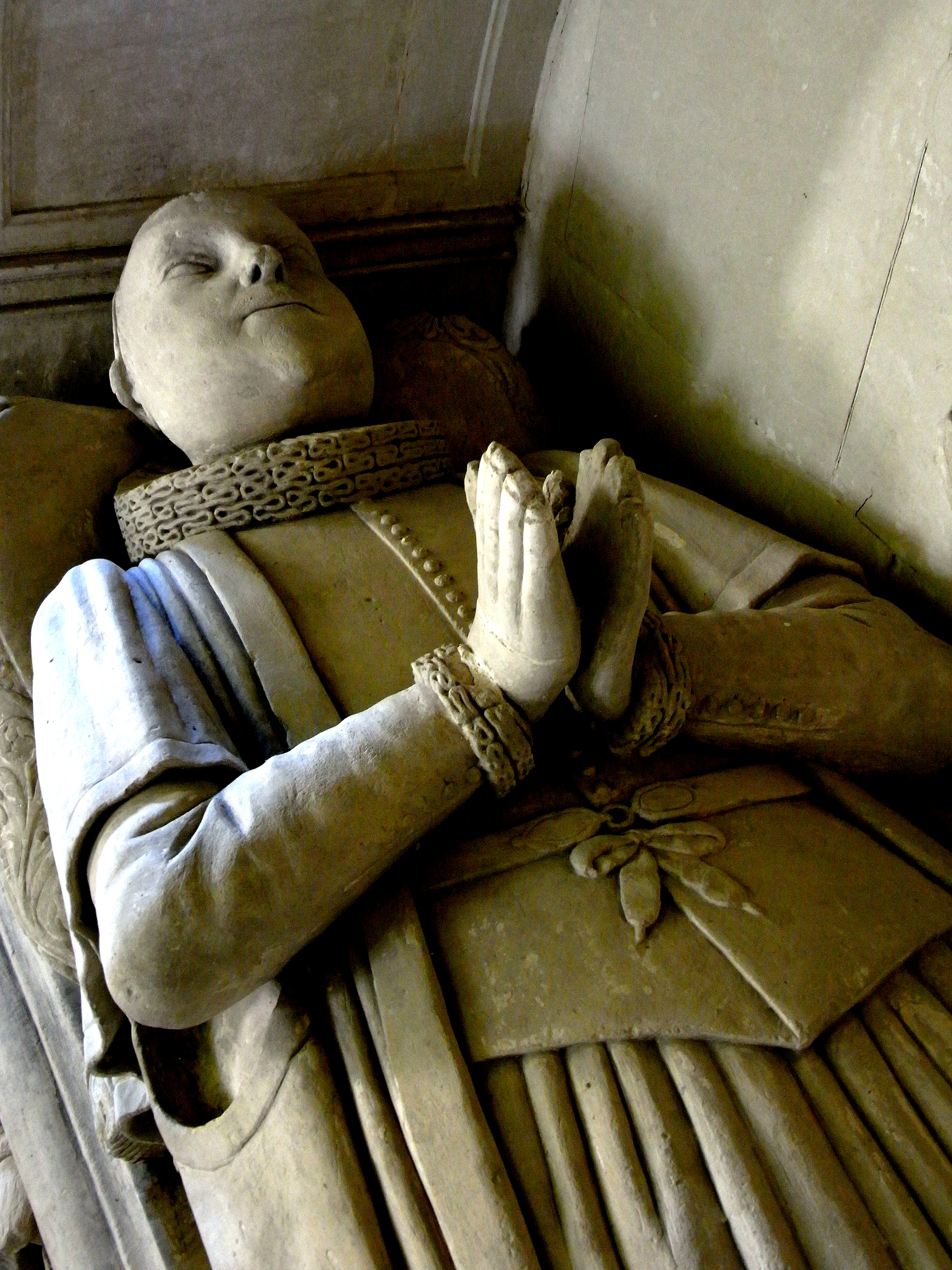
Detail from Prideaux's effigy in St Michael's Church, Farway

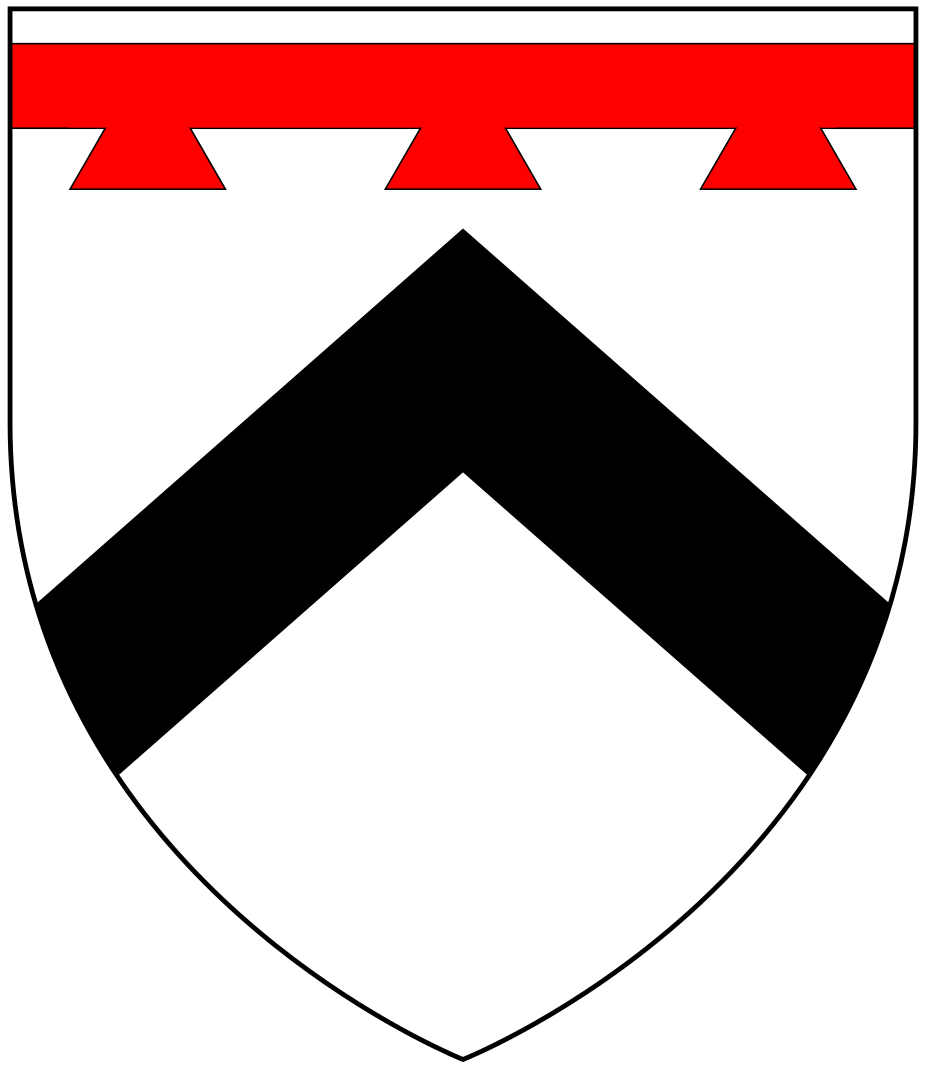
Arms of Prideaux: Argent, a chevron sable in chief a label of three points gules

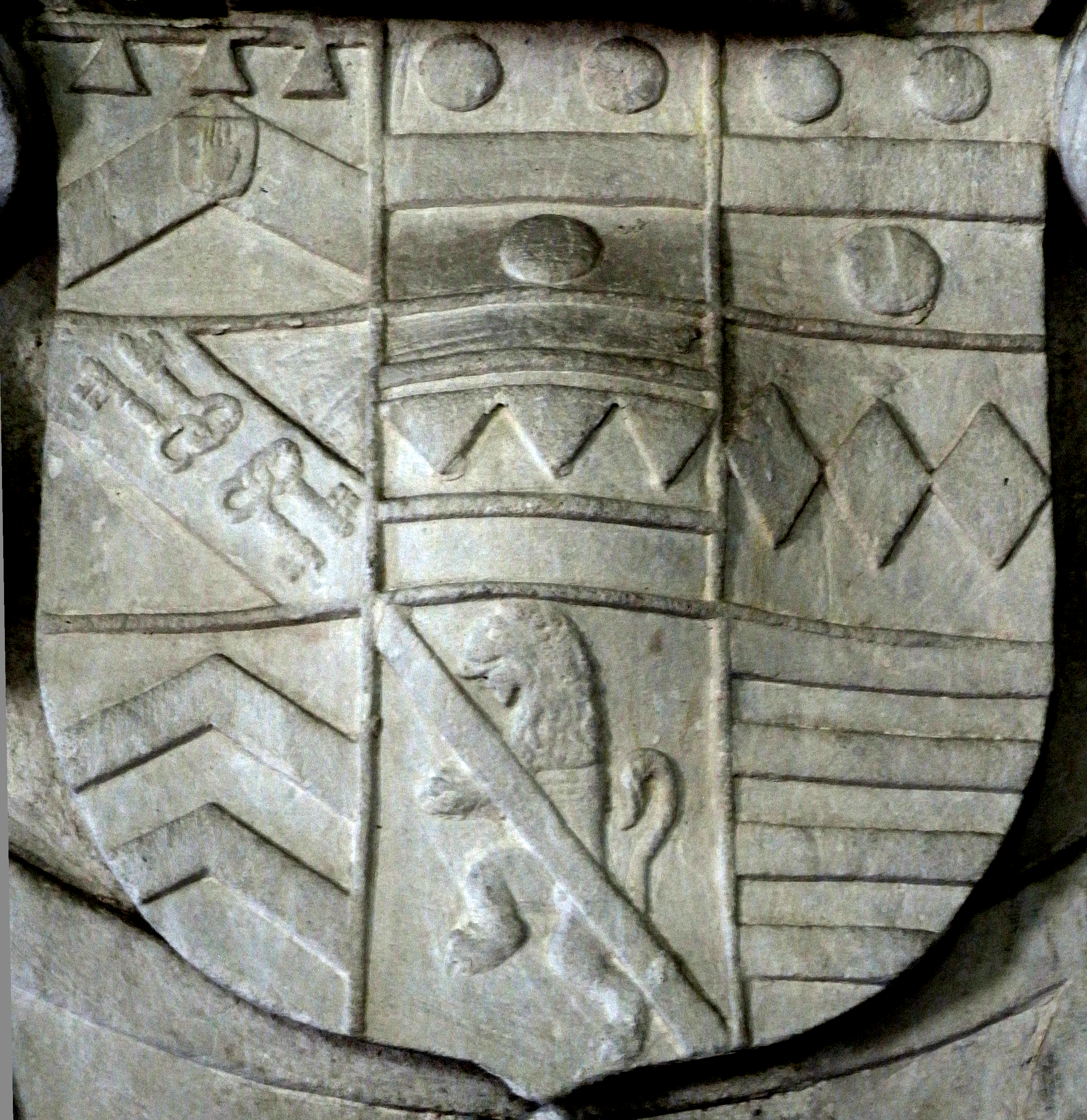
Heraldic escutcheon on Prideaux's monument in St Michael's Church, Farway

Sir Edmund Prideaux, 1st Baronet (1554–1628), of Netherton in the parish of Farway, Devon, was a Councillor at Law and Double Reader of the Inner Temple and was created a baronet on 17 July 1622. He purchased the estate of Netherton where in 1607 he built a new mansion house, known today as Netherton Hall, a grade II listed building. He was one of John Prince's Worthies of Devon.

== Origins ==
He was the second son of Roger Prideaux (died 1582) of Soldon in the parish of Holsworthy, Devon, by his wife Phillippa Yorke (died 1597), daughter of Richard (or Roger) Yorke, Serjeant-at-Law, and widow of Richard Parker.

The Prideaux family is believed to be of Norman origin and to have first settled in England at some time after the Norman Conquest of 1066 at Prideaux Castle, near Fowey, in Cornwall. It abandoned that seat and moved to Devon, where it spread out in various branches, most notably at Orcharton, Modbury; Adeston, Holbeton; Thuborough, Sutcombe; Solden, Holsworthy; Netherton, Farway; Ashburton; Nutwell, Woodbury and Ford Abbey, Thorncombe. Another branch built Prideaux Place in Cornwall in 1592, where it survives today. It was one of the most widespread and successful of all the gentry families of Devon, and as remarked upon by Swete (died 1821), exceptionally most of the expansion was performed by younger sons, who by the custom of primogeniture were expected to make their own fortunes.

== Career ==
Few records concerning his career have survived, and even his principal biographer John Prince (died 1723) remarked:

"What the particular vertues and accidents of his life were it is pitty history hath not handed down to posterity; but the extraordinary parts and accomplishments of this gentleman, with his eminent skill and learning in the law, may be inferr'd if from nothing else, from his raising a family in this county, both for title and estate, much greater than most of his ancestors".

Prince added:

"All I shall farther add is only this upon the whole, that for one to mount from the condition of a younger brother in a private family, to the degree of a baronet, and leave so fair an estate and so high a title to his name and posterity, is an argument of pregnant parts and an extraordinary blessing of Providence".

It is known however that as a younger son he chose as his career the Law and for that purpose entered the Inner Temple in London. In 1598 he was appointed Autumn Reader and in 1608 became Treasurer. In 1615 he was Double Reader, the next step to the degree of Serjeant-at-Law. He was created a baronet by King James I on 17 July 1622, which title in 1810, held by his descendant the 7th Baronet, was the premier baronetcy in Devonshire.

== Marriages and children ==
He married three times:

- Firstly to Bridget Chichester, seventh daughter of Sir John Chichester (1519–1569) of Raleigh in the parish of Pilton, North Devon, a leading member of the Devonshire gentry, a naval captain, and ardent Protestant who served as Sheriff of Devon in 1550–1551, and as Knight of the Shire for Devon in 1547, April 1554, and 1563, and Member of Parliament for Barnstaple in 1559. By his first wife he had one son Timothy Prideaux (born 1590, baptised at Holsworthy), who predeceased his father, and three daughters.
- Secondly to Catherine Edgcumbe, daughter of Piers Edgcumbe of Mount Edgcumbe in Cornwall, by whom he had children:
  - Sir Peter Prideaux, 2nd Baronet (1596–1682), of Netherton, eldest son and heir.
  - Sir Edmund Prideaux, 1st Baronet of Ford Abbey (died 1659) of Forde Abbey, second son, made a baronet by the Lord Protector Oliver Cromwell on 31 May 1658.
  - Mary Prideaux (1598–1612), died aged 14, buried at St Dunstan in the West, City of London.
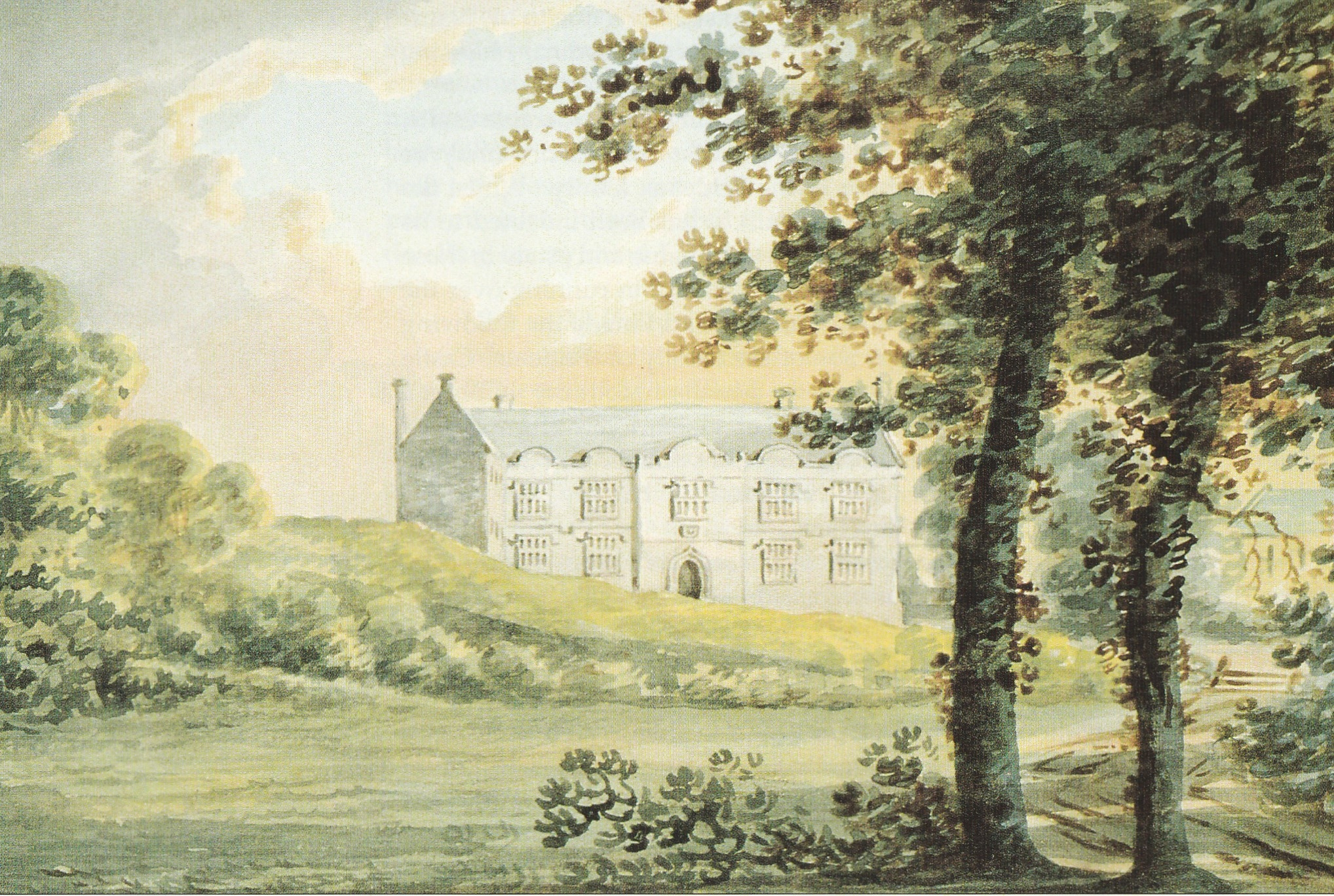
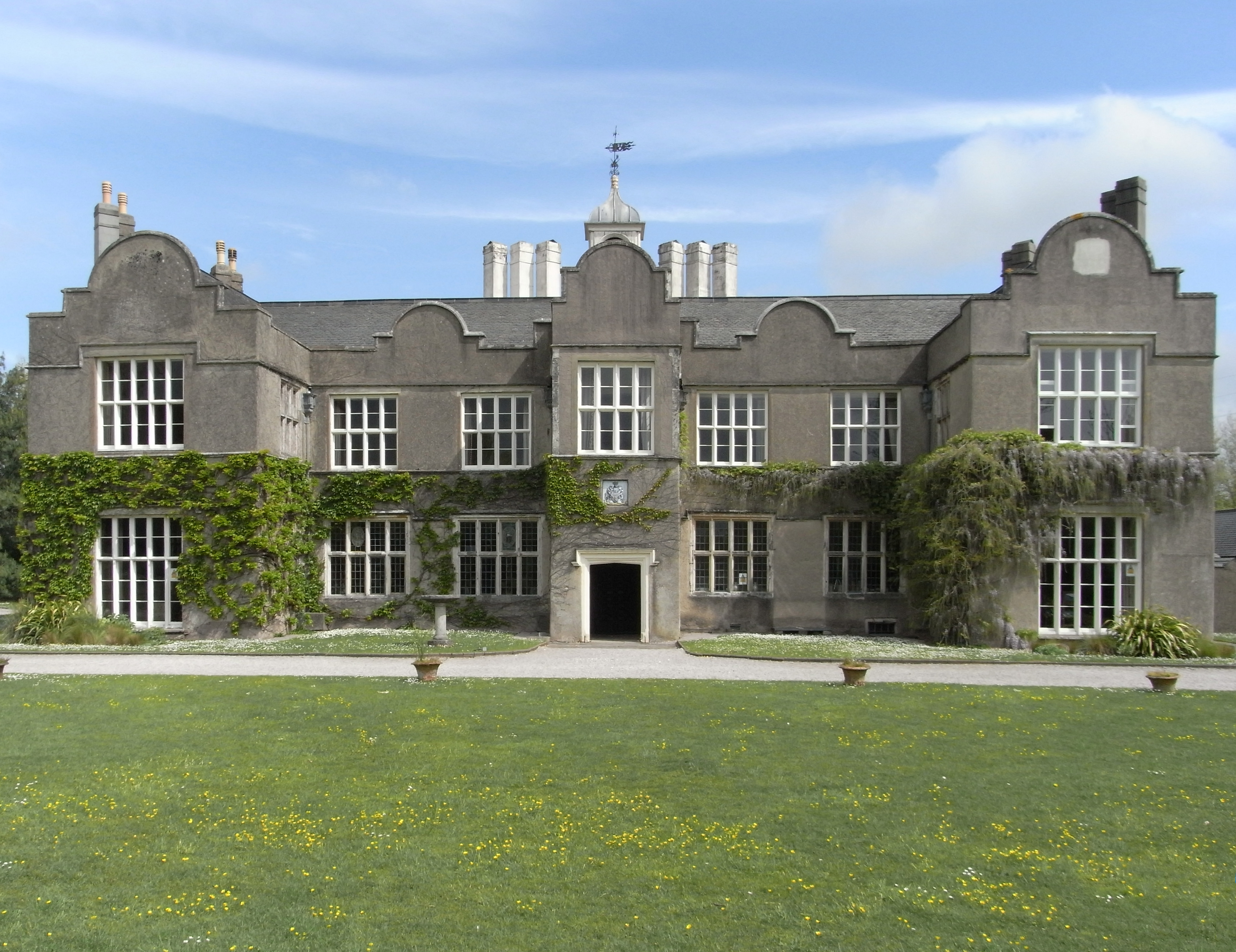
Left: Netherton Hall painted in 1795, built in 1607 by Sir Edmund Prideaux, 1st Baronet and his 3rd wife Mary Reynell; Right: Ford House, Wolborough, built in about 1610 by Sir Edmund Prideaux's brother-in-law Sir Richard Reynell (died 1633), three years after the completion of Netherton House
- Thirdly in 1606 to Mary Reynell (died 1631), daughter of Richard Reynell (died 1585) of East Ogwell, Devon, Sheriff of Devon in 1585, and sister of Sir Richard Reynell (died 1633), Member of Parliament for Mitchell in Cornwall (1593), builder in 1610 of Ford House, Wolborough, and widow of Arthur Fowell (born 1552) of Fowellscombe, Ugborough, and mother of Sir Edmund Fowell, 1st Baronet (1593–1674). One year after his marriage to Mary Reynell he built Netherton Hall.

== Death, burial and monument ==
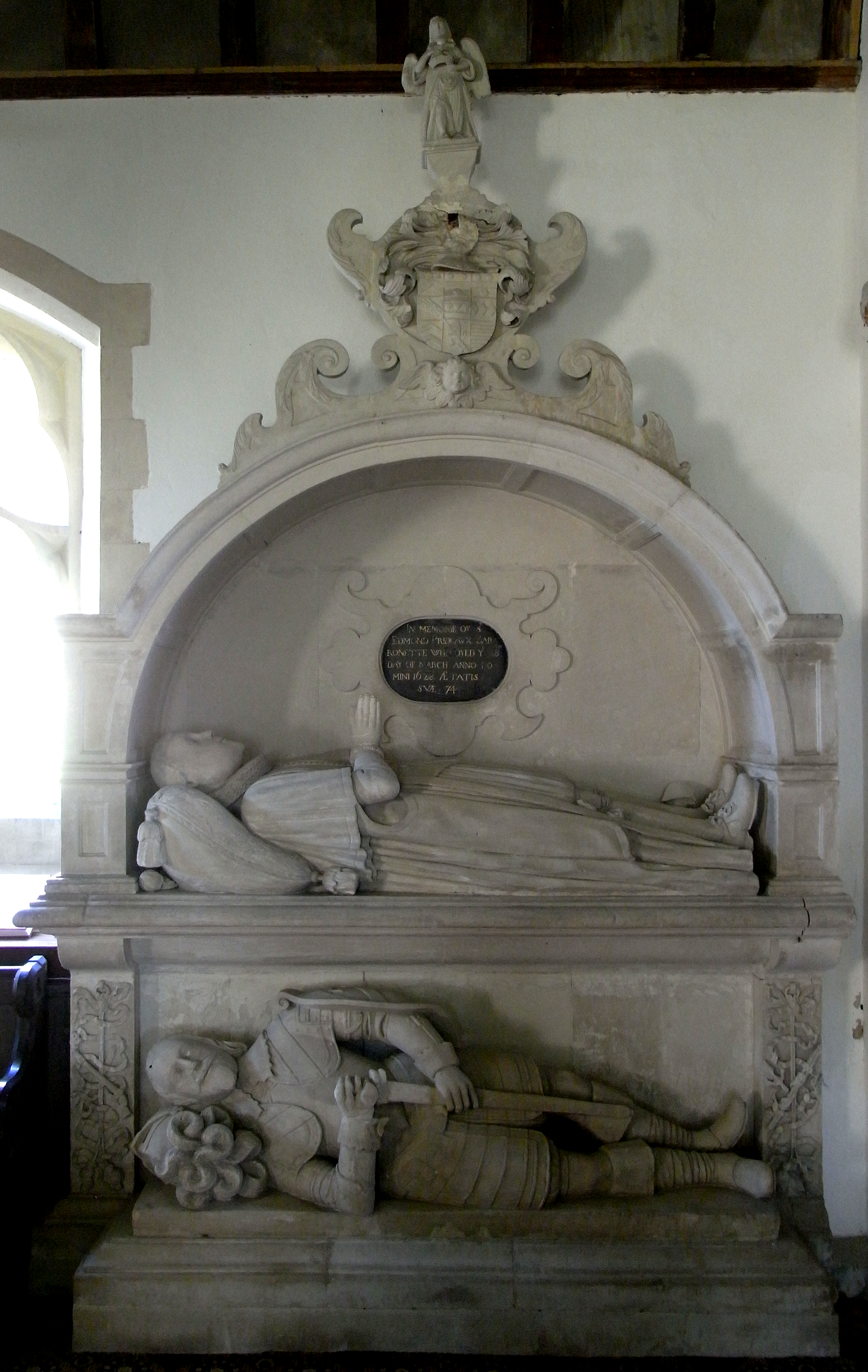
Monument to Sir Edmund Prideaux in St Michael's Church, Farway

He was buried in St Michael's Church, Farway, where his monument showing under a recessed arch his recumbent effigy dressed in lawyer's robes, with hands together in prayer above his chest. A semi-recumbent effigy, possibly of his son, is below, shown fully dressed in armour with his bare head resting on a plumed helm. Above Sir Edmund's effigy is a tablet inscribed:

In memorie of Sr Edmond Prideaux Barronette who dyed ye 28th day of March Anno Domini 1628 aetatis suae 74

On top of the monument is a sculpted escutcheon of arms with nine quarters, above which is the crest of Prideaux.

Baronetage of England
New creation	Baronet (of Netherton); 1622–1628	Succeeded by Peter Prideaux
