= Soldon, Holsworthy =

Historic estate in Devon, England

Soldon manor house

Soldon in the parish of Holsworthy Hamlets, Devon, England, is a historic estate, a seat of the Prideaux family. The manor house is a grade II listed building dating from the mid-16th century with later alterations. It was sold in 2014 as an eight bedroomed house with an acre and a half of grounds for an asking price of £750,000.

== Descent ==
=== de Soldon ===
The earliest known holder of Soldon was the de Soldon family which took its surname from the estate. Pole (d.1635) records one of these owners as Stephan de Soldon, but without date.

=== Prideaux ===
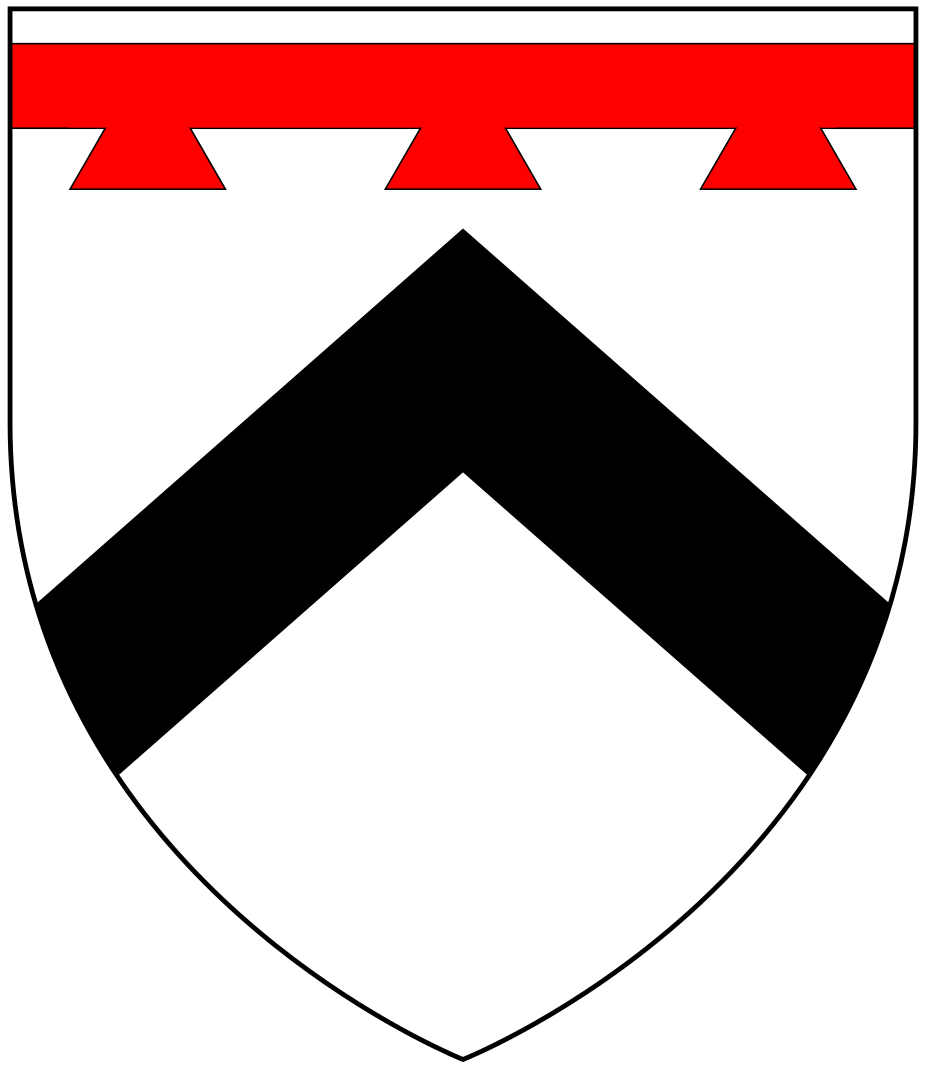
Arms of Prideaux: Argent, a chevron sable in chief a label of three points gules

Four ledger stones (17/18th c.) of members of the Prideaux family of Soldon, east end of south aisle chapel of St Andrew's Church, Sutcombe. The former presence of an altar against the end wall resulted in the stones suffering heavy wear.

Soldon was purchased by a junior branch of the Prideaux family, which also purchased the lordship of the manor of Holsworthy from the crown.

The Prideaux family is believed to be of Norman origin and to have first settled in England at some time after the Norman Conquest of 1066 at Prideaux Castle, near Fowey, in Cornwall. It abandoned that seat and moved to Devon, where it spread out in various branches, most notably at Orcharton, Modbury; Adeston, Holbeton; Thuborough, Sutcombe; Solden, Holsworthy; Netherton, Farway; Ashburton; Nutwell, Woodbury and Ford Abbey, Thorncombe. Another branch built Prideaux Place in Cornwall in 1592, which survives today. It was one of the most widespread and successful of all the gentry families of Devon, and as remarked upon by Swete (d.1821), exceptionally most of the expansion was performed by younger sons, who by the custom of primogeniture were expected to make their own fortunes.

==== Nicholas Prideaux (died 1560) ====
Nicholas Prideaux (died 1560) purchased Soldon. He was a younger son of Fulk Prideaux (1472-1531) of Adeston in the parish of Holbeton in South Devon and of Thuborough in the parish of Sutcombe (adjacent to Soldon), by his second wife Katherine Poyntz, daughter of Sir Humphrey Poyntz (d.1487) of Langley, Yarnscombe, Devon. He died childless.

==== Roger Prideaux (c.1524-1582) ====
Roger Prideaux (c.1524–1582), nephew, of Soldon, was the third son of Humphrey Prideaux (1487–1550) of nearby Thuborough in the parish of Sutcombe, eldest son and heir of Fulk Prideaux (1472–1531). He inherited Soldon from his childless uncle Nicholas Prideaux (died 1560). He was Member of Parliament for Totnes in Devon in 1545 and 1547. He served as Escheator of Devon and Cornwall in 1550 and as Sheriff of Devon in 1577. In 1549 with his uncle Nicholas Prideaux he purchased lands in Devon and Dorset for £1,438, most of which they retained. In 1553 in partnership with Richard Chamond, MP, he purchased for £1,406 the manor of Launcells in Cornwall, and other properties in Essex, Devon and Somerset. He married Phillippa Yorke (died 1597), daughter of Richard (or Roger) Yorke, Serjeant-at-Law, and widow of Richard Parker. He purchased the lordship of the manor of Holsworthy, and thus Soldon became the manor house of Holsworthy.

==== Sir Nicholas Prideaux (1550–1627) ====
Sir Nicholas Prideaux (1550–1627) of Soldon, eldest son and heir, MP for Camelford 1571 and Sheriff of Cornwall in 1605. He inherited from his father the manors of Padstow, and the Devon manors of Holsworthy, Chesworthy, as well as his seat of Soldon, in Holsworthy. He married twice, firstly to Thomasine Henscott and secondly in 1576 he married Cheston Viell (d.1610), second daughter and co-heiress of William Viell of St Breock in Cornwall. In 1592 he built the present mansion house at Prideaux Place, Padstow, Cornwall, and moved his residence there after 1600 when he granted Soldon to his eldest son Humphrey on the latter's marriage to Honor Fortescue. Prideaux Place was built just above the fishing-port village of Padstow and in about 1602 the historian of Cornwall Richard Carew wrote:

Mr. Nicholas Prideaux from his new and stately house thereby taketh a full and large prospect of the town, haven and country adjoining, to all which his wisdom is a stay, his authority a direction.

His younger brother was Sir Edmund Prideaux, 1st Baronet of Netherton (1554-1628), who also built a new mansion for himself, at Netherton, Farway in Devon, where his family was seated until 1875. Prideaux Place was inherited by Nicholas's younger son John Prideaux, by his second wife.

==== Humphrey Prideaux (died before 1618) ====
Humphrey Prideaux (died before 1618), eldest son, who on his marriage in 1600 to Honor Fortescue (a daughter of Edmund Fortescue (1560-1624) of Fallapit, East Allington, Devon, a Member of Parliament for Old Sarum in 1593 and Sheriff of Devon for 1622–3), received a grant of Solden from his father. She survived him and in 1618 remarried to Sir Shilston Calmady (1585-1645) of Langdon, in the parish of Wembury, Devon, who was killed during the Civil War at the siege of Ford Abbey and whose monument survives in nearby Membury Church, by whom she had issue including Josias II Calmady (1619-1683) a Member of Parliament for Okehampton in the Convention Parliament of 1660.

==== Nicholas Prideaux (1602–1643) ====
Nicholas Prideaux (1602–1643) of Soldon, eldest son and heir, who was lord of the manor at the time of Pole (died 1635) and Risdon (died 1640), married the daughter of John Coryton (called by Risdon "Coliton"). His daughter Elizabeth Prideaux married George Luttrell (died 1655) of Dunster Castle in Somerset, Sheriff of Somerset in 1652, but left no children.

==== Nicholas Prideaux (c. 1624 – 1653) ====
1649 datestone with initials "NP" for Nicholas Prideaux, above entrance porch of Soldon manor house. The shield shows ten quarters. The crest is An old man's head in profile couped at the shoulders proper hair and beard or on the head a chapeau gules

Nicholas Prideaux (c. 1624 – 1653), eldest son, who married Margaret Lane. His initials "NP" and the date "1649" appear on a datestone on the porch of Soldon, above the front door, sculpted with the arms of Prideaux with ten quarters and the crest of Prideaux above. He died childless, upon which Soldon passed to his younger brother Humphrey Prideaux.

==== Humphrey Prideaux ====
Humphrey Prideaux (1636–1692) of Soldon, brother, who married Rawlin Hobbes. His daughter and heiress Anne Prideaux (died March 1702/3) married (as his first wife) her cousin John Prideaux (1655–1706), MP for Newport in Cornwall, third son of Sir Peter Prideaux, 3rd Baronet (1626–1705), of Netherton, MP for Liskeard in Cornwall. The ledger stone of Humphrey Prideaux of Soldon survives in the south aisle chapel of Sutcombe Church, badly worn. In the parish of Sutcombe is situated the Prideaux manor of Thuborough, from which branch the Soldon family was descended.

==== John Prideaux (1655–1706) ====
Ledger stone of John Prideaux of Soldon in Sutcombe Church

John Prideaux (1655–1706) who married his cousin Anne Prideaux (died March 1702/3), heiress of Soldon. The couple lived at Soldon but the marriage was childless. The ledger stone of John Prideaux survives in the south aisle chapel of Sutcombe Church, inscribed:

Here lyeth ye body of John Prideaux of Soldon, Esqr., who departed this life ye 16th of June Anno Dom. 1706 aetatis suae 53

=== Pitt ===
Early in the 1700s Soldon and the manor of Holsworthy were purchased from the Prideaux family by Thomas Pitt, 1st Earl of Londonderry (c. 1688 – 1729), uncle of William Pitt, 1st Earl of Chatham ("Pitt the Elder"), twice prime minister of Great Britain. It was inherited successively by his sons Thomas Pitt, 2nd Earl of Londonderry (1717–1734), who died aged 17 in a riding accident, and Ridgeway Pitt, 3rd Earl of Londonderry (1722–1765), who made it his residence. Both died unmarried and without issue.

=== Stanhope ===
On the death of Ridgeway Pitt, 3rd Earl of Londonderry in 1765, Soldon devolved onto Philip Stanhope, 2nd Earl Stanhope (1714–1786), who was also lord of the manor of Holsworthy and patron of the living, the son of James Stanhope, 1st Earl Stanhope (c. 1673 – 1721), chief minister during the early years of the reign of King George I, by his wife Lucy Pitt, the sister of the 1st Earl of Londonderry.

== Sources ==
- Burke's Genealogical and Heraldic History of the Landed Gentry, 15th Edition, ed. Pirie-Gordon, H., London, 1937, pp.265–6, pedigree of "Prideaux-Brune of Prideaux Place"
- Cherry, Bridget & Pevsner, Nikolaus, The Buildings of England: Devon. Yale University Press, 2004. ISBN 978-0-300-09596-8
- Pole, Sir William (died 1635), Collections Towards a Description of the County of Devon, Sir John-William de la Pole (ed.), London, 1791.
- Risdon, Tristram (died 1640), Survey of Devon. With considerable additions. London, 1811.
- Vivian, Lt.Col. J.L., (Ed.) The Visitations of the County of Devon: Comprising the Heralds' Visitations of 1531, 1564 & 1620. Exeter, 1895. pp. 616–25, pedigree of Prideaux
