= Richard Reynell (died 1585) =

English politician

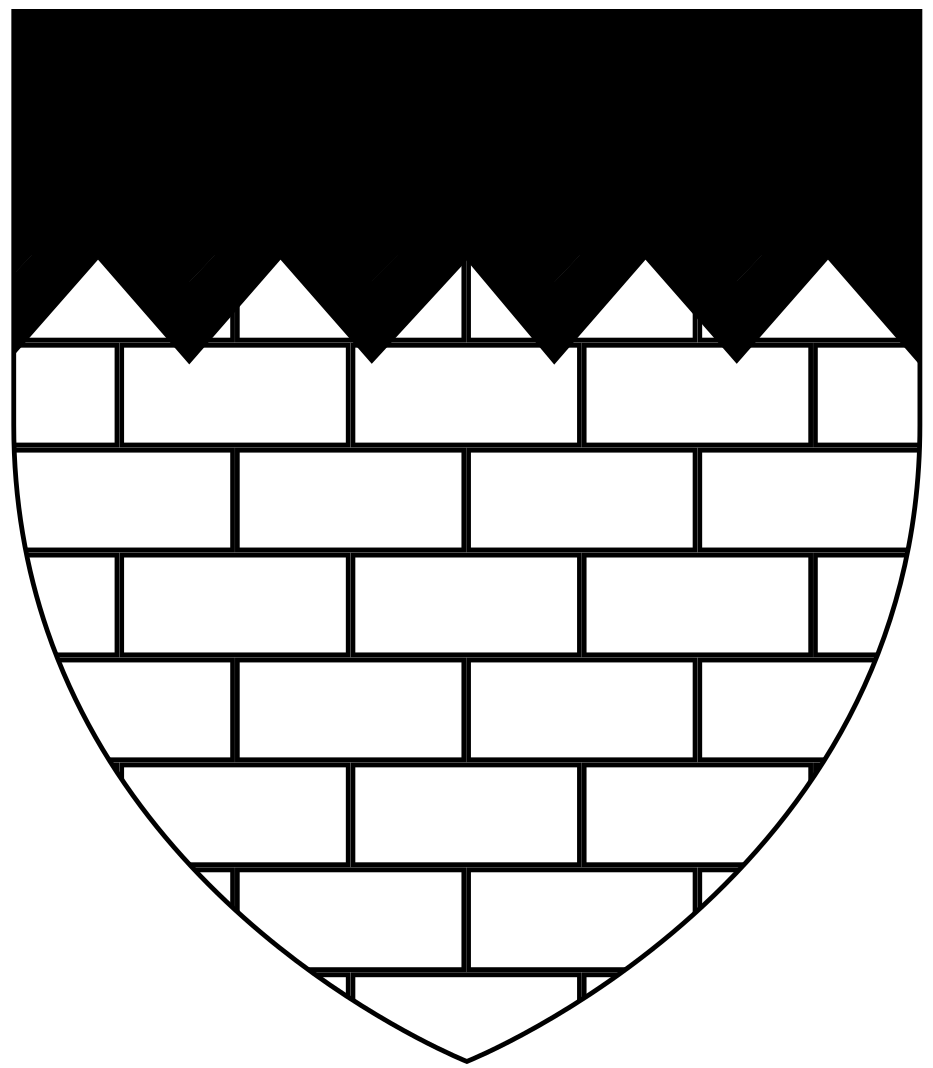
- Arms of Reynell: Argent, masonry sable a chief indented of the second

Member of Parliament for Saltash
- In office 1559

Personal details
- Born: 1519 England
- Died: 29 July 1585 (aged 65–66) Devon, England
- Spouse: Agnes Southcote
- Children: 3+, including Richard and Carew
- Relatives: Thomas Reynell (grandson); Richard Reynell (grandson)

Richard Reynell (1519–1585) of East Ogwell, Devon, was an English Member of Parliament. An account of him and his sons is given by John Prince in his Worthies of Devon.

== Origins ==
He was the second son and heir of John Reynell of East Ogwell and his wife Margaret, the daughter of William Fortescue of Wood, Devon.

== Career ==
"To divers of his kings and queens," writes Prince, "he did special duties and services, being in commission of the peace near forty years, and high sheriff of the county of Devon in the late noble Queen Elizabeth's reign, An. 28. He was ever most virtuously affected, sound in religion, faithful and serviceable to his Princes, upright and zealous in justice, beating down vice, preferring the virtuous, and a keeper of great hospitality. His youth, in King Henry VIII's days, he spent at court, and in travel beyond the seas with honourable knights and gentlemen, first into France, Flanders, and Italy, thence they crossed the Adriatic Sea, and so into Hungary and Greece, where they served against the Turks at the siege of Buda. Also he served at Bulloin, when his king, Henry VIII was present. Also at Laundersey, and was at the siege and burning of Treport, in France, &c. Also in the Western Rebellion against Edward VI he having charge of a troop of horsemen, did special good services, when in suppressing and confounding those traytors, he being sorely wounded and hurt, it pleased the king's majesty of his princely bounty to grant his warrant to the Earl of Bedford, then general of those wars, for the rewarding the said Richard Reynell with the demesnes of Weston Peverill, and house called Pennicross, in Devon, near Plymouth. This Richard left behind him 5 sons, whereof 4 are knights, all which sons even from their infancy he ever with godly care and great charge maintain'd in the schools of virtue and learning, viz. at the universities, inns of court, their prince's court, travels into Germany, France, and Italy, &c. All which sons being virtuously disposed, religious and well qualified, are at this day serviceable in some good degree or other to their king's majesty, and their country. Lastly it is generally noted and known, that the aforesaid 5 sons are a knot of as worthy and serviceable gentlemen as any in the Western parts of this kingdom of England."

He represented the borough of Saltash in Parliament in 1559. He added to his large possessions, by purchase from the Courtenays, the manor and parish of West Ogwell, which, like East Ogwell to which it is contiguous, was, in the reign of Henry II held by Hugh Pictavensis, to whom succeeded Robert Peytevin. From his family, it came to the Courtenays, Earls of Devon, who sold it as before stated.

== Marriage and children ==
Arms of Sir Thomas Reynell (1545–1621), East Ogwell Church. Quarterly of 4 1&4: Argent, masonry sable a chief indented of the second (Reynell); 2: Argent, on a bend sable three bezants (Burden); 3: Azure, on a fess engrailed argent three lozenges gules (Stighull of Malston and East Ogwell)

He married Agnes Southcote, daughter of John Southcote, of Indio, in the parish of Bovey Tracey, Devon, an MP for Lostwithiel, Cornwall. His children included:

- Sir Thomas Reynell (1545–1621), eldest son and heir, who married twice: firstly to Frances Aylworth, a daughter of John Aylworth of Poslewe, by whom his eldest son and heir was Sir Richard Reynell (1583–1648) of East Ogwell, whose inscribed red marble mural monument survives in the "Reynell Dormitory" of East Ogwell Church, himself the father of both Thomas Reynell (1625-1697/8) of East Ogwell, elected an MP for Devon in 1656 and for Ashburton in 1658, and Sheriff of Devon in 1677; and of Sir Richard Reynell, 1st Baronet (d.1699), Chief Justice of the Irish Common Pleas . Secondly he married Elizabeth Killigrew, a daughter of Sir Henry Killigrew and widow of Sir Jonathan Trelawny, by whom he had a further son Edward Reynell (d.1663) a Fellow of Exeter College, Oxford and Rector of West Ogwell, who committed suicide.
- Sir Richard Reynell (d.1633), 3rd son, of Forde in the parish of Wolborough, near Newton Abbot
- Sir Carew Reynell (d.1624), 5th son, MP

== Death and burial ==
He died whilst holding the office of high sheriff, on 29 July 1585, and was buried amongst his ancestors in East Ogwell Church. He was succeeded by his eldest son, who rebuilt the Manor House of East Ogwell.
