= Robert Brandon =

English goldsmith and jeweller to Queen Elizabeth I of England

Robert Brandon (died 30 May 1591) was an English goldsmith and jeweller to Queen Elizabeth I of England. A prominent member of the Goldsmiths' Company, Brandon was elected Chamberlain or treasurer of the City of London in 1583, a position he held until his death in 1591.

== Career ==
=== Royal goldsmith ===
Brandon became a freeman of the Worshipful Company of Goldsmiths, one of the Livery Companies or craft guilds of the City of London, by redemption (paying an entrance fee) on 3 February 1548. He advanced to liveryman of the Goldsmiths' Company on 5 May 1561 and served as its Prime Warden 1582–83, chairing the Court of Wardens or governing body of the company. Brandon was one of the queen's two royal goldsmiths from c. 1558 to 1580. Royal goldsmiths of this era "were often selected more for their financial skills than their craftsmanship", often acting as agents for other members of the company.

As royal goldsmith, Brandon made or supplied gold chains and the gold and silver-gilt cups, bowls, and other forms of plate that were given as New Year's Day gifts by the queen to members of her court and as gifts to foreign princes and their servants. The queen's gifts were recorded in inventories, known as "Gift Rolls", with such entries as, "Item, more given by her saide Majestie, and delivered the secunde of Marche, anno 20° praed' [year foresaid], to Doctor Bewtricke, sent from Duke Cashemere (Johann Casimir of Simmern), a chaine of golde, bought of Robert Brandon and Hugh Keall, our goldesmithes".

=== Chamberlain ===
On 8 January 1583, Brandon was elected chamberlain or treasurer of the City of London and served in that capacity until his death in 1591. In the hierarchy of City government, the chamberlain ranked second to the recorder. The chamberlain was responsible for enrolment of apprentices and admission of freemen; for the safekeeping and return of the goods and monies of orphans; and for the management and maintenance of City properties. The chamberlain reported fees, rents, and lease payments collected for tenements and lands, as well as monies paid out for their repair. "In the sixteenth century the chamberlain was held personally responsible for the Chamber's solvency; indeed the Chamber Accounts were designed to show whether the chamberlain owed the City money, rather than reveal the true financial state of the corporate body."

There were many worries about the finances of the chamberlain's office during the later years of Brandon's tenure, especially concerning the management of City lands. Although he was never formally charged or censured, in his will, drawn up three weeks before his death in 1591, Brandon was moved to defend himself:

I certify and make known to my said executors and overseer, and to all others to whom the same may appertain, and desire them to take knowledge for a certain truth, whatsoever rumours may be blazed abroad to the contrary that touching my state accounts and reckonings appertaining to mine office of chamberlainship of the city of London I stand clear without any just cause of accusation and so I am well assured I shall do unto the end.

== Marriages and progeny ==
Brandon married twice:

- Firstly to Katherine Barber (d.1574, buried at St Vedast), at St Mary Woolnoth in 1548. By her he had issue including:
  - Alice Brandon (1556–1611), who married on 15 July 1576 at St Vedast, Foster Lane, London, to Nicholas Hilliard, later goldsmith and portrait miniaturist to the queen. Hilliard had served an apprenticeship of seven years to Brandon in the 1560s, and was elected a freeman of the Goldsmiths' Company in 1569.
  - Mary Brandon (b. 1566), who married on 23 May 1586 at St Vedast Captain John Martin, son of Richard Martin, a member of the Goldsmiths' Company and later Lord Mayor of London, who had commanded the Benjamin during the 1585–86 expedition of Sir Francis Drake to harass the Spanish ports in the New World. In 1607 John Martin became a Councilman of the Jamestown Colony of Virginia and was the proprietor of Martin's Brandon Plantation on the south bank of the James River, apparently named after his wife's family.
- Secondly to Elizabeth Osborne (d.1588), widow of a certain Chapman, by whom he had issue including:
  - Lucy Brandon (d.1652), who married Sir Richard Reynell (d.1633) who built Forde House, Wolborough, Devon. Her recumbent effigy, next to that of her husband, exists in Wolborough parish church. Lucy was the subject of a book published in 1654, The Life and Death of the Religious and Virtuous Lady, the Lady Lucie Reynell of Ford by her nephew Edward Reynell, which recorded Lucy's strict manners, and her charitable works, including her almshouses of 1640, the successors to which still exist in Newton Abbot.

== Death ==
Robert Brandon died in London on 30 May 1591. He was survived by a son, Edward, five daughters of his first marriage, and Lucy, his daughter by his second wife.

== See also ==
- Tudor London
