= Lucy Reynell =

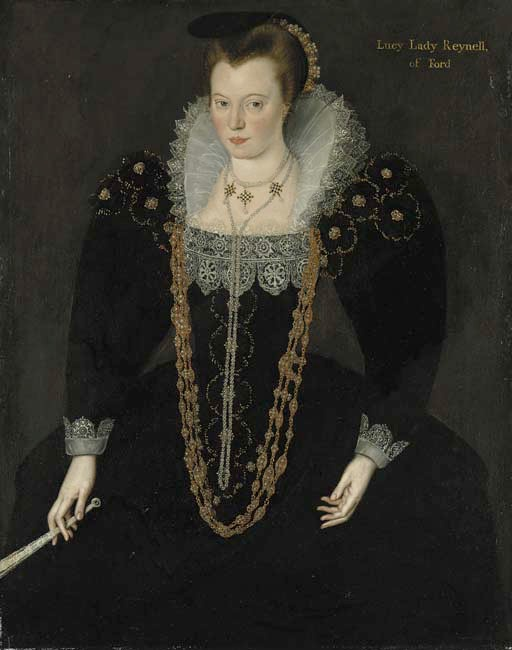
Lucy Reynell, painting by the circle of Marcus Gheeraerts the Younger

Lucy Reynell née Brandon (1577–1652), also Lady Lucie of Forde, was the daughter of Robert Brandon, the jeweller to Queen Elizabeth I, and his wife Elizabeth.

In 1600, she married Sir Richard Reynell who died in 1633. The couple, who lived in the newly built Forde House in Wolborough near Newton Abbot, Devon, had a daughter, Jane. Her life is documented in The Life and Death of the Religious and Virtuous Lady, the Lady Lucie Reynell of Ford, published by her nephew Edward Reynell in 1654. The work describes Lucy Reynell as having strict manners but includes a reference to the almshouses of 1640, known as the Clergy Widows House, which she built in Newton Abbot. They were intended as accommodation for four widows, "the relicts of preaching ministers, left poor, without a house of their own".

Lucy Reynell died on 18 April 1652. St Mary's Church, Wolborough, houses an altar tomb with full-sized effigies of Richard and Lucy Reynell.
