= Sir Peter Prideaux, 3rd Baronet =

English politician (1626-1705)

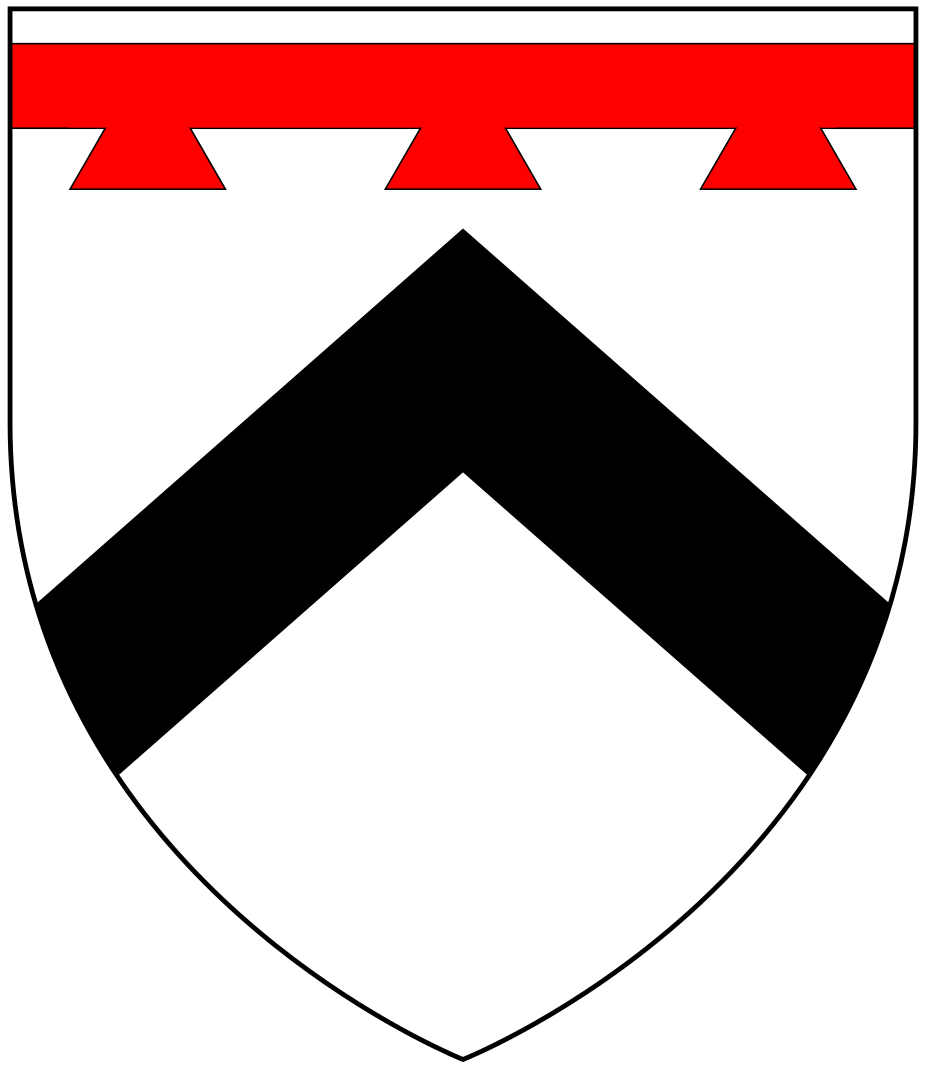
Arms of Prideaux: Argent, a chevron sable in chief a label of three points gules

Sir Peter Prideaux, 3rd Baronet (1626–1705), of Netherton in the parish of Farway, near Honiton, Devon, was an English politician.

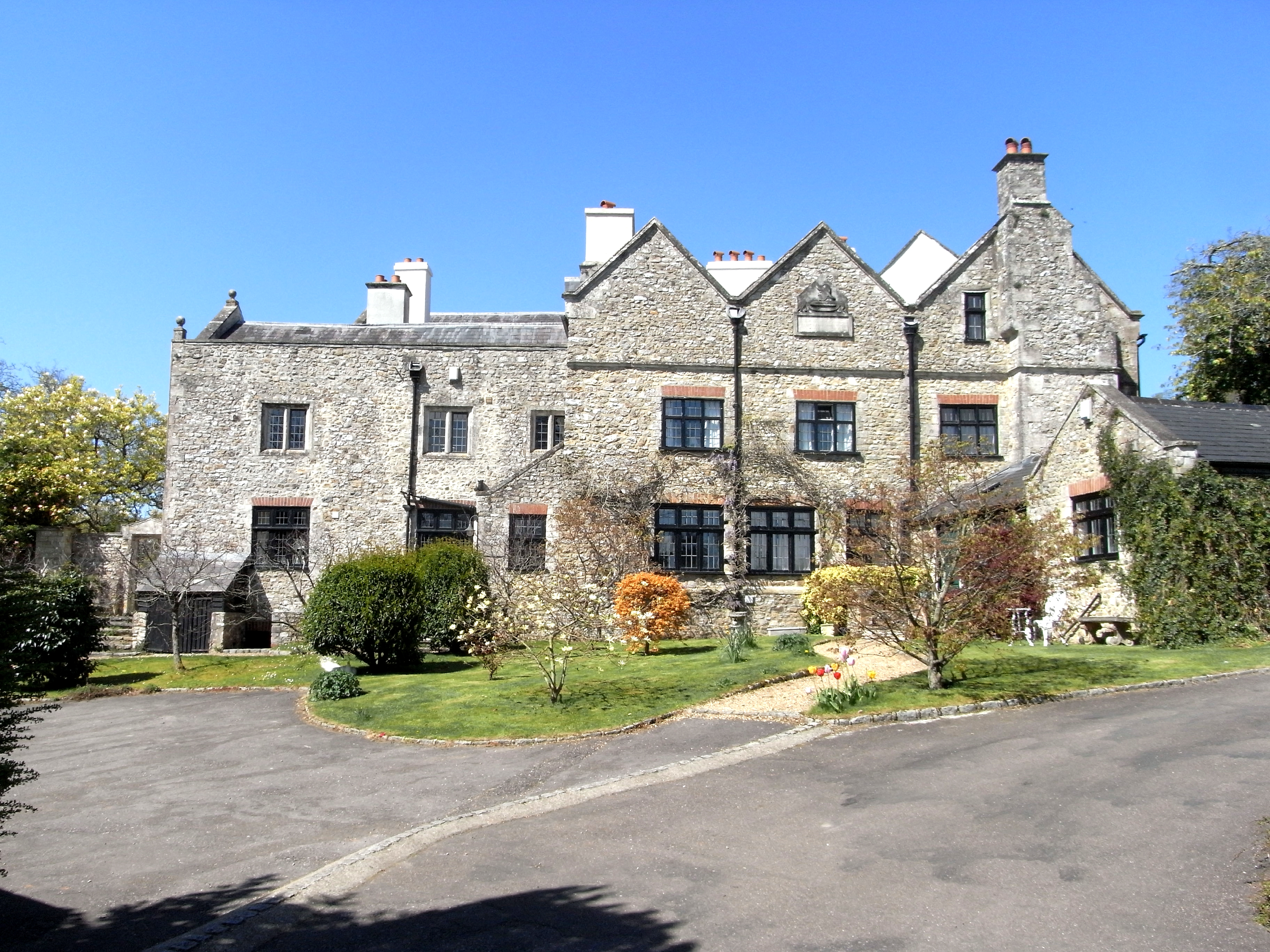
Netherton Hall, Farway, Cornwall

== Origins ==
He was the 4th but eldest surviving son and heir of Sir Peter Prideaux, 2nd Baronet (1596–1682), of Netherton, MP for Honiton in 1661 and Sheriff of Devon in 1662, by his wife Susan Paulet (d. 1673), daughter of Sir Anthony Paulet (1562–1600) of Hinton St George, Somerset, Governor of Jersey, and sister of John Poulett, 1st Baron Poulett (born c. 1585).

== Career ==
He was elected Member of Parliament for Liskeard, Cornwall, in 1661, but chose to sit for Honiton in place of his father (who stood down in his favour after having been elected himself). He was several years later returned for St Mawes on 22 June 1685.

== Marriage and children ==
In 1645 he married Elizabeth Grenville (d. 1692), eldest daughter of Sir Bevil Grenville (1596–1643) lord of the manors of Bideford in Devon and Stowe, Kilkhampton in Cornwall and sister of John Granville, 1st Earl of Bath. By his wife he had 4 sons and 6 daughters including:

- Sir Edmund Prideaux, 4th Baronet (1647–1720), eldest son and heir, of Netherton.
- Peter Prideaux (1651–1712), 2nd son, who was educated at Exeter College, Oxford and was later a Fellow of All Souls, Oxford. He died unmarried.
- John Prideaux (1655–1706) of Solden, Holsworthy, 3rd son, MP for Newport, Cornwall in 1700. He was educated at Exeter College, Oxford. He married firstly his cousin Anne Prideaux (d. 1703), daughter and heiress of Humphrey Prideaux of Soldon, and secondly to Katherine Kelland, daughter of John Kelland of Painsford and widow of John Coffin of Portledge, Alwington. He died childless.
- Roger Prideaux (1657–1685), 4th son, educated at Exeter College, Oxford

== Death, burial & monument ==
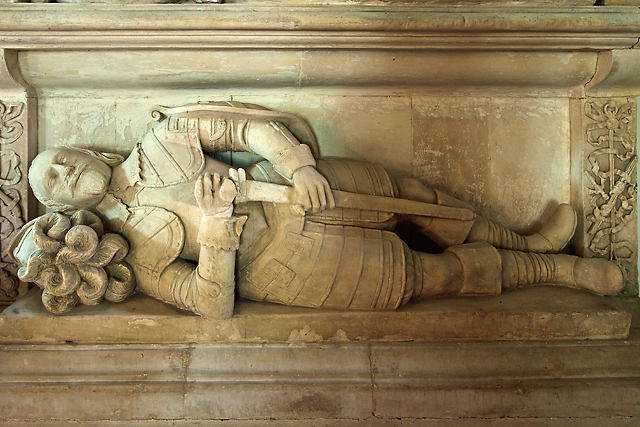
Monument of Sir Peter Prideaux in St. Michael's church

He died on 22 November 1705 and was buried two days later in St Michael's Church, Farway, where survives his mural monument.

Baronetage of England
Preceded by Peter Prideaux	Baronet (of Netherton); 1682–1705	Succeeded by Edmund Prideaux
