= Farway =

Village in Devon, England

Coordinates: 50.753708°N 3.160145°W

- Location within Devon
- OS grid reference: SY1825895543
- Shire county: Devon
- Region: South West
- Country: England
- Sovereign state: United Kingdom
- Post town: Colyton
- Postcode district: EX24
- Dialling code: 01297
- Police: Devon and Cornwall
- Fire: Devon and Somerset
- Ambulance: South Western
- UK Parliament: Honiton and Sidmouth

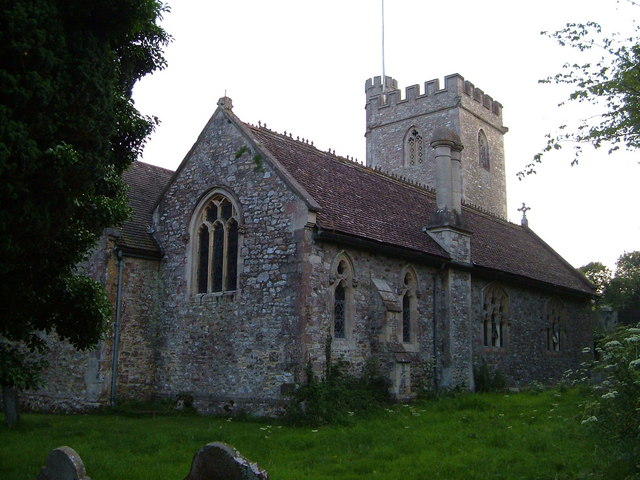
St Michael's Church, Farway

Farway is a small village, civil parish and former manor in the East Devon district of Devon, England. The village is situated about 3 1/2 miles (5.6 km) south-east of Honiton. The village lies on the River Coly, which rises in the north of the civil parish and which is crossed by a ford in the village.

The small parish church of St Michael has a tower with 13th-century north aisle arcade incorporating Norman piers. Features of interest include the Elizabethan communion table and various monuments. The bust to Humphrey Hutchins commemorates his rebuilding of part of the church in 1628; the monument to Sir Edmund Prideaux, 1st Baronet (d. 1628/29) of Netherton shows recumbent effigies of himself and his son.

== Historic estate ==
Netherton was long owned by the Prideaux family. The mansion house known as Netherton Hall was built in 1607 during the life of Sir Edmund Prideaux, 1st Baronet (d. 1628/29), though the part to the east is perhaps earlier in date. By the end of the 18th century it was quite ruinous and underwent a Victorian restoration in 1836–44. At this time the south wing which included the chapel was pulled down leaving the west and north wings. It was the birthplace of Edmund Prideaux (d. 1659), of Ford Abbey, MP.
