= Netherton, Farway =

Historic estate in Devon, England

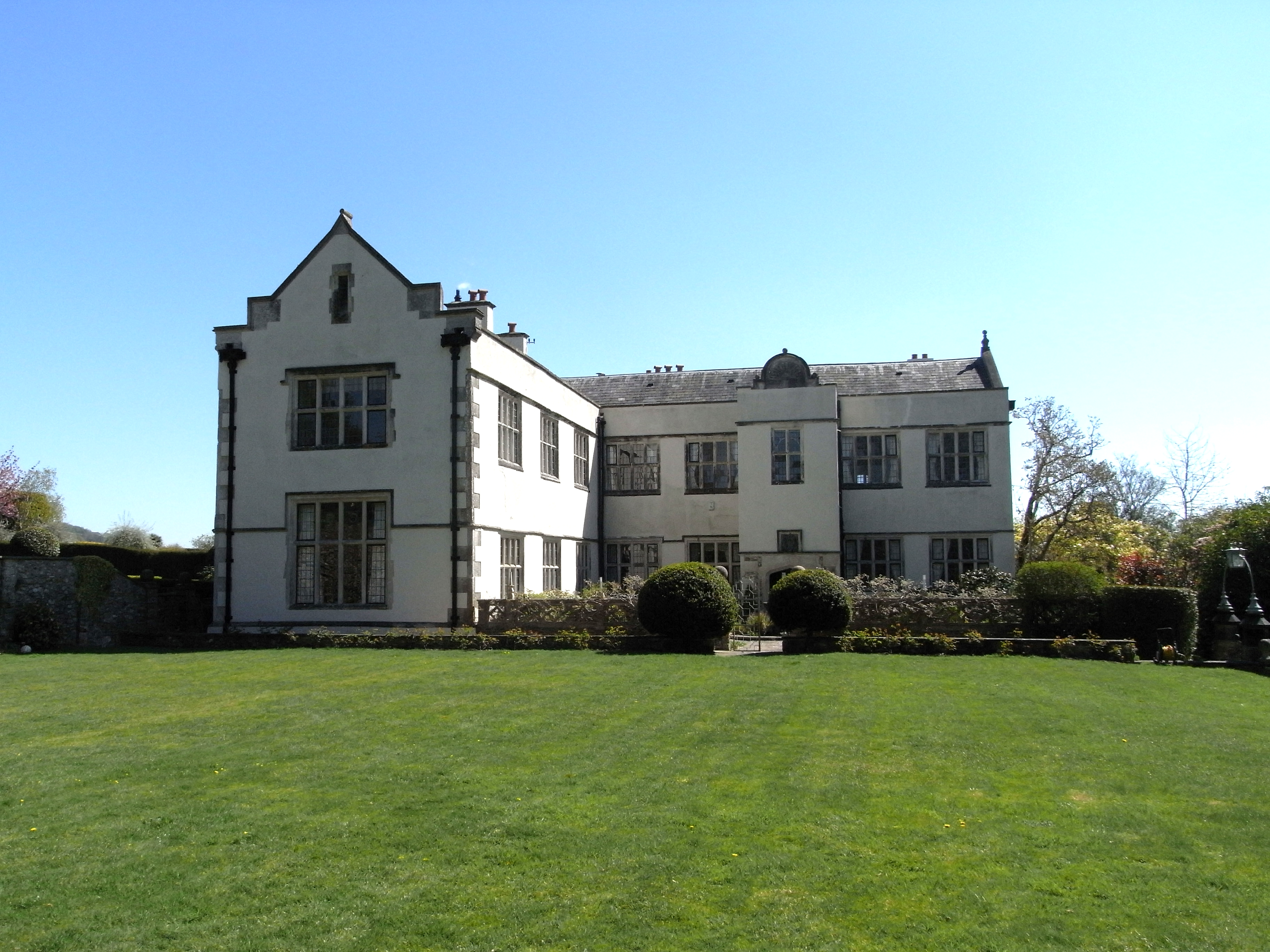
Netherton Hall, west front

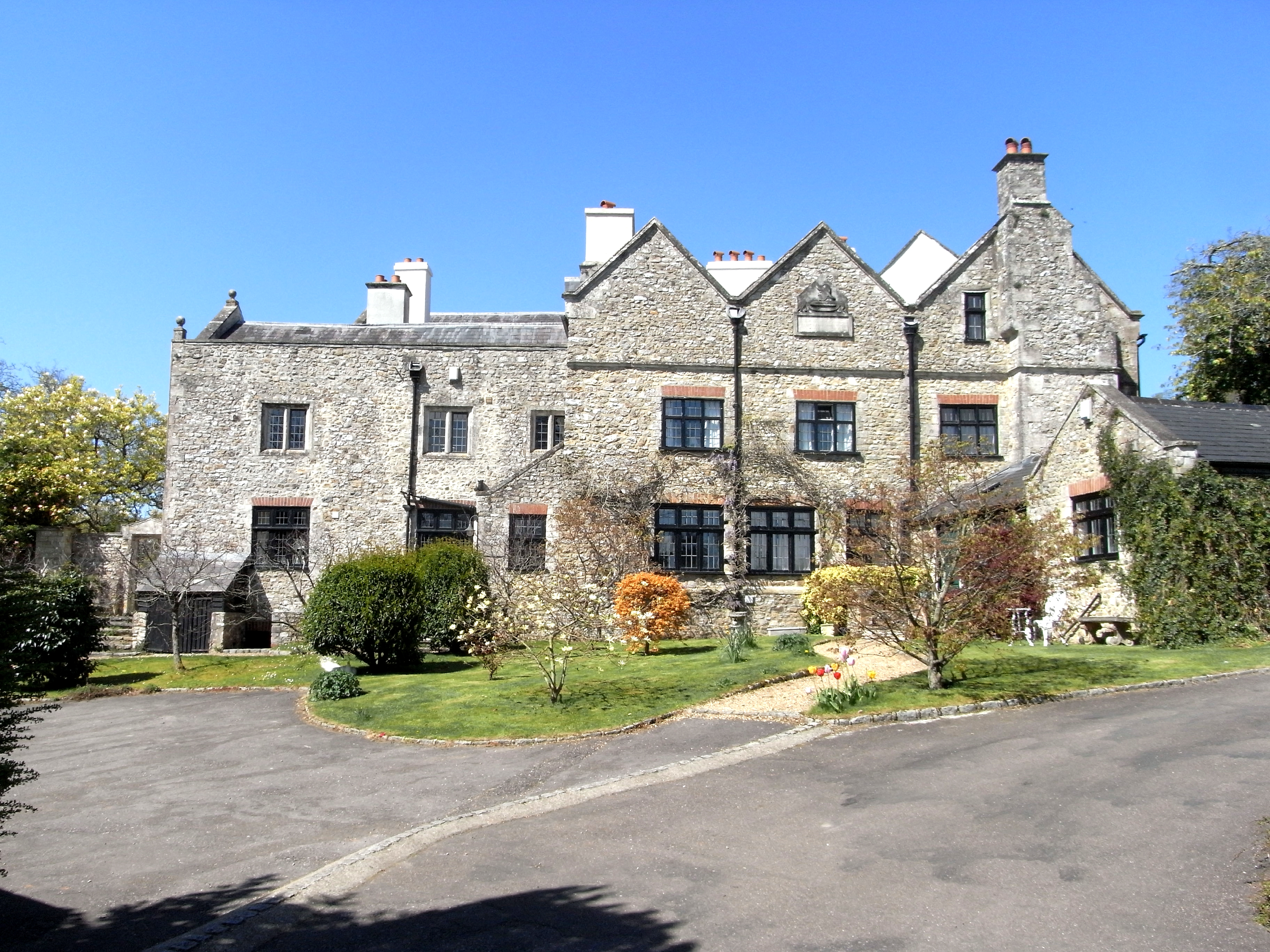
Netherton Hall, east front

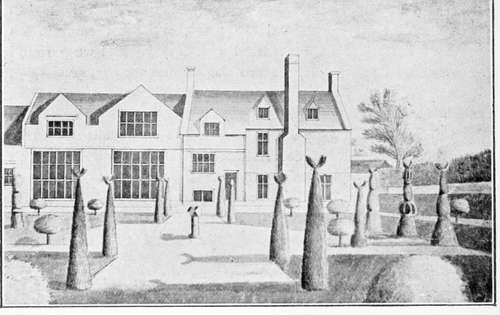
Netherton Hall in the parish of Farway, Devon. 1727 drawing by Edmund Prideaux (1693–1745) of Prideaux Place, Cornwall

Netherton in the parish of Farway in Devon is an historic estate situated about 3 1/2 miles south-east of Honiton. The present mansion house known as Netherton Hall was built in 1607 in the Jacobean style, restored and rebuilt 1836-44, and is a Grade II listed building.

== Descent ==
=== Canonsleigh Abbey ===
The estate of Netherton was a possession of Canonsleigh Abbey, Devon.

=== Drake ===
Following the Dissolution of the Monasteries it was sold by the crown to Sir Bernard Drake (c. 1537 – 1586) of Ash, Musbury, in Devon, who granted the grange to Mr Loman.

=== Prideaux ===
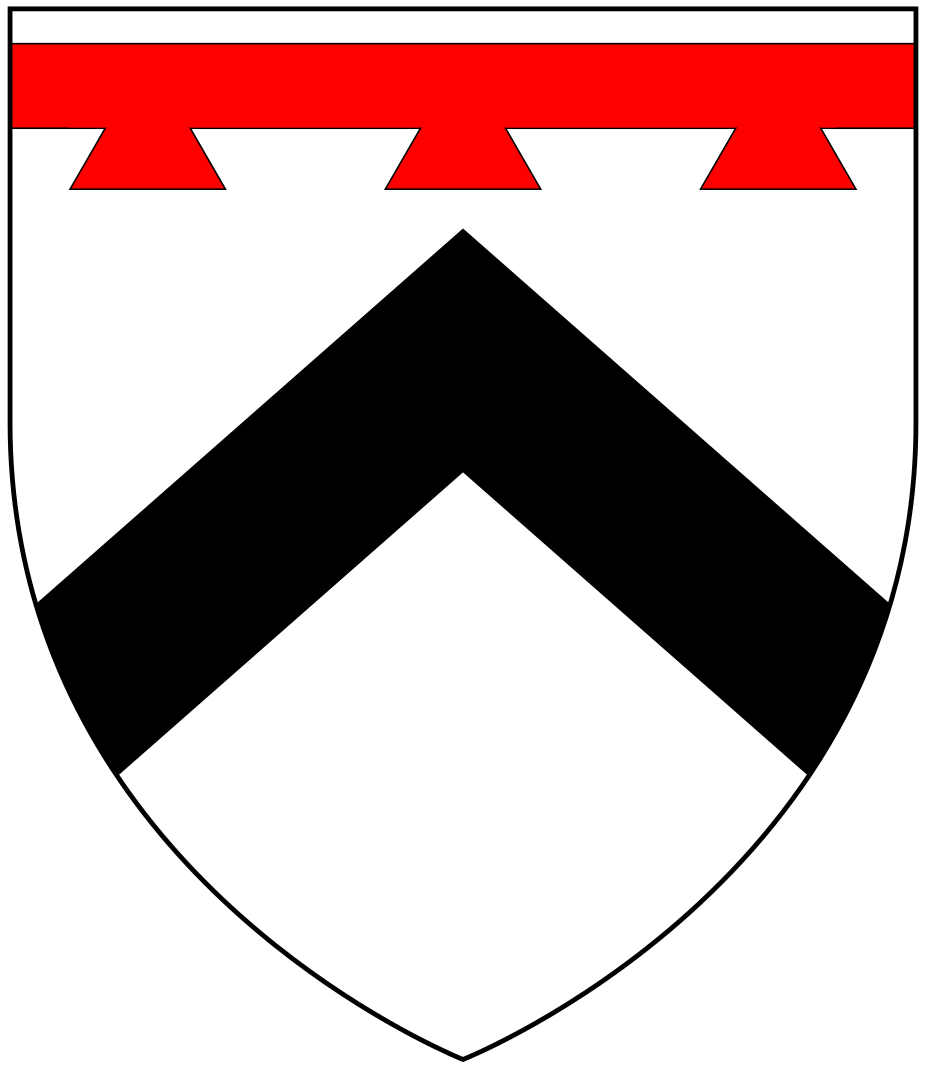
Arms of Prideaux: Argent, a chevron sable in chief a label of three points gules

The Prideaux family is believed to be of Norman origin and to have first settled in England at some time after the Norman Conquest of 1066 at Prideaux Castle, near Fowey, in Cornwall. It abandoned that seat and moved to Devon, where it spread out in various branches, most notably at Orcharton, Modbury; Adeston, Holbeton; Thuborough, Sutcombe; Solden, Holsworthy; Netherton, Farway; Ashburton; Nutwell, Woodbury and Ford Abbey, Thorncombe. Another branch built Prideaux Place in Cornwall in 1592, where it survives today. It was one of the most widespread and successful of all the gentry families of Devon, and as remarked upon by Swete (died 1821), exceptionally most of the expansion was performed by younger sons, who by the custom of primogeniture were expected to make their own fortunes.

==== Sir Edmund Prideaux, 1st Baronet (died 1628) ====
Sir Edmund Prideaux, 1st Baronet (died 1628), who purchased Netherton. He was a Councellor at Law and double reader of the Inner Temple and was created a baronet on 17 July 1622. He was the second son of Roger Prideaux (died 1582) of Soldon in the parish of Holsworthy, Devon, by his wife Phillippa Yorke (died 1597), daughter of Richard (or Roger) Yorke, Serjeant-at-Law, and widow of Richard Parker. Sir Edmund Prideaux with his newly married third wife Mary Reynell (died 1631) built a new mansion on the site in 1607, which date is inscribed atop the full-height porch, much of which survives in the present building. He was buried in St Michael's Church, Farway, where survives his monument showing his semi-recumbent effigy dressed in lawyer's robes, with effigy of his son below. He married three times:

- Firstly to Bridget Chichester, the seventh daughter of Sir John Chichester (1519–1569) of Raleigh in the parish of Pilton, North Devon. By his first wife he had one son Timothy Prideaux (born 1590, baptised at Holsworthy), who predeceased his father, and three daughters.
- Secondly to Catherine Edgcumbe, daughter of Piers Edgcumbe of Mount Edgcumbe in Cornwall, by whom he had children:
  - Sir Peter Prideaux, 2nd Baronet (1596–1682), of Netherton, eldest son and heir.
  - Sir Edmund Prideaux, 1st Baronet of Ford Abbey (died 1659) of Forde Abbey, second son, made a baronet by the Lord Protector Oliver Cromwell on 31 May 1658.
  - Mary Prideaux (1598–1612), died aged 14, buried at St Dunstan in the West, City of London.

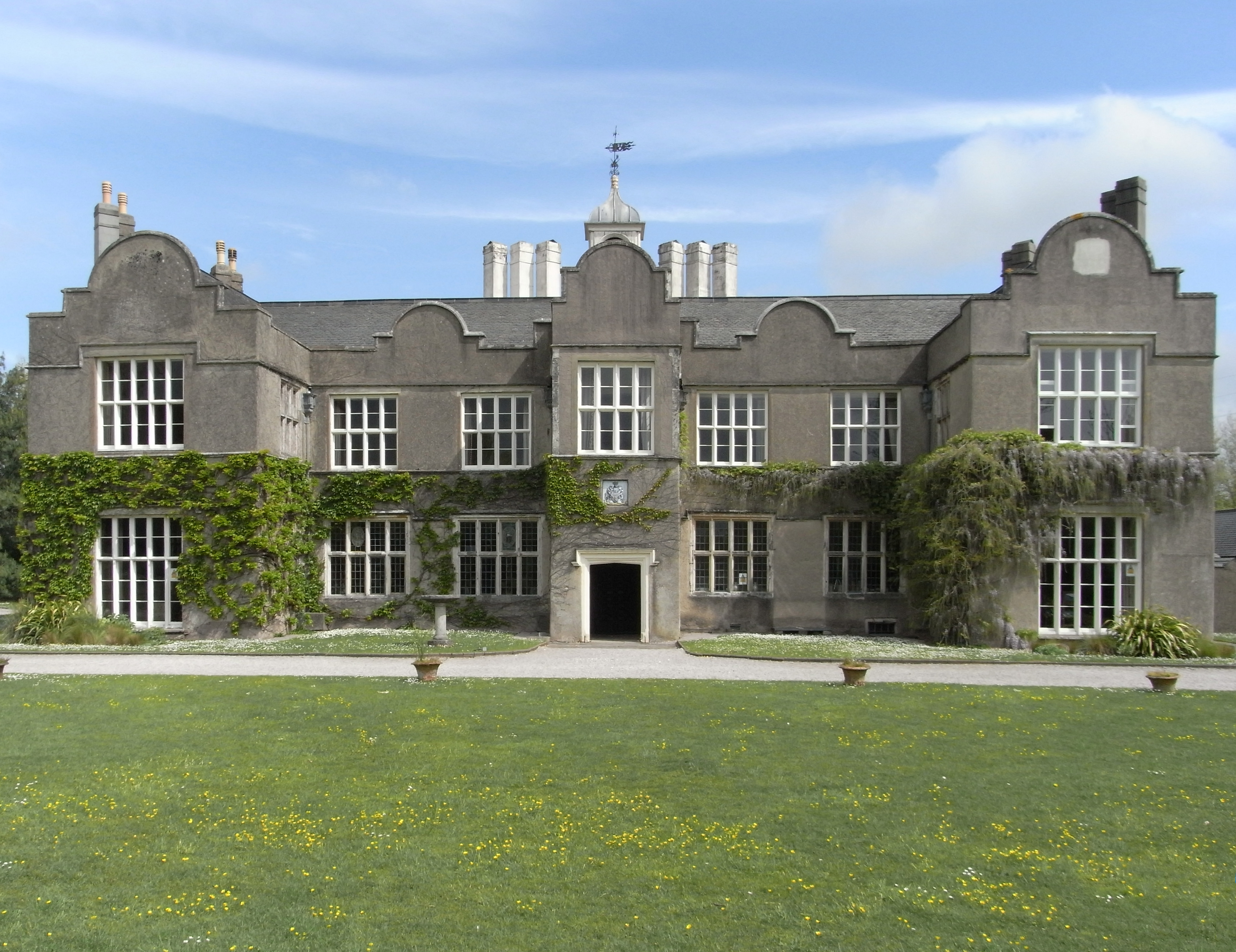
Ford House, Wolborough, built in about 1610 by Sir Edmund Prideaux's brother-in-law Sir Richard Reynell (died 1633), three years after the completion of Netherton House

- Thirdly in 1606 to Mary Reynell (died 1631), daughter of Richard Reynell (died 1585) of East Ogwell, Devon, Sheriff of Devon in 1585, and sister of Sir Richard Reynell (died 1633), Member of Parliament for Mitchell in Cornwall (1593), builder in 1610 of Ford House, Wolborough, and widow of Arthur Fowell (born 1552) of Fowellscombe, Ugborough, and mother of Sir Edmund Fowell, 1st Baronet (1593–1674). One year after his marriage to Mary Reynell he built Netherton Hall.

==== Sir Peter Prideaux, 2nd Baronet (1596–1682) ====
Sir Peter Prideaux, 2nd Baronet (1596–1682), eldest son and heir by his father's second wife Catherine Edgcumbe. He was MP for Honiton in 1661 and Sheriff of Devon in 1662. He married Susan Paulet (died 1673), daughter of Sir Anthony Paulet (1562–1600) of Hinton St George, Somerset, Governor of Jersey, and sister of John Poulett, 1st Baron Poulett (born c. 1585).

==== Sir Peter Prideaux, 3rd Baronet (1626–1705) ====
Sir Peter Prideaux, 3rd Baronet (1626–1705), 4th but eldest surviving son and heir. He was a Member of Parliament for Honiton, Devon, in 1661, for Liskeard, Cornwall, in 1661, and for St Mawes 22 June 1685. He married Elizabeth Grenville (died 1692), eldest daughter of Sir Bevil Grenville (1596–1643) lord of the manors of Bideford in Devon and Stowe, Kilkhampton in Cornwall and sister of John Granville, 1st Earl of Bath. He died on 22 November 1705 and was buried two days later in St Michael's Church, Farway, where survives his mural monument.

==== Sir Edmund Prideaux, 4th Baronet (1647–1720) ====
Sir Edmund Prideaux, 4th Baronet (1647–1720)

==== Sir Edmund Prideaux, 5th Baronet (1675–1729) ====
Sir Edmund Prideaux, 5th Baronet (1675–1729). His only son died in infancy and the baronetcy thus passed to his first cousin. His only daughter and heiress was Anne Prideaux (1718-1760) who married John Pendarvis Basset (1713–1739) of Tehidy in the parish of Illogan in Cornwall. Her husband died in 1739 and then her only son John Prideaux Basset (1740 (posthumous)-1756) died in 1756 aged 16, when the Basset estates passed to his uncle, Francis Basset (died 1769). From that time therefore she may have lost her residence at Tehidy and required alternative housing, when she purchased the palatial Haldon House in the parish of Dunchideock in Devon, from Sir John Chichester, 5th Baronet (1721-1784) (who had inherited it from his wife) and was resident there in 1758. She died in 1760, and appointed as trustees of her will her cousin Thomas Hawkins of Trewithen, and Rev. Thomas Carlyon of St. Just-in-Roseland. Her legatees included her cousin Charles Evelyn of Totnes, who assigned his inheritance in settlement of a debt to Samuel Squire, Bishop of St. Davids. Her husband was a member of the junior branch of the prominent Basset family of Umberleigh and Heanton Punchardon in North Devon. She (or her trustees) sold Haldon to John Jones, Esq., who sold Haldon to William Webber, Esq., who sold it to Sir Robert Palk, 1st Baronet.

==== Sir John Prideaux, 6th Baronet (1695–1766) ====
Sir John Prideaux, 6th Baronet (1695–1766)

==== Sir John Wilmot Prideaux, 7th Baronet (1748–1826) ====
Sir John Wilmot Prideaux, 7th Baronet (1748–1826). The house was in poor repair when visited in 1795 by the Devon topographer Rev. John Swete (died 1821), who made a watercolour sketch of it (studiously omitting a "modern mean wing which presents its gable-end" which he considered ugly) and recorded in his journal:

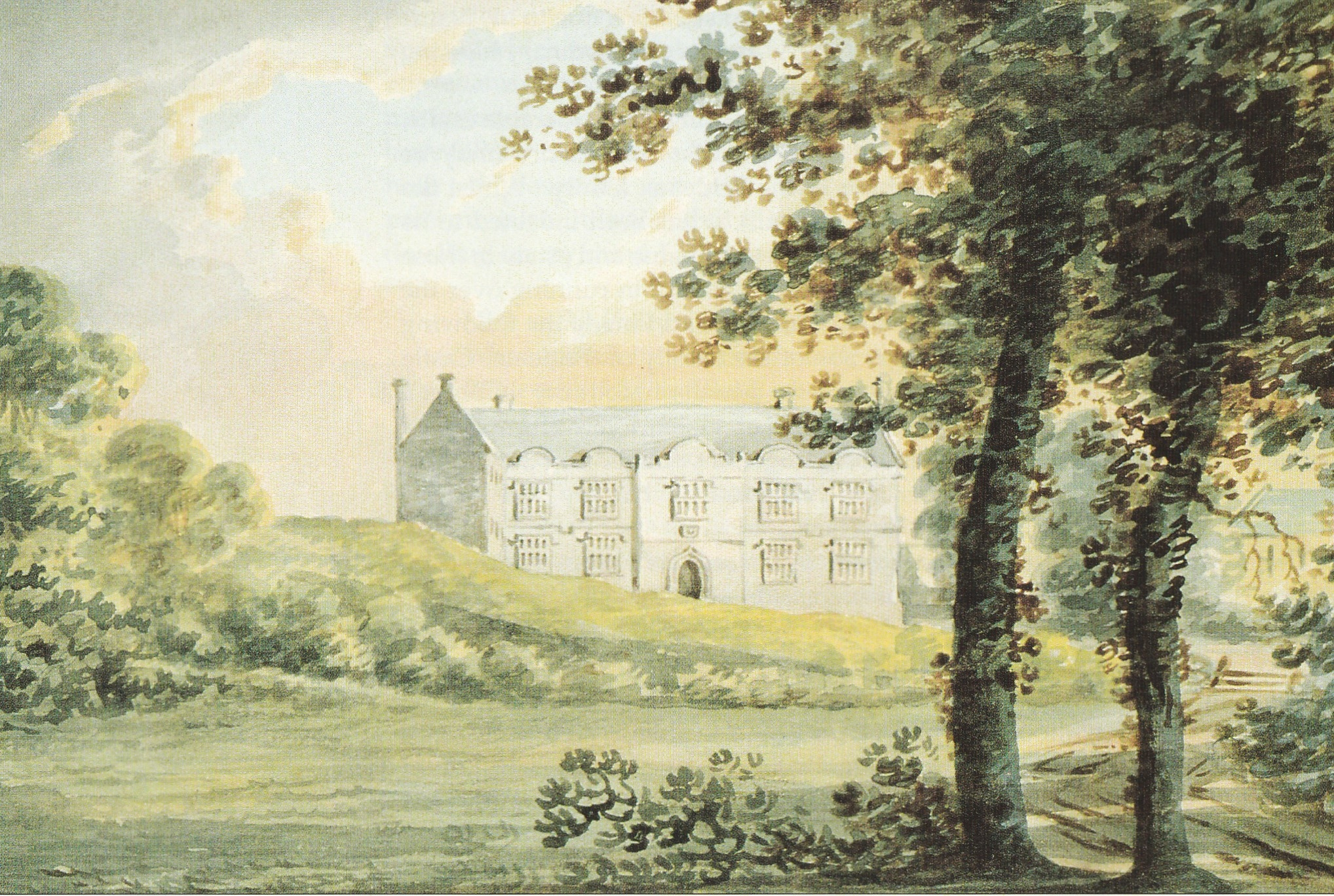
1795 watercolour of Jacobean front of Netherton Hall by Rev. John Swete (died 1821), inscribed: Netherton, seat of Sir Wilmot Prideaux, Bart. Collection of Devon Record Office. The style is similar to Forde House, Newton Abbot, circa 1610

"This fair house of Netherton which Sir Edmund Prideaux built, though no longer fair, is the place of residence of his lineal successor Sir Wilmot - and with him it bids fair to fall to the ground for the mansion and the family will probably perish together. They both totter and to neither is there a prop of support" ... "Surrounded by paltry offices and deserted gardens, its mullioned windows block'd up to save a trifling tax, and deprived of the groves that once overhung it, naked and forlorn, little is the consequence which it possesses, and for ever has it ceased to arrest the admiration of the traveller".

==== Sir John Wilmot Prideaux, 8th Baronet (1791–1833) ====
Sir John Wilmot Prideaux, 8th Baronet (1791–1833)

==== Sir Edmund Saunderson Prideaux, 9th Baronet (1793–1875) ====
Sir Edmund Saunderson Prideaux, 9th Baronet (1793–1875), brother. Between 1836 and 1844 he restored and rebuilt the house, using the services of the builder W. Lee. He died without surviving male children when the baronetcy became extinct.

=== Tuke ===
Netherton Hall was the home of Samuel Tuke (1854–1937), a member of the Tuke family of York, Quaker innovators involved in establishing Rowntree's Cocoa Works, The Retreat Mental Hospital and three Quaker schools, Ackworth, Bootham, and The Mount. He was born in Hitchin, Hertfordshire and died at Colwell, Honiton.

=== Granville-Barker ===
In 1919 the estate was purchased by the English playwright Harley Granville-Barker (1877–1946), and received visits from many prominent literary figures including George Bernard Shaw, T. E. Lawrence and Thomas Hardy.

=== Later owners ===
In 1955 the house was being used as a school. During the mid to late 1970s it was used as a school for "supposedly" maladjusted boys. Some did have behaver issues while others had been removed from mainstream education for being more advanced than the average child. From there, boys were mostly sent to Dawlish College once the age of 13 was reached. In 1968 it was the residence of Henry Hopkinson, 1st Baron Colyton of Farway (1902–1996), a diplomat and Member of Parliament for Taunton 1950-56. It was later restored and divided for multiple occupation. The main part of the house, including 4 bedrooms, 5 reception rooms, 4.35 acres of land with tennis court and swimming pool was sold in 2012 for an asking price of £1.5 million.

== Sources ==
- Risdon, Tristram (died 1640), Survey of Devon, 1811 edition, London, 1811, with 1810 Additions, p. 35
- Vivian, Lt.Col. J. L., (ed.) The Visitations of the County of Devon: Comprising the Heralds' Visitations of 1531, 1564 & 1620, Exeter, 1895, pp. 621–3, pedigree of Prideaux of Soldon and Netherton
