= Sir Edmund Prideaux, 4th Baronet =

British lawyer and politician

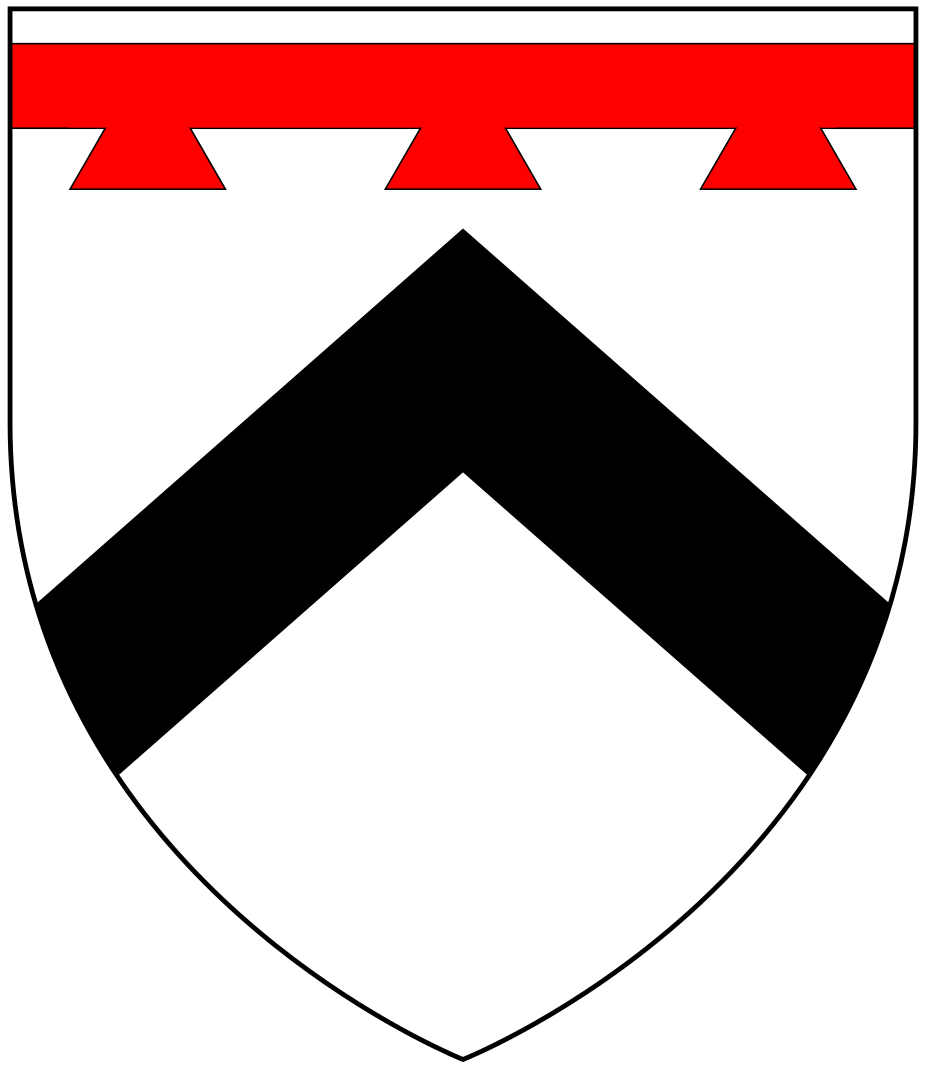
Arms of Prideaux: Argent, a chevron sable in chief a label of three points gules

Sir Edmund Prideaux, 4th Baronet (1647–1720), of Netherton, Farway was a British lawyer and politician who sat in the House of Commons from 1713 to 1720.

Prideaux was born on 4 April 1647, the eldest son of Sir Peter Prideaux, 3rd Baronet of Netherton and his wife Elizabeth Granville, daughter. of Sir Bevil Granville of Stowe, Cornwall. He matriculated at Oriel College, Oxford on 18 April 1663, aged 16 and was admitted at Inner Temple in 1667. In 1680, he was called to the bar. He married Susanna Austin, widow of John Austin of Derhams, Middlesex, and daughter. of James Winstanley of Branston, Leicestershire on 23 February 1673. They had two sons and a daughter, but she died in 1687. He then married Elizabeth Saunderson, daughter of Hon. George Saunderson of South Thoresby, Lincolnshire in about.1695 and had a son. She died in 1702. He succeeded his father in the baronetcy on 22 November 1705.

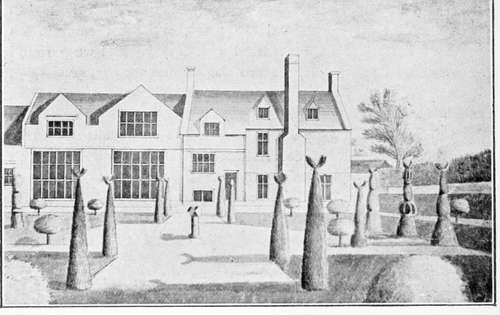
Netherton Hall in the parish of Farway, Devon. 1727 drawing by Edmund Prideaux (1693–1745) of Prideaux Place, Cornwall

Prideaux was High Sheriff of Cornwall for the year 1699 to 1700. By 1701 he received a commission as Deputy Lieutenant for Cornwall, which was confirmed on the accession of Queen Anne. In either 1708 or 1709 Lord Cowper added him to the Devon commission of the peace. He was stannator of Blackmore in 1710. In April 1713, he was appointed a justice in Cornwall. He was patron of the living of Tregony, whose incumbent exercised an important electoral influence in the borough. At the 1713 general election, he was returned as Member of Parliament for Tregony. In August 1714 his commission as a deputy-lieutenant in Cornwall was renewed.

Prideaux retained his seat at the 1715 general election and thereafter supported the Whig administration except on the Peerage Bill in 1719.

Prideaux married his third wife, Mary Rogers, widow of Sir John Rogers, 1st Baronet and daughter of Spencer Vincent of Wiscombe, Devon, on 5 September 1710. They had no issue Prideaux died on 6 February 1720 and was buried at Great Stanmore. He was succeeded in his estates and title by his eldest son Edmund.

Parliament of Great Britain
Preceded by Edward Southwell; George Robinson	Member of Parliament for Tregony; 1713–1720; With: James Craggs	Succeeded by Charles Talbot; James Craggs
Baronetage of England
Preceded by Peter Prideaux	Baronet (of Netherton); 1705-1720	Succeeded by Edmund Prideaux
