= Prideaux baronets =

Extinct baronetcy in the Baronetage of England

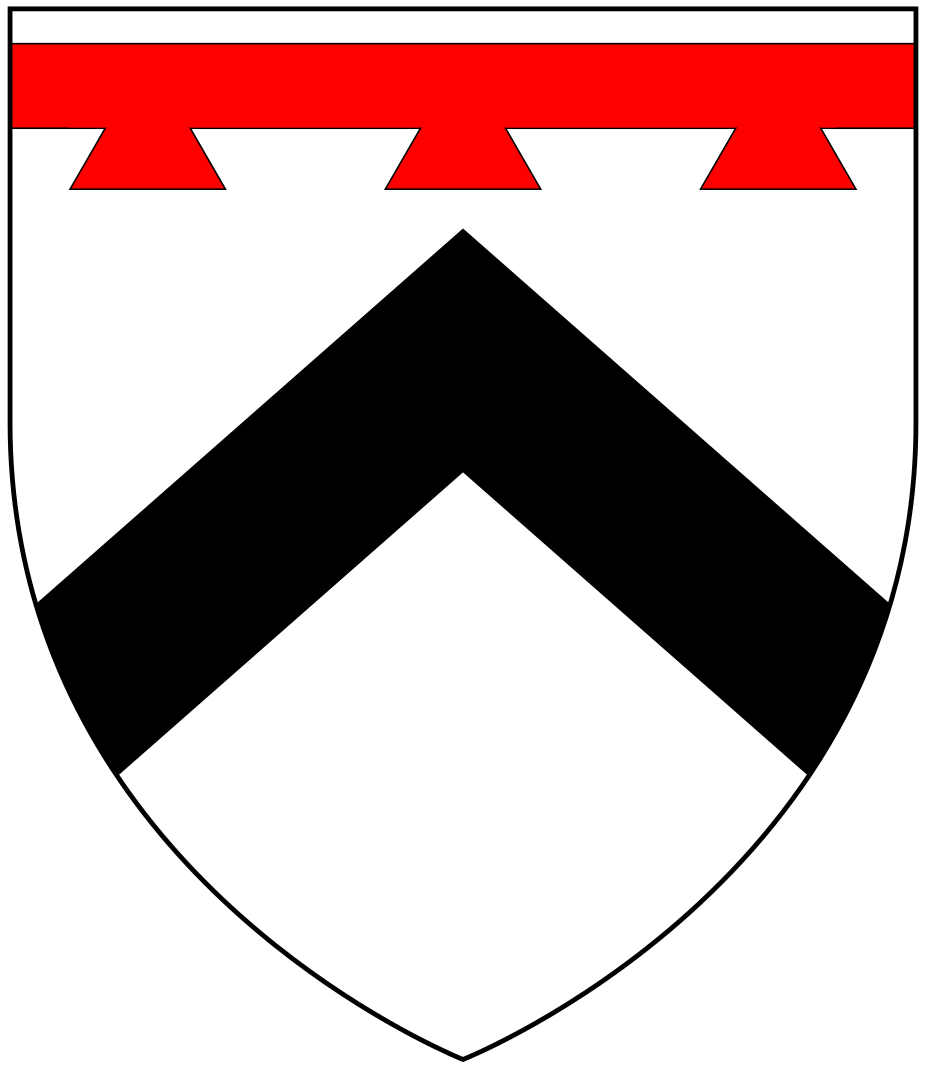
Arms of Prideaux: Argent, a chevron sable in chief a label of three points gules

The Prideaux Baronetcy, of Netherton in the County of Devon, was a title in the Baronetage of England. It was created on 17 July 1622 for Edmund Prideaux. The third Baronet sat as member of parliament for Liskeard and St Mawes. The fourth Baronet was member of parliament for Tregony. The title became extinct on the death of the ninth Baronet in 1875.

Two other members of the Prideaux family also gained distinction. Edmund Prideaux (died 1659), second son of the first Baronet, was a barrister and politician. John Prideaux, second son of the sixth Baronet, was a Brigadier-General in the British Army.

== Prideaux baronets, of Netherton (1622) ==
- Sir Edmund Prideaux, 1st Baronet (c. 1555–1629)
- Sir Peter Prideaux, 2nd Baronet (1596–1682)
- Sir Peter Prideaux, 3rd Baronet (1626–1705)
- Sir Edmund Prideaux, 4th Baronet (1647–1720)
- Sir Edmund Prideaux, 5th Baronet (1675–1729)
- Sir John Prideaux, 6th Baronet (1695–1766)
- Sir John Wilmot Prideaux, 7th Baronet (1748–1826)
- Sir John Wilmot Prideaux, 8th Baronet (1791–1833)
- Sir Edmund Saunderson Prideaux, 9th Baronet (1793–1875)

== Prideaux baronets, of Forde Abbey ==
- Sir Edmund Prideaux, 1st Baronet of Ford Abbey (died 1659) of Forde Abbey, the second son of the first Baronet of Netherton, was made a baronet by the Lord Protector Oliver Cromwell on 31 May 1658.
- Sir Edmund Prideaux, 2nd Baronet of Ford Abbey (1632–1702), son, MP for Taunton, who inherited the baronetcy on 19 August 1659, which title was held by him for less than a year, as it was sent into oblivion at the Restoration of the Monarchy in May 1660 and not renewed.
