= Richard Reynell (died 1633) =

British lawyer and politician

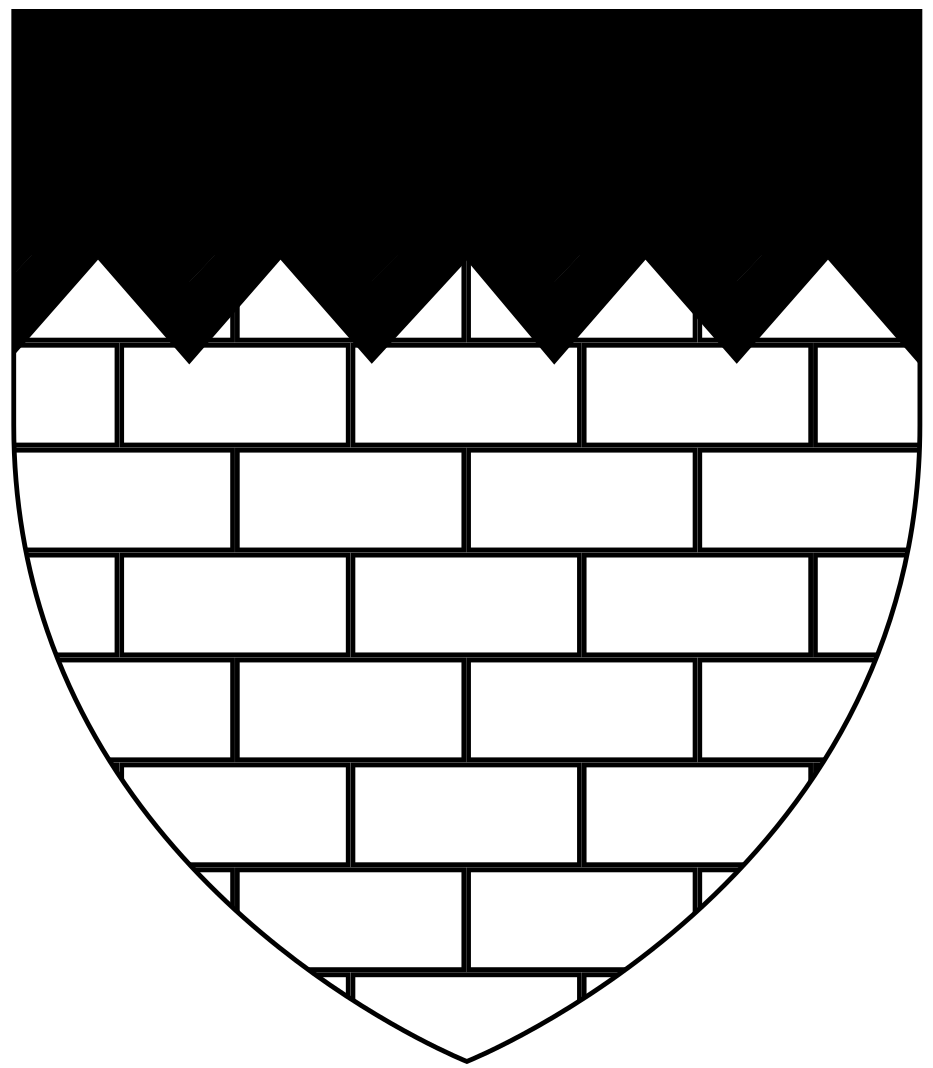
- Arms of Reynell: Argent, masonry sable a chief indented of the second

Member of Parliament for Mitchell
- In office 1593

Personal details
- Born: c. 1558 England
- Died: 1633 (aged 74–75)
- Spouse: Lucy Brandon (m. 1600)
- Children: 1
- Parent: Richard Reynell (father)
- Relatives: Carew Reynell (brother)

Sir Richard Reynell (c.1558–1633) of Forde in the parish of Wolborough, Devon, was an English lawyer and Member of Parliament. He built the surviving Ford House, now in the suburbs of Newton Abbot and his daughter and sole heiress Jane Reynell, married the Parliamentary general Sir William Waller.

== Origins ==
He was the third son of Richard Reynell (1519–1585) of East Ogwell in Devon.

== Career ==
Richard followed his two older brothers, Thomas and Josias, into the Middle Temple and in 1617 he was a barrister and Autumn Reader there. In 1593 he was probably Member of Parliament for the Cornish rotten borough of Mitchell together with Walter Raleigh. In the same year of 1593 he was a clerk in the office of the Lord Treasurer's Remembrancer and rose to the rank of senior sworn clerk, known as the "secondary". On 25 July 1622 he was knighted at Theobalds House.

== Purchase of Forde, Wolborough ==
At about the time of his marriage in 1600 he bought the estate of Forde in the parish of Wolborough, near Newton Abbot, Devon and immediately set about rebuilding the house. Forde House was visited by King Charles I in 1625 both on his way to and on his return from viewing the fleet at Plymouth. According to John Prince's The Worthies of Devon, published circa 1701:

"Unto this house, King Charles I, of gracious memory, came, attended on by the Duke of Buckingham, and other great lords, September, 15th 1625, and was pleased to take up his lodging there. The next day his majesty conferred the honour of knighthood in the dining room of that house, on Richard Reynell, of West Ogwell, and on Thomas Reynell, his brother, who at the time, was his majesty's servant, and sewer in ordinary, to his person, in presence of their wives and divers lords and ladies saying to them, "God give you joy!"

== Marriage and children ==
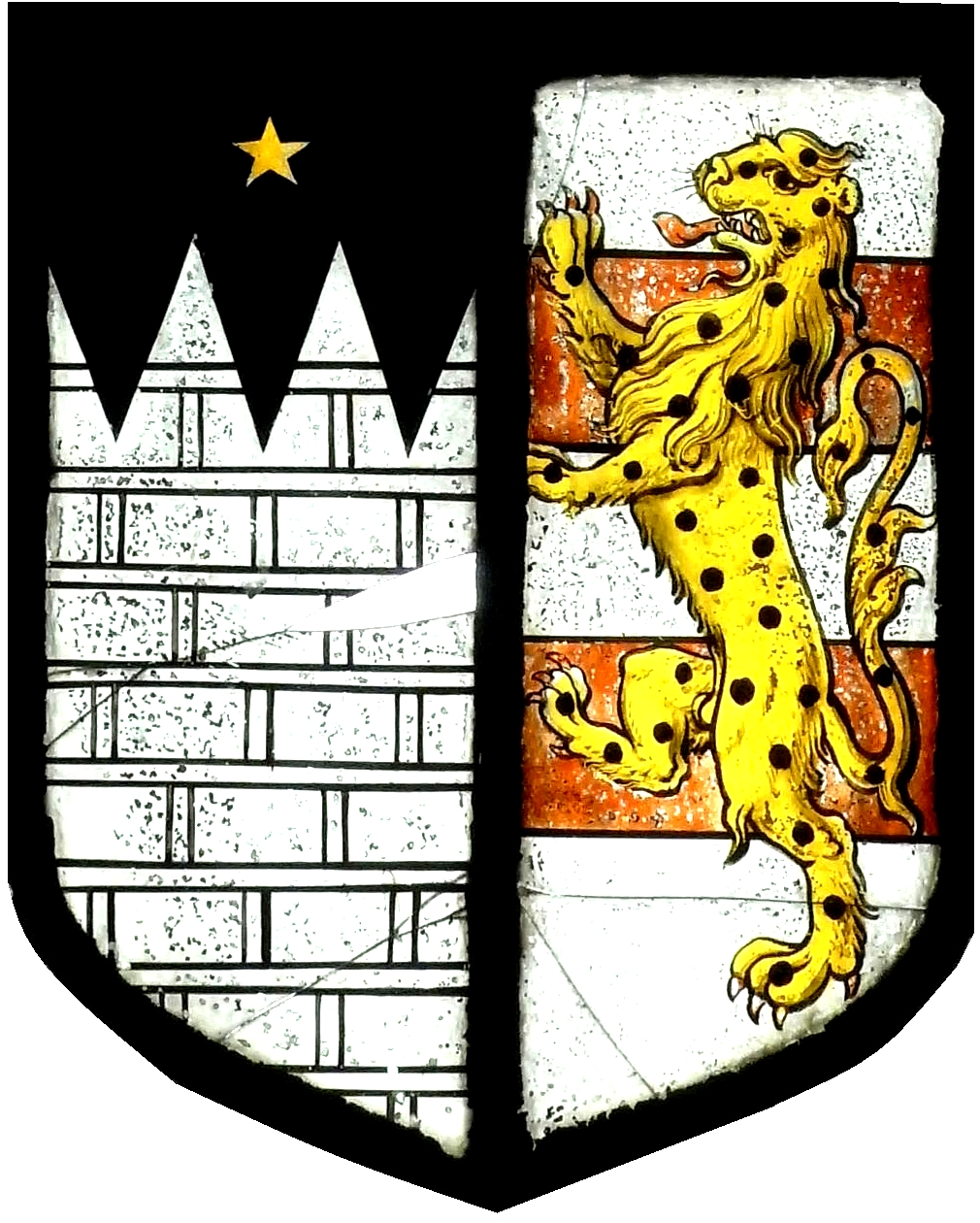
Stained glass heraldic escutcheon, Forde House, Wolborough, Devon: dexter: Argent, masonry sable a chief indented of the second a mullet or for difference (Reynell) impaling sinister: Argent two bars gules overall a lion rampant or pellety (Brandon). These arms represent the marriage between Sir Richard Reynell (d.1633), builder of Forde House, and Lucy Brandon

In 1600 he married Lucy Brandon, daughter of Robert Brandon (d.1591), member of the Goldsmiths' Company and Chamberlain of London. Lucy was the subject of a book The Life and Death of the Religious and Virtuous Lady, the Lady Lucie Reynell of Ford by her nephew Edward Reynell (published in 1654) which recorded that Richard Reynell had amassed a scholarly library, befitting a man notable for "depth of learning and tongues". The book also recorded his wife's strict manners, but also her charitable works, including her almshouses of 1640, the successors to which still exist in Newton Abbot. He had the following children:

- Jane Reynell, sole daughter and heiress, who in 1622 married the Parliamentary general Sir William Waller.

== Death and succession ==
Sir Richard died in 1633 and was buried on 25 January at Wolborough. He was survived by his wife Lucy Brandon who lived until 1652. His lands including Forde, were inherited by his granddaughter Margaret Waller (born 1633), the only surviving child of his daughter Jane Reynell, who married Sir William Courtenay, 1st Baronet (1628–1702) de jure 5th Earl of Devon of Powderham and had 19 children.

== Monuments ==
A splendid and costly marble monument with recumbent effigies of Sir Richard, his wife and daughter, exists in Wolborough Church, against the north wall of the chancel. Portraits of Sir Richard and his wife hang on the wall of West Ogwell house. His armorials are displayed in stained glass in one of the windows of Middle Temple Hall, and in a window of the hall in Forde House, impaling the arms of Brandon: Argent, two bars gules overall a lion rampant or pelletty
