= Forde House =

Historic manor in Devon, England

Coordinates: 50.5273°N 3.5957°W

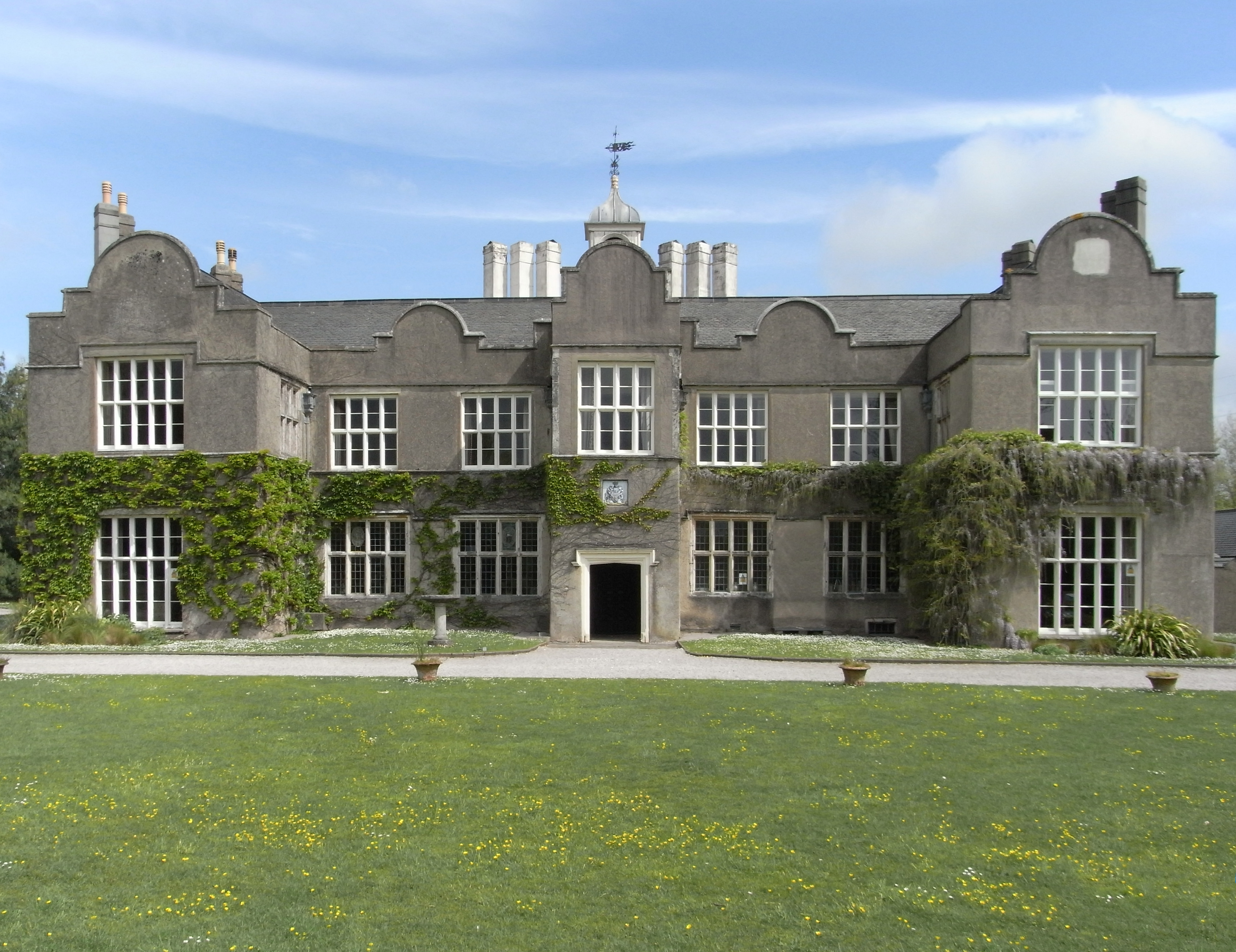
Old Forde House, south front

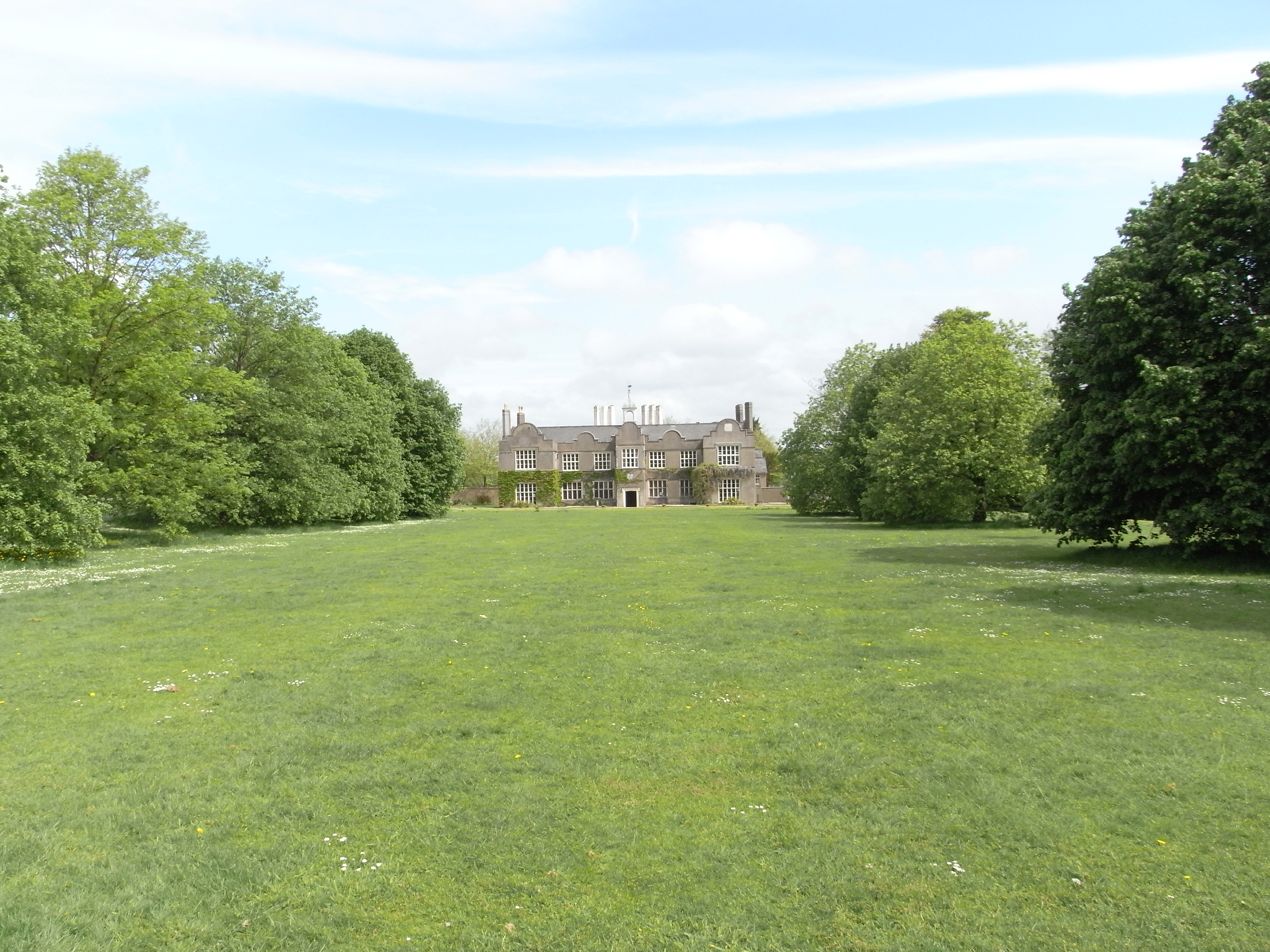
South front viewed from Torquay Road

Forde House, now known as Old Forde House, is a Grade I listed former manor house dating in back to c. 1550 in Newton Abbot, Devon, England. The building was substantially enlarged c. 1610 and is noted for its fine 17th-century wood-carving and plasterwork. Once the manor house of the parish of Wolborough, it is now absorbed into a suburb of Newton Abbot. The south front faces Torquay Road across the house's front lawn. The building was purchased in 1978 by Teignbridge District Council which then built itself a modern headquarters in the grounds which opened in 1987. The council offices now take the name Forde House, and the old mansion is known as Old Forde House.

== History ==
=== Reynell ===
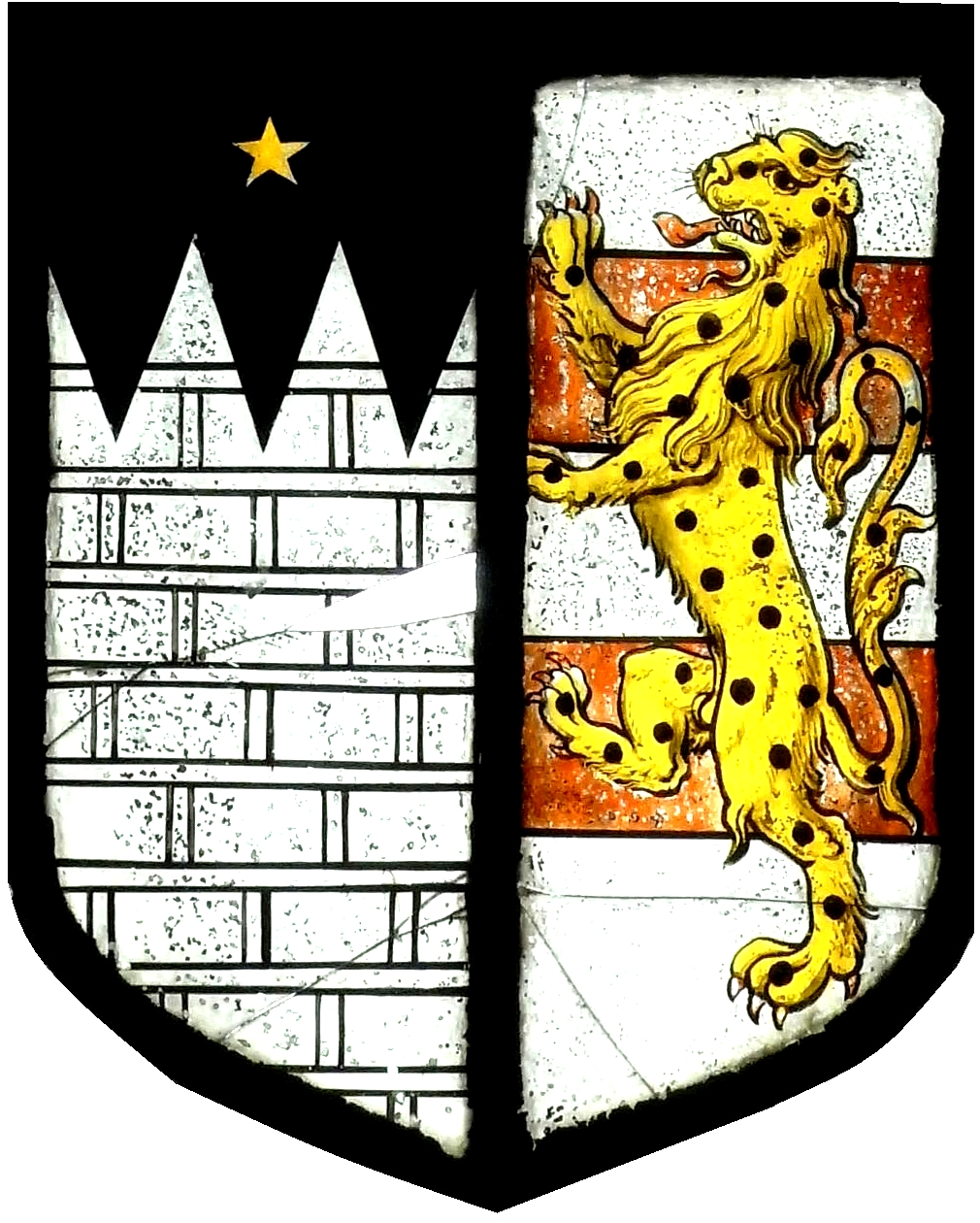
Stained glass heraldic escutcheon at Forde House: dexter: Argent, masonry sable a chief indented of the second a mullet or for difference (Reynell) impaling sinister: Argent two bars gules overall a lion rampant or pellety (Brandon). These arms represent the marriage between Sir Richard Reynell (d.1633), builder of Forde House, and Lucy Brandon

The present house was built around 1550. It was substantially enlarged and remodelled around 1610 for Sir Richard Reynell (d.1633), Member of Parliament for Mitchell in Cornwall (1593) and his wife Lucy Brandon. The house was built with an E-shaped floor plan, which may have been in honour of Queen Elizabeth I, who had recently died. The grounds were originally extensive, and included the whole of what is called Decoy (so named, because wildfowl were decoyed there to extend the house's larder), as well as a deer park.

On 15 September 1625 King Charles I stayed at the house overnight on his way to Plymouth, to inspect the fleet. He returned a few days later and stayed for a further two nights.

During the Civil War, Forde House gave shelter to Oliver Cromwell and Colonel Fairfax on 24 January 1646 before the second Siege of Exeter.

=== Courtenay ===
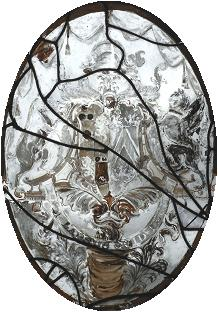
Stained glass at Forde House showing arms of William Courtenay, 1st Viscount Courtenay (1709–1762), (Courtenay quartering Redvers, Earl of Devon), impaling Finch: Argent, a chevron between three griffins passant sable (his wife was Lady Frances Finch (d.1761), daughter of Heneage Finch, 2nd Earl of Aylesford). Below is the Latin motto of Courtenay Ubi Lapsus quid feci ("Where have I slipped, what have I done")

In 1648 the estate passed to the Courtenay family via the marriage of Margaret Waller (d.1694), only daughter and heiress of Sir William Waller by his wife Jane Reynell, the heiress of Forde, to Sir William Courtenay, 1st Baronet (1628–1702), of Powderham Castle. Powderham Castle had been badly damaged during the Civil War and Forde became the Courtenay's principal residence. Both the 1st baronet and his wife Margaret Waller were buried at Wolborough.

William of Orange stayed at the house in 1688 on the way to his coronation in London, having landed in Brixham a few days earlier. The Courtenays soon moved back to a restored Powderham Castle, where in particular William Courtenay, 1st Viscount Courtenay (1711–1762), the great-grandson of Margaret Waller, effected a major remodelling. Forde House however remained a possession of the Courtenays until 1762 when the house was let to a succession of occupiers.

==== Tenants post 1762 ====
===== Wise =====
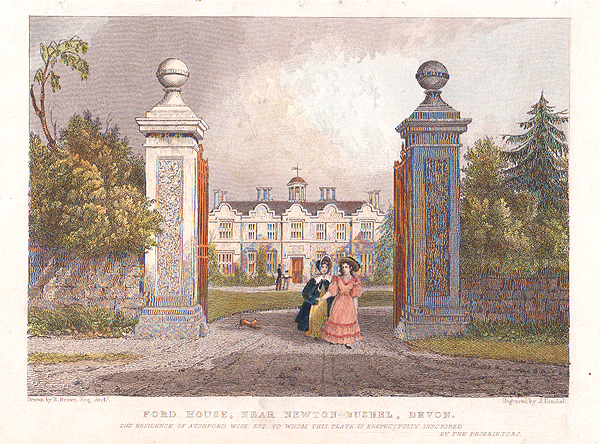
"Ford House near Newton Bushel, the residence of Ayshford Wise Esq."; Engraving by J. Henshall, circa 1835, after a painting by R. Brown. The gates no longer exist

In 1820 Forde House was let to Ayshford Wise (1786–1847), JP, DL and MP for Totnes 1812–1818, descended from the ancient Devon family of Wise of Sydenham House. His co-member for Totnes was Thomas Courtenay (d.1841), younger brother of William Courtenay, 10th Earl of Devon (1777–1859), of Powderham. The Wise family were lord of the manor of Little Totnes, and his father John Wise (1751–1807) of Wonwell was Recorder of Totnes from 1779 until his death and a partner in the "Totnes Bank", founded in about 1800 as Wise, Baker & Co. In 1817 the bank opened a new branch in Newton Abbot and in 1820 Ayshford Wise sold Wonwell and rented Forde House to be near his new premises. Later in the 1820s he sold his ancestral lands in Totnes to Edward Adolphus St Maur, 11th Duke of Somerset (1775–1855), of Stover House, who owned a great estate in and around Totnes the caput of which was Berry Pomeroy Castle. The bank failed in 1841.

=== Sellick ===
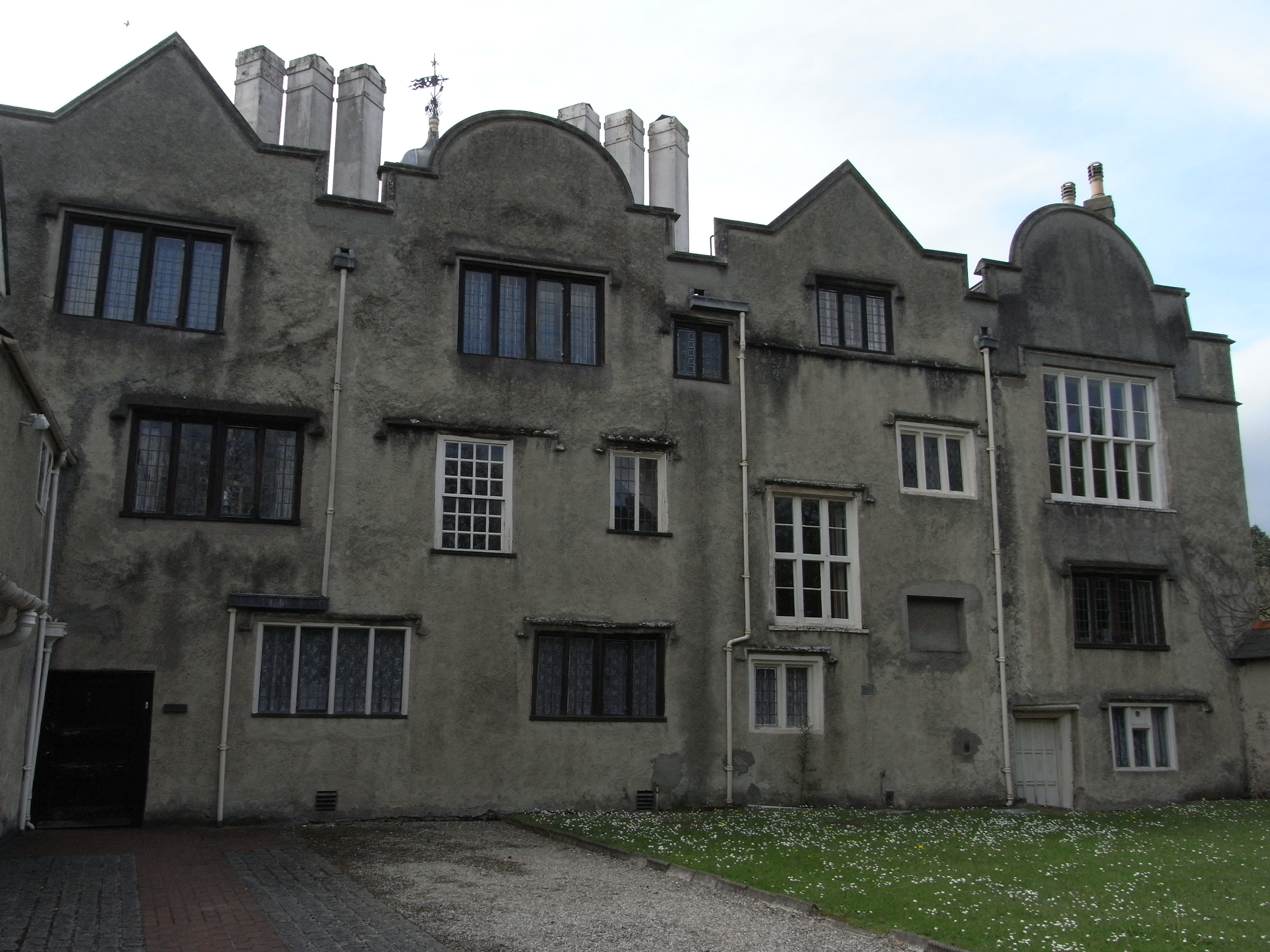
Forde House, rear (north) elevation

The Courtenay family sold the house in 1936 to Stephen Simpson, who sold it two years later to a Mrs M. Sellick who ran a business from it. In the 1950s she negotiated to convey the property to the National Trust, but the transaction was not completed.

=== Teignbridge District Council ===
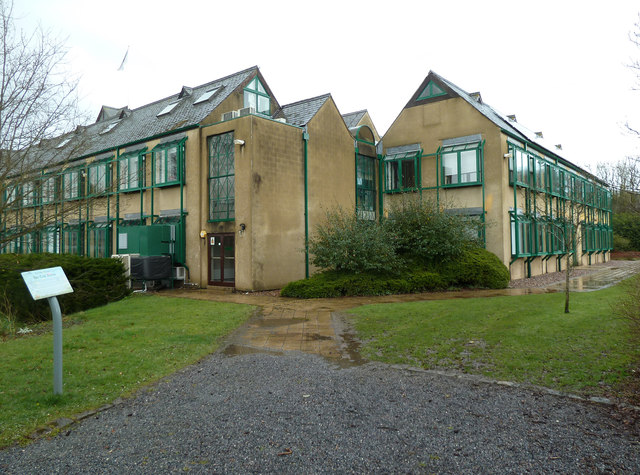
The modern Forde House offices built 1987 for Teignbridge District Council

Teignbridge District Council bought the house from the Sellick family in 1978 and remain the current owners. It has been refurbished by the council and is now used as office and conference space as well as being used for weddings and other events. A modern office building was built in the grounds to serve as the council's headquarters, being formally opened on 27 April 1987. The modern office now takes the name Forde House, with the old mansion renamed Old Forde House to distinguish it.

== Description ==
The main hall of the house is traditionally located to the west of the main entrance and has a notable plaster ceiling depicting sprays of several different flowers and fruits. The dining room, which was formerly the library, has a similarly decorated ceiling, as does the chairman's parlour, which also has a fine fireplace. The Long Room, also known as the Great Chamber, is on the first floor and is one of the best great chambers surviving in south west England.

Today, the house lies to the east side of the town of Newton Abbot, near the Penn Inn roundabout at the junction of the A380 and the A381 roads. Its former large grounds have been reduced to the front lawn between the house and Torquay Road.

== Sources ==
- O'Hagan, Mary (1990). A History of Forde House. Newton Abbot: Teignbridge District Council.
