= Wolborough =

Village in Devon, England

Coordinates: 50°31′31″N 3°37′01″W

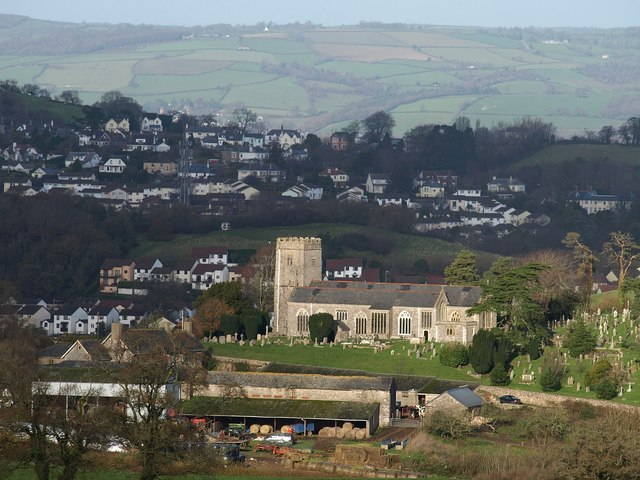
- St Mary's church, Wolborough

- Location within Devon
- Civil parish: Newton Abbot
- District: Teignbridge
- Shire county: Devon
- Region: South West
- Country: England
- Sovereign state: United Kingdom

Wolborough is a village and former civil parish, now in the parish of Newton Abbot, in the Teignbridge district, in the county of Devon, England. Today the village forms a southern suburb of the town of Newton Abbot.

The parish of Wolborough historically included the town of Newton Abbot. When district councils were established in 1894, Wolborough was included in the Newton Abbot Urban District. As a parish in an urban district Wolborough was classed as an urban parish and so was not given a parish council, instead being directly administered by Newton Abbot Urban District Council. The civil parish of Wolborough was eventually abolished on 1 April 1974 when the three parishes within Newton Abbot Urban District (Wolborough, Highweek and Milber) were united as a single parish called Newton Abbot within the new Teignbridge district. In 1951 the parish had a population of 8517.

In the 2020s there are plans to expand the settlement with 1,100 homes and supporting infrastructure.
