= Humphrey Prideaux =

British clergyman and Dean of Norwich

- Dean of Norwich
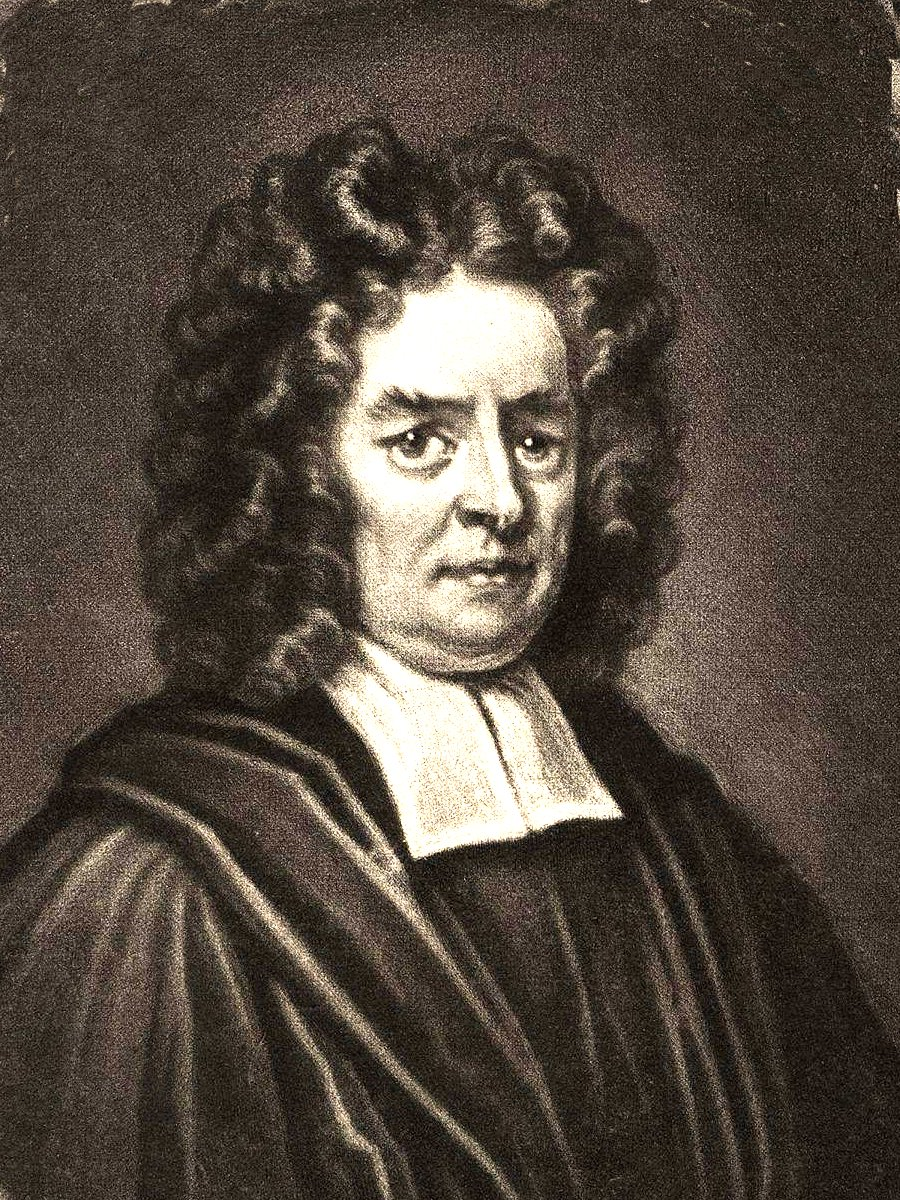
- Church: Church of England
- Diocese: Diocese of Norwich
- In office: 1702-1714

Personal details
- Born: 3 May 1648
- Died: 1 November 1724 (aged 76)
- Education: Westminster School London; Liskeard Grammar School

Humphrey Prideaux (3 May 1648 – 1 November 1724) was a Cornish churchman and orientalist, Dean of Norwich from 1702. His sympathies inclined to Low Churchism in religion and to Whiggism in politics.

== Life ==
The third son of Edmond Prideaux, he was born at Padstow, Cornwall, on 3 May 1648. His mother was a daughter of John Moyle. After education at Liskeard grammar school and Bodmin grammar school, he went to Westminster School under Richard Busby, recommended by his uncle William Morice. On 11 December 1668 he matriculated at Christ Church, Oxford, where he had obtained a studentship. He graduated B.A. 22 June 1672, M.A. 29 April 1675, B.D. 15 November 1682, D.D. 8 June 1686. In January 1674, Prideaux recorded in his letters a visit to his home of William Levett; with Levett came Lord Cornbury, son of the Earl of Clarendon, Levett's principal patron. In other letters, Prideaux mentioned alliances with Levett in ongoing church political manoeuvrings. At the university he was known for scholarship; John Fell employed him in 1672 on an edition of Florus. He also worked on Edmund Chilmead's edition of the chronicle of John Malalas.

Prideaux gained the patronage of Heneage Finch, 1st Earl of Nottingham, as tutor to his son Charles, and in 1677 he obtained the sinecure rectory of Llandewy-Velfrey, Pembrokeshire. In 1679 Finch presented him to the rectory of St Clement's, Oxford, which he held till 1696. He was appointed also, in 1679, Busby's Hebrew lecturer in Christ Church College. Finch gave him in 1681 a canonry at Norwich, and Sir Francis North in February 1683 presented him to the rectory of Bladon, Oxfordshire, which included the chapelry of Woodstock. He retained his studentship at Christ Church, where he was acting as unsalaried librarian.

Prideaux married and left Oxford for Norwich, ahead of James II's appointment (October 1686) of John Massey, a Roman Catholic, as Dean of Christ Church. He exchanged (1686) Bladon for the rectory of Saham-Toney, Norfolk, which he held till 1694. He engaged in controversy with Roman Catholics, especially on the point of the validity of Anglican orders. As canon of Norwich he improved the financial arrangements of the chapter, and put the records in order. In December 1688 he was made archdeacon of Suffolk by his bishop William Lloyd, an office which he held till 1694. While Lloyd became a nonjuror, Prideaux exerted himself at his archidiaconal visitation (May 1689) to secure the taking of the oaths; out of three hundred parishes in his archdeaconry only three clergymen became nonjurors. At the Convocation which opened on 21 November 1689 Prideaux was an advocate for changes in the Book of Common Prayer, with a view to the comprehension of Dissenters. Subsequently he officially corrected a lax interpretation of the Toleration Act 1688, as though it exempted from the duty of attendance on public worship. Gilbert Burnet consulted him in 1691 about a measure for prevention of pluralities, and Prideaux drafted a bill for this purpose. Richard Kidder consulted him in the same year about a bill for preventing clandestine marriages.

From 1689 to 1694 Prideaux resided at Saham. He declined in 1691 the Oxford Hebrew chair vacated by the death of Edward Pococke, a step which he afterwards regretted. Saham did not suit his health, and he returned to Norwich. In a letter written on 28 November 1694 after receiving the news of John Tillotson's death, he said that he had no expectations of future advancement. Early in 1697 he was presented to the vicarage of Trowse, near Norwich, a chapter living, which he held till 1709. He succeeded Henry Fairfax as dean of Norwich, and was installed on 8 June 1702. On the translation to Ely (31 July 1707) of John Moore, Prideaux recommended the appointment of Charles Trimnell, his fellow canon, as bishop.

In 1721 Prideaux gave his collection of oriental books to Clare Hall, Cambridge. From about 1709 he had suffered severely from the stone, which prevented him from preaching. An operation was badly managed; attacks of rheumatism and paralysis reduced his strength. He died on 1 November 1724, at the deanery, Norwich, and was buried in the nave of the Norwich Cathedral, where there was a stone to his memory, with an epitaph composed by himself.

== Works ==
Among his other works were a Life of Mahomet (1697), with a polemical tract against the deists. Its scholarship depended in particular on Pococke. It was criticised by George Sale, in his notes to his translation of the Quran. Its year-of-publication reprint was followed by a third, and a fourth; and four further editions between 1712 and 1718, and yet another reprint in 1723.

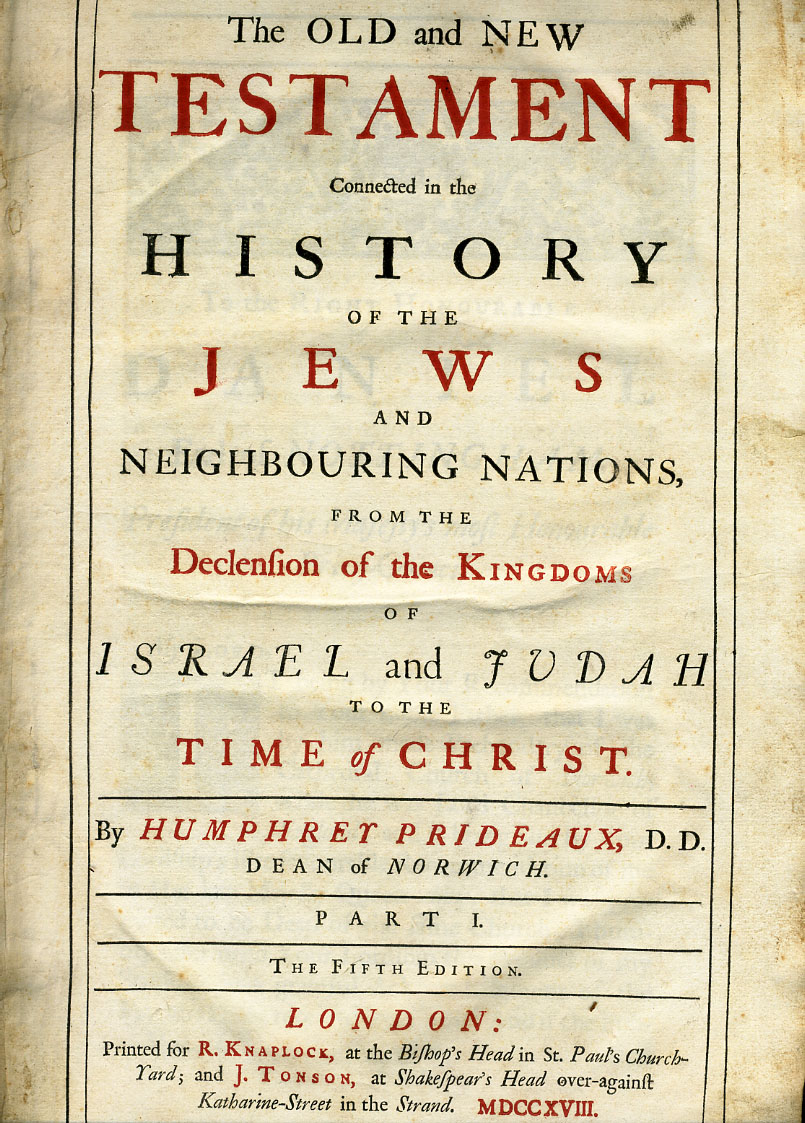
The Old and New Testament connected, title page to fifth edition of 1718.

The Old and New Testament connected in the History of the Jews and Neighbouring Nations (1715–17) was a significant work, of which many editions were brought out; it drew on James Ussher. It was among the earliest English works to use the term Vulgar Era, though Kepler used the term as early as 1635. It covered the historical interval between the Old and New Testaments, and led to a controversy between Prideaux and his cousin, Walter Moyle. Jean Le Clerc wrote a critical examination of it, which was published in English in 1722. The French translation was by Moses Solanus and Jean-Baptiste Brutel de la Rivière.

He published the following pamphlets: The Validity of the Orders of the Church of England (1688), Letter to a Friend on the Present Convocation (1690), The Case of Clandestine Marriages stated (1691). Other works were:

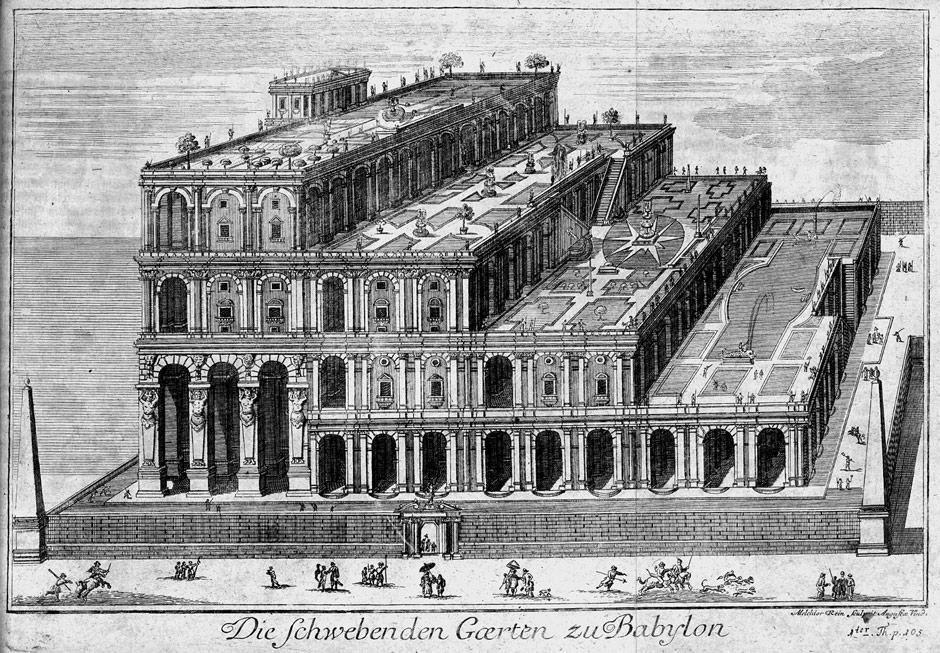
The Hanging Gardens of Babylon, engraving from the German edition of 1726 of The Old and New Testament connected.

- Marmora Oxoniensia, &c., Oxford, 1676, a catalogue and chronology of the Arundel marbles and related collections; the numerous typographical errors were ascribed to the carelessness of Thomas Bennet as corrector of the press. There were later editions, by Michael Maittaire and Richard Chandler.
- De Jure Pauperis et Peregrini, &c., Oxford, 1679, (edition of the Hebrew of Maimonides, with a Latin version and notes).
- A Compendious Introduction for Reading ... Histories, &c., Oxford, 1682.
- Directions to Churchwardens, &c., Norwich, 1701; 7th edition, 1730.
- The Original and Right of Tithes, &c., Norwich, 1710; reprinted 1713; 1736.
- Ecclesiastical Tracts, &c., 1716.

His letters (1674–1722) to John Ellis were edited for the Camden Society in 1875 by Edward Maunde Thompson.

== Marriage and children ==
On 16 February 1686 Prideaux married Bridget Bokenham, only child of Anthony Bokenham of Helmingham, Suffolk, and left a son:

- Edmund Prideaux (1693–1745) of Prideaux Place, Padstow, Cornwall, a lawyer of the Middle Temple and a talented amateur architectural artist.
