= Prideaux Place =

Country house in Padstow, Cornwall, England

- Plas Prideaux (Cornish)
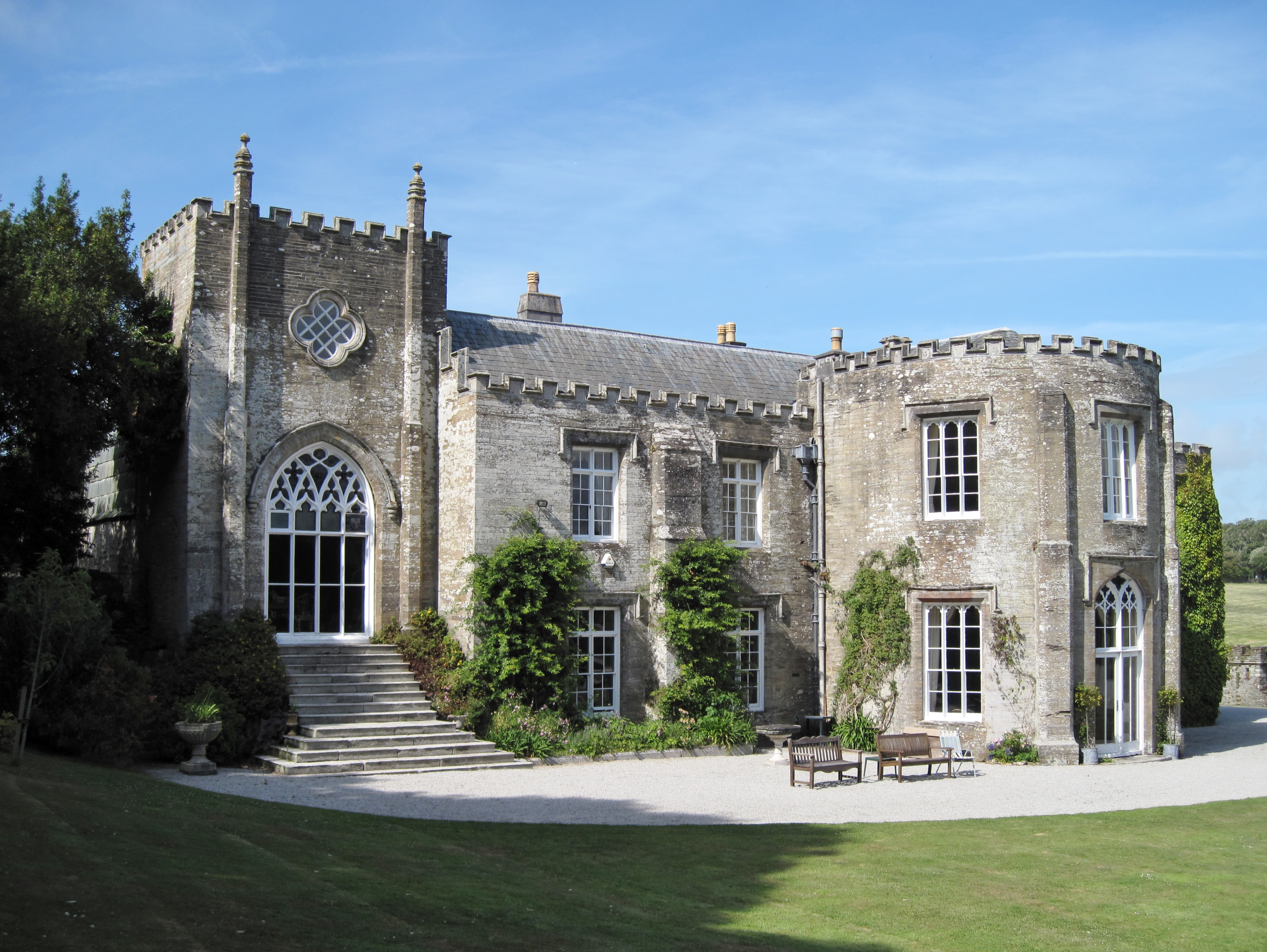
- South front, remodelled c. 1810–33 in Strawberry Hill Gothic style

- Location within Cornwall
- 50.54265°N 4.94601°W
- Location: Padstow, Cornwall, England

Listed Building – Grade I
- Designated: 24 April 1953
- Reference no.: 1212008

National Register of Historic Parks and Gardens
- Designated: 22 November 1992
- Reference no.: 1001249

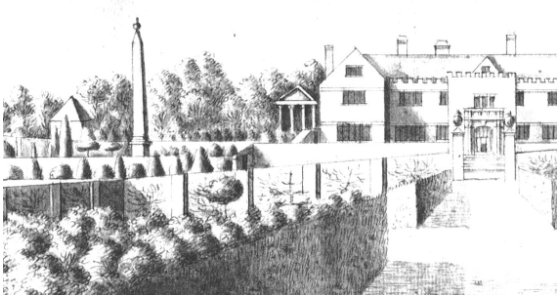
Prideaux Place, east front, detail of 1741 drawing by Edmund Prideaux

Prideaux Place (Cornish: Plas Prideaux) is a grade I listed Elizabethan country house in the parish of Padstow, Cornwall, England. It has been the home of the Prideaux family for over 400 years. The house was built in 1592 by Sir Nicholas Prideaux (1550–1627), a distinguished lawyer, and was enlarged and modified by successive generations, most notably by his great-great-grandson Edmund Prideaux (1693–1745) and by the latter's grandson Rev. Charles Prideaux-Brune (1760–1833). The present building, containing 81 rooms, combines the traditional E-shape of Elizabethan architecture with the 18th-century exuberance of Horace Walpole’s Strawberry Hill Gothic.

The house contains a fine collection of works of art, including royal and family portraits, fine furniture and the Prideaux Porcelain Collection. The recently uncovered ceiling in the Great Chamber is a masterpiece of the art of the Elizabethan plasterer. In 1968 the estate comprised about 3,500 acres, excluding the St Breock estate situated about ten miles away, also in the family's ownership, inherited from the Viell family in the 17th century. The deer park is one of the most ancient in England, containing in 1968 about 100 fallow deer, increased from only about six in 1946 following World War II.

== History ==
Until the Dissolution of the Monasteries in the 16th century, the manor of Padstow, within which was later established the manor of Prideaux Place, was held by Bodmin Priory. Having foreseen King Henry VIII's intention to dissolve religious houses, Prior Thomas Mundy made plans to place the assets of his priory beyond the king's reach, which he did by granting to his friends and relations at nominal ground-rents long leases of the priory's possessions. The manor of Padstow he leased for 99 years at an annual rent of £10 to his niece Johanna Mundy and her husband, William Prideaux (died 1564) of Trevose, St Merryn, Cornwall, a younger son of Humphrey Prideaux (1487–1550) of Theuborough, the latter who together with his lawyer brother Nicholas Prideaux (died 1560), had acted as business adviser to the prior. Bodmin Priory was surrendered to the crown by the prior in 1539.

The freehold of Padstow was obtained by Nicholas Prideaux (died 1560), by the artificial transaction of William Prideaux (died 1564) conveying the lease to a third party, John Pope of London, for the sum of £1,550, who then obtained a royal licence to alienate it to Nicholas Prideaux (died 1560), for sum unstated in the deed of sale. By tradition it is said that the Prideaux family viewed their obtaining of the estate at a favourable price as compensation for "an unpleasant wife", namely the prior's niece.

=== Prideaux ===
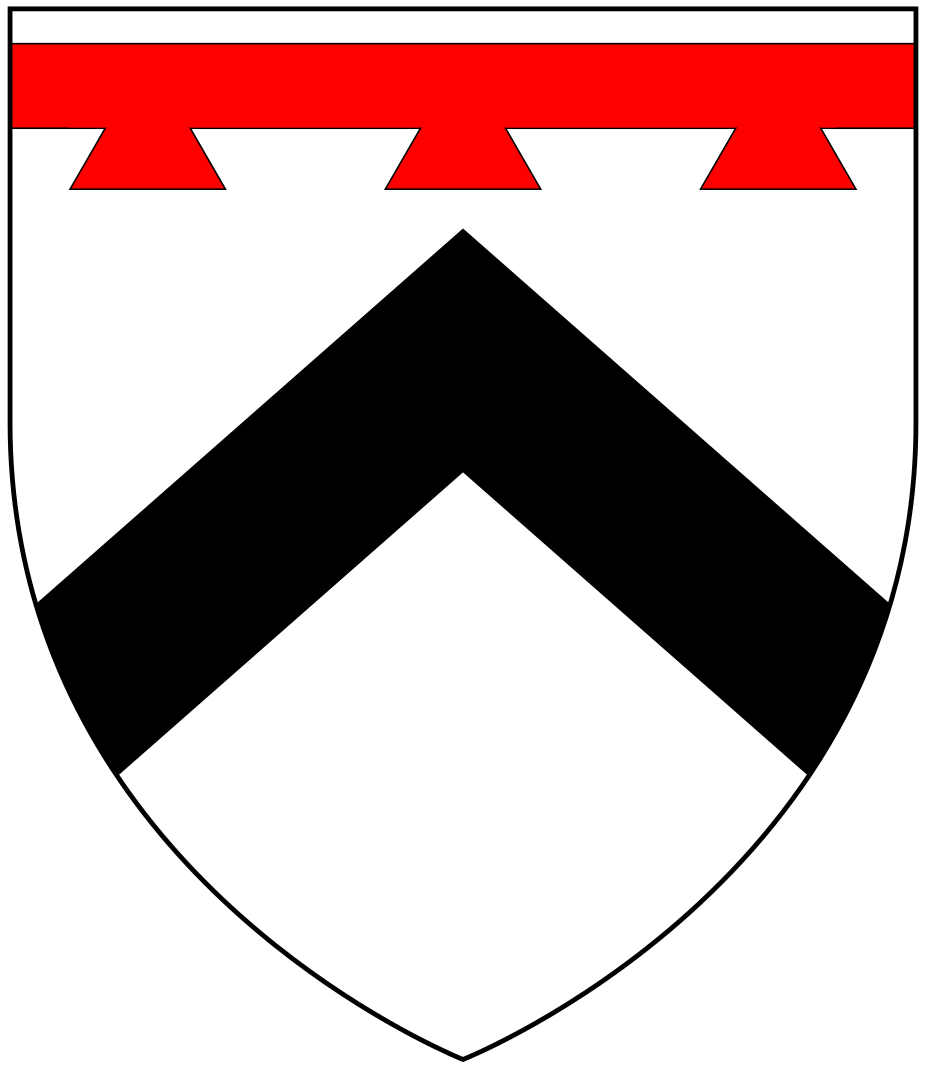
Arms of Prideaux

The Prideaux family is believed to be of Norman origin and to have first settled in England at some time after the Norman Conquest of 1066 at Prideaux Castle, near Fowey, in Cornwall. It abandoned that seat and moved to Devon, where it spread out in various branches.

William Prideaux (died 1564) of Trevose, St Meryn, Cornwall
On 20 October 1537 he received a 99-year lease of the manor of Padstow from his uncle by marriage Thomas Munday, the last Prior of Bodmin. He was the second son of Humphrey Prideaux (1487–1550) of Theuborough in the parish of Sutcombe, by his first wife Joane Fowell, daughter of Richard Fowell of Fowell's Combe. His father had acquired for him the marriage of Johanna Munday (died 1561), daughter of John Munday of Rialton, the niece of the last Prior of Bodmin, Thomas Mundey, and he married Johanna Munday in 1537. The couple resided at Trevose for as yet no grand manor house existed at Padstow. His son John Prideaux (born 1547) received a lease in 1583 of premises in Padstow from Oliver Polwhele, and his own son John Prideaux (died 1633) was buried in Padstow. The paternal estate of Theuborough was inherited by William's eldest brother Richard Prideaux (1520–1603), of Theuborough.

Nicholas Prideaux (died 1560)
Uncle of William Prideaux (died 1564), obtained the freehold of the manor of Padstow, together with the remainder of the 99-year lease, which his nephew William had sold to a third party, perhaps as a related transaction. He also acquired the estate of Soldon near Holsworthy in Devon. He died childless and selected as his heir his nephew Roger Prideaux (died 1582) of Soldon, the younger brother of William Prideaux (died 1564), the former leaseholder of Padstow.

Roger Prideaux (c.1524–1582)
Third son of Humphrey Prideaux (1487–1550) of Theuborough. He was Member of Parliament for Totnes in Devon in 1545 and 1547. He served as Escheator of Devon and Cornwall in 1550 and as Sheriff of Devon in 1577. He purchased lands in Devon and Dorset, the manor of Launcells in Cornwall, and other properties in Essex, Devon and Somerset. He married Phillippa Yorke (died 1597), daughter of Richard (or Roger) Yorke, Serjeant-at-Law.

Sir Nicholas Prideaux (1550–1627)
Eldest son and heir, MP for Camelford 1571 and Sheriff of Cornwall in 1605. He inherited from his father the manors of Padstow, and the Devon manors of Holsworthy, Chesworthy, as well as his seat of Solden, in Holsworthy. He married twice, firstly to Thomasine Henscott and secondly in 1576 he married Cheston Viell (died 1610), 2nd daughter and co-heiress of William Viell of St Breock in Cornwall. He built the present mansion house at Prideaux Place in 1592, and moved his residence there after 1600 when he granted Solden to his eldest son Humphrey on the latter's marriage to Honor Fortescue. Prideaux Place was built just above the fishing-port village of Padstow and in about 1602 the historian of Cornwall Richard Carew wrote:

Mr. Nicholas Prideaux from his new and stately house thereby taketh a full and large prospect of the town, haven and country adjoining, to all which his wisdom is a stay, his authority a direction.

His younger brother was Sir Edmund Prideaux, 1st Baronet (died 1628), who also built a new mansion for himself, at Netherton, Farway in Devon, where his family was seated until 1875.

John Prideaux (1583–1649)
Second son, who inherited Prideaux Place, whilst Soldon was inherited by his elder half-brother Humphrey Prideaux. John married Anne Moyle, but died childless, when Prideaux Place was inherited by his half-nephew Edmund Prideaux (died 1683), Sheriff of Cornwall in 1664, third son of his elder half-brother Humphrey Prideaux by his wife Honor Fortescue.

Edmund Prideaux (1606–1683)
MP for Saltash in the Third Protectorate Parliament of January 1659 and Sheriff of Cornwall in 1664. He was the third son of Humphrey Prideaux of Soldon by his wife Honor Fortescue. He inherited Prideaux place from his childless half-uncle John Prideaux (1583–1649). During the English Civil War he supported the Parliamentarians, and after the Restoration of the Monarchy in 1660 his return to royal favour may have been due to the fact that his sister Elizabeth Prideaux was the wife of Sir William Morice (1602–1676) of Werrington, Devon, Secretary of State to King Charles II. 43 letters between Edmund Prideaux and Morrice survive in the library at Prideaux Place. His mother Honor Fortescue is said by tradition to have jumped to her death from the staircase at Prideaux Place, and her ghost, known as "The Green Lady" is said to remain at the house. He married Bridget Moyle. His third son was Very Rev. Humphrey Prideaux (1648–1724), Dean of Norwich, whose son Edmund Prideaux (1693–1745) eventually inherited Prideaux Place.

John Prideaux
Eldest son, who married Anne Mallock.

Edmund Prideaux (died 1728)
Eldest son, who died childless. His heir was his first cousin Edmund Prideaux (1693–1745).

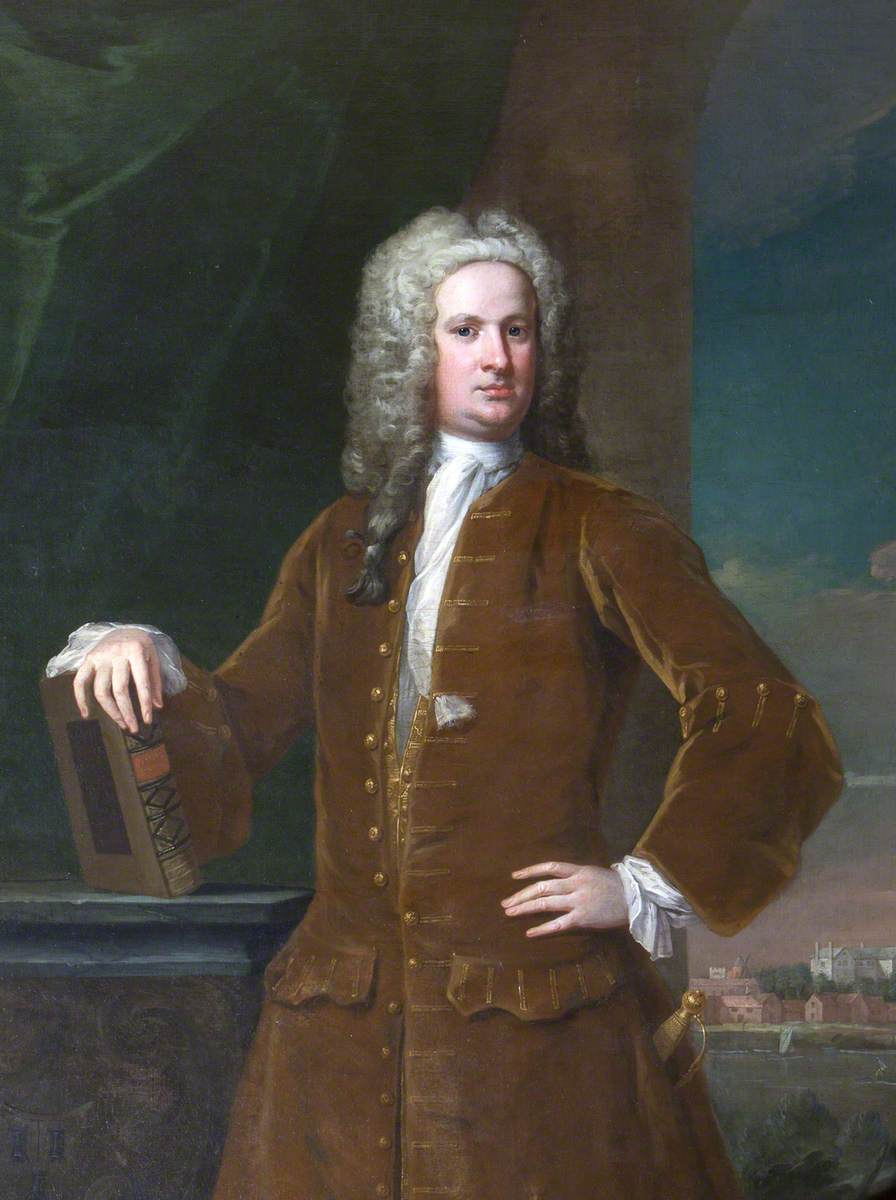
Edmund Prideaux, 1730 portrait by William Aikman. Prideaux Place is shown in the background

Edmund Prideaux (1693–1745)
Son of Very Rev. Humphrey Prideaux (1648–1724), Dean of Norwich, by his wife Bridget Bokenham (died 1700). He was brought up in Norfolk, and in 1728, inherited Prideaux Place from his childless first cousin Edmund Prideaux. He was a connoiseur of art and architecture and went on a grand tour of Italy late in life. He visited many of the great country houses of Devon, Cornwall, Norfolk and elsewhere and made architectural drawings of them, which today are preserved at Prideaux Place. Amongst his drawings are several of Prideaux Place, of Netherton, the seat of his cousins, and of Stowe House, Kilkhampton, in Cornwall, seat of the Grenville Earls of Bath. When Stowe was demolished in the 1720s, it was probably Edmund Prideaux who purchased many of the fittings and installed them at Prideaux Place, where he carried out substantial re-modelling. The present cantilevered staircase in the hall and the wood-panelled "Grenville Room" (or Reading Room) both came from Stowe House at that time. In 1717 he married Hannah Wrench (1697–1726), daughter of Sir Benjamin Wrench of the City of Norwich. She died 2 February 1726, aged 29 years, two years before her husband inherited Prideaux Place.

Humphrey Prideaux (born 1719)
Sheriff of Cornwall in 1750. His second wife was Jenny Pleydell, daughter of Neville Morton Pleydell of Shitterton by his wife Betty Brune, only daughter and sole heiress of Charles Brune of Plumber in the parish of Sturminster Newton, Dorset. His son from his first marriage died before him and by his second wife Jenny Pleydell he had six sons and one daughter.

=== Prideaux-Brune ===
Arms of Brune of Plumber adopted in 1799 by Rev. Charles Prideaux-Brune

Rev. Charles Prideaux-Brune (1760–1833), of Prideaux Place
Eldest son by his father's second marriage. In 1788 he married Frances Patten (died 1831) and in 1799, on succeeding to the Brune family estates and in accordance with the terms of the bequest, assumed by royal licence the surname Brune as a suffix to that of Prideaux. Between about 1810 and 1833 he substantially re-modelled the house in the Gothic Revival style of Strawberry Hill House in Twickenham, Middlesex, built by Horace Walpole in 1749

Charles Prideaux-Brune (1821–1907)
Eldest son and heir, Sheriff of Cornwall in 1880 and a Deputy Lieutenant. In 1846 he married Hon. Helen Carew (died 1902), daughter of Robert Shapland Carew, 1st Baron Carew (1787–1856).

Col. Charles Robert Prideaux-Brune (1848–1936)
Eldest son and heir, Sheriff of Cornwall in 1916/17, Colonel of the Rifle Brigade. In 1883 he married Hon. Katharine Hugessen (died 1926), eldest daughter of Edward Hugessen Knatchbull-Hugessen, 1st Baron Brabourne (1829–1893). He extended the service rooms in 1907.

Fulke Knatchbull Prideaux-Brune (1887–1939)
Eldest son and heir, formerly of Highfield Dallington, Sussex. he was badly injured in World War I, in which he served with the 6th Inniskillen Dragoons. He was taken prisoner of war in 1918. He married Mary Kathleen Garvan of New South Wales, Australia.

John Charles Prideaux-Brune (1916–1988),
Eldest son and heir, and a musician. In 1944 Prideaux Place served as a base of the 121st Engineer Combat Battalion of the US Army, which marched from Prideaux to embark for the D-Day Normandy landings.

Peter Prideaux Brune (1944–2025)
Eldest son and heir, living in 2015 at Prideaux Place with his wife Elisabeth.

Prideaux Place announced that Peter died peacefully in his sleep on the 10th July 2025.

== As film and television location ==
In 1975 the house was used for the episode The Ash Tree of the series A Ghost Story for Christmas. In 2006 the BBC filmed the Antiques Roadshow at Prideaux Place, hosted by Michael Aspel, which was broadcast as episodes seven and eight of Series 29. Prideaux Place has been used in numerous German-language television films based on novels by Rosamunde Pilcher and was featured in an episode of Quest TV's 'Salvage Hunters'.

== See also ==
- Padstow Coastal Gun Battery
