= Edmund Prideaux (artist) =

English painter

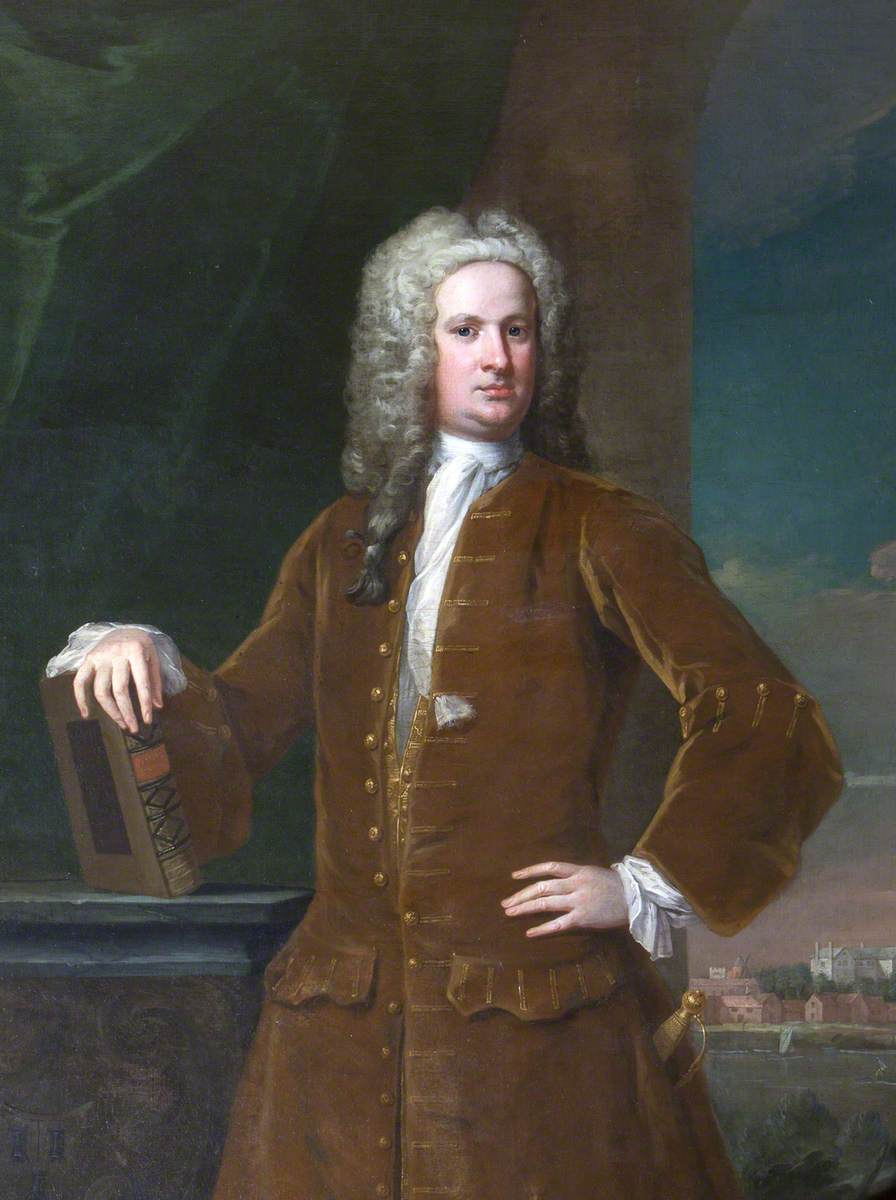
Edmund Prideaux (1693–1745) of Prideaux Place, 1730 portrait by William Aikman, collection of National Trust, Blickling Hall, Norfolk. Prideaux Place is shown in the background

Edmund Prideaux (1693–1745) was an English painter and architect in Cornwall best known for his involvement in the architectural remodelling of Prideaux Place, an English country house located in Padstow.

== Origins ==
He was christened on 22 February 1693 at Soham Tony, Norfolk and was the only surviving son of Very Rev. Humphrey Prideaux (1648–1724), Dean of Norwich from 1702, (3rd son of Edmund Prideaux (d.1683) of Prideaux Place, Sheriff of Cornwall in 1664, by his wife Bridget Moyle) by his wife Bridget Bokenham (d.1700), daughter of Anthony Bokenham of Helmingham, Suffolk.

== Youth ==
His mother died when he was aged 7 after which he developed a strong bond with his father, as is apparent from Edmund's writings.

== Career ==
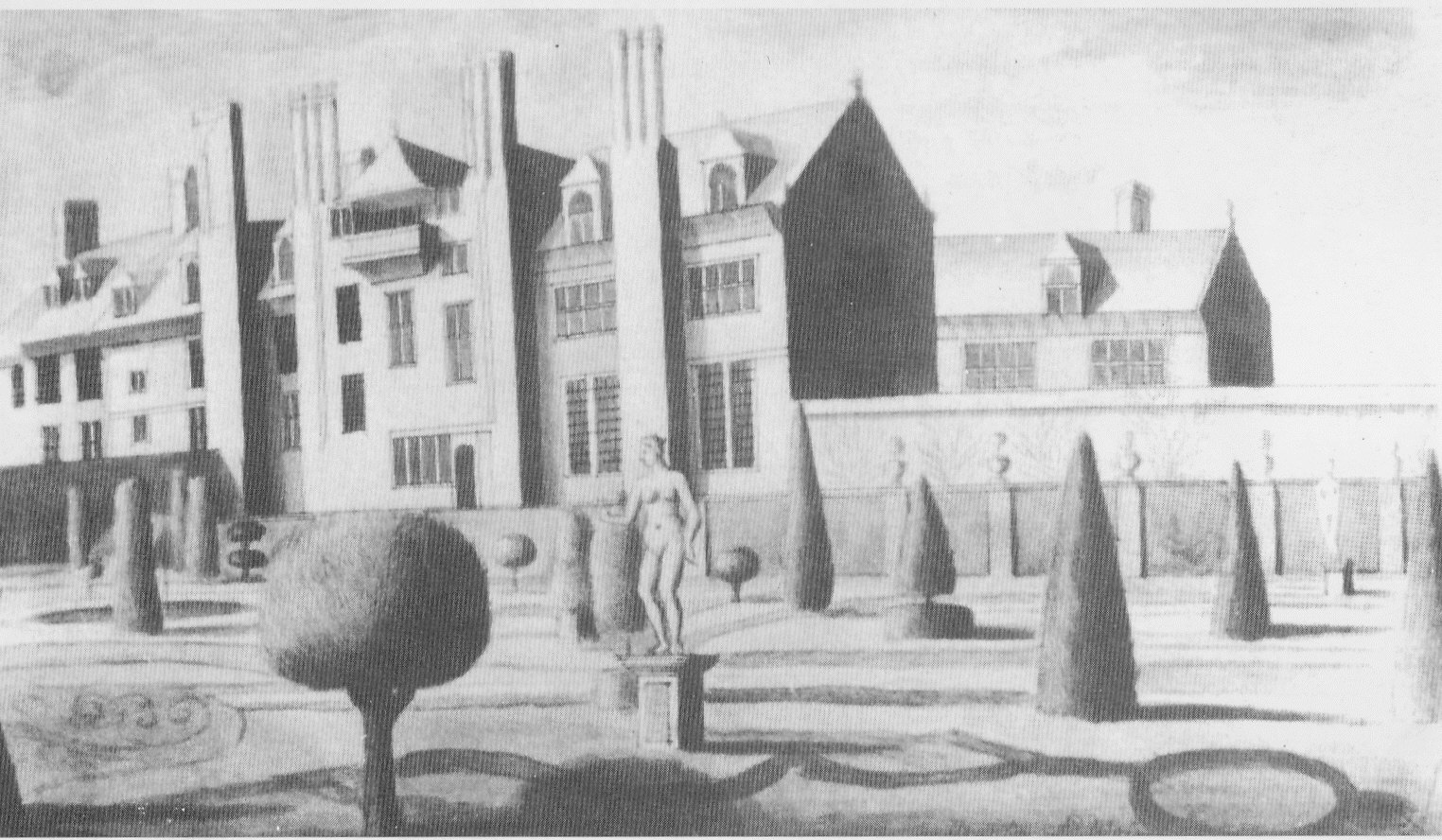
1716 drawing by Edmund Prideaux of Heanton Satchville, Petrockstowe, Devon, demolished

He was admitted a fellow commoner at Clare Hall, Cambridge on 22 May 1711 and became a lawyer, having entered the Middle Temple on 10 February 1711/2 and having been called to the bar in 1718. From about the age of 21 he visited several country houses belonging to the Prideaux family and friends, and made many "topographical drawings", many of which survive as valuable records of houses since demolished or altered, for example Stowe, Kilkhampton in Cornwall and Heanton Satchville, Petrockstowe in Devon. Following the death of his wife at a young age, he "immersed himself in the study of all scholarly matters, particularly architecture and garden design". Unusually late in life, in about 1739 at the age of 46, he made a Grand Tour of Italy and brought back to England a collection of pictures and Roman antiquities. He was well-travelled, as is apparent from the contents of his surviving cash-book.

== Inheritance ==
In 1728, at the age of 35 and 2 years after his wife's death, he inherited Prideaux Place from his first cousin Edmund Prideaux (d.1728), who died without progeny, the eldest son of John Prideaux by his wife Anne Mallock. He remodelled both the interior and exterior of the house and landscaped the grounds, adding garden buildings and a wilderness with serpentine paths.

== Marriage and progeny ==
On 17 April 1717 he married Hannah Wrench (1697–1726), daughter of Sir Benjamin Wrench of the City of Norwich. She died 2 February 1726, aged 29 years. He had the following progeny:

- Humphrey Prideaux (born 1719), of Prideaux Place, Sheriff of Cornwall in 1750.

== Death and burial ==
He died and was buried on 23 June 1745 at Padstow. His will was dated January 1743, with a codicil dated 12 June 1745.
