= Padstow =

Town in Cornwall, England

Coordinates: 50.538°N 4.938°W

Padstow: Cornish: Lannwedhenek
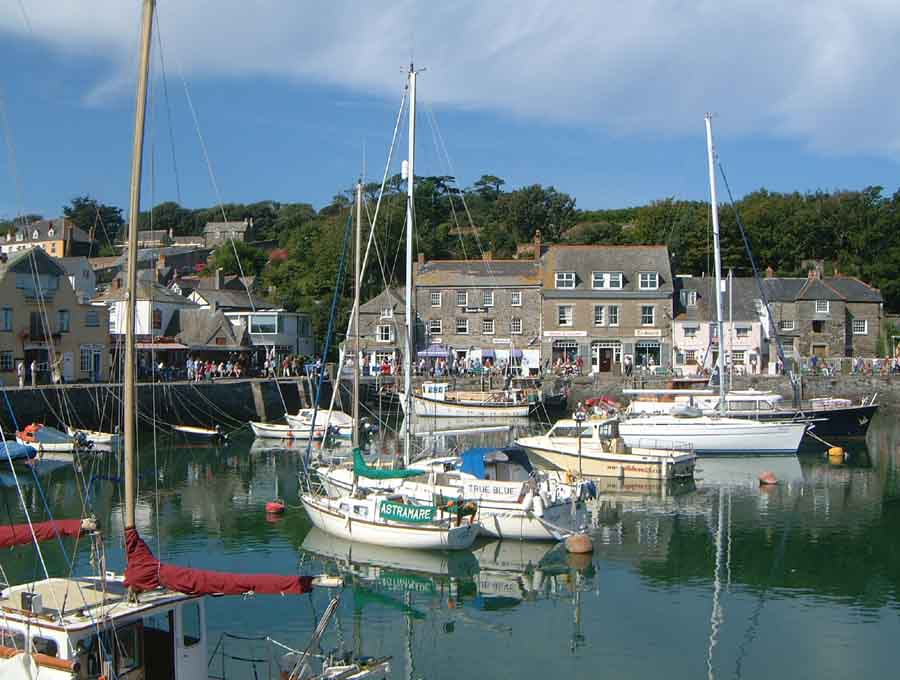
- Padstow Inner Harbour & quayside

- Location within Cornwall
- Population: 2,669 (Parish, 2021); 2,298 (Built up area, 2021)
- OS grid reference: SW918751
- Civil parish: Padstow
- Unitary authority: Cornwall Council
- Ceremonial county: Cornwall
- Region: South West
- Country: England
- Sovereign state: United Kingdom
- Post town: PADSTOW
- Postcode district: PL28
- Dialling code: 01841
- Police: Devon and Cornwall
- Fire: Cornwall
- Ambulance: South Western
- UK Parliament: North Cornwall

Padstow (/ˈpædstoʊ/; Cornish: Lannwedhenek [lanːwɛˈðɛnɛk]) is a town, civil parish and fishing port on the north coast of Cornwall, England, United Kingdom. The town is situated on the west bank of the River Camel estuary, approximately 5 miles (8.0 km) northwest of Wadebridge, 10 miles (16 km) northwest of Bodmin and 10 miles (16 km) northeast of Newquay. As well as Padstow itself, the parish also includes the village of Trevone and surrounding rural areas. At the 2021 census the population of the parish was 2,669 and the population of the built up area was 2,298.

The geology of the low plateau west of Padstow has resulted in such features as Tregudda Gorge where erosion along the faultline has caused sheer cliffs to form; and Marble Cliffs which has alternating dark grey and light grey strata. The Round Hole is a collapsed sea cave.

== History ==
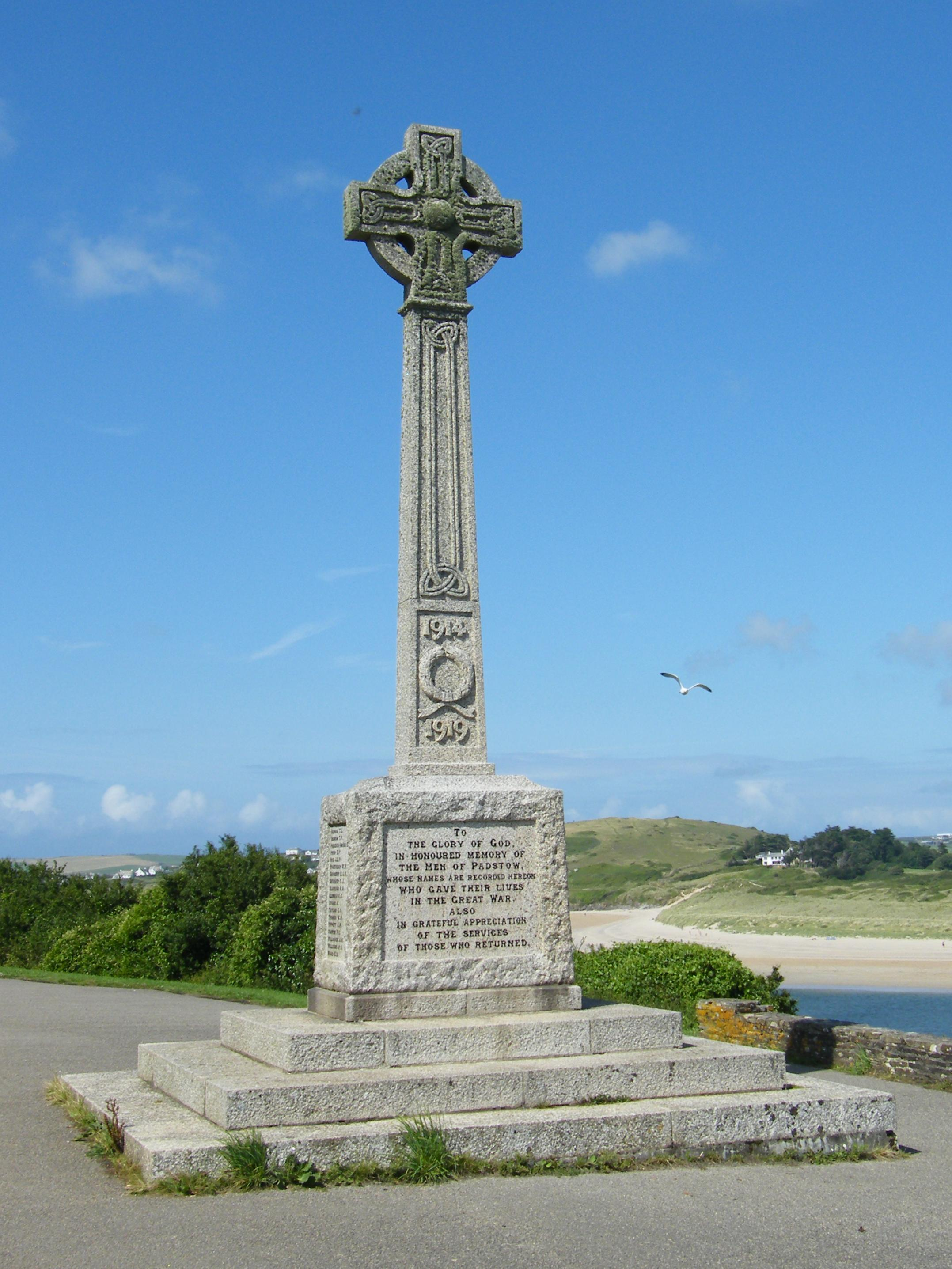
Padstow war memorial

In English, Padstow was originally named Adelstow after Æthelstan who was reported by John Leland to be 'chief governor of privileges onto it'. Adelstow was commuted into Petroc-stow, Petroc-stowe, or 'Petrock's Place', after the Welsh missionary Saint Petroc, who landed at Trebetherick around AD 500. After his death a monastery (Lanwethinoc, the church of Wethinoc, an earlier holy man) was established here which was of great importance until Petroces stow (probably Padstow) was raided by the Vikings in 981, according to the Anglo-Saxon Chronicle. Whether as a result of this attack or later, the monks moved inland to Bodmin, taking with them the relics of St Petroc. The cult of St Petroc was important both in Padstow and Bodmin.

Padstow is recorded in the Domesday Book (1086) when it was held by Bodmin Monastery. There was land for 4 ploughs, 5 villeins who had 2 ploughs, 6 smallholders and 24 acres of pasture. It was valued at 10 shillings (half of a pound sterling).

In the medieval period, Padstow was commonly called Aldestowe ('old place' in contrast to Bodmin, the 'new place'). or Hailemouth (heyl being Cornish for 'estuary'). The modern Cornish form Lannwedhenek derives from Lanwethinoc and in a simpler form appears in the name of the Lodenek Press, a publisher based in Padstow.

Padstow had considerable importance in the middle ages as a manor belonging to Bodmin monastery and as the site of a safe haven (one of the few on the north coast). So it became a busy fishing port and the site of nine chapels in addition to the parish church. The manor was leased to the family of Prideaux by the last prior before the dissolution in Henry VIII's reign. The town prospered through trade with Ireland and the English and Welsh ports on the Bristol Channel. Later trade was the export of tin, copper, lead, slate, cured fish and dairy produce, as well as the importing of timber from Norway and Sweden, salt and wine from France, and hemp, iron and jute from Russia. The population in 1841 was 1,791.

In the first half of the 19th century it was a significant port of embarcation for emigrants, in particular those bound for Canada. Later on a shipbuilding industry developed with five shipyards though by 1900 this had declined. The North Cornwall Railway reached Padstow in 1899, a large hotel was built and there was a revival of the fishing industry.

The seal of the borough of Padstow was a ship with three masts, the sails furled and an anchor hanging from the bow, with the legend "Padstow".

The TV archaeology programme Time Team filmed in Padstow for the episode "From Constantinople to Cornwall," broadcast on 9 March 2008.

There are two Cornish crosses in the parish: one is built into a wall in the old vicarage garden and another is at Prideaux Place (consisting of a four-holed head and part of an ornamented cross shaft). There is also part of a decorated cross shaft in the churchyard.

During World War II, in 1940, a single aircraft dropped some bombs on the town, one of which hit and demolished a terrace of houses in New Street, killing three.

== Churches ==
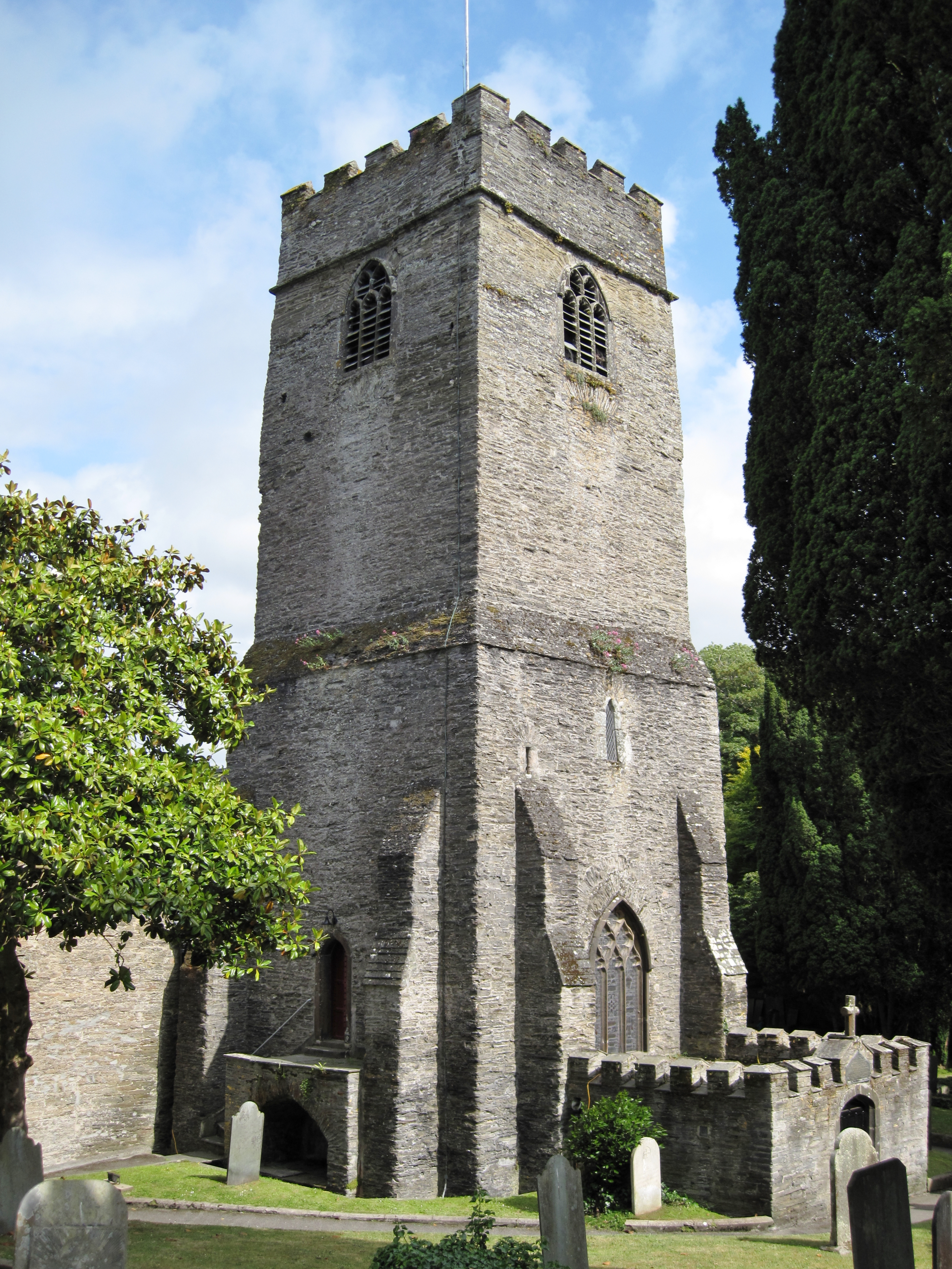
St Petroc's church

The church of St Petroc is one of four said to have been founded by the saint, the others being Little Petherick (or St Petroc Minor), Parracombe and Bodmin. It is quite large and mostly of 13th- and 14th-century date. There is a fine 15th-century font of Catacleuse stone; the pulpit of c. 1530 is also of interest. There are two fine monuments to members of the Prideaux family (Sir Nicholas, 1627. and Edmund, 1693): there is also a monumental brass of 1421. The benefice is a rectory: Padstow (St Petroc), St Merryn and St Issey with St Petroc Minor (Little Petherick) now form a group within the deanery of Pydar.

== Governance ==
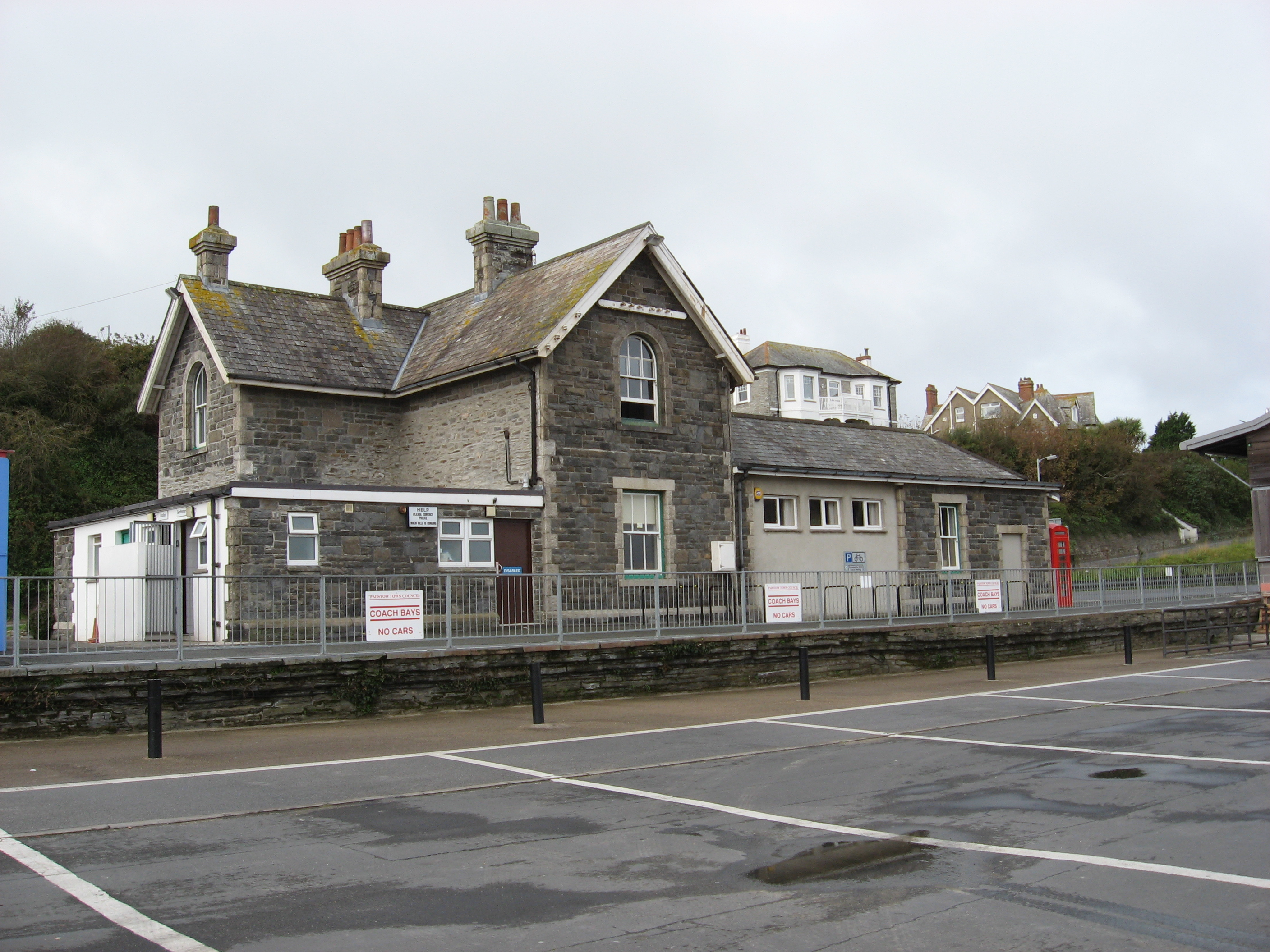
Former Padstow railway station; Building now serves as offices of Padstow Town Council

There are two tiers of local government covering Padstow, and parish (town) and unitary authority level: Padstow Town Council and Cornwall Council. The town council is based at Station House, part of the former Padstow railway station.

=== Administrative history ===
Padstow was an ancient parish in the Pydarshire Hundred of Cornwall. In 1583 the town was incorporated as a borough, but its borough status later lapsed.

In 1866 a Padstow local government district was established which just covered the town itself. It was administered by an elected local board. Such districts were reconstituted as urban districts under the Local Government Act 1894. The 1894 Act also directed that civil parishes could no longer straddle district boundaries, and so the part of Padstow parish outside the urban district became a separate parish called Padstow Rural. Padstow Urban District was enlarged in 1934 to take in the area of the Padstow Rural parish, which was abolished.

Padstow Urban District was abolished in 1968. The former urban district then made a rural parish within the Wadebridge and Padstow Rural District and given a parish council. Wadebridge and Padstow Rural District was abolished six years later in 1974 under the Local Government Act 1972, becoming part of the new North Cornwall district. As part of the 1974 reforms, parish councils were given the right to declare their parishes to be a town and take the title of town council, which Padstow Parish Council took, becoming Padstow Town Council.

North Cornwall was in turn abolished in 2009. Cornwall County Council then took on district-level functions, making it a unitary authority, and was renamed Cornwall Council.

== Economy ==
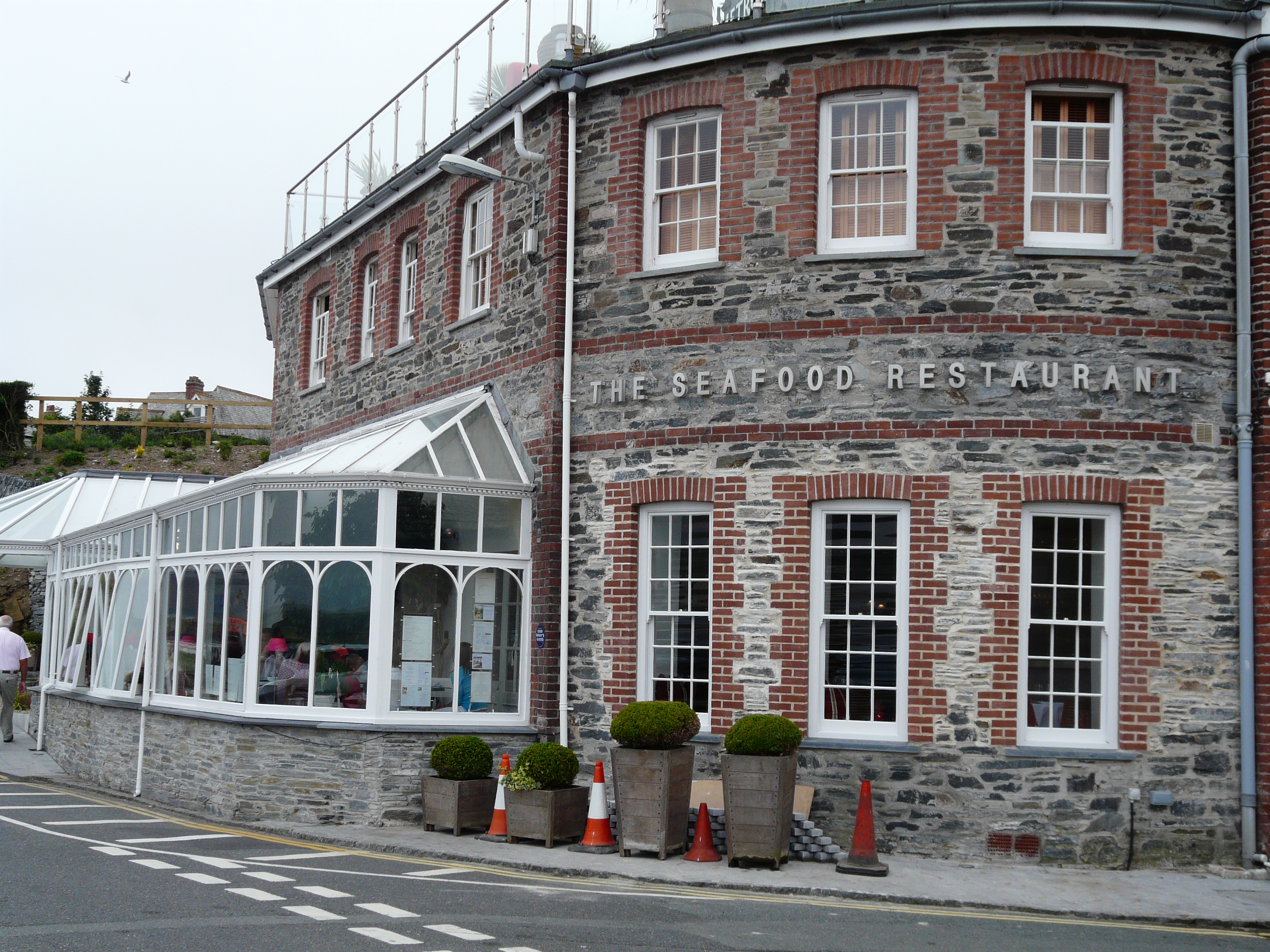
Rick Stein's Seafood Restaurant, Padstow

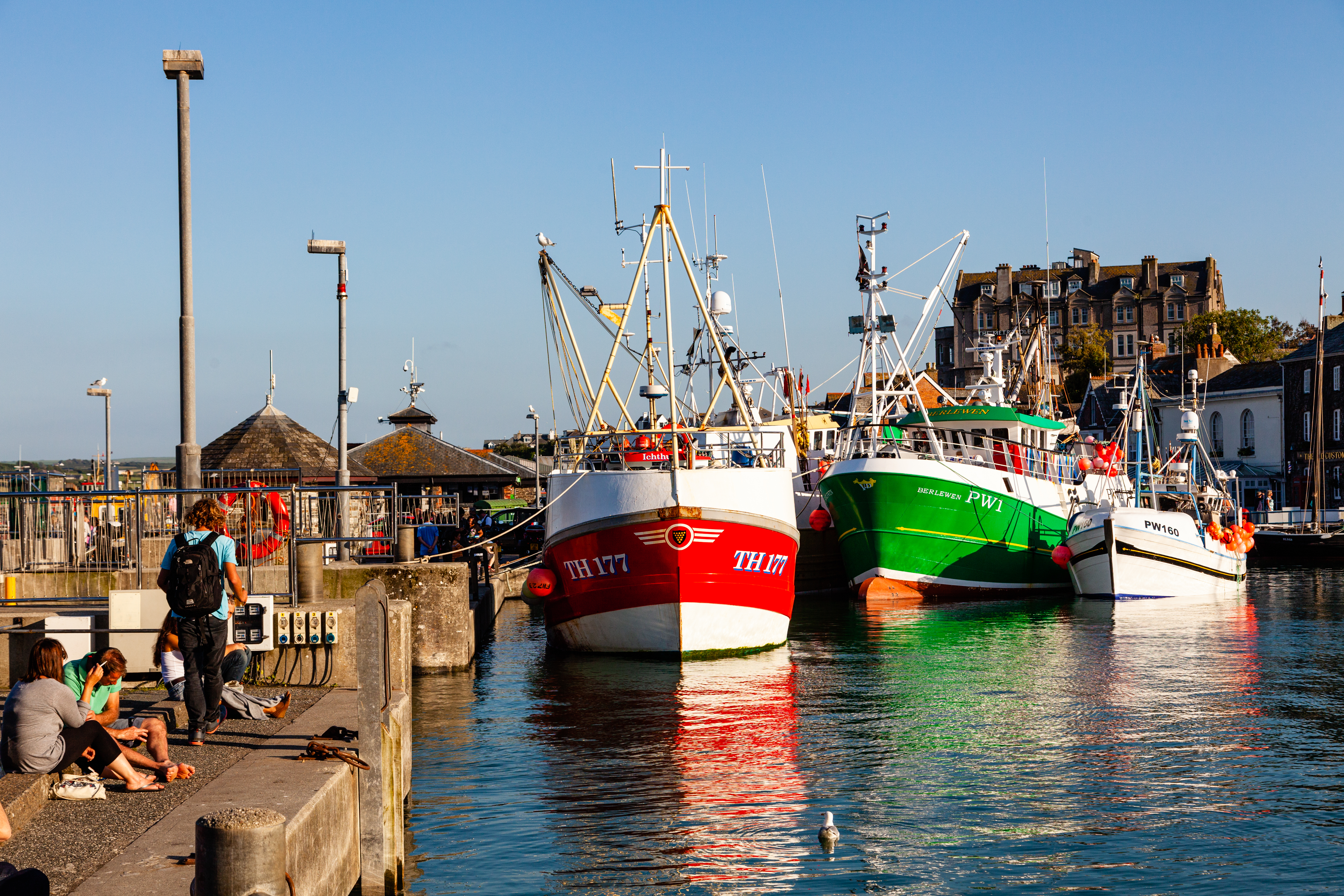
Fishing trawler in Padstow harbour

Traditionally a fishing port, Padstow is now a popular tourist destination. Although some of its former fishing fleet remains, it is mainly a yachting haven on a dramatic coastline with few easily navigable harbours. The influence of restaurateur Rick Stein can be seen in the port, and tourists travel from long distances to eat at his restaurant and cafés. This has led to the town being dubbed "Padstein", by food writers in the British media.

Plans to build a skatepark in Padstow were proposed and funds were raised to create this at the Recreation Ground (Wheal Jubilee Parc). Construction was completed in 2019.

== Transport ==
=== Maritime traffic ===
Padstow had considerable importance in the Middle Ages as a manor belonging to Bodmin monastery and as the site of a safe haven (one of the few on the north coast). So it became a busy fishing port. Padstow prospered through trade with Ireland and the English and Welsh ports on the Bristol Channel, and during the early 18th Century returned over £100 in duties related to coal imports for both the periods 1708-1710 and 1710-1713, more than any other cornish port except Falmouth. Later trade was the export of tin, copper, lead, slate, cured fish and dairy produce, as well as the importing of timber from Norway and Sweden, salt and wine from France, and hemp, iron and jute from Russia.

In the first half of the 19th century Padstow was a significant port of embarcation for emigrants, particularly those bound for Canada, and during the mid-19th century ships carrying timber from Canada such as the barques Clio, Belle and Voluna; and the brig Dalusia were making the journey across the Atlantic. Quebec City was a specific destination recorded and while such vessels brought timber, the offer of cheap travel to passengers wishing to emigrate enticed some to make the journey to Canada. Local shipbuilders also benefited from the quality of incoming cargoes, although shipbuilding had been practiced in Padstow for centuries and the town provided ships for the siege of Calais in 1346. The practice continued, aided by the imported materials, and there five shipyards recorded in the late 19th century though by 1900 this had declined.

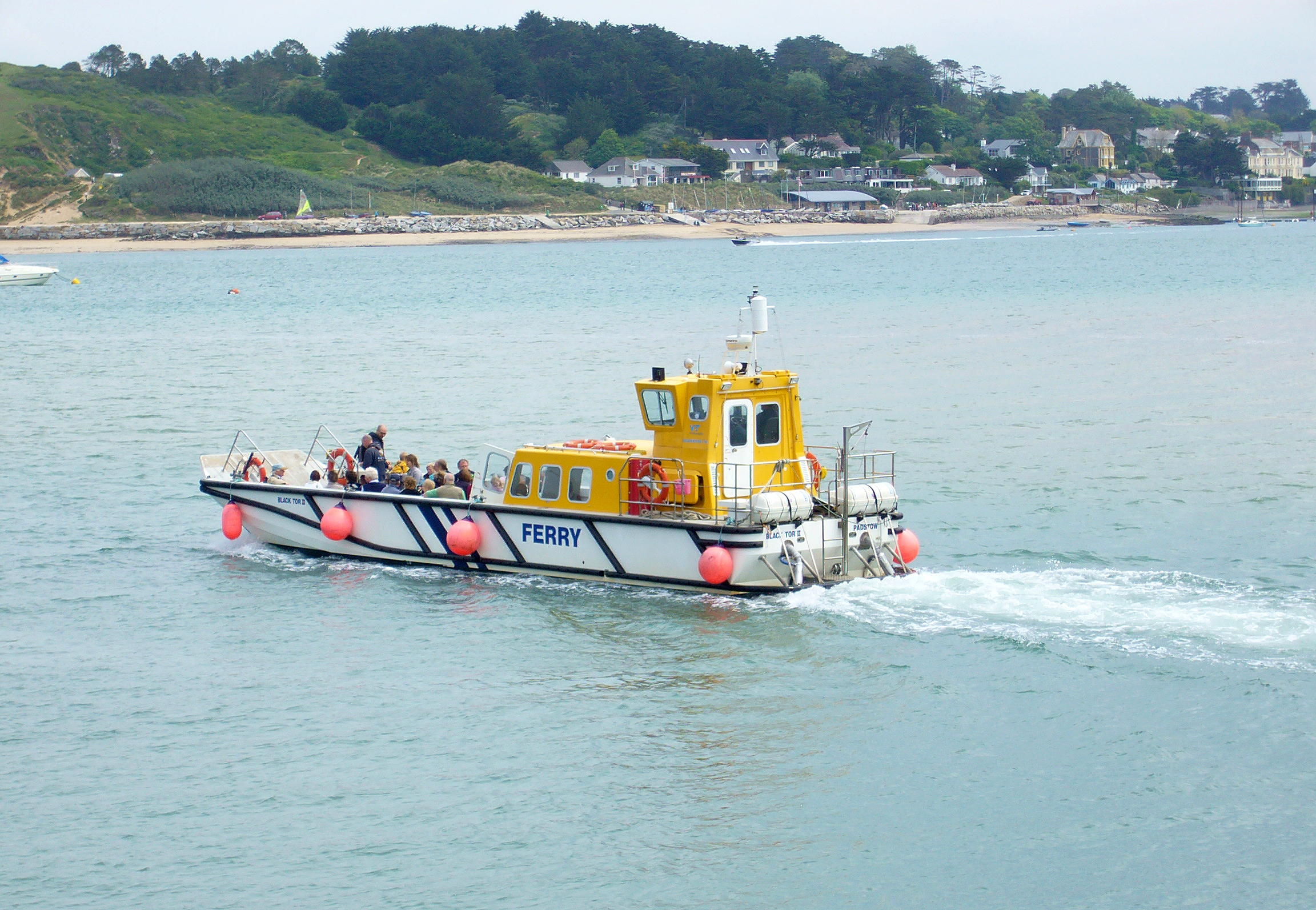
Padstow-Rock ferry

The approach from the sea into the River Camel is partially blocked by the Doom Bar, a bank of sand extending across the estuary which is a significant hazard to shipping and the cause of many shipwrecks. A lifeboat station was established in 1827.

For ships entering the estuary, the immediate loss of wind due to the cliffs was a particular hazard, often resulting in ships being swept onto the Doom Bar. A manual capstan was installed on the west bank of the river (its remains can still be seen) and rockets were fired to carry a line to ships so that they could be winched to safety.

There have been ferries across the Camel estuary for centuries and the current service, the Black Tor Ferry, carries pedestrians between Padstow and Rock daily throughout the year.

Burgee of Padstow Sailing Club, established in 1965

In 1964, the harbour commissioners regained control of the harbour from the British Transport Commission and then made some improvements to it. The harbour comprises a tidal outer harbour that is used by ships and commercial vessels, and a smaller inner harbour that is popular with yachtsmen. This inner harbour is a half tide dock that uses a "gate-flap" to maintain water levels on an ebbing tide, so that the yachts within stay afloat at all stages of the tide.

=== Railway ===
From 1899 until 1967, Padstow railway station was the westernmost point of the former Southern Railway. The railway station was the terminus of an extension from Wadebridge of the former Bodmin and Wadebridge Railway and North Cornwall Railway. These lines were part of the London & South Western Railway (LSWR), then incorporated into the Southern Railway in 1923 and British Railways in 1948, but were proposed for closure as part of the Beeching cuts of the 1960s.

The LSWR (and Southern Railway) promoted Padstow as a holiday resort; these companies were rivals to the Great Western Railway (which was the larger railway in the West of England). Until 1964, Padstow was served by the Atlantic Coast Express, a direct train service to/from London Waterloo, but the station was closed in 1967. The old railway line is now the Camel Trail, a footpath and cycle path which is popular owing to its picturesque route beside the River Camel. One of the railway mileposts is now embedded outside the Shipwright's Arms public house on the Harbour Front.

Today, the nearest railway station is at Bodmin Parkway, three miles southeast of Bodmin. Go Cornwall Bus operates buses to the station.

=== Buses ===
Padstow is served by bus services 56 from Newquay and 57 from Liskeard which also serves Bodmin Parkway as noted above. Both are operated by Go Cornwall Bus and run mostly hourly Monday to Saturday, less frequently on Sundays and Bank Holidays.

=== Footpaths ===
The South West Coast Path runs on both sides of the River Camel estuary and crosses from Padstow to Rock via the Black Tor ferry. The path gives walking access to the coast with Stepper Point and Trevose Head within an easy day's walk of Padstow.

The Saints' Way long-distance footpath runs from Padstow to Fowey on the south coast of Cornwall.

The Camel Trail follows the course of the former railway (see above) from Padstow. It is open to walkers, cyclists and horse riders and suitable for disabled access. The 17.3-mile (27.8 km) long route leads to Wadebridge and on to Wenford Bridge and Bodmin, and is used by an estimated 400,000 users each year, generating an income of approximately £3 million a year.

== Culture ==
=== 'Obby 'Oss festival ===
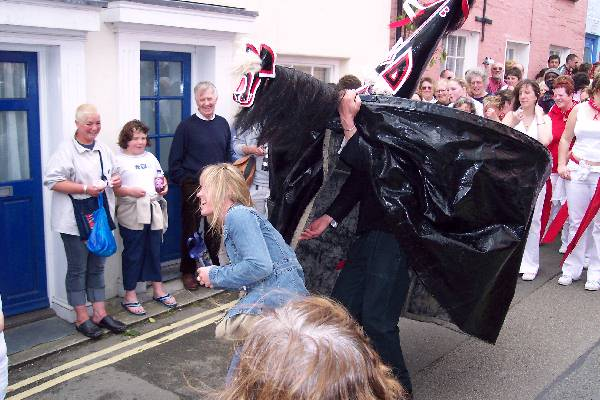
The 'Old Oss' capturing a passing maiden during the Mayday festival

The "'Obby 'Oss" festival is a major tourist attraction. The festival starts at midnight on May Eve when townspeople gather outside the Golden Lion Inn to sing the "Night Song." By morning, the town has been dressed with greenery and flowers placed around the maypole. The excitement begins with the appearance of one of the 'Obby 'Osses. Male dancers cavort through the town dressed as one of two 'Obby 'Osses, the "Old" and the "Blue Ribbon" 'Obby 'Osses; as the name suggests, they are stylised kinds of horses. Prodded on by acolytes known as "Teasers," each wears a mask and black frame-hung cape under which they try to catch young maidens as they pass through the town. Throughout the day, the two parades, led by the "Mayer" in his top hat and decorated stick, followed by a band of accordions and drums, then the 'Oss and the Teaser, with a host of people – all singing the "Morning Song" – passing along the streets of the town. Finally, late in the evening, the two 'osses meet, at the maypole, before returning to their respective stables where the crowd sings of the 'Obby 'Oss death, until its resurrection the following May Eve.

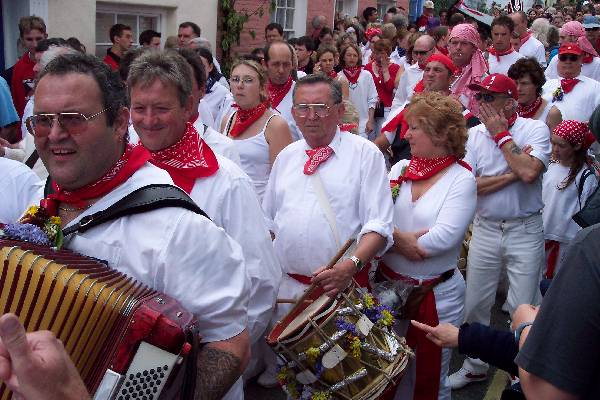
The 'Old Oss' party attending the Oss with dozens of accordions and drums

=== Mummers' or Darkie Day ===
On Boxing Day and New Year's Day, it is a tradition for some residents to don blackface and parade through the town singing 'minstrel' songs. This is an ancient midwinter celebration that occurs every year in Padstow and was originally part of the pagan heritage of midwinter celebrations that were regularly celebrated all over Cornwall where people would guise dance and disguise themselves by blackening up their faces or wearing masks. Recently (since 2007), the people of Penzance have revived its midwinter celebration with the Montol Festival which like Padstow at times would have had people darkening or painting their skin to disguise themselves as well as masking.)

Folklorists associate the practice with the widespread British custom of blacking up for mumming and morris dancing, and suggest there is no record of slave ships coming to Padstow. Once an unknown local charity event, the day has recently become controversial, perhaps since a description was published. Also some now suggest it is racist for white people to "black up" for any reason. Although "outsiders" have linked the day with racism, Padstonians insist that this is not the case and are incredulous at both description and allegations. Long before the controversy Charlie Bate, noted Padstow folk advocate, recounted that in the 1970s the content and conduct of the day were carefully reviewed to avoid potential offence. The Devon and Cornwall Constabulary have taken video evidence twice and concluded there were no grounds for prosecution. Nonetheless protests resurface annually. The day has now been renamed Mummers' Day in an attempt to avoid offence and identify it more clearly with established Cornish tradition. The debate has now been subject to academic scrutiny.

Other similar traditions that use the black-face disguise and are still celebrated within the United Kingdom are the Border Morris dancers, and Molly dancers of the East Midlands and East Anglia.

== Cornish wrestling ==
There have been Cornish wrestling tournaments held in Padstow for at least the last 200 years. Tournaments have been held at the Drill Hall, the "Lawn" overlooking the harbour and at the Commercial Hotel.

== Notable people ==
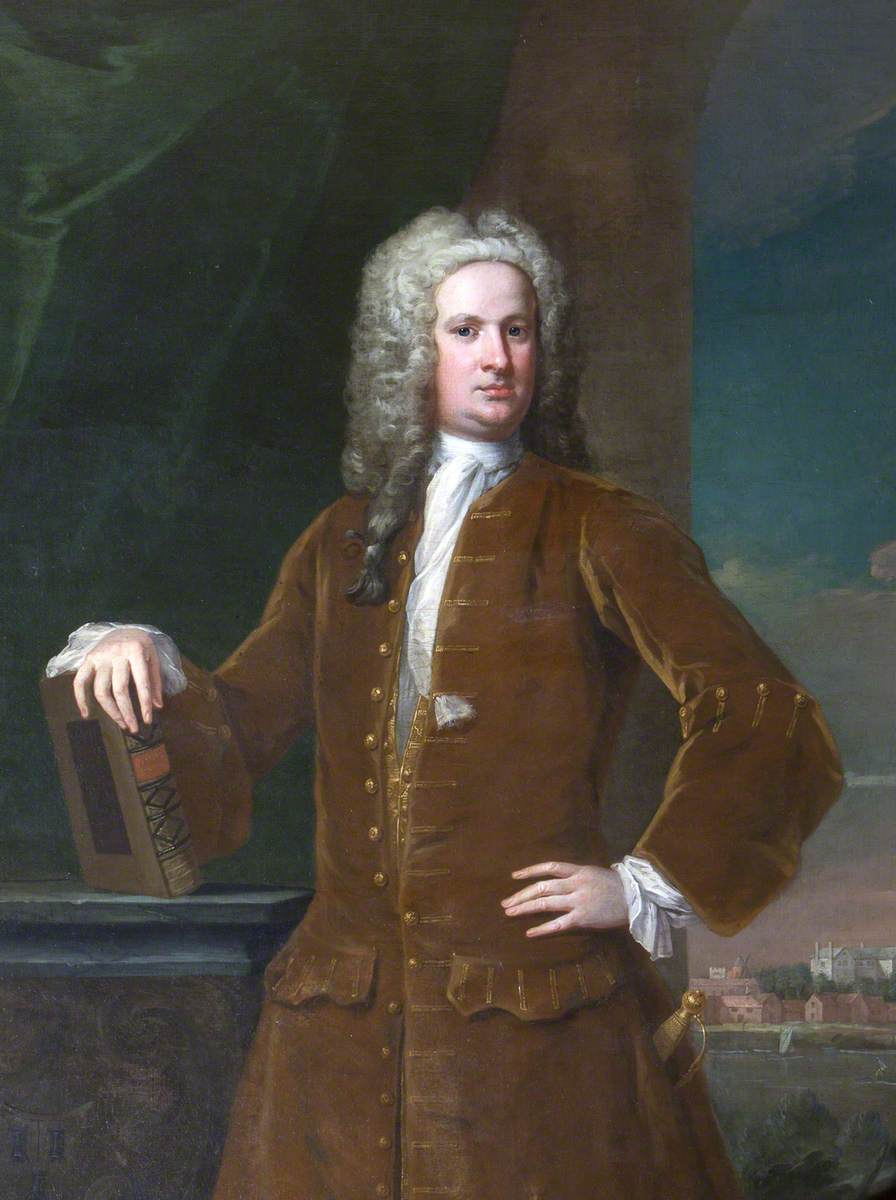
Edmund Prideaux, 1730

- Dr. Humphrey Prideaux (1648–1724), Dean of Norwich
- Edmund Prideaux (1693–1745), painter and architect, he remodelled Prideaux Place.
- Matthew Quintal, (1766–1799 on Pitcairn Island), an able seaman. The last of the mutineers from HMS Bounty to be murdered on Pitcairn Island
- Sir Goldsworthy Gurney (1793–1875), surgeon, chemist, architect, builder, lecturer and consultant
- Edward Dayman (1807–1890), an English clergyman and hymn writer
- Enys Tregarthen (1850–1923), author and folklorist
- Sir James Herbert Cory, 1st Baronet (1857–1933), a Welsh politician and ship-owner
- Brian Edrich (1922–2009), an English cricketer who played 181 first-class cricket games for Kent and Glamorgan
- Donald Rawe (1930–2018), Cornish publisher, dramatist, novelist and poet, he became a member of Gorseth Kernow in 1970, under the Bardic name of Scryfer Lanwednoc ('Writer of Padstow').
- Rick Stein (born 1947), restaurateur and celebrity chef, owns several restaurants and businesses in the town.
- Paul Ainsworth (born 1979), Michelin starred chef, runs four businesses in Padstow.

== See also ==
- Padstow Coastal Gun Battery
- Padstow Lifeboat Station
