= Padstow Coastal Gun Battery =

British WW2 coastal defence

- Padstow, Cornwall in United Kingdom
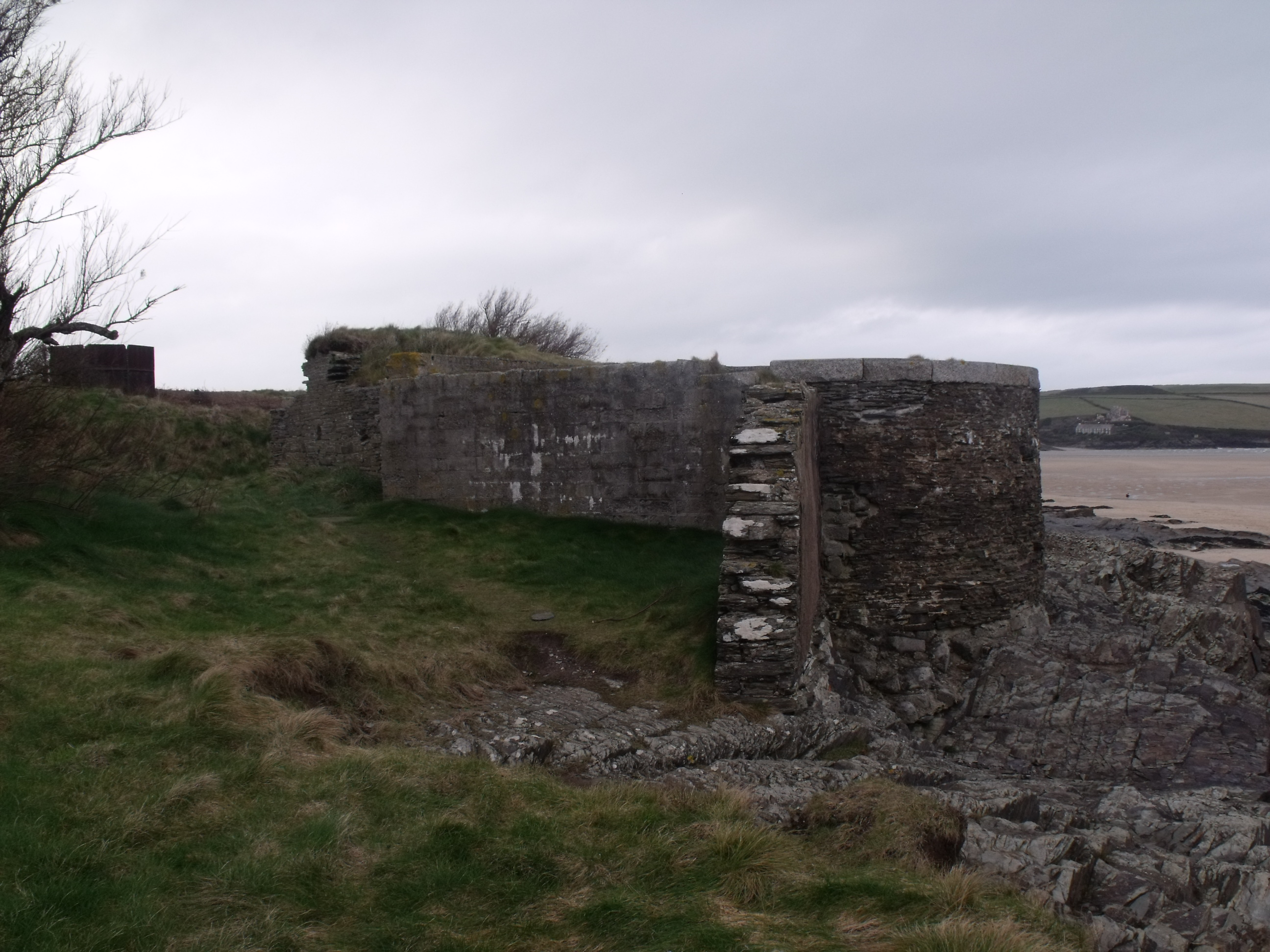
- The old barbette

Site information
- Condition: Ruined

Location
- Coordinates: 50°32′47.73″N 4°56′4.71″W

Padstow Coastal Gun Battery was built in the summer of 1940 at the northern end of the Bodmin Stop Line to defend against a German invasion of Britain. It utilised an old military site first established during the War of American Independence north of Padstow overlooking the Camel Estuary and known as Gun Point. Padstow is a port on the north Cornish coast.

== Establishment of the battery ==
Date	State of the Battery
July 1940	The layout of the battery was detailed by Col Oliver C.F.D, Plymouth, and was constructed under the supervision of Captain Pockles, Royal Engineers, Bodmin, for two 4 inches naval guns. The old magazine from 1870 which was built of a well-built brick arch was uncovered and tested. It was recovered and put to use as Magazine No 1. Magazine No 2 was built from scratch with reinforced concrete roof and sides and an inner brick wall with a cavity and a raised floor. One gun platform was built on top of the old circular barbette and the other on a new platform built towards the northern hedge.
14 August 1940	Both guns were ready for action. They were 4 inch Breech Loading Mk VII naval guns.
23 August 1940	Major Kirby, I.G., Plymouth, arrived with a party. All sights were tested, buffer system checked and each gun fired three shells seaward, with a range of 4500 yards. The fall of the shot was observed to be consistent.

The battery was part of No 19 Coast Artillery Group whose headquarters was at Lanwithan, Lostwithiel.

== Role of the battery ==
The role of the Coast Battery was:

i) The protection of the port and beaches against attack by sea or landings on the beaches;

ii) The protection of shipping in the approaches to the port;

iii) To form defended posts against landward attack;

iv) To deal with airborne troops landing in the vicinity;

v) To engage landward targets.

The seaward roles take precedence over all others and will be maintained up until the last moment.

The tasks of the battery in order of priority were:

i) Engagements of enemy transports and landing craft;

ii) Engagement of enemy warships attacking the port or defences;

iii) Engagement of targets on or adjacent to landing beaches;

iv) Support of the examination service where in force.

== CASLs ==
The battery was served by two Coastal Artillery Search Lights. One was positioned north of the battery and the other south on the southern side of St George's Cove. A generator house and fuel store were constructed in the Cove.

== Life of the battery ==
In 1940, the Garrison had 4 officers and 101 Other Ranks. The detachments of 21 men each were on duty for 24 hours from 1300 hours on one day to 1300 hours the next. The troops were billeted at Prideaux Place, Padstow which had sleeping accommodation for 120 men & 4 officers, a cookhouse & dining hall and an officer's mess & kitchen. Prideaux Place served as the Battery Headquarters. Water at the site was a problem and to begin with, the battery had to transport water for drinking and washing from Prideaux Place in dustbins. Later, the old Victorian water tank was cleaned and that was then used. In August 1940, an ADS Advance Dressing Station was set up at Tregirls Farm. Sick Parade was held daily at 1000 hours at the Fisherman's Institute in the town. On the night of 7 September 1940, the battery was at the utmost readiness following the issue of Codeword Cromwell, meaning invasion imminent. The Resident Naval Officer in overall charge of the defence of Padstow, Rear Admiral Gordon Campbell, V.C., and the officer in charge of the land forces, Lt Dare Wilson of the 8th Battalion Royal Northumberland Fusiliers, kept watch from the control bunker of the underwater minefield laid across the estuary. No invasion arrived. On Saturday 5 October 1940, Padstow was bombed at 8pm but the battery was not hit. Three people – three generations from one family - were killed in New Street, Padstow. Six houses were extensively damaged and 61 other buildings suffered minor damage. The fin of one of the bombs is on display at Padstow Museum. On 8 October 1940, Major Kirby, I.G., from Plymouth, arrived with a towing launch. Two rafts 20 yards apart were attached to the launch. The targets were engaged as they came into view from Pentire Head to Newland Rock. The average range was 4400 yards and five hits were registered out of 13 shots. On 15 February 1941, both guns fired 10 rounds practice shells together in 3 series at a single Hans Kay target pulled behind a launch travelling at a speed of about 10 knots. Six hits were registered. By May 1941, two War Shelters had been built to accommodate the Watch on Duty whilst the Reserve Watch slept in two huts erected at the bottom of the field by St George's Cove. In May 1942, the two naval guns were returned to sea to help in the Battle of the Atlantic. They left Padstow from the town railway station. They were replaced by two French 138mm naval guns. These required new gun houses. No 1 was built south of the old barbette and magazine. Its platform can easily be found today with mounting bolts still in place. No 2 was built just north of the old northern gun house and its location can easily be found by the ready use lockers that are still extant. The Battery Observation Post was also extended at this time. On 11 May 1942, both 138mm guns had been proofed and were ready for action. On 17 March 1943, the examination service was discontinued as such and the majority of Officers, NCO's and men were released for service overseas and the guns put into care and preservation. In November 1943, the strength was reduced to one NCO and two men and the ammunition removed to Fort Picklecombe for storage. The guns were removed in July 1945.

== Remains of the battery ==
Much of the 1870 barbette and No 1 Magazine can still be found at Gun Point, along with the large Victorian water tank. The 1940 concrete gun platform is still on top of the barbette although some of the concrete block cladding has fallen victim to coastal erosion. The gun platforms for the 1942 guns can still be found. No 2 Magazine still exists underground but has been filled so it is not accessible. The Engine House and Fuel shed still stand at St George's Cove. Prideaux Place still remains and is a tourist attraction and events venue today.

== In popular culture ==
Gun Point is referenced in Major Dare Wilson's autobiography ‘Tempting The Fates’, which details his work on preparing the landward defences for Padstow.

Gun Point is also referenced in the historical novel ‘No Small Stir’ by Cornish author Phil Hadley where Major Isaac Trevennel meets Rear Admiral Campbell to discuss the defences of Padstow.

== Gallery ==
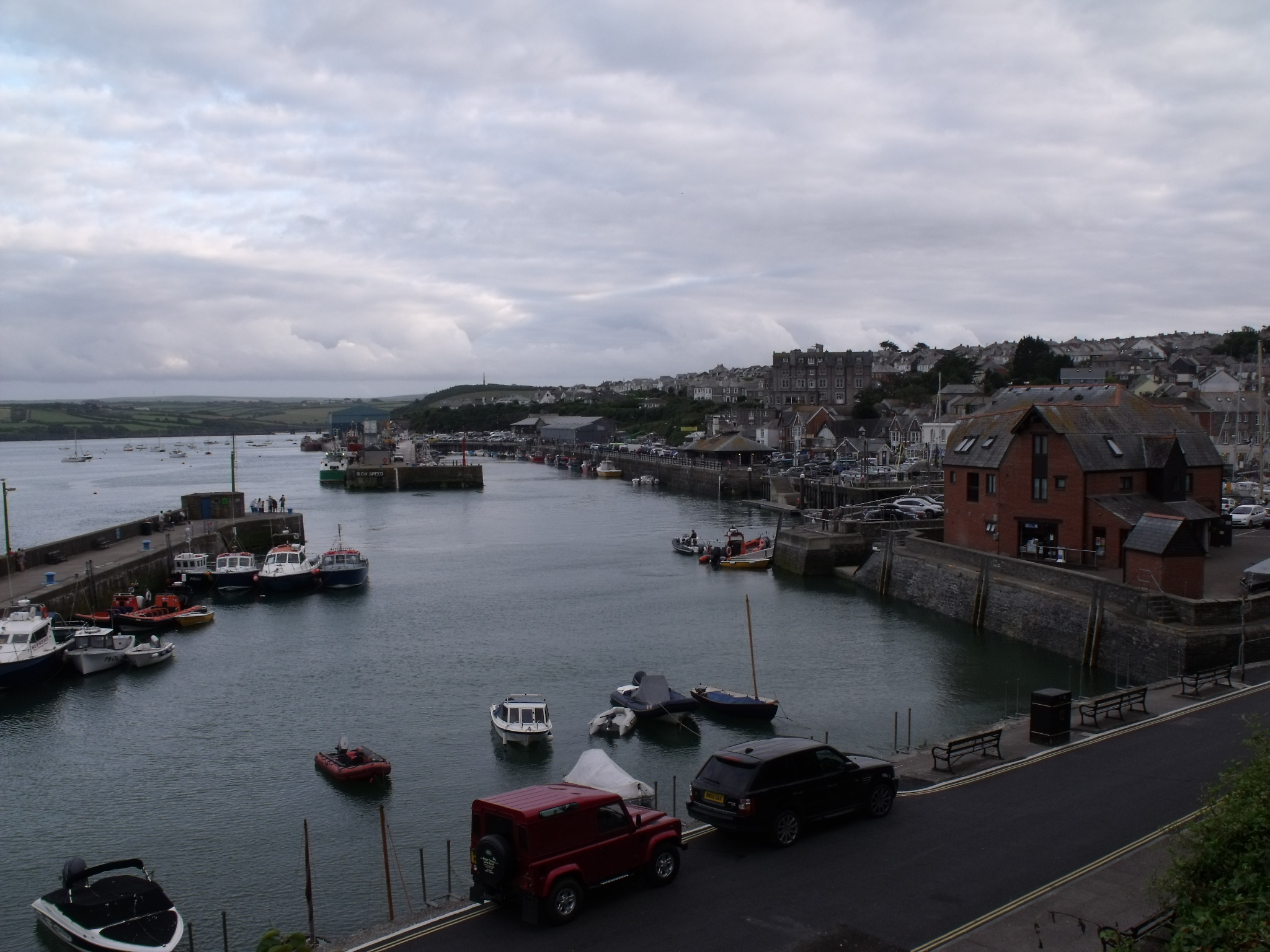
Padstow

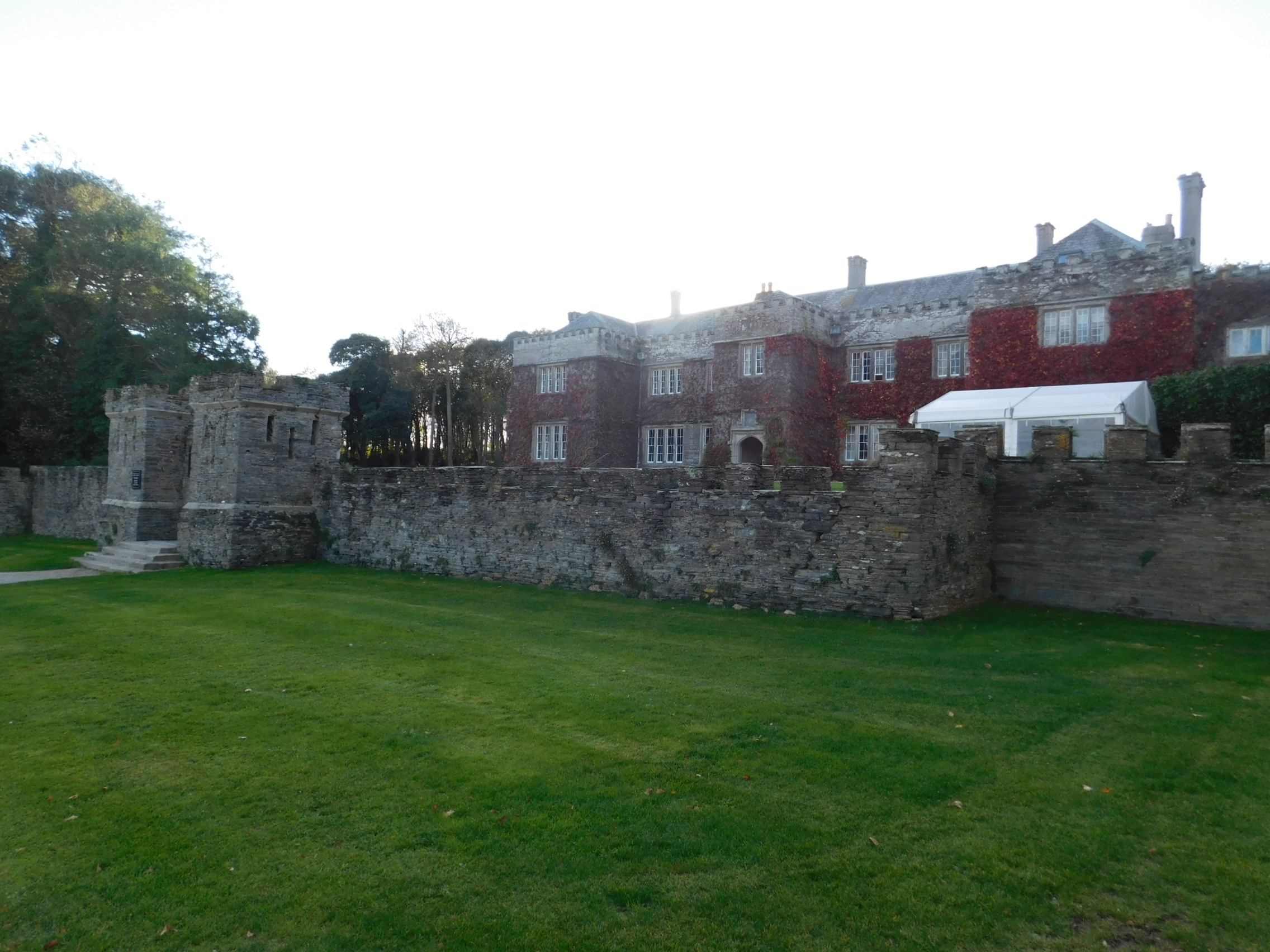
Prideaux Place

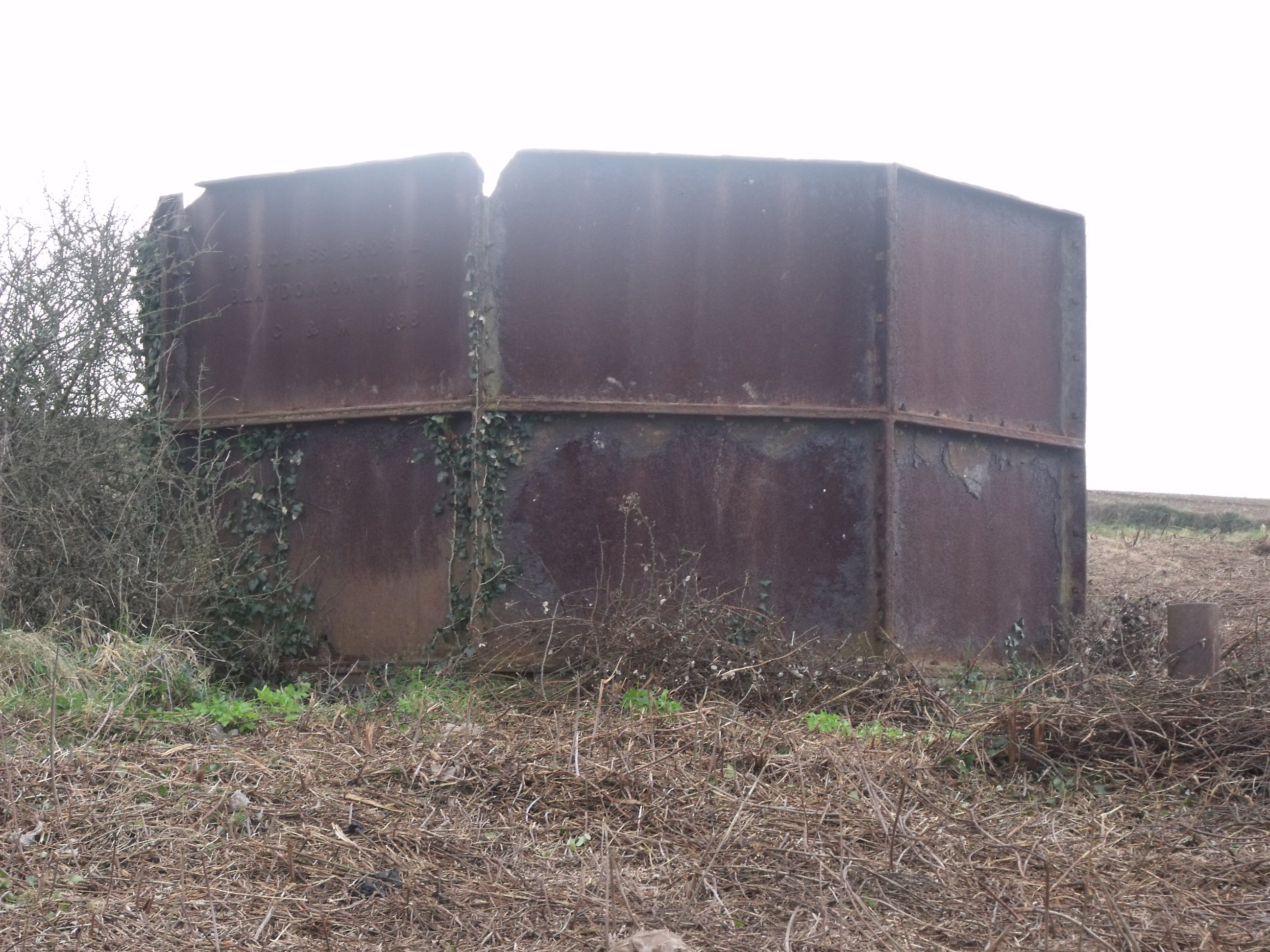
The Victorian water tank.

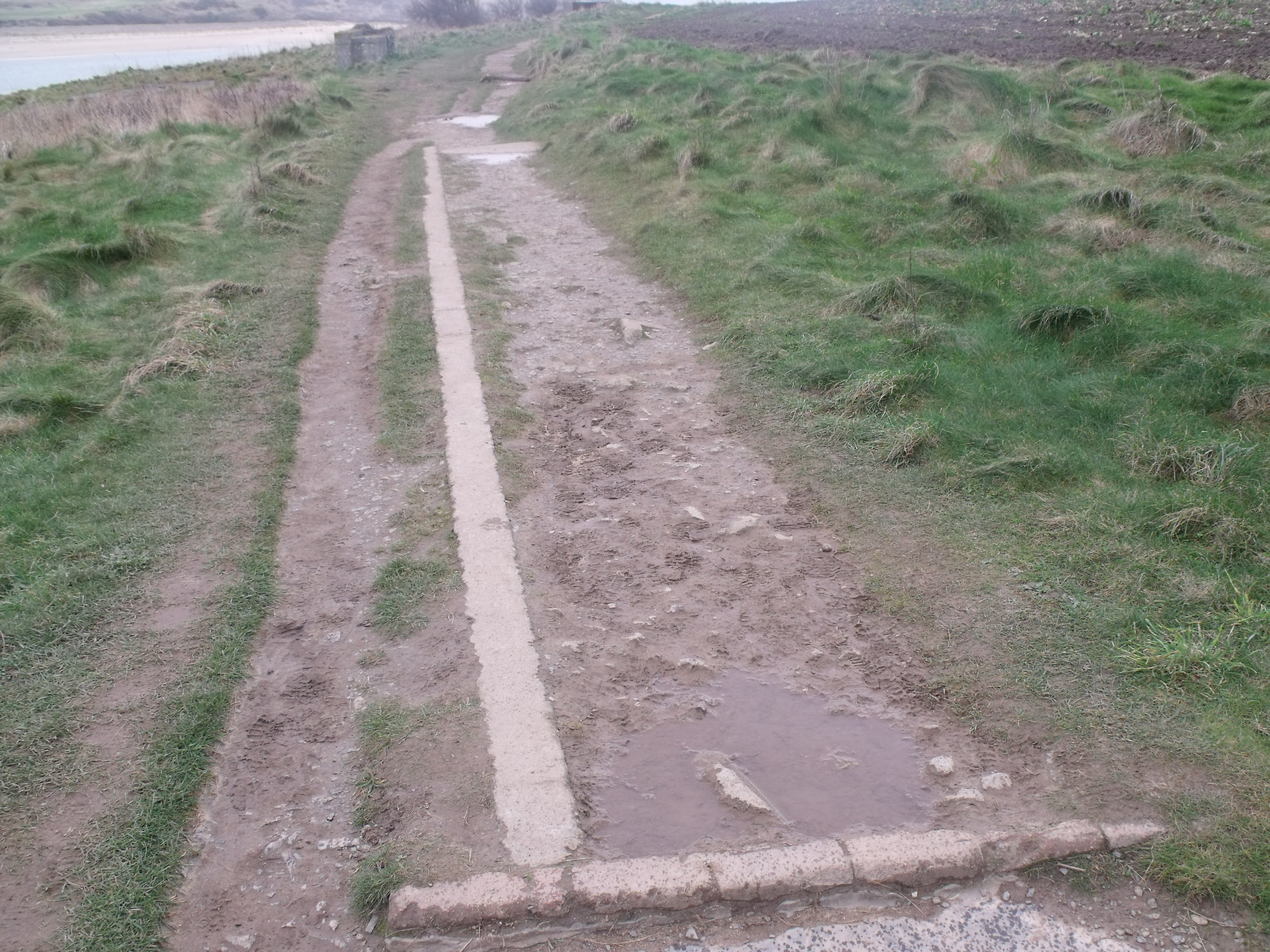
The filled-in steps to the magazine of gun number two.

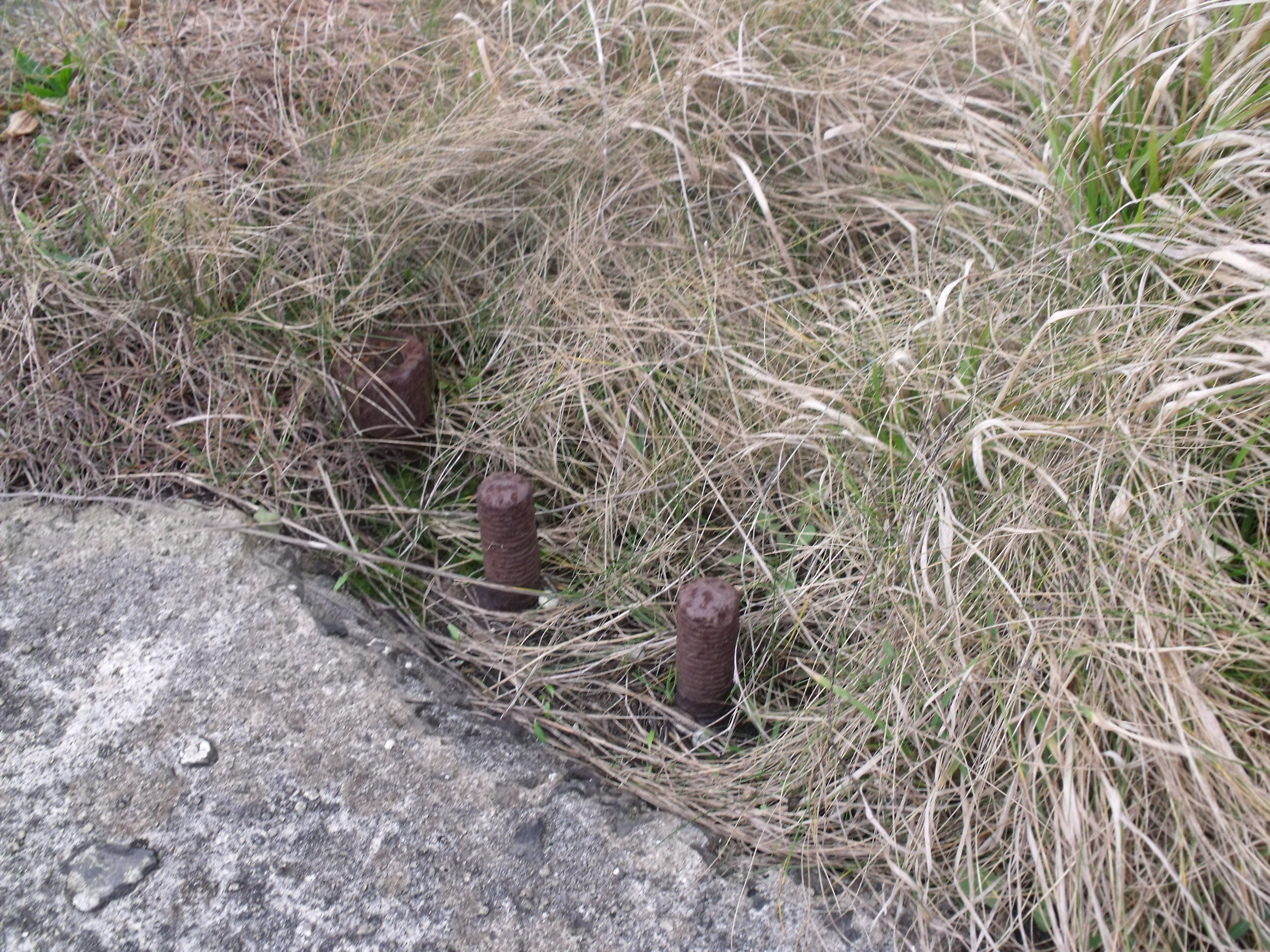
The mounting bolts of gun number one.

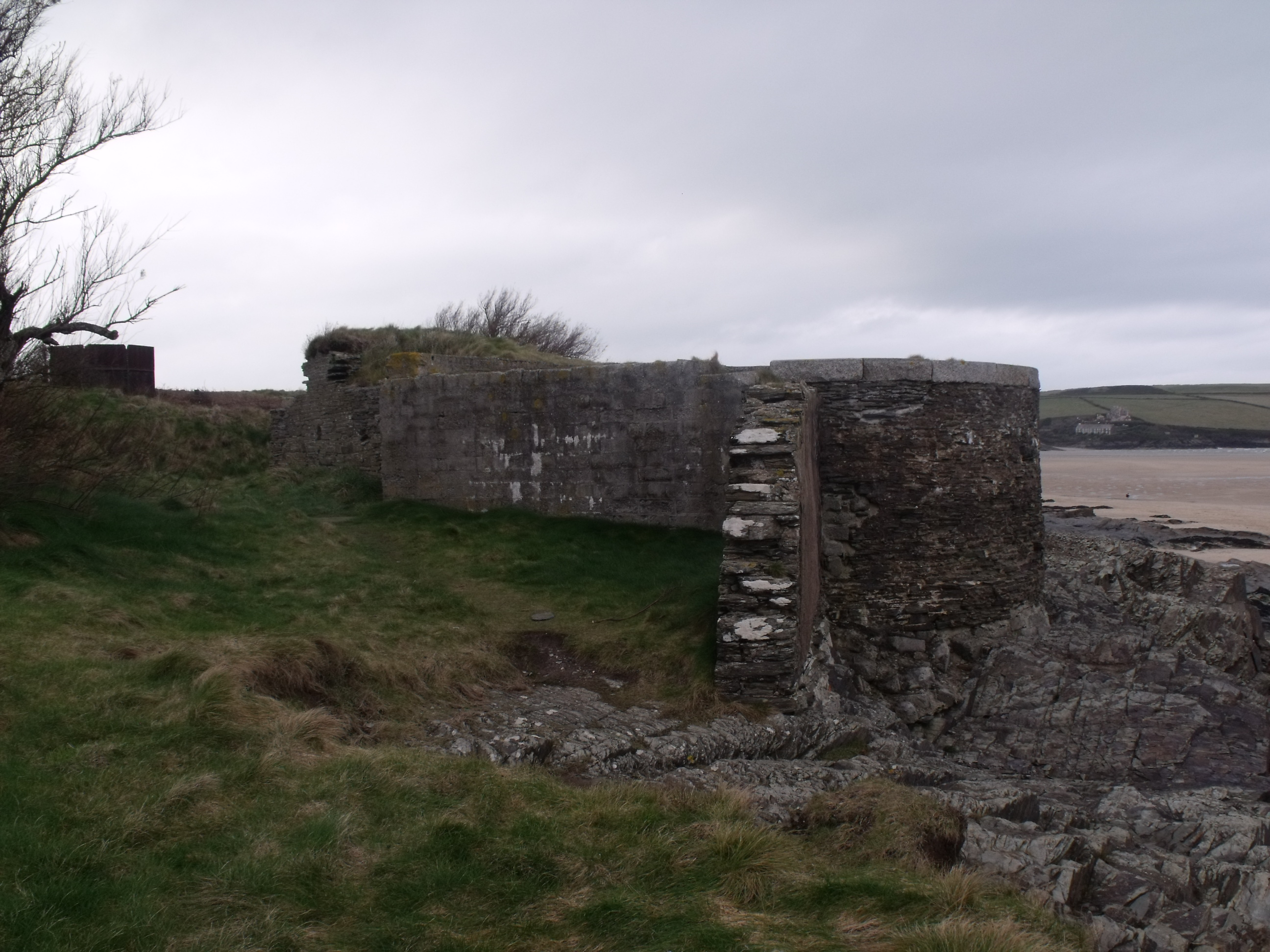
The barbette.

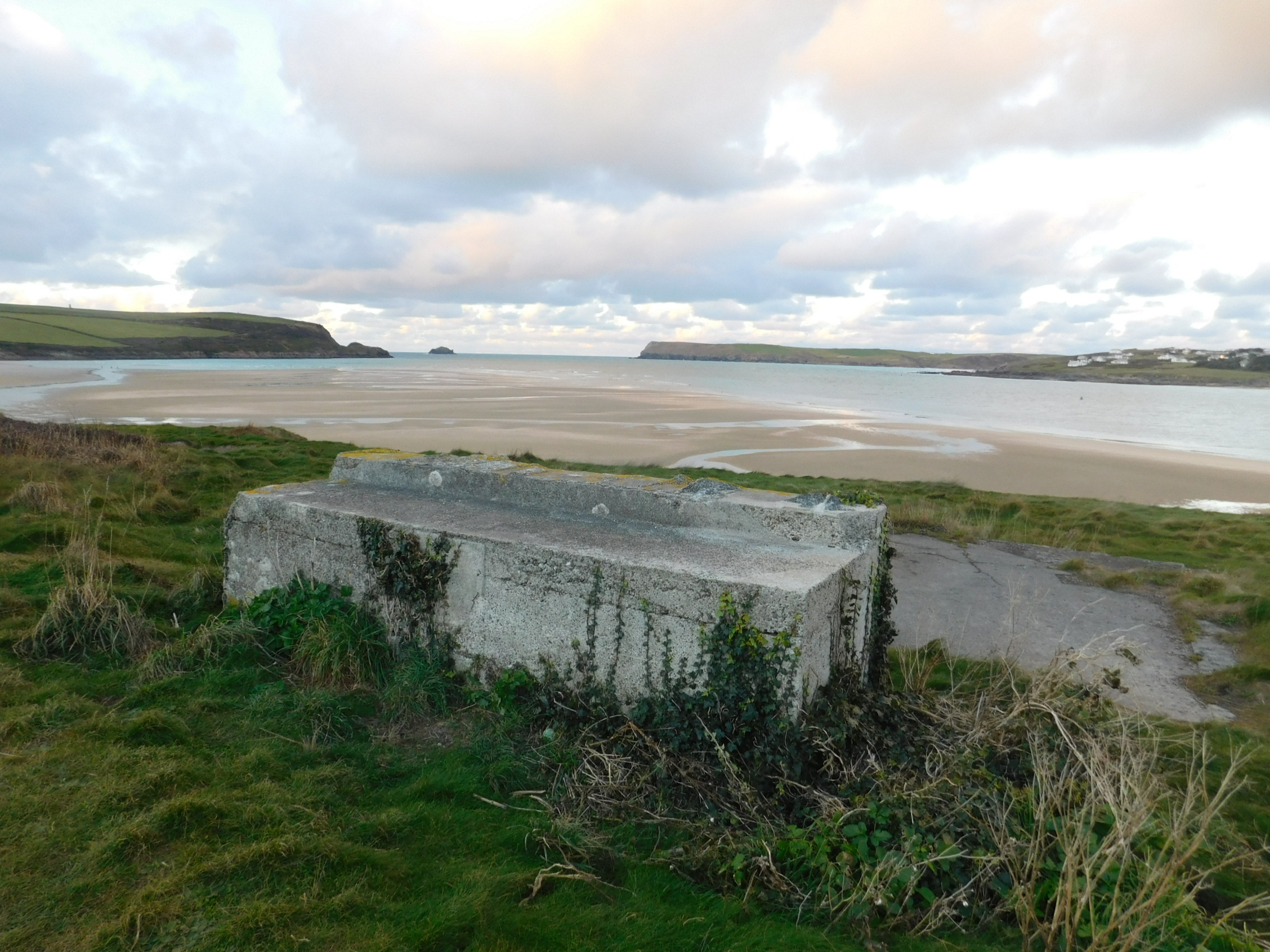
The ready use lockers for gun number two.

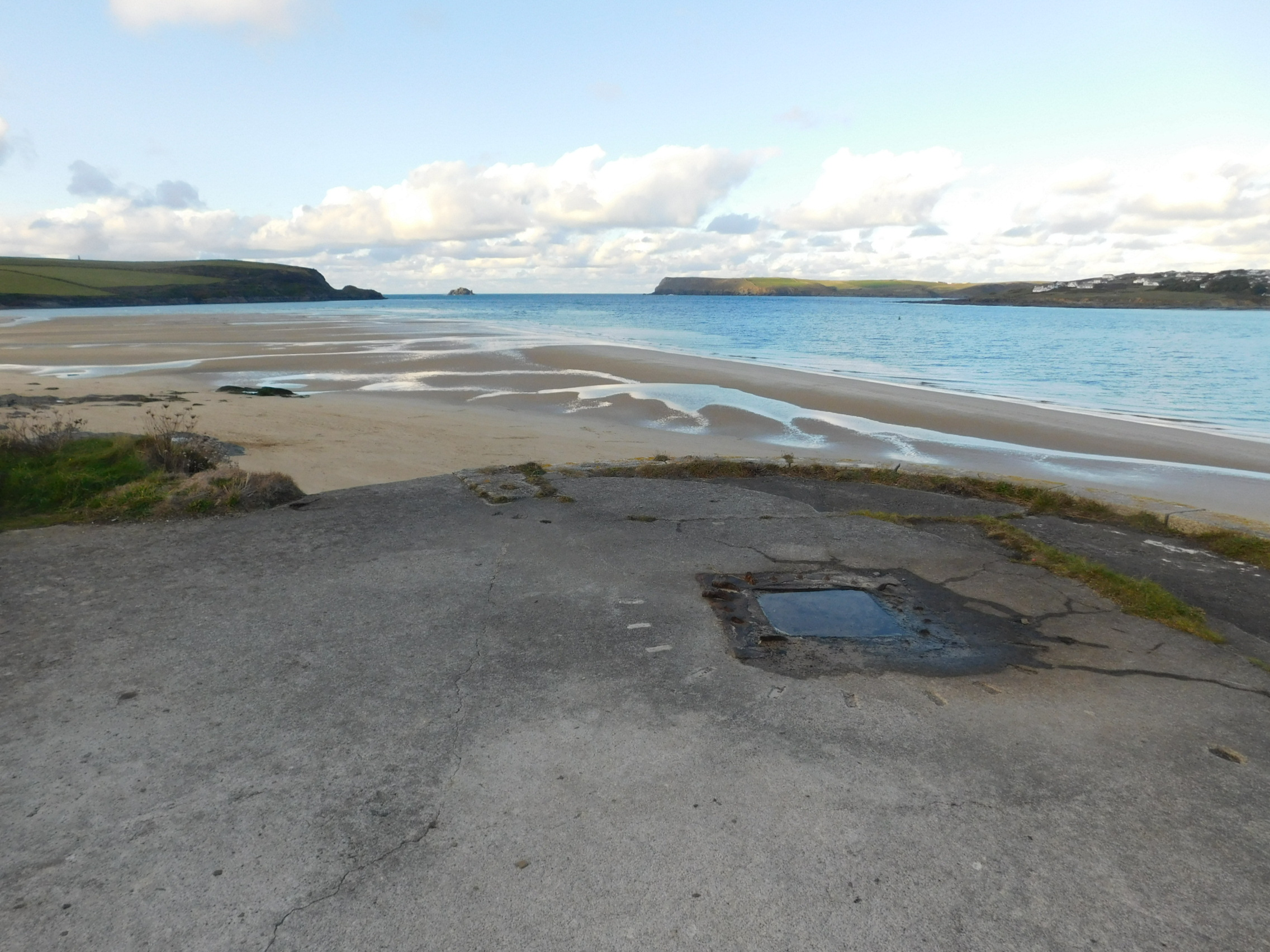
The mounting and gun platform of gun number one.
