= Thomas Bennet (grammarian) =

Grammarian and cleric

- Born: c.1645
- Died: 1681

Thomas Bennet (c.1645–1681), grammarian and cleric, was born at Windsor about 1645. His parentage is unknown. He was a Westminster scholar, and proceeded to Christ Church, Oxford, where he was entered in 1663; took his BA in 1666; and his MA 3 April 1669 .

Afterwards Bennet became corrector of the University Press. Dr. Fell, the dean of Christ Church, nominated Bennet on 29 December 1669, as candidate for the vacant post of architypographer, with which was then joined the superior beadleship of civil law. Bennet, thinking the appointment secure, did not go round to the masters, cap in hand, which was the usual manner of applying for their votes, and one Norton Bold obtained the post. A second attempt on the part of Fell to secure for Bennet the architypographership in October 1671 met with the same ill success. In 1673 Bennet published a grammar in octavo, called Many Useful Observations by way of Comment out of Antient and Learned Grammarians on Lilly's Grammar, Oxford. This work, from its birthplace, became known as the Oxford Grammar, and sometimes, from Fell's patronage, as Dr. Fell's Grammar; and Bennet was styled the Oxford Grammarian. He took holy orders after his second rebuff, and obtained the livings of Steventon by Abingdon, and Hungerford. Here he died in August 1681, and there he was buried.

What Bennet did for (Latin) grammar was to make 'more easie and more compleat . . . the rules of Lilie's "Propria quæ maribus" and "As in praesenti"', and Twells, who was a schoolmaster at Newark-upon-Trent, publishing his book in 1683 (unaware apparently of Bennet's death two years before), alluding to him as the Oxford Grammarian, and hoping he would 'speedily apply both his head and hand to "remedy" the grand inconveniences of the "Quæ genus" and Syntax'. (Note: Wood's Ath. Ox. volume iii. col. 883) (Note: Wood's Fasti (Bliss), volume iv. cols. 289, 307) (Note: Welch's Alumni Westmonasterienses, page 154) (Note: John Twells's Grammatica Reformata, 1683, preface 26.)
