= E. W. Cocks =

British painter

- Born: c. 1803
- Occupations: Painter, scenic artist at Vauxhall Gardens
- Known for: Paintings of balloon ascents

Edward William Cocks (born c. 1803) was a British painter employed as a scenic artist at Vauxhall Gardens. He is now known for his paintings of balloon ascents.

== Dioramas ==
Large-scale painting was an innovation at Vauxhall Gardens tried in 1823, with a 24 metre high picture of the Bay of Naples as an attraction, used as background for a firework display. In 1828 Cocks showed a six-picture diorama at Vauxhall Gardens, on the River Rhine. He presented also a "Hydroptic Exhibition" at the Gardens, in a tradition of elaborate water features set by R. Morris, who worked for the stage with Charles Dibdin the younger. Involving fire as well as water, it was an allegory of naval supremacy. Advertising for the season's opening that year included "The Scenery, with various paintings and many New Cosmoramas, dispersed about the Gardens, by Mr. Cocks and Assistants."

In 1834 the Gardens celebrated the return of the second Ross expedition with a display including allegorical icebergs, advertised as "Principal Artist:Mr. Cocks, Principal Machinist:Mr. Lowe". For the Arctic display or "cosmorama", Cocks and three assistants worked from Ross's own drawings. In 1836 Cocks painted a diorama of the new Palace of Westminster for the Gardens. The year 1838 saw a revival of the Ross panorama with its whales, bears and intrepid boat expeditions.

Facing financial difficulties, Frederick Gye sold Vauxhall Gardens in 1840. In 1841 was advertised a cosmorama of "the Embarkation of the Body of Napoleon" and "the Bombardment of Acre" painted by "Mr. Cocks". It was at the Royal Gallery of Practical Science, Adelaide Street, London. Known as the Adelaide Gallery, this early technology museum had been set up in 1832, by a group including Jacob Perkins and Thomas Telford.

== Balloon ascents ==
On 7 November 1836 Charles Green set off from Vauxhall Garden on a balloon ascent that broke current records. It lasted 18 hours, and the party of three including Thomas Monck Mason and Robert Hollond, landed in Weilburg, Duchy of Nassau in Germany the next day, having travelled 500 miles. Cocks was commissioned to paint a set of six commemorative pictures. Paintings relating to the flight were left to the Science Museum, London by Winifred Penn-Gaskell. He also was involved the fatal ascent and jump of Robert Cocking the following year. Cocks painted Cocking's parachute, for the attempt of 24 June 1837.

== Works ==
One of the paintings held by the Science Museum, Balloon Leaving Dover (1840) relates to the 1785 balloon ascent of Jean-Pierre Blanchard and John Jeffries. Of the set of six directly representing the Weilburg flight, four were in a private collection in 1957, when they were offered for sale. At that point it was suggested that the set had been commissioned by Richard Hollond.
