= Prideaux (name) =

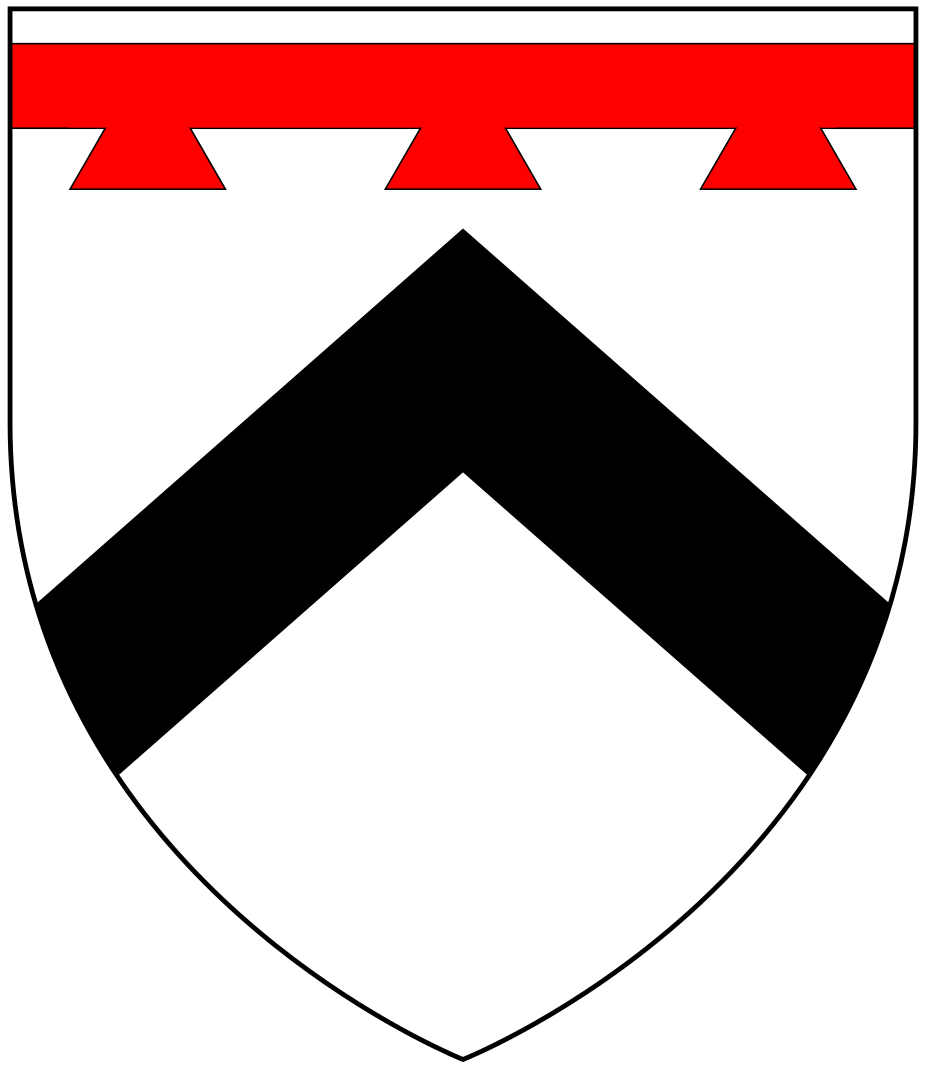
Arms of Prideaux family of Devon & Cornwall: Argent, a chevron sable in chief a label of three points gules

Prideaux is both a given name and surname of Cornish origin, derived from the place called Prideaux in the parish of Luxulyan. The place-name had the form Pridias in the 12th and 13th centuries; by folk etymology both the place-name and the surname have been altered to a form based on the French près d'eaux or pré d'eaux (near waters or meadow of waters).

Notable people with the name include:

== Surname ==
- Prideaux (surname)

== Given name ==
- Prideaux Lightfoot (1836–1906), British Anglican priest
- Prideaux Selby (1747–1813), English soldier and politician
- Prideaux John Selby (1788–1867), English ornithologist, botanist and natural history artist

== Families ==
- Prideaux baronets, family

The ancient gentry family of Prideaux was seated variously at Orcheton, Modbury; Adeston, Holbeton; Thuborough, Sutcombe; Soldon, Holsworthy; Netherton, Farway; Ashburton; Nutwell, Woodbury; Ford Abbey, Thorncombe all in Devon, and at Prideaux Place, Padstow and Prideaux manor, Luxulyan, in Cornwall. Fox (1874) stated in regard of the Kingsbridge branch of Prideaux: "We have no intention ... of tracing the pedigree back to old Paganus de Prideaux, who came over from Normandy with William the Conqueror, and who was Lord of the Castle of Prideaux, in Cornwall".

== In fiction ==
- Jim Prideaux, a mid-level British intelligence agent in John le Carré's Tinker Tailor Soldier Spy (1974)

== See also ==
- Hingston & Prideaux
