= Prideaux =

Prideaux may refer to:

- One of several persons with the surname Prideaux; see Prideaux (surname)
- Prideaux Castle, an Iron Age hillfort near St Blazey, Cornwall, England, United Kingdom
- Prideaux Place, a country house near Padstow, Cornwall, England, United Kingdom
- William Prideaux Courtney (1845–1913), English biographer
