= Prideaux (surname) =

Prideaux is a surname, and may refer to:

- Brandon Prideaux (born 1976), American soccer player and coach
- Editha Greville Prideaux (1866–1954), New Zealand artist
- Edmund Prideaux (artist) (1693–1745), English architectural artist
- Edmund Prideaux (MP for Taunton) (1634–1702) English Member of Parliament, participant in Monmouth's Rebellion
- Edmund Prideaux (Roundhead) (died 1659), English lawyer and Member of Parliament, solicitor-general and attorney-general
- Sir Edmund Prideaux, 1st Baronet of Netherton (1554–1628), English lawyer
- Sir Edmund Prideaux, 4th Baronet (1647–1720), British lawyer and politician
- Frances Helen Prideaux (1858–1885), British physician
- Humphrey Prideaux (1648–1724), English churchman and orientalist
- James Prideaux (1927–2015), American playwright
- James Prideaux (footballer), Australian rules footballer
- John Prideaux (1578–1650), English academic and Bishop of Worcester
- John Prideaux (MP died 1403) (c.1347–1403), English Member of Parliament
- John Prideaux (by 1520 – 1558), English Member of Parliament
- John Prideaux (British Army officer) (1718–1759), British general
- Jonathan Prideaux (died 1637), English politician
- Jonathan Prideaux (died 1710) (c.1646–1710), English politician
- Sir Peter Prideaux, 3rd Baronet (1626–1705), English politician
- Rhiannon Prideaux, British human rights worker
- Richard Prideaux (1606–1667), English politician
- Roger Prideaux (born 1939), English cricketer
- Roger Prideaux (MP) (by 1524–1582), MP for Totnes (1545–1553)
- Sarah Prideaux (1853–1933), British bookbinder and author
- Sue Prideaux, Anglo-Norwegian novelist and biographer
- Walter Prideaux (1806–1889), English poet and lawyer
- Walter Prideaux, banker and partner in Hingston & Prideaux
- Walter Prideaux (rower) (1910–1995), English rower
- W. F. Prideaux (1840–1914), British scholar on the ancient Kingdom of Sheba
