= Walter Prideaux =

British poet (1806–1889)

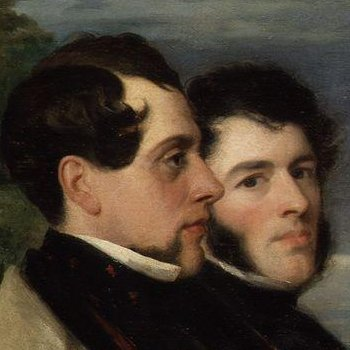
- Prideaux (left) and John Hollins from a painting by Hollins
- Born: 1806
- Died: 1889 (aged 82–83)
- Occupation: Lawyer
- Known for: Poetry
- Spouse: Elizabeth Williams
- Children: four

Walter Prideaux (1806–1889) was an English poet and lawyer. He rose to be clerk to Goldsmiths' Hall.

== Origins ==
Walter Prideaux was born 15 April 1806, at Bearscombe near Kingsbridge and Loddiswell, one of the six sons of Walter Prideaux (d. 1832) of Kingsbridge and Plymouth, a partner in the Devon and Cornwall Bank, a Quaker associated with the Plymouth Brethren, having in 1812 sold Bearscombe and moved to Plymouth. It is not clear what relation he was to the ancient gentry family of Prideaux seated variously at Orcheton, Modbury; Adeston, Holbeton; Thuborough, Sutcombe; Soldon, Holsworthy; Netherton, Farway; Ashburton; Nutwell, Woodbury; Ford Abbey, Thorncombe all in Devon, and at Prideaux Place, Padstow, and Prideaux manor, Luxulyan, in Cornwall. The wife of Walter Prideaux (Senior) was Sarah-Ball Hingston, a daughter of his partner Joseph Hingston (1764-1835) (Senior), merchant, of Dodbrooke (adjacent to Kingsbridge) in Devon, by his first wife Sarah Ball (d.1790), a daughter of Joseph Ball of Bridgwater in Somerset.

== Career ==
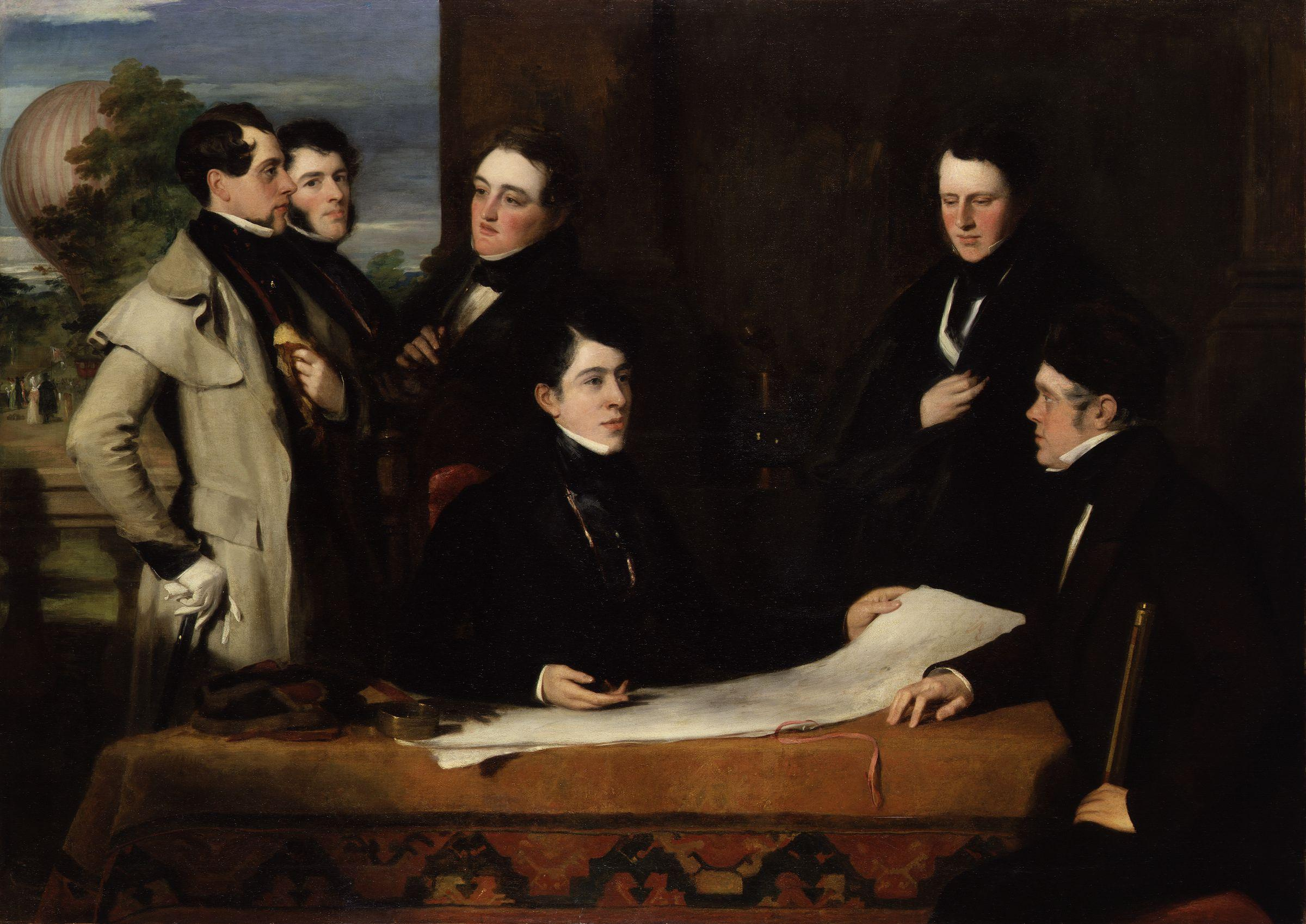
A Consultation prior to the Aerial Voyage to Weilburgh, 1836, a painting by John Hollins. The people can be identified using a cursor.

Prideaux is shown in a painting where discussions are taking place for a journey in a balloon by Charles Green, Thomas Monck Mason and Robert Hollond. The three travelled a record distance of 500 miles in 18 hours. Prideaux was included in the painting with the artist, John Hollins, and William Milbourne James.

In 1840, Prideaux's poems were published as Poems of Chivalry, Faery, and the Olden Time

== Death ==
Prideaux died in 1889.
