= Balloon hoax =

Balloon hoax may refer to:

- The Balloon-Hoax (1844)
- Balloon boy hoax (2009)
