= William Hollins =

British architect

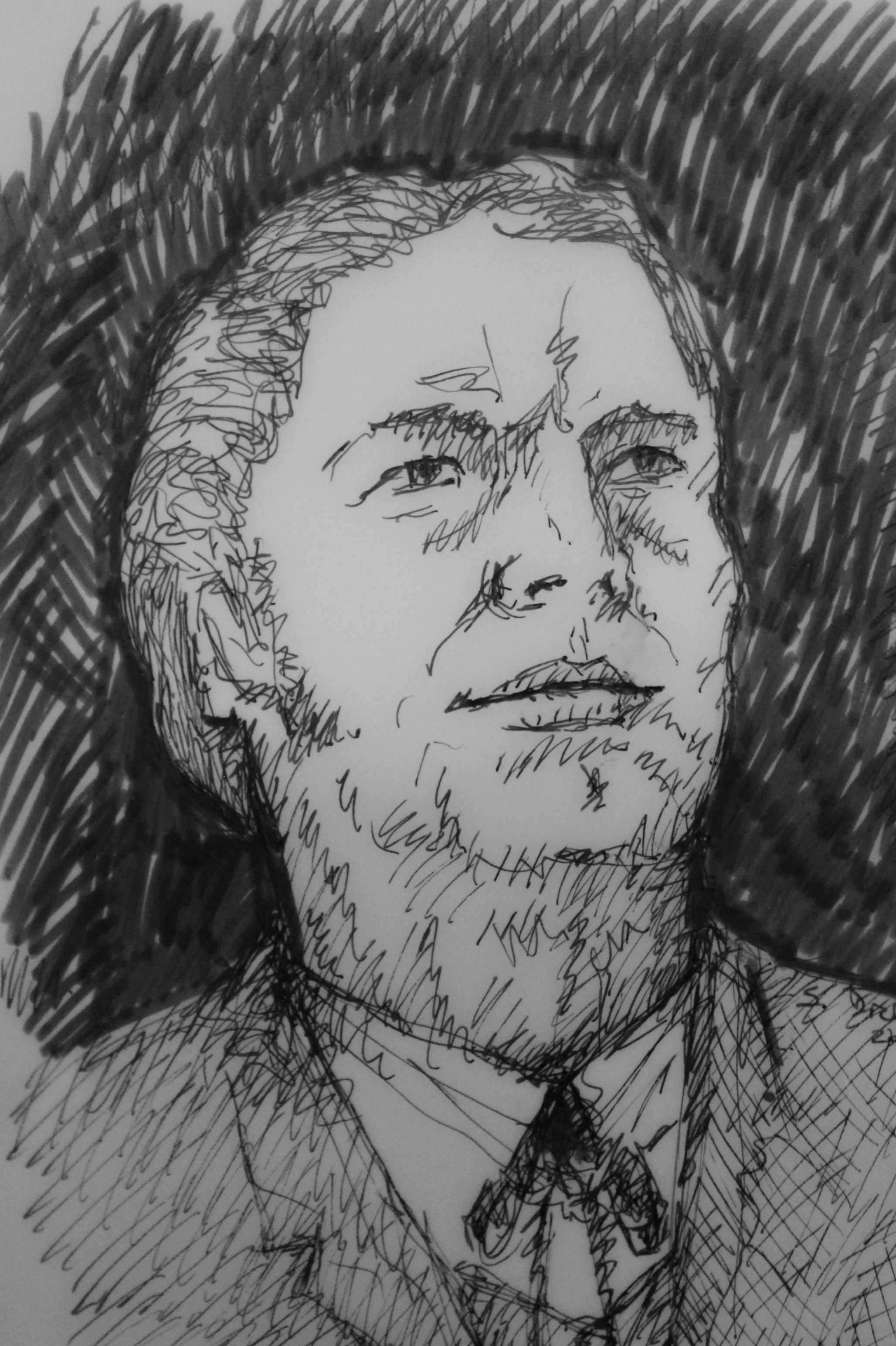
William Hollins

William Hollins (18 March 1763 – 12 January 1843) was an 18th/19th century English architect and sculptor. His work is largely in the Greek Revival and Gothic styles.

== Life ==
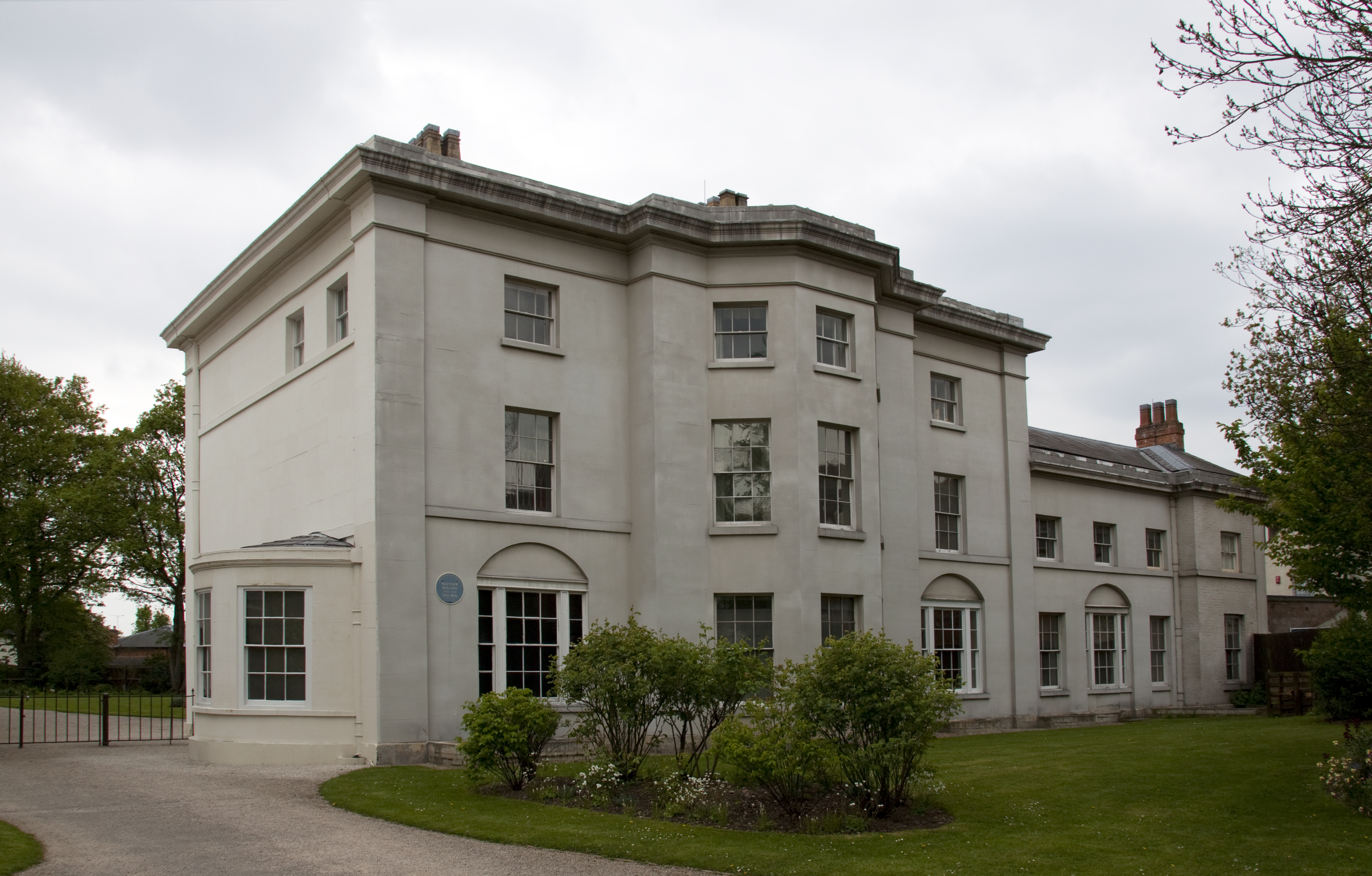
Soho House, Handsworth, Birmingham

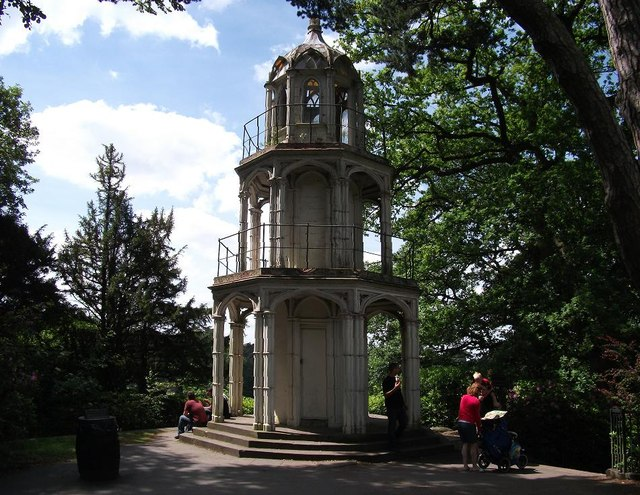
Alton Towers Gothic Tower

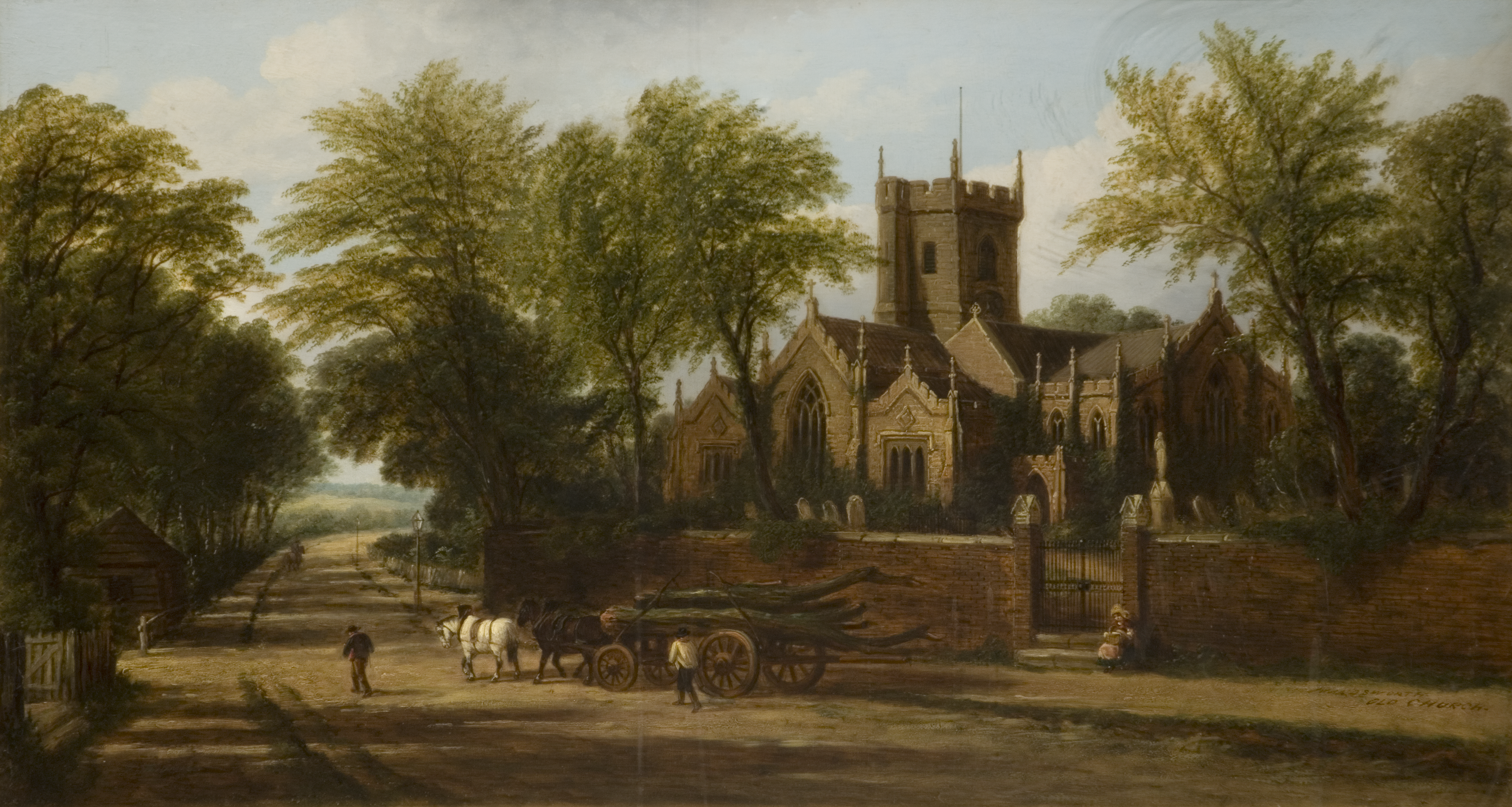
Handsworth Parish Church

He was born in Shifnal in Shropshire on 18 March 1763 the son of John and Mary Hollins. He was originally apprenticed as a stonemason then went to London to train as an architect, specifically studying Vitruvius. He is known to have assisted George Saunders on his Theatre Royal project on New Street in 1793. He then set up his own practice in Birmingham around 1795.

By 1800 he was living at 17 Great Hampton Street in Birmingham. In 1806 he lost a prestigious commission for a memorial to Horatio Nelson in the centre of Birmingham which was instead won by Richard Westmacott.

He exhibited at the Royal Academy from 1821 to 1825.

He died at home in Great Hampton Street on 12 January 1843 aged 79. He is buried in the churchyard of St Paul's Church, Birmingham. The grave is marked by a granite obelisk. An ornate memorial window inside the church holds a bust of William Hollins by his son Peter, who also became a sculptor.

== Architectural works ==
- Soho House, Birmingham remodelling for Matthew Boulton (c.1795)
- Library on Union Street, Birmingham (1798) demolished
- Remodelling of Saint Petersburg Mint in Russia (c.1800)
- Christ Church, Birmingham (1805) excluding spire
- Public Office and prison on Moor Street. Birmingham (1805) later called Moor street Lock Up
- General Dispensary on Union Street (1806) only his statue of Hygeia from the building survives
- Egyptian Conduit, Bull Ring, Birmingham (1807) this was a private commission to hide an ugly water conduit and was also known as "Pratchett's Folly" it was widely unpopular
- St. Austin's Church, Birmingham (1809)
- Gothic Tower and other garden structures in gardens at Alton Towers (c.1810)
- Union Mill on Grosvenor Street, Birmingham (1813)
- Gothic remodelling of Handsworth Parish Church (1820)
- Remodelling of St Paul's Church, Birmingham (c.1820)
- Almshouses on Warner St, Bordesley (1831) demolished

== Monuments and Sculptures ==
- Memorial to James Johnstone, Worcester Cathedral (1802)
- Memorial to William Holden, Wednesbury Parish Church (1806)
- Memorial to William Withering, Chester Cathedral (1808)
- Coat of Arms (Modern and Ancient Guns) on the Gun Barrel House on Banbury Street, Birmingham (1813)
- Grave of the Venerable Edmund Outram in Birmingham Cathedral (1821)
- Statue of the late Catherine Jenner for Edward Jenner (1840)

== Publications ==
Hollins made a precise study of the principles of carving in relation to Roman lettering: this was published under the title of "The British Standard of the Capital Letters contained in the Roman Alphabet". This is one of the first uses of the term "British Standard". It is one of the few books looking at the craft of letter carving.

== Family ==
He was married to Catherine (d.1831). They had many children.

His eldest son William Hollins (1788-1831) was also a sculptor and worked in his father's studio. He was an organist at St Paul's Church.

He was father to the sculptor Peter Hollins and uncle to the artist John Hollins.

Thomas his son was also a stonemason.

His youngest daughter "Mrs Bown" cared for him in later life and died in 1891.
