= Peter Hollins (sculptor) =

English sculptor

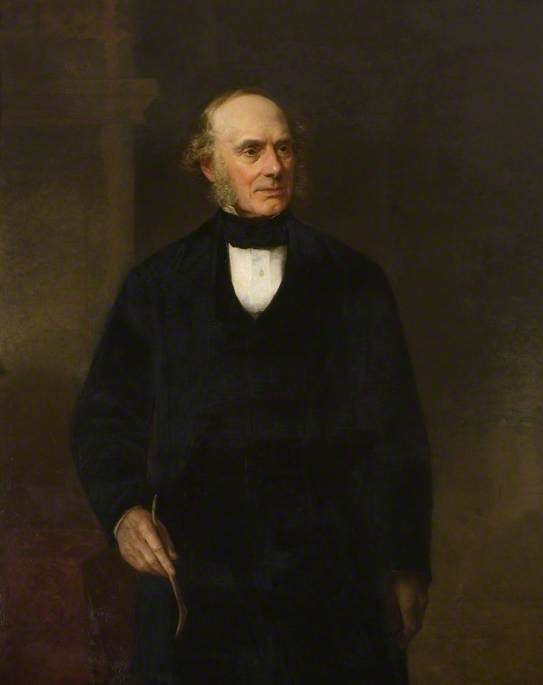
- Born: 1 May 1800
- Died: 16 August 1886
- Occupation: Sculptor

Peter Hollins (1 May 1800 – 16 August 1886) was an English sculptor associated with both classical and Romantic traditions. Based primarily in Birmingham, he produced more than sixty major works, including ecclesiastical, architectural, and public sculpture, and was responsible for statues of Sir Robert Peel and Dr Jephson. Although less widely known than some contemporaries due to working largely outside London, his best work has been regarded as comparable in quality to that of Francis Chantrey. Hollins played a central role in Birmingham’s artistic life as a long-serving vice-president of the Royal Birmingham Society of Artists (RBSA) and was instrumental in securing its Royal Charter in 1868.

== Early life and family ==
Hollins was born on 1 May 1800 at 17 Great Hampton Street, Birmingham, the fourth child and eldest son of the sculptor and architect William Hollins and his wife, Catherine. Several members of his family were involved in artistic pursuits, including his cousin John Hollins, the son of a Birmingham glass painter, who achieved success as a painter of portraits and historical subjects in London.

== Training and early career ==
Hollins studied drawing under Vincent Barber and sculpture in his father’s studio before moving to London in 1822 to work for Francis Chantrey. He assisted Chantrey with the installation of his portrait of James Watt in the Watt Memorial Chapel at St Mary’s Church, Handsworth.

While in London, Hollins shared a studio in Old Bond Street with fellow Birmingham artist Henry Room. He held an exhibition of his work there in 1831, which included a sculptural group entitled Conrad and Medora, illustrating a scene from The Corsair by Lord Byron. The work won the Sir Robert Lawley Award at the Birmingham Society of Arts, reaffirming Hollins’ close links with his native city.

== Mature career ==
Hollins visited Italy around 1835 and returned to Birmingham in 1843 to take over his father’s studio on Great Hampton Street in the Jewellery Quarter. In 1839, he competed unsuccessfully for the Lord Nelson Memorial commission for Trafalgar Square, which was awarded to Edward Hodges Baily.

Showing both classical and Romantic influences, Hollins produced more than sixty major works. These included statuary at Malvern Priory, Bodelwyddan Castle, the Royal College of Surgeons, and Weston Park. He also sculpted public statues of Sir Robert Peel in Birmingham and Dr Jephson in Jephson Gardens, Leamington Spa.

Although less well known due to being based outside London for much of his career, Hollins’ best work has been considered equal in quality to that of Chantrey. His cousin John Hollins moved to London to paint portraits and later became an associate of the Royal Academy.

== Later life and institutional role ==
Hollins served as vice-president of the Royal Birmingham Society of Artists for 37 years and also exhibited at the Royal Academy. He taught modelling for the Birmingham Society of Artists and was instrumental in securing the Society’s Royal Charter in 1868.

Despite his long association with Birmingham, Hollins expressed disappointment that the city had been slow to recognise and make use of his talents as a sculptor. He wrote:

“I wish to draw a veil over my labours for my native town, as they were a grievous disappointment to me, and the more than Egyptian darkness and ignorance of that branch of art which I had chosen was simply appalling.”

== Death ==
Hollins ceased stone sculpture later in life due to rheumatism, possibly caused by prolonged work with wet clay in a cold studio. He died at his birthplace, 17 Great Hampton Street, Birmingham, on 16 August 1886.

== Main works ==
see

- Statue of Henry Paget, 1st Marquess of Anglesey (1825) exhibited at the Royal Academy
- Bust of Edward Grainger (1825) for the Royal College of Surgeons in London
- Bust of Charles Lloyd (1831) for Birmingham General Hospital
- Statue of a Seated Girl (1841), the subject may be a girl named Catherine Sarah Jenner, now in the collection of Reading Museum
- Bust of Felix Mendelssohn (1850) for Birmingham Town Hall
- Bust of William Congreve Russell (1853) exhibited at Birmingham Society of Arts
- Statue of Robert Peel (1855) in Calthorpe Park in Birmingham
- Statue of Thomas Attwood (1859) in Calthorpe Park in Birmingham
- Statue of Rowland Hill (1868) originally in Birmingham Exchange, moved to Birmingham GPO in 1874 and to GPO headquarters in 1891 (lost following storage in WW2)

== Funerary monuments ==
- Sir Henry Wakeman (1831, including bust) in Claines Church in Worcester.
- Ornate surround to stained glass window (c.1845 including bust) to his father William Hollins in St Paul's Church, Birmingham
- Memorial to the Officers and Men of the 80th Regiment of Foot (Staffordshire Volunteers) (1850) in Lichfield Cathedral
- John Hollins (1855) his cousin, buried in Kensal Green Cemetery
- John Badley (1870) in St Edmund's Church in Dudley
