= Robert Cocking =

British inventor

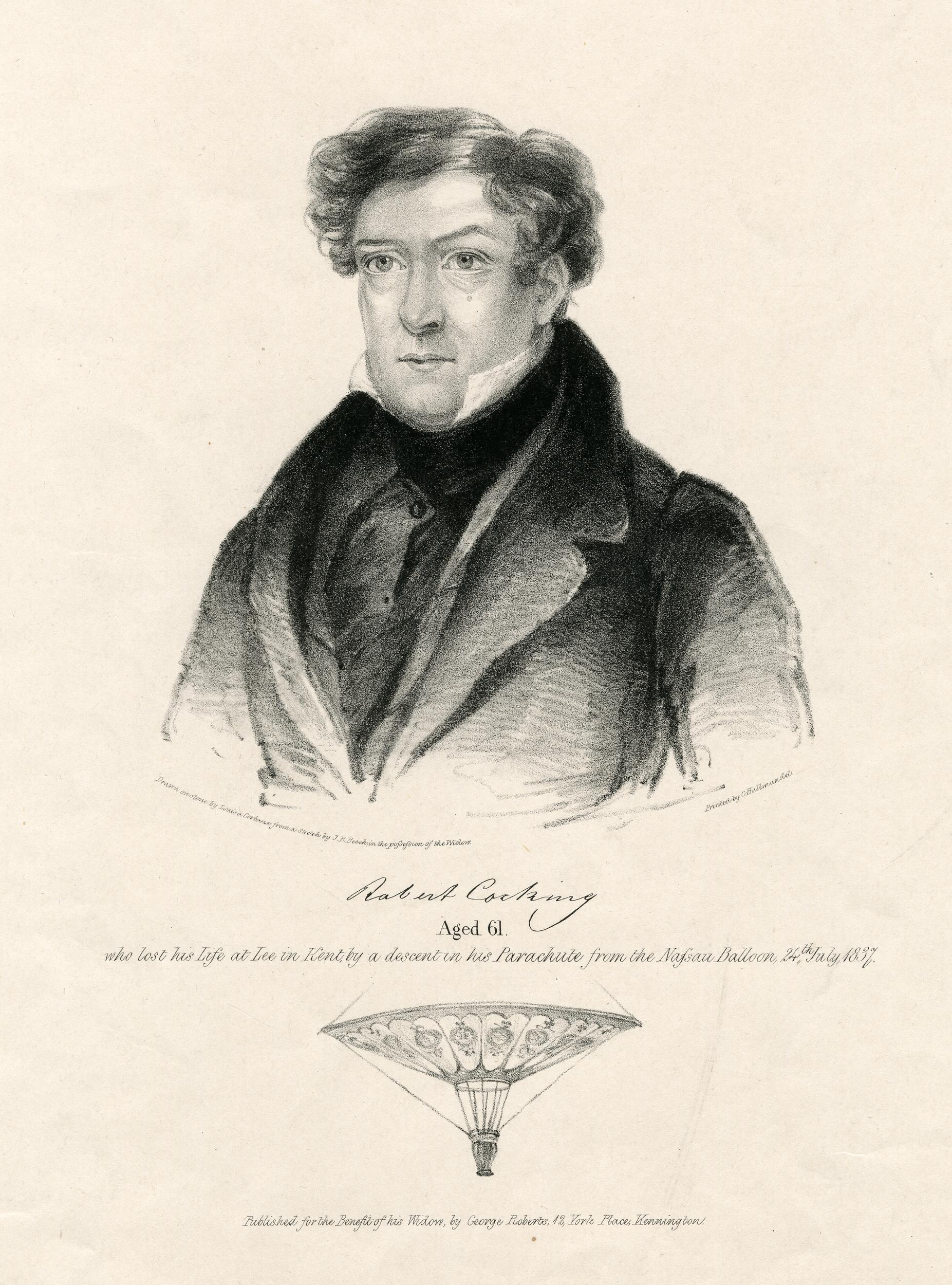
Robert Cocking

Robert Cocking (1776 – 24 July 1837) was a British watercolour artist who died in the first known fatal parachute accident.

== Parachute design ==
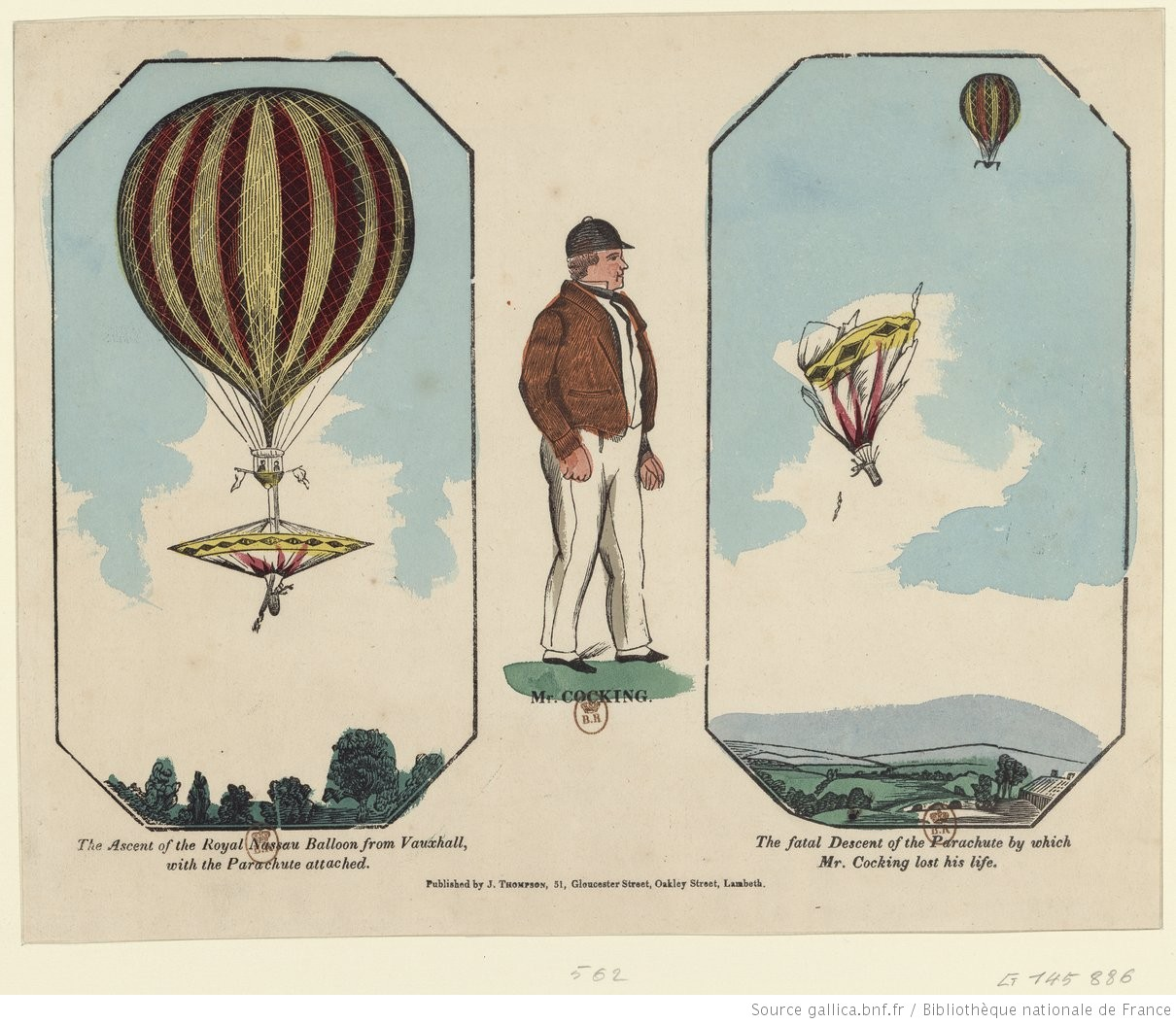
The Ascent of the Royal Nassau Balloon from Vauxhall, with the Parachute attached.

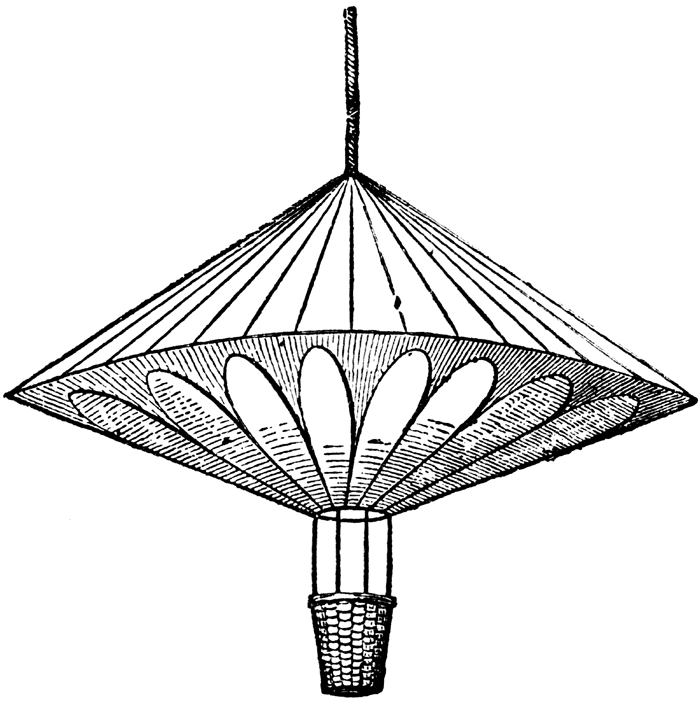
Cocking's ill-fated parachute design

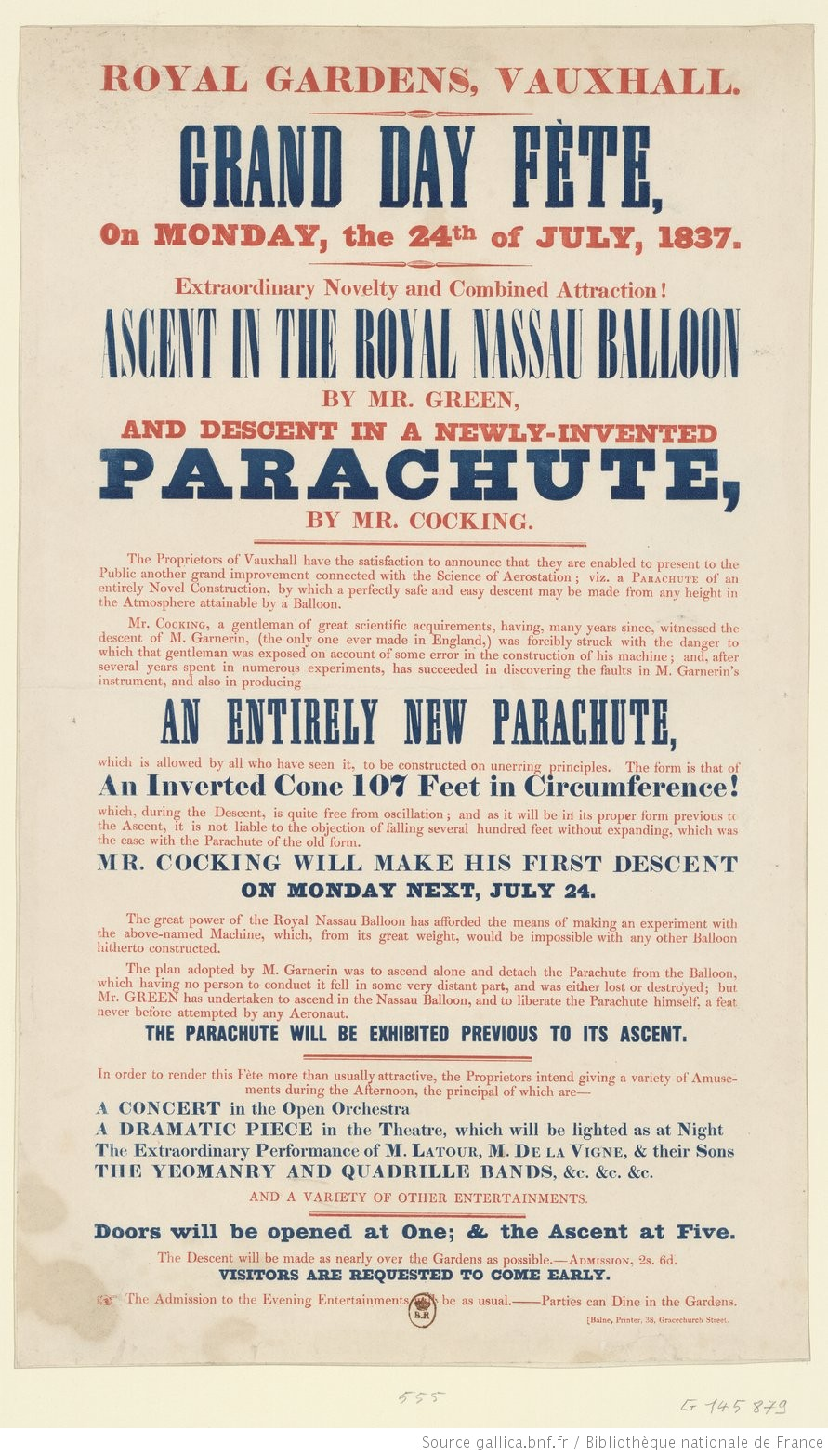
Royal Gardens, Vauxhall. Grand Day Fète, on Monday, the 24th of July, 1837.

Robert Cocking was a professional watercolour artist with a keen amateur interest in science. He had seen André-Jacques Garnerin make the first parachute jump in England in 1802 (the first modern parachute jump had been carried out in 1785 by Jean-Pierre Blanchard) and was inspired to develop an improved design after reading Sir George Cayley's paper On Aerial Navigation. Cayley's paper, published in 1809–1810, discussed Garnerin's jump at some length. Garnerin had used an umbrella-shaped parachute which had swayed excessively from side-to-side during the descent; Cayley theorised that a cone-shaped parachute would be more stable. Cocking spent many years developing his improved parachute, based on Cayley's design, which consisted of an inverted cone 107 feet (32.61 m) in circumference connected by three hoops. Cocking approached Charles Green and Edward Spencer, owners of the balloon Royal Nassau (formerly the Royal Vauxhall), to allow him an opportunity to test his invention. Despite the fact that Cocking was 61 years old, was not a professional scientist, and had no parachuting experience, the owners of the balloon agreed and advertised the event as the main attraction of a Grand Day Fete at Vauxhall Gardens.

On 24 July 1837, Cocking's parachute was gaily decorated by the Gardens' artist E. W. Cocks. At 7:35 pm, Cocking ascended hanging below the balloon, which was piloted by Green and Spencer. Cocking was in a basket which hung below the parachute which in turn hung below the basket of the balloon. Cocking had hoped to reach 8,000 feet (2,440 m), but the weight of the balloon coupled with that of the parachute and the three men slowed the ascent; at 5,000 feet (1,500 m) and with the balloon nearly over Greenwich, Green informed Cocking that he would be unable to rise any higher if the attempt was to be made in daylight. Faced with this information, Cocking released the parachute.

== Crash ==
A large crowd had gathered to witness the event, but it was immediately obvious that Cocking was in trouble. He had neglected to include the weight of the parachute itself in his calculations, and as a result, the descent was far too quick. Though rapid, the descent continued evenly for a few seconds, but then the entire apparatus turned inside out and plunged downwards with increasing speed. The parachute broke up before it hit the ground and at about 200 to 300 feet (60 to 90 m) off the ground the basket detached from the remains of the canopy. Cocking was killed instantly in the crash; his body was found in a field in Lee. The blame for the failure of the parachute was initially laid at Cayley's door, but tests later revealed that although Cayley had neglected to mention the additional weight of the parachute in his paper, the cause of the crash had been a combination of the parachute's weight and its flimsy construction, in particular the weak stitching connecting the fabric to the hoops. Cocking's parachute weighed 250 lb (113 kg), many times more than modern parachutes. However, tests carried out by John Wise, an American balloonist, showed that Cocking's design would have been successful if only it had been larger and better constructed. In comparing the designs of Garnerin's and Cocking's parachutes he found that the latter always descended in a much steadier and more even manner. The oscillation problem inherent in the Garnerin parachute was later solved by the introduction of a vent in the top of the canopy.

Following Cocking's death parachuting became unpopular, and was confined to carnival and circus acts until the late 19th century, when developments such as the harness and breakaway chutes made it safer.
