= Robert Hollond =

English balloonist and politician

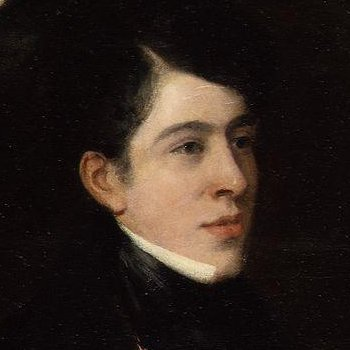
- from a painting by John Hollins
- Born: 5 January 1808; London, England
- Died: 1877 (aged 68–69); Paris, France
- Resting place: Great Stanmore
- Education: Corpus Christi
- Occupation: Politician
- Known for: Balloonist
- Spouse: Ellen Julia Hollond
- Parent(s): William and Harriet Hollond

Robert Hollond (1808–1877) was an English balloonist, lawyer, and politician. He funded and then took part in establishing a distance ballooning record with Thomas Monck Mason and Charles Green. He later served as a Whig politician representing the constituency of Hastings.

== Biography ==
Hollond was born in 1808 to William Hollond who was a wealthy civil servant in Bengal. Hollond studied law at Corpus Christi College in Cambridge and despite his enthusiasm for ballooning he had become a lawyer by 1834. Hollond channelled his ballooning interest into funding a record balloon attempt in 1836 by the experienced aeronaut, Charles Green. Charles Green, a professional balloonist and aeronaut planned the record attempt which set out from Vauxhall Gardens in London on 7 November 1836 at 1:30 p.m. Hollond, Green and Thomas Monck Mason travelled 500 miles in eighteen hours.

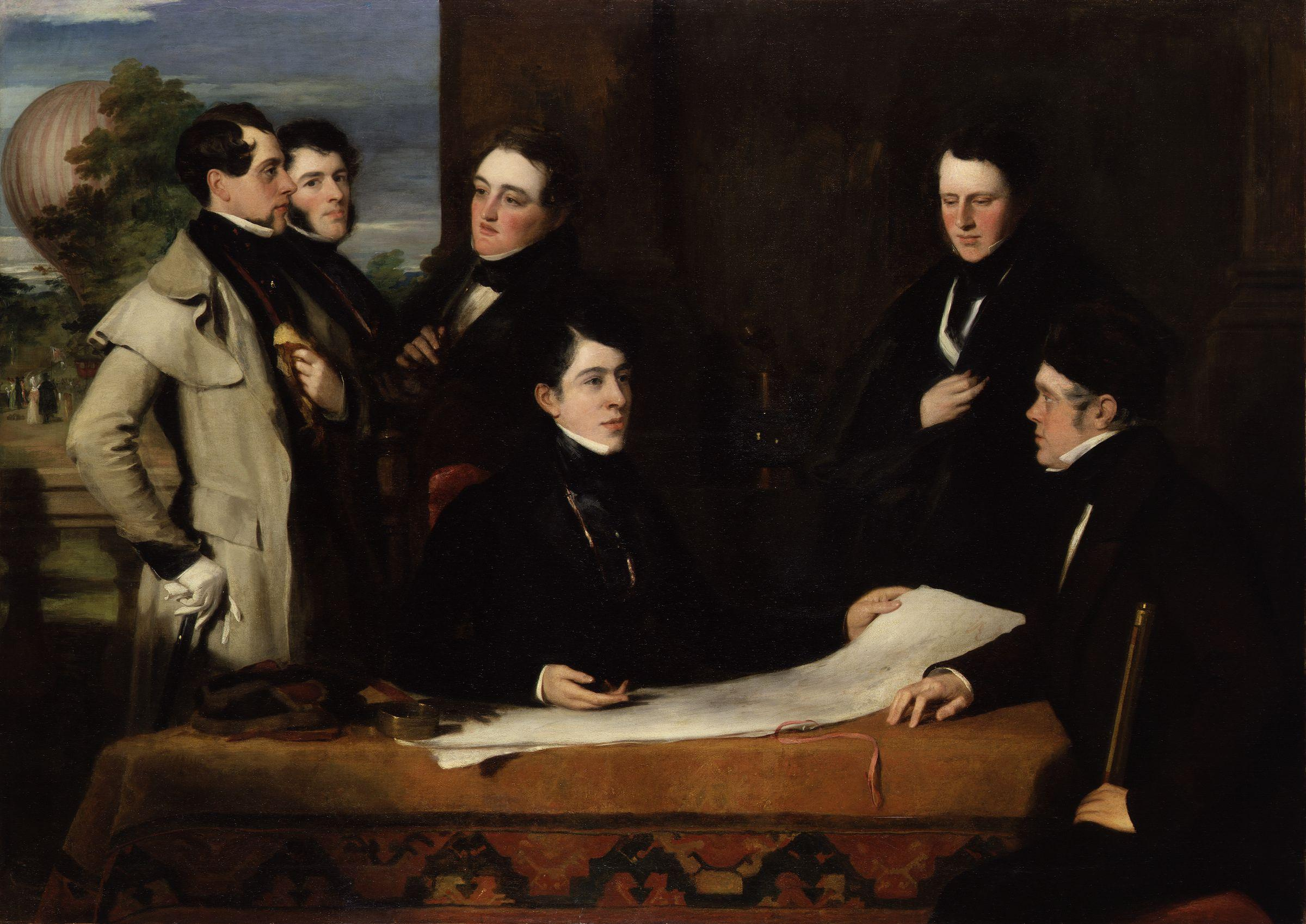
A Consultation prior to the Aerial Voyage to Weilburgh, 1836, a painting by John Hollins. The people can be identified using a cursor.

In 1836, Thomas Monck Mason wrote an Account of the Late æronautical Expedition from London to Weilburg which detailed the journey. This book was dedicated to Hollond.

The commemorative painting (illustration, left) that shows a consultation before the journey is by John Hollins who later became an Associate of the Royal Academy. The painting portrays, from left to right, Walter Prideaux a lawyer friend, John Hollins who painted the portraits, William Milbourne James (later Vice-Chancellor and Lord Justice of Appeal), Charles Green the balloonist, Thomas Monck Mason, the other passenger, and Hollond at the centre.

Besides the painting and the book, the humorous poet Thomas Hood also wrote a comic poem to celebrate the epic journey to Nassau. The Ode to Messrs Green, Hollond and Monck on their late Balloon Adventure, includes the following lines

Two legged high fliers
What upper stories you must have to tell
And nobody can contradict you well
Or call you liars

In 1837, Hollond served as a Whig politician representing the constituency of Hastings. According to official parliamentary records, Hollond served from 1837 until 1852, but he did not speak for nearly his first ten years in the House of Commons. Hollond bought Stanmore Hall in Middlesex in 1847. This house had previously belonged to his father-in-law, Thomas Teed, but had been resited in order that the views could be improved.

In 1840 Hollond married Ellen Julia Teed, an author and philanthropist. Ellen Hollond gave a François Boucher painting called "Pan and Syrinx" to the National Gallery. The liberals of the time attended her salon in Paris. Her portrait in the National Gallery, London, entitled "Mrs Robert Hollond", is by the French academic painter, Ary Scheffer. Ellen Julia Hollond was said to be the founder of London's first crèche.

Parliament of the United Kingdom
Preceded by Sir Howard Elphinstone Bt; Frederick North	Member of Parliament for Hastings; 1837–1852; With: Musgrave Brisco 1844–1852; Joseph Planta 1837–1844	Succeeded by Patrick Robertson; Musgrave Brisco
