= The Balloon-Hoax =

Edgar Allan Poe hoax

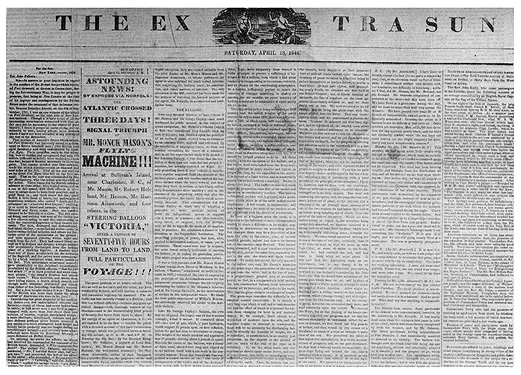
Saturday, April 13, 1844, issue of the New York Sun

"The Balloon-Hoax" is the title used in collections and anthologies of a newspaper article by American writer Edgar Allan Poe, first published in 1844 in The Sun newspaper in New York. Originally presented as a true story, it detailed European Monck Mason's trip across the Atlantic Ocean in only three days in a gas balloon. It was later revealed as a hoax and the story was retracted two days later.

== Overview ==
The story now known as "The Balloon-Hoax" was first printed in The Sun newspaper in New York. The article provided a detailed and highly plausible account of a lighter-than-air balloon trip by European balloonist Monck Mason across the Atlantic Ocean taking 75 hours, along with a diagram and specifications of the craft.

Poe may have been inspired, at least in part, by a prior journalistic hoax known as the "Great Moon Hoax", published in the same newspaper in 1835. One of the suspected writers of that hoax, Richard Adams Locke, was Poe's editor at the time "The Balloon-Hoax" was published. Poe had complained for a decade that the paper's Great Moon Hoax had plagiarized (by way of Locke) the basic idea from "The Unparalleled Adventure of One Hans Pfaall", one of Poe's less successful stories which also involved similar inhabitants on the Moon. Poe felt The Sun had made tremendous profits from his story without giving him a cent. (Poe's anger at The Sun is chronicled in the 2008 book The Sun and the Moon by Matthew Goodman.)

== Publication history ==
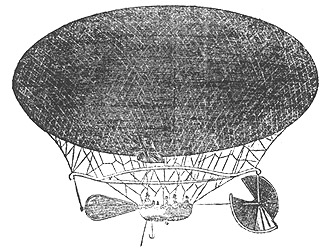
Illustration of The Victoria that accompanied the news article

The story was first published on April 13, 1844 in the New York Sun. It ran with the headline:

ASTOUNDING NEWS!
BY EXPRESS VIA NORFOLK:
THE ATLANTIC CROSSED
IN THREE DAYS!
SIGNAL TRIUMPH OF
MR. MONCK MASON'S
FLYING MACHINE!!!
Arrival at Sullivan's Island,
near Charlestown, S. C., of
Mr. Mason, Mr. Robert Hol-
land, Mr. Henson, Mr. Har-
rison Ainsworth, and four
others, in the
STEERING BALLOON
"VICTORIA,"
AFTER A PASSAGE OF
SEVENTY-FIVE HOURS
FROM LAND TO LAND.
FULL PARTICULARS
OF THE
VOYAGE!!!

A retraction concerning the article was printed in The Sun on April 15, 1844:

BALLOON – The mails from the South last Saturday night not having brought a confirmation of the arrival of the Balloon from England, the particulars of which from our correspondent we detailed in our Extra, we are inclined to believe that the intelligence is erroneous. The description of the Balloon and the voyage was written with a minuteness and scientific ability calculated to obtain credit everywhere, and was read with great pleasure and satisfaction. We by no means think such a project impossible.

== Critical reception and significance ==
Poe himself describes the enthusiasm his story had aroused: he writes that the Sun building was "besieged" by people wanting copies of the newspaper. "I never witnessed more intense excitement to get possession of a newspaper", he wrote. The story's impact reflects on the period's infatuation with progress. Poe added realistic elements, discussing at length the balloon's design and propulsion system in believable detail. His use of real people, including William Harrison Ainsworth, also lent credence to the story. The character of Monck Mason was not a real person, though he was based heavily on Thomas Monck Mason; the story borrowed heavily from Mason's 1836 book Account of the Late Aeronautical Expedition from London to Weilburg.

"The Balloon-Hoax" is like one of Poe's "tales of ratiocination" (such as "The Murders in the Rue Morgue") in reverse: rather than taking things apart to solve a problem, Poe builds up fiction to make it seem true. The story is also an early form of science fiction, specifically responding to the emerging technology of hot air balloons.

The story may have later been an inspiration for Jules Verne's Around the World in Eighty Days. As Verne scholar William Butcher pointed out, Verne was an early admirer of Poe and his novel Cinq semaines en ballon (Five Weeks in a Balloon) was published within a year of his non-fiction book Edgar Poe et ses œuvres (Edgar Allan Poe and his Works). Verne even has a character mention Poe's story in From the Earth to the Moon. It is not difficult to see Poe's works, published in France as Histoires extraordinaires ("Extraordinary Stories"), as one of the influences on Verne's Voyages extraordinaires ("Extraordinary Journeys").

== Real trans-oceanic lighter-than-air flights ==
The first human-carrying lighter-than-air craft of any type to cross the Atlantic was the British dirigible R-34 in 1919, a direct copy of the German L-33 which crashed in Britain during World War I. The 3559.5 mile flight from Britain to New York City took 108 hours 12 minutes.

The first human-carrying unpowered balloon to actually cross the Atlantic Ocean was Double Eagle II from August 11 to 17, 1978. The Pacific was crossed in three days by unmanned Japanese "fire balloons" called Fu-Go in 1944, exactly 100 years after Poe's story.
