= John Hollins (artist) =

British portraitist (1798–1855)

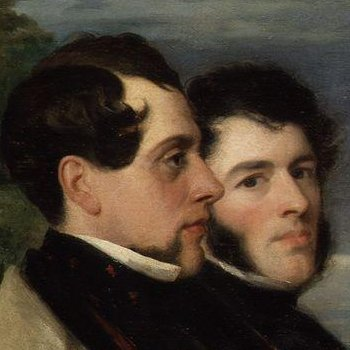
- Hollins (right) and Walter Prideaux
- Born: 1 June 1798; Birmingham, England
- Died: 7 March 1855 (aged 56); Marylebone, London, England
- Occupation: Artist
- Known for: Portraits in oil

John Hollins ARA (1 June 1798 – 7 March 1855) was a London-based portraitist. His works are in the National Portrait Gallery and elsewhere. Hollins' painting on the subject of planning a record breaking balloon trip includes the three balloonists Robert Hollond, Thomas Monck Mason and Charles Green and an image of Hollins himself.

== Biography ==
Hollins was born in Birmingham on 1 June 1798 to an artistic family. His father, Thomas, was a glass painter; his cousin was Peter Hollins a notable sculptor and his uncle William was an architect and sculptor.

Hollins moved to London for a few years in his mid twenties earning his living creating portraits in oils and the occasional miniature. In 1825 he became friends with the future Lord Wenlock, then Sir Robert Lawley. Hollins trained further in Italy and established a lifelong relationship with David Wilkie. Hollins did not return to his London business until 1827. His works were successfully entered for exhibitions at the British Institution and the Royal Academy of Art.

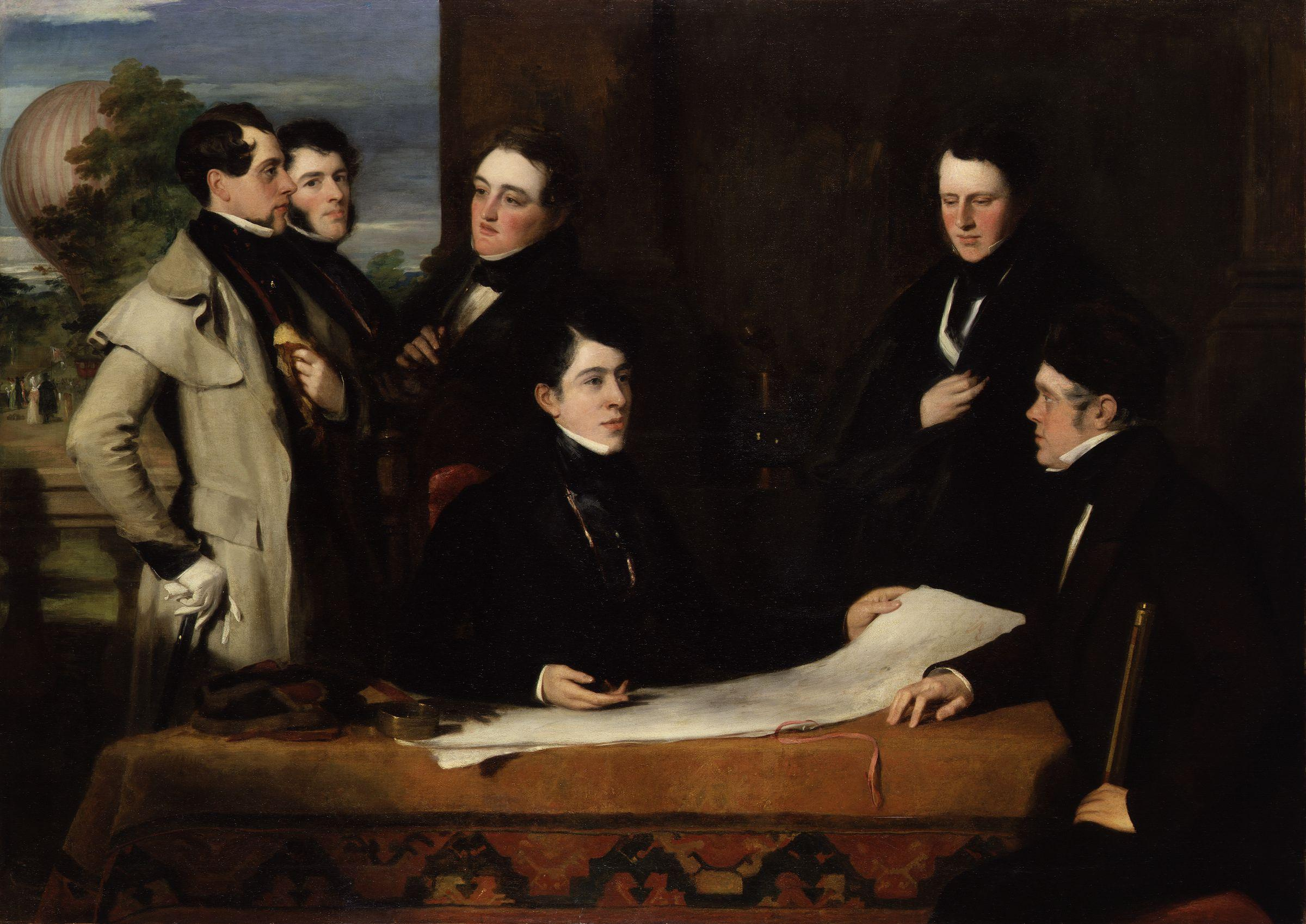
A Consultation prior to the Aerial Voyage to Weilburgh, 1836, a painting by John Hollins. The people can be identified using a cursor.

In 1834, Hollins made his last journey abroad on a confidential visit to Italy. He was involved in work resulting from the last wishes of Lord Wenlock.

Hollins was honoured in 1842 when the Royal Academy decided to unusually appoint two portrait artists as associates and Francis Grant and Hollins were appointed. As an associate he was able to commend premium prices. He did some models and landscapes but the portraits were his main occupation.

Hollins never married. Possibly the most remarkable painting also included his own self-portrait. The painting recorded a planning meeting before an attempt on the distance record for travelling in a balloon. The record established stood for over thirty years after Hollins' death. Charles Green, a professional balloonist and aeronaut planned the record attempt which set out from Vauxhall Gardens in London on 7 November 1836 at 1:30 p.m. The journey was paid for by Robert Hollond who served as the Whig member of parliament for Hastings.

The balloon made remarkable progress for the nineteenth century and crossed the channel the same day. The balloon returned to earth in Germany establishing a distance record that was to remain unbroken until the twentieth century (1905). In eighteen hours they travelled 500 miles to their landing at Weilburg. There are six people in the painting, three of them are those who made the journey, Hollond, Green and Monck Mason; the others were Walter Prideaux, William Milbourne James (who became an eminent judge) and Hollins himself.

Hollins died on 7 March 1855, at his residence in Berners Street, London, aged 56 years. He was buried at Kensal Green Cemetery. His monument is by his cousin, Peter Hollins.

== Selected works ==
- Portrait of Baron Tenterden
- A Consultation prior to the Aerial Voyage to Weilburgh, 1836
- Incendio de Borgo, after Raphael

There are few pictures by Hollins in public ownership in the UK.
