= Winifred Penn-Gaskell =

British philatelist

Winifred Ethel Penn-Gaskell (12 November 1874 – 6 November 1949) was a British philatelist who in 1938 was the first woman to be added to the Roll of Distinguished Philatelists. She was a specialist in aerophilately, and the philately of the Peru-Chile war. Penn-Gaskell was president of the Aero-Philatelic Club, London, and her collection of airmail and associated material was bequeathed to the Science Museum, South Kensington.
