= Rhiannon Prideaux =

Rhiannon Prideaux is Deputy CEO and volunteer coordinator at the Nottingham Arimathea Trust, which provides housing and support for people who have had their first claim for asylum refused.

== Early life and education ==
Prideaux received master's degree in international development from the University of Birmingham in 2012, and a first class bachelor's degree in English and French from the University of Leeds, where she studied from 2006 to 2010.

== Human rights work ==
Working with Nottingham's Arimathea Trust, Prideaux finds shelter and support for asylum seekers and refugees in her area, making sure they have legal representation as they fight to stay safe. She manages a team of volunteer ‘befrienders’, lawyers and mentors, organising petitions and running marathons in her spare time to raise further awareness. In 2018 she featured in Amnesty UK's Suffragette spirit map of Britain.
