= Devon and Cornwall Bank =

British bank (1832–1906)

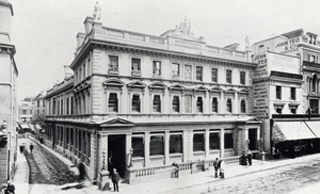
Head office of the Devon and Cornwall Bank in Plymouth, photographed in 1900

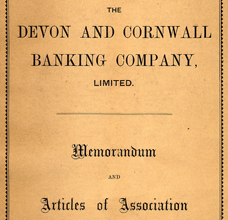
Front cover of the 1899 Memorandum and Articles of Association of the Devon & Cornwall Bank

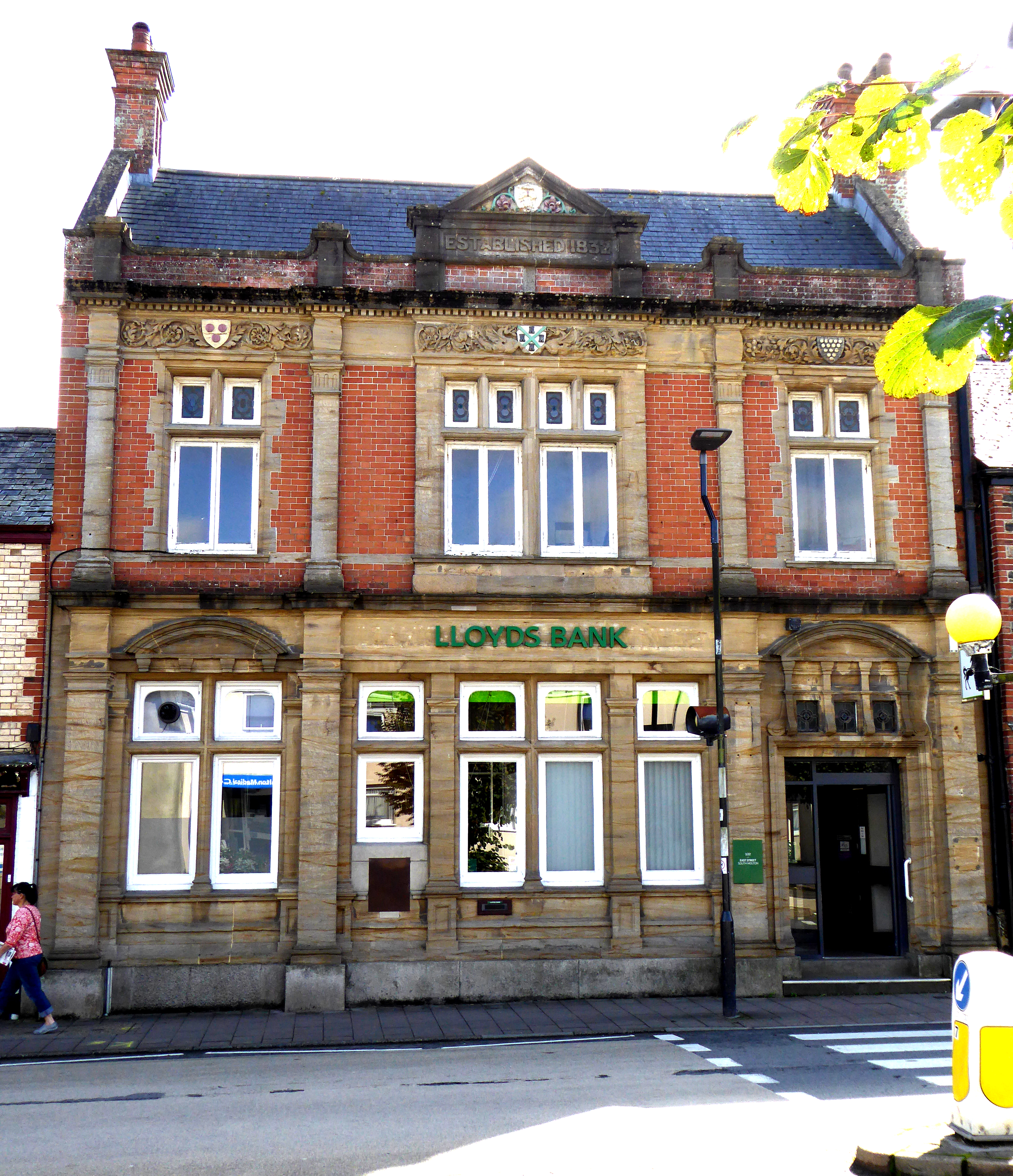
Devon and Cornwall Bank Building, South Molton, Devon, in 2017, continuing as a branch of Lloyd's Bank. Displaying on the frieze left to right: the arms of Courtenay, Earls of Devon; of the Corporation of Plymouth; of the Duchy of Cornwall; sculpted text above: "Established 1832" above which in the pediment are shown the arms of the Borough of South Molton. Behind the modern signage of "Lloyds Bank" is visible the vestige of the former signage "Devon & Cornwall Bank"

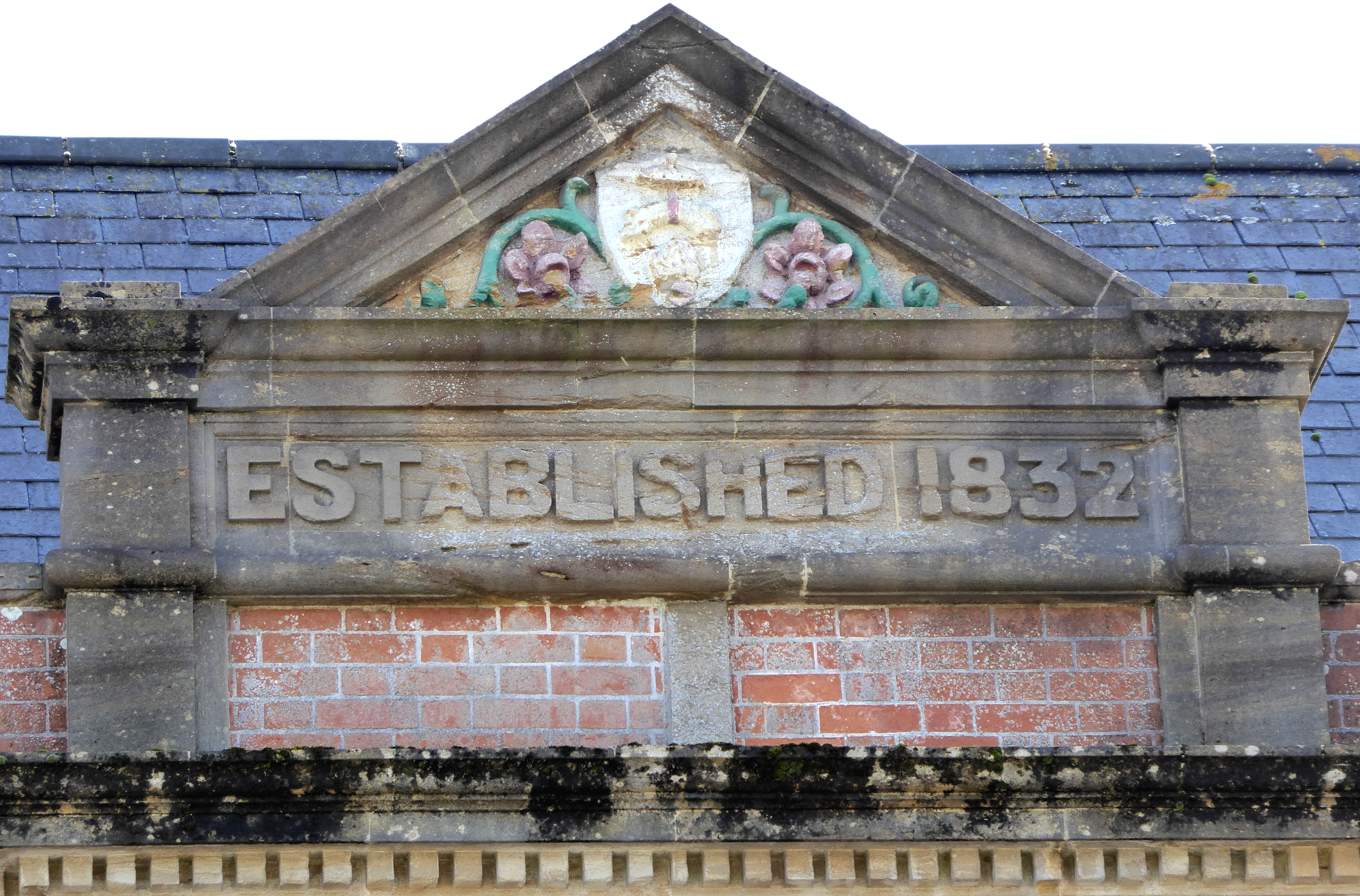
Detail of pediment of Devon and Cornwall Bank Building, South Molton, showing in the tympanum the arms of the Borough of South Molton, below which is sculpted on the architrave: "Established 1832"

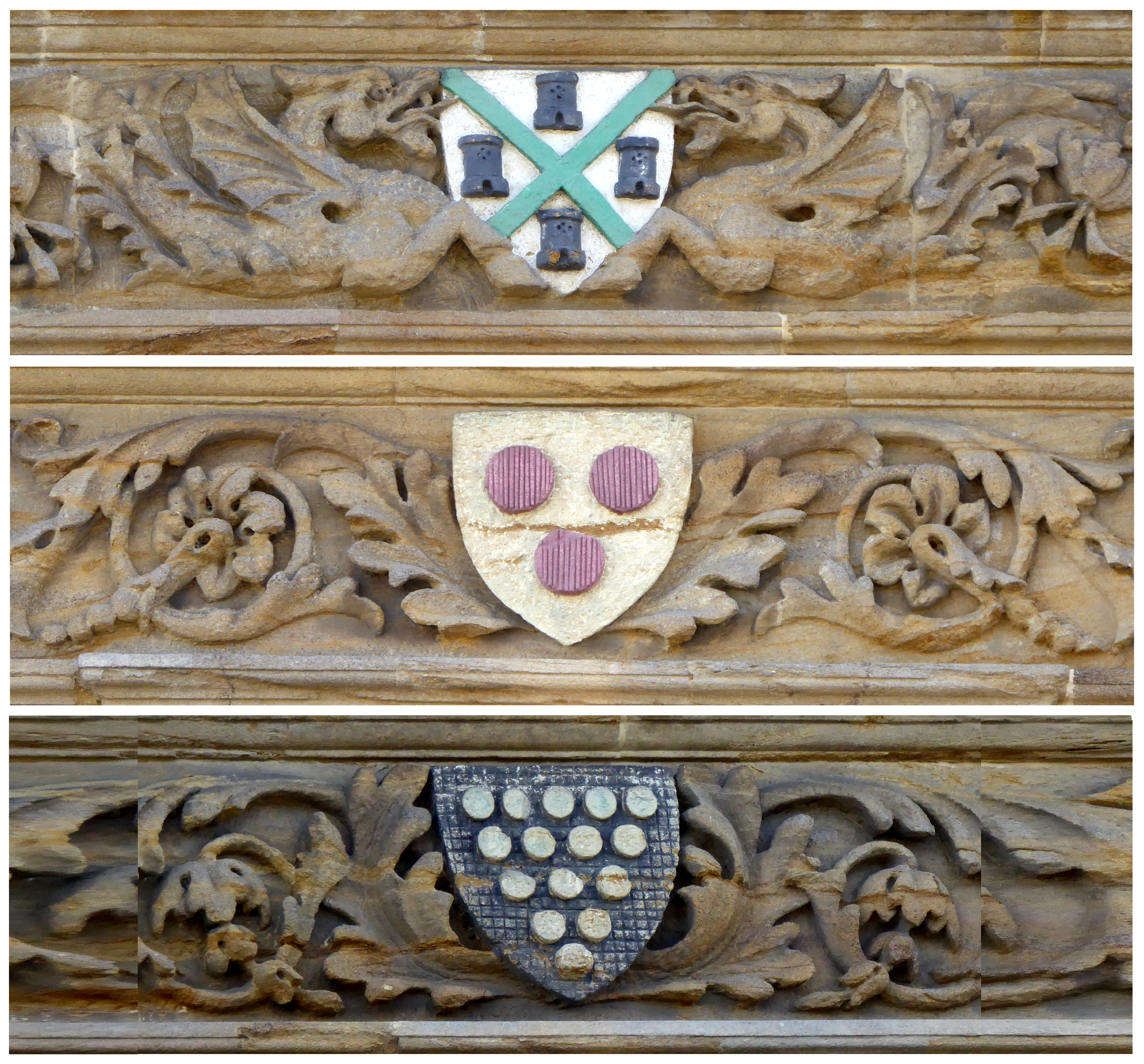
Detail of frieze of Devon and Cornwall Bank Building, South Molton, showing (top to bottom) arms of the Corporation of Plymouth; of Courtenay, Earls of Devon; of the Duchy of Cornwall

The Devon and Cornwall Bank (formally the Devon & Cornwall Banking Company) was a bank which operated in the Westcountry of England between 1832 and 1906, when it was taken-over by Lloyds Bank.

== History ==
The bank was established in 1832 as a joint-stock company named Plymouth & Devonport Banking Company by a group of Westcountry businessmen as a vehicle to effect the purchase of Hingston & Prideaux, a private Westcountry bank which had encountered financial difficulties.

=== Hingston & Prideaux ===
==== Founding ====
The Kingsbridge historian Abraham Hawkins wrote in 1819:

"A Bank was established at Kingsbridge in the month of February, 1806, by Messrs. Walter Prideaux, John Square, Joseph Hingston, and Walter Prideaux junior. It was first opened in a house on the West side of Fore street nearly opposite the late Buttermarket, and on the North side of Millman's Lane which communicates with the West backlet. An excellent stone mansion however, with an appropriate room for this concern, having been erected by the junior partner on the East side of Fore Street Hill, facing the houses a little above the Quakers' meeting, the business was removed thither in 1808; and, the second partner being dead, but replaced by his son of the same Christian name, and the third removed to Plymouth, where he carries on a similar establishment, the notes of the present firm bear the designation of "Prideaux, Square, and Prideaux," whose Loudon correspondents are messieurs Masterman, Peters, Mildred, & Co. No, 2. White-Hart Court, Gracechurch Street".

Thus two separate banks were in existence: one at Kingsbridge (Prideaux, Square, and Prideaux) and another at Plymouth (Hingston & Prideaux)

==== Development ====
On 31 October 1813 the banking partnership known as Prideaux, Square, Hingston and Prideaux of Kingsbridge in Devon (whose partners were Walter Prideaux (1741-1829) "Senior", John Square, Joseph Hingston and Walter Prideaux (1769-1855) "Junior" (son of Walter Prideaux (1741-1829) "Senior") was dissolved by mutual consent to allow for the retirement of Joseph Hingston (who as Hawkins relates above "removed to Plymouth, where he carries on a similar establishment"), and was immediately reformed as Prideaux, Square and Prideaux.

Joseph Hingston's new partner in the Plymouth bank was Walter Prideaux (d. 1832), a cousin of the Kingsbridge bankers, a son of George Prideaux of Kingsbridge by his wife Anna Debell Cookworthy, and a Quaker associated with the Plymouth Brethren, having moved from Kingsbridge to Plymouth in 1812. It is not clear what relation he was to the ancient gentry family of Prideaux seated variously at Orcheton, Modbury; Adeston, Holbeton; Thuborough, Sutcombe; Soldon, Holsworthy; Netherton, Farway; Ashburton; Nutwell, Woodbury; Ford Abbey, Thorncombe all in Devon, and at Prideaux Place, Padstow and Prideaux Castle, Luxulyan, in Cornwall. Fox (1874) stated in regard of the Kingsbridge branch of Prideaux: "We have no intention ... of tracing the pedigree back to old Paganus de Prideaux, who came over from Normandy with William the Conqueror, and who was Lord of the Castle of Prideaux, in Cornwall".

In 1798 Messrs. Walter Prideaux (i.e. Walter Prideaux (1769-1855) "Junior") and John Roope erected extensive machinery at the former Kingsbridge corn-mill, which they converted into a woollen manufactory, where for a number of years the serge or long-ell trade was carried on, to supply the East India Company with goods for India. One of the sons of Walter Prideaux (1769-1855) "Junior" (by his wife Sarah Were) was Walter Were Prideaux (1792-1878), one of the partners in the Kingsbridge Bank on its bankruptcy in 1825.

In 1805 Walter Prideaux (d.1832), the Plymouth banker, married Sarah-Ball Hingston, a daughter of his partner Joseph Hingston (1764-1835) (Senior), merchant, of Dodbrooke (adjacent to Kingsbridge) in Devon, by his first wife Sarah Ball (d. 1790), a daughter of Joseph Ball of Bridgwater in Somerset. Sarah's brother, also by their father's first wife, was Joseph Hingston (1788-1852) (Junior) of Dodbrooke. Walter Prideaux (d. 1832) had six sons and five daughters, including Walter Prideaux (1806–1889), a lawyer and poet, and the lawyer Frederick Prideaux (1817-1891), author of Prideaux's Precedents in Conveyancing, and his daughter Sarah Anna Prideaux was married to the Quaker Samuel Prideaux Tregelles (1813-1875), from Falmouth, the biblical scholar, textual critic, and theologian. (The second wife of Joseph Hingston (1764-1835) was Catherine-Phillips Tregelles, a daughter of Joseph Tregelles of Falmouth).

In 1825 the partners in Hingston & Prideaux Bank were Joseph Hingston and Walter Prideaux of Plymouth.

The Cookworthy Museum in Kingsbridge possesses a one pound banknote issued by the "Kingsbridge Bank", dated in writing 1 January 1825 and signed by Walter Prideaux jnr, with a crest on left. The back bears a red and black design with "G.R. IV" with central crest, five pence above and 'ONE' below.

==== Bankruptcy ====
Commissions of bankruptcy were appointed on 1 October 1825 and again on 6 October 1825, against the firm of John Square, Walter Prideaux (Junior) and Walter Were Prideaux, bankers of Kingsbridge. Dividends from the bankruptcy were paid to creditors at the King's Arms Inn at Kingsbridge on 31 March 1830.

=== Devon & Cornwall Banking Company ===
The name of the Hingston & Prideaux Bank, which although it encountered financial difficulties appears to have escaped the fate of its competitor at Kingsbridge, was later changed to Devon & Cornwall Banking Company to reflect its expanded geographical sphere of operations. The headquarters was in the City of Plymouth in Devon, and within one year of its establishment the first branch had been opened at St Austell in Cornwall. The bank's policy was to "seek opportunities in the centre of agricultural and mining districts and commercial metropolises being destitute of a regular bank". By 1840 the bank had 15 branches and by 1900 had 55 branches, when it had become one of the largest banks in the south-west. In 1906 the bank was taken over by Lloyds Bank, also of Quaker origins, in order to supply its deficiency of a branch network in the Westcountry.
