= Thomas Monck Mason =

British musician, writer and balloonist (1803–1889)

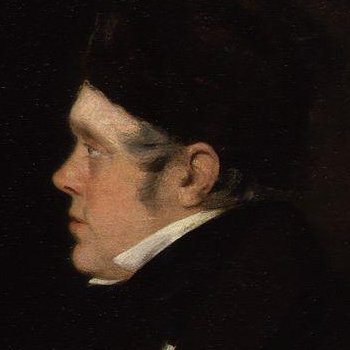
- Mason in a painting by John Hollins, 1836
- Born: 1803
- Died: 1889 (aged 85–86)
- Occupation: Musician
- Known for: Balloonist

Thomas Monck Mason (1803–1889) was a British flute player, writer, and balloonist. He wrote concerning a balloon trip he took from England to Germany and on theology. His account of the balloon trip inspired Edgar Allan Poe's fictional The Balloon-Hoax.

== Biography ==
Monck Mason was born in 1803. He spent some years studying the flute abroad after he completed his formal education at Trinity College in Dublin. He composed a number of operatic works as well as being a professional flautist.

Monck Mason is shown in a painting preparing for a journey in a balloon with Charles Green and Robert Hollond. They travelled a record distance of 500 miles in 18 hours.

In 1836, Thomas Monck Mason wrote an Account of the Late æronautical Expedition from London to Weilburg which detailed the journey. This book was dedicated to Hollond.

Mason republished the book in an extended form in 1838 when it was titles, Aeronautica; Or, Sketches Illustrative of the Theory and Practice of Aerostation: Comprising an Enlarged Account of the Late Aerial Expedition to Germany. The book contained illustrations of the balloon and its journey. The engravings were said to be based on sketches made by Mason.

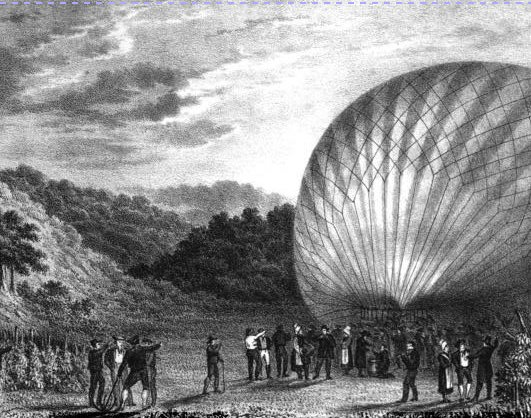
The balloon in the valley of Elbern after landing

Mason describes the journey which took only eighteen hours and how after landing they started to return to England. He notes that it took several hours to procure fourteen helpers and a horse and cart. These were required to get the balloon to the nearest town of Weilburg. Mason notes that the precise location where they landed was by a mil called Dillhausen in the valley of Elbern, two leagues from Weilburg. This is interesting as he says this is also the place where Jean-Pierre Blanchard landed in an earlier balloon trip when he set out from Frankfurt in 1785.

Besides the painting and the book, the humorous poet Thomas Hood also wrote a comic poem to celebrate the epic journey to Nassau. The Ode to Messrs Green, Hollond and Monck on their late Balloon Adventure, includes the following lines

Write, then, Messrs. Monck Mason, Hollond, Green!
And tell us all you have, or haven't seen!
('Twas kind, when the balloon went out of town,
To take Monck Mason up and set him down,

In the 1840s, Mason was impoverished having lost considerable funds after leasing the Opera House in Covent Garden. The court case over the losses was to drag on for 23 years.

== After the balloon trip ==
For over thirty years after 1845 Mason published books on theology. His first book argued for the infallibility of the bible. Mason's 1863 work The Work and the Word or The Dealings and Doctrines of God in relation to the State and Salvation of Man summarily Reviewed Reconciled and Recommended in accordance with the dictates of Human Reason was described as ingeniously contrived, but theoretically theological.

Mason died in 1889.

== In fiction ==
Mason's book on the balloon trip was the model for a famous hoax told by Edgar Allan Poe. He published accounts of a man called Monck Mason who had just crossed the Atlantic by balloon in three days. The character of Monck Mason was not a real person, though he was based heavily on Thomas Monck Mason; the story borrowed heavily from Mason's 1836 book Account of the Late Aeronautical Expedition from London to Weilburg.
