= Orcheton, Modbury =

Historic estate in Devon, England

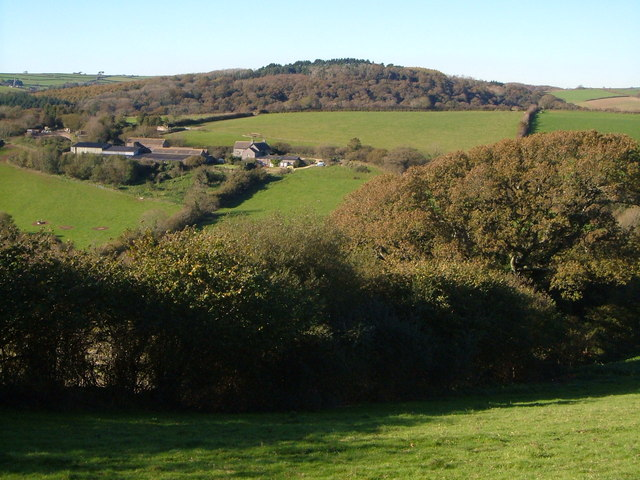
Great Orcheton Farm, viewed in 2006

Orcheton (anciently Orcharton, etc.) is an historic estate in the parish of Modbury in Devon. The present house, known as Great Orcheton Farm is situated 1 1/2 miles south-west of Modbury Church.

== Descent ==
=== de Vautort ===
The Domesday Book of 1086 lists ORCARTONE as the 65th of the 79 Devonshire holdings of Robert, Count of Mortain, uterine half-brother of King William the Conqueror. Robert's tenant was Reginald de Vautort (died post 1121), 1st feudal barony of Trematon in Cornwall, one of his major followers, who held from Robert numerous manors in Devon and Cornwall, including the manor of Modbury. Reginald de Vautort's principal seat was Trematon Castle in Cornwall, also held from Robert, Count of Mortain, which became the caput of the feudal barony of Trematon. Orcheton and Modbury thus descended as possessions of the Honour of Trematon.

=== de Orcharton ===
The de Orcharton family took its surname from its seat, as was usual. The last holder was John de Orcharton, whose daughter and heiress was Isabella de Orcharton (died 1249), first wife of Geoffry Pridyas, as younger son of Richard Predieux (died 1250) of Prideaux Castle, near Fowey, in Cornwall.

=== Prideaux ===
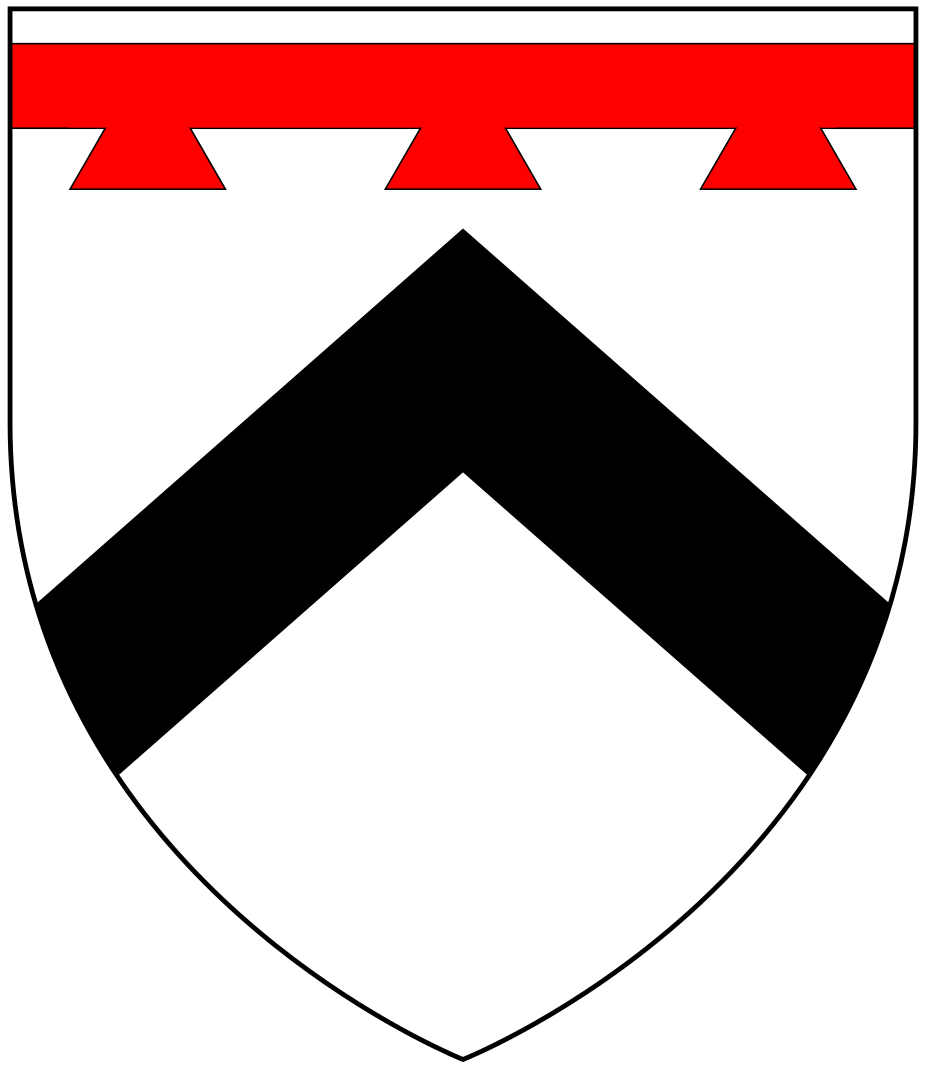
Arms of Prideaux: Argent, a chevron sable in chief a label of three points gules

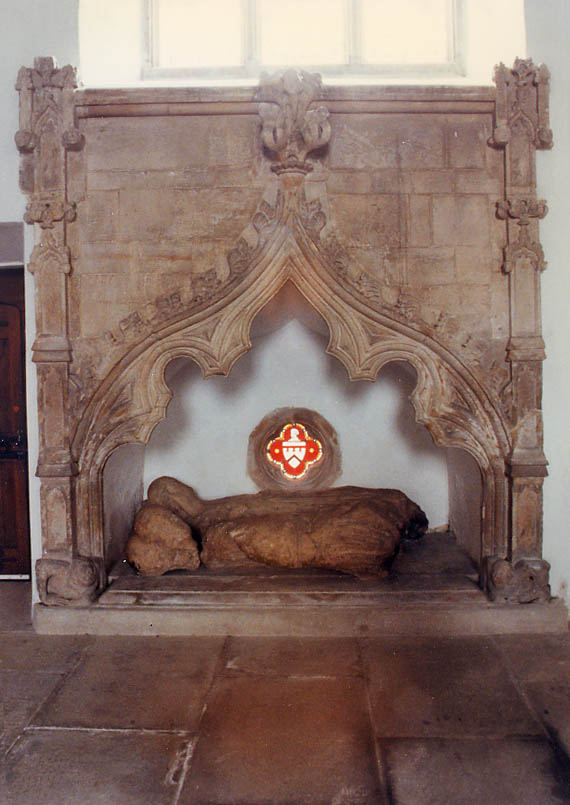
Mutilated effigy in Modbury Church believed to represent Sir John Prideaux (c. 1347 – 1403) of Orcheton, twice a Member of Parliament for Devon

The Book of Fees (c.1302, contents earlier) lists Geoffrey de Pridias as holding Orcherdton, as a member of the manor of Modbury, from the Honour of Trematon. The Prideaux family is believed to be of Norman origin and to have first settled in England at some time after the Norman Conquest of 1066 at Prideaux Castle, near Fowey, in Cornwall. It abandoned that seat and moved to Devon, where it spread out in various branches, earliest at Orcheton. Later branches were seated at Adeston, Holbeton; Thuborough, Sutcombe; Soldon, Holsworthy; Netherton, Farway (see Prideaux baronets); Ashburton; Nutwell, Woodbury and Ford Abbey, Thorncombe and at Prideaux Place in the parish of Padstow, Cornwall, where the Prideaux-Brune family still resides today. It was one of the most widespread and successful of all the gentry families of Devon, and as remarked upon by Swete (died 1821), exceptionally most of the expansion was performed by younger sons, who by the custom of primogeniture were expected to make their own fortunes.

The son and heir of Geoffry Pridyas by his first wife Isabella de Orcharton (died 1249) was Sir Roger Pridyas (living 1297), Sheriff of Devon in 1271, 1272 and 1273. His elder son and heir by his wife a certain Gilda, was Peter de Pridias (died 1316), who married a certain Clarice. His son and heir was Sir Roger de Pridias (d.pre-1357), a Member of Parliament for Devon in 1331, who married Elizabeth Treverbyn, daughter and co-heiress of Huge de Treverbyn of Treverbyn in the parish of St Austell in Cornwall. His second son was John Prideaux who founded the branch of the family seated at Adeston. His eldest son and heir was Roger de Pridias, who predeceased his father, having married twice. Firstly to a certain Elizabeth, by whom he had children, and secondly to Joan Clifford (daughter of Peter Clifford), who in 1357 claimed Orcheton as her dower as is recorded in the accounts of the Duchy of Cornwall, the overlord of the Honour of Trematon. Roger de Pridias's eldest son and heir was Sir John Prideaux (c. 1347 – 1403), twice a Member of Parliament for Devon in 1383 and 1388, whose much mutilated effigy survives in Modbury Church. He was granted the manor of Columb John by the Earl of Devon. As he died without male children his heir became his younger brother Sir Richard Prideaux (died 1408).

The descent in the Prideaux family continued for a further seven generations until Sir Robert Prideaux (1550-post 1603), knighted in July 1603, sold it to Sir John Hele (c. 1541 – 1608) of Wembury in Devon, a serjeant-at-law, Recorder of Exeter (1592–1605) and a Member of Parliament for Exeter who purchased the manors of Yealmpton and Wembury in Devon and whose effigy survives in Wembury Church.
