= Grade II* listed buildings in South Somerset =

South Somerset shown within the ceremonial county of Somerset

South Somerset is a former local government district in the English county of Somerset. The South Somerset district occupies an area of 370 square miles (958 km^{2}), stretching from its borders with Devon and Dorset to the edge of the Somerset Levels. The district had a population of about 158,000, and had Yeovil as its administrative centre.

In the United Kingdom, the term listed building refers to a building or other structure officially designated as being of special architectural, historical or cultural significance; Grade II* structures are those considered to be "particularly significant buildings of more than local interest". Listing was begun by a provision in the Town and Country Planning Act 1947. Once listed, severe restrictions are imposed on the modifications allowed to a building's structure or its fittings. In England, the authority for listing under the Planning (Listed Buildings and Conservation Areas) Act 1990 rests with Historic England, a non-departmental public body sponsored by the Department for Digital, Culture, Media and Sport; local authorities have a responsibility to regulate and enforce the planning regulations.

There are 266 Grade II* listed buildings in South Somerset.

== Buildings ==
Name	Location	Type	Completed (Note: The date given is the date used by Historic England as significant for the initial building or that of an important part in the structure's description.)	Grid ref. (Note: The grid reference is based on the British national grid reference system, sometimes known as OSGB36, used by the Ordnance Survey.) Geo-coordinates	Entry number (Note: The "List Entry Number" is a unique number assigned to each listed building and scheduled monument by Historic England.)	Image	Ref.
1–2 Castle Cottages	Chilthorne Domer	House	Early-mid 17th century	ST5241319269; 50°58′15″N 2°40′45″W	1057244	1–2 Castle Cottages	
Abbey House	South Cadbury	House	15th century	ST6237624867; 51°01′19″N 2°32′16″W	1258892	Upload Photo	.
Admiral Hood Monument	Compton Dundon	Monument	Early 19th century	ST4959233808; 51°06′05″N 2°43′17″W	1056743	Admiral Hood Monument More images	
Ansford Lodge	Ansford	House	Late 18th century	ST6415432918; 51°05′40″N 2°30′48″W	1307605	Ansford Lodge	
Ashford House	Ilton	House	Probably 17th century	ST3567118959; 50°57′59″N 2°55′03″W	1057048	Upload Photo	
Ashington Manor	Chilton Cantelo	House	15th century	ST5611521473; 50°59′27″N 2°37′36″W	1056833	Upload Photo	
Ashlar House	Martock	House	Early 18th century	ST4610419113; 50°58′08″N 2°46′08″W	1265440	Upload Photo	
Avishays	Chaffcombe	House	17th century	ST3521609255; 50°52′45″N 2°55′20″W	1366399	Avishays More images	
Balsam House	Wincanton	House	17th century	ST7168228520; 51°03′19″N 2°24′19″W	1238556	Balsam House	
Baptist Church	Chard	Schoolroom	Later 19th century	ST3218408499; 50°52′19″N 2°57′55″W	1206076	Baptist Church More images	
Bromes House	Isle Abbotts	Farmhouse	1627	ST3515620792; 50°58′58″N 2°55′30″W	1249589	Upload Photo	
Burton Pynsent House	Curry Rivel	House	Pre- c. 1756	ST3725724598; 51°01′02″N 2°53′45″W	1373913	Upload Photo	
Candle Cottage and garden walls and railing to East	Crewkerne	House	Late 15th century	ST4423009817; 50°53′06″N 2°47′39″W	1202997	Upload Photo	
Cathanger	Fivehead	House	1988	ST3423922881; 51°00′06″N 2°56′19″W	1263673	Upload Photo	
Chapel Cross	South Cadbury	House	13th century	ST6308226316; 51°02′06″N 2°31′40″W	1258890	Chapel Cross More images	
Chard Manor Farmhouse	Chard	Farmhouse	15th or early 16th century	ST3226208164; 50°52′08″N 2°57′50″W	1197429	Upload Photo	
Chard School	Chard	House	1583	ST3245208656; 50°52′24″N 2°57′41″W	1205594	Chard School More images	
Charlton House	Charlton Mackrell	House	Extended	ST5295029075; 51°03′33″N 2°40′22″W	1056766	Charlton House More images	
Church Cross in Churchyard of St James' Church	Preston Plucknett	Cross	Possibly 15th century	ST5347916220; 50°56′37″N 2°39′49″W	1173415	Upload Photo	
Church House with integral orangery	Yeovil	House	c. 1770	ST5561516020; 50°56′31″N 2°37′59″W	1055715	Upload Photo	
Church of All Saints	Castle Cary	Church	19th century	ST6391632055; 51°05′12″N 2°31′00″W	1056241	Church of All Saints More images	
Church of All Saints	Closworth	Church	13th century	ST5639310059; 50°53′18″N 2°37′17″W	1057233	Church of All Saints More images	
Church of All Saints	Kingsdon	Church	15th century	ST5157026203; 51°01′59″N 2°41′31″W	1223613	Church of All Saints More images	
Church of All Saints	Kingweston	Church	1852-1855	ST5251731324; 51°04′45″N 2°40′45″W	1307683	Church of All Saints More images	
Church of All Saints	Lopen	Church	12th century	ST4271414498; 50°55′37″N 2°48′59″W	1056994	Church of All Saints More images	
Church of All Saints	Merriott	Church	13th century	ST4427212844; 50°54′44″N 2°47′39″W	1175447	Church of All Saints More images	
Church of St Andrew	Aller	Church	11th century	ST3963228805; 51°03′19″N 2°51′46″W	1227327	Church of St Andrew More images	
Church of St Andrew	Ansford	Church	15th century	ST6382332909; 51°05′40″N 2°31′05″W	1307553	Church of St Andrew More images	
Church of St Andrew	Thorne Coffin	Church	1613	ST5260417604; 50°57′21″N 2°40′34″W	1263070	Church of St Andrew More images	
Church of St Andrew	Compton Dundon	Church	Early 14th century	ST4794232532; 51°05′23″N 2°44′41″W	1176782	Church of St Andrew More images	
Church of St Andrew	Dowlish Wake	Church	14th century	ST3756612944; 50°54′37″N 2°53′19″W	1366405	Church of St Andrew More images	
Church of St Andrew	Northover, Ilchester	Church	14th century	ST5234823141; 51°00′20″N 2°40′50″W	1267315	Church of St Andrew More images	
Church of St Andrew	Puckington	Church	13th century	ST3770118288; 50°57′38″N 2°53′18″W	1057727	Church of St Andrew More images	
Church of St Bartholomew	Yeovilton	Church	c. 1300	ST5468023013; 51°00′17″N 2°38′50″W	1056787	Church of St Bartholomew More images	
Church of St Catherine	Montacute	Church	19th century	ST4967316952; 50°56′59″N 2°43′04″W	1253547	Church of St Catherine More images	
Church of St David	Barton St David	Church	12th century	ST5397231699; 51°04′58″N 2°39′31″W	1176035	Church of St David More images	
Church of St James	East Lambrook, Kingsbury Episcopi	Church	19th century	ST4317218665; 50°57′53″N 2°48′38″W	1056883	Church of St James More images	
Church of St James	Chilton Cantelo	Church	15th century	ST5702522179; 50°59′51″N 2°36′50″W	1056835	Church of St James More images	
Church of St James	Preston Plucknett	Church	1420	ST5347516235; 50°56′37″N 2°39′49″W	1346135	Church of St James More images	
Church of St John the Baptist	South Brewham	Church	13th century	ST7196436143; 51°07′26″N 2°24′07″W	1056463	Church of St John the Baptist More images	
Church of St John the Baptist	Pitney	Church	13th century	ST4446328502; 51°03′11″N 2°47′37″W	1056546	Church of St John the Baptist More images	
Church of St John the Baptist	Horsington	Church	15th century	ST7029723861; 51°00′48″N 2°25′29″W	1238063	Church of St John the Baptist More images	
Church of St John the Baptist	North Cheriton	Church	14th-century	ST6872625826; 51°01′51″N 2°26′50″W	1274277	Church of St John the Baptist More images	
Church of St John the Evangelist and All Saints	Kingstone	Church	Post 1540	ST3788213637; 50°55′08″N 2°53′06″W	1057025	Church of St John the Evangelist and All Saints More images	
Church of St Lawrence	Cucklington	Church	13th century	ST7552227775; 51°02′56″N 2°21′02″W	1274765	Church of St Lawrence More images	
Church of St Margaret	Middle Chinnock	Church	12th century	ST4721213129; 50°54′55″N 2°45′08″W	1057169	Church of St Margaret More images	
Church of St Martin of Tours	West Coker	Church	13th or 14th century	ST5164913573; 50°55′10″N 2°41′21″W	1345829	Church of St Martin of Tours More images	
Church of St Mary	Buckland St Mary	Church	1853-1863	ST2708313408; 50°54′56″N 3°02′19″W	1277983	Church of St Mary More images	
Church of St Mary	Abbas and Templecombe	Church	12th century	ST7085922669; 51°00′10″N 2°25′00″W	1366329	Church of St Mary More images	
Church of St Mary	Charlton Mackrell	Church	13th century	ST5282728336; 51°03′09″N 2°40′28″W	1056728	Church of St Mary More images	
Church of St Mary	Chilthorne Domer	Church	13th century	ST5248219423; 50°58′20″N 2°40′41″W	1345756	Church of St Mary More images	
Church of St Mary	Compton Pauncefoot	Church	Pre 1262	ST6440226161; 51°02′01″N 2°30′33″W	1248577	Church of St Mary More images	
Church of St Mary	Donyatt	Church	15th century	ST3391614057; 50°55′20″N 2°56′30″W	1057074	Church of St Mary More images	
Church of St Mary	Seavington St Mary	Church	13th century	ST4028814920; 50°55′50″N 2°51′04″W	1307339	Church of St Mary More images	
Church of St Mary	Wambrook	Church	Pre 1613	ST2939407707; 50°51′52″N 3°00′17″W	1249439	Church of St Mary More images	
Church of St Mary	Yarlington	Church	11th century	ST6546829309; 51°03′43″N 2°29′39″W	1056212	Church of St Mary More images	
Church of St Mary	Hardington Mandeville	Church	Pre 1123	ST5123211932; 50°54′17″N 2°41′42″W	1345795	Church of St Mary More images	
Church of St Mary Magdalen	Cricket Malherbie, Knowle St Giles	Church	1855	ST3612911540; 50°53′59″N 2°54′35″W	1177461	Church of St Mary Magdalen More images	
Church of St Mary Magdalene	Sparkford	Church	14th century	ST6090725663; 51°01′44″N 2°33′32″W	1243352	Church of St Mary Magdalene More images	
Church of St Mary Major	Ilchester	Church	13th century	ST5225522613; 51°00′03″N 2°40′54″W	1345741	Church of St Mary Major More images	
Church of St Mary the Virgin	Stocklinch	Church	12th century	ST3866917084; 50°57′00″N 2°52′28″W	1175580	Church of St Mary the Virgin More images	
Church of St Mary the Virgin	Whitelackington	Church	Early 14th century	ST3795615268; 50°56′01″N 2°53′03″W	1057033	Church of St Mary the Virgin More images	
Church of St Mary Magdalene	Barwick	Church	13th century	ST5580413856; 50°55′21″N 2°37′49″W	1057217	Church of St Mary Magdalene More images	
Church of St Michael	Blackford	Church	11th or 12th century	ST6579826160; 51°02′02″N 2°29′21″W	1056557	Church of St Michael More images	
Church of St Michael	East Coker	Church	Late 12th century	ST5388312190; 50°54′26″N 2°39′26″W	1345781	Church of St Michael More images	
Church of St Michael	Cudworth	Church	12th century	ST3731310870; 50°53′38″N 2°53′34″W	1366403	Church of St Michael More images	
Church of St Michael	Seavington St Michael	Church	12th century	ST4101314947; 50°55′51″N 2°50′27″W	1057002	Church of St Michael More images	
Church of St Michael	Wayford	Church	13th century	ST4048006655; 50°51′23″N 2°50′49″W	1056166	Church of St Michael More images	
Church of St Michael and All Angels	Chaffcombe	Church	1857-60	ST3539410183; 50°53′15″N 2°55′11″W	1056177	Church of St Michael and All Angels More images	
Church of St Michael and All Angels	Haselbury Plucknett	Church	14th century	ST4713610930; 50°53′44″N 2°45′11″W	1056149	Church of St Michael and All Angels More images	
Church of St Michael and All Angels	Penselwood	Church	Mostly 15th century	ST7562331434; 51°04′54″N 2°20′58″W	1238353	Church of St Michael and All Angels More images	
Church of St Nicholas	Bratton Seymour	Church	Saxon	ST6771130078; 51°04′09″N 2°27′44″W	1177220	Church of St Nicholas More images	
Church of St Nicholas	Dinnington	Church	1863	ST4030212766; 50°54′41″N 2°51′02″W	1345887	Church of St Nicholas More images	
Church of St Nicholas	Henstridge	Church	12th century	ST7227919763; 50°58′36″N 2°23′46″W	1366325	Church of St Nicholas More images	
Church of St Nicholas	Holton	Church	14th century	ST6852826849; 51°02′24″N 2°27′01″W	1056348	Church of St Nicholas More images	
Church of St Peter	Redlynch	Church	c. 1750	ST6999433319; 51°05′54″N 2°25′48″W	1176298	Church of St Peter More images	
Church of St Peter	Ilton	Church	12th century	ST3518917423; 50°57′09″N 2°55′27″W	1057052	Church of St Peter More images	
Church of St Peter	South Barrow	Church	14th century	ST6018127892; 51°02′56″N 2°34′10″W	1258889	Church of St Peter More images	
Church of St Peter and St Paul	Charlton Horethorne	Church	12th century	ST6652423075; 51°00′22″N 2°28′43″W	1056366	Church of St Peter and St Paul More images	
Church of St Peter and St Paul	Chiselborough	Church	17th century	ST4674914873; 50°55′51″N 2°45′33″W	1345758	Church of St Peter and St Paul More images	
Church of St Peter and St Paul	Odcombe	Church	13th century	ST5069015466; 50°56′11″N 2°42′11″W	1241492	Church of St Peter and St Paul More images	
Church of St Peter and St Paul	Wincanton	Church	1793	ST7110728484; 51°03′18″N 2°24′49″W	1238534	Church of St Peter and St Paul More images	
Church of St Roch	Pendomer, Closworth	Church	14th century	ST5213410394; 50°53′28″N 2°40′55″W	1307971	Church of St Roch More images	
Church of St Stephen	Winsham	Church	13th century	ST3746306273; 50°51′09″N 2°53′23″W	1177765	Church of St Stephen More images	
Church of St Stephen	Charlton Musgrove	Church	13th century	ST7201329909; 51°04′04″N 2°24′03″W	1346185	Church of St Stephen More images	
Church of St Thomas	Cricket St Thomas	Church	1868	ST3728908584; 50°52′24″N 2°53′33″W	1056183	Church of St Thomas More images	
Church of St Thomas à Becket	South Cadbury	Church	13th century	ST6314125497; 51°01′40″N 2°31′37″W	1258922	Church of St Thomas à Becket More images	
Church of St Thomas of Canterbury	Lovington	Church	13th century	ST5966330835; 51°04′31″N 2°34′38″W	1056528	Church of St Thomas of Canterbury More images	
Church of the Blessed Virgin Mary	Ashill	Church	12th century	ST3211617263; 50°57′03″N 2°58′04″W	1057100	Church of the Blessed Virgin Mary More images	
Church of the Holy Cross	Babcary	Church	14th century	ST5614828774; 51°03′24″N 2°37′37″W	1277940	Church of the Holy Cross More images	
Church of the Holy Cross	Weston Bampfylde, Sparkford	Church	13th century	ST6105724942; 51°01′21″N 2°33′24″W	1243568	Church of the Holy Cross More images	
Churchyard Cross in Churchyard of the Church of St Catherine	Drayton	Cross	15th century	ST4051824760; 51°01′09″N 2°50′58″W	1236539	Churchyard Cross in Churchyard of the Church of St Catherine More images	
Churchyard Cross, 10m west of the Church of All Saints	Closworth	Cross	15th century	ST5476911124; 50°53′52″N 2°38′40″W	1307974	Churchyard Cross, 10m west of the Church of All Saints More images	
Churchyard Cross, about 5m south of Nave, Church of St Aldhelm and St Eadburgha	Broadway	Cross	Late 13th century-Early 14th century	ST3296315896; 50°56′19″N 2°57′20″W	1057005	Upload Photo	
Clapton Farmhouse	Cucklington	Farmhouse	1615	ST7513929201; 51°03′42″N 2°21′22″W	1222398	Upload Photo	
Clapton Mill (Lockyer and Son), with aqueduct to north east	West Crewkerne	Mill	Rebuilt 1864	ST4137106378; 50°51′14″N 2°50′03″W	1056856	Clapton Mill (Lockyer and Son), with aqueduct to north east More images	
Collins Chest Tomb, 2m south of the south east Nave window, Church of All Saints	Closworth	Chest tomb	1609	ST5638110049; 50°53′18″N 2°37′17″W	1345791	Collins Chest Tomb, 2m south of the south east Nave window, Church of All Saints	
Congregational Chapel, now United Reformed Church	Kingsbury Episcopi	Chapel	1729	ST4225518447; 50°57′45″N 2°49′25″W	1236948	Congregational Chapel, now United Reformed Church	
Coombe Hill House	Bruton	House	1820-1830	ST6837735529; 51°07′05″N 2°27′11″W	1346172	Upload Photo	
Cosenes Monument in Churchyard 5 metres south south east of South Transept, Church of All Saints	Castle Cary	Chest tomb	16th century	ST6393632046; 51°05′12″N 2°30′59″W	1366395	Upload Photo	
Court Farm House	Barwick	Farmhouse	Early 17th century	ST5639713545; 50°55′11″N 2°37′18″W	1057226	Upload Photo	
Court House	Martock	House	Late 16th century	ST4611219091; 50°58′07″N 2°46′08″W	1227536	Court House More images	
Court House	South Petherton	House	18th century	ST4321217051; 50°57′00″N 2°48′35″W	1056954	Upload Photo	
Craigmore House	Somerton	House	17th-18th century	ST4912128616; 51°03′17″N 2°43′38″W	1307586	Upload Photo	
Crane Farmhouse	Somerton	Farmhouse	Medieval	ST4903728337; 51°03′08″N 2°43′42″W	1346065	Upload Photo	
Cricket Court, and attached balustraded walling around basement areas	Cricket Malherbie	House	1811	ST3601111414; 50°53′55″N 2°54′41″W	1056158	Upload Photo	
Danyell Monument in churchyard about 0.5 metres south of Chancel, Church of St Thomas of Canterbury	Lovington	Chest tomb	Early 17th century	ST5967630830; 51°04′31″N 2°34′37″W	1277744	Upload Photo	
Darvole Farm House	East Coker	Farmhouse	16th century	ST5562212418; 50°54′34″N 2°37′57″W	1176487	Upload Photo	
Dental Surgery / Priors House	Wincanton	House	15th century	ST7124228567; 51°03′21″N 2°24′42″W	1238517	Upload Photo	
Dillington House	Whitelackington	House	16th century	ST3676515552; 50°56′09″N 2°54′05″W	1057040	Dillington House More images	
Donisthorpe	Somerton	House	Earlier	ST4909528681; 51°03′19″N 2°43′40″W	1056687	Upload Photo	
Dovecote about 370 metres south of Bruton Church	Bruton	Dovecote	16th century	ST6838534419; 51°06′29″N 2°27′11″W	1056424	Dovecote about 370 metres south of Bruton Church More images	
Dovecote in Churchyard, about 15m south west of church, Church of St Mary The Virgin	Norton Sub Hamdon	Dovecote	17th century	ST4703515946; 50°56′26″N 2°45′19″W	1241076	Dovecote in Churchyard, about 15m south west of church, Church of St Mary The Virgin More images	
Dowlish Manor Farmhouse	Dowlish Wake	House	11th century	ST3760812953; 50°54′46″N 2°53′20″W	1366406	Upload Photo	
East Lambrook Manor and forecourt wall / Manor Cottage	Kingsbury Episcopi	House	15th century	ST4316918898; 50°58′00″N 2°48′38″W	1264346	East Lambrook Manor and forecourt wall / Manor Cottage More images	
Easton House and forecourt wall	Barrington	House	c. 1600	ST3939918060; 50°57′32″N 2°51′51″W	1236314	Upload Photo	
Essex House	Chard	House	Mid 18th century	ST3238908636; 50°52′24″N 2°57′44″W	1297112	Upload Photo	
Factory Building, formerly of Gifford Fox and Company Limited	Chard	Factory	1820-1830	ST3223808450; 50°52′18″N 2°57′52″W	1197481	Upload Photo	
Former Priests House	Wayford	House	15th century	ST4048106625; 50°51′22″N 2°50′49″W	1056167	Upload Photo	
Front boundary wall, piers and gate, 15 metres north of Manor Farm House	Charlton Horethorne	Farmhouse	18th century	ST6650723168; 51°00′25″N 2°28′43″W	1174379	Front boundary wall, piers and gate, 15 metres north of Manor Farm House	
Gants Mill	Pitcombe	Mill	1810-c. 1830	ST6744434262; 51°06′24″N 2°27′59″W	1251831	Gants Mill More images	
Gatehouse to Cathanger	Fivehead	Gatehouse	Late 16th century	ST3417522850; 51°00′05″N 2°56′22″W	1249561	Upload Photo	
Gate-piers and boundary walling to the Manor House and Mallet Court, bounding gardens	Curry Mallet	House	16th century	ST3287421893; 50°59′33″N 2°57′28″W	1248996	Upload Photo	
Gazebo, Steps, Terraces and Walls to North West of Merefield House	Crewkerne	Wall	Early 18th century	ST4425109860; 50°53′08″N 2°47′38″W	1208228	Upload Photo	
George Hotel	Ilminster	Hotel	Mid 17th century	ST3610014567; 50°55′37″N 2°54′38″W	1298349	George Hotel More images	
Godminster Manor	Pitcombe	House	15th century	ST6837433007; 51°05′44″N 2°27′11″W	1251806	Upload Photo	
Group of eight Monuments in Churchyard, South and West of Nave, Church of St Andrew	Brympton d'Evercy	Tombs	17th century	ST5191215372; 50°56′09″N 2°41′09″W	1263241	Group of eight Monuments in Churchyard, South and West of Nave, Church of St Andrew More images	
Hadspen House	Pitcombe	House	18th century	ST6603631044; 51°04′40″N 2°29′10″W	1251809	Upload Photo	
Haselbury Old Bridge	Haselbury Plucknett	Bridge	14th century	ST4584710969; 50°53′44″N 2°46′17″W	1056146	Upload Photo	
Heale House	Curry Rivel	House	17th century	ST3915225268; 51°01′25″N 2°52′08″W	1249228	Upload Photo	
Hendford Manor	Yeovil	House	C. 1720	ST5543215722; 50°56′21″N 2°38′08″W	1296434	Hendford Manor	
Henley Manor Farmhouse	West Crewkerne	Farmhouse	Early 17th century	ST4394407683; 50°51′57″N 2°47′53″W	1175987	Upload Photo	
Hey Farmhouse	Winsham	Farmhouse	c. 1500	ST3879506459; 50°51′16″N 2°52′15″W	1307250	Hendford Manor	
High Leaze Farmhouse	Brympton	Farmhouse	17th century	ST5186516036; 50°56′30″N 2°41′11″W	1345772	More images	
Higher Farmhouse	Dowlish Wake	Farmhouse	Late 16th century	ST3756612641; 50°54′35″N 2°53′22″W	1240334	Upload Photo	
Hinton House (South Range)	Hinton St George	House	Medieval	ST4181412367; 50°54′28″N 2°49′44″W	1175284	Hinton House (South Range) More images	
Home Farmhouse and Farm Buildings attached to North East corner of Brympton House	Brympton	Farmhouse	18th century	ST5200815461; 50°56′12″N 2°41′04″W	1057267	Upload Photo	
Homefield	Norton Sub Hamdon	House	16th century	ST4719015933; 50°56′25″N 2°45′11″W	1241341	Upload Photo	
Honeywick	Pitcombe	Farmhouse	18th century	ST6531332489; 51°05′26″N 2°29′48″W	1262425	Upload Photo	
Hurds Mill House and Courtyard Walling	Curry Rivel	House	Late 18th century	ST4122826489; 51°02′05″N 2°50′22″W	1249226	Upload Photo	
Key Farm House	East Coker	Farmhouse	c. 1600	ST5563813418; 50°55′07″N 2°37′57″W	1057188	Upload Photo	
Kincora and attached railings	Crewkerne	House	17th century	ST4406409752; 50°53′04″N 2°47′48″W	1281924	Upload Photo	
Kingstone Farmhouse	Kingstone	Farmhouse	Early 16th century	ST3781513669; 50°55′09″N 2°53′10″W	1056988	Upload Photo	
Lancin Farmhouse	Wambrook	Farmhouse	Late medieval	ST2846407980; 50°52′01″N 3°01′05″W	1277516	Upload Photo	
Langford Fivehead	Fivehead	House	1905	ST4316918898; 50°58′00″N 2°48′38″W	1263649	Upload Photo	
Leigh House	Winsham	House	15th century	ST3558506210; 50°51′06″N 2°54′59″W	1056141	Upload Photo	
Lockyer's Farmhouse	Compton Dundon	Farmhouse	Medieval	ST4789432301; 51°05′16″N 2°44′43″W	1307775	Upload Photo	
Long Load Bridge	Long Load	Bridge	Medieval	ST4670223792; 51°00′40″N 2°45′40″W	1267215	Long Load Bridge More images	
Lower Cockhill Farmhouse, with Mounting Block 5 metres West	Castle Cary	Farmhouse	Late 15th century/early 16th century	ST6252431180; 51°04′43″N 2°32′11″W	1177369	Upload Photo	
Lullingstone	Winsham	House	16th century	ST3751106405; 50°51′14″N 2°53′21″W	1056176	Upload Photo	
Madey Mill	Martock	Watermill	Medieval	ST4674719058; 50°58′06″N 2°45′35″W	1226550	Madey Mill	
Main Building of the former Parrett Iron Works	Martock	Foundry	Maybe 18th century	ST4459818633; 50°57′52″N 2°47′25″W	1225080	Main Building of the former Parrett Iron Works More images	
Manning Chest Tomb, in Churchyard 4 metres South of South East Corner Church of St John the Baptist	Brewham	Chest Tomb	1618	ST7198236142; 51°07′26″N 2°24′06″W	1056464	Upload Photo	
Mannings	Stocklinch	Farmhouse	15th century	ST3825917236; 50°57′04″N 2°52′49″W	1308307	Upload Photo	
Manor Farm House	Charlton Horethorne	House	1608	ST6652223145; 51°00′24″N 2°28′43″W	1056363	Manor Farm House	
Manor Farm House	Mudford	House	1630	ST5774718897; 50°58′05″N 2°36′11″W	1056802	Upload Photo	
Manor Farmhouse	Beercrocombe	Farmhouse	1600	ST3230620594; 50°58′51″N 2°57′56″W	1249063	Upload Photo	
Manor Farmhouse	Charlton Mackrell	Farmhouse	Medieval	ST5293328572; 51°03′16″N 2°40′22″W	1056724	Upload Photo	
Manor Farmhouse	High Ham	Farmhouse	17th century	ST4261231155; 51°04′37″N 2°49′14″W	1235211	Upload Photo	
Manor Farmhouse	Tatworth and Forton	Farmhouse	Late Medieval	ST3357006992; 50°51′31″N 2°56′43″W	1248812	Upload Photo	
Manor Farmhouse	West and Middle Chinnock	Farmhouse	Late 16th century/early 17th century	ST4731713286; 50°55′00″N 2°45′03″W	1057127	Upload Photo	
Manor Farmhouse and front boundary railings	Ash	Farmhouse	Early 17th century	ST4793120570; 50°58′56″N 2°44′35″W	1056534	Upload Photo	
Manor House	Abbas and Templecombe	House	17th century	ST7091922094; 50°59′51″N 2°24′57″W	1056356	Upload Photo	
Manor House	Marston Magna	House	1613	ST5930322306; 50°59′55″N 2°34′53″W	1056828	Upload Photo	
Manor House	Misterton	House	Mid 18th century	ST4533408165; 50°52′13″N 2°46′42″W	1308208	Upload Photo	
Manor House, King Ina's Palace	South Petherton	House	16th century	ST4332917091; 50°57′02″N 2°48′29″W	1056956	Upload Photo	
Maperton House	Maperton	House	1802	ST6717226190; 51°02′03″N 2°28′10″W	1177942	Upload Photo	
Merefield House	Crewkerne	House	Mid 17th century	ST4427909859; 50°53′08″N 2°47′37″W	1208219	Upload Photo	
Mid Lambrook Manor	Kingsbury Episcopi	Farmhouse	c. 1500	ST4227118384; 50°57′43″N 2°49′24″W	1264344	Mid Lambrook Manor	
Middlethorpe House	Curry Rivel	House	17th century	ST3909525016; 51°01′17″N 2°52′11″W	1249233	Upload Photo	
Mill, attached House and former Drying Kiln	West Crewkerne	Watermill	1793	ST4191707942; 50°52′05″N 2°49′36″W	1400079	Upload Photo	
Monks' Reredorter, Muchelney Abbey	Muchelney	Privy House	13th century	ST4287324820; 51°01′12″N 2°48′57″W	1056573	Monks' Reredorter, Muchelney Abbey More images	
Monmouth House and attached Walls and Railings	Chard	House	1770-1790	ST3245108656; 50°52′24″N 2°57′41″W	1205613	Monmouth House and attached Walls and Railings	
Naish's Farm House, with front boundary wall and gate piers	West Camel	Farmhouse	Early 18th century	ST5767324571; 51°01′08″N 2°36′17″W	1345993	Upload Photo	
National Westminster Bank	Crewkerne	Bank	1838	ST4409009737; 50°53′04″N 2°47′46″W	1208423	National Westminster Bank More images	
3 (Hayes End Manor), 5 and 7, Hayes End	South Petherton	House	c. 1600	ST4360716684; 50°56′49″N 2°48′15″W	1056974	3 (Hayes End Manor), 5 and 7, Hayes End	
18 and 20, High Street	Bruton	House	16th century	ST6831534867; 51°06′44″N 2°27′14″W	1056419	Upload Photo	
17, North Street	Chiselborough	House	Possibly Late 16th century	ST4691414986; 50°55′55″N 2°45′24″W	1251532	Upload Photo	
9, Church Street	Crewkerne	House	Mid 19th century	ST4402409757; 50°53′04″N 2°47′50″W	1202987	Upload Photo	
29, Court Barton	Ilminster	House	Early 16th century	ST3603814615; 50°55′39″N 2°54′41″W	1207652	Upload Photo	
28, Court Barton	Ilminster	House	1586	ST3603714614; 50°55′39″N 2°54′41″W	1298320	Upload Photo	
21, Woolston Road	North Cadbury	House	15th century	ST6355527247; 51°02′36″N 2°31′16″W	1056206	Upload Photo	
North Perrott Manor House / Perrott Hill School	North Perrott	House	1877	ST4675509645; 50°53′02″N 2°45′30″W	1175931	North Perrott Manor House / Perrott Hill School More images	
2 and 3, and attached railings, gate piers and gates	Whitelackington	House	Early 19th century	ST3654814579; 50°55′38″N 2°54′15″W	1195064	Upload Photo	
19–21, attached gateway and outbuildings to the rear of No. 19, Silver Street	Ilminster	House	Possible 17th century	ST3603714516; 50°55′36″N 2°54′41″W	1208520	Upload Photo	
Old Somerton Mill	Somerton	House	16th century	ST4981628475; 51°03′12″N 2°43′03″W	1346032	Upload Photo	
Oscars	Crewkerne	House	Early 16th century	ST4410409827; 50°53′07″N 2°47′46″W	1202968	Upload Photo	
Oxenford House, and the cottage attached to west gable with pump	Dowlish Wake	Farmhouse	17th century	ST359124; 50°54′30″N 2°54′44″W	1307531	Upload Photo	
Pavyotts Mill House	East Coker	Mill House	c. 1600	ST5516813249; 50°55′01″N 2°38′21″W	1307789	Pavyotts Mill House	
Pen Pits	Penselwood	House	1935	ST7670731532; 51°04′57″N 2°20′02″W	1274243	Upload Photo	
Penny Tombstone, in churchyard 11 metres south of chancel, Church of St Peter and St Paul	Charlton Horethorne	Tombstone	Late 17th century	ST6654323055; 51°00′21″N 2°28′42″W	1056367	Upload Photo	
Physicwell House	Stoke Trister	Farmhouse	Converted 1819	ST7278327898; 51°02′59″N 2°23′23″W	1238359	Upload Photo	
Pittards Farmhouse	Kingsbury Episcopi	Farmhouse	17th century	ST4329018759; 50°57′56″N 2°48′32″W	1345545	Upload Photo	
Prankerd Chest Tomb, in churchyard 7 metres south east of south door, Church of St John Evangelist	Milborne Port	Chest Tomb	Early 17th century	ST6764318521; 50°57′55″N 2°27′44″W	1174727	Upload Photo	
Priory Farmhouse	Hinton St George	House	14th century/15th century	ST4199012599; 50°54′36″N 2°49′35″W	1175241	Upload Photo Priory Farmhouse More images	
Privy about 35 metres south of the Manor House	Chilthorne Domer	Privy House	Mid 18th century	ST5239518921; 50°58′04″N 2°40′46″W	1057248	Upload Photo	
Red Lion Hotel, with front boundary railings attached	Somerton	Hotel	17th/18th century	ST4911328551; 51°03′15″N 2°43′39″W	1177452	Red Lion Hotel, with front boundary railings attached More images	
Rodwell Manor	Kingsbury Episcopi	House	1988	ST4095018945; 50°58′01″N 2°50′32″W	1264305	Rodwell Manor More images	
Rowland's Farm House, and attached outbuildings around courtyard on north side, including well	Ashill	Farmhouse	c. 1750	ST3430716359; 50°56′34″N 2°56′11″W	1057097	Upload Photo	
Rowland's Mill	Ashill	Mill House	Late 17th century	ST3446816210; 50°56′30″N 2°56′03″W	1345847	Upload Photo	
Stable block about 70 metres west of Brympton House	Brympton	House	c. 1720	ST5186315446; 50°56′11″N 2°41′11″W	1057265	Stable block about 70 metres west of Brympton House More images	
Standerwick Farm	Babcary	Farmhouse	c. 1400	ST5820629174; 51°03′37″N 2°35′52″W	1248456	Upload Photo	
Stapleton Farmhouse	Martock	Farmhouse	Medieval	ST4633921001; 50°59′09″N 2°45′57″W	1227081	Upload Photo	
Stembridge Mill	High Ham	Mill	1897	ST4328230517; 51°04′16″N 2°48′39″W	1235260	Stembridge Mill More images	
Stocklinch Grove	Stocklinch	House	1653	ST3831117106; 50°57′00″N 2°52′46″W	1345871	Stocklinch Grove	
United Reformed Church	Stoke-sub-Hamdon	Church	1866	ST4733417531; 50°57′17″N 2°45′04″W	1260181	United Reformed Church More images	
Summerhouse about 15 metres north west of the Manor House	Norton Sub Hamdon	House	18th century	ST4677115935; 50°56′25″N 2°45′32″W	1241090	Upload Photo	
Swadel Chest Tomb, 8 metres south of the south door of the chancel, Church of St Peter	Yeovilton	Chest Tomb	1593	ST5456124910; 51°01′18″N 2°38′57″W	1175211	Upload Photo	
The Chantry	Ilminster	House	Mid 15th century	ST3598814606; 50°55′38″N 2°54′44″W	1207664	Upload Photo	
The Chantry	Martock	House	14th century	ST4620619170; 50°58′10″N 2°46′03″W	1066030	Upload Photo	
The Choughs Public House	Chard	House	Early 17th century or late 16th century	ST3206408593; 50°52′22″N 2°58′01″W	1280479	The Choughs Public House More images	
The Coign	Rimpton	House	16th century	ST6085721642; 50°59′34″N 2°33′33″W	1295557	Upload Photo	
The Court	Charlton Mackrell	House	1792	ST5279028444; 51°03′12″N 2°40′30″W	1056732	More images	
The Dovecot, 30 metres north east of Godminster Manor	Pitcombe	Dovecote	17th century	ST6840833030; 51°05′45″N 2°27′09″W	1251807	Upload Photo	
The Dower House	Tintinhull	House	Later 17th century	ST5000719795; 50°58′31″N 2°42′48″W	1227288	Upload Photo	
The former ropewalk 75 metres north west of Millbrook House	West Coker	Ropewalk	c. 1886	ST5121713698; 50°55′14″N 2°41′43″W	1057092	Upload Photo	
The Gables	Stoke-sub-Hamdon	House	c. 1600	ST4739417644; 50°57′21″N 2°45′01″W	1242144	Upload Photo	
The Garden Sculpture, 20 metres north of porch to Shanks House	Cucklington	Sculpture	Probably 18th century	ST7534226684; 51°02′20″N 2°21′11″W	1056388	Upload Photo	
The Granary, 20 metres east of Godminster Manor	Pitcombe	Granary	18th century	ST6840633008; 51°05′44″N 2°27′09″W	1251988	Upload Photo	
The Grotto at Jordans	Ashill	Grotto	1828	ST3388016010; 50°56′23″N 2°56′33″W	1057070	Upload Photo	
The Guildhall	Chard	Corn Exchange	1834	ST3222308558; 50°52′21″N 2°57′53″W	1197456	The Guildhall More images	
The Hext Almshouses	Somerton	Almshouse	1626	ST4880728508; 51°03′13″N 2°43′54″W	1295258	The Hext Almshouses More images	
The Langport Arms Hotel	Langport	Hotel	16th century	ST4199426756; 51°02′14″N 2°49′43″W	1056611	The Langport Arms Hotel More images	
The Limes	Curry Rivel	House	Early 18th century	ST3894625312; 51°01′26″N 2°52′19″W	1249458	Upload Photo	
The Lodge, about 165m south-south-west of Montacute House	Montacute	House	16th century	ST4981917011; 50°57′01″N 2°42′57″W	1252028	The Lodge, about 165m south-south-west of Montacute House More images	
The Manor House	Barton St David	House	19th century	ST5418932358; 51°05′19″N 2°39′20″W	1176131	Upload Photo	
The Manor House	Bruton	House	15th century	ST6617434296; 51°06′25″N 2°29′04″W	1366340	Upload Photo	
The Manor House	Curry Mallet	House	15th century	ST3283721846; 50°59′31″N 2°57′30″W	1249147	Upload Photo	
The Manor House	Long Sutton	House	Late 15th century	ST4692225246; 51°01′27″N 2°45′29″W	1264755	Upload Photo	
The Manor House	North Cadbury	House	1723	ST6401329331; 51°03′44″N 2°30′54″W	1366409	Upload Photo	
The Market Cross	Somerton	Market Cross	Rebuilt 1673	ST4905828538; 51°03′14″N 2°43′41″W	1177350	The Market Cross More images	
Market House	Castle Cary	Market House	1855	ST6409232381; 51°05′23″N 2°30′51″W	1056254	Market House More images	
The Market House	Somerton	House	17th century	ST4901028546; 51°03′14″N 2°43′44″W	1056698	Upload Photo	
The Music Room, 90 metres north west of Pen Pits	Penselwood	Summerhouse	1935	ST7645331642; 51°05′01″N 2°20′15″W	1274224	Upload Photo	
The Old Cottage	Charlton Mackrell	House	16th century	ST5251928309; 51°03′08″N 2°40′44″W	1056733	Upload Photo	
The Old Parsonage	Ansford	House	17th century	ST6405933057; 51°05′44″N 2°30′53″W	1366372	Upload Photo	
The Old Parsonage	Somerton	House	Early 17th century	ST4934528372; 51°03′09″N 2°43′27″W	1177683	Upload Photo	
The Old Rectory	Chaffcombe	House	15th century	ST3499810183; 50°53′15″N 2°55′32″W	1366437	Upload Photo	
The Old Rectory, with boundary wall attached to south east corner	Ashill	House	16th century	ST3217717336; 50°57′05″N 2°58′01″W	1295733	Upload Photo	
The Pines	Castle Cary	House	Late 18th century	ST6442032445; 51°05′25″N 2°30′34″W	1056229	Upload Photo	
The Priory	Bruton	House	15th century	ST6824334815; 51°06′42″N 2°27′18″W	1176057	The Priory More images	
The Priory, including attached wall with 2 gatepiers to left	Barrington	House	Late medieval	ST3876118278; 50°57′38″N 2°52′24″W	1345924	Upload Photo	
The railings, gate and gate piers about 9 metes south of Donisthorpe	Somerton	Gate	Probably 18th century	ST4909628669; 51°03′18″N 2°43′40″W	1056688	Upload Photo	
The Rectory	West Camel	House	Early 15th century	ST5791424562; 51°01′08″N 2°36′05″W	1175050	The Rectory	
The Towers	Bruton	Gate	Late 18th century	ST6854032467; 51°05′26″N 2°27′02″W	1176423	Upload Photo	
The Unicorn	Somerton	Inn	Late Medieval or 16th century	ST4886328525; 51°03′14″N 2°43′51″W	1056646	The Unicorn More images	
The Vicarage	Somerton	House	Medieval	ST4899628645; 51°03′18″N 2°43′45″W	1177266	Upload Photo	
The Village Cross	Hinton St George	Village Cross	Late medieval	ST4197112623; 50°54′37″N 2°49′36″W	1056096	The Village Cross More images	
Thorne Chest Tomb, 2 metres north of organ chamber door, churchyard of Church of St Lawrence	Cucklington	Chest Tomb	1617	ST7552327781; 51°02′56″N 2°21′02″W	1346186	Upload Photo	
Top Mill Building	Castle Cary	Factory	Mid 19th century	ST6355532321; 51°05′21″N 2°31′18″W	1056226	Upload Photo	
Triumphal arch gateway to Hazelgrove House	Sparkford	Gate	Early 20th century	ST6004125940; 51°01′53″N 2°34′16″W	1272919	Triumphal arch gateway to Hazelgrove House More images	
Tudor Cottage	Broadway	Farmhouse	16th century	ST3198815428; 50°56′03″N 2°58′09″W	1057044	Upload Photo	
Two monuments in churchyard, about 6 and 8 metres south of south transept, Church of St Mary the Virgin	Stoke-sub-Hamdon	Chest Tomb	Mid 17th century	ST4839617260; 50°57′09″N 2°44′10″W	1242030	Upload Photo	
Under Sheriff's Office	South Petherton	House	20th century	ST4318416877; 50°56′55″N 2°48′37″W	1056926	Upload Photo	
Unitarian Church and attached schoolhouse to the north	Ilminster	Church	1846	ST3630814548; 50°55′37″N 2°54′27″W	1298327	Upload Photo	
Wales Cottages, row of cottages about 10 metres north east of Wales Farmhouse	Queen Camel	House	15th century	ST5849024662; 51°01′11″N 2°35′35″W	1248860	Upload Photo	
Wales Farmhouse	Queen Camel	Farmhouse	17th century	ST5844224649; 51°01′11″N 2°35′38″W	1248859	Upload Photo	
Walls, gate piers, gates and railings to Merefield House	Crewkerne	Gate	Late 17th century	ST4428009842; 50°53′07″N 2°47′37″W	1281891	Upload Photo	
Weston Farmhouse	Wambrook	Farmhouse	Late medieval	ST2912909117; 50°52′38″N 3°00′31″W	1249296	Upload Photo	
Weston House	East Chinnock	Farmhouse	17th century	ST4925813411; 50°55′05″N 2°43′24″W	1057208	Upload Photo	
Weylands	Kingsbury Episcopi	House	16th century	ST4143118622; 50°57′51″N 2°50′07″W	1057725	Upload Photo	
White Horse Hotel	Wincanton	Hotel	1733	ST7135928633; 51°03′23″N 2°24′36″W	1274102	Upload Photo	
Whitelackington House, and gazebos to south east and south west corners	Whitelackington	House	17th century	ST3796315242; 50°56′00″N 2°53′03″W	1308161	Upload Photo	
Wing to Barrington Court	Barrington	House	1674	ST3977218259; 50°57′38″N 2°51′32″W	1056932	Wing to Barrington Court More images	
Woodlands Farmhouse	Isle Abbotts	Farmhouse	17th century	ST3443519813; 50°58′26″N 2°56′07″W	1249931	Upload Photo	
Yarlington House	Yarlington	House	1782	ST6592328724; 51°03′25″N 2°29′15″W	1056215	Upload Photo	

== See also ==
- Grade II* listed buildings in Somerset
- Grade I listed buildings in South Somerset
