= East Lambrook =

Village in Somerset, England

Coordinates: 50.9676°N 2.8110°W

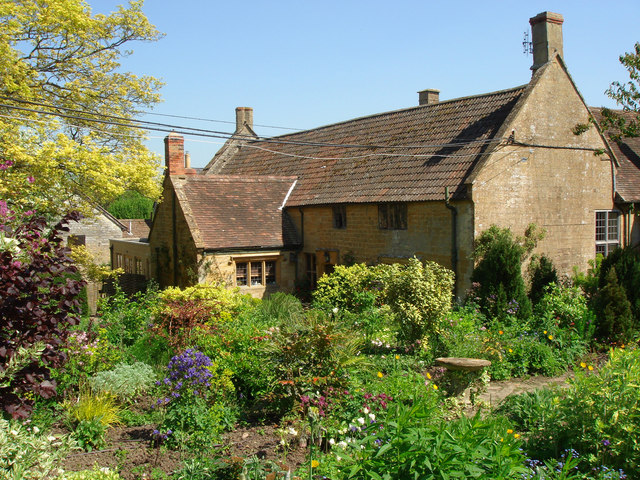
- East Lambrook Manor

- Location within Somerset
- OS grid reference: ST431190
- Civil parish: Kingsbury Episcopi
- Unitary authority: Somerset
- Ceremonial county: Somerset
- Region: South West
- Country: England
- Sovereign state: United Kingdom
- Post town: SOUTH PETHERTON
- Postcode district: TA13
- Dialling code: 01460
- Police: Avon and Somerset
- Fire: Devon and Somerset
- Ambulance: South Western
- UK Parliament: Glastonbury and Somerton

East Lambrook is an English village situated in the civil parish of Kingsbury Episcopi, within the South Somerset district of Somerset. It is noted particularly for its manor gardens.

== Manor ==
East Lambrook Manor is a small 15th-century manor house classed by English Heritage as a Grade II* listed building.

The manor was bought in 1939 by Margery Fish and her husband W. G. Fish. The gardens were planted by Margery Fish from 1938 until her death in 1969. She wrote several books on such "cottage gardens", some still in print, and held the National Collection of Geraniums. She also assembled a large collection of snowdrop species.

The gardens have been preserved and remain open to the public under subsequent owners.

== Amenities ==
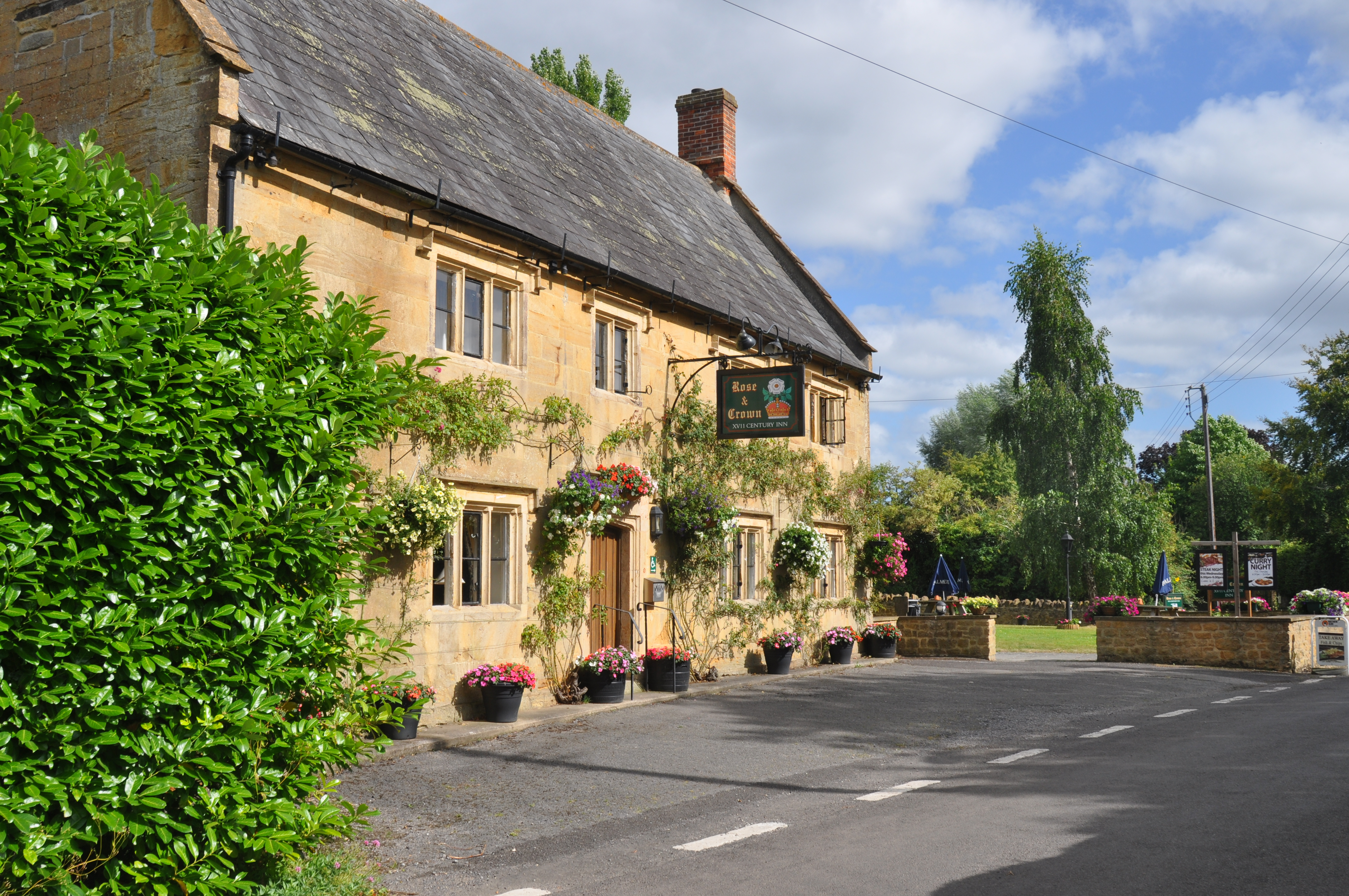
The Rose and Crown

The Anglican Church of St James, also a Grade II* listed building, dates from the 12th century. Although in the civil parish of Kingsbury Episcopi, the village is part of the benefice of South Petherton with the Seavingtons and the Lambrooks, within the Diocese of Bath and Wells.

The pub in the village is the Rose and Crown, which dates from the 17th century.

Other nearby places of interest include the Burrow Hill Cider Farm, where apple cider and apple brandy are made by traditional methods.

== Communications ==
The village has a service of one Monday-to-Friday bus between the villages of Isle Brewers and Street, Somerset. The nearest railway station is Yeovil Pen Mill (10 miles, 16 km).

The A303 main road between Basingstoke, Hampshire, and Honiton, Devon, passes 2.5 miles (4 km) to the south of the village.
