= Chard School =

Chard Prep School
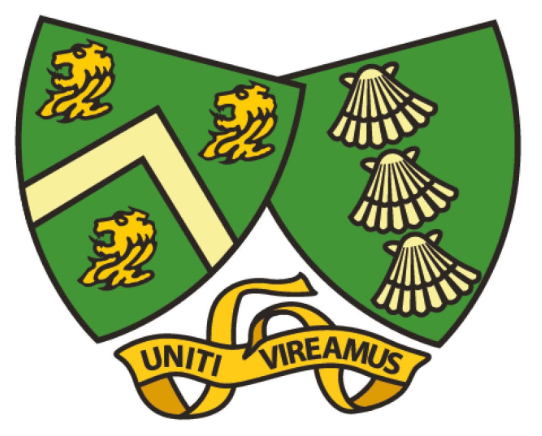

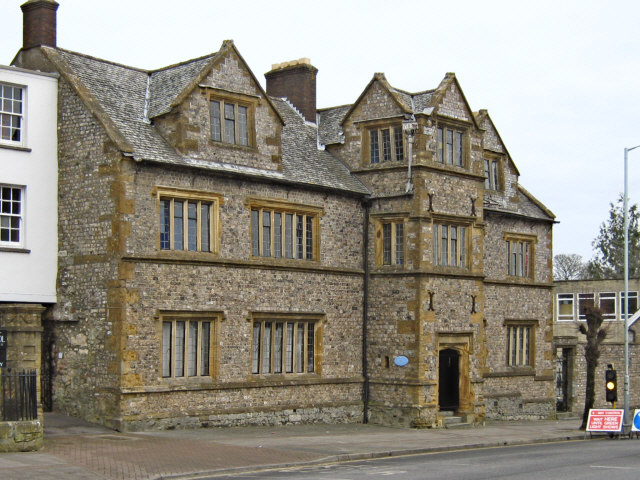
- School premises (Built 1583)

Location
- Monmouth House, Fore Street, Chard, Somerset, England, TA20 1QA
- Coordinates: 50.8734°N 2.9610°W

Information
- Type: Private school Preparatory
- Motto: Latin: Uniti Vireamus (United we thrive)
- Established: 1671; 355 years ago
- Founder: William Symes
- Local authority: Somerset Council
- Department for Education URN: 123927 Tables
- Gender: Co-educational
- Age range: 4–11
- Enrolment: 60
- Capacity: 120
- Listed Building: Grade II*
- Listed Building Reference: 1205594
- Date of Listing: 24 March 1950
- Website: https://www.chardprep.co.uk/

Chard Prep School is a coeducational private school for children ages 4 to 11 located in the town of Chard in the English county of Somerset.

The school is located on the site of the former Chard Grammar School.

== History ==
The school was originally a private residence, built for John Symes of Poundsford in 1583. Later in 1671, his son, William Symes, handed the property over to twelve trustees for conversion into a grammar school. It later became a public boarding school in 1890.

The current independent preparatory school, known as Chard School, was established in 1972, and still incorporates the original grammar school building. The 16th-century building has been Grade II* listed since 1950. It is also on Historic England's Heritage at Risk Register, where it is described as being in poor condition.

== Architecture ==
The two-storey flint building has hamstone dressings, a tiled roof and brick chimney stacks. The front of the building has a three-room range and a projecting three-storey porch. Many of the rooms have fireplaces, panelling and decorations from the 16th to 19th centuries. In the 18th century a staircase was added giving access to the adjacent Monmouth House which was built between 1770 and 1790.
