= Henry Adams (farmer) =

English colonial farmer (1583–1646)

- Born: January 21, 1583; Barton St. David, Somerset, Kingdom of England
- Died: October 6, 1646 (aged 63); Braintree, Massachusetts Bay
- Occupation: Farmer
- Spouse: Edith Squire
- Children: 10
- Parent(s): John Adams of Barton St. David; Agnes Stone
- Relatives: Adams family

Henry Adams (January 21, 1583 – October 6, 1646) was an English colonial farmer. Also known as Henry Adams of Braintree, he was a patrilineal emigrant ancestor of U.S. Presidents John Adams and John Quincy Adams, great-great-grandfather of U.S. Founding Father Samuel Adams, and 9th great-grandfather of U.S. President Calvin Coolidge.

== Early life ==
Henry Adams was born in Barton St. David, Somerset, to John Adams (1555–1604) and Agnes Stone (1556–1616). He emigrated from Braintree, Essex, in England to what soon became Braintree, Massachusetts, in about 1632–1633.

While his great-great-great-grandson, President John Quincy Adams, believed Henry Adams to have been born in Braintree, Essex, numerous records have shown Henry Adams to have been born and raised in the village of Barton St. David in Somerset, England.

Henry Adams most likely moved to Braintree upon maturity to work for the Hooker company, which then arranged for his passage to America.

== Settling in Massachusetts ==
He was one of the earliest settlers of the Massachusetts Bay Colony. He is likely to have arrived in the area with his wife, Edith Squire (1587–1672/73) and eight sons and a daughter, in 1632. Braintree was incorporated in 1640, and included what is now Quincy, and Braintree.

== Personal life ==
He married Edith Squire on 19 October 1609 in Charlton Mackrell, Somerset, England. They had nine children: Henry Adams Jr. (1609–1676), Thomas Adams (1612–1688), Samuel Adams (1617–1688), Ursula Adams (1619–1679), Jonathan Adams (1620–1690), Peter Adams (1622–1690), John Adams II (1622–1706), Joseph Adams (1626–1694), and Edward Adams (1629–1716).

== Falsified and incorrect genealogies ==
Genealogist Charles Henry Browning contributed to a bogus lineage for Henry Adams, who emigrated from Barton St. David, Somerset, England to Braintree, Massachusetts. Henry Adams' great-grandfather was a lowly tenant farmer, but, in 1853, a forged document fooled the editors of the New England Historical and Genealogical Register (NEHGR), and the false lineage was republished in 1893 in Browning's "Americans of Royal Descent". The NEHGR has diligently tried to warn its readers about this false lineage disseminated by such as the Register's 1902 book notice of the Reverend Hiram Fairbanks' "The Ancestry of Henry Adams of Braintree, New England".

It is widely believed that the claim Henry Adams and, thus, his descendants U.S. Presidents John Adams and John Quincy Adams, is descended from the Welsh political family, also called Adams, is false. The Welsh prefix "Ap" (meaning "son of") often appears in the Welsh Adams family but not in the name of the Somerset family. These mistakes and false assumptions are frequent in early attempts at genealogy.

== Legacy ==
John Adams, the second president of the United States of America, erected a monument to his memory in the old church yard at Quincy with the following inscription: "In memory of Henry Adams who took his flight from the Dragon persecution in Devonshire, England and alighted with eight sons, near Mount Wollaston. One of the sons returned to England, and after taking time to explore the country, four removed to Medfield and the neighboring towns; two to Chelmsford. One only, Joseph, who lies here at his left hand, remained here, who was an original proprietor in the township of Braintree, incorporated in 1639. This stone and several others have been placed in this yard, by a great-great grandson, from a veneration of the Piety, humility, simplicity, prudence, patience, temperance, frugality, industry and perseverance, of his Ancestors, in hopes of Recommending an imitation of their virtures to their posterity. ... Erected December, 1823."

However, President John Quincy Adams dissented from the opinion of his father that Henry Adams came from Devonshire. He believed that: "After giving the matter particular and thorough investigation... my conviction is that Henry Adams was from Braintree in the county of Essex, on the east coast of England."

Henry may have been in the company of Thomas Hooker, who arrived in September 1633. The Hooker company was mostly made up from immigrants of Chelmsford, perhaps from Braintree and other neighboring villages of Essex, who had arrived just to the new colony the year before. Winthrop's Journal, I. 37, says, "1632: 14 Aug; The Braintree Company which had begun to settle down at Mt. Wollaston by order of Court, removed to Newtown. These were Mr. Hooker’s Company." Hence it appears highly probable that Henry Adams from Braintree in Essex joined Hooker's Company and arrived in Boston in 1632. Dr. James Savage, author of the Genealogical Dictionary of the early first-comers of New England states that Henry "came early to our country, and tradit. says from Braintree, in Co. Essex in 1632".
