= Church of St Mary, Hardington Mandeville =

Church in Somerset, England

Church of St Mary
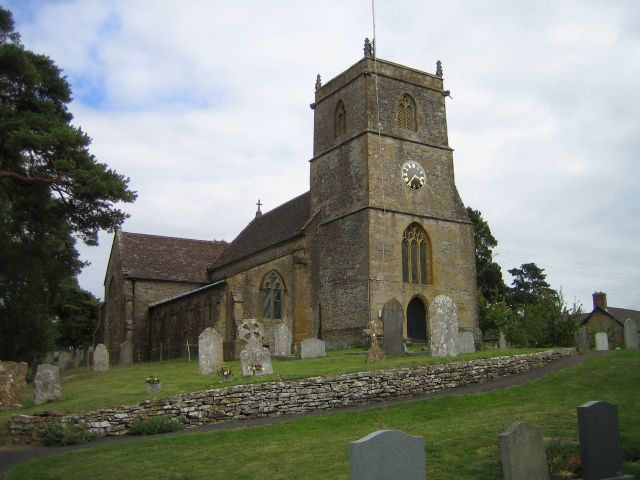

- Location within Somerset
- 50.9048°N 2.6949°W
- Location: Hardington Mandeville, Somerset, England

History
- Built: 1123

Listed Building – Grade II*
- Official name: Church of St Mary
- Designated: 19 April 1961
- Reference no.: 1345795

The Anglican Church of St Mary in Hardington Mandeville, Somerset, England was built in 1123. It is a Grade II* listed building.

== History ==
The church was built in 1123 on the site of an earlier church. Major restoration was carried out in the 15th century with further Victorian restoration in 1864, which included the rebuilding of the chancel.

The clock mechanism was built and installed before 1707.

The parish is part of the Coker Ridge benefice within the Diocese of Bath and Wells.

== Architecture ==
The church is built of the local limestone called hamstone. It has a tiled roof. The three-stage tower remains from the 1123 building. There were six bells in the tower, three of which are from the Purdue (Closworth) foundry, with the earliest being dated 1591. Two further bells were added in 1974.

The circular font is thought to be original, dating from 1123; it is made of hamstone, has carvings around the rim and stands on a cylindrical stem.

In the sanctuary is a triangular carving of a beast with a beak. Its origin is obscure and it is not made from local stone. Gittos suggests it is of the Scandinavian Ringerike style.

== See also ==
- List of ecclesiastical parishes in the Diocese of Bath and Wells
