= Church of All Saints, Closworth =

Church in Somerset, England

Church of All Saints
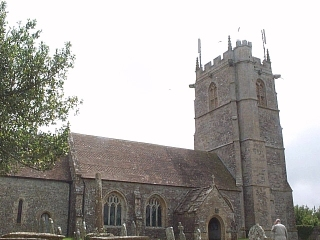

- Location within Somerset
- 50.8884°N 2.6213°W
- Location: Closworth, Somerset, England

Listed Building – Grade II*
- Official name: Church of All Saints
- Designated: 19 April 1961
- Reference no.: 1057233

The Church of All Saints in Closworth, Somerset, England was built in the 13th century. It is a Grade II* listed building.

== History ==
The church was built in the 13th century and added to in the 15th. It underwent a Victorian restoration in 1875.

The parish is part of the Coker Ridge benefice within the Diocese of Bath and Wells.

== Architecture ==
The hamstone building has clay tile roofs. It consists of a four-bay nave and single-bay chancel. The four-stage west tower is supported by angle buttresses.

Inside the church are a 17th-century wooden pulpit and 15th century octagonal font.

In the churchyard is the shaft from a 15th-century hamstone cross.

Thomas Purdue, of the famous Purdue bell-founding family, is buried in the churchyard.

== See also ==
- List of ecclesiastical parishes in the Diocese of Bath and Wells
