= Church of St Mary Magdalene, Barwick =

Church in Somerset, England

Church of St Mary Magdalene
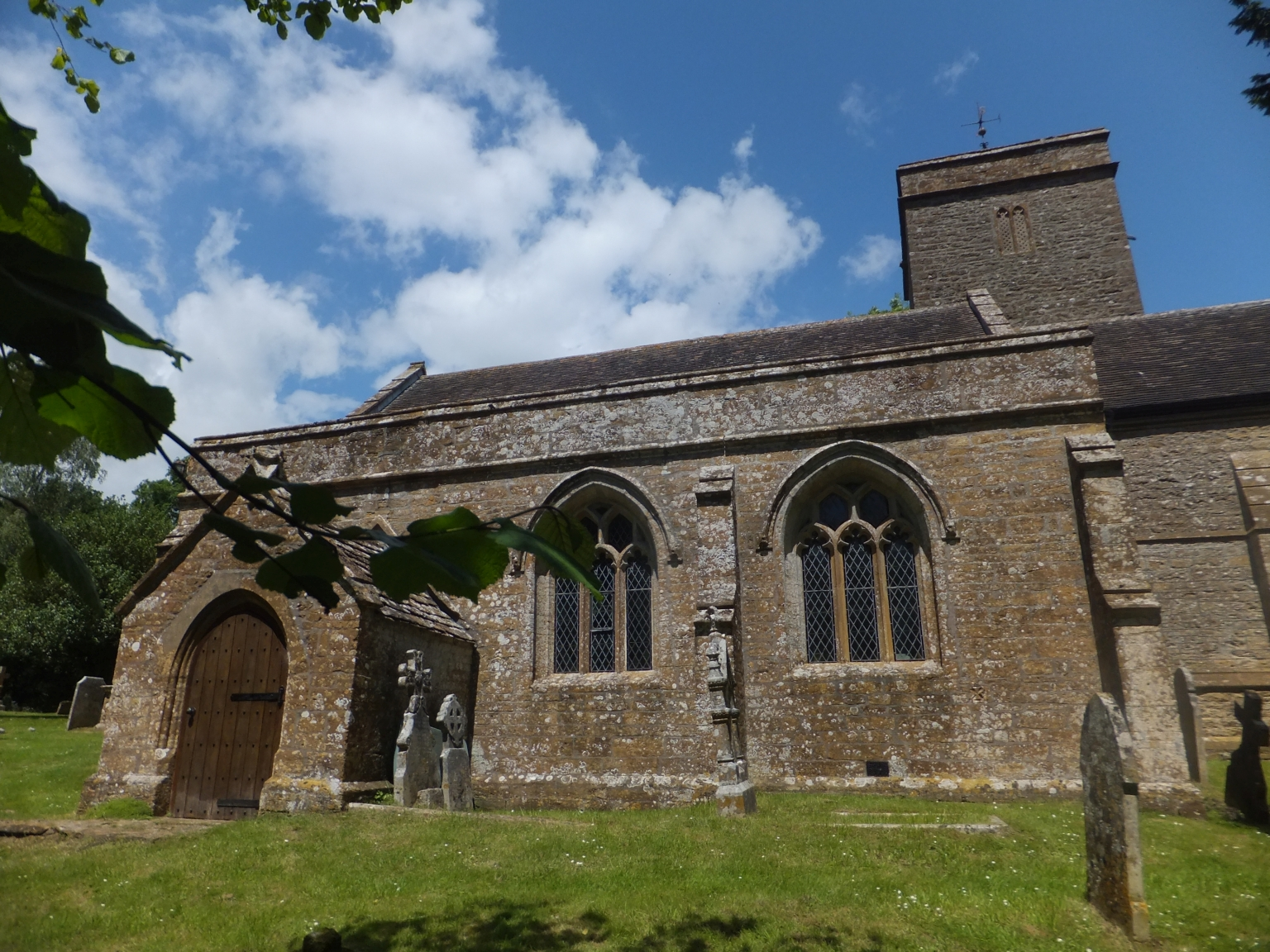

- Location within Somerset
- 50.9225°N 2.6302°W
- Location: Barwick, Somerset, England

History
- Built: 13th century

Listed Building – Grade II*
- Official name: Church of St Mary Magdalene
- Designated: 19 April 1961
- Reference no.: 1057217

The Anglican Church of St Mary Magdalene in Barwick, Somerset, England was built in the 13th century. It is a Grade II* listed building.

== History ==
The church was built in the 13th century. During a Victorian restoration in 1885 the chancel was rebuilt.

Because of the condition of the roofs of the nave, chancel and tower the church has been placed on the Heritage at Risk Register.

The parish is part of the benefice of Yeovil Holy Trinity with Barwick within the Diocese of Bath and Wells.

== Architecture ==
The hamstone building has clay tile roofs. It consists of a three-bay nave and two-bay chancel. The two-stage tower is unbuttressed.

Inside the church is a 14th-century piscina and a pulpit from 1619. The cylindrical fluted hamstone font is lead lined and decorated with cable moulding.
