= Church of St David, Barton St David =

Church in Somerset, England

Church of St David
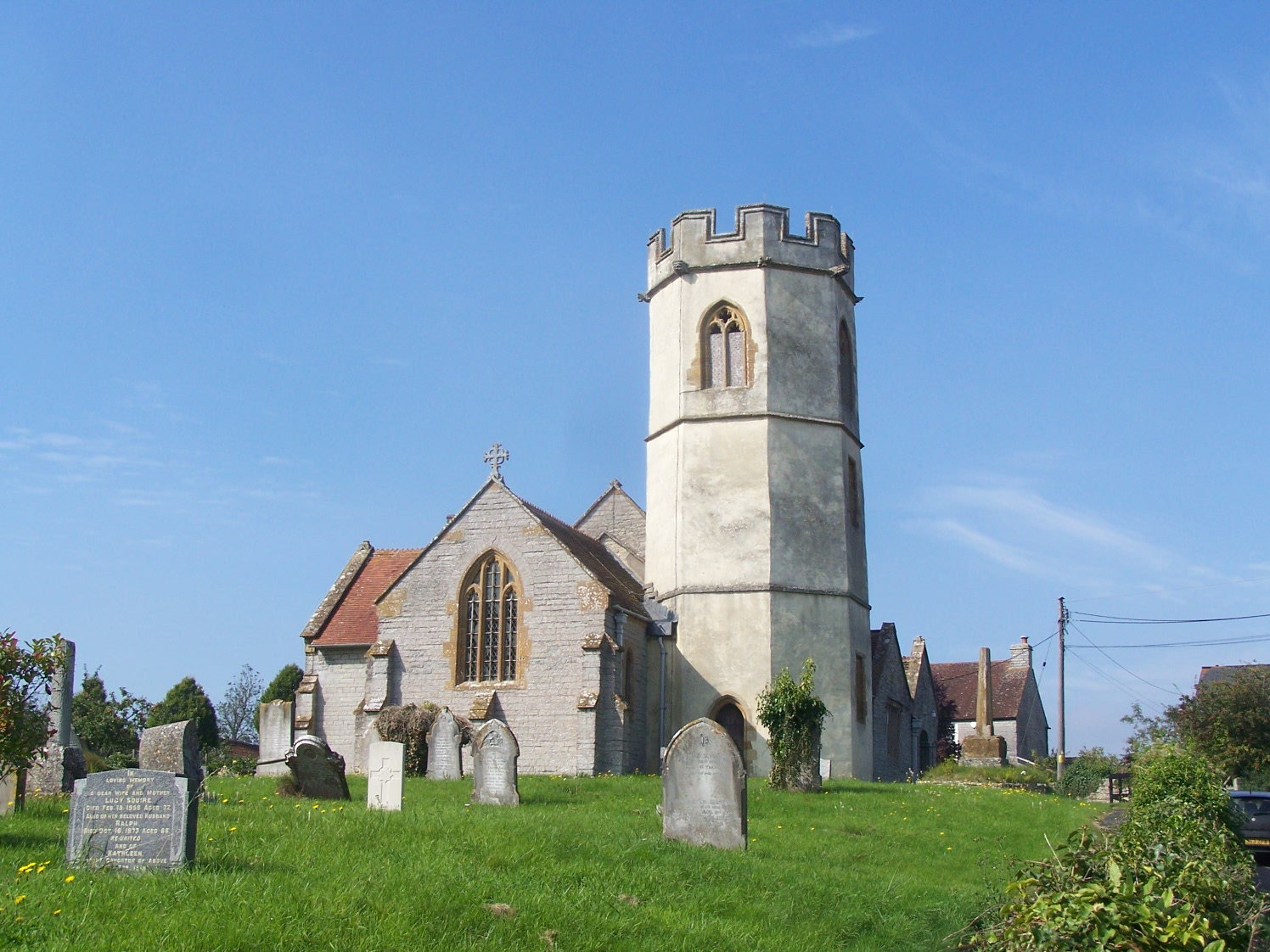

- Location within Somerset
- 51.0827°N 2.6585°W
- Location: Barton St David, Somerset, England

History
- Built: 12th to 15th century

Listed Building – Grade II*
- Official name: Church of St David
- Designated: 17 April 1959
- Reference no.: 1176035

The Anglican Church of St David in Barton St David, Somerset, England, was built in the 12th to 15th centuries. It is a Grade II* listed building.

== History ==
The church was built between the 12th and 15th centuries. It underwent a Victorian restoration in the 19th century.

The parish is part of the Wheathill benefice, within the Diocese of Bath and Wells.

== Architecture ==
The stone building has Doulting stone dressings and a tiled roof. It consists of a two-bay chancel and three-bay nave with one-bay transepts. The three-stage octagonal north-west tower was added in the 15th century. The Norman north doorway is of hamstone.

The interior fittings are mostly 18th or 19th century but there is a 13th-century stone font. Within the church is a roll of honour and memorial to men from the village who fought in World War I.

== See also ==
- List of ecclesiastical parishes in the Diocese of Bath and Wells
