= St Catherine's Church, Drayton =

Church in Somerset, England

Church of St Catherine
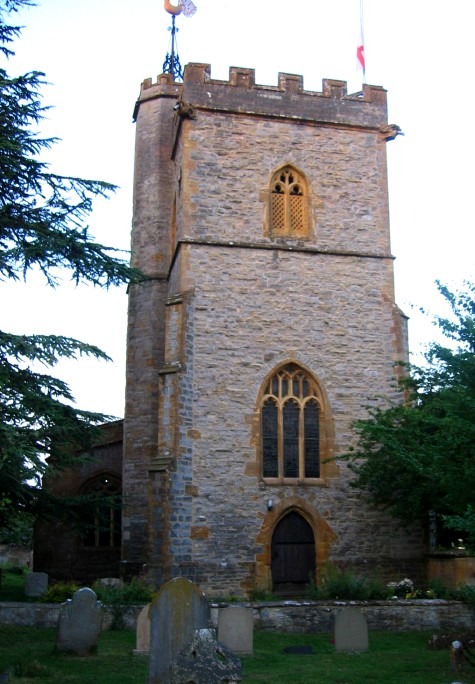

- Location within Somerset
- 51°01′10″N 2°50′57″W
- Location: Drayton, Somerset, England

History
- Built: 15th century

Listed Building – Grade I
- Designated: 17 April 1959
- Reference no.: 1236512

The Church of St Catherine in Drayton, Somerset, England dates from the 15th century. It has been designated as a Grade I listed building.

St Catherine's exterior is blue lias and golden hamstone. It was restored in 1855 by Maurice Davis of Langport and again in 1896.

The 15th-century cross in the churchyard has a sculpture of St Michael with a sword and shield in the act of vanquishing a dragon.

In 2002 plans to put a new floor in the tower provoked objections from parishioners and was eventually resolved by the Ecclesiastical Court.

The rectory, known as Drayton Court, which dates from the early 19th century, is now a private house.

The parish is part of the benefice covered by the Langport Area Team Ministry within the deanery of Ivelchester.

== Stained glass windows ==
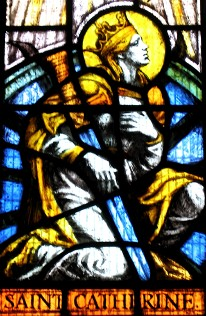
Window showing the namesake saint, Catherine of Alexandria

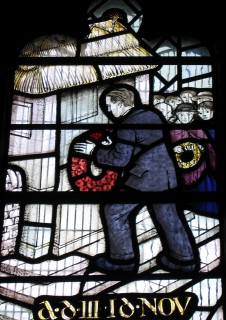
Window depicting the laying of a poppy wreath, honouring soldiers who died in the World Wars

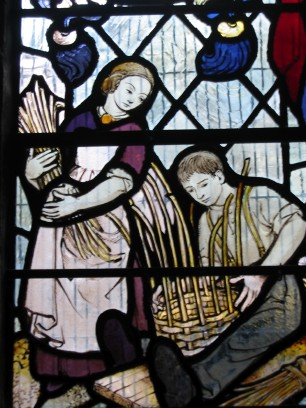
Window depicting basketweaving, a local cottage industry

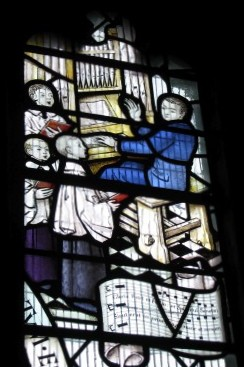
Window depicting the church organist and children's choir

== See also ==
- Grade I listed buildings in South Somerset
- List of Somerset towers
- List of ecclesiastical parishes in the Diocese of Bath and Wells
