= Church of St Mary, Buckland St Mary =

Church in Buckland St Mary, Somerset, England

Church of St Mary
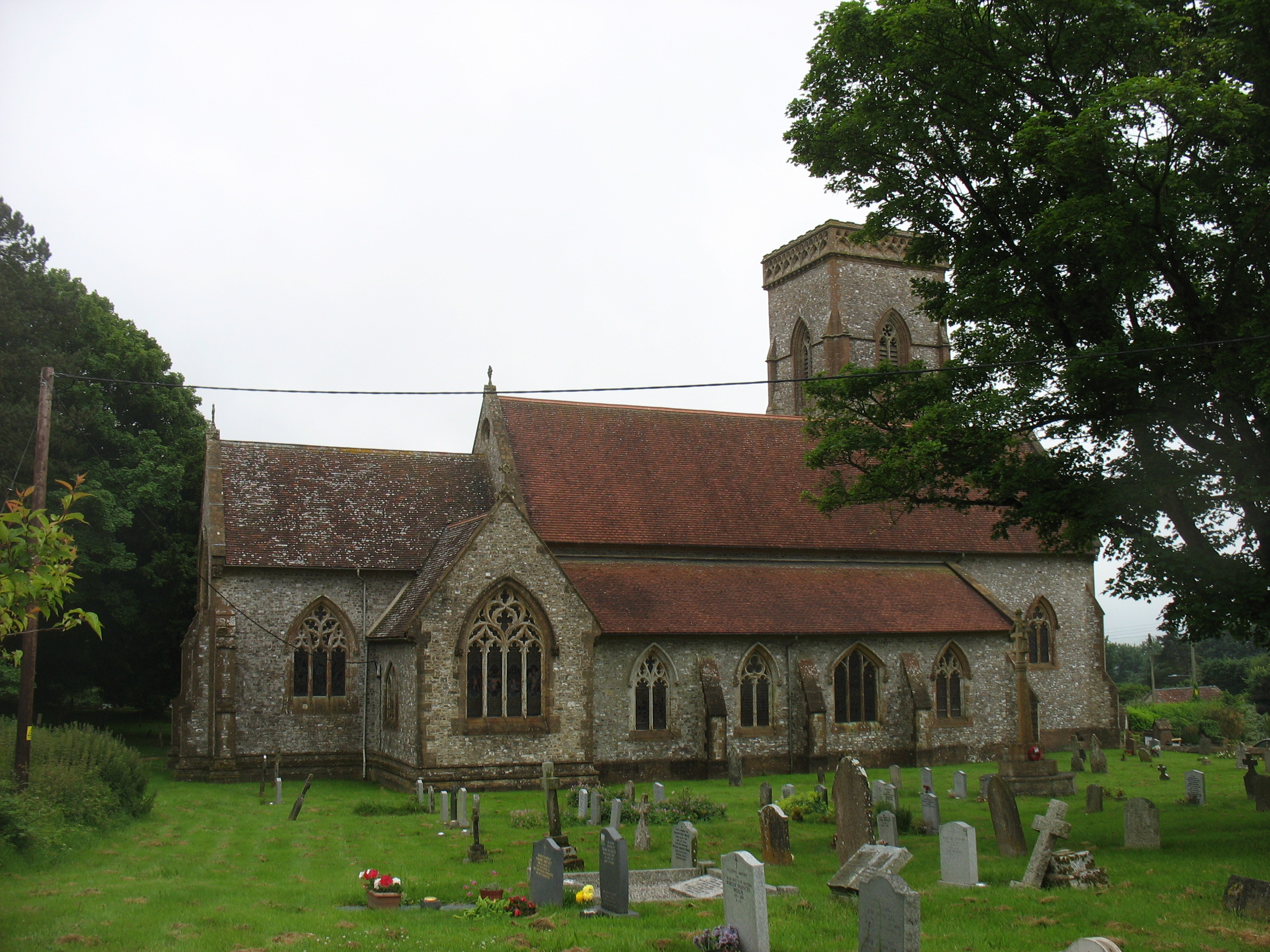

- Location within Somerset
- 50.9155°N 3.0386°W
- Location: Buckland St Mary, Somerset, England

History
- Built: 1853-1863

Site notes
- Architect: Benjamin Ferrey

Listed Building – Grade II*
- Official name: Church of St Mary
- Designated: 4 February 1958
- Reference no.: 1277983

The Anglican Church of St Mary in Buckland St Mary, Somerset, England was built in 1853-1863. It is a Grade II* listed building.

== History ==
The church was built between 1853 and 1863 by Benjamin Ferrey on the site of an earlier church.

The organ was built by Sweatland of Bath and in 1972 was repaired by Osmonds of Taunton. The tower was restored in 1966.

The parish is part of the Blackdown benefice within the Diocese of Bath and Wells.

== Architecture ==
The stone building has hamstone dressings and a clay tile roof. It consists of a six-bay nave, chancel, four-bay north and south aisles and a south chapel. The nave has a hammerbeam roof. The beams of the roof are finely carved and there is a range of sculpture within the church.

The tower is supported by setback buttresses.

In the nave are statues of the 12 Apostles. The stained glass includes work by Clayton and Bell, Charles Eamer Kempe and Michael O’Connor.

There is a notable memorial in the chancel to Mrs Madelina Lance, showing her, with infant son in her arms, breaking out of her tomb at the Resurrection. According to the 'Short History' booklet at the church, the monument was carved by Mr Forsyth of London.

== See also ==
- List of ecclesiastical parishes in the Diocese of Bath and Wells
