= Church of St Mary Magdalene, Sparkford =

Church in Somerset, England

Church of St Mary Magdalene
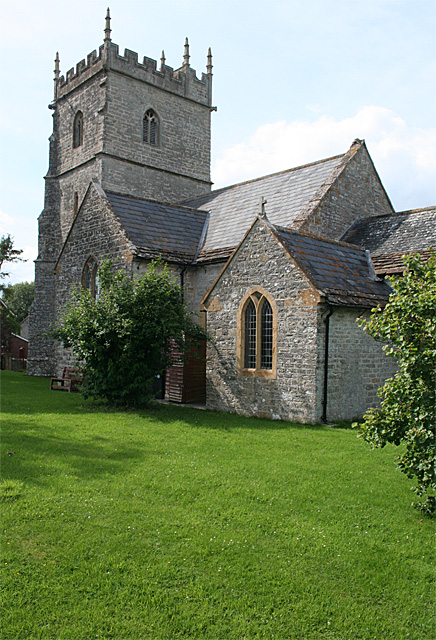

- Location within Somerset
- 51.0290°N 2.5589°W
- Location: Church Road, Sparkford, Somerset, BA22 7JZ England

Listed Building – Grade II*
- Official name: Church of St Mary Magdalene
- Designated: 24 March 1961
- Reference no.: 1243352

The Anglican Church of St Mary Magdalene in Sparkford, Somerset, England was built in the 14th century. It is a Grade II* listed building.

== History ==
The church was built in the 14th century. In 1824 the church was restored and the nave rebuilt.

The parish is part of the Cam Vale benefice within the Diocese of Bath and Wells.

== Architecture ==
The stone building has hamstone dressings and slate roofs. It consists of a three-bay nave and a two-bay chancel with a small chapel and organ to the south. The three-stage tower has an embattled parapet and is supported by corner buttresses.

Most of the interior fittings are from the 19th century, but it does have a 17th-century altar table and pulpit. There are also unusual cast iron bench-ends.

The churchyard is the location of the 20th century philosopher and teacher, John Godolphin Bennett

== See also ==
- List of ecclesiastical parishes in the Diocese of Bath and Wells
