= Samuel Vickery =

British recipient of the Victoria Cross (1873–1952)

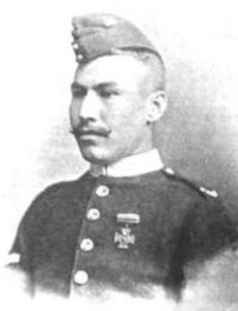
- Born: 6 February 1873; Wambrook, Somerset, England
- Died: 20 June 1952 (aged 79); Cardiff, Wales
- Military career
- Allegiance: United Kingdom
- Branch: British Army
- Rank: Corporal
- Units: The Dorsetshire Regiment
- Conflicts: Tirah Campaign; Second Boer War; World War I
- Awards: Victoria Cross

Samuel Vickery VC (6 February 1873 – 20 June 1952) was a British recipient of the Victoria Cross, the highest and most prestigious award for gallantry in the face of the enemy that can be awarded to British and Commonwealth forces.

== VC details ==
Vickery was 24 years old, and a private in the 1st Battalion, The Dorsetshire Regiment, British Army during the Tirah Campaign in British India when the following deed took place for which he was awarded the VC.

On 20 October 1897 during the attack on the Dargai Heights, Tirah, Private Vickery ran down the slope and rescued a wounded comrade under heavy fire, bringing him back to cover. He subsequently distinguished himself in the Waran Valley, killing three of the enemy who attacked him when he was separated from his company.

== Further information ==
He fought in the Second Boer War and World War I and achieved the rank of corporal.

== The medal ==
His Victoria Cross is displayed at The Keep Military Museum, Dorchester, Dorset, England.
