= Parrett Iron Works =

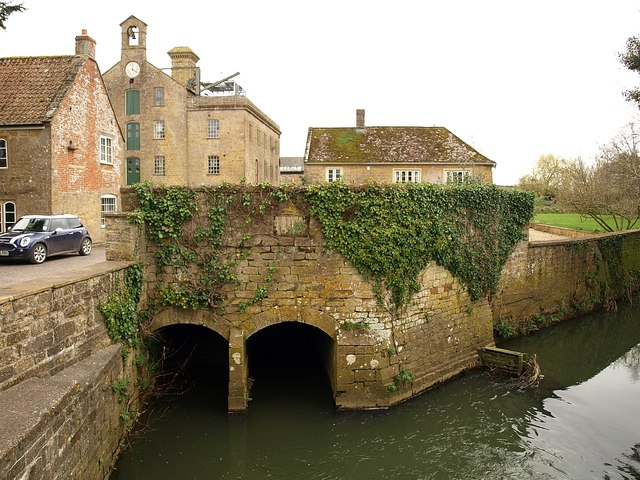
- Parrett Ironworks from the Carey's Mill Bridge

- Location within Somerset
- 50°57′52″N 2°47′28″W
- Location: Near Martock, Somerset, England

History
- Built: 1855

Listed Building – Grade II*
- Official name: Mill at Parrett Iron Works
- Designated: 28 February 1978
- Reference no.: 1225080

Listed Building – Grade II
- Official name: Boiler Chimney
- Designated: 28 February 1978
- Reference no.: 1225752

The Parrett Iron Works was a series of industrial buildings next to the River Parrett, near Martock, Somerset, England.

The site was originally named Carey's Mill, which had been used in the production of snuff, and the adjoining bridge is called Carey's Mill Bridge which was built of Ham stone in the 18th century. The sluice which powered the waterwheel and sluice keepers cottage still exist.

Carey's mill was unoccupied in 1853 but by 1857 had been bought by the West of England Engineering and Coker Canvas Company, who built the mill which included a foundry, with a prominent chimney, a large workshop, and several smaller workshops and cottages. They produced horizontal, high pressure and condensing engines for mining companies traction engines, threshing machines, water wheels, corn mills, flax and spinning machinery, power looms and iron and wooden wheels. In 1866 a new power loom shed was opened, but by 1869 the company had gone into liquidation. It was taken over by William Sibley's West of England Engineering Company, who lasted until the 1920s.

Some buildings were taken over by G H Smith, makers of rope and twine in a ropewalk, workshops and chimneywere still operating in 1941.

In 1974 the premises were held by the West of England Warehouses and also used by the Somervale Foods and Somerset Joinery.
