= Church of St Thomas, Cricket St Thomas =

Church in Somerset, England

Church of St Thomas
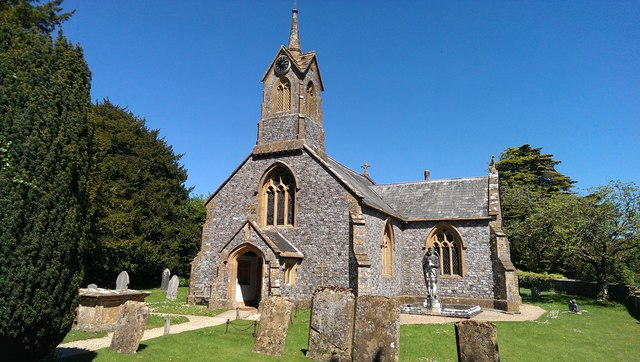

- Location within Somerset
- 50.8733°N 2.8926°W
- Location: Cricket St Thomas, Somerset, England

Listed Building – Grade II*
- Official name: Church of St Thomas
- Designated: 4 February 1958
- Reference no.: 1056183

The Church of St Thomas in Cricket St Thomas, Somerset, England was built in the 14th century and rebuilt in 1868. It is a Grade II* listed building.

== History ==
The church was built in the 14th century although there had been a church on the site from the 12th century. It was rebuilt in 1868 for Lord Bridport.

The parish and benefice of Cricket St Thomas is within the Diocese of Bath and Wells.

== Architecture ==
The flint building has hamstone dressings and slate roofs. It has a two-bay nave and single-bay chancel with a south transept all supported by buttresses.

Above the gable of the wall of the nave is a small tower.

The interior is from the 19th century. The church contains monuments to the families of Hood (Viscount Bridport) and their predecessors the Viscounts Nelson, who gained the title through Horatio Nelson, 1st Viscount Nelson. These include, on the chancel south wall, a commemoration of Alexander Hood, who died in 1814, which was designed and signed by Sir John Soane, with a black marble base topped by a white marble monument on Ionic columns framing the memorial plaque. Mounted on the north nave wall is a fragment of the altar cloth used in the Coronation Service of Queen Elizabeth II.

In the churchyard is a white marble monument, dating from the early 20th century, showing a figure of St Michael. It commemorates Alexander Nelson Hood, 4th Duke of Bronté, 2nd First Viscount Bridport (created in 1868) who died in 1904. A note in the church states that for many years the statue was laid flat, as the white figure at night scared too many locals. There are also two 18th-century chest tombs, made from hamstone, one of which commemorates John Northcote, who died in 1738.

== See also ==
- List of ecclesiastical parishes in the Diocese of Bath and Wells
