= Church of St Mary, Wambrook =

Church in Somerset, England

Church of St Mary
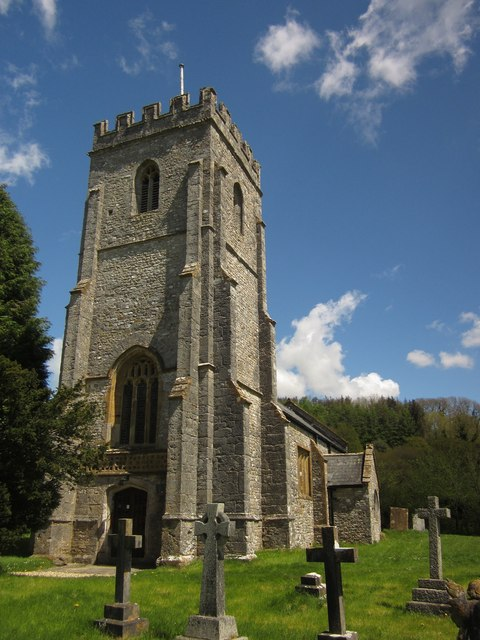

- Location within Somerset
- 50.8645°N 3.0047°W
- Location: Wambrook, Somerset, England

History
- Built: 13th century

Listed Building – Grade II*
- Official name: Church of St Mary
- Designated: 4 February 1958
- Reference no.: 1249439

The Anglican Church of St Mary in Wambrook, Somerset, England, was built in the 13th century. It is a Grade II* listed building.

== History ==
The church was built in the 13th century and has been altered many times since. In the 15th century the nave was rebuilt. Much later, in 1812, most of the chancel was reconstructed. A further Restoration was carried out in 1892. In 1963 the old south porch was transformed into a chapel.

The parish is part of the benefice of Chard St. Mary along with Combe St Nicholas and Wambrook. This benefice is within the Diocese of Bath and Wells. Previously, the parish was part of the Diocese of Salisbury.

== Architecture ==
The stone building has hamstone dressings and a slate roof. It has a three-bay nave and chancel. The three-stage tower is supported by setback buttresses. The tower contains a peal of five bells.

Inside, the church has a 13th-century font. Also, there is a west gallery held up by cast-iron columns.

The churchyard contains a set of 17th-century stocks.

== See also ==
- List of ecclesiastical parishes in the Diocese of Bath and Wells
