= Church of the Holy Cross, Weston Bampfylde =

Church in Somerset, England

Church of the Holy Cross
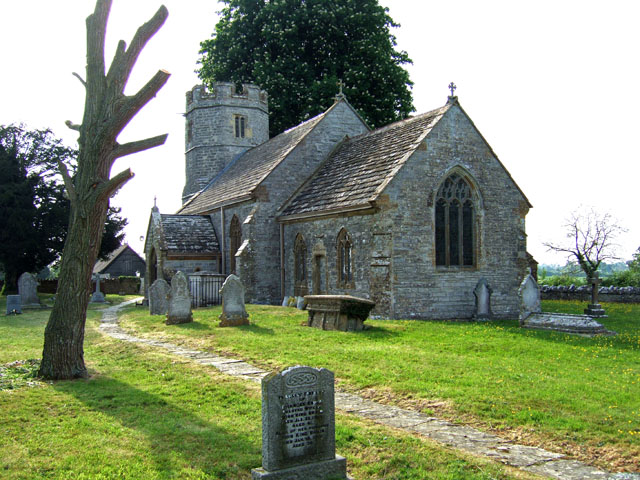

- Location within Somerset
- 51.0225°N 2.5566°W
- Location: Weston Bampfylde, Sparkford, Somerset, England

History
- Built: 13th century

Listed Building – Grade II*
- Official name: Church of the Holy Cross
- Designated: 24 March 1961
- Reference no.: 1243568

The Anglican Church of the Holy Cross in Weston Bampfylde, Sparkford, Somerset, England, was built in the 13th century. It is a Grade II* listed building.

== History ==
The church was built in the 13th century and refurbished in the 15th. A Victorian restoration was carried out in the 19th century.

Following an inspection in 2010 repair work was carried out on the stonework of the tower.

The parish is part of the Cam Vale benefice within the Diocese of Bath and Wells. It became part of the Sparkford Parish in 1933.

== Architecture ==
The stone building has hamstone dressings and slate roofs. It consists of a two-bay chancel and three-bay nave with a vestry and south porch. The four-stage west tower is octagonal in its upper stages.

Inside the church are a 17th-century timber pulpit and 12th century stone font.

== See also ==
- List of ecclesiastical parishes in the Diocese of Bath and Wells
