= Church of St Mary, Compton Pauncefoot =

Church in Somerset, England

Church of St Mary
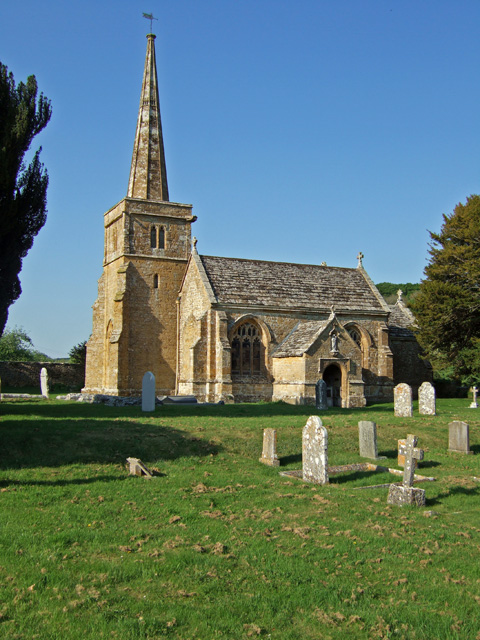

- Location within Somerset
- 51.0337°N 2.5090°W
- Location: Compton Pauncefoot, Somerset, England

History
- Built: 15th century

Listed Building – Grade II*
- Official name: Church of St Mary
- Designated: 24 March 1961
- Reference no.: 1248577

The Anglican Church of St Mary in Compton Pauncefoot, Somerset, England was built in the 15th century. It is a Grade II* listed building.

== History ==
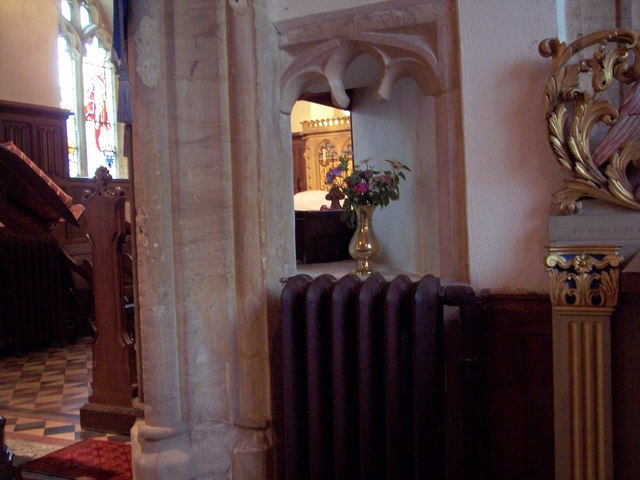
The squint

The church was built in the late 15th century after a bequest from Sir Walter Pauncefoot. It had a Victorian restoration which included the addition of the north aisle in the 19th century.

The parish is part of the Camelot Parishes benefice within the Diocese of Bath and Wells.

== Architecture ==
The stone church has hamstone dressings and stone slate roofs. It consists of a two-bay nave, chancel and north and south aisles. The two-stage west tower is supported by angled corner buttresses and surmounted by an octagonal spire.

Most of the fittings in the church, including the stained glass by Charles Eamer Kempe and Jean-Baptiste Capronnier, are from the 19th century, but it does have memorials dating back to the 16th century. The stained glass windows were repaired by Holywell Glass Ltd.

The lychgate in the churchyard is dedicated as a war memorial to those from the village who died in the two World Wars.
