= Church of St Andrew, Northover =

Church in Somerset, England

Church of St Andrew
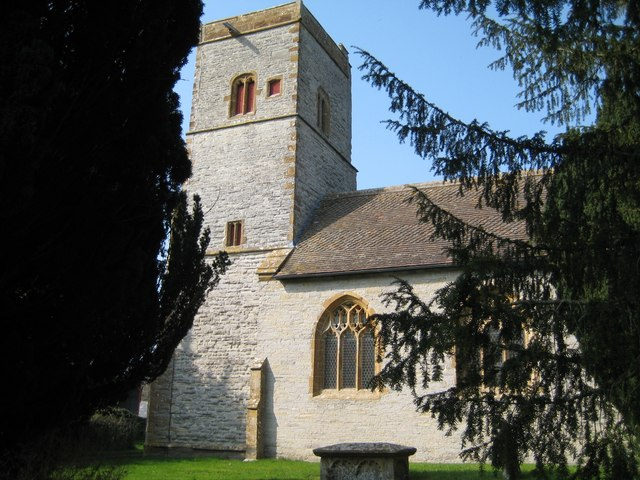

- Location within Somerset
- 51°00′21″N 2°40′50″W
- Location: Northover, Ilchester, Somerset, England

History
- Built: 14th century

Site notes
- Governing body: Churches Conservation Trust

Listed Building – Grade II*
- Official name: Church of St Andrew
- Designated: 19 April 1961
- Reference no.: 1267315

The Anglican Church of St Andrew, Northover, in Ilchester, Somerset, England, dates from the 14th and 15th centuries. Today it is part of the parish of Ilchester with Northover, one of the three parishes which constitute the Ilchester District Churches . It is recorded in the National Heritage List for England as a designated Grade II* listed building, and is a redundant church in the care of the Churches Conservation Trust. It was vested in the Trust on 1 July 1986.

== History ==
The church was built in the 14th century. The nave and chancel were rebuilt in 1821 and the building was restored in 1878 by Charles Benson.

The church stands close to the River Yeo and on the site of an earlier Roman building and associated cemetery next to the Fosse Way. It was also the site of as minster church in the Saxon era, when it was held by Glastonbury Abbey. After the Norman Conquest it was held by Maurice, Bishop of London, until was appropriated by St. John's hospital, Bridgwater, in 1219.

== Architecture ==
The stone building has hamstone dressing and a clay tiled roof. It has a three-bay nave and two-bay chancel with an organ chamber and vestry. The three-stage tower is supported by corner buttresses and has an octagonal stair turret.

== See also ==
- List of churches preserved by the Churches Conservation Trust in Southwest England
