= Church of St Roch, Pendomer =

Church in Somerset, England

Church of St Roch
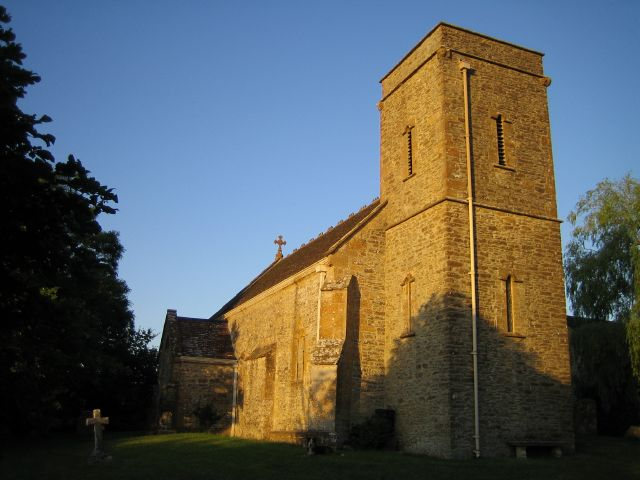

- Location within Somerset
- 50.8910°N 2.6819°W
- Location: Pendomer, Closworth, Somerset, England

History
- Built: 14th century

Listed Building – Grade II*
- Official name: Church of St Roch
- Designated: 19 April 1961
- Reference no.: 1307971

The Anglican Church of St Roch at Pendomer in Closworth, Somerset, England was built in the 14th century. It is a Grade II* listed building.

== History ==
The church, dedicated to Saint Roch, was built in the 14th century, although 1297 has been suggested. It was modified in the 15th.

The parish is part of the Coker Ridge benefice within the Diocese of Bath and Wells.

== Architecture ==
The stone building has hamstone dressings and clay tile roofs. It has a single-cell plan with a two-stage west tower with a parapet.

The interior includes a memorial dating from 1328 and an effigy of a knight believed to be John de Domer. There are remains of 15th century stained glass in some of the windows.

== See also ==
- List of ecclesiastical parishes in the Diocese of Bath and Wells
