= Sparkford =

Village in Somerset, England

Coordinates: 51.0355°N 2.5655°W

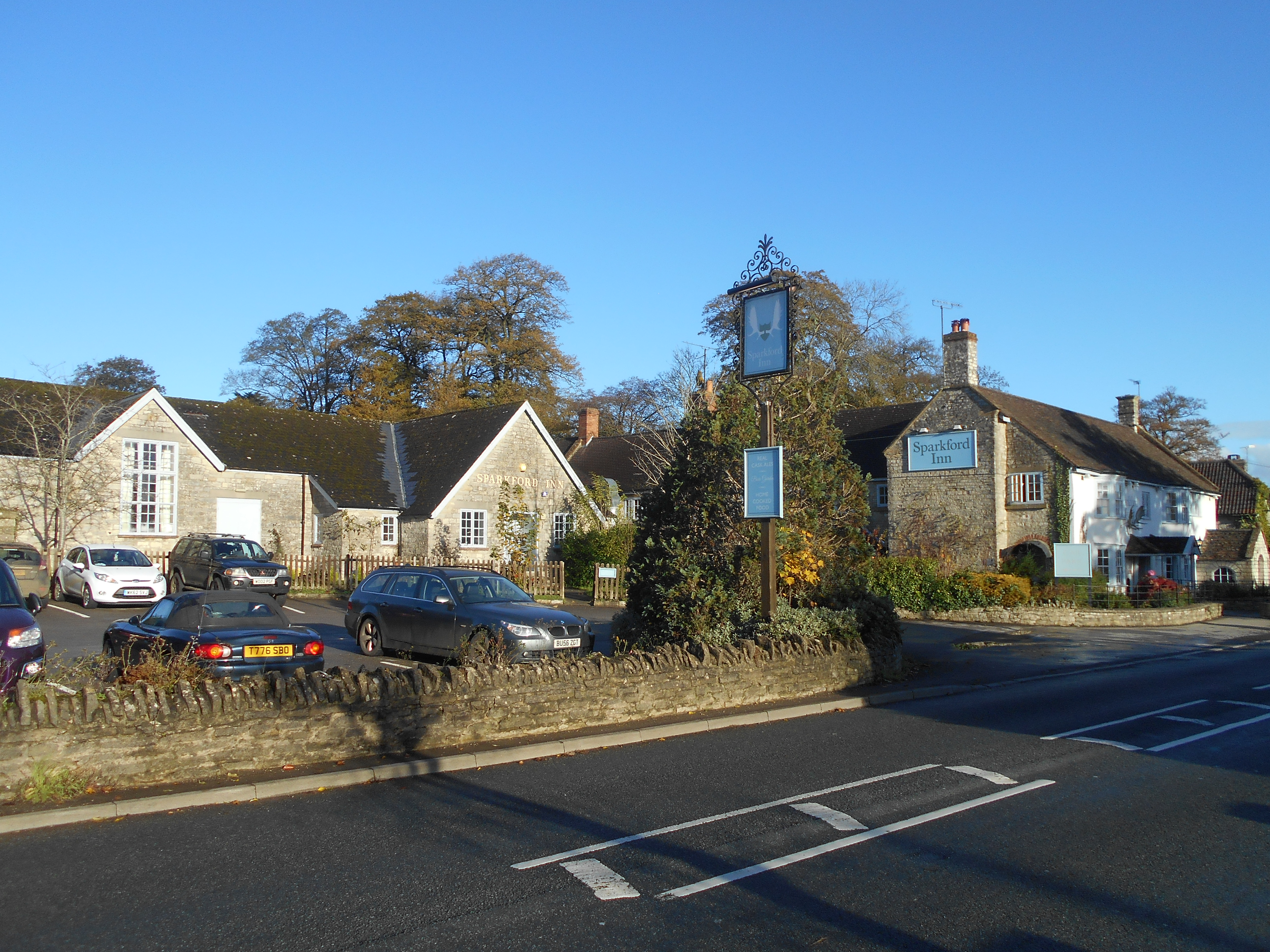
- The Sparkford Inn

- Location within Somerset
- Population: 617 (2011)
- OS grid reference: ST604264
- Civil parish: Sparkford
- Unitary authority: Somerset
- Ceremonial county: Somerset
- Region: South West
- Country: England
- Sovereign state: United Kingdom
- Post town: YEOVIL
- Postcode district: BA22
- Dialling code: 01963
- Police: Avon and Somerset
- Fire: Devon and Somerset
- Ambulance: South Western
- UK Parliament: Glastonbury and Somerton
- Website: Sparkford Parish Council

Sparkford is a village and civil parish in Somerset, England. The parish includes the village of Weston Bampfylde.

It is situated near the junction of the A303 from London to Exeter and the A359 from Frome to Yeovil. In 1986 a bypass was built to take the main traffic on the A303 around the north of the village. The population is 617 mostly living along the old A303 and Church Road, which runs down to the former water mill and the church.

== History ==
There is evidence for continuous occupation from Roman to Saxon times. The village is listed in the Domesday Book for Somerset as Spercheforde. It was held in 1086 by Fulwin from Walter de Douai having been held by Alwakin before the Norman Conquest.

The parish was part of the hundred of Catsash.

In about 1335 the manor was held by Nicholas de Hanyton, while by 1370 it was held by John Lovel of Titchmarsh. The next known owner is Sir Thomas Essex who held the manor in about 1554. Richard Newman acquired Sparkford manor in 1610 and this family held it until 1792. It then passed to the Bennett family of North Cadbury.

The village appears formerly to have been situated south of the church, rather than to the north of it as at present. There are still signs of earthworks in the field that used to be called Lickhill. Some archaeological investigations have recently been carried out but the results are not yet known.

== Governance ==
Sparkford is part of Castle Cary electoral division, which elects two councillors to Somerset Council. It also has a parish council which has responsibility for some local issues.

The village was part of Wincanton Rural District 1894 to 1974, and South Somerset from 1974 to 2023, for which it was part of the Camelot electoral ward.

It is also part of the Glastonbury and Somerton constituency represented in the House of Commons of the Parliament of the United Kingdom.

== Transport ==
=== Roads ===
The present main roads have been important for many years. The bridge was widened in 1815. The toll house for the turnpike to Wincanton still exists but is now a private house (The Octagon). The Sparkford Inn, dating from the 15th century, was an important coaching house and continues to be a popular hostelry. It used to be a meeting place for the local hunt but this is now combined with the Blackmore Vale one.

Public transport provision is sparse; South West Coaches operates routes 1 and 1B through Sparkford, eight times a day towards Yeovil and six times a day towards Shepton Mallet, except on Sundays.

=== Railway ===
When the railway was built through Sparkford in 1877, there was a rearrangement of the roads, but the lines of the old ones can still be seen. The track was part of the Wilts, Somerset and Weymouth Railway (later Great Western Railway) and ran from Thingley Junction in Wiltshire to Weymouth. There was a station, which served a wide district, and later a siding for milk trains for the milk factory, but both are now decommissioned. However, the track is still in use.

== Milk factory ==
Sparkford Vale Cooperative Dairy Society had a factory by the railway from 1918 until 1938. Water for its use was taken from the River Cam. This factory was taken over by the Haynes Publishing Company (renowned for its car manuals) in the 1960s and has since greatly expanded.

== Schools ==
The village school was erected in 1849 and enlarged in 1892. It was for 80 children with an average attendance of 61, with a master and mistress. It is now closed and has become the village hall. The village's primary age children now generally go to Countess Gytha Primary School in Queen Camel.

Just to the north of Sparkford is Hazlegrove Preparatory School, which is an independent preparatory school for King's School, Bruton. In early 2011 the village hall once more became utilised for the purpose of a local playgroup. The Galhampton Pre-school re-located to Sparkford due to structural problems with Galhampton village hall. After a few years being located at Sparkford in Sept 2016 the Galhampton Pre-school closed its doors due to dwindling numbers applying to the Pre-school. It has now joined to the North Cadbury Primary School.

== Church ==
The Church of St Mary Magdalene is still as described in 1868, but the parish is now part of a Benefice known as Cam Vale which includes Queen Camel, West Camel, Corton Denham, Weston Bampfield and Sutton Montis. The building dates from the 14th century with the nave built in 1824 by Thomas Ellis of local grey lias stone cut and squared, with Hamstone dressings. The first known incumbent of the church was in 1297 and the monumental inscriptions date back to Johes Clyke, who died in 1513. It has been designated by English Heritage as a grade II* listed building.

The former rectory, which was used by the Navy in World War II and then used as an egg packing station, is now used for private housing. The former glebe land was also sold off for housing.

The Church of the Holy Cross in Weston Bampfylde was built in the 13th century.

The graveyard is also the burial site of the noted author and spiritual teacher J.G. Bennett (1897-1974) whose family were prominent in Sparkford in the 19th and earlier 20th centuries.

== Amenities ==
Sparkford has a cricket field by the old A303 with a successful local team. There is a playing field for children off Church Road, run by a trust. Another trust looks after Sparkford Hill copse to the west of the village.

Sparkford Wood, to the north of the village, is privately owned and is a site of special scientific interest. It is generally opened to the public for charity at bluebell time.

== Motor museum ==
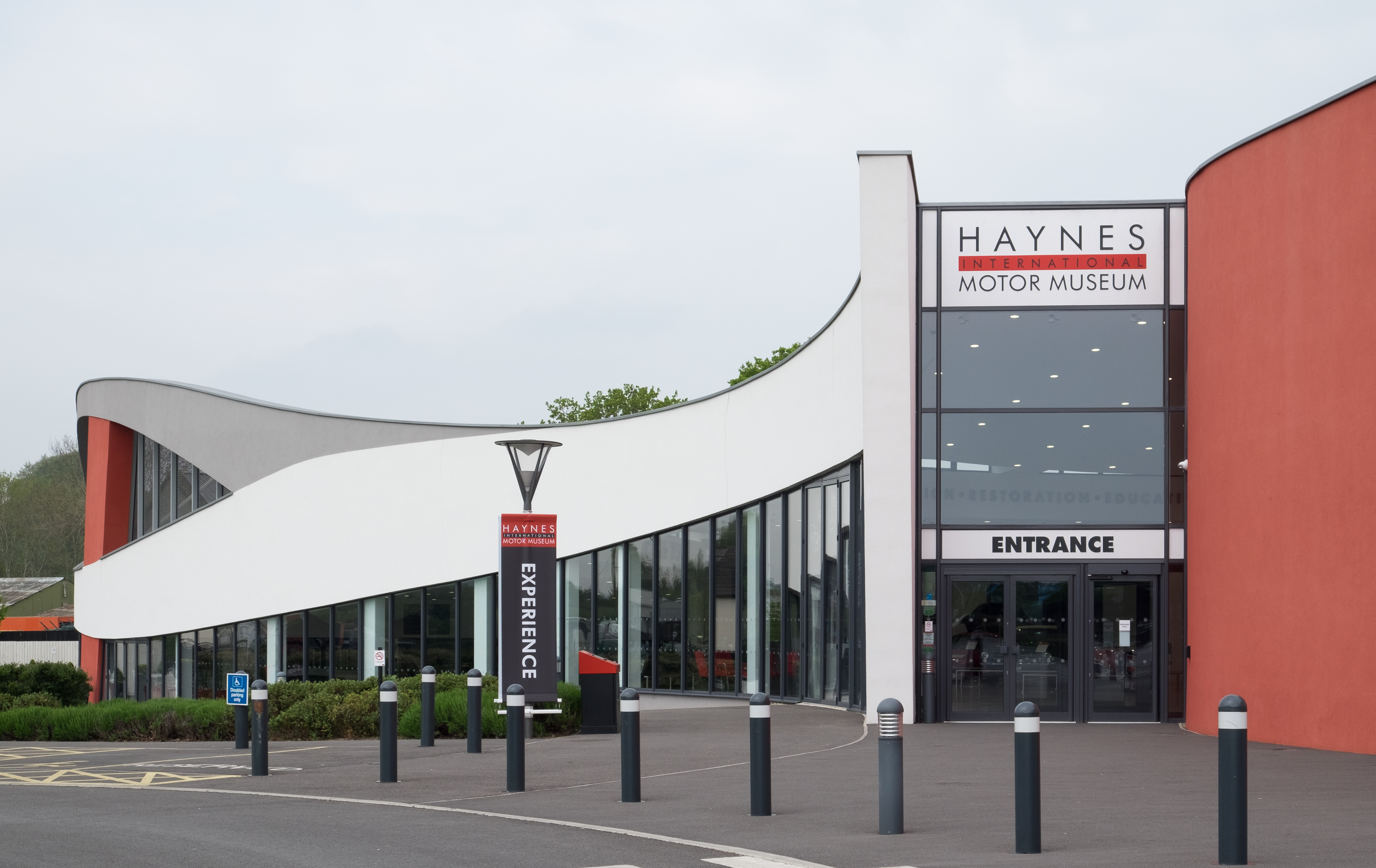
Haynes International Motor Museum

The Haynes International Motor Museum has over 340 cars and bikes and is continually growing. It is often used as a start/finish point for car and motorbike rallies.

== Local businesses ==
Sparkford is still a centre for milk distribution. There is a well known sawmill which makes sheds and many other things. There is a caravan and camping park, Long Hazel Park, which is a convenient base to visit Somerset, as well as being a place from which to explore local attractions such as Cadbury Castle, and the Fleet Air Arm Museum, and nearby towns including Castle Cary and Bruton. Long Hazel Park was established on the same ground as the Sparkford Vale Co-Operative Dairy immediately after WW2 and used as urgent post-war housing.

At one time Sparkford had three garages, but one has since been demolished after the bypass was built. Wakes Garage was the centre for a bus company for many years.

== Local organisations ==
3rd Sparkford Scout Group (Beavers, Cubs, Scouts and Young Explorers) meet in the Village Hall weekly during term time and are involved in local Parish events such as the Remembrance Sunday Parade. There is also a thriving young farmers' club.

== See also ==
- Queen Camel
- South Cadbury
- Yeovilton
