= Church of St Michael, Seavington St Michael =

Church in Somerset, England

Church of St Michael
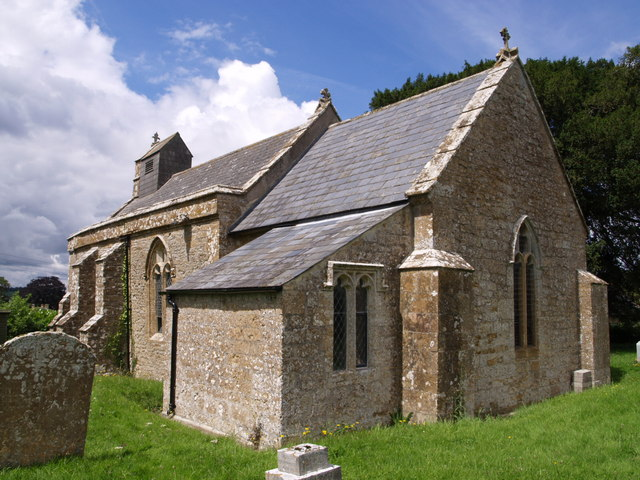

- Location within Somerset
- 50.9309°N 2.8407°W
- Location: Seavington St Michael, Somerset, England

History
- Built: 12th century

Listed Building – Grade II*
- Official name: Church of St Michael
- Designated: 4 February 1958
- Reference no.: 1057002

The Anglican Church of St Michael in Seavington St Michael, Somerset, England was built in the 12th century. It is a Grade II* listed building.

== History ==
The church was built in the late 12th century. It was altered in the 15th century, including a new rood screen and windows, and again in the 19th century when a gallery was added and the vestry added.

The church is part of a benefice with the Church of St Peter and St Paul, South Petherton, within the Diocese of Bath and Wells.

== Architecture ==
The hamstone building has slate roofs with a bell turret at the western end. It has a three-bay nave and single-bay chancel which are supported by buttresses.

Most of the interior fittings are from the Victorian restoration, but it does have a font from the 12th or 13th century and some fragments of medieval stained glass.

On the south wall of the nave is a memorial plaque commemorating the men from the village who died in World War I.

== See also ==
- List of ecclesiastical parishes in the Diocese of Bath and Wells
