= Barton St David =

Village and civil parish in Somerset, England

Coordinates: 51.084°N 2.657°W

- Village
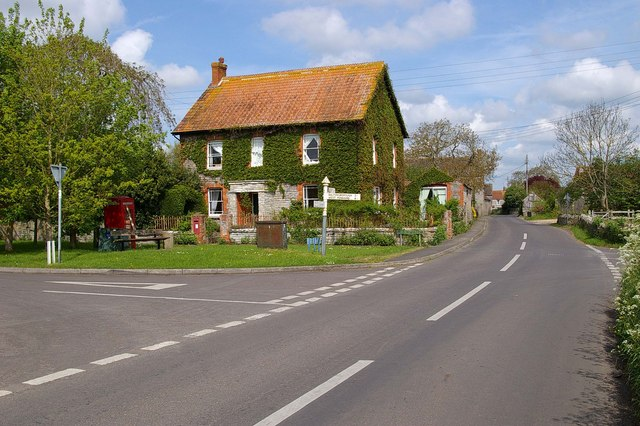
- Junction of High Lane, Church St, and Mill Lane in the centre of Barton St David. With the old Post Office Limited branch and red telephone box visible in the background.

- Location within Somerset
- Population: 609 (2021)
- OS grid reference: ST541318
- Civil parish: Barton St David
- Unitary authority: Somerset Council
- Ceremonial county: Somerset
- Region: South West
- Country: England
- Sovereign state: United Kingdom
- Post town: SOMERTON
- Postcode district: TA11
- Dialling code: 01458
- Police: Avon and Somerset
- Fire: Devon and Somerset
- Ambulance: South Western
- UK Parliament: Glastonbury and Somerton

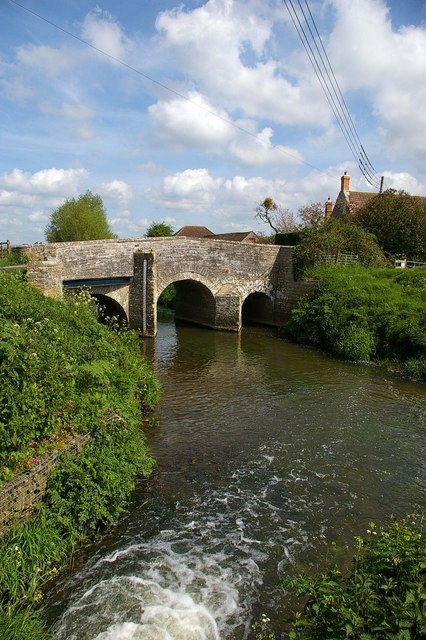
Tootal Bridge over the River Brue

Barton St David, commonly referred to as Barton, is a village and civil parish on the River Brue adjacent to Keinton Mandeville at the foot of Combe Hill in Somerset, England. It is situated 5 miles (8 km) south-east of Glastonbury and 5 miles (8 km) north-east of Somerton. The village has a population of 609.

== History ==
The parish was part of the hundred of Catsash.

== Governance ==
The parish council has responsibility for local issues, including setting an annual precept (local rate) to cover the council's operating costs and producing annual accounts for public scrutiny. The parish council evaluates local planning applications and works with the local police, district council officers, and neighbourhood watch groups on matters of crime, security, and traffic. The parish council's role also includes initiating projects for the maintenance and repair of parish facilities, as well as consulting with the district council on the maintenance, repair, and improvement of highways, drainage, footpaths, public transport, and street cleaning. Conservation matters (including trees and listed buildings) and environmental issues are also the responsibility of the council.

For local government purposes, since 1 April 2023, the village comes under the unitary authority of Somerset Council. Prior to this, it was part of the non-metropolitan district of South Somerset, which was formed on 1 April 1974 under the Local Government Act 1972, having previously been part of Langport Rural District.

It is also part of the Glastonbury and Somerton constituency represented in the House of Commons of the Parliament of the United Kingdom. It elects one Member of Parliament (MP) by the first past the post system of election.

== Church ==
The Church of St David has 12th-century origins. The tower, which is octagonal, is in three stages and probably dates from the 15th century. It has been designated by English Heritage as a Grade II* listed building.

== Notable inhabitants ==
Barton St David was the birthplace of Henry Adams (1583–1646), who, after their marriage in nearby Charlton Mackrell, emigrated with his wife Edith and nine children to the new colonies in Massachusetts. He was the great-great-grandfather of John Adams, the first Vice President and second President of the United States. He was also the great-great-great-grandfather of John Quincy Adams, the sixth President of the United States. There is a plaque in the parish church which commemorates this link between the village and the United States.
