= Church of Saint John the Baptist, South Brewham =

Church in Somerset, England

Church of Saint John the Baptist
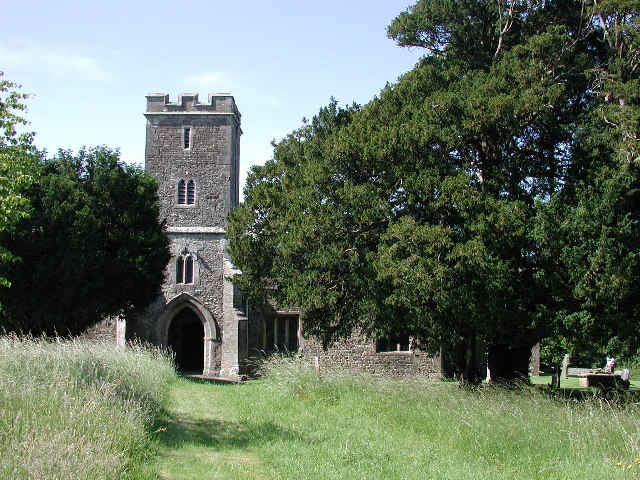
- Tower of St John's Church, South Brewham

- Location within Somerset
- 51°07′26″N 2°24′07″W
- Location: South Brewham, Somerset, England

Listed Building – Grade II*
- Designated: 24 March 1961
- Reference no.: 1056463

The Anglican Church of Saint John the Baptist in South Brewham, within the English county of Somerset, has 13th-century origins, but the current building is largely from the late 19th century. It is a Grade II* listed building.

The church has a 5-bay nave, 4-bay north aisle and 2-bay chancel. The oldest surviving part of the church is the two-stage southwest tower and the arch beneath it, which were built in the 13th century. There are two fonts, one from the 14th century and the other from the 19th.

The cross in the churchyard, 15 yards southeast of the church door, has a rectangular base supporting an octagonal shaft from which the head is missing. It is a scheduled monument. Part of the surrounding churchyard is managed as a wildlife site under the Living Churchyard project.

The parish is part of the Bruton and District Team Ministry within the archdeaconry of Wells.

== See also ==
- List of ecclesiastical parishes in the Diocese of Bath and Wells
