= Wambrook =

Village and civil parish in Somerset, England

Coordinates: 50.8626°N 3.0031°W

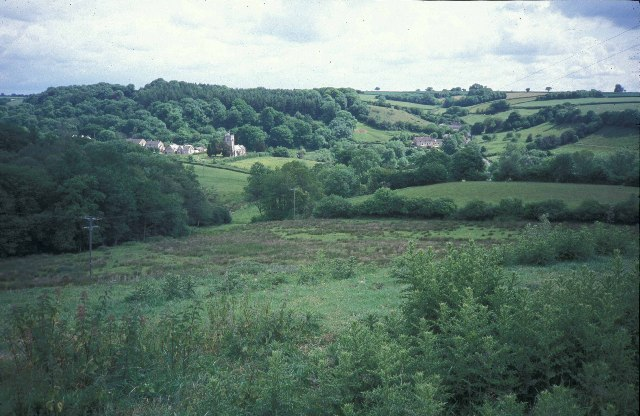
- Wambrook, seen from the west

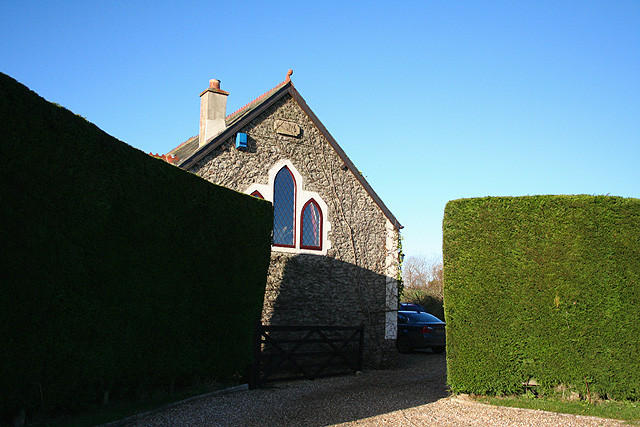
- Methodist Chapel

- Location within Somerset
- Population: 184 (2011)
- OS grid reference: ST295075
- Civil parish: Wambrook
- Unitary authority: Somerset Council
- Ceremonial county: Somerset
- Region: South West
- Country: England
- Sovereign state: United Kingdom
- Post town: CHARD
- Postcode district: TA20
- Dialling code: 01460
- Police: Avon and Somerset
- Fire: Devon and Somerset
- Ambulance: South Western
- UK Parliament: Yeovil

Wambrook is a village and civil parish in the Blackdown Hills, Somerset, England. The village lies about 2 miles (3 km) southwest of the town of Chard. The parish includes the hamlets of Higher Wambrook and Lower Wambrook which is sometimes known as Haselcombe.

Ferne Animal Sanctuary is in the west of the parish.

== History ==
In the west of the parish at Wortheal there are substantial earthworks which may date from the Iron Age.

Until 1895 Wambrook was part of the Beaminster Forum and Redhone Hundred in Dorset, only after that becoming part of Somerset.

=== Notable people ===
- Samuel Vickery, recipient of the Victoria Cross

== Governance ==
The parish council has responsibility for local issues, including setting an annual precept (local rate) to cover the council's operating costs and producing annual accounts for public scrutiny.

For local government purposes, since 1 April 2023, the parish comes under the unitary authority of Somerset Council. Prior to this, it was part of the non-metropolitan district of South Somerset (established under the Local Government Act 1972). It was part of Chard Rural District before 1974.

It is also part of the Yeovil county constituency represented in the House of Commons of the Parliament of the United Kingdom. It elects one Member of Parliament (MP) by the first past the post system of election.

== Religious sites ==
The Church of St Mary dates from the 13th century and has been designated by English Heritage as a Grade II* listed building. In the churchyard are a 17th-century set of stocks.
