= Charlton Musgrove =

Village and civil parish in Somerset, England

Coordinates: 51.0821°N 2.3939°W

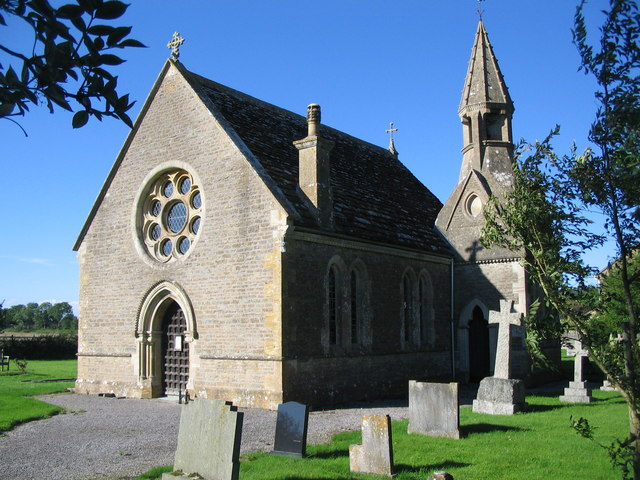
- St Johns

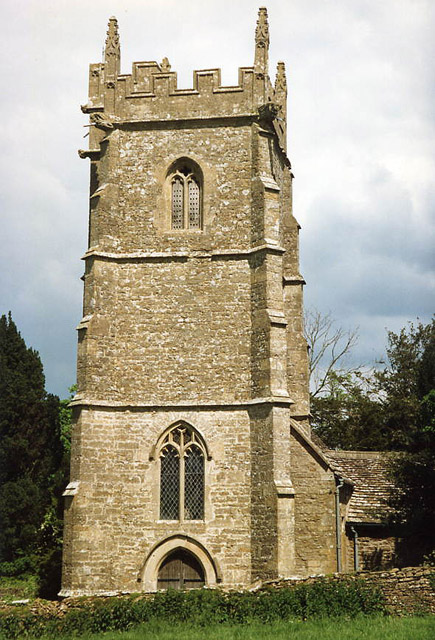
- St Stephen

- Location within Somerset
- Population: 398 (2011)
- OS grid reference: ST725315
- Unitary authority: Somerset Council
- Ceremonial county: Somerset
- Region: South West
- Country: England
- Sovereign state: United Kingdom
- Post town: WINCANTON
- Postcode district: BA9
- Dialling code: 01963
- Police: Avon and Somerset
- Fire: Devon and Somerset
- Ambulance: South Western
- UK Parliament: Glastonbury and Somerton

Charlton Musgrove is a village and civil parish in Somerset, England, situated 1 mile (1.6 km) north east of Wincanton. The village has a population of 398. The parish includes the hamlets of Barrow, Holbrook, Southmarsh, and part of Shalford.

== History ==
In 1066 the holder of the manor was Godman but passed to Robert FitzGerold by the time of the Domesday Book in 1086. The parish of Charlton Musgrove was part of the Norton Ferris Hundred.

In 1861 the Dorset Central Railway opened a standard gauge track through the western side of the parish, joining Templecombe with Cole. It was linked to Glastonbury in the following year by the Somerset and Dorset Railway and was double lined in 1887. The line was closed in 1966.

== Governance ==
The parish council has responsibility for local issues, including setting an annual precept (local rate) to cover the council's operating costs and producing annual accounts for public scrutiny. The parish council evaluates local planning applications and works with the local police, district council officers, and neighbourhood watch groups on matters of crime, security, and traffic. The parish council's role also includes initiating projects for the maintenance and repair of parish facilities, as well as consulting with the district council on the maintenance, repair, and improvement of highways, drainage, footpaths, public transport, and street cleaning. Conservation matters (including trees and listed buildings) and environmental issues are also the responsibility of the council.

For local government purposes, since 1 April 2023, the parish comes under the unitary authority of Somerset Council. Prior to this, it was part of the non-metropolitan district of South Somerset (established under the Local Government Act 1972). It was part of Wincanton Rural District before 1974.

It is also part of the Glastonbury and Somerton county constituency represented in the House of Commons of the Parliament of the United Kingdom. It elects one Member of Parliament (MP) by the first past the post system of election.

== Religious sites ==
The village is unusual in having two churches and two centres. The older Church of St Stephen dates from the 13th century. It has been designated as a Grade II* listed building. The second centre is said to have originated when people fled to avoid the plague. The newer centre had no church until 1877 when a chapel of ease at Barrow Lane, dedicated to St John the Baptist, was given by Mrs. Emma Frances Davies (née Leir), the widow of a former rector, daughter of Rev William Leir (1768–1863). It is of stone in a 13th-century style, designed by Charles Edward Davis of Bath, and comprises an apsidal chancel and a nave with a southern bell tower. The Leir family themselves have provided a number of rectors to the parish.

Stavordale Priory, now a private home owned by Sir Cameron Mackintosh, is thought to be linked to the village's Old Church near the altar by a tunnel, perhaps used as a priest's escape route, some two miles in length. The building has 13th-century origins, having been founded by a member of the Lovel family, and was converted around the time of the dissolution of the monasteries, after the Priory merged with Taunton in 1533. The Priory of the Augustinian Order was first mentioned in 1243. The bell tower is known to have existed by 1374, and the church was refitted and rebuilt around 1439. The chantry of Jesus was described as having been "recently completed" in 1526.

== Notable people ==
William Arnold an important master mason who flourished between 1595 and 1637 lived in the village in 1595 where he was church warden. His first known commission was for the design of Montacute House around 1598.
