= Church of St Stephen, Winsham =

Church in Somerset, England

Church of St Stephen
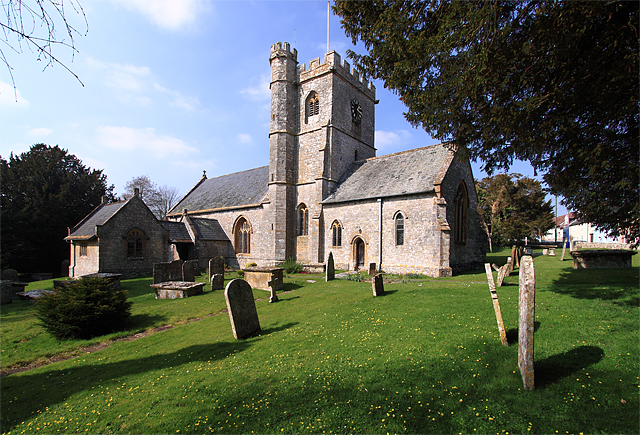

- Location within Somerset
- 50.8526°N 2.8898°W
- Location: Winsham, Somerset, England

History
- Built: 13th century

Listed Building – Grade II*
- Official name: Church of St Stephen
- Designated: 4 February 1958
- Reference no.: 1177765

The Anglican Church of St Stephen in Winsham, Somerset, England, was built in the 13th century. It is a Grade II* listed building.

== History ==
The church was built in the 13th century. from which some of the lancet windows remain, and largely rebuilt in the 15th. It underwent Victorian restoration in the 19th century and a vestry added in the 1920s.

Until July 2018, because of the poor condition of the roofs, particularly of the tower, the church had been placed on the Heritage at Risk Register.

On 29 July 2018 the Bishop of Bath and Wells, Peter Hancock, held a dedication service (with Eucharist) in the Church to celebrate the completion of the repair works to the Tower and roof.

The church is also noted for it has a surviving copy of Foxe's Book of Martyrs on display, and renowned for having only one of two surviving pre-Reformation tympana (rood screens) of the Crucifixion anywhere in the world (the other being the church of St Catherine, Ludham, Norfolk).

The parish is part of the Two Shires benefice within the Diocese of Bath and Wells. The church continues to host worship services.

== Architecture ==
The stone building has slate roofs. It consists of a two-bay nave and chancel supported by buttresses. The central three-stage tower has an octagonal stair turret and gargoyles on the exterior. The tower holds a peal of eight bells, the oldest of which was cast in 1583.

The interior includes a Jacobean pulpit, 15th century timber screen and a reredos added in 1873 by Harry Hems. The octagonal font is from the 15th century as are the painted tympanum boards depicting the crucifixion.

== See also ==
- List of ecclesiastical parishes in the Diocese of Bath and Wells
- Winsham Parish - St Stephen's
