= Church of St Stephen, Charlton Musgrove =

Church in Somerset, England

Church of St Stephen
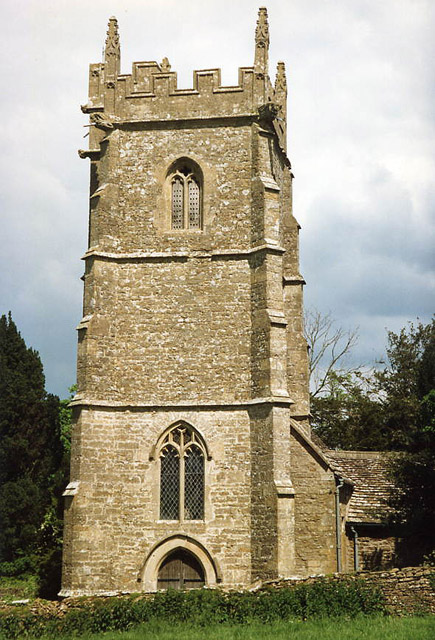

- Location within Somerset
- 51°04′04″N 2°24′03″W
- Location: Charlton Musgrove, Somerset, England

History
- Built: 13th century

Listed Building – Grade II*
- Official name: Church of St Stephen
- Designated: 24 March 1961
- Reference no.: 1346185

The Anglican Church of St Stephen in Charlton Musgrove in the English county of Somerset was built in the 13th century. It is a Grade II* listed building.

The church was associated with Bruton Priory in the 12th century. Members of the Leir family have been rectors from 1661 until 1976. The Victorian restoration in 1884 caused conflict as the rector Charles Edward Lier has not obtained the relevant permissions from the bishop.

The stone building has slate roofs. It consists of a three bay nave and two bay chancel with a three-stage west tower which houses three bells and is decorated with hunky punks and gargoyles. Inside the church are an octagonal font dating from the 17th century and a hatchment from 1660.

The parish is part of the benefice of Charlton Musgrove, Cucklington and Stoke Trister within the Diocese of Bath and Wells.

== See also ==
- List of ecclesiastical parishes in the Diocese of Bath and Wells
