= Church of St James, East Lambrook =

Church in Somerset, England

Church of St James
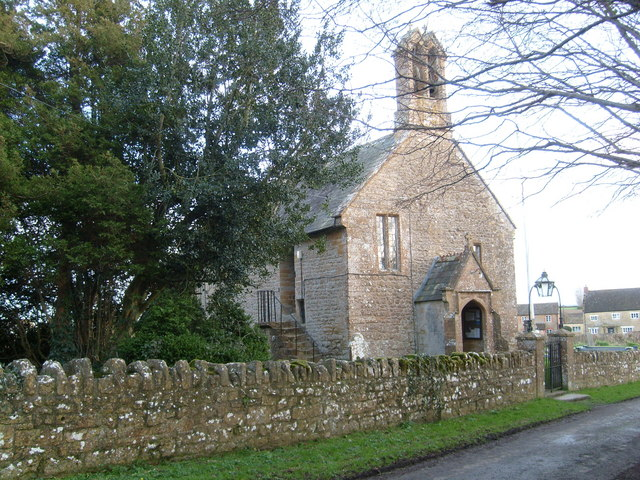

- Location within Somerset
- 50.9646°N 2.8106°W
- Location: East Lambrook, Kingsbury Episcopi, Somerset, England

History
- Built: 12th century

Listed Building – Grade II*
- Official name: Church of St James
- Designated: 17 April 1959
- Reference no.: 1056883

The Anglican Church of St James in East Lambrook, Kingsbury Episcopi, Somerset, England was built in the 12th century. It is a Grade II* listed building.

== History ==
The church was built in the 12th century and has been changed and restored several times including a Victorian restoration in the 19th century.

The parish is part of the benefice of South Petherton with the Seavingtons and the Lambrooks within the Diocese of Bath and Wells.

== Architecture ==
The stone building has slate roofs with a small bell turret. It has a three-bay nave with a 19th-century porch. The chancel arch has been dated to 1190. The west gallery which is supported on cast iron columns.

The fittings include a Jacobean pulpit and an octagonal font. It still has box pews.

== See also ==
- List of ecclesiastical parishes in the Diocese of Bath and Wells
