= Seavington St Michael =

Village and civil parish in Somerset, England

Coordinates: 50.9328°N 2.8449°W

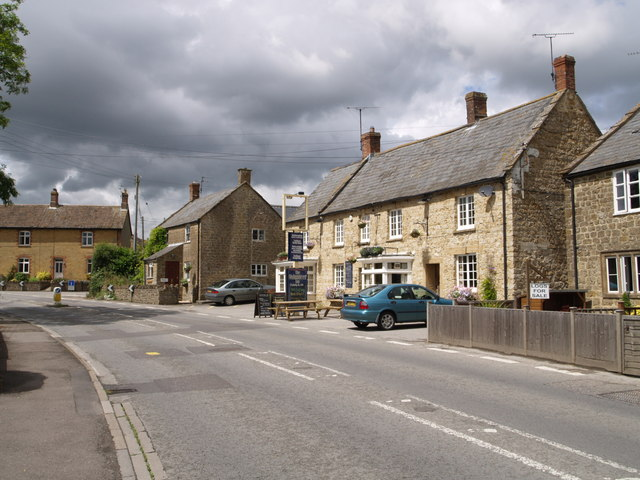
- Volunteer Inn, Seavington St. Michael

- Location within Somerset
- Population: 127 (2011)
- OS grid reference: ST407151
- Unitary authority: Somerset Council
- Ceremonial county: Somerset
- Region: South West
- Country: England
- Sovereign state: United Kingdom
- Post town: ILMINSTER
- Postcode district: TA19
- Dialling code: 01460
- Police: Avon and Somerset
- Fire: Devon and Somerset
- Ambulance: South Western
- UK Parliament: Yeovil

Seavington St Michael is a village and civil parish in Somerset, England. It is situated next to the village of Seavington St Mary, about 3 miles (4.8 km) east of Ilminster. It lies in a hollow within a larger area of low-lying hills and valleys running broadly east-west. A part of the South Petherton Hundred, originally the area included seven settlements (seven tons) which have gradually merged or vanished, but were the origin of the "Seavington" part of the village name.

== History ==
The manor was held by Siward the falconer at the time of the Domesday Book in 1086. By 1252 Adam the Dane then became known as Seavington Dennis. From 1483 to 1539 it was held by Glastonbury Abbey and after the dissolution of the monasteries he passed it to Winchester College, who held it until 1932.

Seavington St Michael—the smaller of the two villages with 57 dwellings and 125 inhabitants—appears to have become the more important since the motor car forced the building of New Road to straighten the London to Exeter route early in the 20th century, thus by-passing Seavington St Mary. Since then, in 1988 the new Ilminster by-pass has eliminated much traffic, although the road through Seavington St Michael is still a major access route to the market town of Ilminster.

== Governance ==
The parish council has responsibility for local issues, including setting an annual precept (local rate) to cover the council's operating costs and producing annual accounts for public scrutiny. It evaluates local planning applications and works with the local police, district council officers, and neighbourhood watch groups on matters of crime, security, and traffic. It also has responsibility for initiating projects for the maintenance and repair of parish facilities, as well as consulting with the district council on the maintenance, repair, and improvement of highways, drainage, footpaths, public transport, and street cleaning. Conservation matters (including trees and listed buildings) and environmental issues are also the responsibility of the council.

For local government purposes, since 1 April 2023, the parish comes under the unitary authority of Somerset Council. Prior to this, it was part of the non-metropolitan district of South Somerset (established under the Local Government Act 1972). It was part of Chard Rural District before 1974.

It is also part of the Yeovil county constituency represented in the House of Commons of the Parliament of the United Kingdom. It elects one Member of Parliament (MP) by the first past the post system of election.

== Religious sites ==
The Anglican parish Church of St Michael dates from the late 12th century. It was given a porch around 1291, further alterations in the 15th century and a gallery was added around 1800. It has been designated as a Grade II* listed building.
