= Hamstone =

Building stone from Somerset

Hamstone wall from Tithe Barn, Haselbury Mill, Haselbury, Somerset, England

Hamstone is a honey-coloured building stone from Ham Hill, Somerset, England. It is a well-cemented medium to coarse grained limestone characterised by marked bedding planes of clay inclusions and less well-cemented material which weather differentially to give exposed blocks a characteristic furrowed appearance. In origin, Hamstone is a Jurassic limestone from the Toarcian, or Upper Lias, stage.

== History ==
In the 19th century there were 24 small quarries operating on Ham Hill employing some 200 men. In later Victorian times industrial quarrying expanded significantly, with upwards of 200 small family-run quarries and masonry businesses operating on site.

== Modern quarrying ==
Today hamstone is quarried in only two areas of Ham Hill. The North quarry, run by Ham & Doulting Stone, extracts stone from just beneath the surface and is the longest running hamstone quarry in existence. The Norton or South quarry, run by Harvey Stone, extracts its stone from some 20–30 metres below the surface. This quarry was formed by the re-opening of workings that were abandoned in the 1930s. Hamstone House was built with the last significant supply of hamstone from the quarries before their closure. Both quarries are owned by the Duchy of Cornwall.

A study by South Somerset District Council’s Area Conservation Officer noted that the stone of the South quarry is yellower in colour, less hard and less durable than the greyer North quarry hamstone. North quarry stone is primarily used by local stonemasons for the repair of external features in historic buildings, such as mullion windows and ashlars stonework as well as for new developments in conservation areas.

== Style and usage ==
Described by Simon Jenkins as "the loveliest building material in England", hamstone is soft enough to be cut to make decorative features such as doorway arches and bell openings in church towers such as at the Church of St Mary at Chedzoy, Somerset. The attractive colour also contributes to its being chosen by masons and architects for more than 1000 years for adorning the buildings in the countryside of surrounding Somerset. Hamstone is featured in the medieval church towers throughout the county, and the town of South Petherton is built largely of the material.

Besides being used for building, hamstone was also burnt locally in small kilns for the manufacture of lime, predominantly for use as fertiliser. Some was used for the manufacture of builders' mortar and limewash render, but the results were of poor quality due to the iron content of the stone. At least two of the lime kilns still exist: one close to the abandoned medieval hamlet of Witcombe, and another close to Norton Quarry.
