= Grade I listed buildings in South Somerset =

South Somerset shown within Somerset and England

South Somerset is a former local government district in the English county of Somerset. The South Somerset district occupies an area of 370 square miles (958 km^{2}), stretching from its borders with Devon and Dorset to the edge of the Somerset Levels. The district had a population of about 158,000, and Yeovil was its administrative centre.

In the United Kingdom, the term listed building refers to a building or other structure officially designated as being of special architectural, historical or cultural significance; Grade I structures are those considered to be "buildings of exceptional interest". Listing was begun by a provision in the Town and Country Planning Act 1947. Once listed, severe restrictions are imposed on the modifications allowed to a building's structure or its fittings. In England, the authority for listing under the Planning (Listed Buildings and Conservation Areas) Act 1990 rests with Historic England, a non-departmental public body sponsored by the Department for Digital, Culture, Media and Sport; local authorities have a responsibility to regulate and enforce the planning regulations.

There are 94 Grade I listed buildings in South Somerset. Most are Norman- or medieval-era churches, many of which are included in the Somerset towers—a collection of distinctive, mostly spireless Gothic church towers—but there are other religious buildings as well. Muchelney Abbey consists of the remains and foundations of a medieval Benedictine Abbey and an early Tudor house dating from the 16th century, formerly the lodgings of the resident abbot. Stavordale Priory was built as a priory church in the 13th century and was converted into a private residence in 1533. The Hamstone Stoke sub Hamdon Priory is a 14th-century former priest's house of the chantry chapel of St Nicholas, which after 1518 become a farm known as Parsonage Farmhouse. It remained a farm until about 1960, and has been owned by the National Trust since 1946.

Since the Reformation the 13th century Hanging Chapel in Langport has been a town hall, courthouse, grammar school, museum, and armoury before becoming a masonic hall in 1891. The house known as The Abbey in Charlton Mackrell takes its name from the site on which it was built, the Chantry Chapel of the Holy Spirit, founded in 1237. Naish Priory, built around 1400 in East Coker, was never a priory, and similarly the Abbey Farm House and Abbey Barn in Yeovil which date from around 1420, have always been in lay-ownership; "abbey" was added to their names in the 19th century. The 140-foot (43 m) Burton Pynsent Monument was designed in 1757, by Lancelot "Capability" Brown for William Pitt, as a monument to Sir William Pynsent. King Alfred's Tower, a 161 feet (49 m) high triangular edifice, stands near Egbert's stone, where it is believed Alfred the Great, King of Wessex, rallied the Saxons in May 878 before the Battle of Edington. The tower's funder, Henry Hoare, planned for it to commemorate the end of the Seven Years' War against France and the accession of King George III. The other Grade I listed buildings in South Somerset are manor houses, built over long periods by local Lords of the Manor. In 1907, the Tudor Barrington Court became the first country house acquired by the National Trust, on the recommendation of the antiquarian Canon Hardwicke Rawnsley. Newton Surmaville was built between 1608 and 1612 for Robert Harbin, a Yeovil merchant, on the site of an earlier building, but was extensively altered and enhanced in the 1870s. Lytes Cary and its associated chapel and gardens have parts dating to as early as the 14th century. The architectural historian Nikolaus Pevsner praised it, saying "Yet all parts blend to perfection with one another and with the gentle sunny landscape that surrounds them." The 17th century house at Tintinhull is surrounded by a small 20th century Arts and Crafts garden. Ven House, which stands on an artificially raised terrace, has a rectangular plan of seven bays by five bays, and is built of red brick in Flemish bond, with local Hamstone dressings; its north and south fronts are divided by two giant Corinthian pilasters. The small William and Mary style house was completed sometime between 1698 and 1700. It was enlarged between 1725 and 1730 by Decimus Burton, who provided a new drawing room for Sir W. Medleycott and also an orangery attached to the house. Brympton d'Evercy, built in stages between about 1220 and the 18th century, has been described, by Auberon Waugh, as "the most beautiful house in England".

== Buildings ==
Name	Location	Type	Completed (Note: The date given is the date used by Historic England as significant for the initial building or that of an important part in the structure's description.)	Grid ref. (Note: The grid reference is based on the British national grid reference system, sometimes known as OSGB36, used by the Ordnance Survey.) Geo-coordinates	Entry number (Note: The "List Entry Number" is a unique number assigned to each listed building and scheduled monument by Historic England.)	Image	Ref.
Abbey Barn	Yeovil	Barn	c. 1420	ST5366416240; 50°56′37″N 2°39′39″W	1173463	Abbey Barn More images	
Abbey Farmhouse and farm gate and stile to north west corner	Montacute	Abbey Farmhouse	16th century	ST4959016889; 50°56′57″N 2°43′08″W	1057256	Abbey Farmhouse and farm gate and stile to north west corner More images	
Abbey Farm House	Yeovil	Farmhouse	c. 1420	ST5365916254; 50°56′38″N 2°39′40″W	1056512	Abbey Farm House More images	
Alfred's Tower	Brewham		1766	ST7454635125; 51°06′53″N 2°21′54″W	1175610	Alfred's Tower More images	
Barrington Court	Barrington	Manor House	c. 1514	ST3981318284; 50°57′39″N 2°51′30″W	1345920	Barrington Court More images	
Bow Bridge	Bruton	Footbridge	15th century	ST6835734821; 51°06′42″N 2°27′12″W	1176195	Bow Bridge More images	
Brympton d'Evercy Brympton House	Brympton		13th century	ST5197515425; 50°56′11″N 2°41′05″W	1057261	Brympton d'Evercy Brympton House More images	
Burton Pynsent Monument	Burton Pynsent, Curry Rivel	Prospect tower or eyecatcher.	1757	ST3767625160; 51°01′21″N 2°53′24″W	1039561	Burton Pynsent Monument More images	
Church of All Saints	Alford	Parish Church	15th century	ST6045232603; 51°05′29″N 2°33′58″W	1056264	Church of All Saints More images	
Church of All Saints	Sutton Bingham, Closworth	Parish Church	12th century	ST5478711123; 50°53′52″N 2°38′39″W	1057236	Church of All Saints More images	
Church of All Saints	Langport	Parish Church	12th century	ST4223126742; 51°02′14″N 2°49′31″W	1056616	Church of All Saints More images	
Church of All Saints	Martock	Parish Church	13th century	ST4612119154; 50°58′09″N 2°46′07″W	1065888	Church of All Saints More images	
Church of All Saints	West Camel	Parish Church	Late 14th century	ST5802524628; 51°01′10″N 2°35′59″W	1056769	Church of All Saints More images	
Church of St Aldhelm and St Eadburgha	Broadway	Parish Church	13th century	ST3296815901; 50°56′19″N 2°57′19″W	1248192	Church of St Aldhelm and St Eadburgha More images	
Church of St Andrew	Brympton	Parish Church	13th century	ST5192315380; 50°56′09″N 2°41′08″W	1057269	Church of St Andrew More images	
Church of St Andrew	Curry Rivel	Parish Church	13th century	ST3916925393; 51°01′29″N 2°52′07″W	1249281	Church of St Andrew More images	
Church of St Andrew	High Ham	Parish Church	12th century	ST4252831067; 51°04′34″N 2°49′18″W	1227591	Church of St Andrew More images	
Church of St Andrew	Whitestaunton	Parish Church	13th century	ST2804810496; 50°53′22″N 3°01′28″W	1263098	Church of St Andrew More images	
Church of St Barnabas	Queen Camel	Parish Church	14th century	ST5973724953; 51°01′21″N 2°34′32″W	1249203	Church of St Barnabas More images	
Church of St Bartholomew	Crewkerne	Parish Church	15th century	ST4395909800; 50°53′06″N 2°47′53″W	1208122	Church of St Bartholomew More images	
Church of St Catherine	Drayton	Parish Church	15th century	ST4051624768; 51°01′09″N 2°50′58″W	1236512	Church of St Catherine More images	
Church of St Catherine	Fivehead	Parish Church	12th century	ST3692923591; 51°00′30″N 2°54′01″W	1249584	Church of St Catherine More images	
Church of St George	Hinton St George	Parish Church	13th century	ST4184012685; 50°54′38″N 2°49′43″W	1056124	Church of St George More images	
Church of St James	Beercrocombe	Parish Church	13th century	ST3256420416; 50°58′45″N 2°57′43″W	1248982	Church of St James More images	
Church of St James	Curry Mallet	Parish Church	13th century	ST3339020908; 50°59′01″N 2°57′01″W	1039557	Church of St James More images	
Church of St John the Baptist	Yeovil	Parish Church	Late 14th century	ST5567616053; 50°56′32″N 2°37′56″W	1055713	Church of St John the Baptist More images	
Church of St John the Evangelist	Milborne Port	Parish Church	11th century	ST6763618538; 50°57′55″N 2°27′44″W	1295666	Church of St John the Evangelist More images	
Church of St Margaret	Tintinhull	Parish Church	13th century	ST4985119706; 50°58′28″N 2°42′56″W	1235407	Church of St Margaret More images	
Church of St Martin	Fivehead	Parish Church	13th century		1249564	Church of St Martin More images	
Church of St Martin	Kingsbury Episcopi	Parish Church	14th century	ST4364821080; 50°59′11″N 2°48′15″W	1056885	Church of St Martin More images	
Church of St Martin	North Perrott	Parish Church	12th century	ST4720709529; 50°52′58″N 2°45′07″W	1056879	Church of St Martin More images	
Church of St Mary	Bruton	Parish Church	c. 1350	ST6845534795; 51°06′42″N 2°27′07″W	1056408	Church of St Mary More images	
Church of St Mary	Ilminster	Parish Church	15th century	ST3602014572; 50°55′37″N 2°54′42″W	1208692	Church of St Mary More images	
Church of St Mary	Limington	Parish Church	Late 14th century	ST5415822372; 50°59′56″N 2°39′17″W	1056844	Church of St Mary More images	
Church of St Mary	Marston Magna	Parish Church	c. 1360		1296098	Church of St Mary More images	
Church of St Mary	Mudford	Parish Church	14th century	ST5736619944; 50°58′38″N 2°36′31″W	1056790	Church of St Mary More images	
Church of St Mary	Rimpton	Parish Church	Early 13th century	ST6104321858; 50°59′41″N 2°33′23″W	1295576	Church of St Mary More images	
Church of St Mary Magdalene	Stocklinch	Parish Church	13th century	ST3830217187; 50°57′03″N 2°52′47″W	1057061	Church of St Mary Magdalene More images	
Church of St Mary the Virgin	Barrington	Parish Church	13th century	ST3890818118; 50°57′33″N 2°52′16″W	1056904	Church of St Mary the Virgin More images	
Church of St Mary the Virgin	Chard	Parish Church	Late 11th century	ST3230308207; 50°52′10″N 2°57′48″W	1297140	Church of St Mary the Virgin More images	
Church of St Mary the Virgin	Isle Abbotts	Parish Church	13th century	ST3526520947; 50°59′03″N 2°55′25″W	1249594	Church of St Mary the Virgin More images	
Church of St Mary the Virgin	Norton Sub Hamdon	Parish Church	13th century	ST4706015956; 50°56′26″N 2°45′17″W	1253811	Church of St Mary the Virgin More images	
Church of St Mary the Virgin	East Stoke, Stoke-sub-Hamdon	Parish Church	12th century	ST4839217277; 50°57′09″N 2°44′10″W	1260420	Church of St Mary the Virgin More images	
Church of St Michael	North Cadbury	Parish Church	1417	ST6354227054; 51°02′30″N 2°31′17″W	1178133	Church of St Michael More images	
Church of St Michael	Shepton Beauchamp	Parish Church	13th century	ST4029817159; 50°57′03″N 2°51′05″W	1237246	Church of St Michael More images	
Church of St Michael and All Angels	Somerton	Parish Church	13th century	ST4904428617; 51°03′17″N 2°43′42″W	1056695	Church of St Michael and All Angels More images	
Church of St Nicholas	Combe St Nicholas	Parish Church	13th century	ST3015111249; 50°53′47″N 2°59′40″W	1248506	Church of St Nicholas More images	
Church of St Peter	Yeovilton	Church	Early 14th century	ST5456024929; 51°01′19″N 2°38′57″W	1295400	Church of St Peter More images	
Church of St Peter and St Paul	Charlton Adam, Charlton Mackrell	Parish Church	14th century	ST5351028664; 51°03′20″N 2°39′53″W	1056762	Church of St Peter and St Paul More images	
Church of St Peter and St Paul	Muchelney	Parish Church	15th century	ST4289724908; 51°01′15″N 2°48′56″W	1247849	Church of St Peter and St Paul More images	
Church of St Peter and St Paul	South Petherton	Parish Church	13th century	ST4323616862; 50°56′54″N 2°48′34″W	1056959	Church of St Peter and St Paul More images	
Church of St Vincent	Ashington, Chilton Cantelo	Parish Church	13th century	ST5611121410; 50°59′25″N 2°37′36″W	1345984	Church of St Vincent More images	
Church of the Blessed Virgin Mary	Huish Episcopi	Parish Church	12th century	ST4271626625; 51°02′10″N 2°49′06″W	1056633	Church of the Blessed Virgin Mary More images	
Church of the Holy Trinity	Wyke Champflower, Bruton	Parish Church	1623	ST6619034310; 51°06′25″N 2°29′04″W	1366339	Church of the Holy Trinity More images	
Church of the Holy Trinity	Long Sutton	Parish Church	15th century	ST4695625305; 51°01′29″N 2°45′28″W	1236060	Church of the Holy Trinity More images	
Church of the Holy Trinity	Sutton Montis, South Cadbury	Parish Church	12th century	ST6243324799; 51°01′17″N 2°32′13″W	1259115	Church of the Holy Trinity More images	
Church without dedication	High Ham	Parish Church	Early 17th century	ST4324029100; 51°03′30″N 2°48′41″W	1346080	Church without dedication More images	
Coker Court	East Coker	Manor House	15th century	ST5384412164; 50°54′26″N 2°39′28″W	1057176	Coker Court More images	
Hymerford House	East Coker	House	15th century	ST5390412924; 50°54′50″N 2°39′25″W	1057157	Hymerford House More images	
Lytes Cary	Charlton Mackrell	Manor House	14th century	ST5331726557; 51°02′11″N 2°40′02″W	1056764	Lytes Cary More images	
Manor House	West Coker	Manor House	c. 1500	ST5199113520; 50°55′09″N 2°41′04″W	1345845	Manor House More images	
Midelney Manor, forecourt and garden walling with gate piers	Drayton	Manor House	Late 16th century	ST4101622879; 51°00′08″N 2°50′31″W	1056918	Midelney Manor, forecourt and garden walling with gate piers More images	
Montacute House	Montacute	Country House	c. 1601	ST4993617153; 50°57′06″N 2°42′51″W	1252021	Montacute House More images	
North-east and south-east pavilions to east forecourt, Montacute House	Montacute		c. 1601	ST4999317117; 50°57′05″N 2°42′48″W	1262475	North-east and south-east pavilions to east forecourt, Montacute House More images	
Walls, turrets and gateway to east forecourt of Montacute House	Montacute		c. 1601	ST4997917151; 50°57′06″N 2°42′49″W	1252025	Walls, turrets and gateway to east forecourt of Montacute House More images	
Naish Priory, including attached priory cottage and north boundary railings	East Coker		c. 1400	ST5382513865; 50°55′21″N 2°39′30″W	1057189	Naish Priory, including attached priory cottage and north boundary railings More images	
Newton Surmaville	Barwick	Country House	1612	ST5652915395; 50°56′11″N 2°37′12″W	1345788	Newton Surmaville More images	
North Cadbury Court	North Cadbury		1610	ST6359827026; 51°02′29″N 2°31′14″W	1178213	North Cadbury Court More images	
Parsonage Farmhouse The Priory	Stoke-sub-Hamdon		14th century	ST4735317408; 50°57′13″N 2°45′03″W	1260178	Parsonage Farmhouse The Priory More images	
Sexey's Hospital west wing, with chapel	Bruton	Almshouse	c. 1638	ST6810834713; 51°06′39″N 2°27′25″W	1176086	Sexey's Hospital west wing, with chapel More images	
Stavordale Priory	Charlton Musgrove		13th century	ST7363732020; 51°05′13″N 2°22′40″W	1176699	Stavordale Priory More images	
Shanks House	Cucklington	Country House	17th century	ST7533226667; 51°02′20″N 2°21′12″W	1222369	Shanks House More images	
Swell Court Farmhouse	Fivehead	Manor House	15th century	ST3689623579; 51°00′29″N 2°54′03″W	1249582	Swell Court Farmhouse More images	
The Abbey	Charlton Adam, Charlton Mackrell	House	Late 16th century	ST5355428690; 51°03′20″N 2°39′51″W	1056727	The Abbey More images	
The Abbot's House, Muchelney Abbey	Muchelney		14th century	ST4284924847; 51°01′13″N 2°48′58″W	1236790	The Abbot's House, Muchelney Abbey More images	
The Chantry House The Dower House	Brympton		13th century	ST5194115398; 50°56′10″N 2°41′07″W	1263253	The Chantry House The Dower House More images	
The Dogs	Wincanton	House	c. 1650	ST7133728484; 51°03′18″N 2°24′37″W	1273913	Upload Photo	
The Hanging Chapel	Langport	Gateway	13th century	ST4233026747; 51°02′14″N 2°49′26″W	1056615	The Hanging Chapel More images	
The Treasurers House	Martock		13th century	50°58′07″N 2°46′02″W	1225764	The Treasurers House More images	
Tintinhull Court	Tintinhull	House	1678	ST4987319669; 50°58′27″N 2°42′55″W	1235516	Tintinhull Court More images	
Tintinhull House	Tintinhull	House	17th century	ST5024619742; 50°58′30″N 2°42′36″W	1265231	Tintinhull House More images	
Ven House	Milborne Port	County House	1730	ST6804518430; 50°57′52″N 2°27′23″W	1056286	Ven House More images	
Main entrance gateway, 35 metres North-West of Ven House	Milborne Port	Entrance Gateway	1730	ST6810618500; 50°57′54″N 2°27′20″W	1175037	Upload Photo	
Corridor linking Ven House and the Orangery	Milborne Port	Pavilion to Country house	1836	ST6802318440; 50°57′52″N 2°27′24″W	1056288	Upload Photo	
North-East Pavilion and balustraded brick wall, Ven House	Milborne Port	Pavilion to country house	1730	ST6808518426; 50°57′52″N 2°27′21″W	1366378	Upload Photo	
North-West Pavilion and balustraded link wall, Ven House	Milborne Port	Pavilion to Country house	1730	ST6803118472; 50°57′53″N 2°27′24″W	1056287	Upload Photo	
Stabling and other outbuildings, attached to East side of Ven House	Milborne Port	Stables	1730	ST6807818403; 50°57′51″N 2°27′21″W	1366379	Upload Photo	
Terrace along South Garden front, Ven House	Milborne Port	Pavilion to Country house	1730	ST6805618403; 50°57′51″N 2°27′23″W	1056289	Upload Photo	
The Orangery, attached to the South West corner of Ven House	Milborne Port	Entrance Gateway	1730	ST6801318444; 50°57′52″N 2°27′25″W	1295483	Upload Photo	
Waterloo House and Manor Court House	Fore Street, Chard	House and courtroom	Late 16th century	ST3218008600; 50°52′22″N 2°57′55″W	1197449	Waterloo House and Manor Court House More images	
Wayford Manor House	Wayford	Manor House	c. 1600	ST4046006627; 50°51′22″N 2°50′50″W	1177681	Wayford Manor House More images	
Whitestaunton Manor	Whitestaunton	Manor House	15th century	ST2800410471; 50°53′21″N 3°01′30″W	1250783	Whitestaunton Manor More images	
Wigborough Manor House	South Petherton	Manor House	1585	ST4479515147; 50°55′59″N 2°47′13″W	1056928	Wigborough Manor House More images	
Earnshill House	Hambridge and Westport	Country house		ST3859621722	1249217	Earnshill House More images	

== See also ==
- Grade I listed buildings in Somerset
- List of Somerset towers
- Grade II* listed buildings in South Somerset
