= Church of St James, Beercrocombe =

Church in Somerset, England

Church of St James
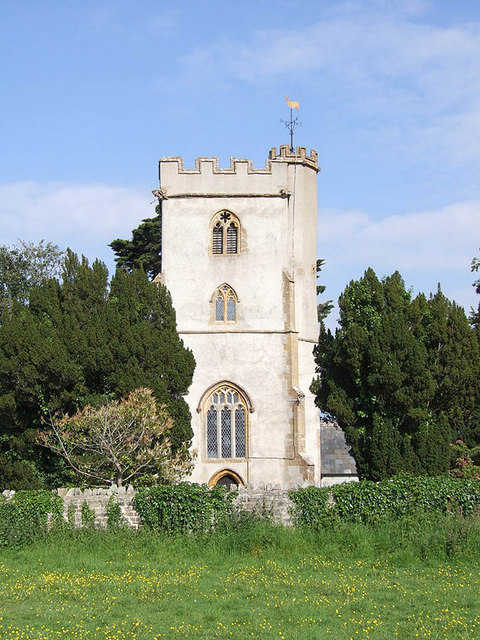

- Location within Somerset
- 50°58′44″N 2°57′39″W
- Location: Beercrocombe, Somerset, England

History
- Built: 13th century

Listed Building – Grade I
- Official name: Church of St James
- Designated: 17 April 1959
- Reference no.: 1248982

The Church of St James in Beercrocombe, Somerset, England, dates from the 13th century but the current building is predominantly from the 15th. It was restored in the late 19th century. It has been designated as a Grade I listed building.

The interior includes a 17th-century fireplace, and pews from the late 13th or early 14th century.

The bells in the two-stage tower were restored in 1999, after 80 years of silence, and the peal restored to its original five bells.

It is a church within the Seven Sowers benefice which includes Curry Mallet, Hatch Beauchamp, Orchard Portman, Staple Fitzpaine, Stoke St Mary (with Thurlbear) and West Hatch. It is within the archdeanery of Taunton.

== See also ==
- List of Grade I listed buildings in South Somerset
- List of towers in Somerset
- List of ecclesiastical parishes in the Diocese of Bath and Wells
