= Stoke sub Hamdon Priory =

Grade I listed building in Somerset, England

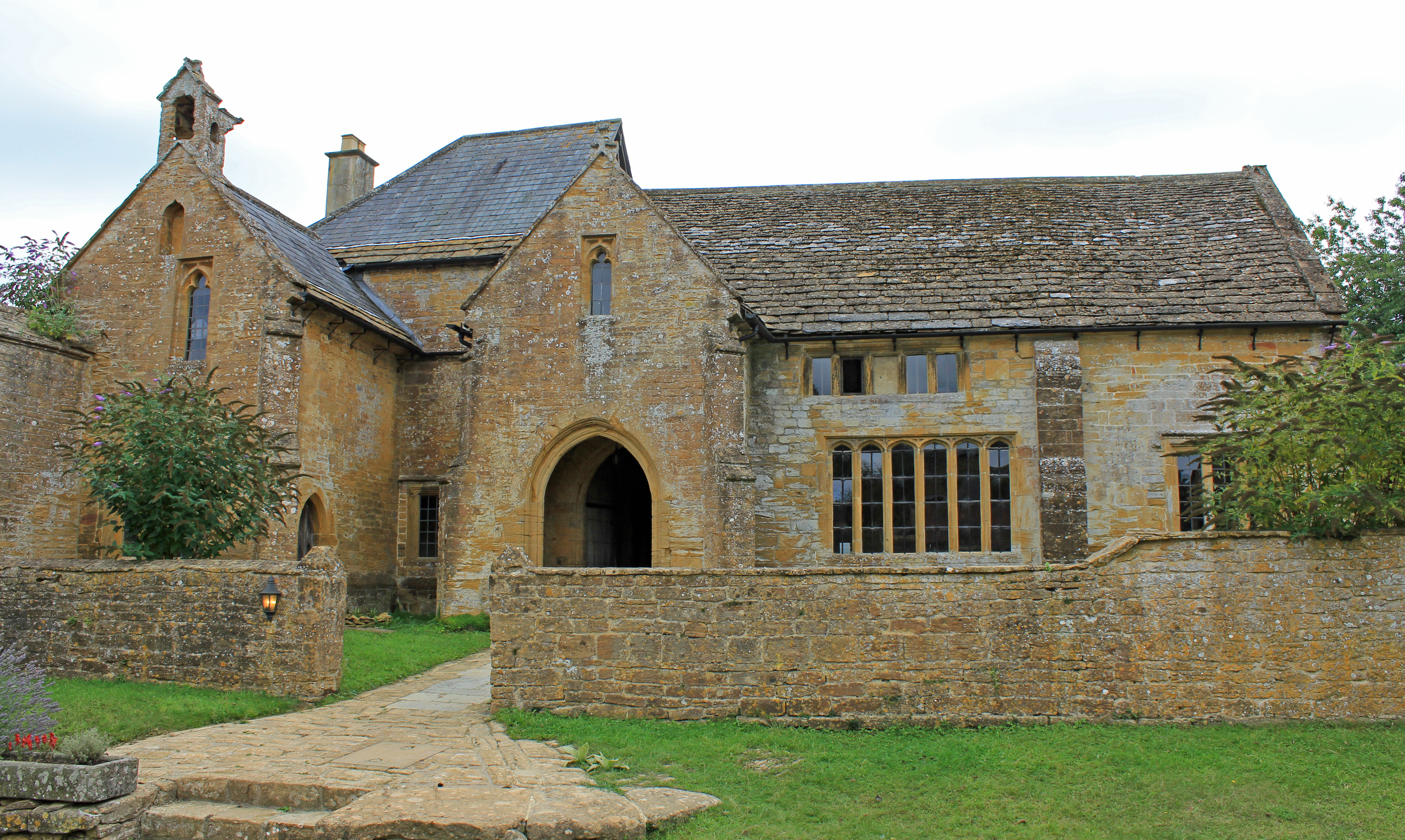
- The north end of the house (left), and the attached great hall (right) at Stoke sub Hamdon Priory

- Location within Somerset
- 50.9545°N 2.7488°W
- Location: Stoke-sub-Hamdon, Somerset, England

History
- Built: 1304
- Built for: John de Beauchamp, 1st Baron Beauchamp
- Rebuilt: c. 1450–60

Site notes
- Restored: 1967
- Owner: National Trust

Stoke sub Hamdon Priory is a complex of buildings and ruins which initially formed a 14th-century college for the chantry chapel of St Nicholas, and later was the site of a farm in Stoke-sub-Hamdon, Somerset, England. The only building remaining from the college is a great hall and attached dwelling, dating from the late 15th century. The hall is designated by English Heritage as a Grade I listed building, while the outbuildings and gateway are Grade II listed. The whole site has been scheduled as an ancient monument. A number of the farm buildings are in poor condition, and have been added to the Heritage at Risk Register.

The college was formed in 1304 as a chantry college, funded by John de Beauchamp, 1st Baron Beauchamp to serve the free chapel in his nearby manor house. Over the following 150 years, the college fell into disrepair and was rebuilt around 1460. During the dissolution, the land passed into the laity, and was a tenanted farm until the middle of the 20th century. The National Trust bought the property in 1946, and with the exception of the part of the house which is inhabited, the site is now open to the public. Despite being known as "The Priory", or "Stoke sub Hamdon Priory", the building has never been used as a priory, and there is no record of a monastic house in Stoke sub Hamdon.

== History ==
Originally, a rectory was located on the site, which provided a home for the rector who officiated in the private chapel of St. Nicholas in the Beauchamp manor house nearby. When the rector, Henry de Wyk, resigned in 1304, the lord of the manor, John de Beauchamp, 1st Baron Beauchamp, established a chantry and founded a college for five chaplains. (Note: "College" in this sense refers to a complex in which secular clergy lived, but without the strict confines of a monastic order.) It is suggested in the English Heritage listing that the rectory was probably already owned by the Beauchamps, but if not they purchased it upon de Wyk's departure. The college was composed of four priests governed by a provost, and was attached to the manor house chapel. A National Trust report referenced in the Historic Environment Record could not determine if the pre-1304 rectory was retained for the college's use, or if a new building was erected instead.

In 1444, a report by the Bishop of Bath and Wells, Thomas Beckington, recorded that, due to poor management by the provost, the college had fallen into disrepair: the buildings were in a bad state, and only two priests remained alongside the provost, rather than the intended four. Beckington gave the governance of the college to the precentor of Wells, and a few years later the current building was erected. In his article, Chantry Priests' Houses and other Medieval Lodgings, W. A. Pantin suggests that this building is probably smaller than the original college, due to the reduced number of clergy, and that it was most likely erected around 1450–60. The English Heritage listing refers to the surviving building as being "apparently the Provost's Lodging." From 1473 to 1508 Provost Coorte was in charge; however for 36 years during that time he was non-resident.

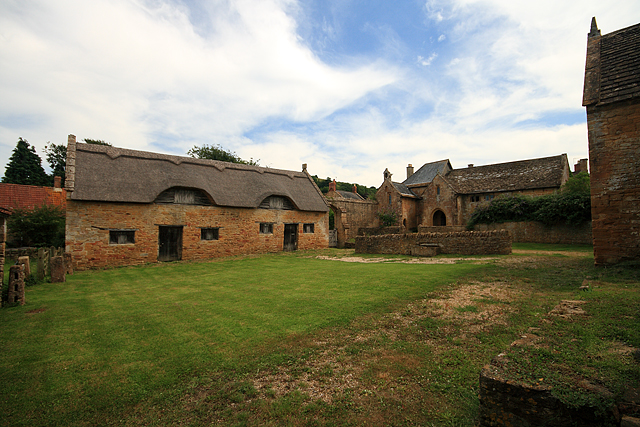
Priory stable

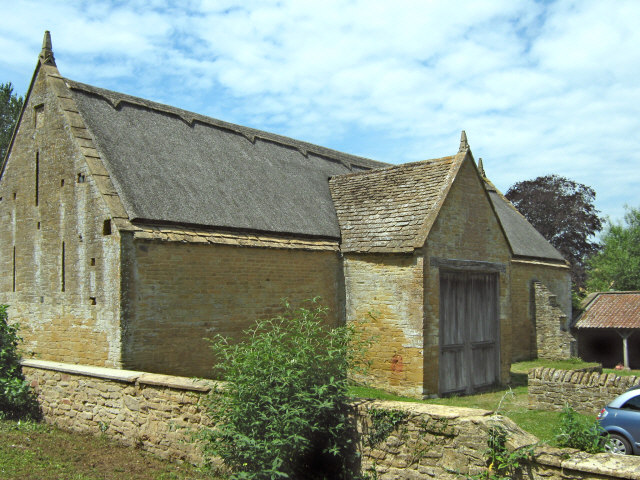
The old barn

During the reign of Henry VIII the chantry was under the control of the crown with Provosts Woulset and Carmer both being the kings chaplains and it unlikely that any investment was made in Stoke sub Hamdon Priory. By the time of the dissolution in 1548, the chantry was already greatly reduced. The chantry holder, Thomas Canner, was also the parish priest, but performed his duties by deputy: he supplied one to carry out his parochial role, and another to perform his chantry duties. The college building had become a free chapel, and served as a chapel of ease for the village's residents, offering a convenient alternative to the parish church of St Mary the Virgin which was a mile away in East Stoke. The Abolition of Chantries Act resulted in the college buildings being sold to the laity in 1548. The ownership of the estate exchanged hands frequently over the following 70 years, and during most of the period it was leased out to various tenants. The college was converted into a private house, and underwent significant renovation. Pantin suggests that the building work can be approximately dated to the period in which the Strode family inhabited the house, based upon an inscription in some panelling, "1585/TS", in which the TS stands for Thomas Strode. The building was also expanded on its south side, along the street. Over the subsequent three centuries, the estate was primarily passed on through marriage and inheritance within families, though it was sold a few times; primarily the ownership was held by the Robinsons, the Rodbards, and the Hawkesworths. None of the three families lived on the estate, which was at the time a farm worked by a string of lessees.

In 1897 John William Bain Hawkesworth sold part of the holding, keeping just the house and some land. The farm was known as Parsonage Farm from the middle of the 19th century, and continued to be tended until around 1960. The property was purchased by the National Trust in 1946, and some restoration work was conducted in 1967. The complex of buildings was scheduled as an ancient monument in May 1951, and the former chantry house was listed as a Grade I building in April 1961. At the same time, the other buildings on site were listed as Grade II buildings: the gateway and wall, three barns (one of which is ruined), a ruined outbuilding and a dovecote.

== Architecture ==
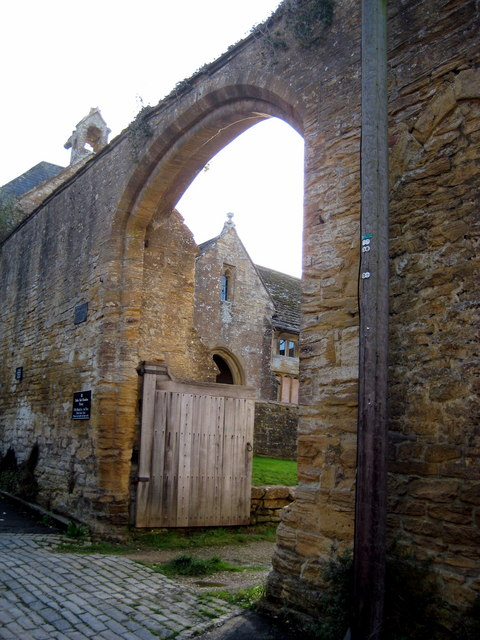
The gateway

The buildings are constructed from Hamstone, a Jurassic limestone quarried on the local Ham Hill.

The priory itself is linked to a barn by a wall. It includes a gateway which provides access from North Street. The 5 metres (16 ft) high wall dates from the 15th century and includes an arched gateway which has a buttress on its western side. The barn is largely from the 18th century; however it incorporates material from the former building. The southern end is supported by two buttresses and the north side includes a door on the first floor.

The other barn which is about 25 metres (82 ft) north west of The Priory was built in the 15th century. It has partially thatched roof, and served as a tithe barn. The other outbuilding which is about 40 metres (130 ft) north west of The Priory may once have been used as a wagon shed. A further 15th century barn to the west of The Priory is now ruined, following a fire in 1969. It is close to the circular Dovecote which may date from the 14th century. Pigeons and doves were an important food source historically kept for their eggs, flesh, and dung.

The main priory building itself is of an L-shaped plan and consists of three unequal wings. The oldest part contains the hall, screens and dormitory. This was built in the 14th century but contains stones from the previous building, which show oblique tooling found in Norman architecture. The two-storey hall is 28 feet (8.5 m) long and 18 feet (5.5 m) wide. It was originally used as the refectory, with a window being added by Bishop Beckington in the 15th century, and later became a coal store. The hall also has arches into bays and an ogee-headed recess which may have been an aumbry. At the eastern end of the hall is a parlour on the ground floor and, on the first floor, is a dormitory. The chapel next to the dormitory can be seen through a squint which is unusually combined with a piscina.

The central block south of the hall contains the dining room and kitchen on the ground floor with bedrooms above. Both have chamfered beams made of elm which are approximately 19 feet (5.8 m) long. Centrally between the two rooms is a large medieval fireplace including a bread oven. Next to the kitchen is the large south store.

== See also ==
- Grade I listed buildings in South Somerset
- List of National Trust properties in Somerset
