= Church of St James, Curry Mallet =

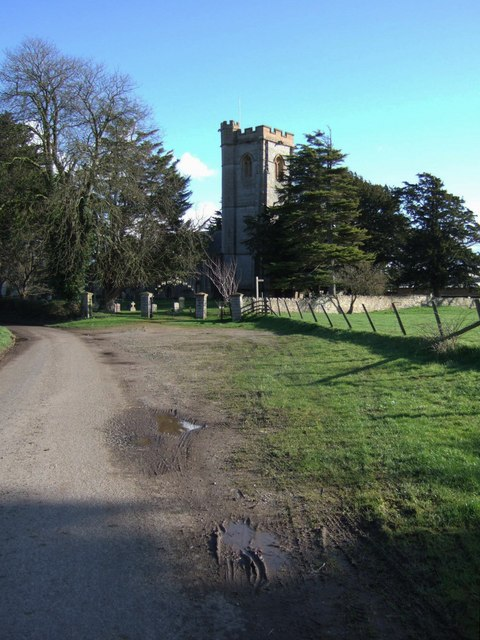

- Location within Somerset
- 50°59′01″N 2°56′59″W
- Location: Curry Mallet, Somerset
- Country: England
- Denomination: Church of England
- Churchmanship: Conservative Evangelical

History
- Status: Active

Architecture
- Functional status: Parish church
- Heritage designation: Grade I listed
- Designated: 17 April 1959
- Completed: 13th-century

The Church of St James is a Church of England parish church in Curry Mallet, Somerset. It has 13th-century origins and has been designated as a Grade I listed building.

== History ==
The church is dedicated to All Saints, It has a three-stage tower. On the stonework are hunky punks representing animals. Inside the church is a 15th-century font.

=== Present day ===
The parish is part of the Seven Sowers benefice which covers Beercrocombe, Curry Mallet, Hatch Beauchamp, Orchard Portman, Staple Fitzpaine, Stoke St Mary (with Thurlbear) and West Hatch, within the deanery of Crewkerne and Ilminster.

== See also ==
- List of Grade I listed buildings in South Somerset
- List of towers in Somerset
- List of ecclesiastical parishes in the Diocese of Bath and Wells
