= Church of St Mary the Virgin, Barrington =

Church in Somerset, England

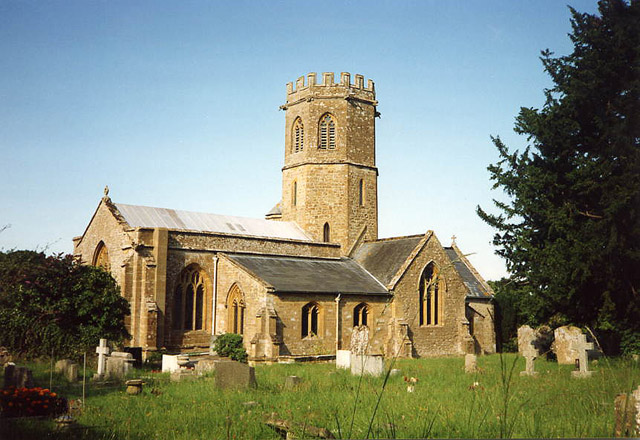

- Location within Somerset
- 50°57′34″N 2°52′16″W
- Location: Barrington, Somerset, England

History
- Built: 13th century

Listed Building – Grade I
- Official name: Church of St Mary the Virgin
- Designated: 17 April 1959
- Reference no.: 1056904

The Church of St Mary the Virgin in Barrington, Somerset, England dates from the 13th century and has been designated as a Grade I listed building.

St Mary's Church has a three bay nave two bay chancel. There is an unusual octagonal tower, which includes a bell dating from 1743 and made by Thomas Bilbie of the Bilbie family.

The south transept includes a 13th-century canopied piscina. There is a 19th-century panelled pulpit which may contain fragments of an earlier construction.

The parish is part of the benefice of Winsmoor within the deanery of Crewkerne and Ilminster.

== See also ==
- Grade I listed buildings in South Somerset
- List of Somerset towers
- List of ecclesiastical parishes in the Diocese of Bath and Wells
