= Hundred of South Petherton =

Historical Hundred of Somerset, England

South Petherton Hundred
- Area
- 14,680 acres (5,940 ha)
- Status: Hundred
  - HQ: South Petherton
- Subdivisions
  - Type: Parishes
  - Units: Barrington, Chaffcombe, Chillington, Cricket St Thomas, Cudworth, Dinnington, Dowlish Wake, St Giles Knowle, Lopen, Niden, South Petherton, Seavington St Mary, Seavington St Michael, Shepton Beauchamp, and Whitestaunton

The Hundred of South Petherton is one of the 40 historical Hundreds in the ceremonial county of Somerset, England, dating from before the Norman conquest during the Anglo-Saxon era although exact dates are unknown. Each hundred had a 'fyrd', which acted as the local defence force and a court which was responsible for the maintenance of the frankpledge system. They also formed a unit for the collection of taxes. The role of the hundred court was described in the Dooms (laws) of King Edgar. The name of the hundred was normally that of its meeting-place.

The Hundred of South Petherton was based on the area covered by the Royal Estate of South Petherton which had existed before 1066. In the 13th century it included Shepton Beauchamp, Lopen, Whitestaunton, Cudworth, Dowlish Wake, Westcombland in Buckland St Mary, and probably Hurcott in Seavington St Mary. Later it also included the ancient parishes of: Barrington, Chaffcombe, Chillington, Cricket St Thomas, Dinnington, St Giles Knowle, Niden and Seavington St Michael. It covered an area of 14,680 acres (5,940 ha).

The importance of the hundred courts declined from the seventeenth century. By the 19th century several different single-purpose subdivisions of counties, such as poor law unions, sanitary districts, and highway districts sprang up, filling the administrative role previously played by parishes and hundreds. Although the Hundreds have never been formally abolished, their functions ended with the establishment of county courts in 1867 and the introduction of districts by the Local Government Act 1894.
