= Midelney Manor =

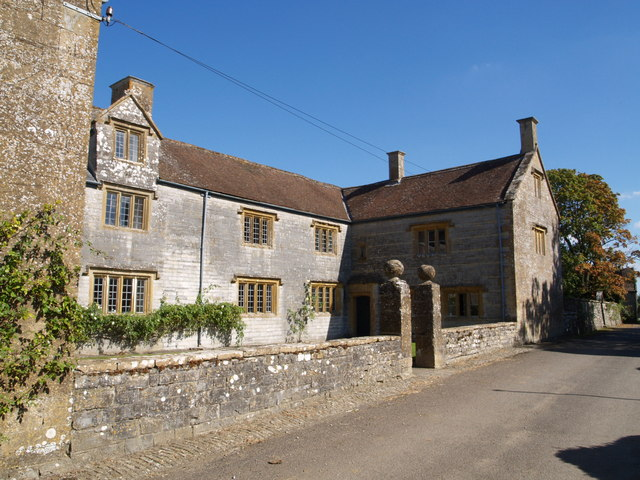

- Location within Somerset
- 51°00′08″N 2°50′31″W
- Location: Drayton, Somerset, England

History
- Built: Late 16th century

Listed Building – Grade I
- Official name: Midelney Manor, Forecourt and Garden Walling With Gate Piers
- Designated: 17 April 1959
- Reference no.: 1056918

Midelney Manor in Drayton, Somerset, England was built in the late 16th century in two distinct halves by Richard and Thomas Trevillian. It has been designated as a Grade I listed building.

The manor house is sited on a former island site, and was the property of Muchelney Abbey, passing to the Trevillian family after the dissolution of the monasteries.

The building incorporates fragments of an earlier medieval building on the site which burned down.

At the rear of the house is an 18th-century falcon mews.

In 1985 the Manor was the venue for a television quiz series in which guests identify the origin and use of various artifacts.

== See also ==
- List of Grade I listed buildings in South Somerset
