= Church of St Michael, Shepton Beauchamp =

Church in Somerset, England

Church of St Michael
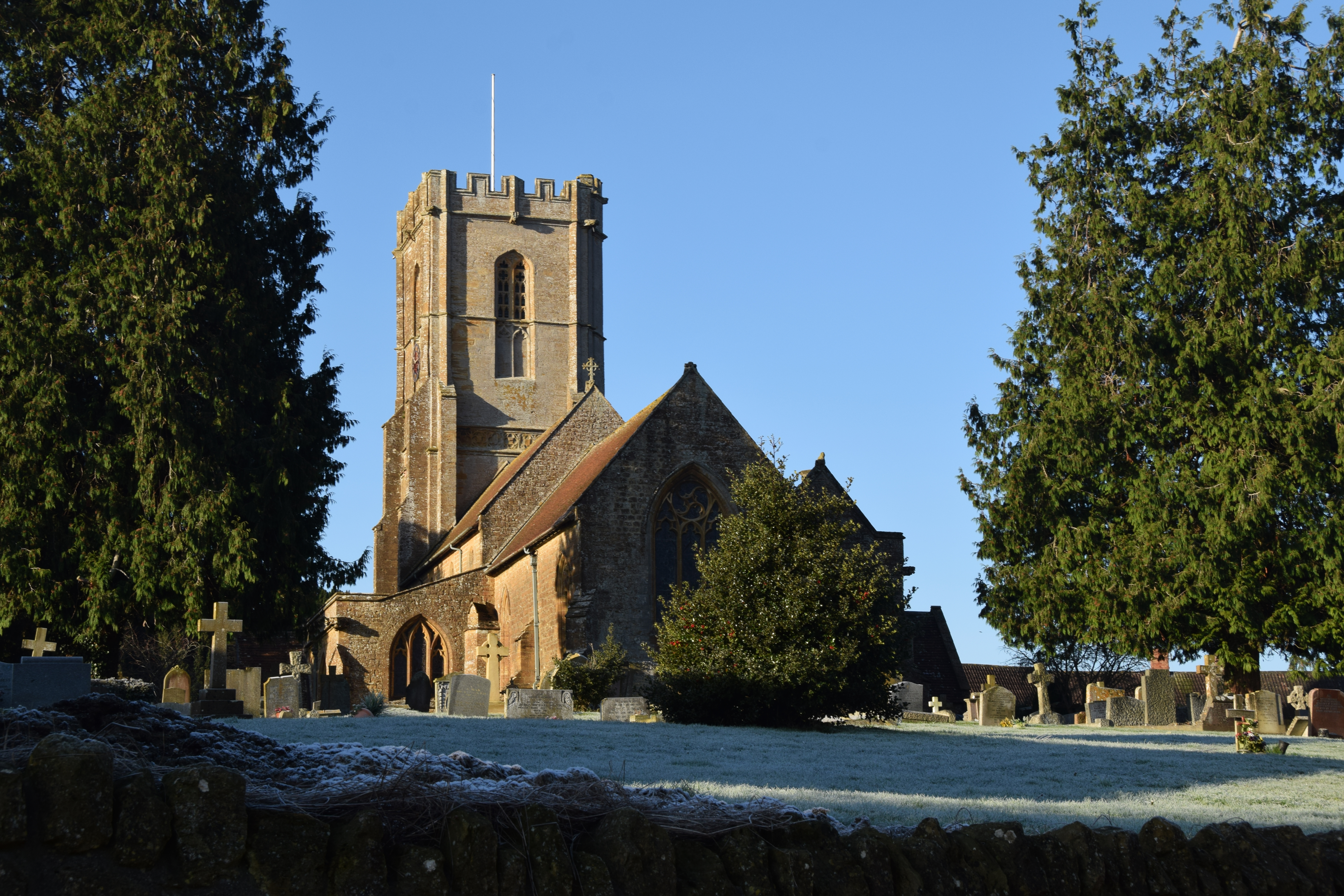

- Location within Somerset
- 50°57′01″N 2°50′57″W
- Location: Shepton Beauchamp, Somerset, England

History
- Built: 13th century

Listed Building – Grade I
- Official name: Church of St Michael
- Designated: 4 February 1958
- Reference no.: 1237246

The Church of St Michael in Shepton Beauchamp, Somerset, England is built of local hamstone, and has 13th-century origins, although it has been extensively changed since then, with major renovation in 1865 by George Edmund Street. It has been designated as a Grade I listed building.

The building is of lias and Ham stone and is made up of a chancel with a north chapel and a vestry, a nave and tall three-stage west tower, dating from 1477, which was largely rebuilt in the 16th century. It has set-back buttresses ascending to the shafts of former pinnacles, set off with an embattled parapet and gargoyles. There are two-light traceried bell-chamber windows with stone grilles, continuing as blank openings on the ringing chamber below. There are clocks with Roman numerals to the west and south faces and a higher polygonal stair-turret to the north corner. The tower holds eight bells several of which date back to 1738 and were made by the Bilbie family.

The former rectory, now called Beauchamp Manor, was built in 1874 for the rector V.S.S. Coles to house his curates and visitors.

The parish is part of the Winsmoor benefice within the Crewkerne and Ilminster deanery.

== See also ==
- Grade I listed buildings in South Somerset
- List of Somerset towers
- List of ecclesiastical parishes in the Diocese of Bath and Wells
