= Abbey Farmhouse, Montacute =

Abbey Farmhouse
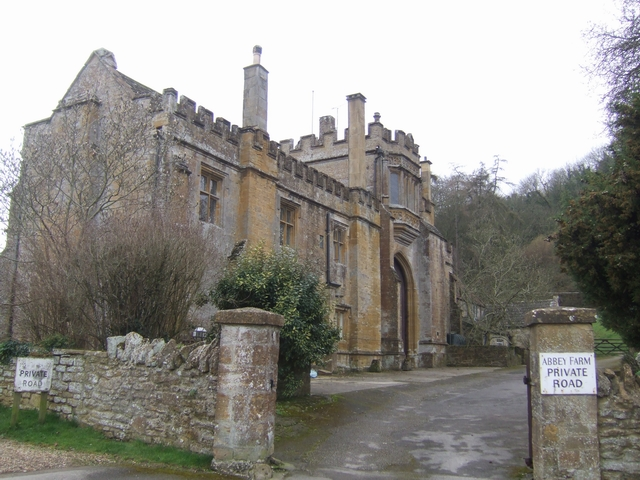

- Location within Somerset
- 50°56′54″N 2°43′10″W
- Location: Montacute, Somerset, England

History
- Built: 16th century

Listed Building – Grade I
- Official name: Abbey Farmhouse and Farm Gate and Stile to North West Corner
- Designated: 19 April 1961
- Reference no.: 1057256

Abbey Farmhouse is a detached house in Montacute, Somerset, England, which incorporates the gateway of the medieval Montacute Priory. It was built in the 16th century and has been designated as a Grade I listed building.

After the dissolution of the monasteries the property became a farmhouse, but by 1633 it was 'almost desolate'. By 1782 it was a revitalised farm, remaining part of the Phelips estate until 1918.

There are 2.5 acres (1.0 ha) of walled gardens, which have been laid out since 1963.

A long-distance public footpath, the Monarch's Way runs along the course of a Roman (or earlier) trackway immediately in front of the building. This path leads to Ham Hill Country Park via fields and woodland

== See also ==
- List of Grade I listed buildings in South Somerset
