= Abbey Barn, Yeovil =

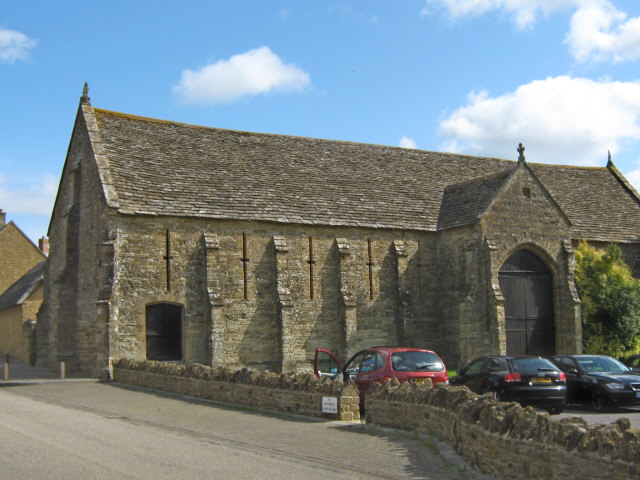

- Location within Somerset
- 50°56′38″N 2°39′40″W
- Location: Preston Plucknett, Yeovil, Somerset, England

History
- Built: c. 1420

Listed Building – Grade I
- Designated: 19 March 1951
- Reference no.: 1173463

Scheduled monument

The Abbey Barn in Preston Plucknett, Yeovil, Somerset, England was built around 1420 by John Stourton (died 1438), in conjunction with the Abbey Farm House. It has been designated as a Grade I listed building, and Scheduled Ancient Monument.

With an internal length of 31.4 metres (103 ft), it is the longest barn in Somerset.

It is now used as a building contractors showroom and store.

== See also ==
- List of Grade I listed buildings in South Somerset
