= Church of St Peter and St Paul, Charlton Adam =

Church in Somerset, England

Church of St Peter and St Paul
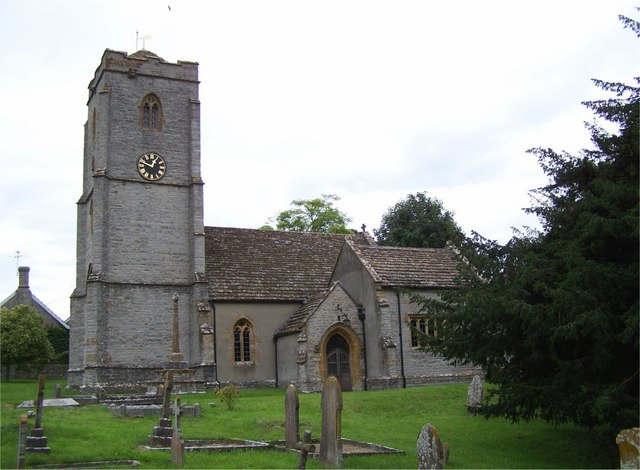

- Location within Somerset
- 51°03′20″N 2°39′53″W
- Location: Charlton Adam, Charlton Mackrell, Somerset, England

History
- Built: 15th century

Listed Building – Grade I
- Official name: Church of St Peter and St Paul
- Designated: 17 April 1959
- Reference no.: 1056762

The Church of St Peter and St Paul at Charlton Adam in the parish of Charlton Mackrell, Somerset, England has 14th-century origins, however most of the current building is from the 15th century. It has been designated as a Grade I listed building.

Between 1142 and 1166 the church in Charlton Adam was held by Bruton Abbey. It was originally dedicated to St Peter the Apostle with the double dedication being adopted some time in the 16th or 17th century.

Restoration work was undertaken in 1860 when the barrel roof in the nave was installed and galleries removed.

The tower has a peal of five bells. The earliest is from around 1490 and was made by a Bristol foundry, those from 1714 and 1738 were by the Bilbie family with the most recent being from T. Mears of London made in 1832. They are mounted on a 16th-century bell frame which become rotten, and the bells had not been rung since 1916. This was restored in 2005.

The font dates from the 12th century and the pulpit is Jacobean.

An engraved glass screen has been installed on the belfry balcony, decorated with the emblems of St Peter and St Paul accompanied by British plants.

The parish is part of the benefice of Somerton with Compton Dundon and The Charltons within the deanery of Ivelchester.

== See also ==
- Grade I listed buildings in South Somerset
- List of Somerset towers
- List of ecclesiastical parishes in the Diocese of Bath and Wells
