= Church of the Holy Trinity, Sutton Montis =

Church in Somerset, England

Church of the Holy Trinity
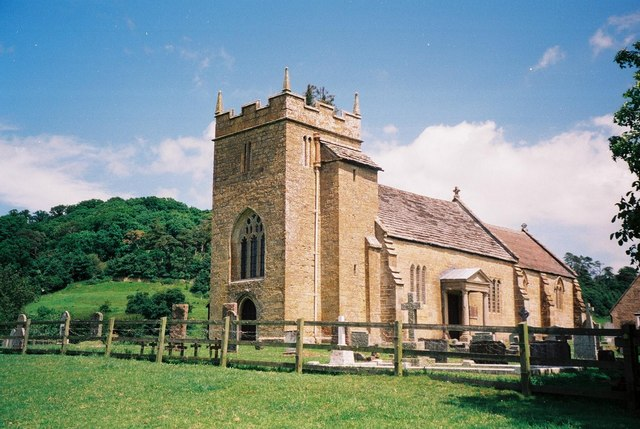

- Location within Somerset
- 51°01′15″N 02°32′13″W
- Location: Sutton Montis, South Cadbury and Sutton Montis, Somerset, England

History
- Built: 12th century

Listed Building – Grade I
- Official name: Church of the Holy Trinity
- Designated: 24 March 1961
- Reference no.: 1259115

The Anglican Church of the Holy Trinity at Sutton Montis in the parish of South Cadbury and Sutton Montis, Somerset, England, has Saxon origins but most of the surviving building is from the 12th century and subsequent periods. It has been designated as a Grade I listed building.

The first building on the site was Saxon, however most of the current Doulting stone building is from the 12th century and has been revised in the centuries since, with major Victorian restoration in 1862. The Norman building seats approximately 80 people within the three-bay nave and chancel. The west tower has three bells, dating from 1420, 1636 and 1764.

The octagonal font is from the 15th century, and the wooden pulpit from the 17th.

To enable the use of multimedia within services a sound system and projection screen were installed in the church. Ramped access for disabled churchgoers has also been installed.

The parish is within the Cam Vale benefice within the Diocese of Bath and Wells.

== See also ==
- List of Grade I listed buildings in South Somerset
- List of towers in Somerset
- List of ecclesiastical parishes in the Diocese of Bath and Wells
