= Abbey Farm House, Yeovil =

Abbey Farm House
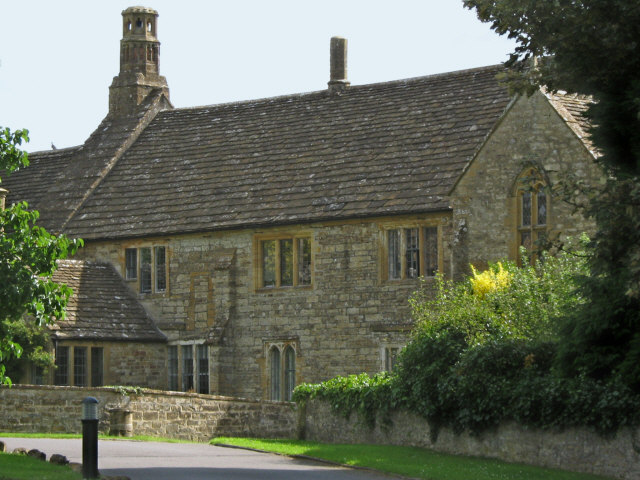

- Location within Somerset
- 50°56′41″N 2°39′20″W
- Location: Yeovil, Somerset, England

History
- Built: c. 1420

Listed Building – Grade I
- Official name: Abbey Farm House
- Designated: 19 March 1951
- Reference no.: 1056512

The Abbey Farm House in Yeovil, Somerset, England was built around 1420 and has been designated as a Grade I listed building.

The Ham stone farmhouse was built by John Stourton (died 1438), also known as 'Jenkyn' Stourton. As part of the manor of Preston Plucknett it was originally known as Preston Great Farm, and has always been in lay-ownership. The addition of "abbey" only occurred in the 19th century for reasons unknown.

It is closely associated with the Abbey Barn which is also Grade I listed.

== See also ==
- List of Grade I listed buildings in South Somerset
