= Church of the Holy Trinity, Wyke Champflower =

Church of the Holy Trinity
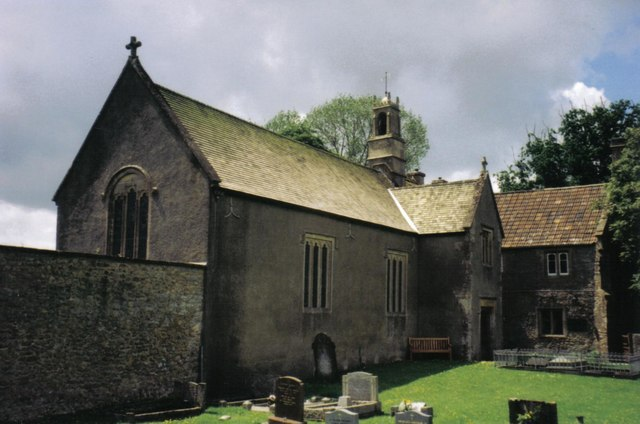

- Location within Somerset
- 51°06′25″N 2°29′03″W
- Location: Wyke Champflower, Bruton, Somerset, England

History
- Built: 1623

Listed Building – Grade I
- Official name: Church of the Holy Trinity
- Designated: 24 March 1961
- Reference no.: 1366339

The Church of the Holy Trinity in Wyke Champflower, Bruton, Somerset, England, dates from 1623 and has been designated as a Grade I listed building.

A wooden tympanum between the nave and chancel bears the 1624 Royal Arms, the arms of the then Bishop of Bath and Wells and the Archbishop of Canterbury. The pews are Jacobean pews and the large stone pulpit Elizabethan. The font cover is from a similar era.

The church contains a black-and-white marble monument commemorating Henry Southworth, who was the Lord of the manor of Wyke, who died in 1625 and funded the construction of the church. In the graveyard is a memorial stone erected in 2002 for Edward Blair Michell (1843–1926) who may be buried there. Michell was a renowned falconer who authored the excellent treatise on falconry "The Art And Practice of Hawking", London 1900. Michell's house is across the road from the church and manor house.

The parish is part of the benefice of Bruton and District which falls within the Bruton and Cary deanery.

== See also ==
- List of Grade I listed buildings in South Somerset
- List of towers in Somerset
