= Manor House, West Coker =

Manor House
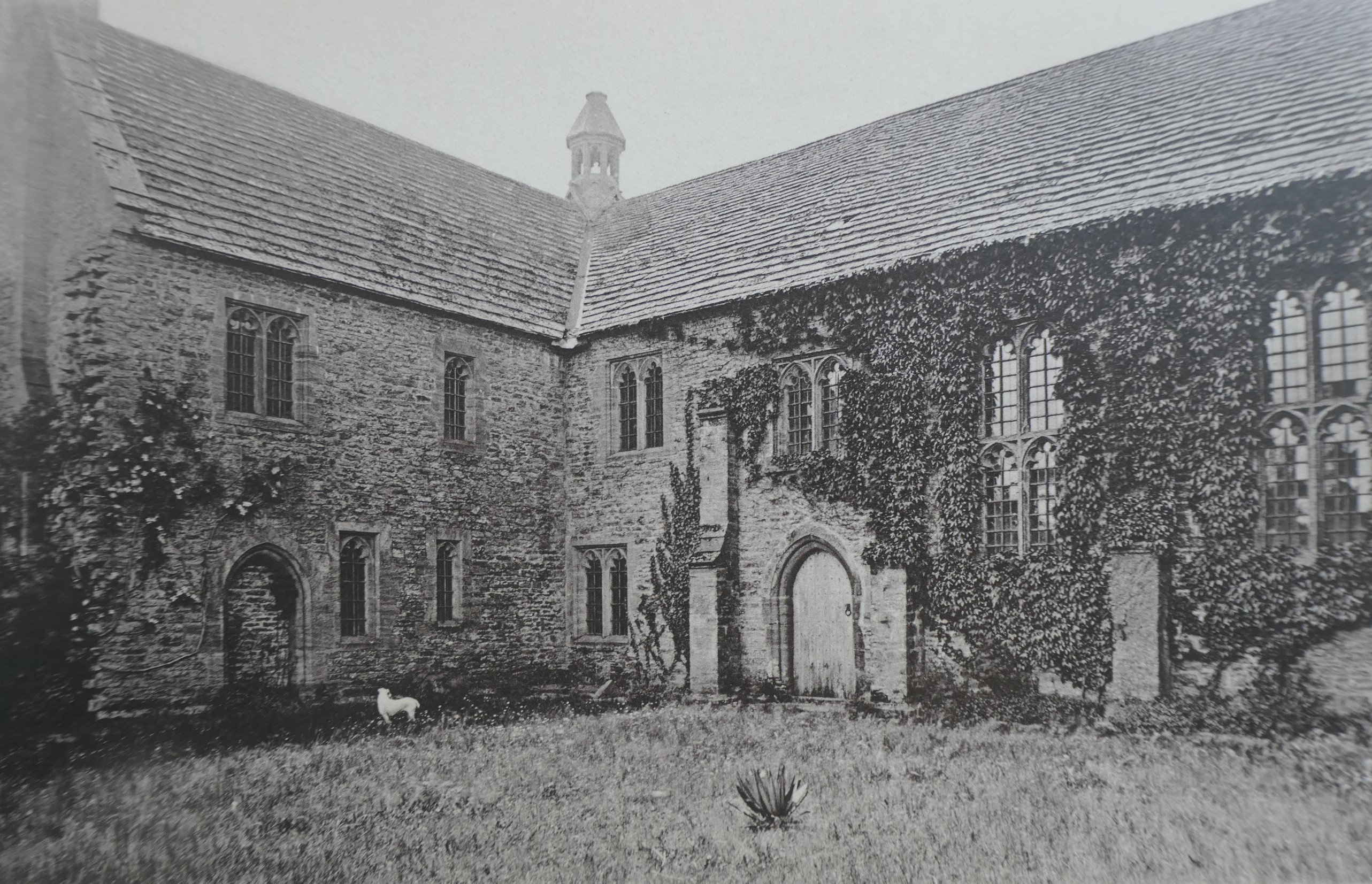
- In 1894

- Location within Somerset
- 50°55′8.8″N 2°41′3.8″W
- Location: West Coker, Somerset, England

History
- Built: c. 1500

Listed Building – Grade I
- Designated: 19 April 1961
- Reference no.: 1345845

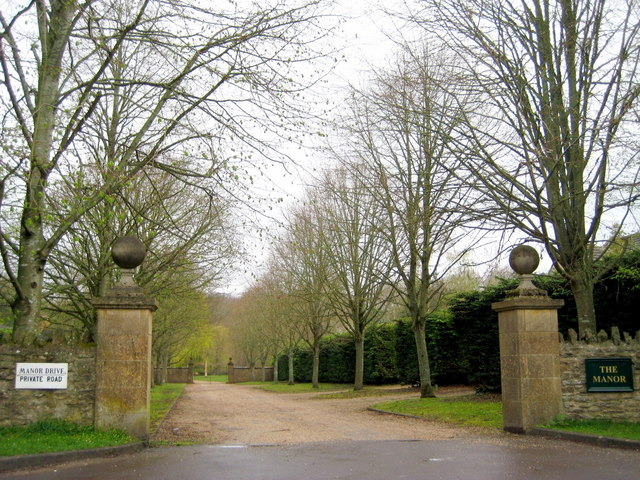
The entrance to the Manor's driveway

The Manor House in West Coker, Somerset, England has medieval origins, however the earliest surviving portions of the current building probably date from around 1500. It has been designated as a Grade I listed building.

== History ==
The earlier manor house on the site, which may have been built around 1308, was destroyed by fire in the 1457, and rebuilt with local Hamstone between 1473 and 1500. The fire was started by an "armed mob" led by the local rector as part of a dispute between local families of the House of Courtenay who were Earls of Devon then led by Thomas de Courtenay, 5th/13th Earl of Devon and the Bonville family led by William Bonville, 1st Baron Bonville.

The house was acquired by the Portman Family of Orchard Portman in 1591 who remodelled it around 1600 and held it until 1829 by which time it was a tenanted farmhouse owned by Edward Portman, 1st Viscount Portman. The house was purchased by an architect, John Moore, in 1866, who carried out various restoration and rebuilding until he died, when the work was continued by his brother and sons.

In 1907 Matthew Nathan, a soldier and colonial administrator, who variously served as the governor of Sierra Leone, Gold Coast, Hong Kong, Natal and Queensland, bought the Manor House. Many politicians and other members of The Establishment visited him at the house. He lived there until his death in 1939. Sir Aston Webb or his son Maurice Webb, rebuilt the South East wing for Nathan in 1910, and the house was profiled by Christopher Hussey in an early edition of Country Life magazine following the renovation and rebuilding. In 1935 Nathan allowed the grounds to be used by local scout groups during the celebrations of the silver jubilee of George V.

== Architecture ==
The two-storey house now has a U-shaped plan following the additions to the original house in the 17th and 20th centuries. The west front is of six bays. Above the porch is the arms of the Portman family. Behind the porch is a screens passage leading to the hall and a staircase to a minstrels' gallery. The hall has an arch braced collar beam trussed roof and a 15th-century fireplace. The Portman Room has a frieze on the plaster ceiling and a heraldic overmantel above the fireplace.

== See also ==
- List of Grade I listed buildings in South Somerset
