= Shepton Beauchamp =

Village and civil parish in Somerset, England

Coordinates: 50.9525°N 2.8504°W

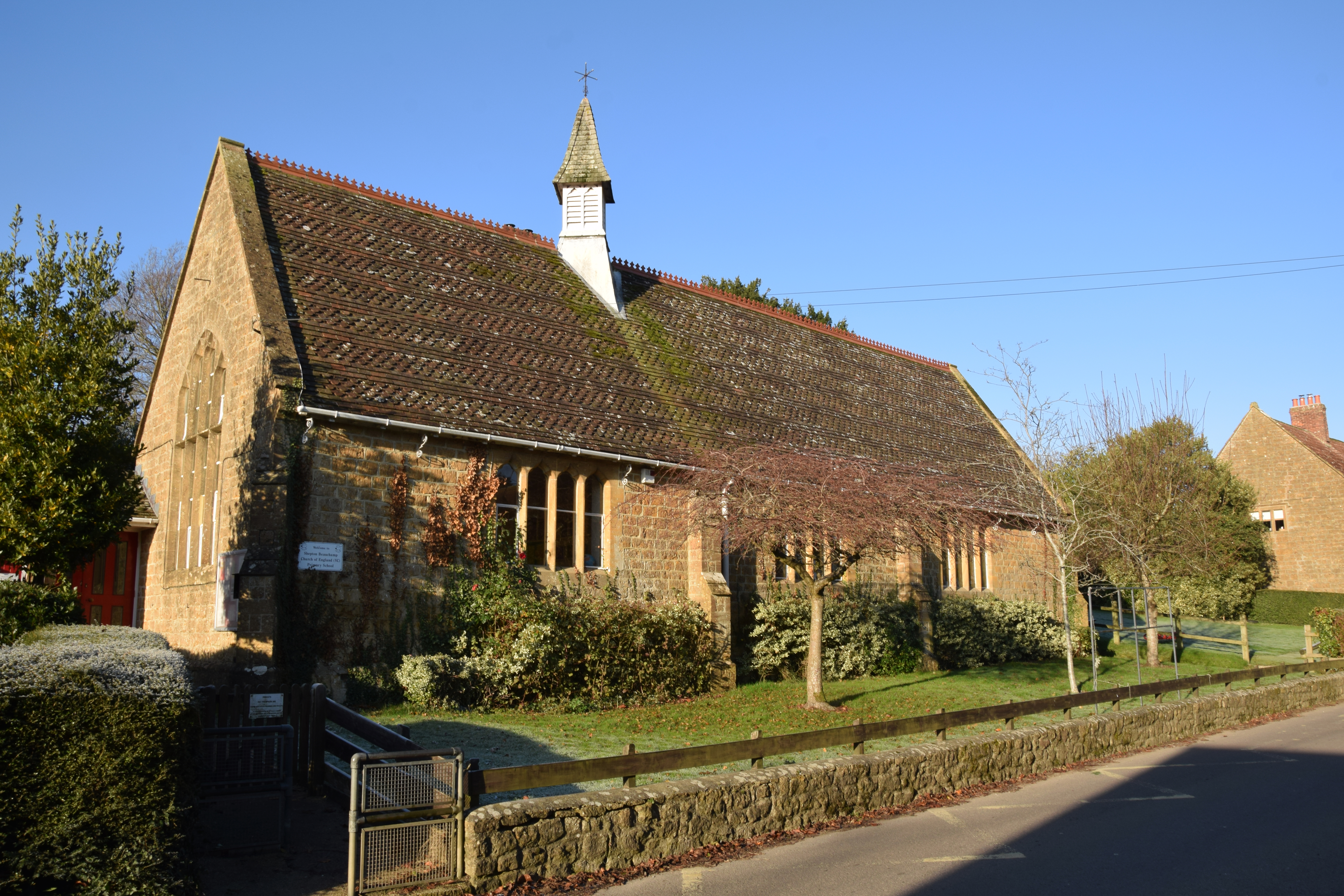
- Village School

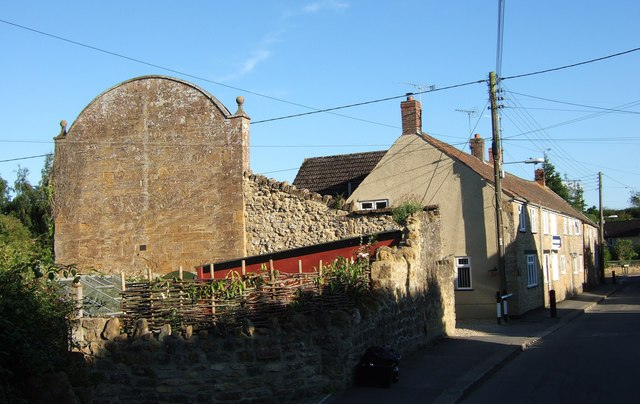
- Grade II listed Fives court wall

- Location within Somerset
- Population: 728 (2011)
- OS grid reference: ST403173
- Civil parish: Shepton Beauchamp
- Unitary authority: Somerset Council
- Ceremonial county: Somerset
- Region: South West
- Country: England
- Sovereign state: United Kingdom
- Post town: ILMINSTER
- Postcode district: TA19
- Dialling code: 01460
- Police: Avon and Somerset
- Fire: Devon and Somerset
- Ambulance: South Western
- UK Parliament: Yeovil

Shepton Beauchamp is a village and civil parish, 1 mile (2 km) from Barrington and 4 miles (6 km) north east of Ilminster between the Blackdown Hills and the Somerset Levels in Somerset, England.

== History ==
The first part of the name of the village has Saxon origins meaning sheep settlement. The second part was added to honour the Beauchamp family (pronounced ‘Beecham’), who held the manor from the mid 12th century. The parish of Shepton Beauchamp was part of the South Petherton Hundred.

It passed to the Seymours in 1361, and Sir John Seymour lived here when High Sheriff of Somerset 1515–16, possibly with his young daughter Jane Seymour, later third Queen of Henry VIII.

In 1755 about half the land was in unenclosed strips, but enclosure by private agreement began in 1807 and was largely complete by 1850.

In 1791 the parish was described as having 85 houses and "lying in a rich, flat and inclosed country". The first census in 1801 recorded the population as 439, and the area of the parish was 836 acres (3.38 km^{2}).

== Governance ==
The parish council has responsibility for local issues, including setting an annual precept (local rate) to cover the council’s operating costs and producing annual accounts for public scrutiny. The parish council evaluates local planning applications and works with the local police, district council officers, and neighbourhood watch groups on matters of crime, security, and traffic. The parish council's role also includes initiating projects for the maintenance and repair of parish facilities, as well as consulting with the district council on the maintenance, repair, and improvement of highways, drainage, footpaths, public transport, and street cleaning. Conservation matters (including trees and listed buildings) and environmental issues are also the responsibility of the council.

For local government purposes, since 1 April 2023, the parish comes under the unitary authority of Somerset Council. Prior to this, it was part of the non-metropolitan district of South Somerset (established under the Local Government Act 1972). It was part of Chard Rural District before 1974.

It is also part of the Yeovil county constituency represented in the House of Commons of the Parliament of the United Kingdom. It elects one Member of Parliament (MP) by the first past the post system of election.

== Church ==
The Church of St Michael, is built of local hamstone, and has 13th-century origins, although it has been extensively changed since then, with major renovation in 1865 by George Edmund Street. It has a tall three-stage tower with set-back buttresses ascending to the shafts of former pinnacles, set off with an embattled parapet and gargoyles. There are two-light traceried bell-chamber windows with stone grilles, continuing as blank openings on the ringing chamber below. There are clocks with Roman numerals to the west and south faces and a higher polygonal stair-turret to the north corner. It has been designated by English Heritage as a Grade I listed building.

The former rectory, now called Beauchamp Manor, was built in 1874 for the rector V.S.S. Coles to house his curates and visitors.

== School ==
The village school caters for children aged 4 to 11 years. It was built in 1856.
