= Church of St Peter, Yeovilton =

Church in Somerset, England

Church of St Peter
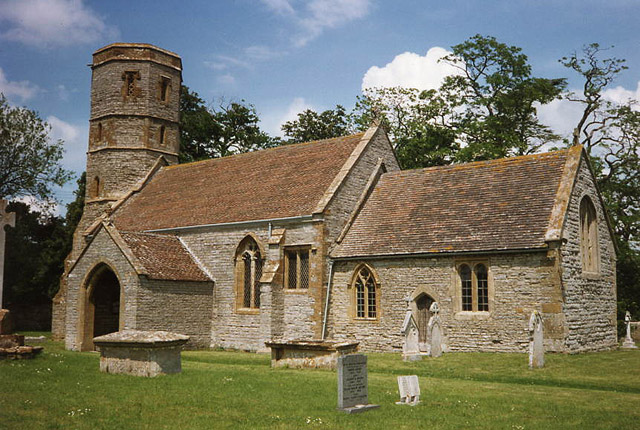

- Location within Somerset
- 51°01′18″N 2°38′57″W
- Location: Podimore, Yeovilton, Somerset, England

History
- Built: 14th century

Listed Building – Grade I
- Designated: 19 April 1961
- Reference no.: 1295400

The Church of St Peter at Podimore in the parish of Yeovilton, Somerset, England, dates from the early 14th century and has been designated as a Grade I listed building.

The church is built on the site of a previous building which is recorded in the Domesday Book from which time it was under the control of Glastonbury Abbey, who held the advowson until the dissolution of the monasteries.

The church has a chancel, nave and west tower. The tower is in four stages, the lowest is square and the others are octagonal. It contains a single bell which was cast in 1633. Survey work was undertaken on the tower in 2012 for future renovation. The chancel arch is probably the oldest part of the building.

The interior includes altar rails dating from the late 17th century and fragments of glass in the east window which date from the 1490s. There are also traces of wall paintings.

The Anglican parish of Yeovilton with Podimore is part of the benefice of Ilchester with Northover and Limington within the archdeaconry of Wells.

== See also ==
- List of Grade I listed buildings in South Somerset
- List of towers in Somerset
- List of ecclesiastical parishes in the Diocese of Bath and Wells
- see its churchyard cross on the map of medieval crosses in the area

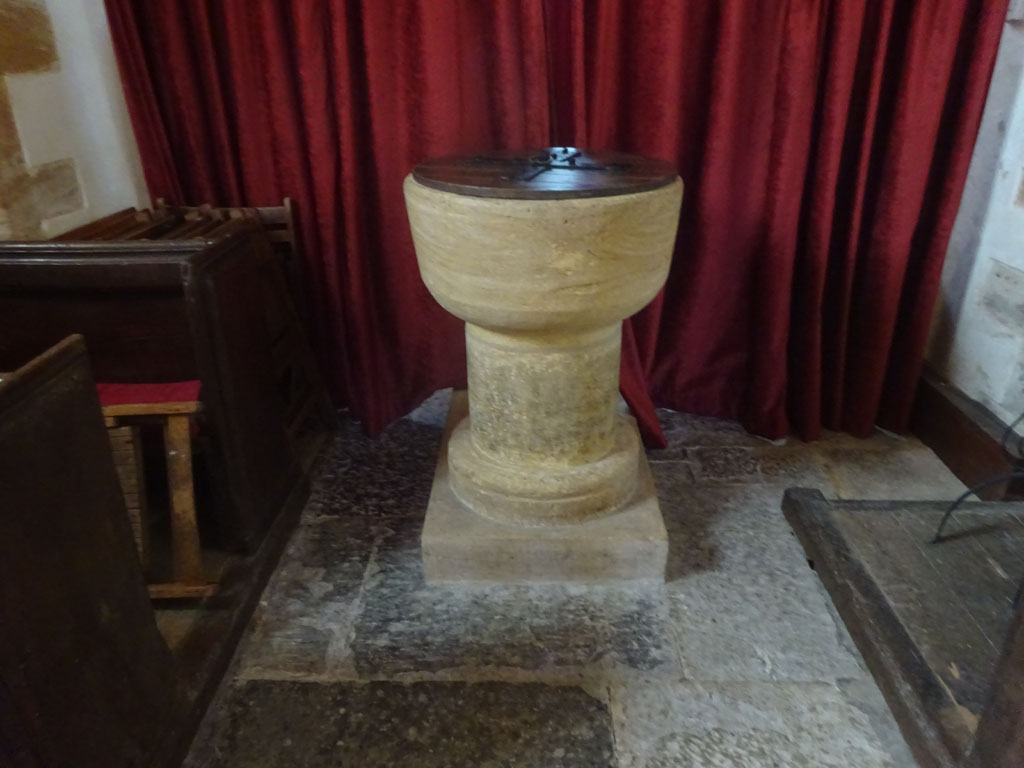
the font
