= Stavordale Priory =

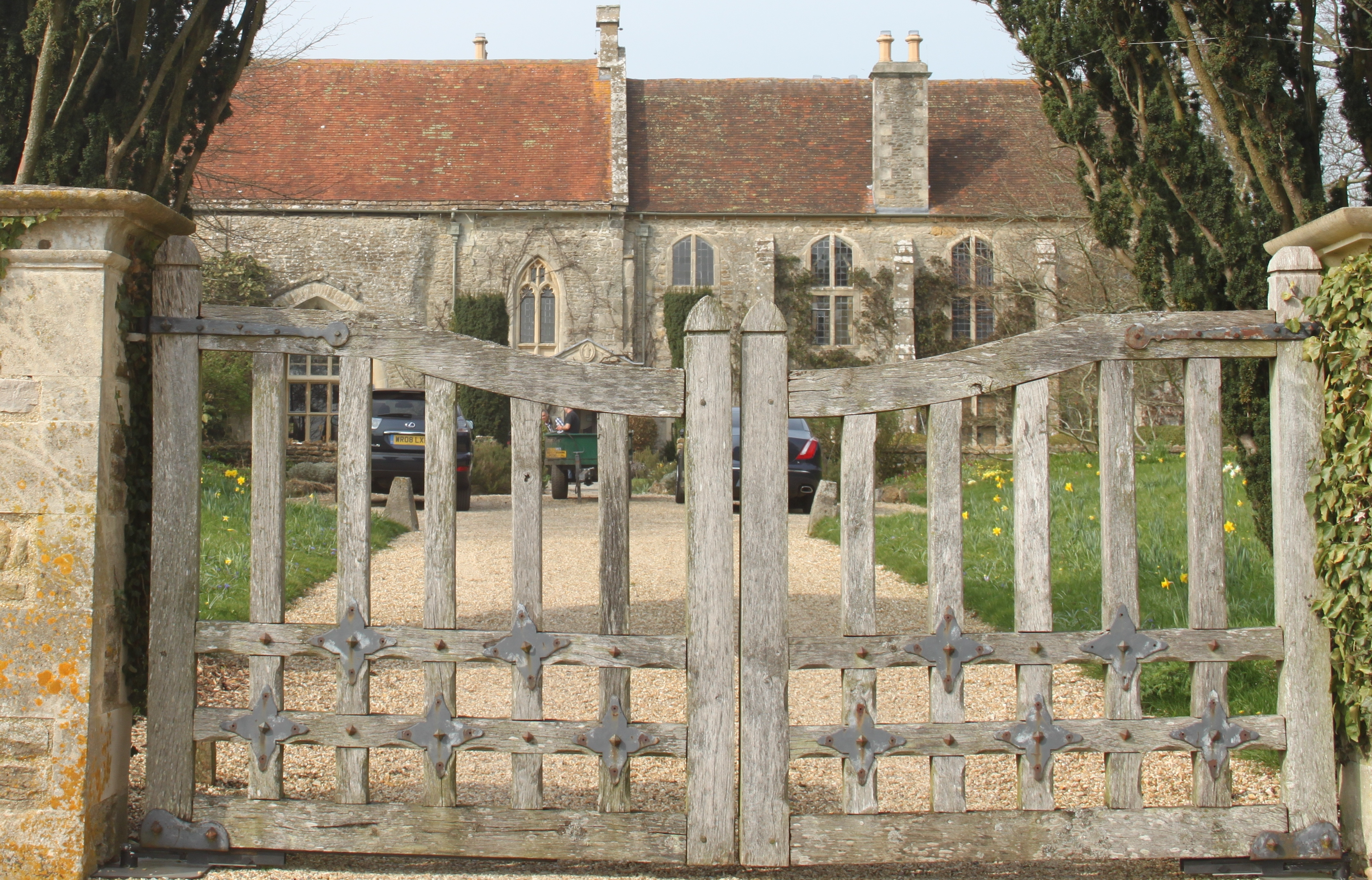

- Location within Somerset
- 51°05′12″N 2°22′35″W
- Location: Charlton Musgrove, Somerset, England

History
- Built: 13th century

Listed Building – Grade I
- Official name: Stavordale Priory
- Designated: 24 March 1961
- Reference no.: 1176699

Stavordale Priory near Charlton Musgrove, Somerset, England was built as a priory of Augustinian canons in the 13th century and was converted into a private residence after the suppression of the monastery in 1538. It has been designated as a Grade I listed building.

The original priory for Augustinian canons was founded by a member of the Lovel family, in 1243, probably following an endowment by Henry, Lord Lovel, who died about 1199.

The list of Augustinian Priors of Stavordale Priory includes one 'John' Bodman who died there, as Prior, in 1361. Closer examination of the (Latin) primary source for this reference, however, reveals that his name was not, in fact, given as the English form 'John' but Johannis, the Latin form of Johannes. This appears to be the earliest historical record in England of a Johannes Bodman, and it is possible that he was a scion of the ancient, noble house of the Ritter von Bodman (also Freiherren and Grafen von und zu Bodman), who lived then and still live today at Bodman am Bodensee. However the name 'Johannis' is the Latin form for 'John' as well as 'Johannes' and there is little reason to create a German link to the Prior.

The bell tower is known to have existed by 1374, and the church was refitted and rebuilt around 1439. The chantry of Jesus was described as having been "recently completed" in 1526. It is thought to be linked to the village's old church near the altar by a tunnel, perhaps used as a priest's escape route, some two miles in length. Again there is no evidence or reason for such a 'tunnel' escape route.

It was converted around the time of the dissolution of the monasteries, after the priory merged with Taunton in 1533.

It was restored and extended by Thomas Edward Collcutt in 1905 for Mr. F.G. Sage.

It is now owned by Sir Cameron Mackintosh, a British theatrical producer notable for his association with many commercially successful musicals. The gardens of Stavordale Priory were featured in the 2017 book The Secret Gardeners by Victoria Summerley and photographer Hugo Rittson Thomas.

== Burials ==
- John Stourton (died 1438) and his father John Stourton and his grandfather Sir William Stourton

== Other Uses of the Name ==
Stavordale is the surname given to Emmeline Mowbray's mother in Charlotte Smith's novel Emmeline.

== See also ==
- List of Grade I listed buildings in South Somerset
