= Hymerford House =

- Grove Farm
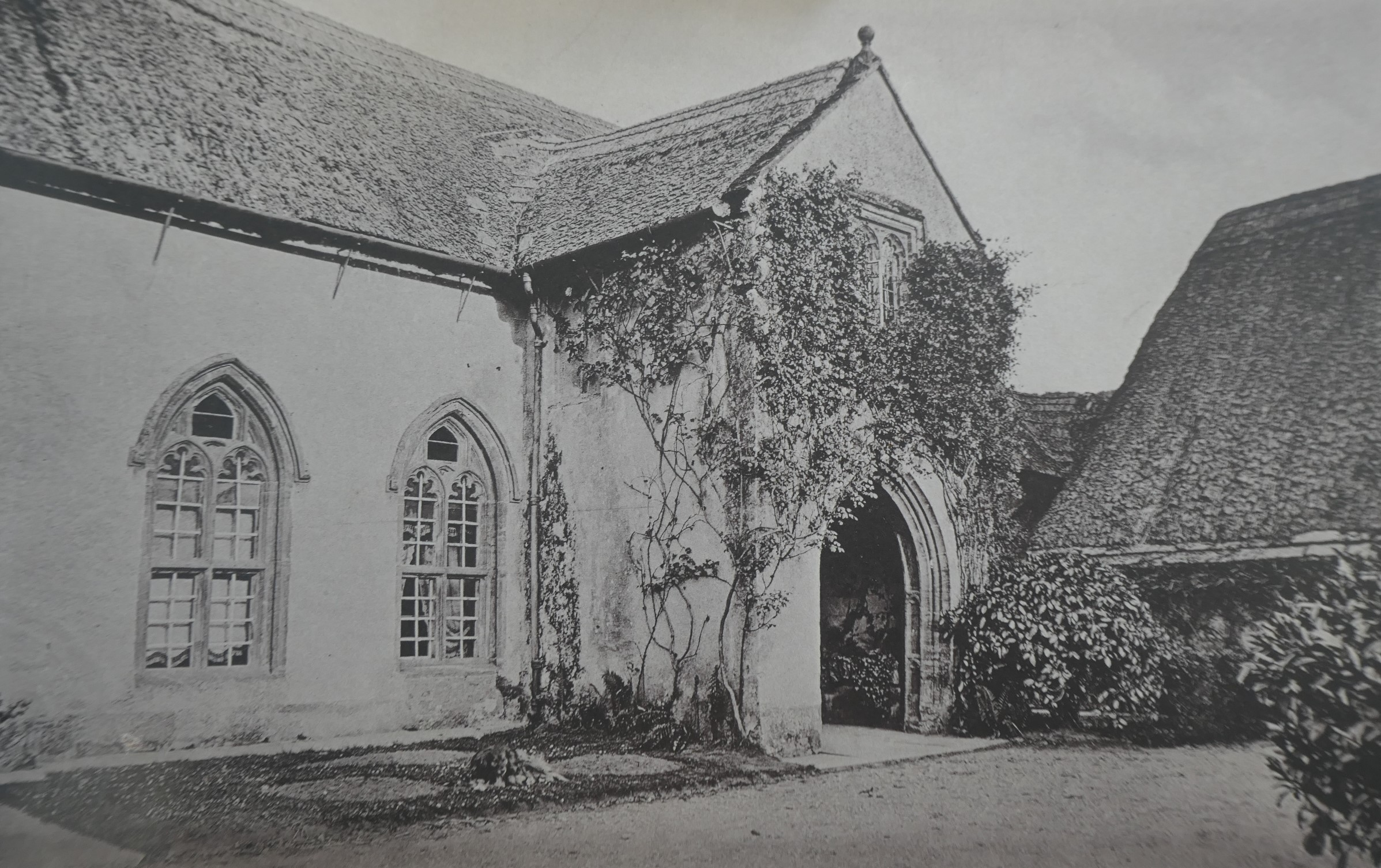
- Hymerford House

- Location within Somerset
- 50°55′07″N 2°39′04″W
- Location: East Coker, Somerset, England

History
- Built: 15th century

Listed Building – Grade I
- Official name: Hymerford House
- Designated: 19 April 1961
- Reference no.: 1057157

Hymerford House (which has also been known as Grove Farm, Manor House and Bridge Farm) in East Coker, Somerset, England was built in the 15th century and it has been designated as a Grade I listed building.

The original hall house was built of local stone with hamstone dressing and the walls are rendered. In the 16th century the house was altered with the addition of porches to the front and back. The west front is of six bays. Attached to the house is the 18th-century Grove Cottage. In the grounds is a 19th-century sheep dip.

The sailor and explorer William Dampier was born in the house in 1651.

== See also ==
- List of Grade I listed buildings in South Somerset
