= St Vincent's Church, Ashington =

Church in Somerset, England

Church of St Vincent
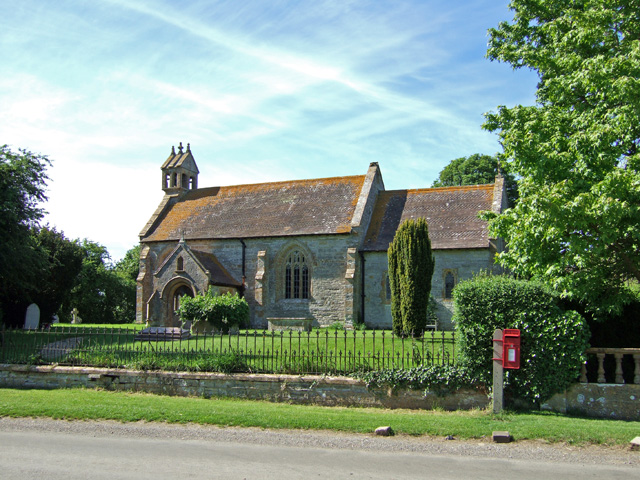

- Location within Somerset
- 50°59′38″N 2°37′32″W
- Location: Ashington, Chilton Cantelo, Somerset, England

History
- Built: 13th century

Listed Building – Grade I
- Designated: 19 April 1961
- Reference no.: 1345984

The Anglican Church of St Vincent at Ashington in the civil parish of Chilton Cantelo, Somerset, England, is from the 13th century. It has been designated as a Grade I listed building.

The church was built of local stone with Hamstone dressings and has a clay tile roof. It is a small two-cell church with a nave, supported by offset buttresses and a chancel which underwent Victorian restoration. The western bell turret was added after the construction of the church.

The interior includes Jacobean furnishings. There are box pews and a pulpit with a tester from the 17th century. The baptismal font is octagonal.

The parish is within the benefice of Chilton Cantelo, Ashington, Mudford, Rimpton and Marston Magna within the deanery of Yeovil.

== See also ==
- Grade I listed buildings in South Somerset
- List of Somerset towers
- List of ecclesiastical parishes in the Diocese of Bath and Wells
