= Shanks House =

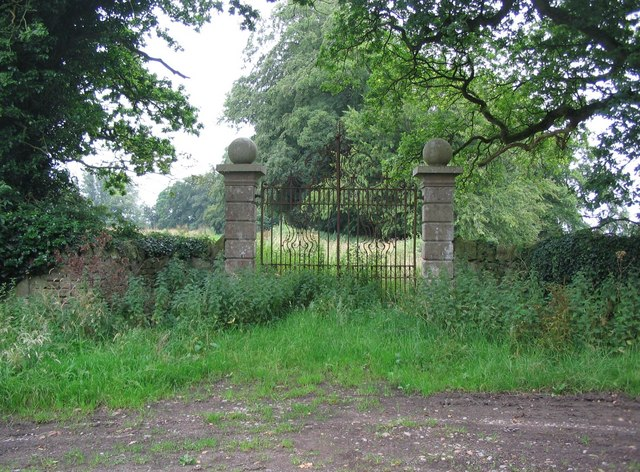
- The gates to Shanks House

- Location within Somerset
- 51°02′19″N 2°21′11″W
- Location: Cucklington, Somerset, England

History
- Built: 17th century

Listed Building – Grade I
- Designated: 24 March 1961
- Reference no.: 1222369

Shanks House in Cucklington, Somerset, England is a Grade I listed building.

The first written records of the house date from the middle of the 16th century. In 1546 the house and 50 acres (20 ha) of land was sold to Robert Kemys, whose descendants sold it to the Watts family who held it until it passed into the Grant-Dalton family by marriage and through generations of descendants until the 20th century.

During the 20th century it has been owned by the Sutton and Morley families

The two-story house with attics underwent major works in the 17th and 18th centuries, including refitting by Nathaniel Ireson.

== See also ==
- List of Grade I listed buildings in South Somerset
