= Ven House =

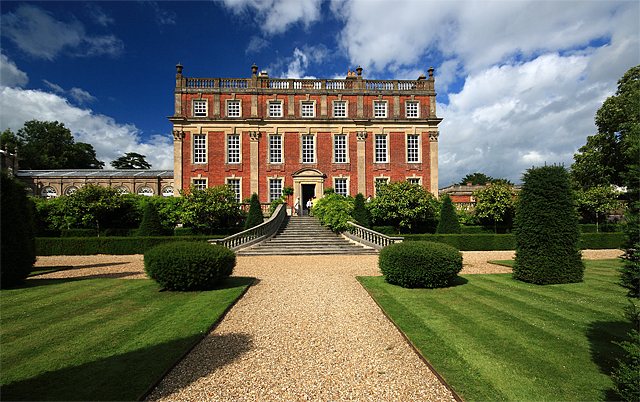

- Location within Somerset
- 50°57′49″N 2°27′18″W
- Location: Milborne Port, Somerset, England

Listed Building – Grade I
- Designated: 24 March 1961
- Reference no.: 1056286

Ven House in Milborne Port, Somerset, England is an English manor house and a Grade I listed building.

== History ==
A hamlet of Ven or Fenn existed in the mid-thirteenth century. By the sixteenth century the manor belonged to the Carent family, who sold it to Sir Edward Carteret in 1679. When Sir Edward died, his son, Sir Charles Carteret, mortgaged the property to the Londoner Thomas Medlycott and subsequently sold it to Thomas' brother, James.(Victoria County History, Somerset, 1999)

Construction of a smaller William and Mary style house, was completed in 1698–1700; the house was enlarged around 1725–30 (Note: ca 1725 is the date given in Howard Colvin, A Biographical Dictionary of British Architects, 1600-1840, 3rd ed. (Yale University Press) 1995, s.v. "Ireson, Nathaniel".) for James Medlycott (Note: The baronetcy of Medleycoot, of Ven House, was created in 1808.) by Nathaniel Ireson, who retained the west front of the earlier house. It stands on an artificially raised terrace, and is surrounded by grounds that were laid out at the time by Richard Grange. It was altered and extended by Thomas Cubitt and Decimus Burton in 1835–36.

The house passed through the Medlycot family through the 18th and 19th centuries, until they sold much of the estate between 1918 and 1925. The house itself was let to a succession of tenants until Sir Hubert Mervyn Medlycot sold it in 1957. The house has changed hands four times since 1993, and, in 2006, had a guide price of £8.5m. In 2013 the house was sold to Charles Lamb Allen, Baron Allen of Kensington and his partner, Mike Fisher.

== Architecture ==
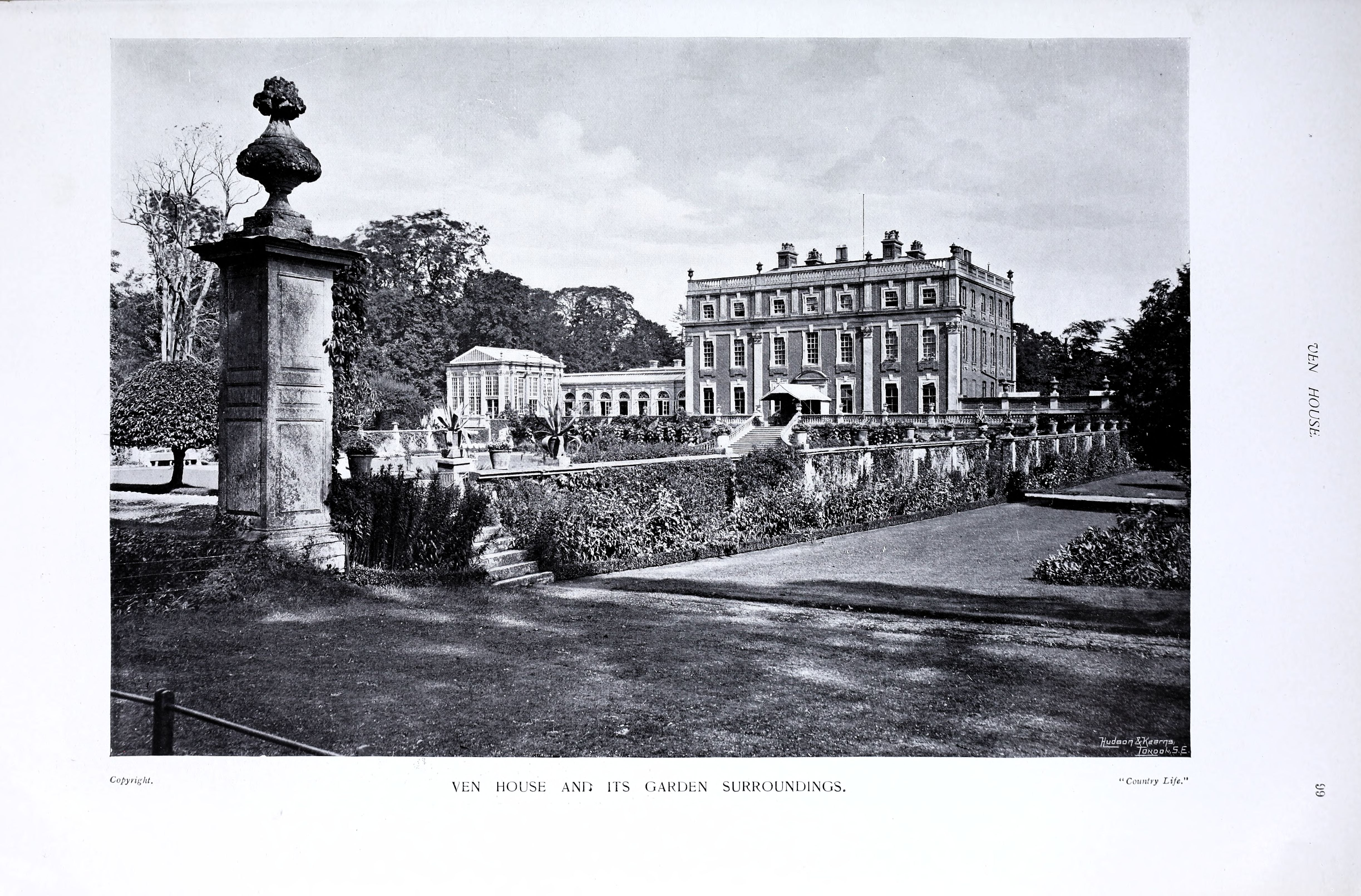
Gardens Old and New Vol 1 Ven House

The house, which has a rectangular plan of 7 bays by 5 bays, is built of red brick in Flemish bond, with local Ham stone dressings. The north and south fronts are divided by two giant Corinthian pilasters, placed to suggest a central block of three bays. The roof is hipped with Welsh slate behind balustraded parapets. Attached to the house and in matching style were north west and north east pavilions. Along the south side of the house is a terrace balustraded to match the house.

When the house was first built the main entrance gateway was some 400 metres (1,300 ft) to the north of the house and linked East Street and The Old Road (Dorset), In the 19th century this was superseded by London Road, which split much of the parkland from the house, and the Ham stone gate piers and wrought iron gate were relocated to their current position 35 metres (115 ft) north west of the house.

The 1836 building work by Decimus Burton, which provided a new drawing-room for Sir W. Medleycott (Note: Drawings by Burton at Ven House, seen in 1967 by Howard Colvin, noted in Colvin, A Biographical Dictionary of British Architects, 1660-1840 3rd ed. (Yale University Press) 1995, s.v. "Burton, Decimus".) included the construction of the corridor linking Ven House and the Orangery, and the Orangery itself. Also constructed around 1836 were the stabling and several other outbuildings, which are attached to east side of the house.

=== Historic listing designations ===
The Ven estate contains a total of 12 listed buildings, eight listed at the highest grade, I, and four listed at Grade II. The structures listed at Grade I are: the house, the orangery, and a corridor linking the two; the entrance gates, two pavilions and walling to the north-west and north-east; and a garden terrace and stables to the east. The structures listed at Grade II are: two sets of garden walls, a bridge and a garden seat.

== Gardens and park ==
The house originally had around 70 hectares (170 acres) of land including 6 hectares (15 acres) of formal gardens and pleasure grounds, and around 64 hectares (160 acres) of parkland. They were originally laid out by Richard Grange between 1720 and 1739. The house still has almost 14 hectares (35 acres) of gardens and grounds, including a stream which forms part of the River Yeo. To the south east of the house is a walled garden which was a kitchen garden or plant nursery, but is now largely ornamental. It is surrounded by red brick walls approximately 4 metres (13 ft) high.

The remnants of the early 18th-century formal gardens and formal park landscape have been designated Grade II in the South Somerset Register of Historic Parks and Gardens and Register of Historic Parks and Gardens of special historic interest in England.

== See also ==
- List of Grade I listed buildings in South Somerset
