= Earnshill House =

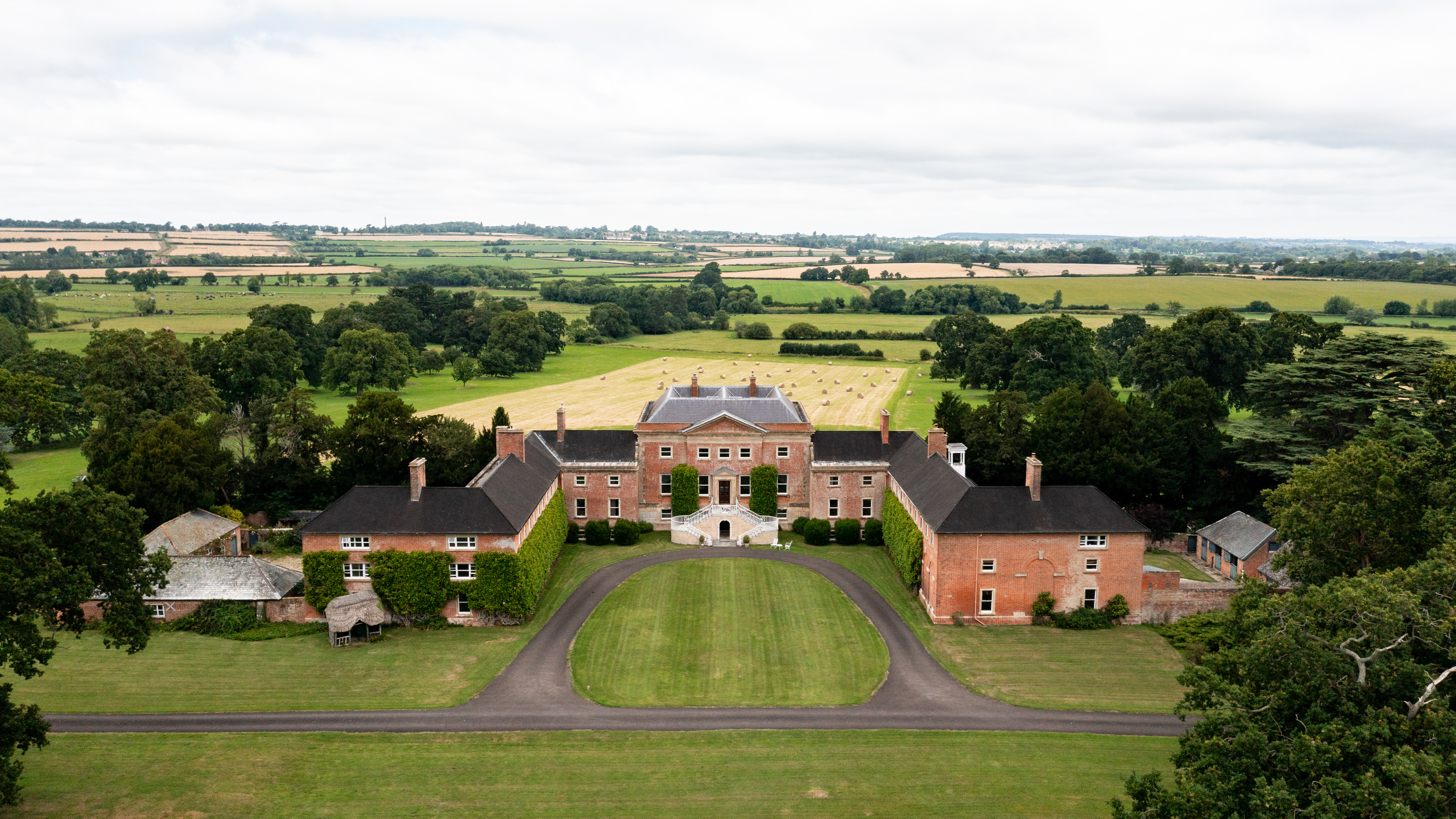
- Earnshill House

- Location within Somerset
- 50°59′31″N 2°52′37″W
- Location: Curry Rivel, Somerset, England

History
- Built: 1725

Site notes
- Architect: Colen Campbell
- Architectural style: Palladian

Listed Building – Grade I
- Designated: 17 April 1959
- Reference no.: 1249217

Earnshill House in Hambridge, near Curry Rivel, Somerset, England is a grand Georgian manor house, set in parkland. It has been designated as a Grade I listed building.

== History ==
The manor of Earnshill was owned by Muchelney Abbey until the dissolution of the monasteries and then became the property of the Jennings family. Francis Eyles Esq a director of the South Sea Company bought the Estate in 1728. He then embarked on building his country villa, the current center portion of the house. After his death in 1750 the Estate and villa fell to his brother Edward Eyles. Henry Combe was an influential Bristol merchant and a member of the Society of Merchant Venturers and later mayor of the city. His son Richard Combe (MP), an MP with political ambitions, bought the Earnshill estate in 1758. Shortly after the purchase of Earnshill he built the substantial east and west wings of the house, walled garden and Earnshill Farm with its Grade II listed barn.

During World War II the house was used for children evacuated from Durlston Court School that was in Dorset at the time but now in Hampshire.

The Estate has been passed on through the Combe family for seven generations and is now owned by Nicholas Combe.

== Architecture ==
The entrance is of five bays with projecting wings on either side. The house is built of brick with Hamstone dressings in a Palladian style.

The outside of the house includes a walled garden as part of a wider area of parkland, with substantial gatepiers at the entrance to the drive. There was also an attached farm with a brick barn. In the surrounding woodland was a four-pipe duck decoy with nine shooting positions.

== Tennis and croquet at Earnshill ==
Major Walter Clopton Wingfield, a first cousin of the Combe's spent much of his time at Earnshill. Walter Wingfield is the man who invented lawn tennis, receiving the patent in 1874 from Queen Victoria. The oval croquet lawn where Walter Wingfield developed and tested his invention is center stage at the entrance of the house. It is here where Olive Combe perfected the game of croquet becoming the three times ladies singles North England Champion and who in 1898 won the Woman Singles Croquet Championship at the All England Lawn Tennis and Croquet Club (AELTC) at Wimbledon.

When Walter died in 1912 he left his estate to his first cousin Constance Combe along with the lawn tennis patent signed by Queen Victoria, and all of his possessions. Constance lived her whole life at Earnshill and never married. His uniform and patent can be seen at the International Tennis Hall of Fame in Rhode Island. Walter is also on display at The All England Lawn Tennis and Croquet Club museum. The Centre Court restaurant at Wimbledon is named after him in his honour. His magnificent portrait hangs above the ornate fireplace at Earnshill along with Olive Combe’s Wimbledon trophy, from when she won the Singles Croquet Championship.

== See also ==
- List of Grade I listed buildings in South Somerset
