= Beercrocombe =

Village in Somerset, England

Coordinates: 50.9796°N 2.9659°W

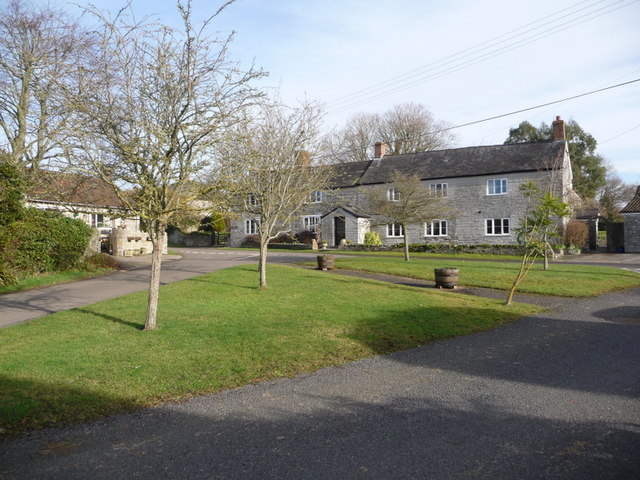
- Near the main road junction

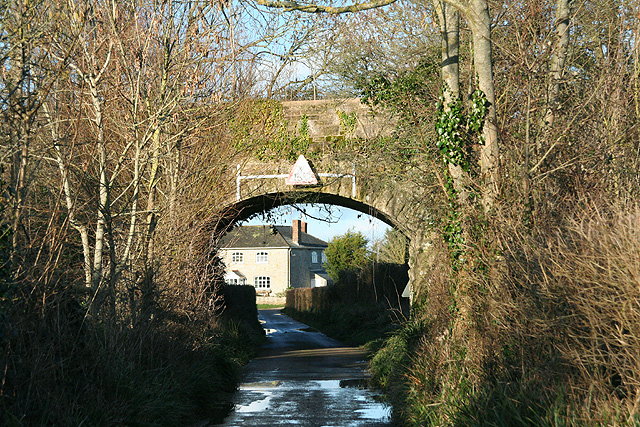
- Railway bridge

- Location within Somerset
- Population: 134 (2011)
- OS grid reference: ST322204
- Unitary authority: Somerset Council
- Ceremonial county: Somerset
- Region: South West
- Country: England
- Sovereign state: United Kingdom
- Post town: TAUNTON
- Postcode district: TA3
- Police: Avon and Somerset
- Fire: Devon and Somerset
- Ambulance: South Western
- UK Parliament: Glastonbury and Somerton

Beercrocombe (also known as Beer Crocombe) is a village and civil parish in Somerset, England, 1 mile (1.6 km) south of Curry Mallet and 7 miles (11.3 km) southeast of Taunton. The village has a population of 134.

== History ==
The village is included in the Domesday Book under its old name Bere, which is from the Old English for pasture or possibly grove. The second part of the name comes from Godfrey de Craucombe (of Crowcombe) who was the lord of the manor in 1227.

From 1402 John Harwell was the Lord of the manor.

Beer Crocombe was part of the hundred of Abdick and Bulstone.

From 1746 to 1751 the preacher John Wesley was a frequent visitor to the village.

Beer Farm in Beer Street dates from around 1600 and is grade II* listed.

== Governance ==
The parish council has responsibility for local issues, including setting an annual precept (local rate) to cover the council's operating costs and producing annual accounts for public scrutiny. The parish council evaluates local planning applications and works with the local police, district council officers, and neighbourhood watch groups on matters of crime, security, and traffic. The parish council's role also includes initiating projects for the maintenance and repair of parish facilities, as well as consulting with the district council on the maintenance, repair, and improvement of highways, drainage, footpaths, public transport, and street cleaning. Conservation matters (including trees and listed buildings) and environmental issues are also the responsibility of the council.

For local government purposes, since 1 April 2023, the village comes under the unitary authority of Somerset Council. Prior to this, it was part of the non-metropolitan district of South Somerset, which was formed on 1 April 1974 under the Local Government Act 1972, having previously been part of Langport Rural District.

It is also part of a county constituency, Glastonbury and Somerton, represented in the House of Commons of the Parliament of the United Kingdom. It elects one Member of Parliament (MP) by the first past the post system of election. It was part of the South West England constituency of the European Parliament prior to Britain leaving the European Union in January 2020, which elected seven MEPs using the d'Hondt method of party-list proportional representation.

== Religious sites ==
The Anglican parish Church of St James dates from the 13th century but the current building is predominantly from the 15th. It was restored in the late 19th century. It has been designated as a Grade I listed building.
