= Newton Surmaville =

Country house in Somerset, England

Coordinates: 50°56′05″N 2°37′00″W

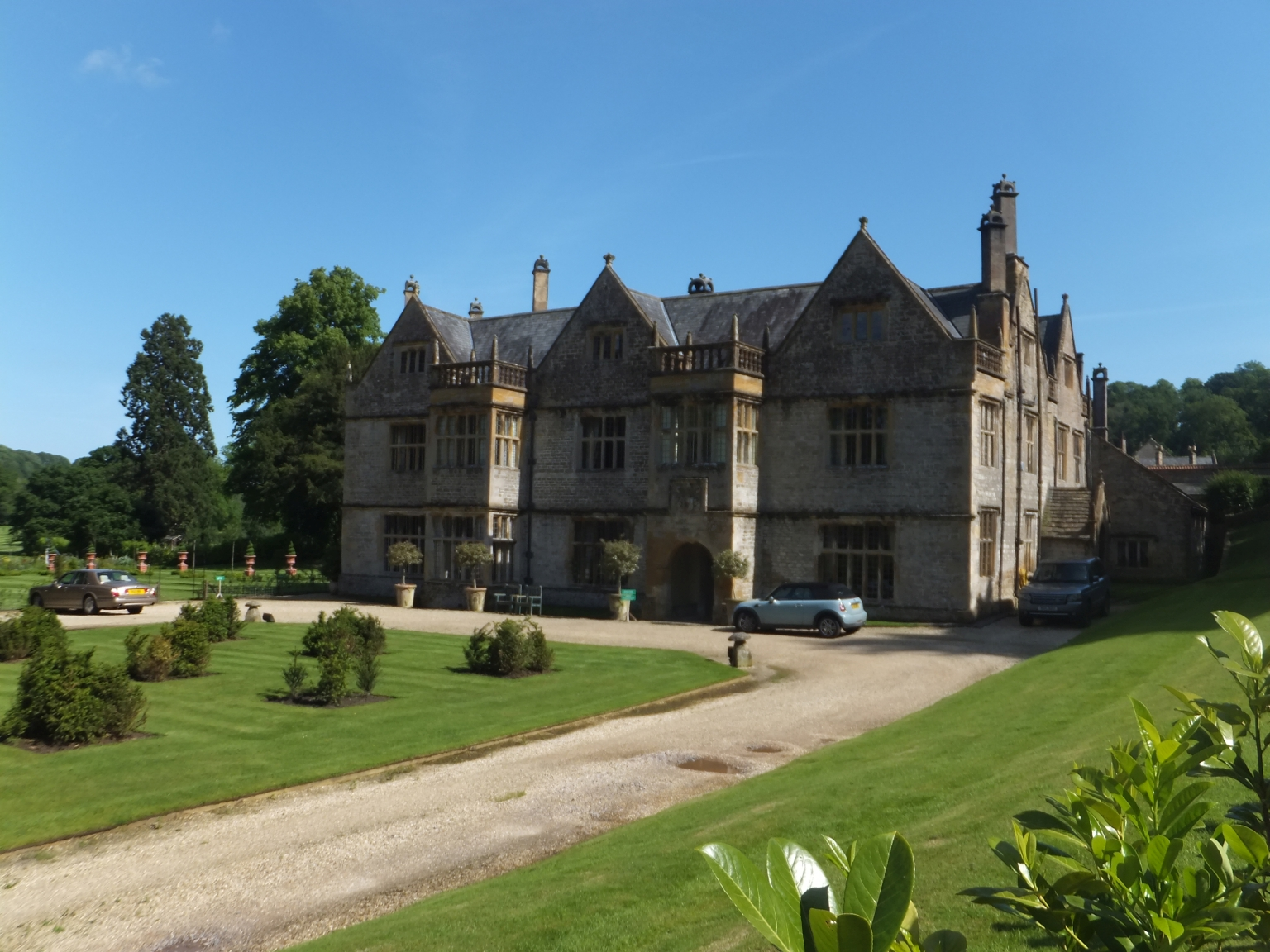
- Interactive map of the Newton Surmaville area

General information
- Location: Yeovil, England
- Construction started: 1608
- Completed: 1612
- Client: Robert Harbin

Website
- www.newtonsurmaville.co.uk

Newton Surmaville is a 15,129-square-foot (1,405.5 m^{2}) stately home with gardens and a park south of Yeovil, Somerset in the district of South Somerset, in England. It lies just outside the town in the parish of Barwick.

== House ==
Newton Surmaville House in the nineteenth century

The house, which is also known as Newton House, was built between 1608 and 1612, on the site of an earlier building, originally owned by the Norman de Salmonville family from the 1200s. The site was purchased by clothier Robert Harbin, who arranged to have the house removed and the new building erected.

The mansion was extensively altered and enhanced in the 1870s; at the time, it still contained much of its original furniture and an eclectic library of many thousands of volumes. There were also 17th-century tapestries, portraying scenes of "Elijah Rising into Heaven and the Melting of the Golden Calf" in sculpted gold frames, and collections of antique pewter and pistols and swords. Some of the contents were given to the Museum of Somerset, the Somerset Military Museum and auctioned at Sothebys in London.

It has been designated by English Heritage as a Grade I listed building. The Surmaville part of the name comes from the de Salmonville family.

A 2007 report stated that there were various outbuildings including the stables, gardeners cottage, and barn.

Historic England offered this overview of the mansion in a report updated in 2014:

Newton Surmaville, also known as Newton House (listed Grade I) ... stands on an artificially-levelled terrace slightly above the flood plain of the River Yeo towards the centre of the site. The house comprises two storeys and an attic, and is constructed of Ham stone with ashlar dressings under principally pitched slate roofs, and is lit by mullion and transom windows. The entrance façade (north) has a symmetrical composition with three full-height gables and a pair of two-storey square bays surmounted by balustrades and obelisk finials. The north-west bay contains the principal entrance. The other facades are less regular in style, but have similar gables with tall stone chimney stacks and obelisk finials. To the south a paved courtyard separates the house from the C19 stables, service buildings and kitchen garden.

The home was purchased in 2007 by Robin and Jane Cannon who also bought an additional 60 acres, forty near the house and another twenty across the river in Dorset.

Over the subsequent years, it was extensively renovated and updated; a new heating system was installed and the black walls were painted in colourful tones. The gardens were also improved and expanded. A report with photographs in 2019 stated that the Newton House provided over 15,000 square ft of living space; the property also included a renovated three-bedroom gardener's cottage that was rented to holiday-makers, two large garages and several outbuildings that housed a gin manufacturing business.

== Grounds ==
The gardens and pleasure grounds cover around two hectares, and slope down to the River Yeo. They were laid out in the mid 18th century, with further landscaping in the 19th. The pleasure gardens included five ponds, a boathouse, a curving lime avenue canter, a walled kitchen garden, a rose garden and herbaceous borders to the east of the pond accessed via circa 1700 gates. The summerhouse dates from 1750, and was built as a 3-storey octagon with 2-storey flanking wings. It has since been converted into a holiday-let cottage.

In 2014, work was done on the kitchen garden near the cottage and cultivation of the area was started again. A map of the grounds, published by Historic England in 2018, (ST 56721 15287), confirms an extensive garden/park area. The grounds are listed, Grade II, on the Register of Historic Parks and Gardens of special historic interest in England.

The original design of the grounds is described in the memoirs "The Revd George Harbin and his memoirs of gardening 1716–1723".
