= Church of St Mary the Virgin, East Stoke =

Church in Somerset, England

Church of St Mary the Virgin
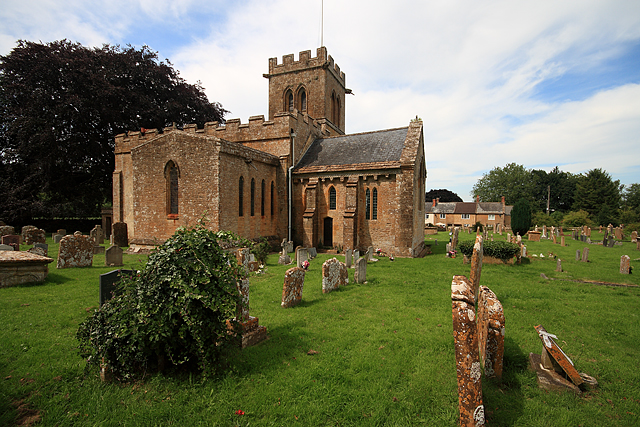

- Location within Somerset
- 50°57′07″N 2°44′07″W
- Location: East Stoke, Stoke-sub-Hamdon, Somerset, England

History
- Built: 12th century

Listed Building – Grade I
- Designated: 19 April 1961
- Reference no.: 1260420

The Church of St Mary the Virgin at East Stoke in Stoke-sub-Hamdon, Somerset, England dates from the 12th century. It has been designated as a Grade I listed building. It was previously dedicated to Saint Denis.

Much of the church, including the nave and chancel with their stone carving are Norman, the structure being supported by pilaster buttresses. The north transept was added about 1225 and the south transept about 1300.

The church has a tower with six bells. It shows various medieval carving including abstract corbels, an astrological tympanum, and St Michael slaying the dragon. Two of the carvings are thought to be Sheela na Gigs. The upper part of the tower was built in the 13th century with the parapet being added in the 15th.

The church was restored in 1862, by Benjamin Ferrey.

The parish is within the benefice of Stoke-sub-Hamdon, which is part of the Wells archdeaconry.

Two of the Grade II* listed 17th-century monuments in the churchyard have suffered from subsidence and as a result rising damp has caused salt crystallisation which is affecting the inscriptions. As a result, they have been added to the Heritage at Risk Register.

== See also ==
- List of Grade I listed buildings in South Somerset
- List of towers in Somerset
- List of ecclesiastical parishes in the Diocese of Bath and Wells
