= The Abbey, Charlton Adam =

The Abbey
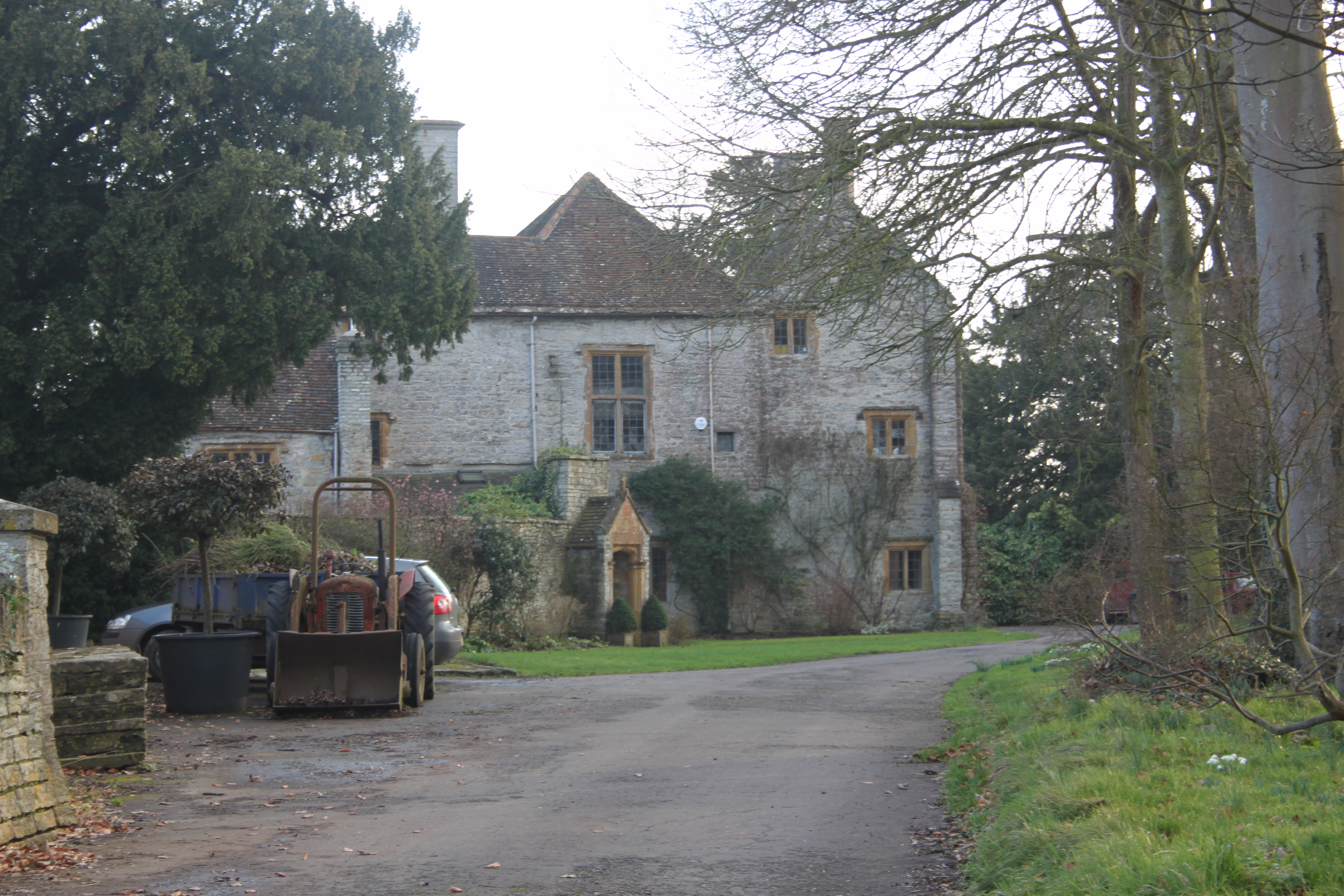
- Interactive map of the The Abbey area

General information
- Location: Charlton Mackrell, England
- Coordinates: 51°3′21″N 2°39′52″W
- Completed: late 16th century

The Abbey is a Grade I listed building in Somerset, England. Built on the site of a 12th-century chapel, which might be incorporated in fragments, the main building dates to the 16th century.

== Building ==
The building is constructed from roughly cut blue lias, dressed with ham stone. The roof is clay tiles, with octagonal ashlar chimneystacks and rubble stone chimneystacks. The majority of the house is two storey high, with a three-story block at the end. The entrance is through a 20th-century porch.

Inside there is pre-Reformation work with Elizabethan paneling. The ceilings are beamed with exposed joists. The fireplaces throughout the house are moulded cambered arches, whilst the drawing room's fireplace has an oak overmantel Above the drawing room was a room known as the 'great chamber' which would have occupied the entire upper floor before being partitioned. The Abbey was designated a Grade I listed building on 17 April 1959.

== History ==
The building was a large rectory house, described as a mansion in 1549. The house had become known as 'Abbey Farm' by 1849 and took its name from the fact that it was the site of the Chantry Chapel of the Holy Spirit, founded in 1237, of which some fragments may be incorporated; however the building has never been an abbey.

It underwent extensive restoration and rebuilding in the late 16th century. The house was restored again in 1902 for Claude Neville of Butleigh Court, probably by C.E. Ponting, who also restored Lytes Cary in the same parish. The northern part of the house was damaged by fire in the 1960s and plainly restored.
