= South Cadbury =

Village in Somerset, England

Coordinates: 51.0285°N 2.5241°W

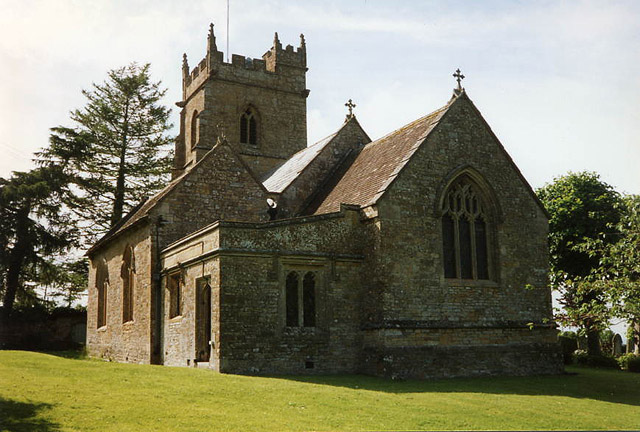
- Church of St Thomas à Becket in South Cadbury

- Location within Somerset
- Population: 284 (2011)
- OS grid reference: ST632256
- Civil parish: South Cadbury and Sutton Montis
- Unitary authority: Somerset
- Ceremonial county: Somerset
- Region: South West
- Country: England
- Sovereign state: United Kingdom
- Post town: Yeovil
- Postcode district: BA22 7
- Dialling code: 01963
- Police: Avon and Somerset
- Fire: Devon and Somerset
- Ambulance: South Western
- UK Parliament: Glastonbury and Somerton

South Cadbury is a village in the civil parish of South Cadbury and Sutton Montis, in the Somerset district of the ceremonial county of Somerset, England. The parish includes the village of Sutton Montis.

It is famous as the location of the hill fort of Cadbury Castle, thought by some to be King Arthur's Camelot.

== History ==
The name Cadbury means Cada's fort and refers to Cadbury Castle, which is immediately to the south west of the village. It is a vast Iron Age hill fort covering an area of around 20 acres (8 ha). The site has seen human occupation from Neolithic times until the late Saxon period. It was famously partially excavated by Leslie Alcock in the 1960s, when, amongst other things, an Arthurian period feasting hall was discovered. Since John Leland made reference to local traditions of a connection with King Arthur in the 16th century, there has been widespread speculation that this was the location of Camelot. King Arthur's Well sits at the foot of the hill and the local public house, the Red Lion, was renamed The Camelot when it was remodelled in 2004.

In the Domesday Book of 1086 the manor is recorded as held by Turstin FitzRolf.

The parish was part of the hundred of Catsash.

=== Civil parish ===
On 1 April 1933, part of the parish of Sutton Montis was merged with South Cadbury, on 1 January 2015 the merged parish was renamed "South Cadbury & Sutton Montis". In 1931 the parish of South Cadbury (prior to the merge) had a population of 146.

== Governance ==
The parish council has responsibility for local issues, including setting an annual precept (local rate) to cover the council's operating costs and producing annual accounts for public scrutiny. The parish council evaluates local planning applications and works with the local police, district council officers, and neighbourhood watch groups on matters of crime, security, and traffic. The parish council's role also includes initiating projects for the maintenance and repair of parish facilities, as well as consulting with the district council on the maintenance, repair, and improvement of highways, drainage, footpaths, public transport, and street cleaning. Conservation matters (including trees and listed buildings) and environmental issues are also the responsibility of the council.

For local government purposes, since 1 April 2023, the parish comes under the unitary authority of Somerset Council. Prior to this, it was part of the non-metropolitan district of South Somerset (established under the Local Government Act 1972). It was part of Wincanton Rural District before 1974.

It is also part of the Glastonbury and Somerton county constituency represented in the House of Commons of the Parliament of the United Kingdom. It elects one Member of Parliament (MP) by the first past the post system of election.

== Geography ==
South Cadbury is located at grid reference ST632256, 7.5 miles (12 km) north-east of Yeovil. The village lies just south of the main A303 road from London to the south-west of England, which runs through the north of the civil parish. As well as South Cadbury itself, the parish includes the village of Sutton Montis to the south of Cadbury Hill. This is one of three large hills in the centre and south-eastern portion of the parish, the others being Littleton Hill and the Beacon. There is a hill fort on Cadbury Hill and a disused quarry on Littleton Hill. South Cadbury is part of the Castle Cary ward, which elects two councillors to Somerset Council.

== Religious sites ==
The South Cadbury parish church of St Thomas à Becket is dedicated to Thomas Becket. It largely dates from the 13th and 15th centuries, but was widely restored in 1874. Many of the fittings date from this time. However, it does boast a 15th-century roof, with angel brackets and carved bosses, and an early wall painting of St Thomas. The church is a Grade II* listed building. The 18th century poet and satirist, Charles Churchill was at one time curate at South Cadbury.

Sutton Montis parish church is dedicated to the Holy Trinity. It has Saxon origins and includes surviving work of the 12th century. It is a Grade I listed building.

== Notable residents ==
- Herbert Pitman (1877–1961), Merchant Navy Officer and third officer on the RMS Titanic.
