= Drayton, Somerset =

Village and civil parish in Somerset, England

Coordinates: 51.01947°N 2.85108°W

Drayton
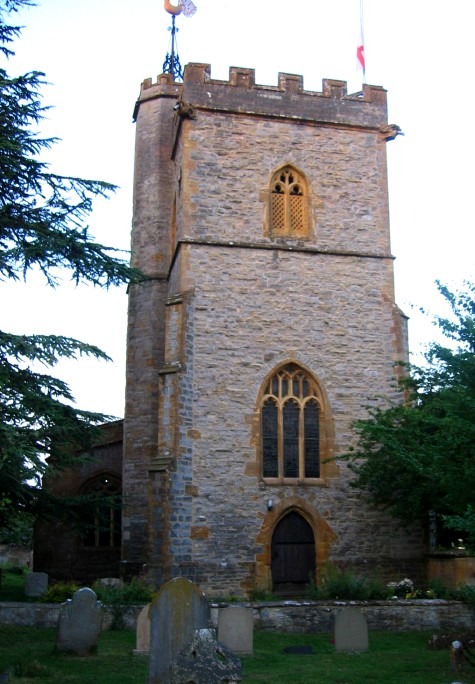
- The tower of St Catherine's, Drayton

- Location within Somerset
- Population: 379 (2011)
- OS grid reference: ST404248
- Unitary authority: Somerset Council
- Ceremonial county: Somerset
- Region: South West
- Country: England
- Sovereign state: United Kingdom
- Post town: Langport
- Postcode district: TA10
- Dialling code: 01458
- Police: Avon and Somerset
- Fire: Devon and Somerset
- Ambulance: South Western
- UK Parliament: Glastonbury and Somerton

Drayton is a village and civil parish in Somerset, England, located less than a mile from Curry Rivel and five miles southwest of Somerton in the South Somerset district. It adjoins the River Isle, near its confluence with the Parrett, and the former Westport Canal. The parish includes the hamlet of Midelney.

The village has a population of 379 and is home to St Catherine's parish church and the Drayton Crown pub.

== History ==
It is trite in Anglo-Saxon language the name of the village means literally "drawing-town", the word dray being largely obsolete save for dray horse being one that drags or draws a load, at a time when the inceptive form of town ton had not turned into its larger sense today. Locally this may refer to "ledges or drays" being used for boats or for the drawn plough as in most other examples.

The probable site of a Roman house has been identified west of the vicarage.

Drayton was part of the hundred of Abdick and Bulstone.

== Governance ==
The parish council has responsibility for local issues, including setting an annual precept (local rate) to cover the council's operating costs and producing annual accounts for public scrutiny. The parish council evaluates local planning applications and works with the local police, district council officers, and neighbourhood watch groups on matters of crime, security, and traffic. The parish council's role also includes initiating projects for the maintenance and repair of parish facilities, as well as consulting with the district council on the maintenance, repair, and improvement of highways, drainage, footpaths, public transport, and street cleaning. Conservation matters (including trees and listed buildings) and environmental issues are also the responsibility of the council.

For local government purposes, since 1 April 2023, the parish comes under the unitary authority of Somerset Council. Prior to this, it was part of the non-metropolitan district of South Somerset (established under the Local Government Act 1972). It was part of Langport Rural District before 1974.

It is also part of the Glastonbury and Somerton county constituency represented in the House of Commons of the Parliament of the United Kingdom. It elects one Member of Parliament (MP) by the first past the post system of election.

== Landmarks ==
Midelney Manor is a Grade I manor house in landscaped grounds. It is sited on a former island site, and was the property of Muchelney Abbey, passing to the Trevillian family after the dissolution of the monasteries. The present house was built in the late 16th century in two distinct halves by Richard and Thomas Trevillian. Drayton Manor is more recent and was built in the late 18th or early 19th century.

== Religious sites ==
St Catherine's exterior is Blue Lias and golden hamstone. It dates from the 15th century, being restored in 1855 by Maurice Davis of Langport and again in 1896. It has been designated by English Heritage as a Grade I listed building. The 15th century cross in the churchyard has a sculpture of St Michael with a sword and shield in the act of vanquishing a dragon. The rectory, known as Drayton Court, which dates from the early 19th century, is now a private house and the seat of the Earls of Cromer.

== Drayton Wassailers ==
Drayton is one of the few villages in the UK that still practice house-visiting wassailing, not to be confused with orchard-visiting wassailing, which has now been almost entirely displaced by carolling. The annual event is held on 5 January and involves the Wassailers traveling to a handful of houses around the village before ending at the Drayton Crown. In 2021, the event was held though online video due to the COVID-19 pandemic in the UK.

== Stained glass windows at St Catherine's, Drayton ==
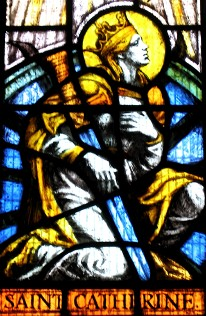
Window showing the namesake saint, Catherine of Alexandria

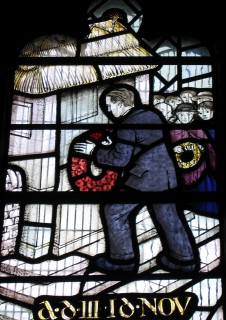
Window depicting the laying of a poppy wreath, honouring soldiers who died in the world wars

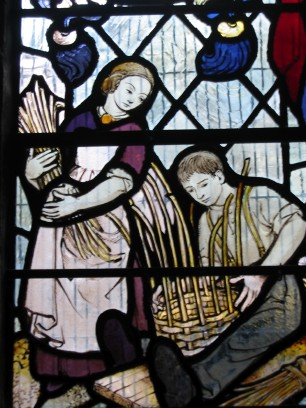
Window depicting basketweaving, a local cottage industry

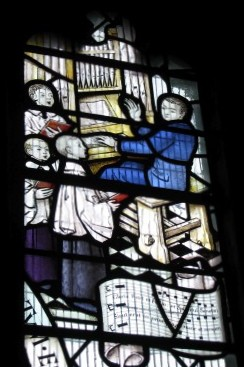
Window depicting the church organist and children's choir
