= Barrington, Somerset =

Village and civil parish in Somerset, England

Coordinates: 50.9626°N 2.8770°W

Barrington
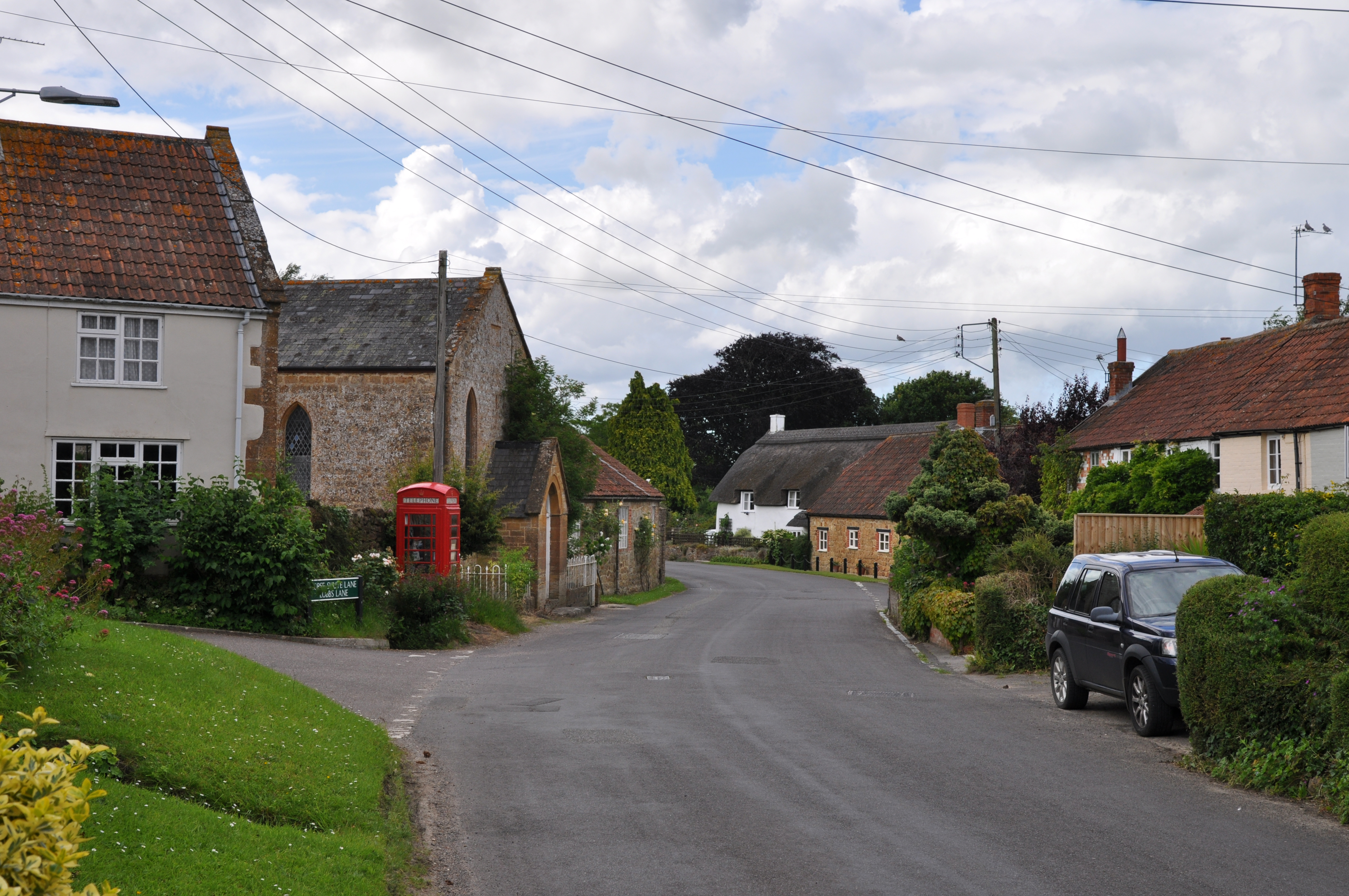
- Barrington's main street

- Location within Somerset
- Population: 438 (2011)
- OS grid reference: ST385185
- Civil parish: Barrington
- Unitary authority: Somerset Council
- Ceremonial county: Somerset
- Region: South West
- Country: England
- Sovereign state: United Kingdom
- Post town: ILMINSTER
- Postcode district: TA19
- Dialling code: 01460
- Police: Avon and Somerset
- Fire: Devon and Somerset
- Ambulance: South Western
- UK Parliament: Glastonbury and Somerton

Barrington is a village and civil parish, situated 10 miles (16.1 km) south east of Taunton and 10 miles (16.1 km) west of Yeovil in Somerset, England. The village has a population of 438.

The village is located on the southern edge of the Somerset Levels and many of the houses are built from cob and thatched with local reeds.

== History ==
The parish of Barrington was part of the South Petherton Hundred.

== Governance ==
The parish council has responsibility for local issues, including setting an annual precept (local rate) to cover the council's operating costs and producing annual accounts for public scrutiny. The parish council evaluates local planning applications and works with the local police, district council officers, and neighbourhood watch groups on matters of crime, security, and traffic. The parish council's role also includes initiating projects for the maintenance and repair of parish facilities, as well as consulting with the district council on the maintenance, repair, and improvement of highways, drainage, footpaths, public transport, and street cleaning. Conservation matters (including trees and listed buildings) and environmental issues are also the responsibility of the council.

For local government purposes, since 1 April 2023, the village comes under the unitary authority of Somerset Council. Prior to this, it was part of the non-metropolitan district of South Somerset, which was formed on 1 April 1974 under the Local Government Act 1972, having previously been part of Langport Rural District.

It is located in the Glastonbury and Somerton parliamentary constituency represented in the House of Commons of the Parliament of the United Kingdom. It elects one Member of Parliament (MP) by the first past the post system of election.

== Landmarks ==
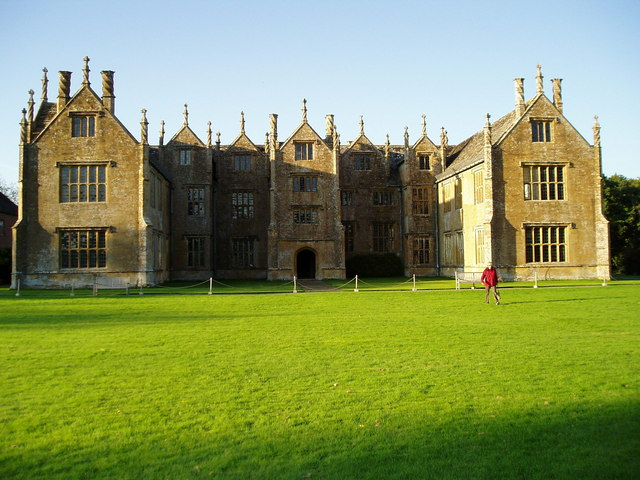
Barrington Court

Barrington Court, the local manor house, is a fine Tudor building which anticipates some features of the later Elizabethan style. It was built around 1514 for Henry Daubeney, 1st Earl of Bridgewater and perhaps finished as late as 1558 for William Clifton. The interior was virtually gutted in 1825, and restored in 1921–25 by James Edwin Forbes and John Duncan Tate for A.A. Lyle having passed to the National Trust in 1908. It is a Grade I listed building.

The village has a traditional public house called the Barrington Boar, which formerly was called The Oak.

== Religious sites ==
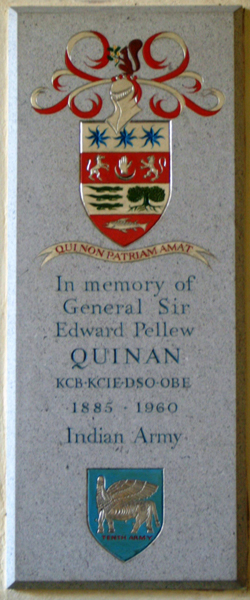
Memorial plaque

The 13th-century St Mary's Church has an unusual octagonal tower, which includes a bell dating from 1743 and made by Thomas Bilbie of the Bilbie family. It has been designated by English Heritage as a Grade I listed building.

The church bears a memorial to WWII General Sir Edward Pellew Quinan KCB, KCIE, DSO, OBE.
