= Curry Mallet =

Village and civil parish in Somerset, England

Coordinates: 50.9889°N 2.9630°W

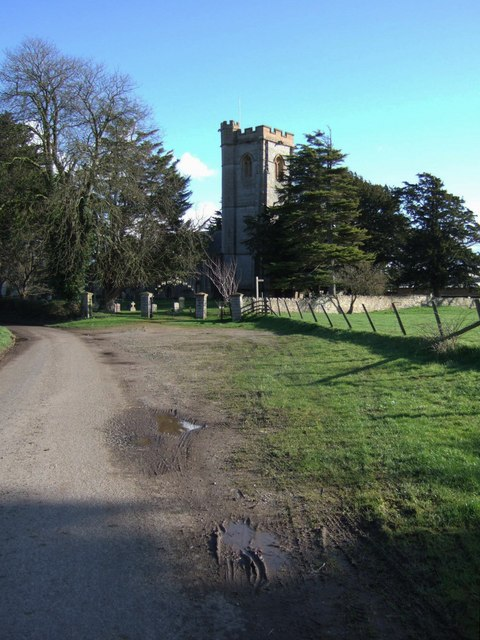
- Church of St James, Curry Mallet

- Location within Somerset
- Population: 306 (2011)
- OS grid reference: ST325215
- Unitary authority: Somerset Council
- Ceremonial county: Somerset
- Region: South West
- Country: England
- Sovereign state: United Kingdom
- Post town: TAUNTON
- Postcode district: TA3
- Police: Avon and Somerset
- Fire: Devon and Somerset
- Ambulance: South Western
- UK Parliament: Glastonbury and Somerton

Curry Mallet is a village and parish in Somerset, England. It is on the Fivehead River (also known as the River Ile), 7 miles (11.3 km) east of Taunton. The village has a population of 306.

== History ==
At the time of the Domesday Book in 1086 the manor was held by Roger de Courselles, also the owner of Fisherton in Wiltshire, which was held under Curry. It later passed to the Malet (also spelt as Mallet or Mallett) family, with William Malet, one of the guarantors of Magna Carta, lord of the manor in 1215. It passed on through the descendants of the Malet family until 1356 when it was sold to Sir Matthew Gourney and his family until 1443 when the estate passed to the king and became part of the Duchy of Cornwall.

Curry Mallet was part of the hundred of Abdick and Bulstone.

The Manor House is a Grade II* listed building, includes a Great Hall (or perhaps a barn) of the 15th century, and a small irregular manor house of the late 16th century. It stands on the site of, and incorporates parts of, the castle built by William Malet, a Norman knight who fought at the Battle of Hastings.

In World War II, pillboxes were placed in the village as part of the Taunton Stop Line.

== Governance ==
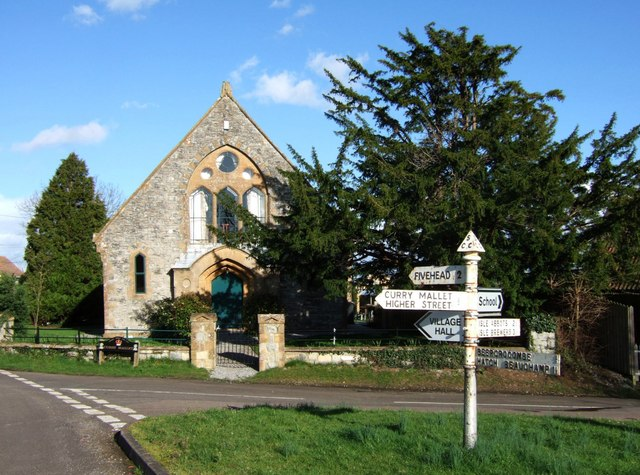
Pope's Cross

The parish council has responsibility for local issues, including setting an annual precept (local rate) to cover the council's operating costs and producing annual accounts for public scrutiny. The parish council evaluates local planning applications and works with the local police, district council officers, and neighbourhood watch groups on matters of crime, security, and traffic. The parish council's role also includes initiating projects for the maintenance and repair of parish facilities, as well as consulting with the district council on the maintenance, repair, and improvement of highways, drainage, footpaths, public transport, and street cleaning. Conservation matters (including trees and listed buildings) and environmental issues are also the responsibility of the council.

For local government purposes, since 1 April 2023, the parish comes under the unitary authority of Somerset Council. Prior to this, it was part of the non-metropolitan district of South Somerset (established under the Local Government Act 1972). It was part of Langport Rural District before 1974.

It is also part of the Glastonbury and Somerton county constituency represented in the House of Commons of the Parliament of the United Kingdom. It elects one Member of Parliament (MP) by the first past the post system of election, and was part of the South West England constituency of the European Parliament prior to Britain leaving the European Union in January 2020, which elected seven MEPs using the d'Hondt method of party-list proportional representation.

== Religious sites ==
The parish Church of St James has 13th-century origins and has been designated as a Grade I listed building.

== School ==
Curry Mallet Primary School is the small community Church of England school located within the village.

== Legends and Haunting of the Manor ==
In legend three streams are said to run under the manor leading directly to the holy well at the foot of Glastonbury Tor.

Although unsubstantiated, numerous reports exist of the haunting of the manor house. The most frequently reported apparition is that of a woman in Elizabethan costume. In addition, the Great Hall is said to be haunted by a pacing man. The sound of metallic clashes, possibly resulting from a ghostly duel, have been heard echoing in the courtyard.
