= Elterwater =

Village in Cumbria, England

Coordinates: 54.434222°N 3.037741°W

- Village
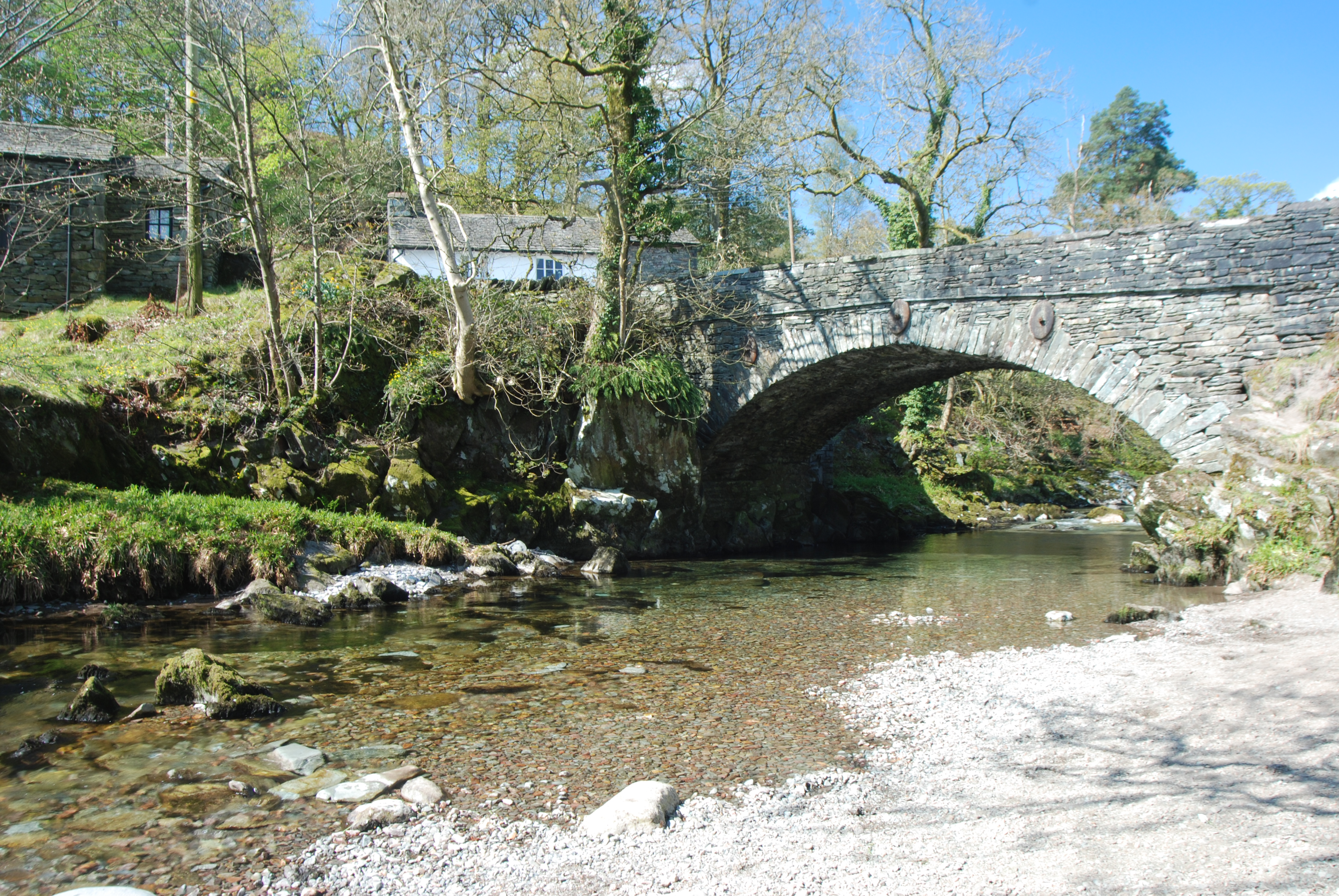
- Elterwater Bridge

- Location in the former South Lakeland district Location within Cumbria
- OS grid reference: NY327048
- Civil parish: Lakes
- Unitary authority: Westmorland and Furness
- Ceremonial county: Cumbria
- Region: North West
- Country: England
- Sovereign state: United Kingdom
- Post town: AMBLESIDE
- Postcode district: LA22
- Dialling code: 015394
- Police: Cumbria
- Fire: Cumbria
- Ambulance: North West
- UK Parliament: Westmorland and Lonsdale

Elterwater is a village in the English Lake District and the county of Cumbria. The village lies half a mile (800 m) north-west of the lake of Elter Water, from which it derives its name. Both are situated in the valley of Great Langdale.

Elterwater Bridge is a Grade II listed structure dating to at least the 18th century.

== Economic activity ==
In the past, the principal industries have been farming, quarrying for slate and gunpowder manufacture. The first two activities continue, while evidence of the latter survives in the grounds of the Langdale Estate, a holiday development founded in the 1930s and redeveloped as a timeshare in the 1980s.

In the present day, tourism is a principal source of income and the village is popular with visitors of all kinds, particularly fell-walkers due to its proximity to many of the Lake District's most popular fells. The village is home to a plethora of holiday homes, as well as the Britannia Inn and Elterwater Hostel, a former YHA hostel, that was saved from closure and taken independent in 2013.

== Art ==
In the 1880s, the Guild of St George founded by John Ruskin revived small-scale linen spinning and weaving in Langdale, at a cottage in Elterwater, led by Albert Fleming and Marion Twelves and continued by Elizabeth Pepper. The decorative textiles became known as Ruskin Lace. In 1947, German artist Kurt Schwitters created one of his Merzbau in a barn at Cylinders. This three-dimensional artwork, and the entire wall on which it was installed, was moved to the Hatton Gallery in Newcastle in 1965. Artist Bernard Eyre-Walker lived and painted in Elterwater in the 1930s and 40s. Watercolour painter Thomas Frederick Worrall's painting Elterwater Tarn and Langdale Pikes is in the Bishop of Carlisle's house in Keswick.

Only a quarter of the houses in Elterwater are permanently occupied, the rest being holiday cottages.

== Toponymy ==
'The lake frequented by swans', from old Norse 'elptr'/'alpt' 'swan', in the gen.[itive], sing.[ular] form with '-ar', and 'water', probably replacing old Norse 'vatn' 'lake'. Whooper swans still winter on the lake.

== Gallery ==
A road sign in Elterwater

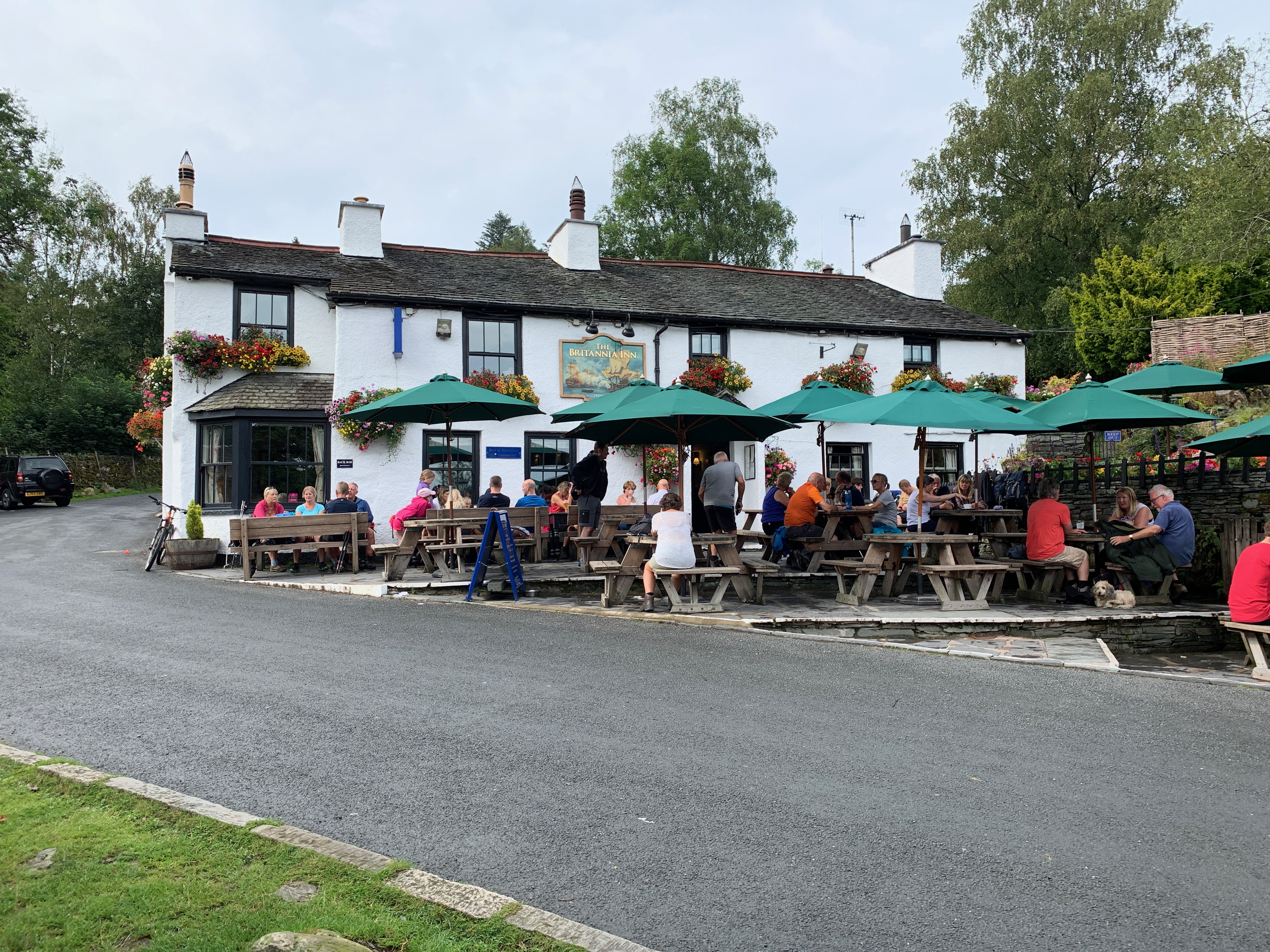
The Britannia Inn, 2019

== Bibliography ==
- Parker, John Wilson (2004). An Atlas of the English Lakes. Cicerone Press. ISBN 1-85284-355-1.
