= Brympton =

Village in Somerset, England

Coordinates: 50.9370°N 2.6835°W

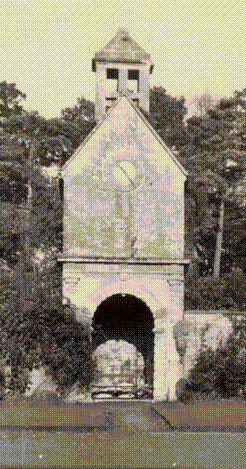
- The Brympton clock tower

- Location within Somerset
- Population: 7,308 (2011)
- OS grid reference: ST520155
- Civil parish: Brympton
- Unitary authority: Somerset
- Ceremonial county: Somerset
- Region: South West
- Country: England
- Sovereign state: United Kingdom
- Post town: YEOVIL
- Postcode district: BA22
- Dialling code: 01935
- Police: Avon and Somerset
- Fire: Devon and Somerset
- Ambulance: South Western
- UK Parliament: Yeovil

Brympton is a village, civil parish and electoral ward in Somerset, England. The parish is situated on the north-west edge of Yeovil. The parish/ward has a population of 7,308. The civil parish covers the western part of the Yeovil built up area, including the stadium of Yeovil Town F.C. at Huish Park, and also includes the hamlets of Brympton D'Evercy, Lufton, Thorne Coffin and Alvington as well as part of Chilthorne Domer. From 1974 to 2023 it was in South Somerset district.

== History ==
An important late Roman villa was excavated at Lufton by Leonard Hayward of Yeovil Grammar School during the 1950s and 1960s. Further work on this villa and its landscape was undertaken by archaeologists from Newcastle University between 2012 and 2017. The villa is a corridor building with an unusual octagonal plunge bath. A number of mosaics were found, including one around the octagonal pool depicting fish.

Brympton, historically spelt Brimpton, was an ancient parish, part of the Stone Hundred. The parish included the historic manor house known as Brympton d'Evercy, and the hamlets of Alvington and Houndstone. It became a civil parish in 1866. In 1930 the parish absorbed part of the civil parish of Preston Plucknett, which was abolished.

Lufton was also an ancient parish, part of the Stone Hundred. In 1866 it became a civil parish, which was abolished in 1933 and absorbed into the civil parish of Brympton. Lufton Manor, which dates from 1900 is an example of Queen Anne style architecture. It was designed by architect Evelyn Hellicar (1862–1929). It is a grade II listed building.

Thorne Coffin was an ancient parish in the Tintinhull Hundred. In 1866 it became a civil parish, which was abolished in 1933 and absorbed into the civil parish of Brympton.

== Governance ==
The parish council has responsibility for local issues, including setting an annual precept (local rate) to cover the council's operating costs and producing annual accounts for public scrutiny. The parish council evaluates local planning applications and works with the local police, district council officers, and neighbourhood watch groups on matters of crime, security, and traffic. The parish council's role also includes initiating projects for the maintenance and repair of parish facilities, as well as consulting with the district council on the maintenance, repair, and improvement of highways, drainage, footpaths, public transport, and street cleaning. Conservation matters (including trees and listed buildings) and environmental issues are also the responsibility of the council.

The village fell within the Non-metropolitan district of South Somerset from on 1 April 1974 to 2023, having previously been part of Yeovil Rural District. The district council was responsible for local planning and building control, local roads, council housing, environmental health, markets and fairs, refuse collection and recycling, cemeteries and crematoria, leisure services, parks, and tourism.

Somerset Council is responsible for running the largest and most expensive local services such as education, social services, libraries, main roads, public transport, policing and fire services, trading standards, waste disposal and strategic planning.

It is also part of the Yeovil county constituency represented in the House of Commons of the Parliament of the United Kingdom. It elects one Member of Parliament (MP) by the first past the post system of election, and was part of the South West England constituency of the European Parliament prior to Britain leaving the European Union in January 2020, which elected seven MEPs using the d'Hondt method of party-list proportional representation.

== Religious sites ==
The Church of St. Andrew, the parish church of Brympton, dates from the 13th century and has been designated by English Heritage as a grade I listed building.

The Church of St Andrew, the parish church of Thorne Coffin, was built in the 14th century. It is a Grade II* listed building.

The Church of St Peter and St Paul, the parish church of Lufton, dates from the 14th century or earlier, but was rebuilt in 1865 by Benjamin Ferrey. It is a Grade II listed building.
