= Preston Plucknett =

Suburb of Yeovil, Somerset, England

Coordinates: 50.9460°N 2.6632°W

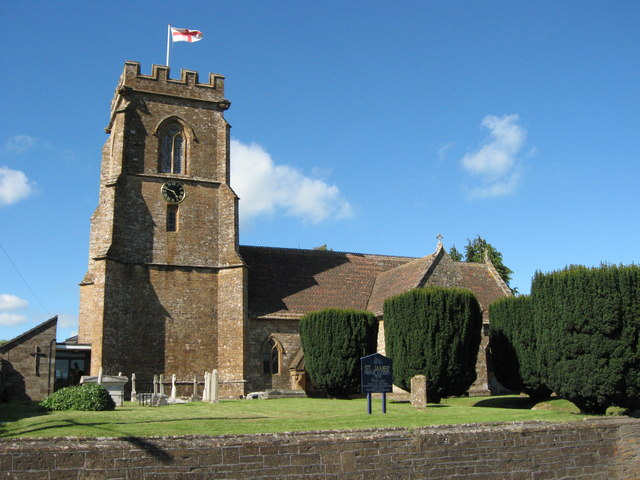
- Church of St James, Preston Plucknett

- Location within Somerset
- OS grid reference: ST535165
- Civil parish: Yeovil
- Unitary authority: Somerset
- Ceremonial county: Somerset
- Region: South West
- Country: England
- Sovereign state: United Kingdom
- Post town: YEOVIL
- Postcode district: BA21
- Dialling code: 01935
- Police: Avon and Somerset
- Fire: Devon and Somerset
- Ambulance: South Western
- UK Parliament: Yeovil

Preston Plucknett is a suburb of Yeovil in Somerset, England. It was once a small village, and a separate civil parish until 31 March 1930, when it was absorbed into the neighbouring parishes of Yeovil, Brympton and West Coker. It was listed in the Domesday Book of 1086 as "Preston" (Old English: preost tun, "priest farm/settlement") when its lord was Ansger of Montacute (Alfward before 1066). In the 13th century, Alan de Plugenet was lord of the manor and added his surname to Preston. Following the 20th century expansion of Yeovil, Preston Plucknett became little more than a suburb of the town. Throughout the centuries the spelling and pronunciation of the name has changed and evolved until it became the present day "Preston Plucknett." The parish of Preston Plucknett was part of the Stone Hundred. In 1921 the parish had a population of 591.

The village church, dedicated to St James, dates from 1420, and has a 20 m (60 ft) tower with six bells. The church was restored and partially rebuilt during the 1860s. A vestry was added in the 1950s and an annexe in 1979, which was expanded in 2001. It became a separate parish church in 1988: until that time, it had been a church of St John’s, the parish church of Yeovil. It has a daughter church, St Peter's, built in the 1930s.

The tithe barn at Preston Plucknett was included in the fifth list of ancient monuments prepared by the Commissioner of Works in 1925. The Abbey Barn and associated Abbey Farm House are both Grade I listed buildings.

The still preserved manor house of Preston Plucknett was built in the early 15th century, around 1420, by John Stourton (d. 1438; cousin of his namesake John Stourton, 1st Baron Stourton), a justice of the peace, sheriff, and several times Member of Parliament for Somerset, who, helped by three good marriages, accumulated a respectable wealth. The manor was left to his third and surviving spouse, Katherine Payne, and eventually inherited by his three daughters, one of which, Alice, was married to Sir William Daubeney and was the mother of Giles Daubeney, 1st Baron Daubeney.

The village is included in The Meaning of Liff defined as "a very large string bag made of thin strong cord into which feathers from freshly killed ducks and chickens were stuffed, from Preston in Lancashire".

== Notable people ==
- Walter Raymond (1852-1931), the novelist and poet, lived at Sutherland House c.1892-1905.
- John Sowerby (1823-1902), a botanist, writer, and early Alpine Club member, was Preston Plucknett's vicar from 1872 to 1884.
