= Church of St Andrew, Thorne Coffin =

Church in Somerset, England

Church of St Andrew
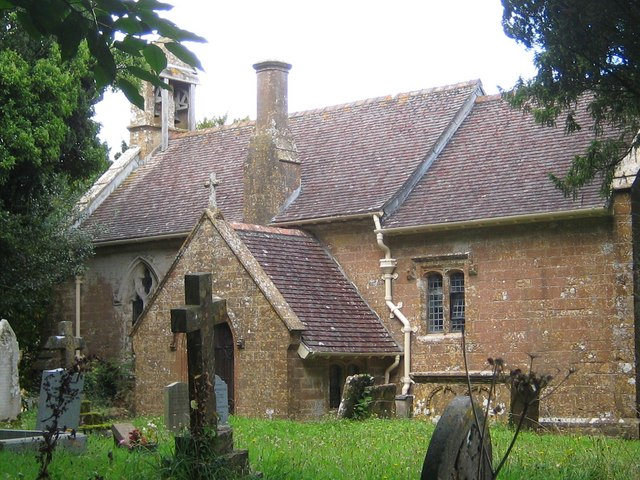

- Location within Somerset
- 50.9559°N 2.6762°W
- Location: Thorne Coffin, Somerset, England

History
- Built: 14th century

Listed Building – Grade II*
- Official name: Church of St Andrew
- Designated: 19 April 1961
- Reference no.: 1263070

The Church of St Andrew in Thorne Coffin, Somerset, England, was built in the 14th century. It is a Grade II* listed building.

== History ==
The church was built in the 14th century and restored in 1891. The north porch was built in 1613.

The parish is part of the Five Crosses benefice which includes Tintinhull, Chilthorne Domer, Yeovil Marsh, Thorne Coffin and Lufton, within the Diocese of Bath and Wells.

== Architecture ==
The stone building has a tiled roof with a small bellcote. It consists of a one-bay chancel and two-bay nave, with small porches on the northern and southern sides.

The interior fittings, including the font are 18th century except the octagonal pulpit which dates from 1624.

The churchyard is surrounded a 3 metres (9.8 ft) high wall and is home to several Yew trees.

== See also ==
- List of ecclesiastical parishes in the Diocese of Bath and Wells
