= Britannia Inn =

Pub in Cumbria, England

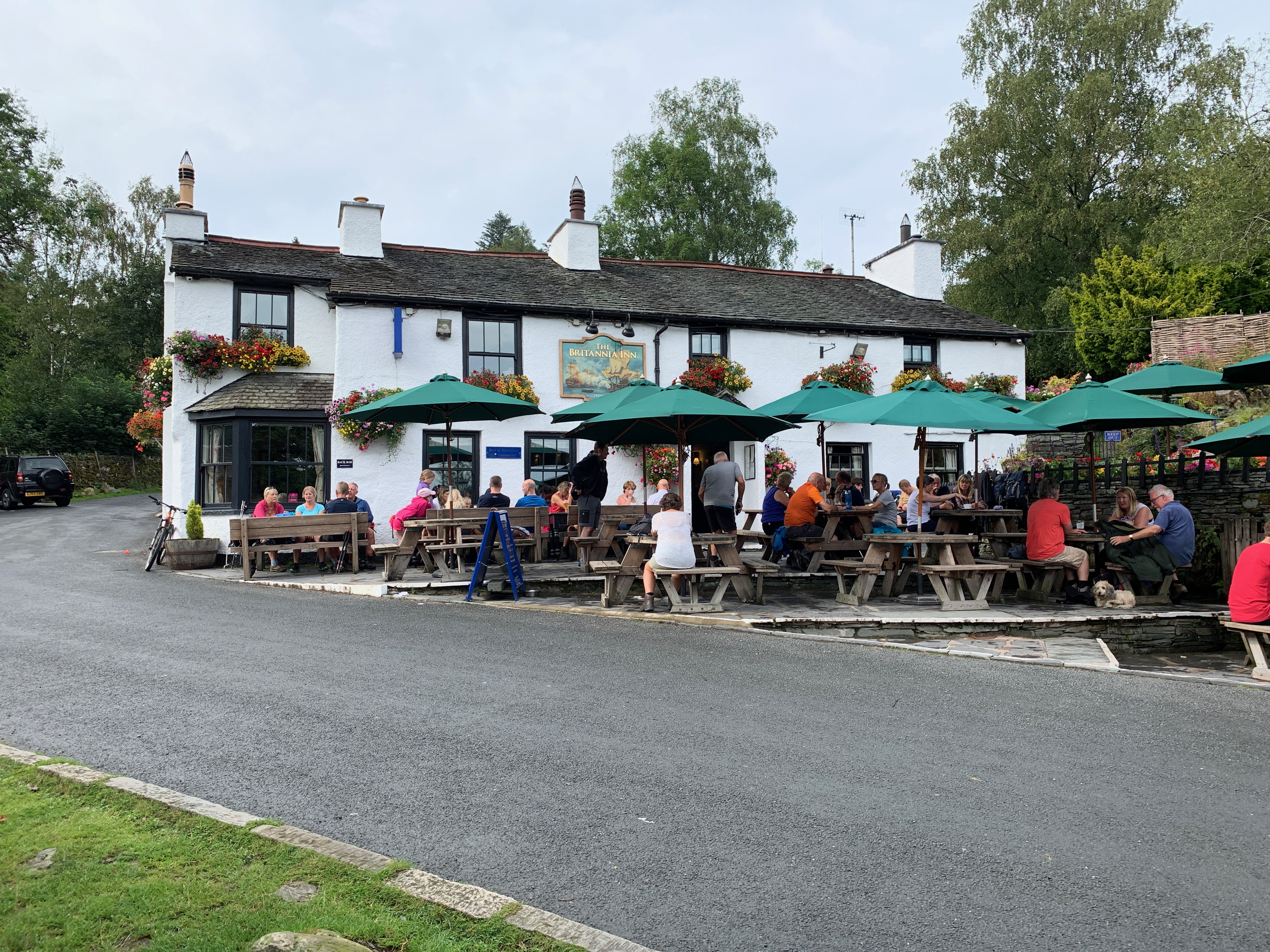
- The pub in 2019
- Interactive map of the Britannia Inn area

General information
- Type: Public house
- Location: Elterwater, Cumbria, England
- Coordinates: 54.4344347°N 3.03774°W
- Completed: 17th century

Website
- www.thebritanniainn.com

The Britannia Inn is a public house and inn in the English village of Elterwater, Cumbria. Dating to the 17th century, it is a Grade II listed building.

The building is in roughcast stone with a slate roof and two storeys. On the front is a small gabled porch, and the windows are sashes. To the left is a recessed bay with a bay window in the angle, and at the rear is a gabled wing.
