= Elterwater Bridge =

Bridge at Elterwater, England

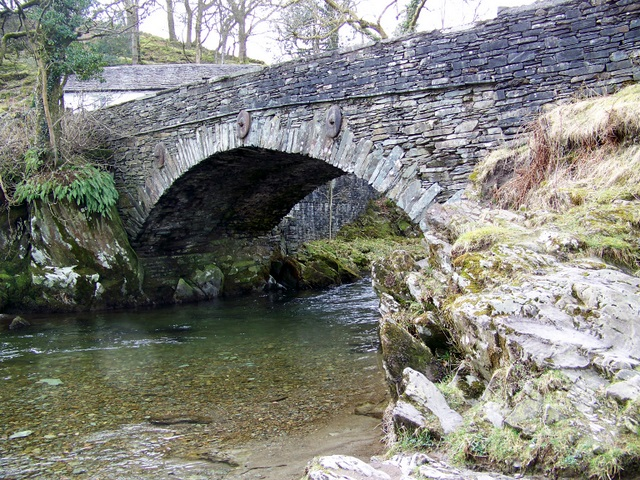
- Great Langdale Beck flowing beneath the bridge, looking north
- Coordinates: 54.43374°N 3.038166°W
- Crosses: Great Langdale Beck
- Locale: Elterwater, Cumbria, England

History
- Opened: 1702 (323 years ago)

Elterwater Bridge is a Grade II listed single-arch bridge spanning Great Langdale Beck in Elterwater, Cumbria, England. The structure dates to 1702.

The bridge, which has subsequently been widened, has a level parapet.

== See also ==
- Listed buildings in Lakes, Cumbria
