= Susan Miller, Baroness Miller of Chilthorne Domer =

English life peer of the House of Lords

The Right Honourable The Baroness Miller of Chilthorne Domer
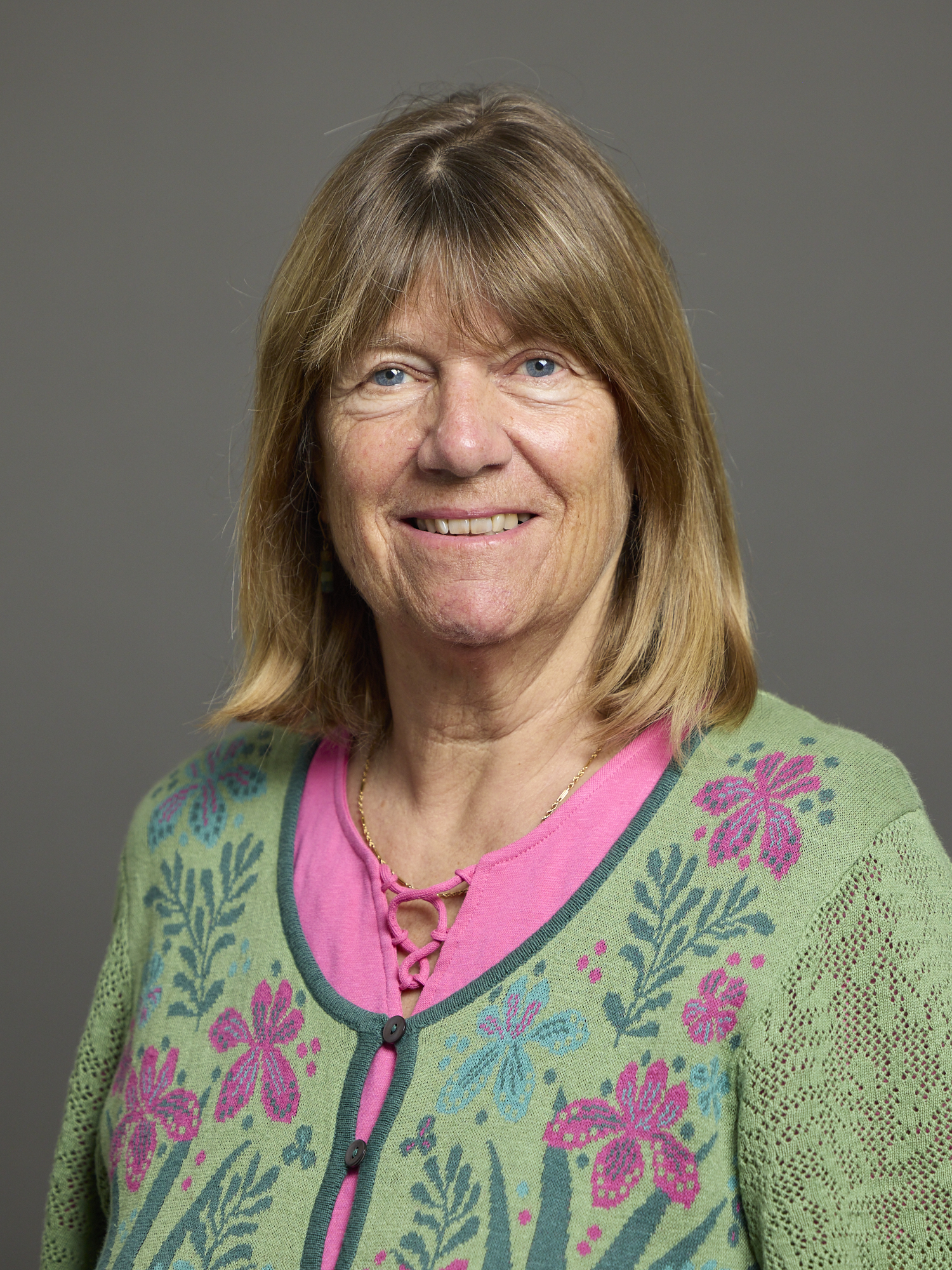
- Official portrait, 2025

Member of the House of Lords
- Lord Temporal
- Life peerage 28 July 1998

Personal details
- Born: 1 January 1954 (age 72)
- Party: Liberal Democrats

Susan Elizabeth Miller, Baroness Miller of Chilthorne Domer (born 1 January 1954) is a Liberal Democrat member of the House of Lords.

Sue Miller went to the Quaker school Sidcot. She went to Oxford Poly to study book publishing and subsequently worked for David and Charles, Weidenfeld and Penguin books. She then moved to Somerset/Dorset where she owned and ran two bookshops. In 1987 She stood for election as a Lib Deb. She served as a councillor at parish, district and county levels til 2005, leading South Somerset District Council. Under her leadership the council was voted Council of the Year in 1998. She was also elected to Somerset County Council. She was made a Life Peer as Baroness Miller of Chilthorne Domer, of Chilthorne Domer in the County of Somerset on 28 July 1998.

She was the Liberal Democrat spokesperson in the Lords on Agriculture and Rural Affairs 1999–2001, Environment, Food and Rural Affairs 2001–07 and Home Affairs 2007–09. She serves on the Select Committee on the Built Environment and the Joint Committee on Statutory Instruments. She chaired the All Party Groups on Agroecology and Food and Health. She is a co-president of Parliamentarians for Nuclear Non Proliferation and Disarmament.

She married John Miller in 1980 (divorced) and then Humphrey Temperley. By her first marriage she had two daughters, (one-deceased) and has three stepchildren.
