= St Margaret's Almshouses =

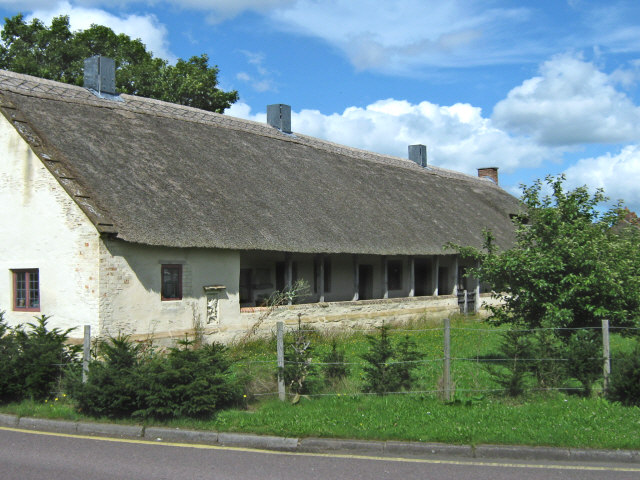
- St Margaret's Almshouses

- Shown in Somerset

Geography
- Location: Taunton, England
- Coordinates: 51°1′3″N 3°5′14″W

Organisation
- Type: Leper colony

History
- Founded: c.1180
- Closed: Early 16th century

St Margaret's Almshouses are part of a 12th-century leper colony in Taunton, Somerset, England.

== History ==
The building was founded as a leper hospital in the 12th century, Somerset Historical Environmental Records dates it to between 1174 and 1180 AD. Records of Taunton Priory describe it as The Chapel of St Margaret 'infirmorum' in 1180.

Glastonbury Abbey acquired the patronage of the hospital in 1280 and Abbot Beere rebuilt it as almshouses in the early 16th century. After the Dissolution of the Monasteries the associated chapel was demolished.

From 1612 to 1938 the building continued to be used as almshouses, cared for by a local parish. In the late 1930s it was converted into a hall of offices for the Rural Community Council and accommodation for the Somerset Guild of Craftsmen. The designer of those renovations was William Worrall of Glastonbury. From the late 1980s and the building then stood empty and then, in the early 1990s the thatched roof was destroyed by fire and the building suffered from vandalism and neglect until the Somerset Buildings Preservation Trust with Falcon Rural Housing purchased and restored it using, as faithfully as possible, the original architecture and building materials. After restoration it was purchased by Falcon Rural Housing as four dwellings of social housing.

It is a long freestanding single storey building, built mostly of local shillet stone. On the front of the building is a stone tablet with the arms of Abbot Bere of Glastonbury, the original restorer of the building. It is a grade II* listed building.
