= Church of St James, Preston Plucknett =

Church in Somerset, England

Church of St James
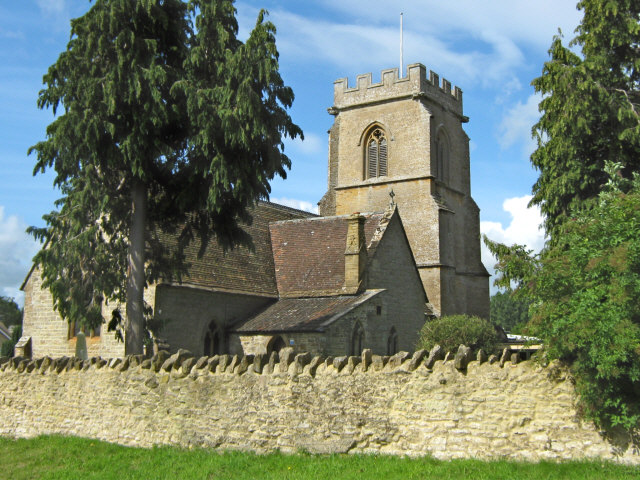

- Location within Somerset
- 50.9436°N 2.6636°W
- Location: Preston Plucknett, Somerset, England

History
- Built: 1420

Listed Building – Grade II*
- Official name: Church of St James
- Designated: 19 March 1951
- Reference no.: 1346135

The Church of St James in Preston Plucknett, Somerset, England, was built in 1420. It is a Grade II* listed building.

== History ==
The church was built in 1420 with substantial Victorian restoration in the 19th century. The church which had been funded by John Stourton was consecrated in 1443.

A vestry was added in the 1950s and an annexe in 1979, which was expanded in 2001.

It became a separate parish church in 1988: until that time, it had been a church of St John's, the parish church of Yeovil.

The parish and benefice of Preston Plucknett is within the Diocese of Bath and Wells.

== Architecture ==
The hamstone building has clay tile roofs. The 60 feet (18 m) high three-stage west tower survives from the original 15th century church with the addition of a clock in the 19th. It is supported by diagonal buttresses, and contains six bells.

In the churchyard is a 15th-century cross, however the head of the cross with three figures on it is now stored in a glass case within the church itself.

== See also ==
- List of ecclesiastical parishes in the Diocese of Bath and Wells
