= Church of St Mary, Chilthorne Domer =

Church in Somerset, England

Church of St Mary
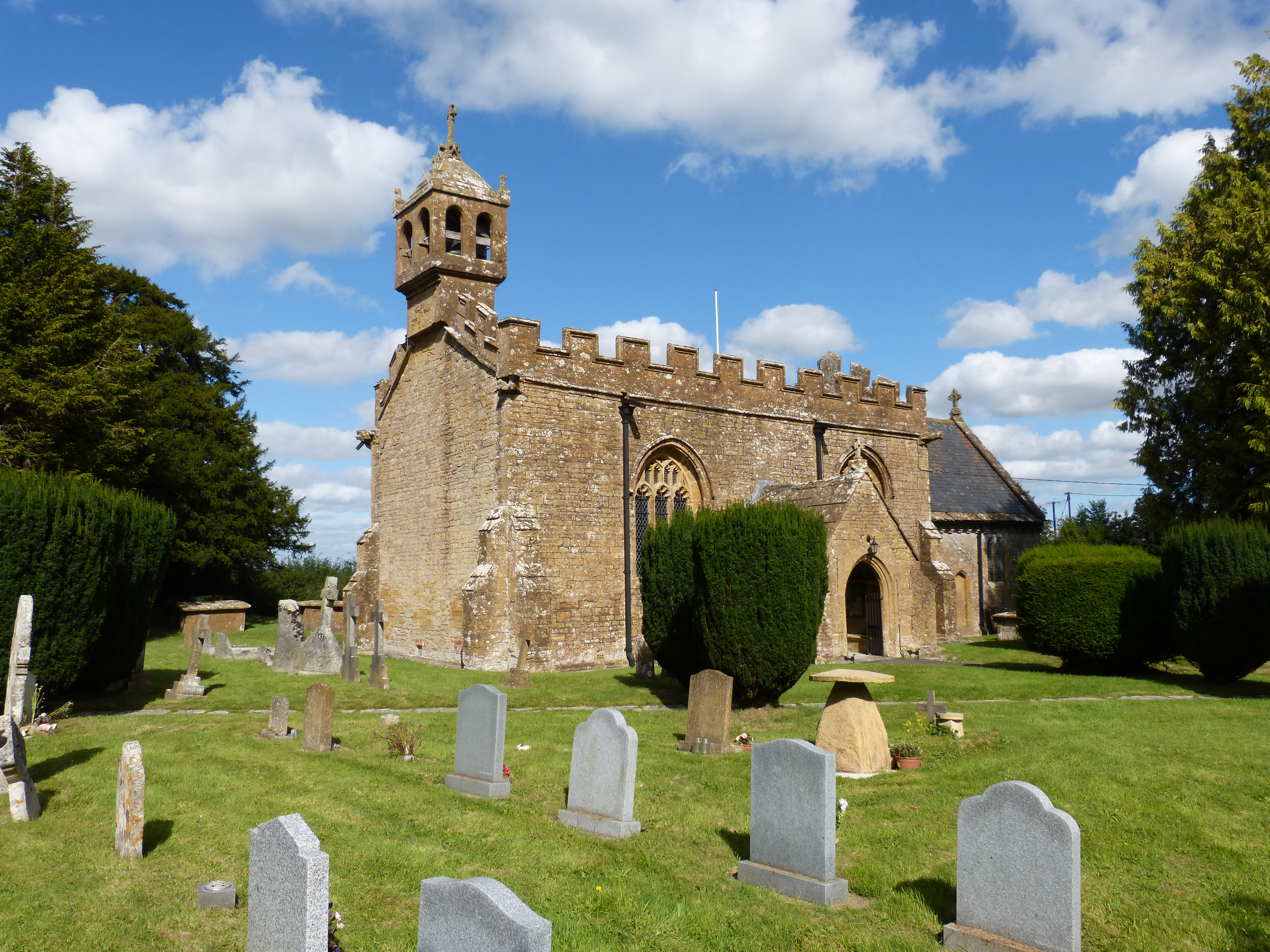

- Location within Somerset
- 50.9723°N 2.6781°W
- Location: Chilthorne Domer, Somerset, England

History
- Built: 13th century

Listed Building – Grade II*
- Official name: Church of St Mary
- Designated: 19 April 1961
- Reference no.: 1345756

The Anglican Church of St Mary in Chilthorne Domer, Somerset, England was built in the 13th century. It is a Grade II* listed building.

== History ==
The church was built in the 13th century, and was granted to Bruton Priory in 1301. Restoration and revision of the building took place in the 14th and 15th centuries with some Victorian restoration in the 19th.

The parish is part of the Five Crosses benefice including Tintinhull and the surrounding villages within the Diocese of Bath and Wells.

== Architecture ==
The hamstone building has slate roofs with a small bell turret. It consists of a three-bay nave and two-bay chancel.

Inside the church the pulpit is from the 17th century, as are some of the pews. The 15th-century font is octagonal. An effigy in the sanctuary is dated to around 1275.

In the churchyard are a group of three chest tombs dating from the 17th and 18th centuries.

== See also ==
- List of ecclesiastical parishes in the Diocese of Bath and Wells
