= Hundred of Stone =

Historical Hundred of Somerset, England

Stone Hundred
- Area
- 10,720 acres (4,340 ha)
- Status: Hundred
- Subdivisions
  - Type: Parishes
  - Units: Ashington, Brympton, Chilthorne Domer, Limington, Lufton, Mudford, Preston Plucknett, and Yeovil

The Hundred of Stone is one of the 40 historical hundreds in the ceremonial county of Somerset, England, dating from sometime before the Norman conquest during the Anglo-Saxon era. Each hundred had a fyrd as its local defence force, and a court responsible for the maintenance of the frankpledge system. They also formed a unit for the collection of taxes. The hundred court's role was described in the Dooms (laws) of King Edgar. The name of the hundred was normally that of its meeting-place.

The Hundred of Stone consisted of the ancient parishes of Ashington, Brympton, Chilthorne Domer, Limington, Lufton, Mudford, Preston Plucknett and Yeovil. It covered an area of 10,720 acres (4,340 ha).

The importance of the hundred courts declined from the seventeenth century on. By the 19th century, several different single-purpose subdivisions of counties, such as poor law unions, sanitary districts, and highway districts appeared, filling the administrative role previously played by parishes and hundreds. Although the hundreds have never been formally abolished, their functions ended with the establishment of county courts in 1867 and the introduction of districts by the Local Government Act 1894.
