= Elter Water =

Lake in Cumbria, England

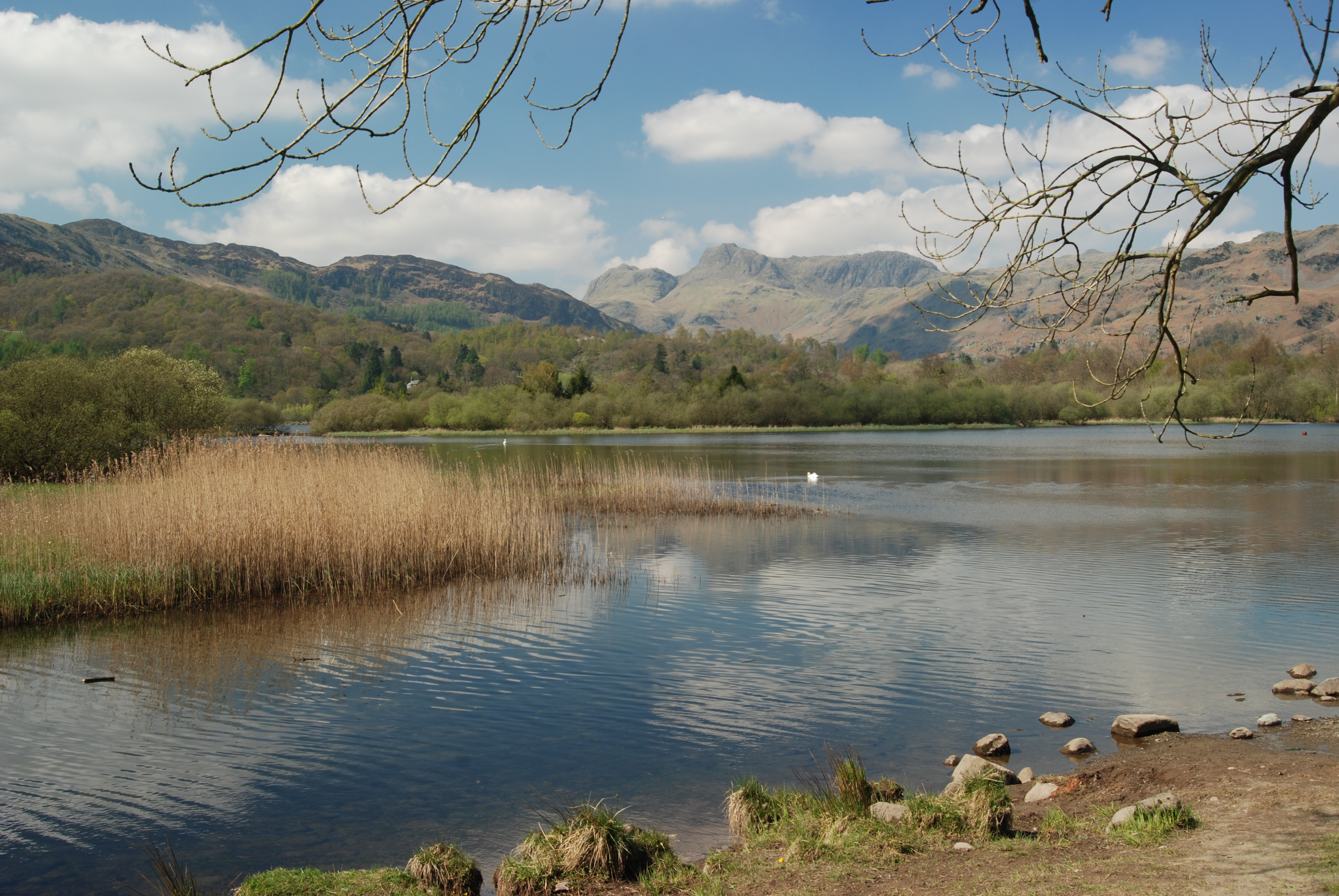
- Elter Water with the Langdale Pikes in the background

- Location in the Lake District National Park Location in South Lakeland, Cumbria
- Location: Lake District, Cumbria
- Coordinates: 54.427469°N 3.025875°W
- Type: Tarn
- Primary inflows: River Brathay, Langdale Beck
- Primary outflows: River Brathay
- Basin countries: United Kingdom
- Max. length: 1,030 yd (940 m)
- Max. width: 350 yd (320 m)
- Surface area: 0.06 sq mi (0.16 km^{2})
- Max. depth: 20 ft (6.1 m)
- Shore length^{1}: 2.9 km (1.8 mi)
- Surface elevation: 187 ft (57 m)
- Islands: 2
- ^{1} Shore length is not a well-defined measure.

Elter Water is a small lake in the Lake District in North West England, half a mile southeast of the village of the same name. It has a length of 0.62 miles (1.00 km), maximum width of approximately 0.24 miles (0.39 km), a maximum depth of 7 metres (7.7 yd), and an area of 0.16 square kilometres (0.062 sq mi). Its outflow is the River Brathay, which flows south to join Windermere near Ambleside. Windermere is itself drained by the River Leven, which flows into Morecambe Bay. The lake is in the unitary authority of Westmorland and Furness and the ceremonial county of Cumbria.

Elter Water forms part of the boundary between the historic counties of Lancashire and Westmorland, and is the northernmost point of the former.

== Toponymy ==
The name Elterwater means either

- Lake of the Swan (" 'The lake frequented by swans', from Old Norse 'elptr'/'alpt' 'swan', in the genitive sing.[ular] form with '-ar', and 'water', probably replacing Old Norse 'vatn' 'lake'. Whooper swans still winter on the lake")
- or Lake of Alder.

== Ecology ==
The lake is a Site of Special Scientific Interest, but there have been problems with water quality, in particular eutrophication. Navigation is prohibited on the lake.

== Cultural references ==
Thomas Frederick Worrall painted a watercolour of the lake with Langdale Pikes in the background. This painting is hanging in the Bishop's House, Keswick.

== Bibliography ==
- Parker, John Wilson (2004). An Atlas of the English Lakes. Cicerone Press. ISBN 1-85284-355-1.
