= William Worrall =

English fabric and glass designer

William Edwin Worrall
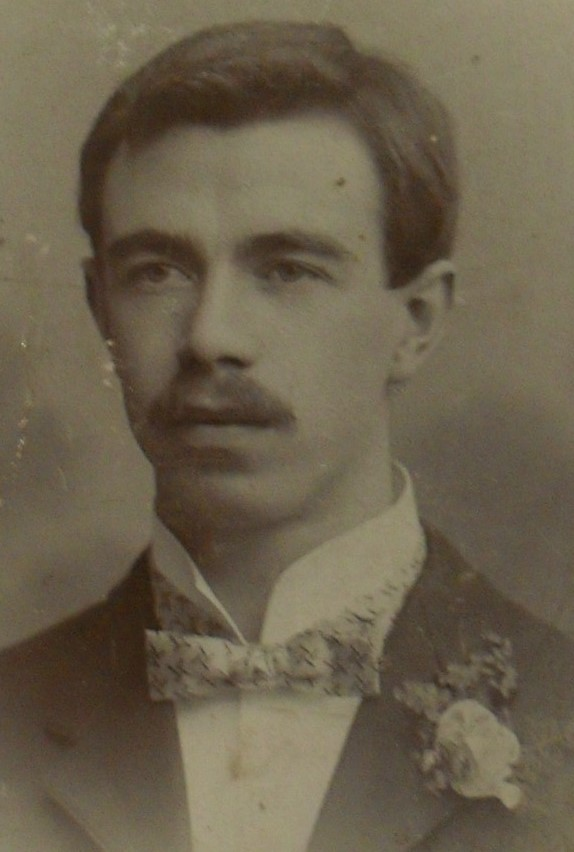
- Born: 1877; Wednesbury, England
- Died: 1940 (aged 62–63); Keswick
- Relatives: Thomas Frederick Worrall (brother)

William Edwin Worrall was a Staffordshire-born designer of fabric, pottery, glass and stoneware. He was the brother of the watercolour painter Thomas Frederick Worrall and shared similar artistic ability.

== Early life ==
William Edwin Worrall was the middle of three sons born to blacksmith Thomas Worrall senior and Susannah Worrall, in Wednesbury, Staffordshire. The family moved to Church, near Accrington, Lancashire. after leaving school, William became a cotton print designer. Whereas his elder brother, Thomas, became a blacksmith and painted watercolours as a side interest, William made creativity his paid employment.

== Later life ==
The 1891 census shows Worrall living with his mother and siblings in Church, Lancashire, working as an office boy in a cotton mill. By 1901 he was still working in the mill but was a designer of cotton prints, probably for F. Steiner & Company. Pattern books from Steiner in the collection of the Victoria and Albert Museum indicate the sort of designs that he created. Worrall later moved to Cheshire, still designing fabric prints. The England and Wales Register for 1939 shows that during the World War I, Worrall worked in the Ministry of Munitions, but nothing of his work there is known. Information about his life during the early 1920s is similarly lacking, but by 1928 he was teaching pottery at the Chalice Well Crafts Guild in Glastonbury, Somerset, which had been founded in 1912 by Alice Buckton. By 1932 Worrall was the chief craftsman there. Worrall was living at that time in the nearby newly built house, 'Stone Down', along with historical writer, Thomas N. Wild and his wife.

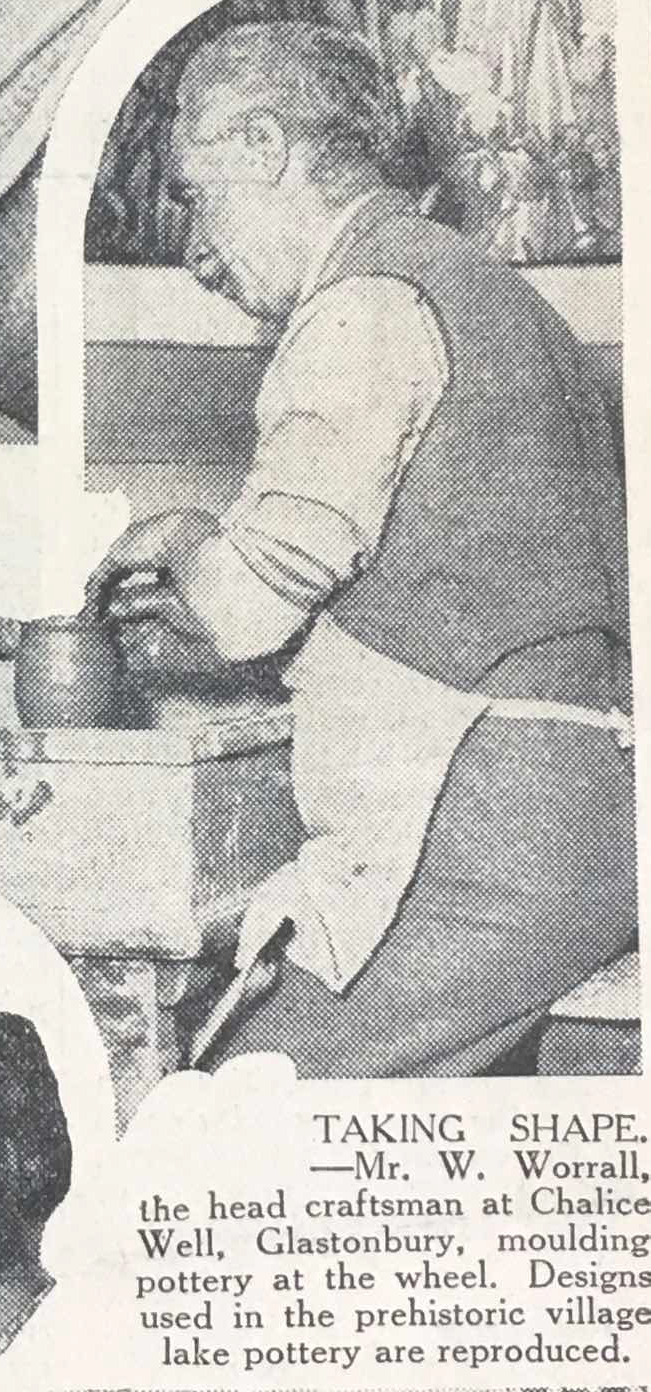
William Worrall working in Chalice Well

Worrall's years in Glastonbury were productive, and he demonstrated a move away from fabric design. He trained in pottery making under the renowned Bernard Leach, and Leach later named him as one of his principal students. In 1931, Worrall was invited to demonstrate pottery techniques at the Selfridges department store in London, and featured in an article in the American newspaper, Evening World. He also became skilled in tile-making and bronze-work and was an early member of the Somerset Guild of Craftsmen which exists to this day. He was invited by the Board of Trade to submit items for the 1937 Paris Exhibition, and sent a dish, jug and beer mug for the rural industries section. The dish incorporated an image of Glastonbury Tor. He became further known when he was commissioned to make a memorial of bronze set in stone to the famous Somerset author Walter Raymond, which was placed, and still is, in Yeovil Library. He also notably designed the renovations of St Margaret's Almshouses in Taunton, and played a significant role in life at Chalice Well in Glastonbury, being a member of that group's dramatic circle which performed plays, and he created the required stage scenery. He became very knowledgeable about local folklore, became a member of the Avalon Sister and Brotherhood, and gave lectures on the legend of Glastonbury and the Holy Grail.

== Death ==
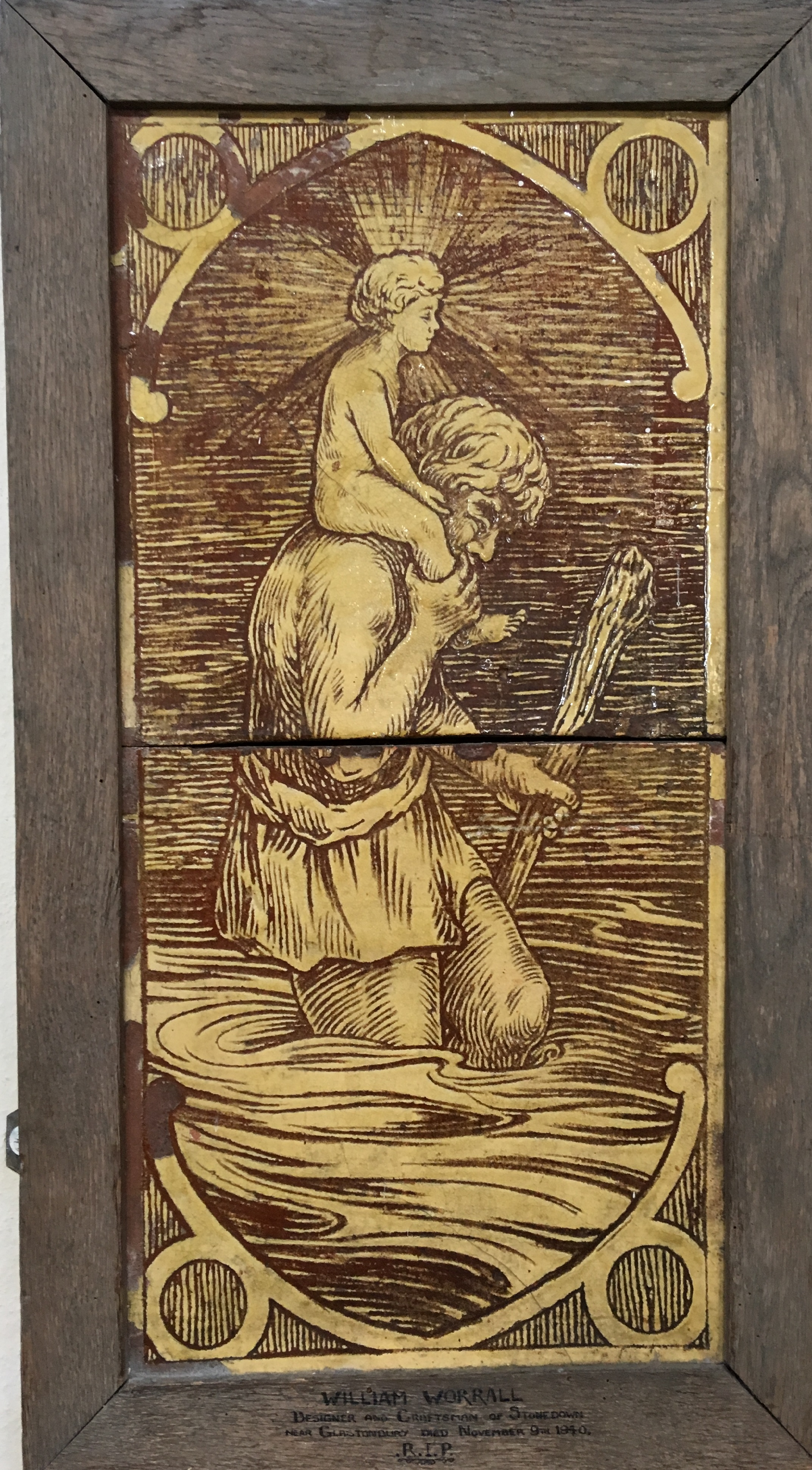
Memorial plaque to William Worrall, Glastonbury made from two of his tiles

Worrall died in the Mary Hewetson Hospital, Keswick, in 1940 while staying in the Lake District. His death certificate shows that he was suffering from myocardial degeneration (lost function of the heart muscle) and his obituary in the Central Somerset Gazette states that he had been in the Lake District for three months in the hope that the clean air would improve his heart complaint. He is buried in St Kentigern's Church churchyard in Crosthwaite, on the outskirts of Keswick.

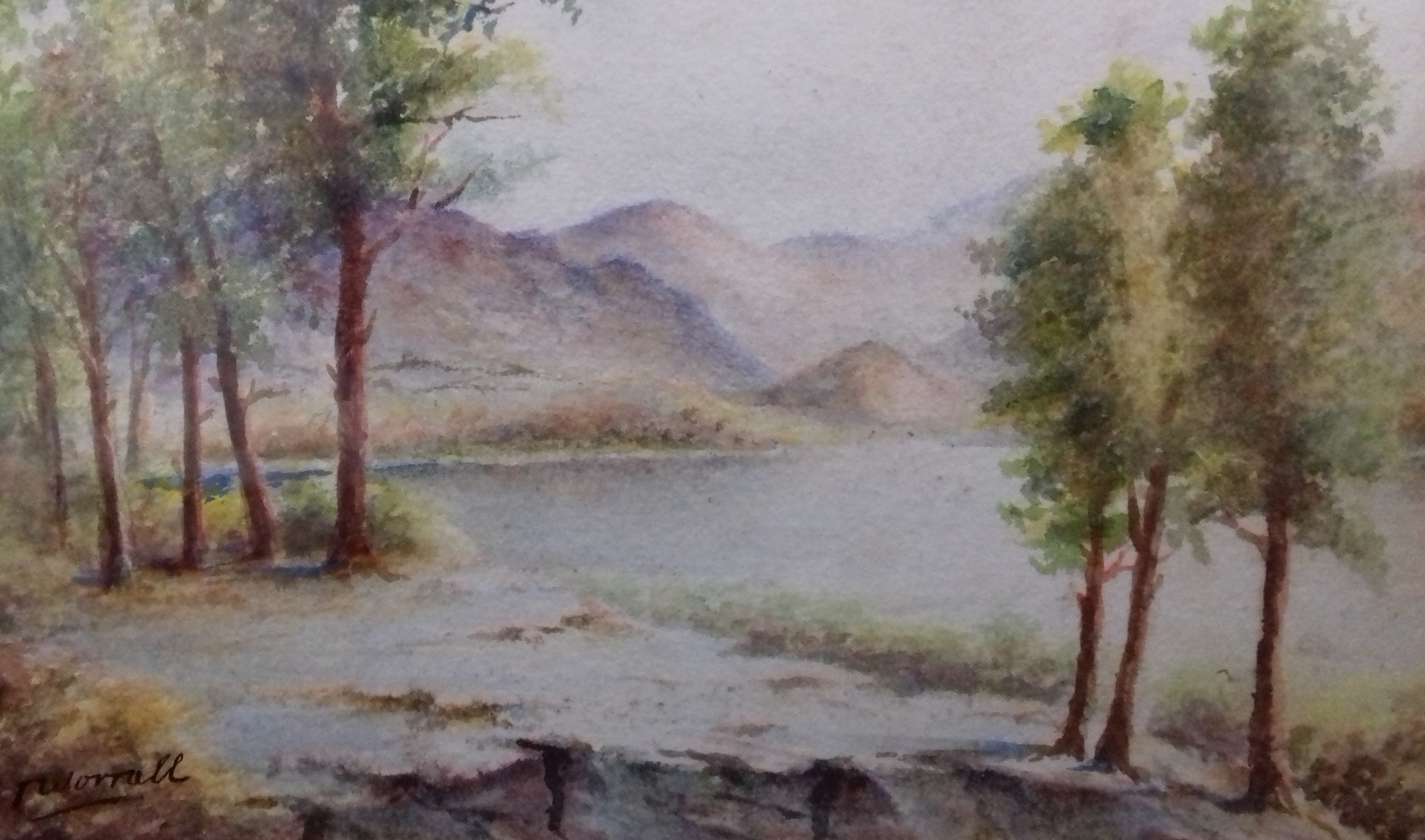
Thomas Worrall's painting of Derwentwater from Friars' Crag (1947) near to his brother William's final resting place

There is a plaque to Worrall in St John's Church in Glastonbury on which the dedication reads: William Worrall Designer and craftsman of Stone Down Near Glastonbury Died November 9th 1940. RIP. The plaque consists of two of Worrall's handmade tiles and shows St. Christopher carrying the child Jesus. The Central Somerset Gazette obituary says that Worrall readily gave gentle counsel to those seeking spiritual guidance, and that it is the results from this work in the hearts of those people 'that is his best and truest memorial'.

Worrall's elder brother, Thomas, visited the grave in Keswick in 1947 and took the opportunity of painting nearby scenes.

== Works in public collections ==
- Two ceramic tiles – St John's Church, Glastonbury, Somerset
- Plaque to Walter Raymond (bronze), Yeovil Public Library, Somerset
- St Margaret's Almshouses, Taunton, Somerset
