= John Sowerby (botanist) =

British botanist

- Born: 1823
- Died: 1902 (aged 78–79)
- Occupation: Schoolmaster and botanist
- Period: 1874-1892
- Subject: Alpine districts, botany, and topography
- Notable works: The Forest Cantons of Switzerland (1892)

John Sowerby M.A. (18 September 1823 – 8 December 1902) was an English botanist, writer, and early member of the Alpine Club.

== Early life ==
John Sowerby was born in Sunderland, County Durham, the son of Jeremiah Sowerby and his wife, Ann (nee Slee). He had a twin sister, Anna, with whom he remained close all his life.

His parents came from the Lake District and had married at Dacre, Cumberland, in 1816. His father was a chemist, and his mother was the daughter of a Cumberland farmer.

His parents retained an attachment to Cumberland, retiring to Wetheral, where John’s father died in 1854. John’s early interest in hill walking owed much to their influence.

== Cambridge, India, and Marlborough ==
In 1842, John was admitted to Trinity College, Cambridge, to study classics. In his second year, he changed to mathematics, which proved advantageous as in 1846, he won a scholarship, and in 1847, he achieved the ranking of 41st wrangler.

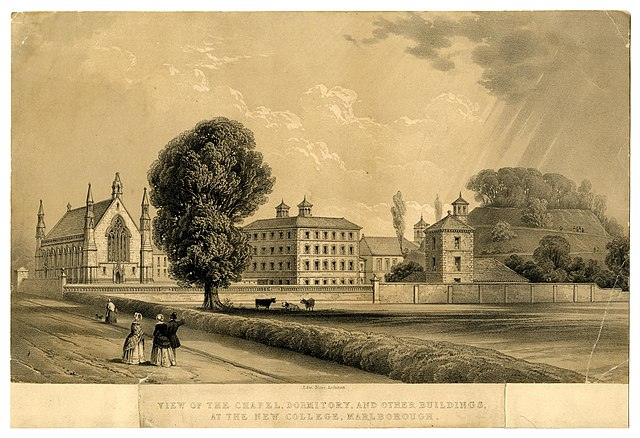
Marlborough College Chapel and Dormitory

He was tall and strong, with red hair and abundant energy, always active, whether walking, solving mathematical problems, devouring French and German fiction, or teaching himself Italian and Hebrew.

In February 1847, he was appointed a mathematical tutor at Bishop’s College, Calcutta, India.

After a short-lived posting, he returned to England and, in 1849, became an assistant master at Marlborough College. Following the College’s ethos, he opted to take Holy Orders and was ordained deacon at Salisbury in May 1850 and priest one year later.

While at Marlborough, he was part of a coordinated drive to raise standards and improve the boys' welfare. He found new ways to teach geography by drawing maps to convey essential facts. He also helped boys who floundered at games by putting them in a team nicknamed “Sowerby’s Eleven” and giving them special coaching. Both fellow teachers and boys alike warmed to his good-hearted nature, wit, and even temper.

Following his father’s death in 1854, his mother moved to Marlborough, where she lived in a house overlooking Savernake Forest. She died in 1865, aged 75.

In his mid-thirties, John was introduced to botany by Thomas Arthur Preston, a fellow master at the college. This activity suited his aptitude for exploring, observing, and recording. The men struck up a life-long friendship, and when Preston wrote a book on the flowering plants of Wiltshire, John contributed a chapter on the county’s topography.

== Alpine expeditions ==
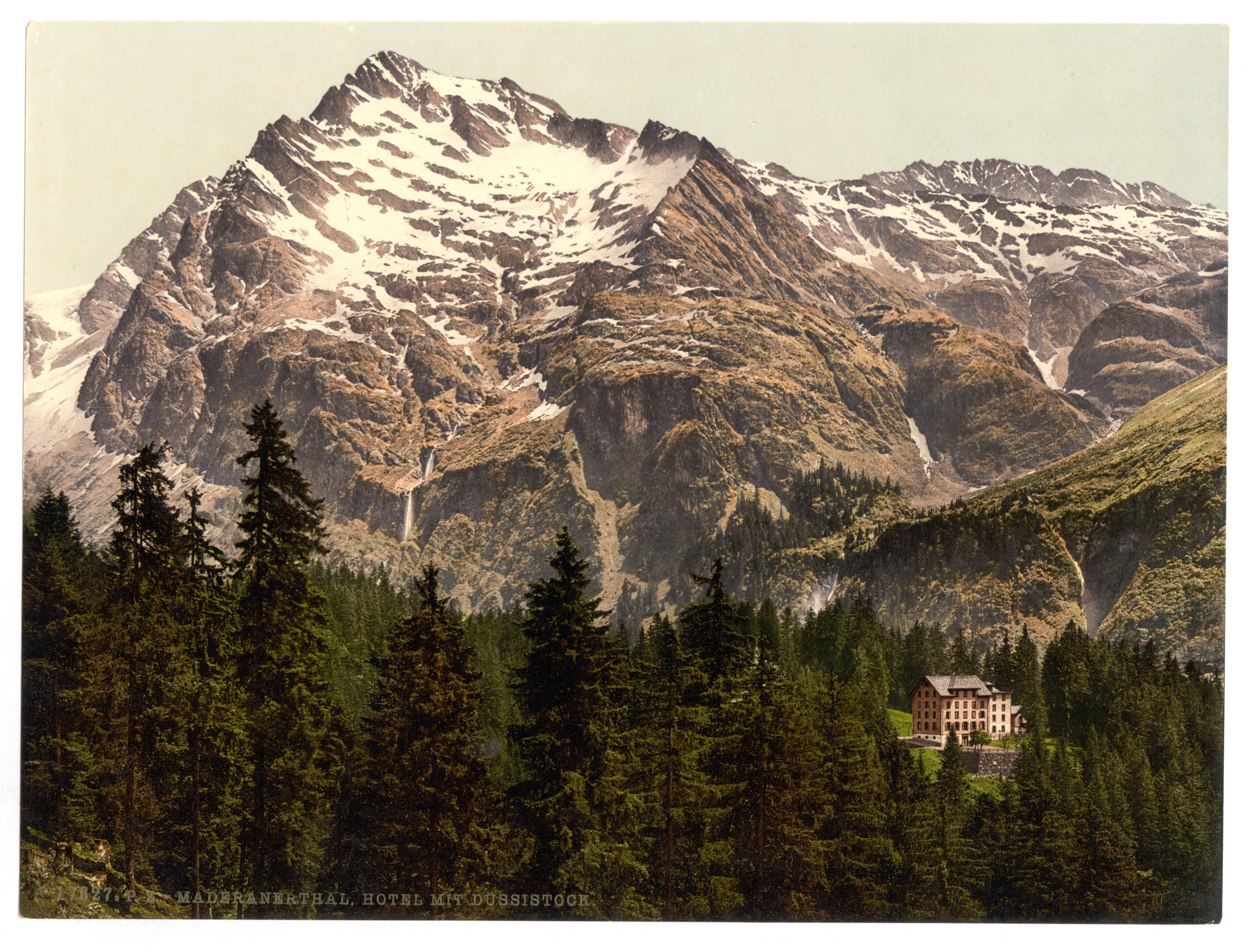
Maderanerthal, Switzerland

In 1860, John and his friend Preston went to the Alps during the summer holidays to study plants. He became fascinated by the area and returned there year after year.

Other masters at Marlborough often joined him, namely William Grylls Adams, Waldemar Mansell, and Francis Edward Thompson. In practice, the college became a hub for early Alpine exploration.

On these trips, John explored the mountains and glaciers, collected plants, sketched scenery, drew maps, and acquired a comprehensive knowledge of the area's geography, history, and culture. He was an early member of the Alpine Club and wrote several articles for its journal, including one on the Maderanerthal, an area he helped popularise. In 1892, he published The Forest Cantons of Switzerland, a guide for tourists, full of detailed information about the region, including a history of the William Tell legend.

== Preston Plucknett ==
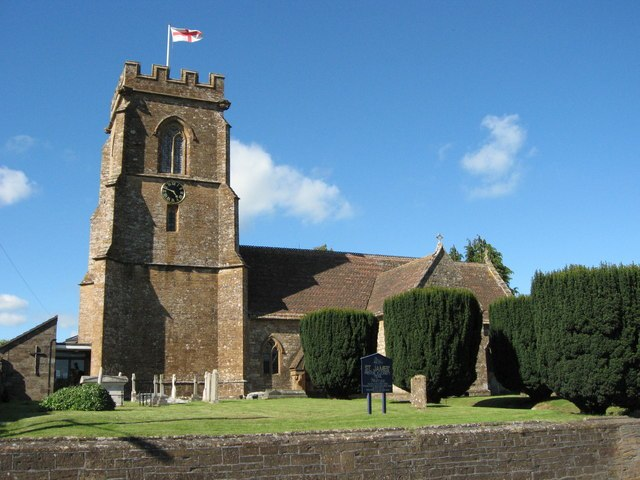
The Church of St James, Preston Plucknett

In 1874, he left Marlborough to become the vicar of Preston Plucknett, near Yeovil, where he remained until 1884. The position was a virtual sinecure as he delegated many of his duties to others and spent long periods abroad.

While at Preston, he roamed the countryside, noting all the plants he found, including Wood Hawkweed in a copse near Norton, Zigzag Clover in Pen Wood, and Yellow Minimus in a deserted garden south of Leigh. In a letter to the editor of the local newspaper, he reported having seen 641 different flowering plants, grasses, and ferns in the neighbourhood.

He also applied his map drawing skills to educate the public about the progress of South African wars, exhibiting a map in a bookseller’s window to show the disposition of troops and updating it regularly.

== Life abroad ==
While at Preston, his stays in the Alps became more prolonged, and in 1884, he left England to live abroad, staying in Switzerland, the Tyrol, northern Italy, or the French Riviera, as his mood took him. He remained physically fit for most of his life, walking along Striding Edge in winter when he was 74. His nephew, Walter, shared his love of mountains and sometimes accompanied him on his later expeditions.

Towards the end of his life, his summer home was at Gries am Brenner, Austria, and his winter home was at Bozen, Italy. He died at Bozen on 8 December 1902, aged 79.

== Books and articles ==
- "Round the Maderanerthal," The Alpine Journal, vi, pp. 321–44 (February 1874).
- "The Grosse Windgelle," The Alpine Journal, vii, pp. 266–67 (August 1875).
- "The Wolfendorn 'Kind,'" The Alpine Journal, xiii, pp. 479–81 (February 1888).
- "Topography", chapter 1 of Preston, Thomas Arthur, The Flowering Plants of Wilts (Wiltshire Archaeological and Natural History Society, 1888).
- The Forest Cantons of Switzerland (Percival & Co, London, 1892).
