= Thomas Frederick Worrall =

British painter (b. 1872, d. 1957)

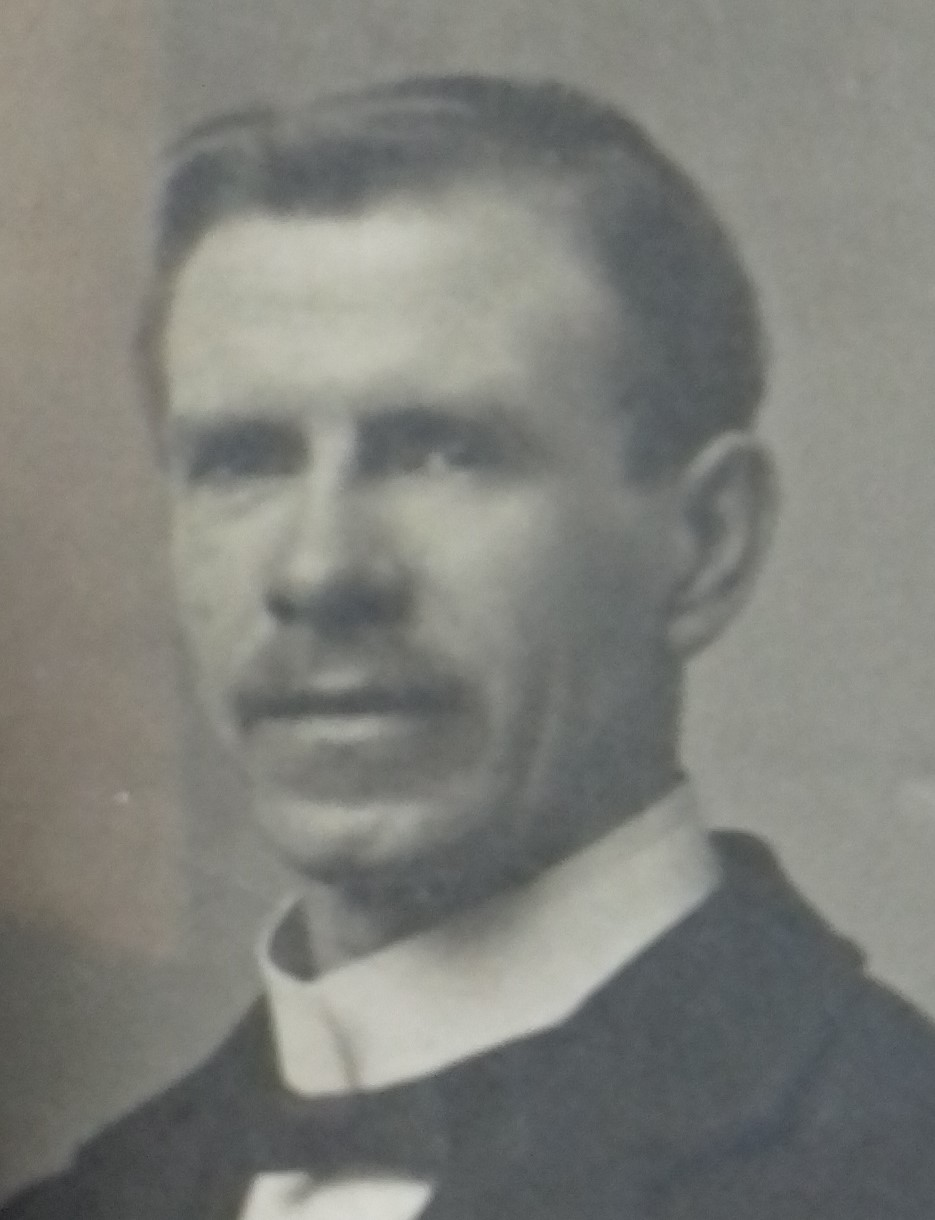
- Thomas F Worrall on his wedding day, 1899
- Born: 1872; Wednesbury, Staffordshire (now West Midlands), England, UK
- Died: 1957 (aged 84–85); Barry, Vale of Glamorgan, Wales, UK
- Occupation: Artist
- Known for: Watercolours

Thomas Frederick Worrall (1872–1957) was a Staffordshire-born manual worker and watercolourist. He lived for a time in Lancashire and in the upper Calder Valley area of Yorkshire but spent most of his adult life in Barry, in South Wales, where he was also deeply involved in politics and stood for parliament in the general election of 1923 representing the Labour Party. He was the elder brother of the pottery and fabric designer William Worrall.

== Early life ==
Worrall was born in Wednesbury, the son of Thomas Worrall, a blacksmith. Thomas Frederick was the eldest of three boys but had two step sisters and a step brother. The family lived in the Woods Bank area of Darlaston which was heavily industrialized, with foundries, mines and metal works. They lived on the side of a tramway that connected various metal-working plants, and this tramway formed the site of what is now Moxley Road. By the early 1890s the whole family had moved to the village of Church in the county of Lancashire, where the elder siblings were involved in local industries. Worrall senior, however, worked for a time as a blacksmith in Cheshire so was living away from the family. Although the centre of Church was heavily built up, with close-packed, terraced housing and many mills, foundries and chemical works, the Worralls lived in Dill Hall Lane which was surrounded by fields and pleasant views of countryside. There was a vista from their house across the Leeds and Liverpool Canal to Dunkenhalgh Park. Thomas Frederick married Martha Green in the spring of 1899 and their first-born was Robert, born in 1900. Martha's family had built the Albion Mill, which became known locally as Green's Mill,

It was while a young man in the north of England that Worrall's artistic leanings emerged. He attended art lessons in Manchester and created a series of watercolours of local scenes including Priestly Clough and Fern Gore, both in nearby Accrington, and Stoodley Pike in Yorkshire (see list of works, below). There is a photograph of him aged about 20 years in Haslingden public library, labelled Tom Worrall, artist. Not all of his pieces are signed, but when he did so he generally used the signature T. Worrall or sometimes the initials "TW". Artistic ability and an eye for colour was clearly a family trait as Worrall's brother William became a cotton print designer, and his youngest brother, Simeon, a painter and decorator.

By the time he was in his late twenties, T.F. Worrall was a working as a blacksmith in the neighbouring county of Yorkshire, at a quarry in Southowram. This was a much less industrialized part of the country, indeed the family's residence was “West Fields” adjacent to farmland. There were more children, with daughters Bertha and Mary born in 1902 and 1906 respectively. Worrall continued to work as a blacksmith, but was a journeyman, not a master.

== Later life ==
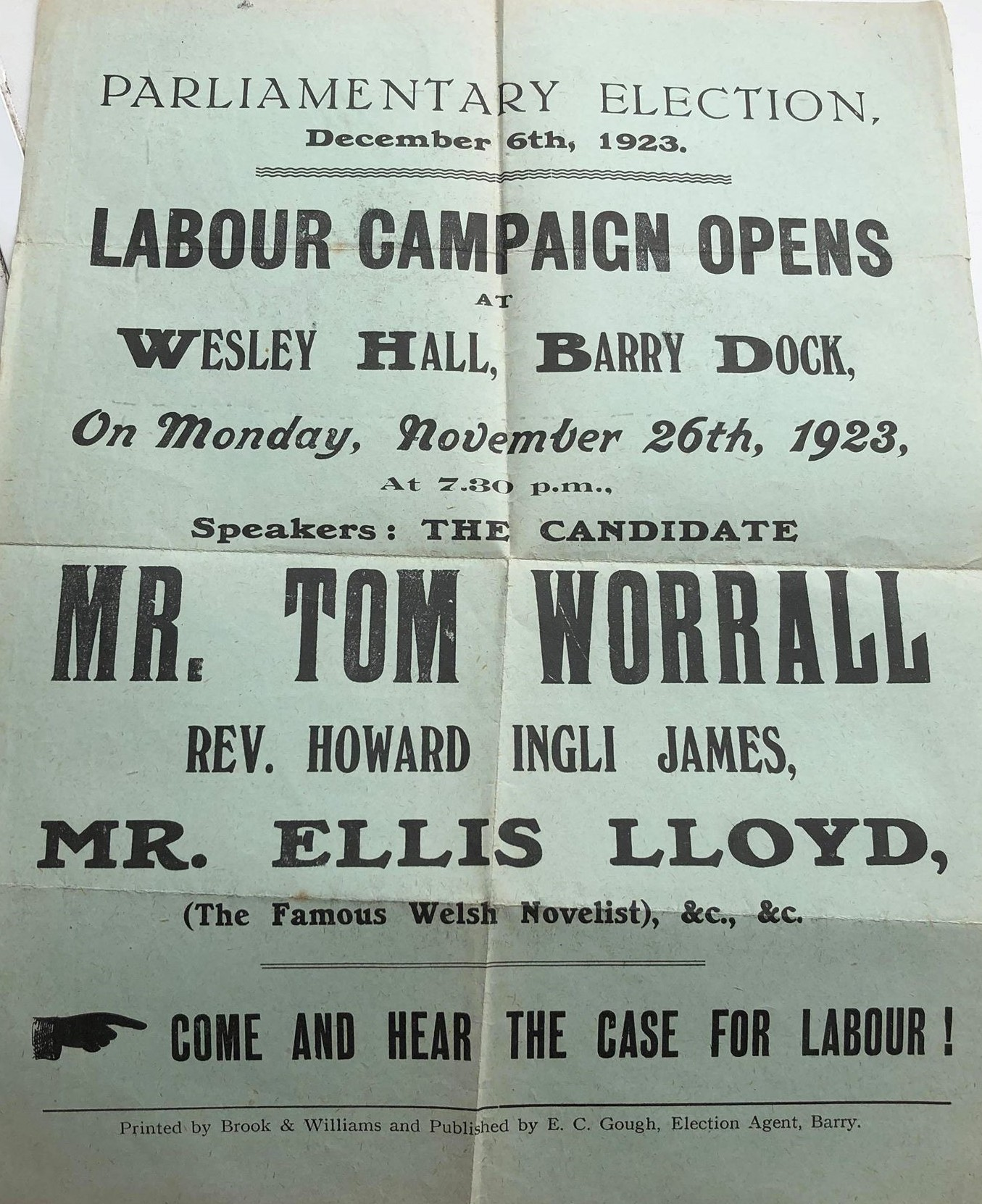
Worrall's election poster, 1923

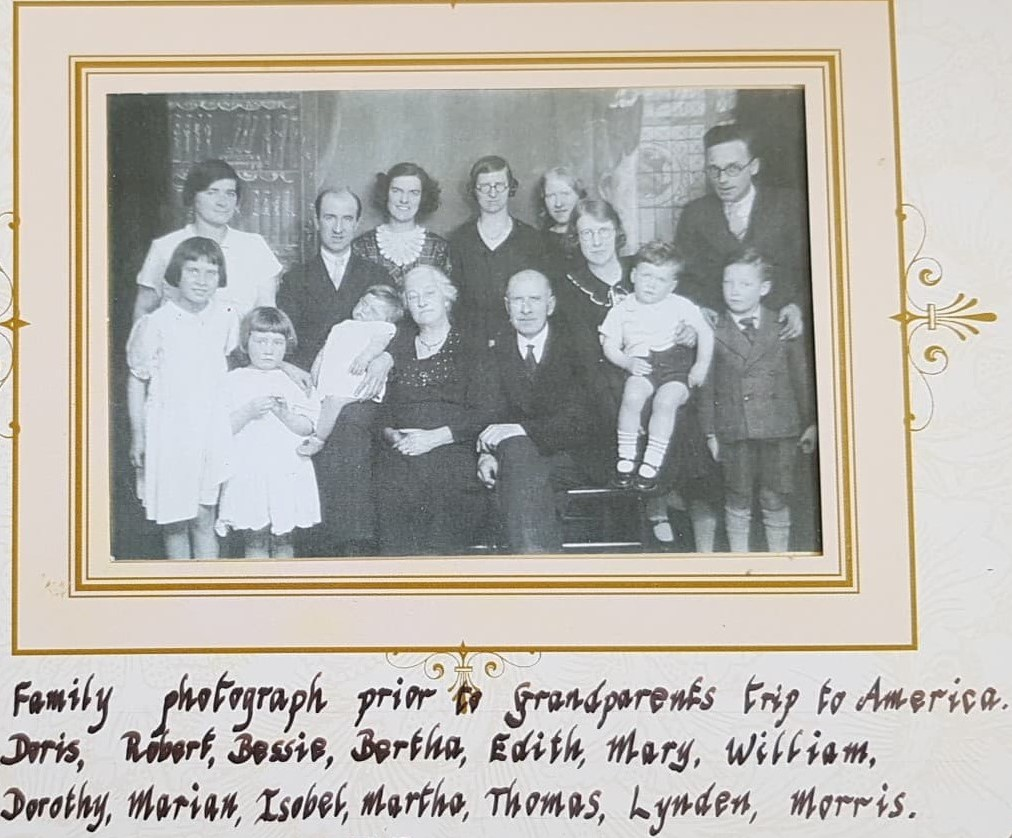
Thomas and Martha with their offspring, son- and daughter-in law and grandchildren

The family moved again, this time to south Wales, where Thomas Frederick now began to work as a gas fitter. Their residence in 1911 was a terraced house, typical of the type found in the industrialized south Wales valleys but their village, Nelson, was semi-rural and surrounded by views of distant coasts and mountains. Once again, as in Darlaston, they lived alongside a tramway that now forms the base of a metalled road, namely Crescent Street. They named their terraced house Primrose Cottage, which still exists. Worrall had visited this part of the country in 1910 to address meetings of socialists, illustrating his interest in left-wing politics, supporting at that time the Independent Labour Party. He was a committed trade unionist and spoke out against a speaker at a political meeting who was trying to denigrate the miners' union and who was using antisemitic language. He attended the I.L.P. conferences in 1906 and 1907 and addressed the delegates. The south Wales years were Worrall's most active as a painter and when the family moved to live in the small town of Barry, South Wales on the coast, his portfolio grew to include many observations of nearby maritime areas as well as further inland and further away. The Worrall residence in Cardiff Road, gave a view over Swanbridge Bay and Sully Island which inspired many depictions of that seascape.

Although it was work firstly as a time keeper then as a store man in the new cement plant to the west of the town that first occupied him, Worrall returned to working with gas. He became an oxy-acetylene welder and lived in Barry until the end of his life, latterly in Hywel Crescent, and painted numerous images of local scenes. His family expanded too, with daughters Bessie and Edith born in 1913 and 1916 respectively. He became increasingly politically active, was secretary of the Barry Labour Representative Committee, and tried to be selected as the Labour Party candidate for the Llandaff and Barry constituency in 1918. He was unsuccessful on that occasion but was selected and stood in the 1923 general election. He received nearly 8000 votes but came third behind the Unionist and Liberal contenders. He attended the I.L.P. annual conference in 1925.

During this time Worrall made visits back to Lancashire and painted scenes including the war memorial in Great Harwood which had been unveiled in 1926. He and his wife and elder children attended Workers Educational Association courses in Oxford which gave him opportunities to sketch scenes of the waterways and colleges, and visits to his two brothers in London and Glastonbury provided further potential for artistic work. After retirement from gas fitting, Worrall collected subscriptions for the Barry and District Co-operative and Industrial Society, a group in which he was a committee member until 1948.

In 1938 he and his wife travelled to the United States where he created a collection of scenes including around Niagara, the Potomac, Blue Ridge Mountains and the Californian and New Mexico deserts. Worrall also travelled to Greece and Italy, working as a stevedore to help fund the ventures, and some art from this period exists in private collections. By this time his creative work had moved away from mostly industrial and urban scenes to generally picturesque rural landscapes and included settings in the Lake District, Cornwall and Somerset. His depictions often included water, and he frequently used the technique of placing a house and/or tree in the foreground or middle distance. A good example of this is his painting of Stoodley Pike in Yorkshire, currently on display in Todmorden public library.

Worrall sometimes used family visits as opportunities for art work. For example, a family get together in Haslingden in 1936 was a chance to paint scenes of West Yorkshire; visits to his daughter, Edith, who obtained a teaching post in Clitheroe led to depictions of the countryside around the River Whalley; and his brother's death and burial in Keswick led to Lake District landscapes. A visit to his brother-in-law in Mt. Rainier, Maryland, gave rise to paintings of the River Potomac, which are now in Washington DC Public Library, Killingley library and Brunswick Heritage Museum in Washington D.C.

Worrall suffered from stomach cancer and died of heart failure in 1957 at home at 7 Hywel Drive, Barry. His daughter, Bertha was present and reported the death to the local registrar. He is buried in Merthyr Dyfan cemetery in Barry. There is no headstone.

== Works in public collections ==
- Scenes of the Potomac and Washington – Washington DC Public Library, Special Collections.
- Scenes of the Potomac – Brunswick Heritage Museum, Maryland, US.
- River in Danielson, Connecticut – Killingly Public Library, Connecticut, US
- Goat Island, Niagara – Niagara Falls Library, Ontario, Canada
- Priestly Clough and Fern Gore – held at Accrington Library
- Stoodley Pike from Pecket Well – Todmorden Library
- Merthyr Dyfan Church – in possession of the Church in Wales
- View of the Atlantic from SS Laconia – Sayers Collection of Ocean Liner Ephemera, Bodleian Library, Oxford
- Tintern Abbey – Gwent Archives
- Elterwater Tarn, and view of Derwentwater, Lake District – Bishop of Carlisle's office, Keswick
- Sketch book containing various scenes including Monmouthshire, Pembrokeshire, Lancashire and Oxfordshire – Gwent Archives
- Llancaiach Fawr Manor – on display in the manor house in Nelson, South Wales
- Mumbles Lighthouse – Oystermouth Library
- Fifteen views of south Wales including Cwm-yr-Eglwys, Merthyr Dyfan and Porthkerry Park – National Library of Wales

== Gallery ==
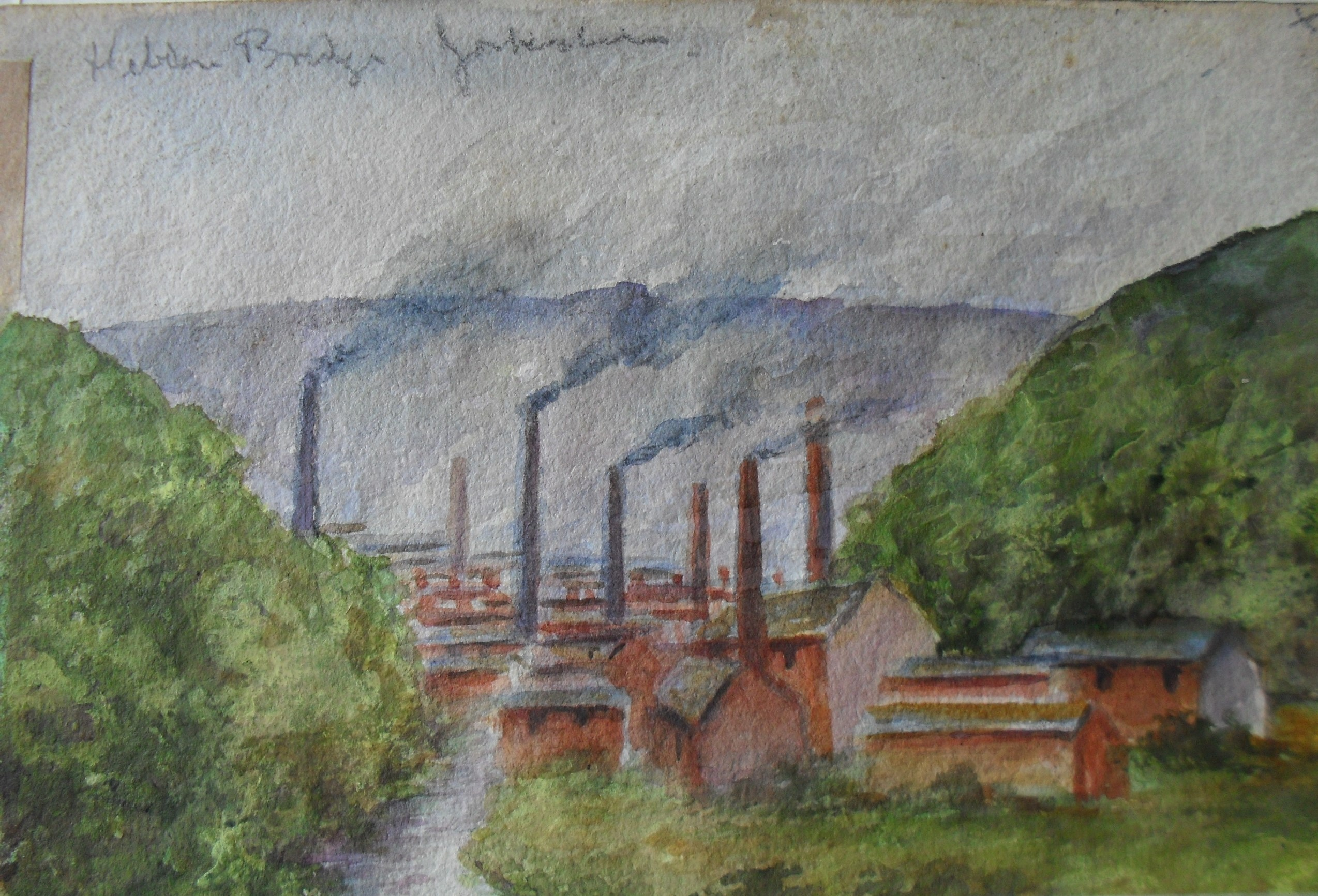
Hebden Bridge, undated

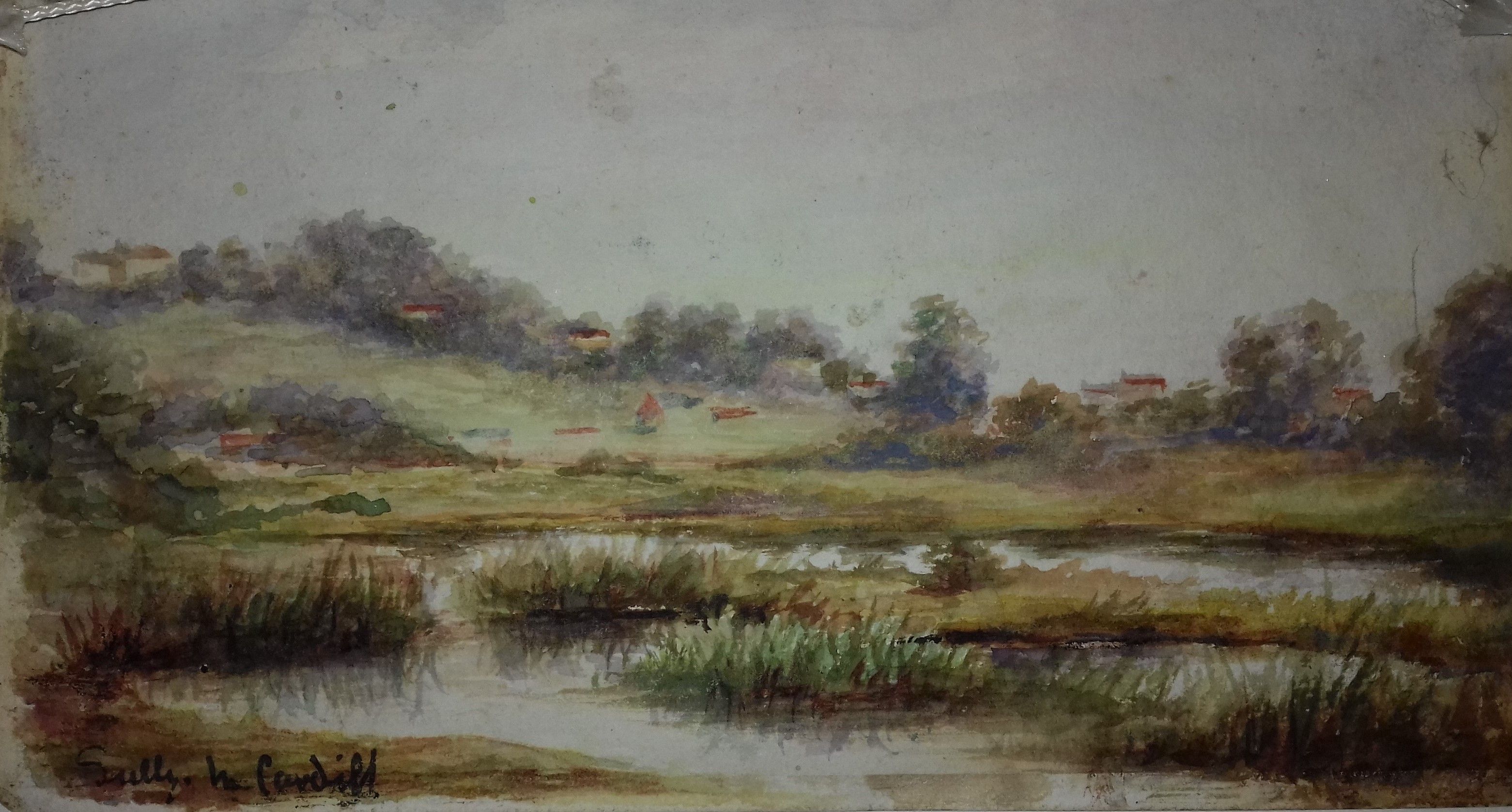
View from 79 Cardiff Road, Barry towards the village of Sully (undated). Sully Moors in foreground

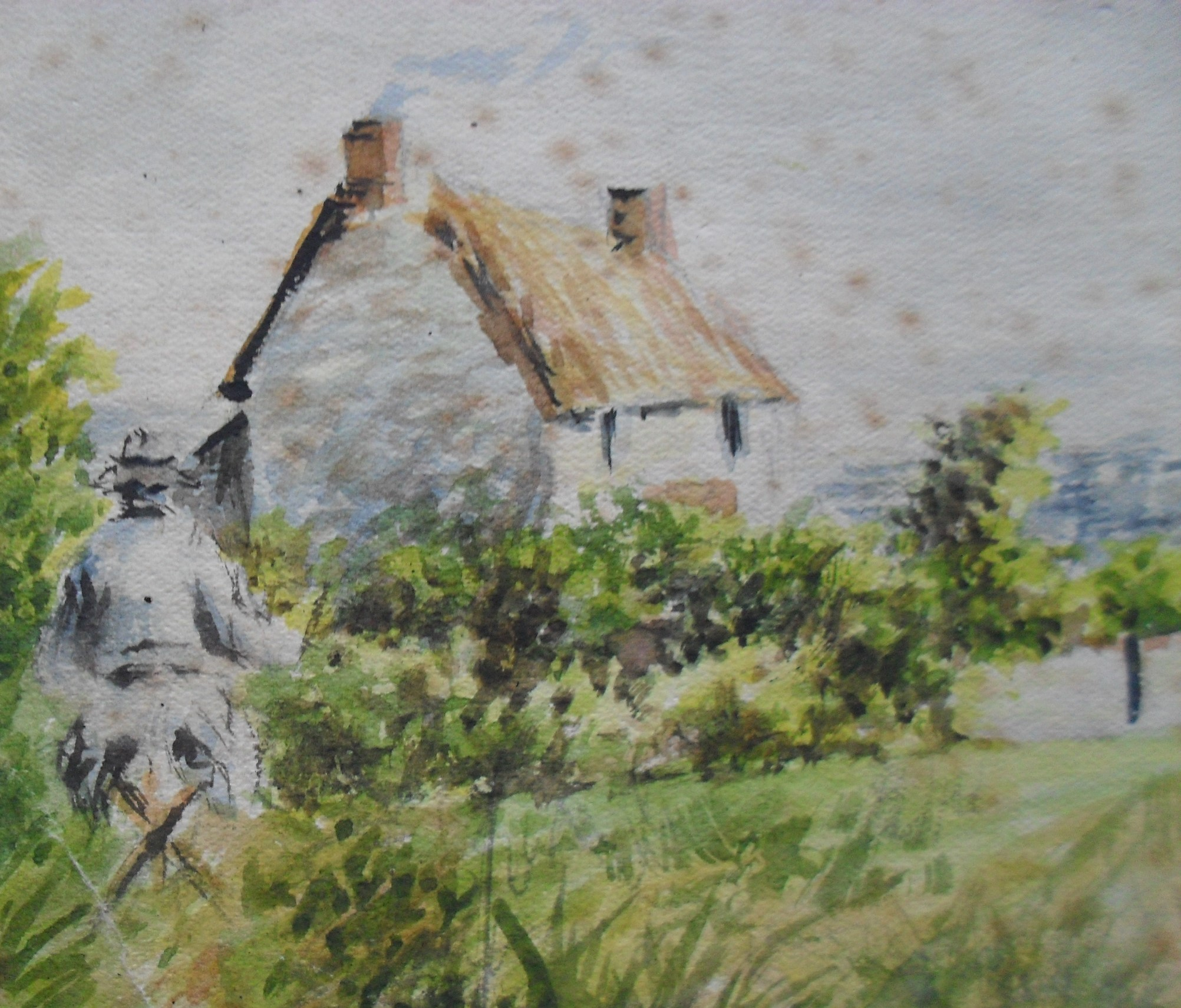
Worrall's depiction of himself

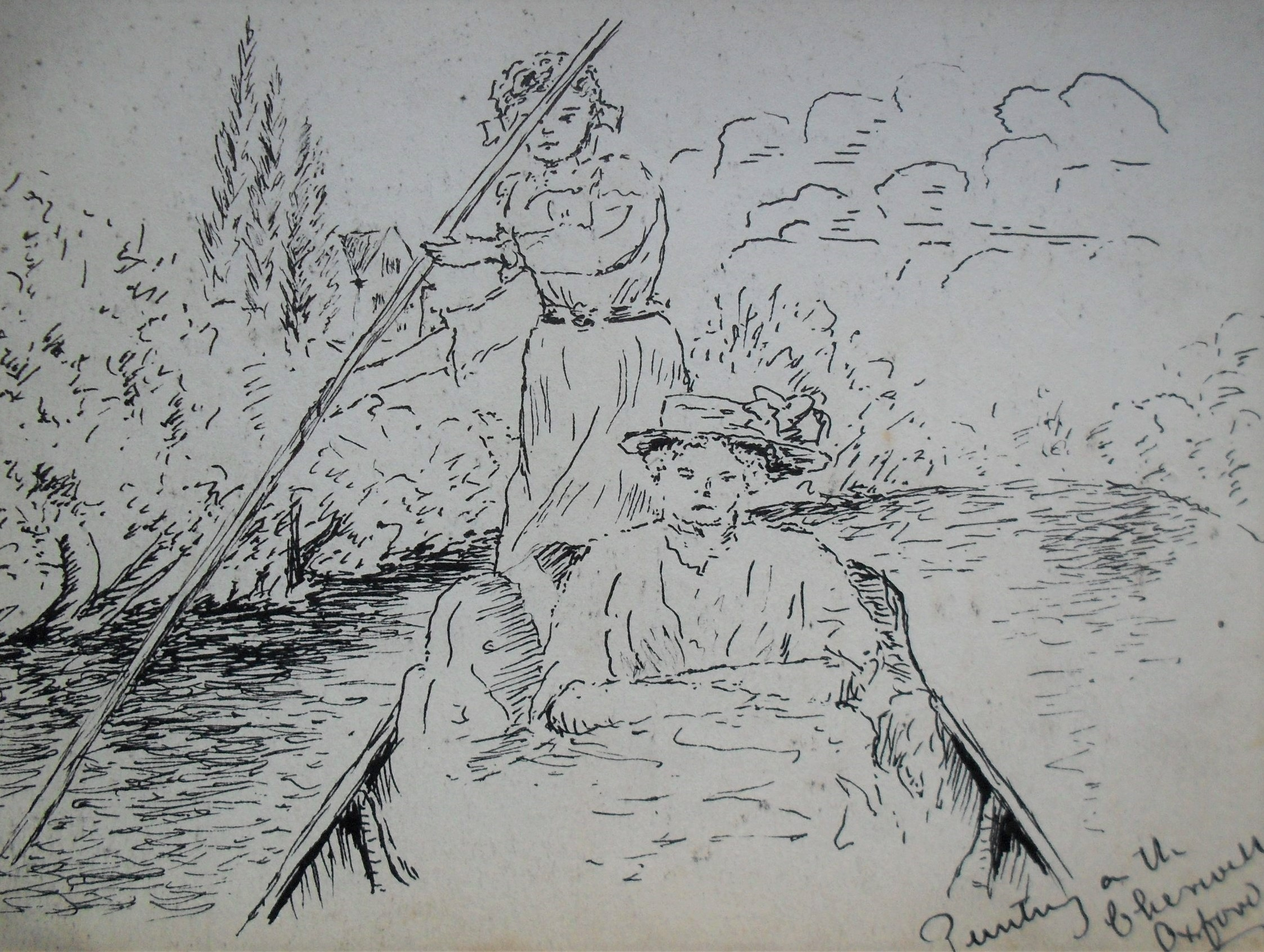
Martha and Bertha Worrall punting on the Cherwell at Oxford, c. 1918

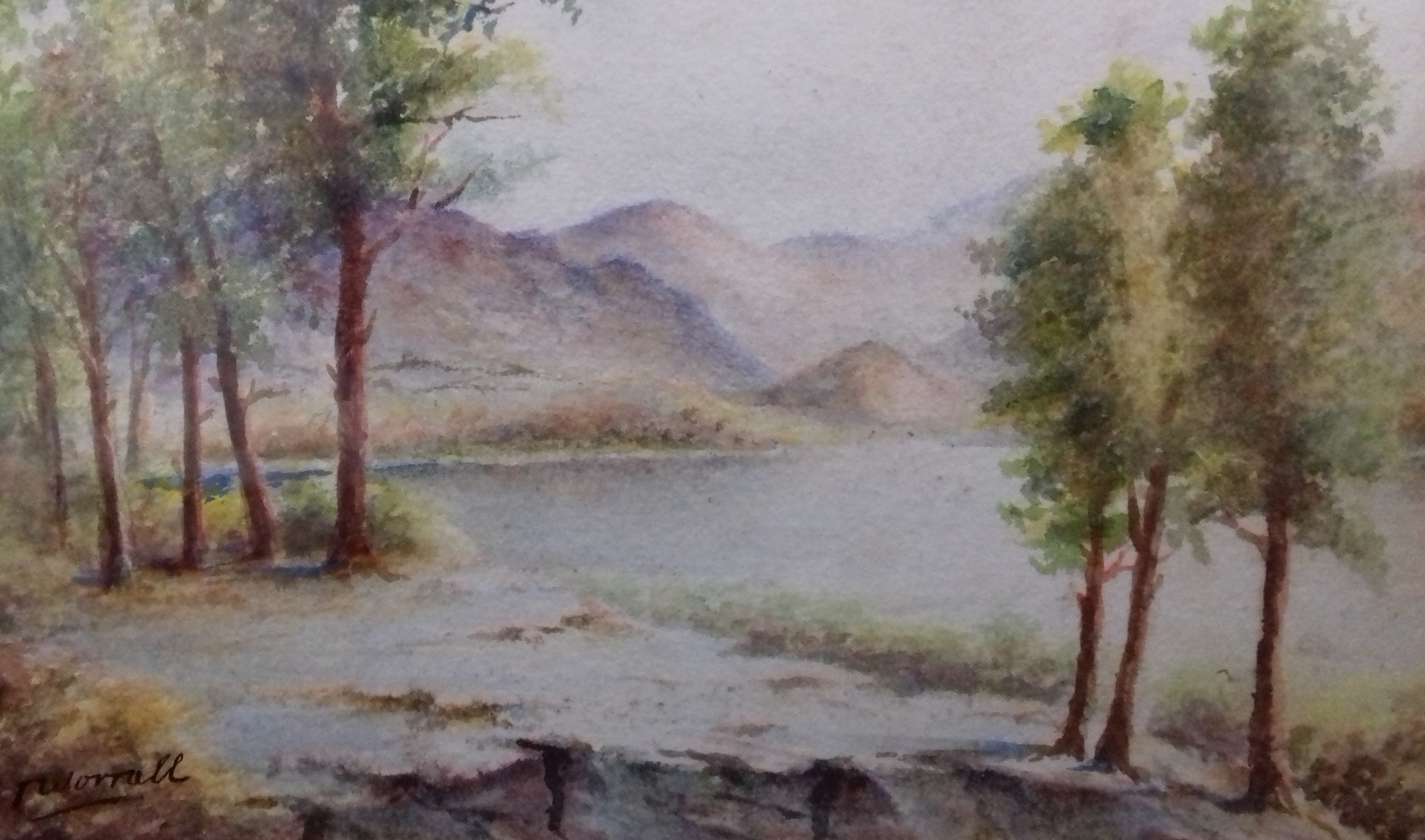
Derwentwater, Lake District, 1947

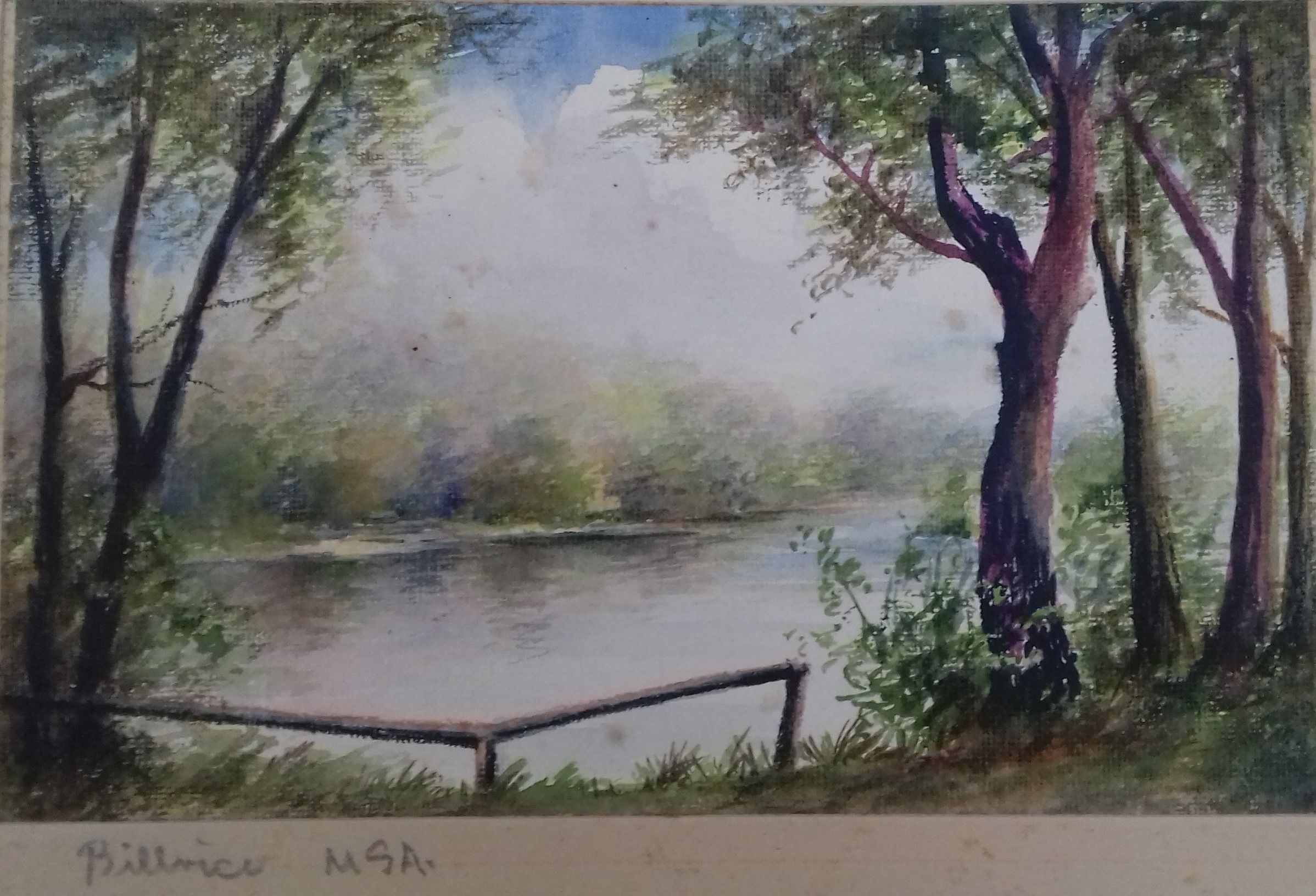
Billerica, USA (1938)

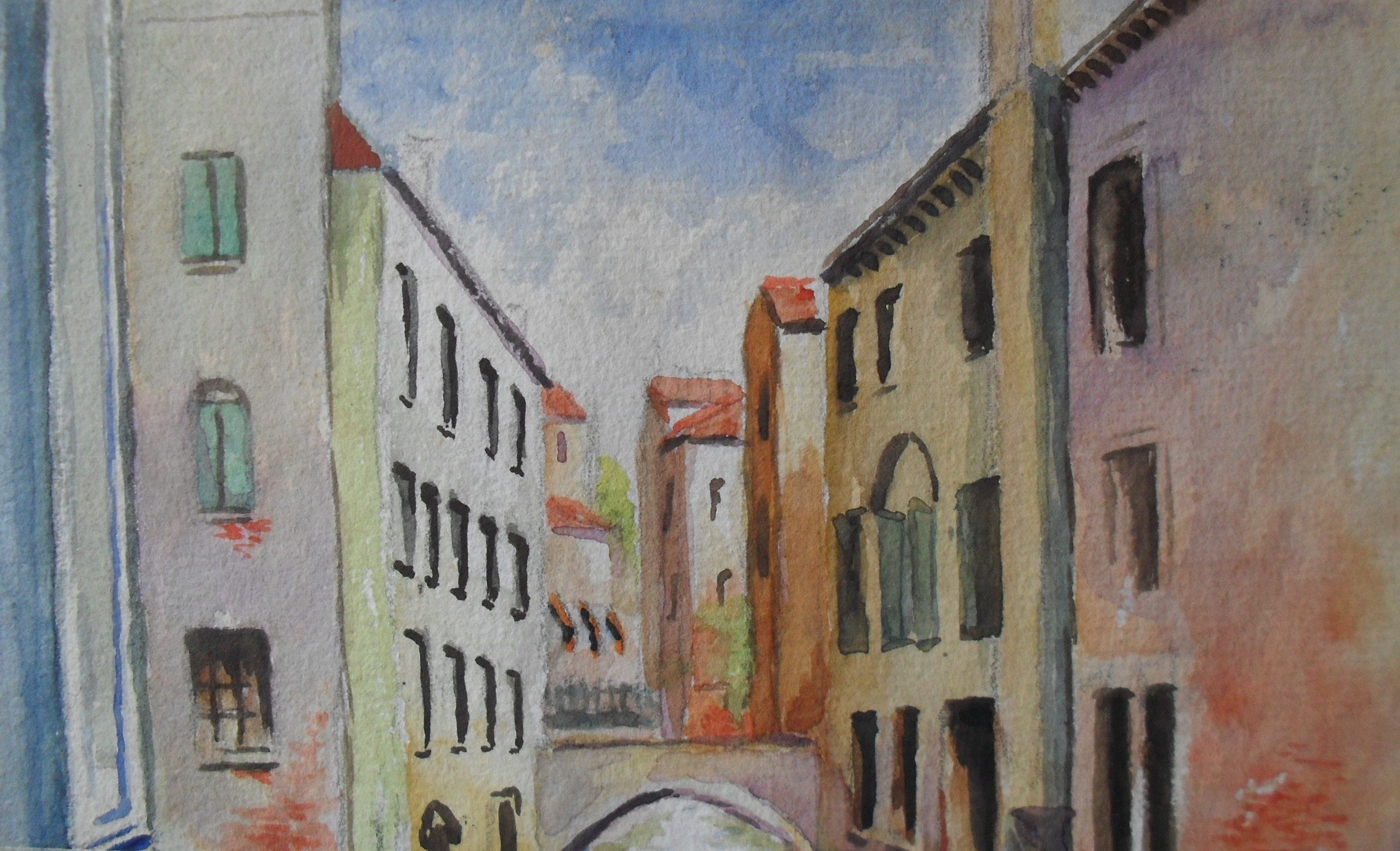
Venice, undated
