= Walter Raymond =

English novelist

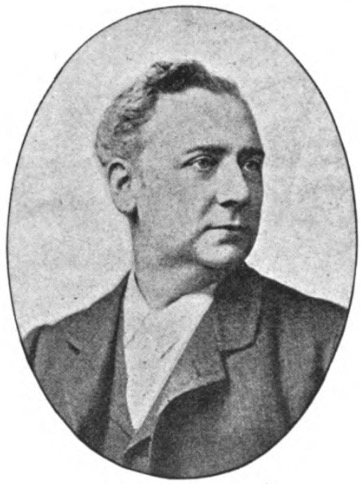
- Raymond in February 1895 edition of The Bookman (New York)
- Born: 13 March 1852
- Died: 2 April 1931 (aged 79); Southampton, England
- Occupation: Novelist
- Spouse: Mary Johnston
- Children: 8

Walter Raymond (13 March 1852 – 2 April 1931) was an English novelist.

He wrote many novels between 1890 and 1928, primarily based in Somerset, and also wrote under the pseudonym Tom Cobbleigh. Some of his titles include Gentleman Upcott's Daughter (1892), Love and Quiet Life (1894), Fortune's Darling (1901), and Verity Thurston (1926).

Walter Raymond married Mary Johnston in 1878. They had five daughters and three sons. He died in Southampton on 2 April 1931 at the age of 79. There is a memorial to him in Yeovil Public Library in Somerset, designed by William Worrall.

Raymond's work is long out of print and currently gets little attention, although some novels are now available for free online.

One of Walter Raymond's first cousins was William Raymond. See latest news

== Selected publications ==
- Raymond, Walter (1894). Love and quiet life.
- Raymond, Walter (1895). Tryphena in love.
- Raymond, Walter (1895). In the smoke of war; a story of civil strife.
- Charity Chance. 1896.
- Raymond, Walter (1899). Two men o' Mendip.
- A tangled web. 1899.
- Raymond, Walter (1906). The book of simple delights.
- Raymond, Walter (1907). The book of crafts and character.
- English country life. 1910. Raymond, Walter (1911). 1911 edition.
- The revenues of the wicked. 1911.

=== as Tom Cobbleigh ===
- Taken at his word. 1892. Vol. 2
- Raymond, Walter (1893). Gentleman Upcott's daughter.
