= Chilthorne Domer =

Village and civil parish in Somerset, England

Coordinates: 50.9729°N 2.6778°W

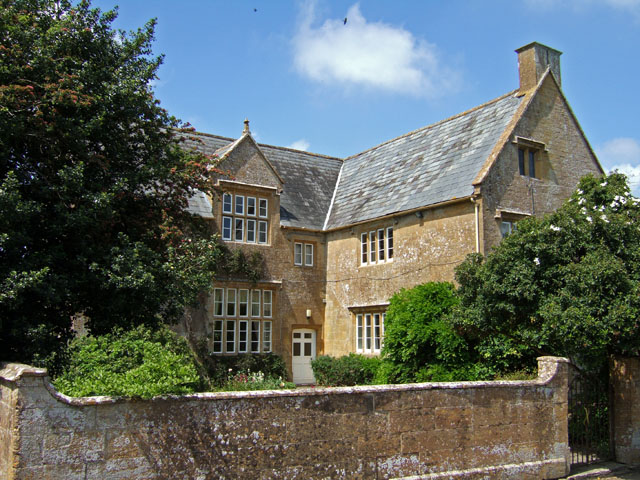
- Manor House

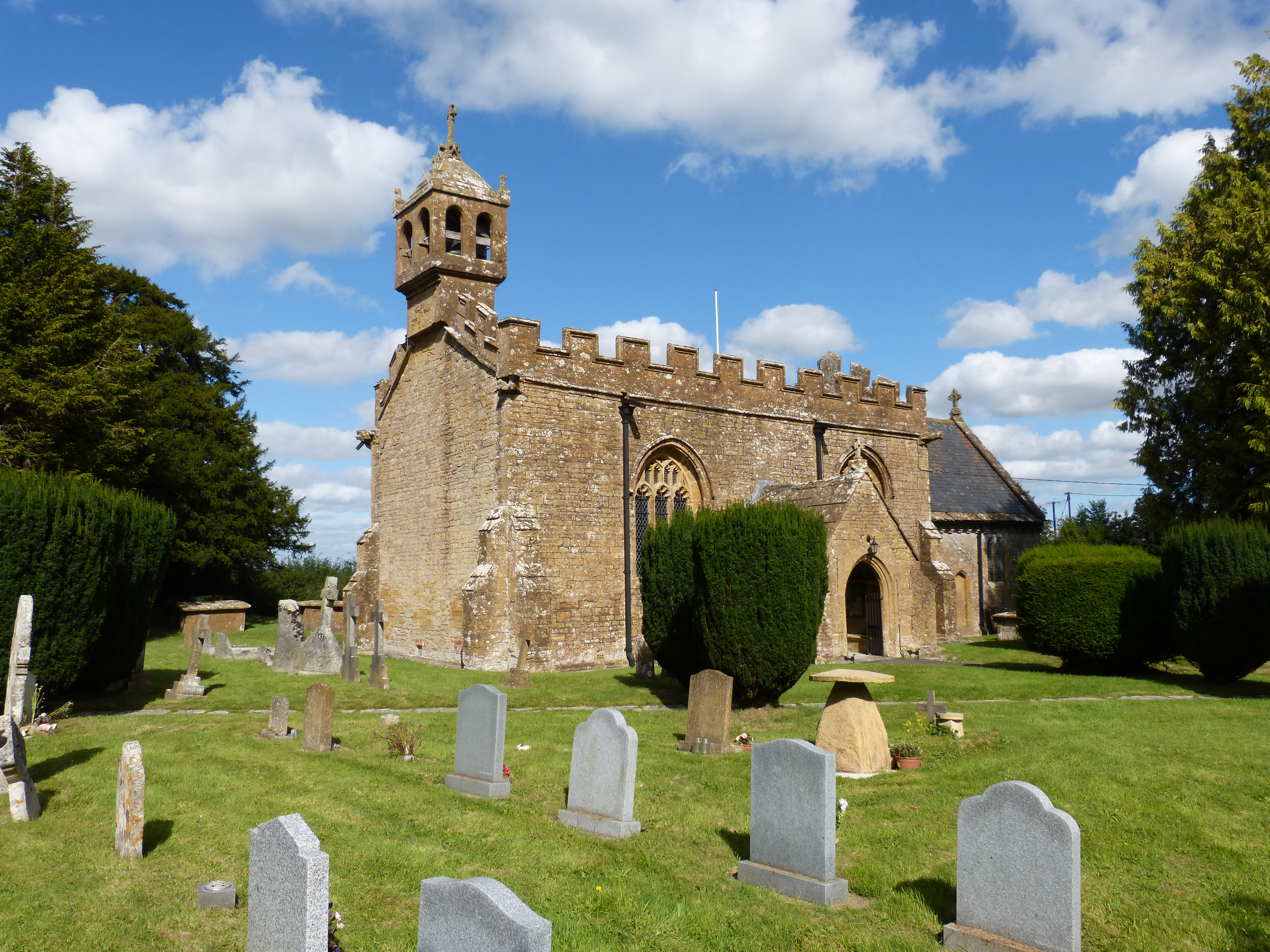
- Church of the Blessed Virgin Mary

- Location within Somerset
- Population: 574 (2011)
- OS grid reference: ST525195
- Unitary authority: Somerset Council
- Ceremonial county: Somerset
- Region: South West
- Country: England
- Sovereign state: United Kingdom
- Post town: YEOVIL
- Postcode district: BA22
- Dialling code: 01935
- Police: Avon and Somerset
- Fire: Devon and Somerset
- Ambulance: South Western
- UK Parliament: Glastonbury and Somerton

Chilthorne Domer is a village and parish in Somerset, England, situated 4 miles (6.4 km) north west of Yeovil. The village has a population of 574. It is situated on the old coach road from Ilchester to Yeovil.

== History ==
The village was known as Cilterne in the Domesday Book of 1086, which is a British hill name including the element celto meaning high. The second part of the name was after the Domer family, who held one of the manors. The other was held by the Vagg family and was known as Chiltorne Vagg. This survives in the name of Vagg farm southeast of the village.

The parish of Chilthorne Domer was part of the Stone Hundred.

The current manor house was built in the 17th century and has its own well. In the garden about 70 feet (21 m) south of the house is a six-seater privy built about 1720. It was used until 1939.

== Governance ==
The parish council has responsibility for local issues, including setting an annual precept (local rate) to cover the council's operating costs and producing annual accounts for public scrutiny. The parish council evaluates local planning applications and works with the local police, district council officers, and neighbourhood watch groups on matters of crime, security, and traffic. The parish council's role also includes initiating projects for the maintenance and repair of parish facilities, as well as consulting with the district council on the maintenance, repair, and improvement of highways, drainage, footpaths, public transport, and street cleaning. Conservation matters (including trees and listed buildings) and environmental issues are also the responsibility of the council.

For local government purposes, since 1 April 2023, the parish comes under the unitary authority of Somerset Council. Prior to this, it was part of the non-metropolitan district of South Somerset (established under the Local Government Act 1972). It was part of Yeovil Rural District before 1974.

It is also part of the Glastonbury and Somerton county constituency represented in the House of Commons of the Parliament of the United Kingdom. It elects one Member of Parliament (MP) by the first past the post system of election.

== Education ==
The village has a primary school for children between the ages of 4 and 11.

== Religious sites ==
The Anglican parish Church of St Mary has 13th-century origins and has been designated as a Grade II* listed building. It was granted to Bruton Priory in 1301.

== Notable residents ==
Susan Miller took the title Baroness Miller of Chilthorne Domer in 1998 after serving as a councillor at parish, district and county levels from 1987 to 2005, leading South Somerset District Council and as a member of Somerset County Council.

Stanley Adams, former pharmaceutical company executive at Hoffmann-La Roche and corporate whistleblower, lived in Chilthorne Domer from the late 1980s to 1993, when he was convicted of hiring a hit-man in a failed attempt to kill his second wife for insurance money.

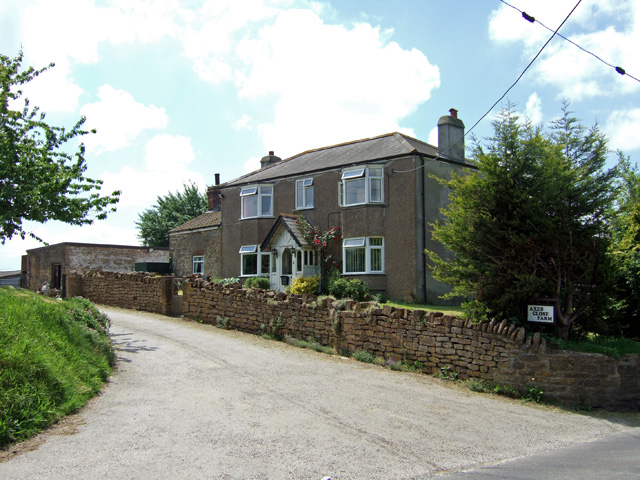
Axesclose Farmhouse

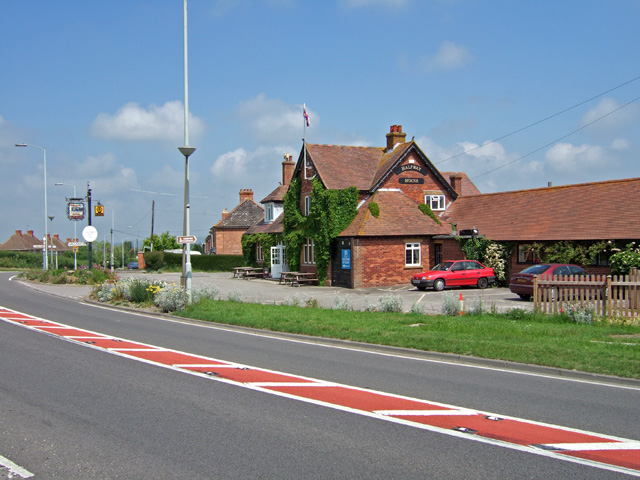
The Halfway House
