= Stoke Trister =

Village and civil parish in Somerset, England

Coordinates: 51.0552°N 2.3794°W

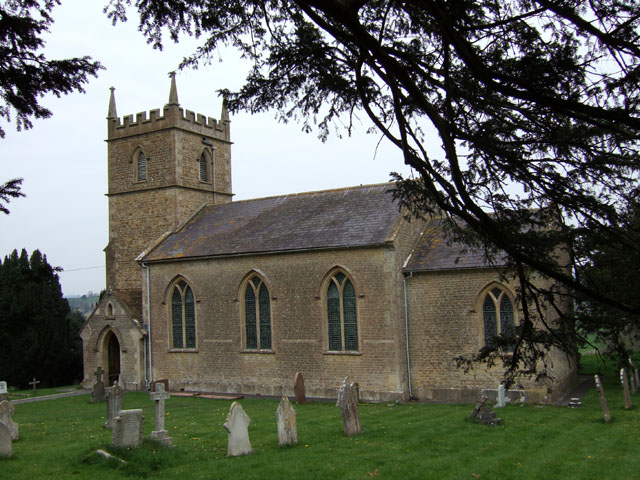
- Stoke Trister — Parish Church of St Andrew

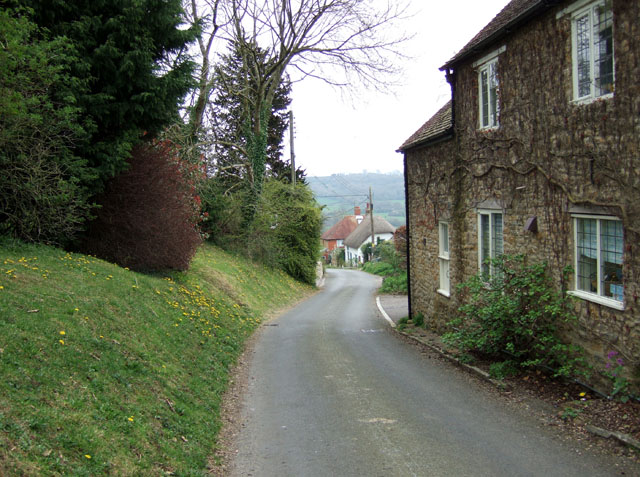
- Stoke Trister Village Street

- Location within Somerset
- Population: 313 (2011)
- OS grid reference: ST735285
- Unitary authority: Somerset Council
- Ceremonial county: Somerset
- Region: South West
- Country: England
- Sovereign state: United Kingdom
- Post town: WINCANTON
- Postcode district: BA9
- Dialling code: 01963
- Police: Avon and Somerset
- Fire: Devon and Somerset
- Ambulance: South Western
- UK Parliament: Glastonbury and Somerton

Stoke Trister is a village and civil parish 2 miles (3 km) south-east of Wincanton and 5 miles (8 km) north-west of Gillingham close to the Dorset border in the county of Somerset, England. The parish includes the hamlet of Bayford.

== History ==
The Stoke part of the name means place or dairy farm with the Trister part being a corruption of the name of Richard del Estre who was lord of the manor in the 12th century. Stoke Trister passed with Cucklington to the Phelips family in 1765 and was then held with Montacute.

The parish of Stoke Trister was part of the Norton Ferris Hundred.

The manor house, which was built in the 16th century, is now Stoke Farm House. It was acquired around 1547 by the Earl of Pembroke and sold in 1602.

Physicwell House, which was formerly known as Horwood Well House was built around 1805.

== Governance ==
The parish council has responsibility for local issues, including setting an annual precept (local rate) to cover the council’s operating costs and producing annual accounts for public scrutiny. The parish council evaluates local planning applications and works with the local police, district council officers, and neighbourhood watch groups on matters of crime, security, and traffic. The parish council's role also includes initiating projects for the maintenance and repair of parish facilities, as well as consulting with the district council on the maintenance, repair, and improvement of highways, drainage, footpaths, public transport, and street cleaning. Conservation matters (including trees and listed buildings) and environmental issues are also the responsibility of the council.

For local government purposes, since 1 April 2023, the parish comes under the unitary authority of Somerset Council. Prior to this, it was part of the non-metropolitan district of South Somerset (established under the Local Government Act 1972). It was part of Wincanton Rural District before 1974.

It is also part of the Glastonbury and Somerton county constituency represented in the House of Commons of the Parliament of the United Kingdom. It elects one Member of Parliament (MP) by the first past the post system of election.

== Religious sites ==
The Church of St Andrew dates from 1841 and has been designated by English Heritage as a Grade II listed building.
