= Peacemarsh =

Suburb of Gillingham, Dorset, England

Coordinates: 51.0434°N 2.2786°W

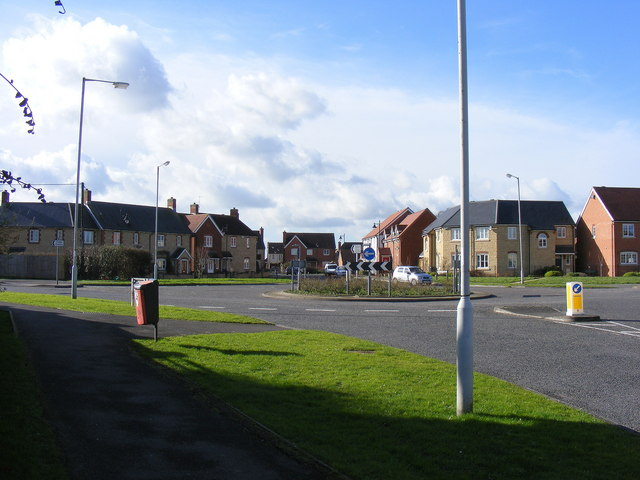
- Peacemarsh Roundabout

- Location within Dorset
- Population: less than 4,000
- OS grid reference: ST805271
- Unitary authority: Dorset
- Ceremonial county: Dorset
- Region: South West
- Country: England
- Sovereign state: United Kingdom
- Post town: Gillingham
- Postcode district: SP8
- Dialling code: 01747
- Police: Dorset
- Fire: Dorset and Wiltshire
- Ambulance: South Western
- UK Parliament: North Dorset

Peacemarsh is a section of the town of Gillingham in the north of the county of Dorset. It lies on the northern side of Gillingham, on the B3095 about 4 miles south of the A303. A neighbouring village is Milton on Stour. Other areas of Gillingham include Wyke and Bay.

Peacemarsh is in the census area of Gillingham which has a population of 9,323.

One of the local employers in Peacemarsh is Neal's Yard Remedies.
