= Church of St Lawrence, Cucklington =

Church in Somerset, England

Church of St Lawrence
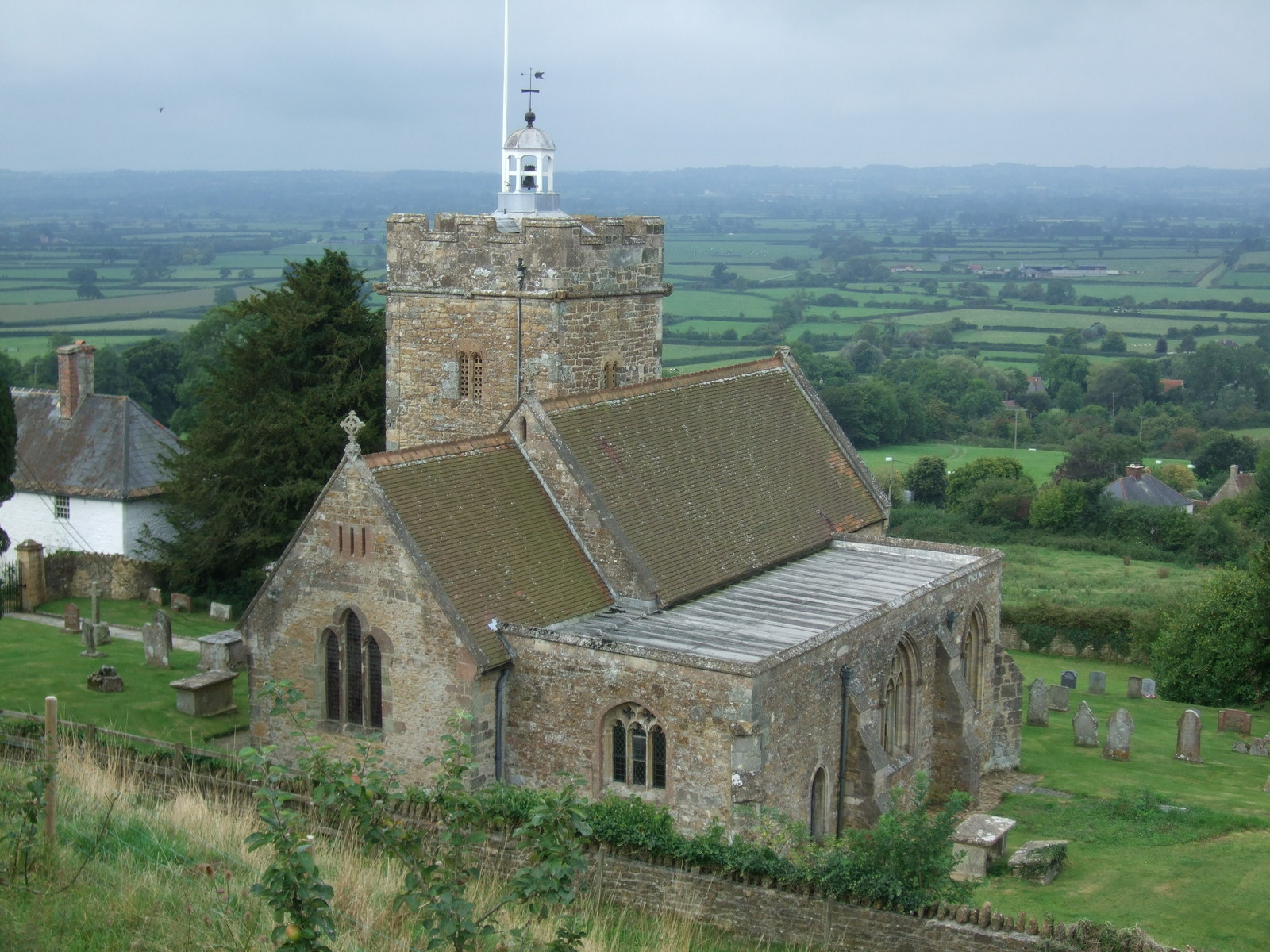

- Location within Somerset
- 51.0488°N 2.3506°W
- Location: Cucklington, Somerset, England

History
- Built: 13th century

Listed Building – Grade II*
- Official name: Church of St Lawrence
- Designated: 24 March 1961
- Reference no.: 1274765

The Anglican Church of St Lawrence in Cucklington, Somerset, England, was built in the 13th century. It is a Grade II* listed building.

== History ==
The church was built in the 13th century. It underwent Victorian restoration in the 19th century.

The parish is part of the benefice of Charlton Musgrove, Cucklington and Stoke Trister with Bayford, within the Diocese of Bath and Wells.

== Architecture ==
The stone building has clay-tiled roofs. It has a three-bay nave and two-bay chancel. The two-stage tower was rebuilt in 1705. It is supported by corner buttresses. The tower contains six bells, three of which were cast in 1726. The Cupola on the top of the tower, described by Pevsner as “pretty” was constructed in 1705.

In the churchyard is a cross which was erected as a memorial to the men of the village who died in World War I.

The interior fittings are mostly from the 19th century but there are remnants of stained glass from the 15th century. The font may be Norman.

== See also ==
- List of ecclesiastical parishes in the Diocese of Bath and Wells
