= Hampstead Heath with the Salt Box =

Painting by John Constable

- Artist: John Constable
- Year: c.1820
- Type: Oil on canvas, landscape painting
- Dimensions: 38.4 cm × 67 cm (15.1 in × 26 in)
- Location: Tate Britain, London

Hampstead Heath with the Salt Box is a c.1820 landscape painting by the British artist John Constable. It depicts a view of Hampstead Heath looking across Branch Hill towards Harrow and Highgate, with the spire of St Mary's Church, Harrow seen in the distance on the extreme left. It features a view of the house popularly known as the "Salt Box" due to its design. At the time Hampstead was a village on the rural outskirts of London. It was likely amongst the first Constable produced of the area after first moving there for his wife Maria's health. The viewpoint is from nearby Albion Cottage which they rented in 1819.

In his influential 1843 biography Memoirs of the Life of John Constable, Charles Robert Leslie devoted more attention to this painting than any other. The painting is now in the collection of the Tate Britain in Pimlico, having been donated by artist's daughter Isabel in 1888 as part of the Constable Bequest. An oil sketch in the Victoria and Albert Museum features the Salt Box from a closer distance.

== See also ==
- List of paintings by John Constable

== Bibliography ==
- Bailey, Anthony. John Constable: A Kingdom of his Own. Random House, 2012.
- Cove, Sarah. Constable: The Great Landscapes. Tate, 2006.
- Parris, Leslie. The Tate Gallery Constable Collection: A Catalogue. Tate Gallery Publications Department, 1981.
- Waites, Ian Common Land in English Painting, 1700–1850. Boydell Press, 2012.
