= Gillingham Bridge =

Painting by John Constable

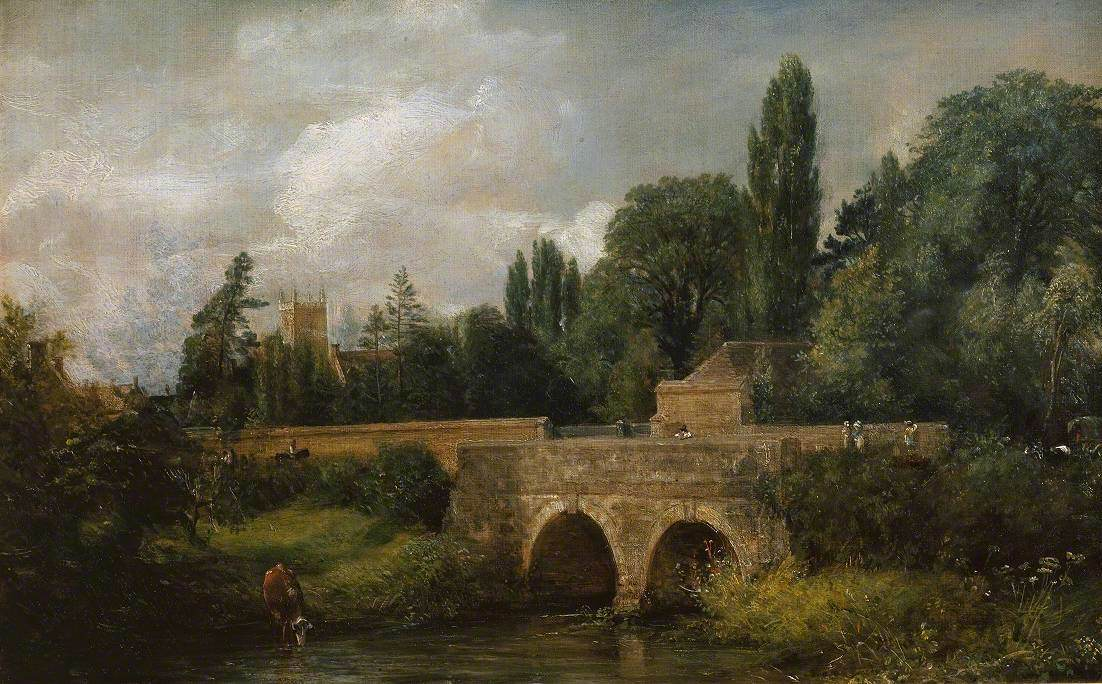
- Artist: John Constable
- Year: 1823
- Type: Oil on canvas, landscape painting
- Dimensions: 32.1 cm × 51.5 cm (12.6 in × 20.3 in)
- Location: Tate Britain, London

Gillingham Bridge is an 1823 landscape painting by the British artist John Constable. It portrays a scene of the country town of Gillingham in Dorset. It features the old bridge crossing the River Stour (not to be confused with the river of the same name in Constable's native Suffolk) by the town with church tower of St Mary the Virgin in the background. Constable's friend John Fisher held the incumbency of Gillingham and Constable visited him there in 1820. He returned again in 1823 when he painted this work.

Today the painting is in the collection of Tate Britain in Pimlico having been part of the Constable Bequestin 1888. Three years later Constable produced Parham Mill, another work inspired by his visit to Gillingham.

== Bibliography ==
- Bailey, Anthony. John Constable: A Kingdom of his Own. Random House, 2012.
- Beckett, R.B. John Constable and the Fishers: The Record of a Friendship. Taylor & Francis, 2023.
- Charles, Victoria. Constable. Parkstone International, 2015.
- Hamilton, James. Constable: A Portrait. Hachette UK, 2022.
- Parris, Leslie. The Tate Gallery Constable Collection: A Catalogue. Tate Gallery Publications Department, 1981.
- Reynolds, Graham. Constable's England. Metropolitan Museum of Art, 1983.
- Thornes, John E. John Constable's Skies: A Fusion of Art and Science. A&C Black, 1999.
