= Constable Bequest =

Collection of artwork by John Constable

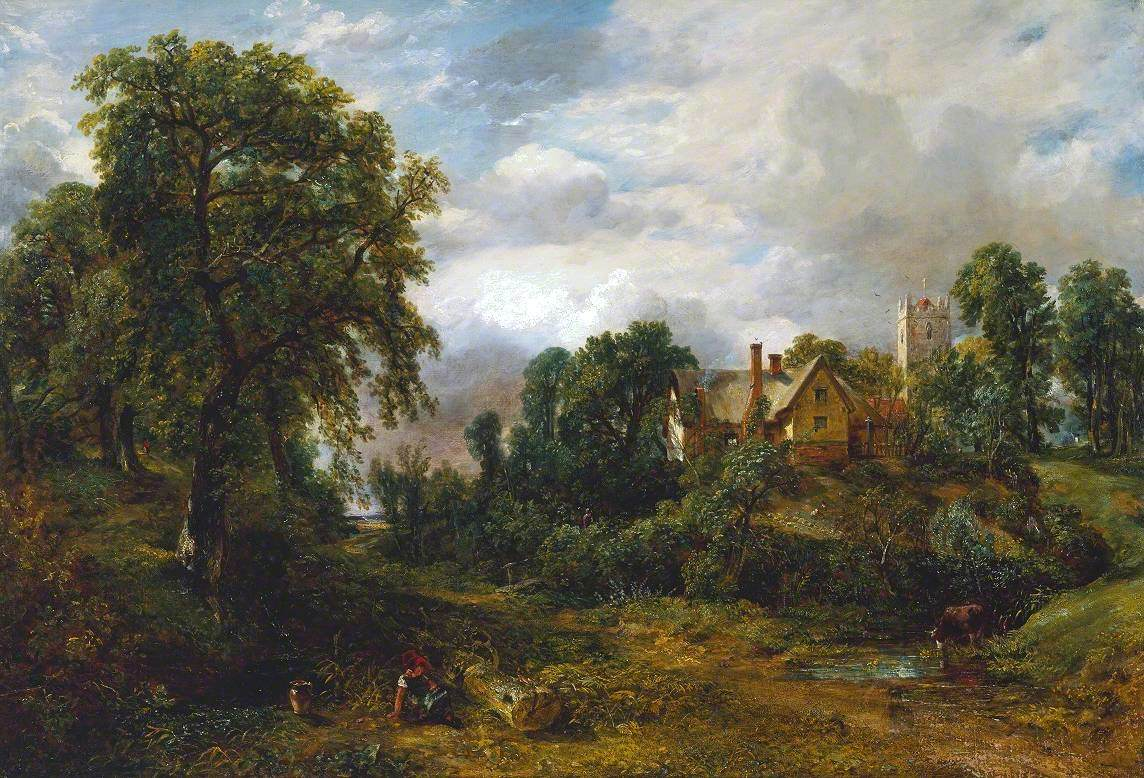
The Glebe Farm, 1830

The Constable Bequest was an 1888 bequest made to the British nation by Isabel Constable, the only surviving child of the Regency era artist John Constable. The bequest was made in the name of both Isobel and her late siblings including Lionel. It included oil paintings, watercolours, sketches and other materials from the career of Constable. It featured a number of paintings Constable had displayed at the Royal Academy of Arts.

The donation is today distributed amongst several major London galleries notably the Tate Britain, the National Gallery and the Victoria and Albert Museum. Many of the drawings went to the British Museum.

== Gallery ==
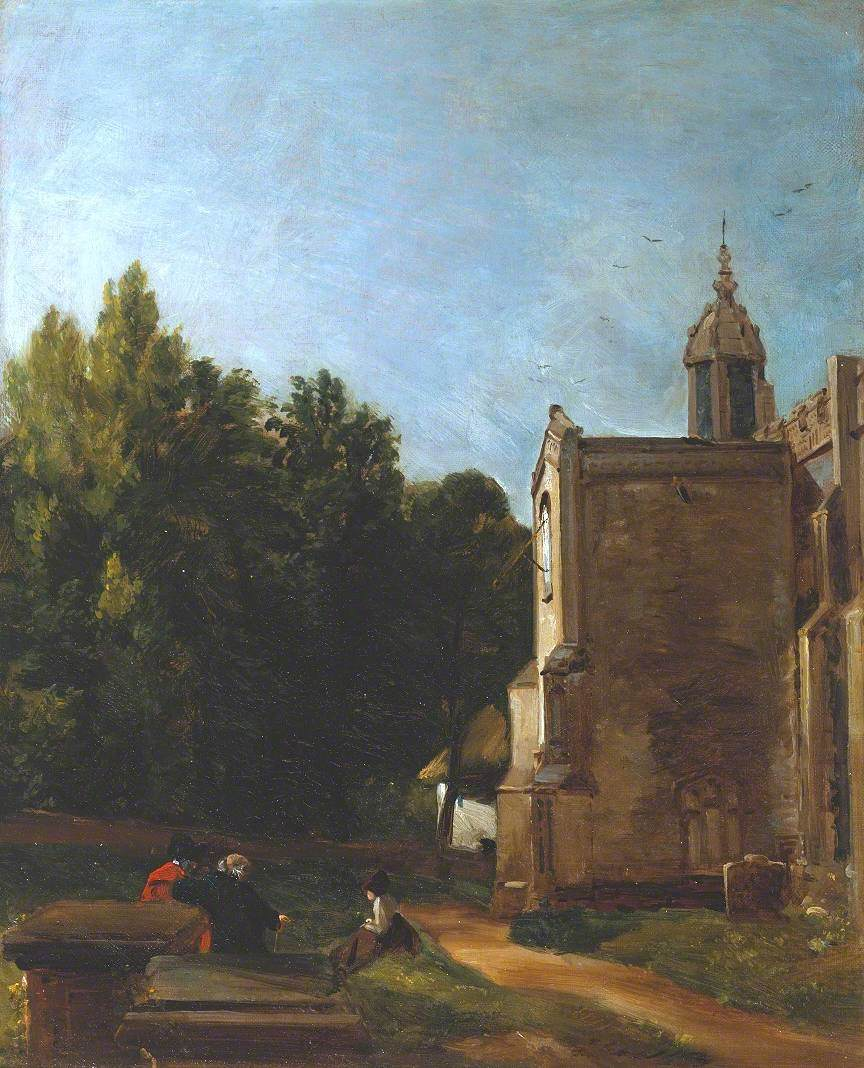
The Church Porch, East Bergholt, 1810

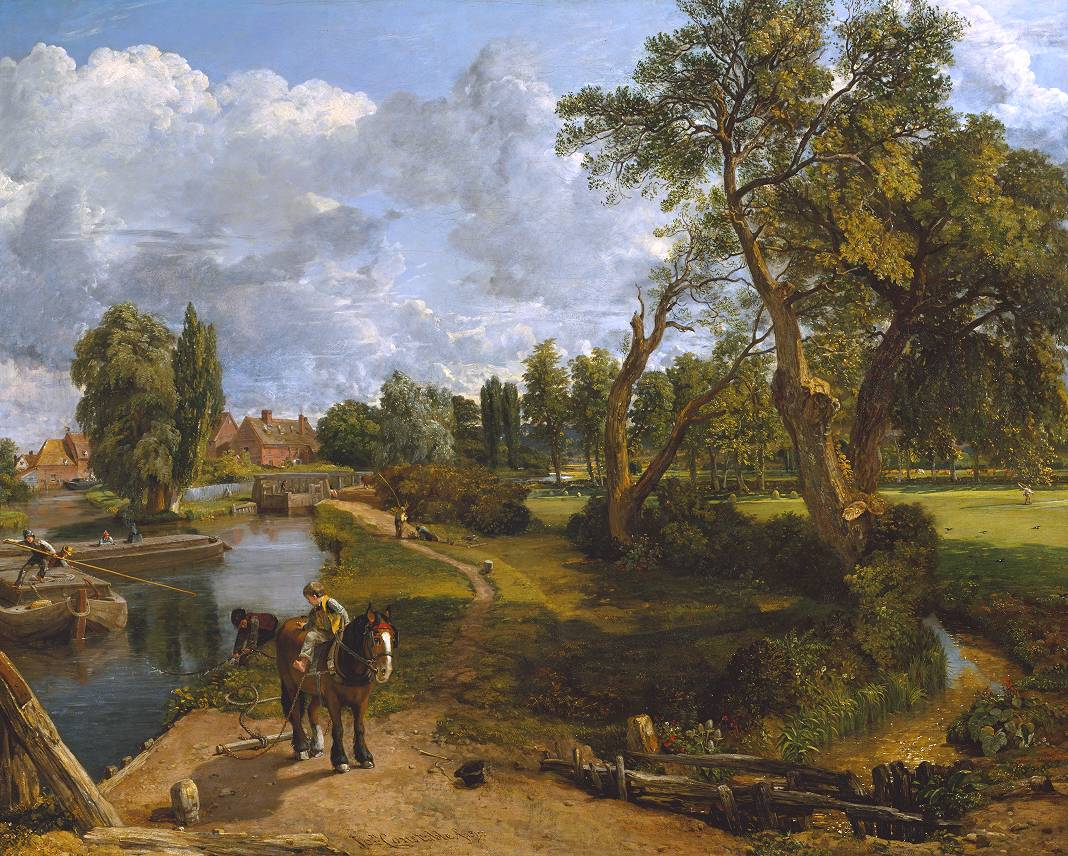
Flatford Mill, 1817

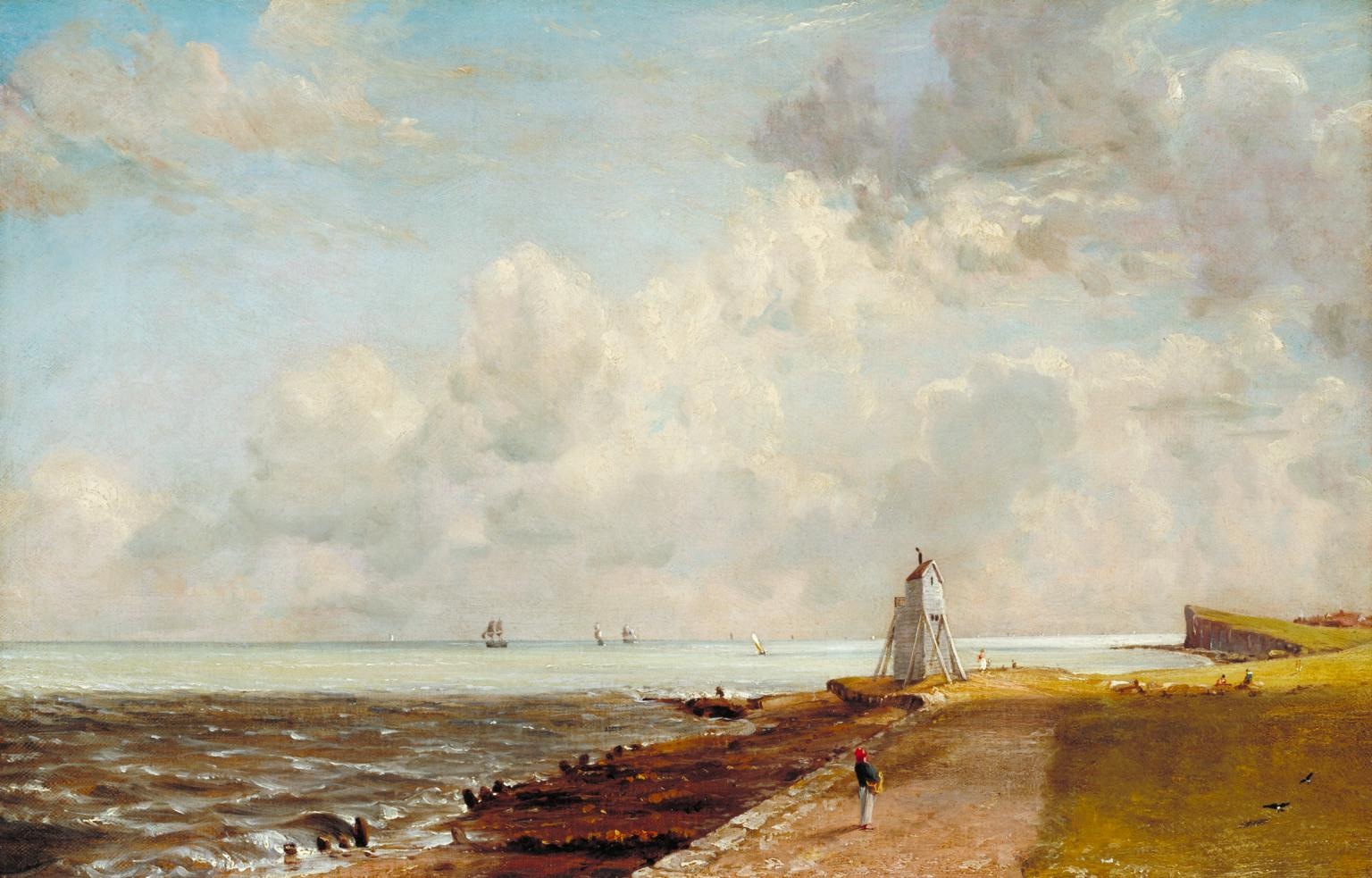
Harwich Lighthouse, 1820

Hampstead Heath with the Salt Box, 1820

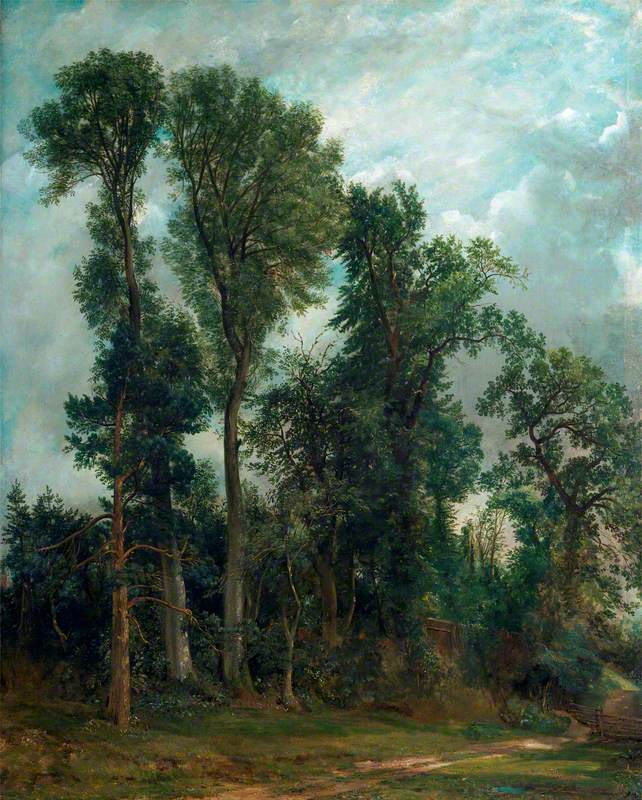
Trees at Hampstead, 1821

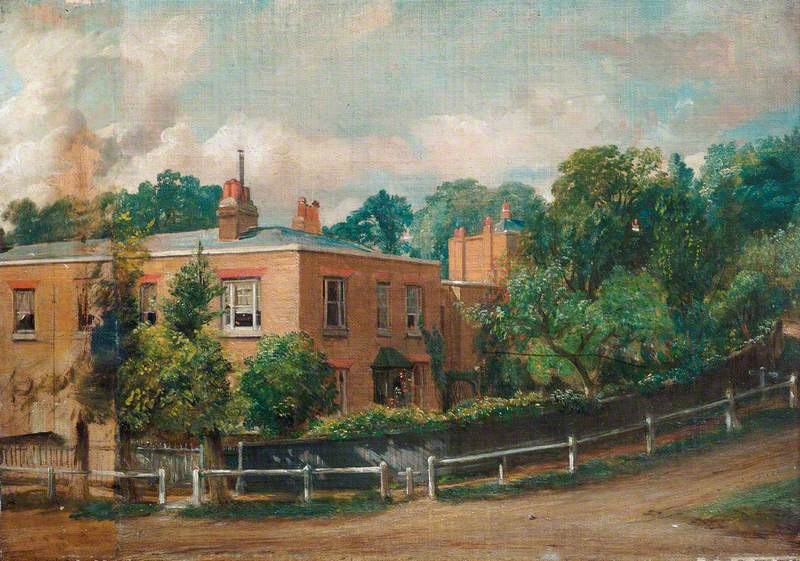
View of Lower Terrace, Hampstead, 1822

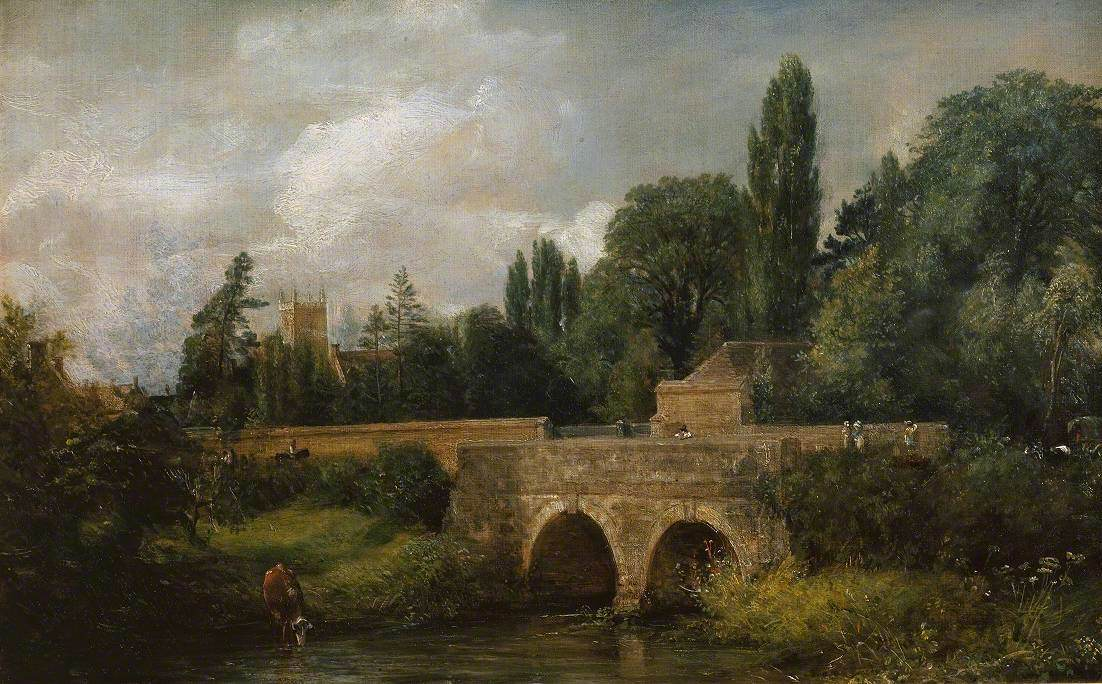
Gillingham Bridge, 1823

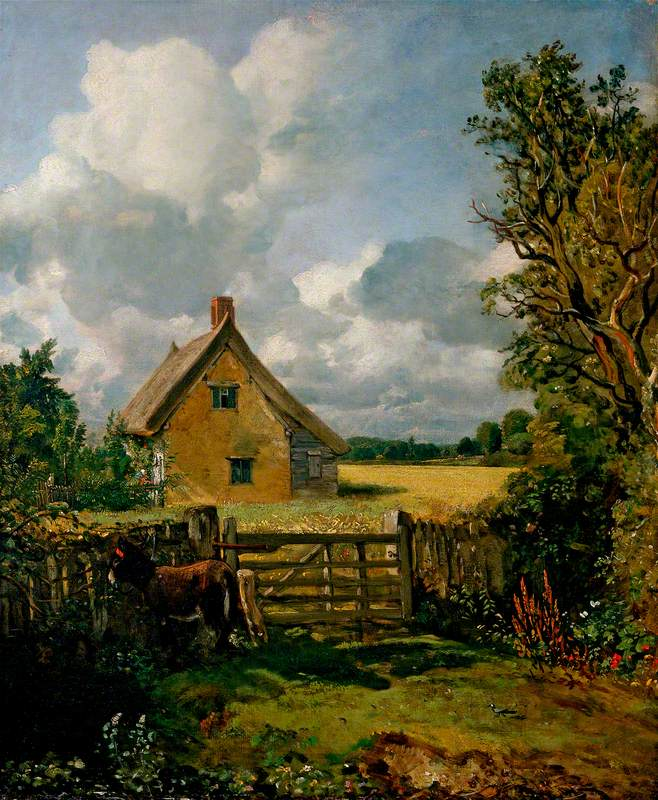
The Cottage in a Cornfield, 1833

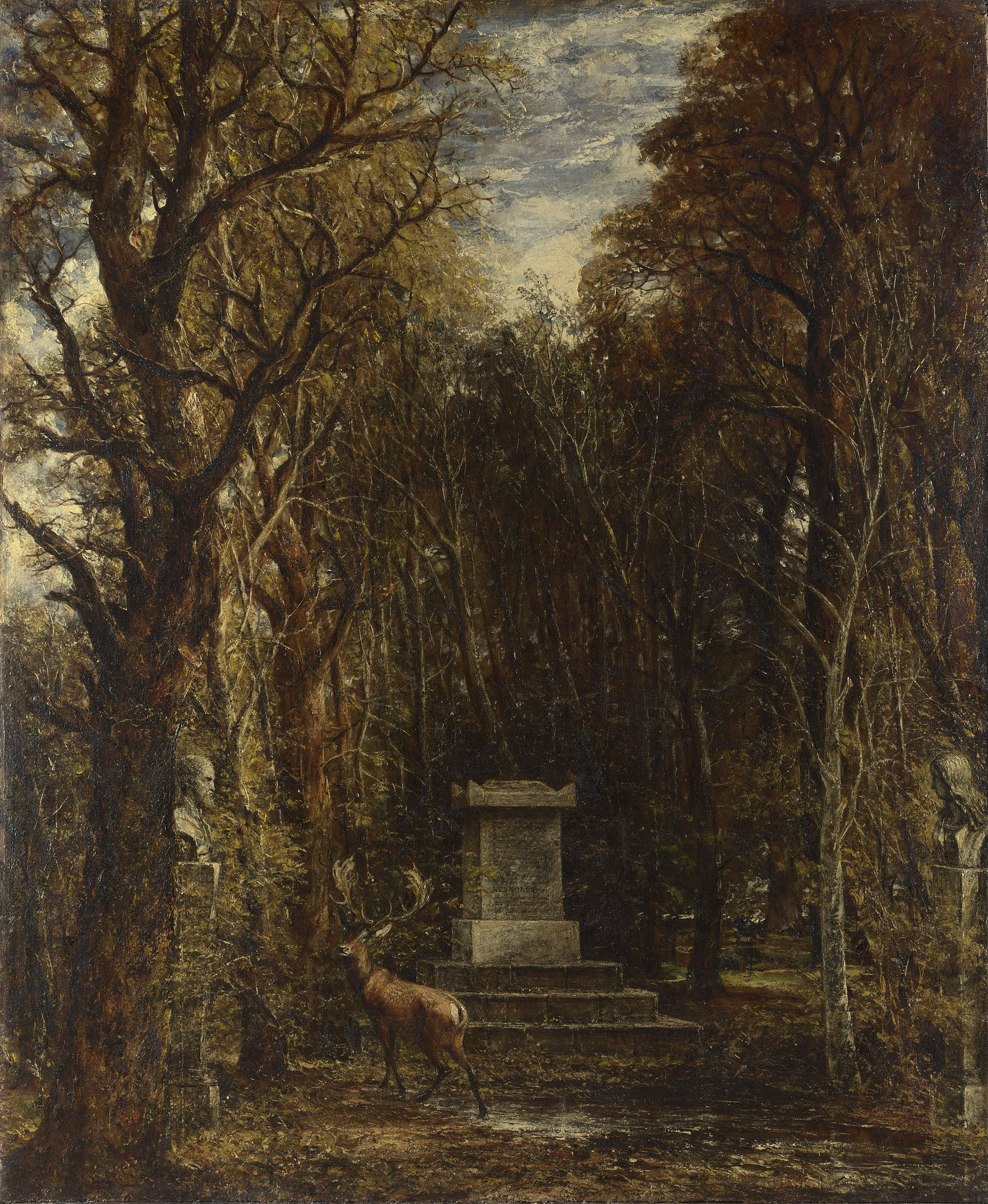
Cenotaph to the Memory of Sir Joshua Reynolds, 1836

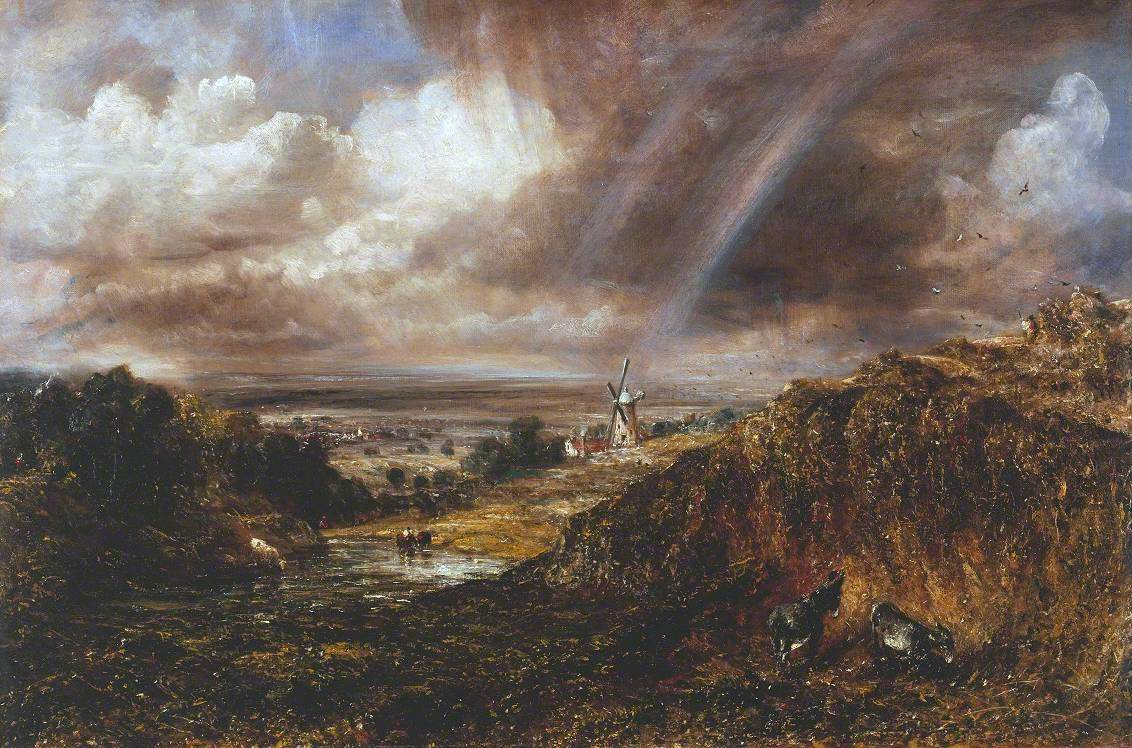
Hampstead Heath with a Rainbow, 1836

== See also ==
- Turner Bequest, an 1851 gift by Constable's colleague and rival J.M.W. Turner
