= Hampstead Heath with a Rainbow =

Painting by John Constable

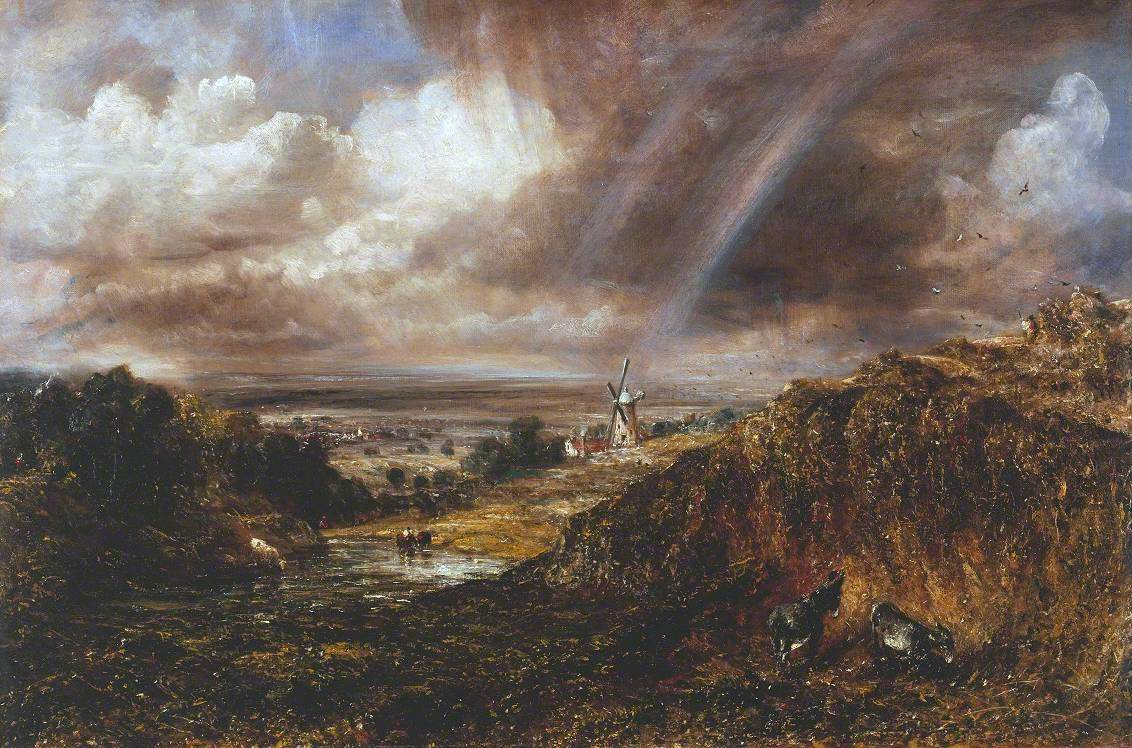
- Artist: John Constable
- Year: 1836
- Type: Oil on canvas, landscape painting
- Dimensions: 76.2 cm × 50.8 cm (30.0 in × 20.0 in)
- Location: Tate Britain; London

Hampstead Heath with a Rainbow is an 1836 landscape painting by the English artist John Constable. It depicts a scene from Branch Hill in Hampstead overlooking Hampstead Heath.

While Constable had previously painted several similar views this work, painted near the end of his career, is notable for the addition of a windmill and a rainbow. He was pleased with the result "one of my best bits of Heath" and what he described as the "fresh" and "sunshiney" effect.

Today it is in the collection of the Tate Britain having been bequeathed by his daughter Isabel in 1888 as part of the Constable Bequest.

== See also ==
- Salisbury Cathedral from the Meadows, an 1831 painting by Constable also featuring a rainbow
- List of paintings by John Constable

== Bibliography ==
- Bailey, Anthony. John Constable: A Kingdom of his Own. Random House, 2012.
- Bishop, Peter. An Archetypal Constable: National Identity and the Geography of Nostalgia. Fairleigh Dickinson University Press, 1995.
- Parris, Leslie. The Tate Gallery Constable Collection: A Catalogue. Tate Gallery Publications Department, 1981.
