= Norton Ferris Hundred =

Historical Hundred of Somerset, England

- Area
- 18,730 acres (7,580 ha)
- Status: Hundred
- Subdivisions
  - Type: Parishes
  - Units: Bratton Seymour, Charlton Musgrove, Cucklington, Kilmington, Penselwood, Shepton Montague, Stoke Trister, Wincanton, and parts of Maiden Bradley and Stourton

The Hundred of Norton Ferris is one of the 40 historical Hundreds in the historic county of Somerset, England, dating from before the Norman conquest during the Anglo-Saxon era, although exact dates are unknown.

== History ==
Each hundred had a 'fyrd', which acted as the local defence force and a court which was responsible for the maintenance of the frankpledge system. They also formed a unit for the collection of taxes. The role of the hundred court was described in the Dooms (laws) of King Edgar. The name of the hundred was normally that of its meeting-place.

In 1084 at the time of a geld inquest the area now covered by this Hundred was part of Bruton Hundred. Later it was named for Wincanton and then during the 12th century took the name of Norton manor in Kilmington, which became part of Wiltshire in 1896. Part of the name of the Selwood Forest was added to make Norton Selwood. In the 16th century it was called Norton Ferrers or Ferris and Norton Stourton in 1557.

The Hundred of Norton Ferris consisted of the ancient parishes of: Bratton Seymour, Charlton Musgrove, Cucklington, Kilmington, Penselwood, Shepton Montague, Stoke Trister, Wincanton, and parts of Maiden Bradley and Stourton. It covered an area of 18,730 acres (7,580 ha).

The importance of the hundred courts declined from the seventeenth century. By the 19th century several different single-purpose subdivisions of counties, such as poor law unions, sanitary districts, and highway districts sprang up, filling the administrative role previously played by parishes and hundreds. Although the Hundreds have never been formally abolished, their functions ended with the establishment of county courts in 1867 and the introduction of districts by the Local Government Act 1894.
