= Cucklington =

Village and civil parish in Somerset, England

Coordinates: 51.0463°N 2.3508°W

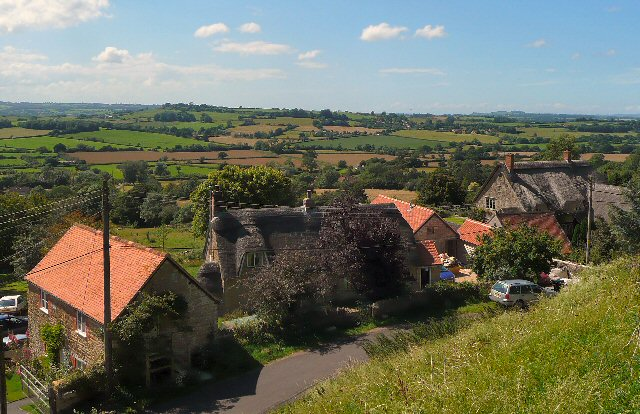
- Cucklington

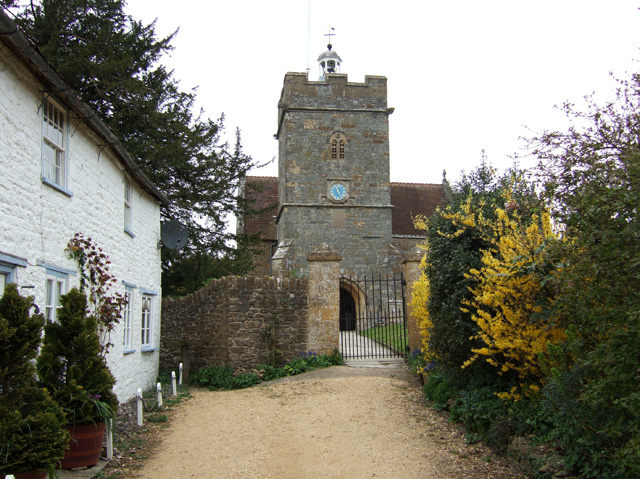
- Church of St Lawrence

- Location within Somerset
- Population: 173 (2011)
- OS grid reference: ST755275
- Unitary authority: Somerset Council
- Ceremonial county: Somerset
- Region: South West
- Country: England
- Sovereign state: United Kingdom
- Post town: WINCANTON
- Postcode district: BA9
- Dialling code: 01963
- Police: Avon and Somerset
- Fire: Devon and Somerset
- Ambulance: South Western
- UK Parliament: Glastonbury and Somerton

Cucklington is a village and parish in Somerset, England, situated on a hill 3 miles (4.8 km) south east of Wincanton and 4 miles (6.4 km) north west of Gillingham, near the Dorset border. The village has a population of 173.

The nearest railway station is in neighbouring Gillingham, Dorset. Trains run on the Exeter to Waterloo line.

== History ==
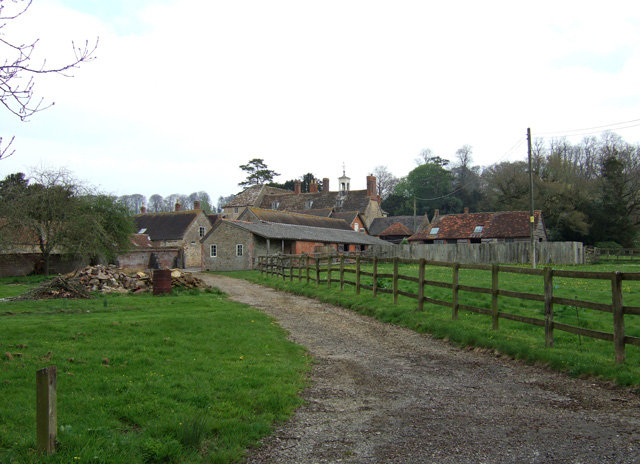
Shanks House.

The name Cucklington comes from Old English meaning the settlement of Cucola's people.

The parish of Cucklington was part of the Norton Ferris Hundred.

Shanks House has medieval fragments, but had major works in the 17th and 18th centuries, including refitting by Nathaniel Ireson. It has been designated as a Grade I listed building.

== Governance ==
The parish council has responsibility for local issues, including setting an annual precept (local rate) to cover the council's operating costs.

For local government purposes, since 1 April 2023, the parish comes under the unitary authority of Somerset Council. Prior to this, it was part of the non-metropolitan district of South Somerset (established under the Local Government Act 1972). It was part of Wincanton Rural District before 1974.

It is also part of the Glastonbury and Somerton county constituency represented in the House of Commons of the Parliament of the United Kingdom. It elects one Member of Parliament (MP) by the first past the post system of election.

== Religious sites ==
The parish church of St Lawrence dates from the 13th century.
