= Flatford Mill (painting) =

Painting by John Constable

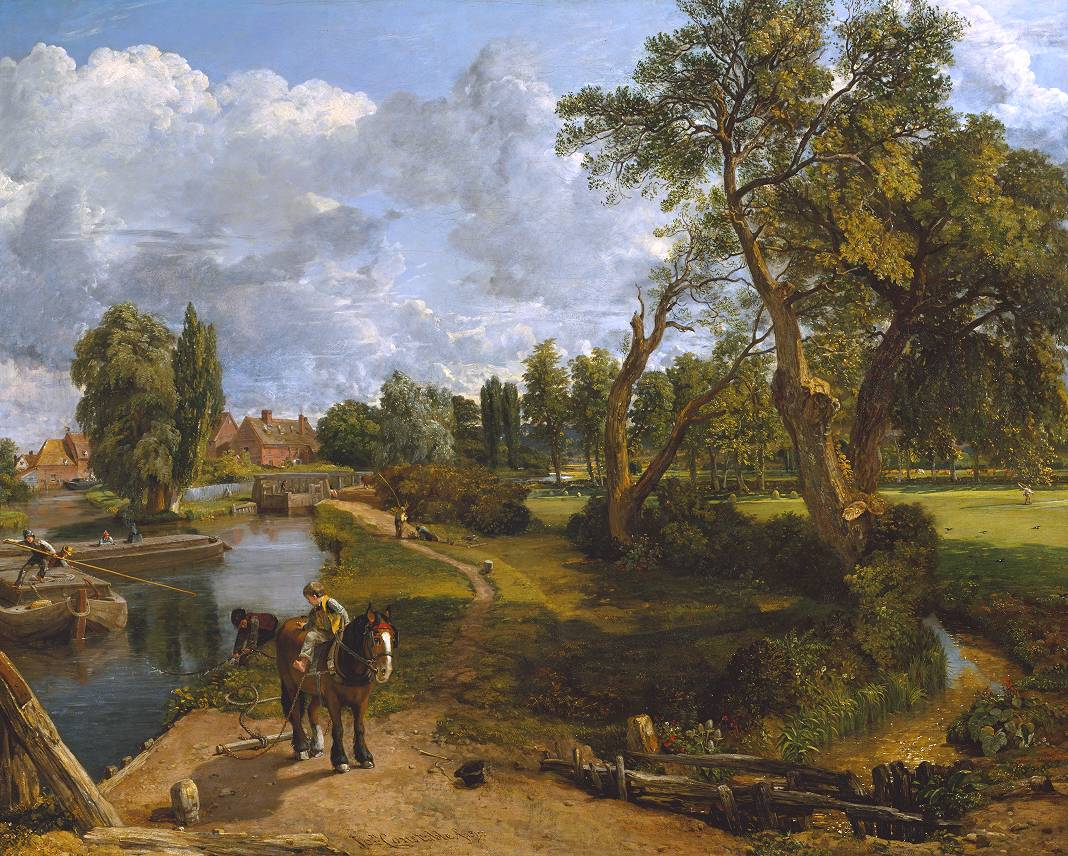
- Artist: John Constable
- Year: 1816–17
- Type: Oil on canvas, landscape painting
- Dimensions: 100 cm × 130 cm (40 in × 50 in)
- Location: Tate Britain, London

Flatford Mill is an 1817 landscape painting by the British artist John Constable. It depicts a view of Flatford Mill in East Bergholt on the River Stour. It is also known by the subtitle Scene on a Navigable River.

Although based in London, Constable frequently painted scenes from the area around the village in his native Suffolk. His later landscape painting The Hay Wain, perhaps Constable's best-known work, was also set by Flatford Mill. Along with his contemporary Turner, Constable was the leading landscape painter of the Regency era. His frequent depictions of the area where he grew up in rural Suffolk led to it being known as Constable Country.

It was displayed at the Royal Academy's Summer Exhibition at Somerset House in 1817. It is considered a forerunner of his later "six footers". The work was part of the Constable Bequest of 1888 and is now in the collection of the Tate Britain and is in display adjacent to the rooms featuring the paintings of the Turner Bequest.

== See also ==
- List of paintings by John Constable

== Bibliography ==
- Bailey, Anthony. John Constable: A Kingdom of his Own. Random House, 2012.
- Bermingham, Ann. Landscape and Ideology: The English Rustic Tradition, 1740-1860. University of California Press, 1986.
- Charles, Victoria. Constable. Parkstone International, 2015.
- Hamilton, James. Constable: A Portrait. Hachette UK, 2022.
- Venning, Barry. Constable. Parkstone International, 2015.
- Waites, Ian. Common Land in English Painting, 1700-1850. Boydell Press, 2012.
