= The Cottage in a Cornfield =

Painting by John Constable

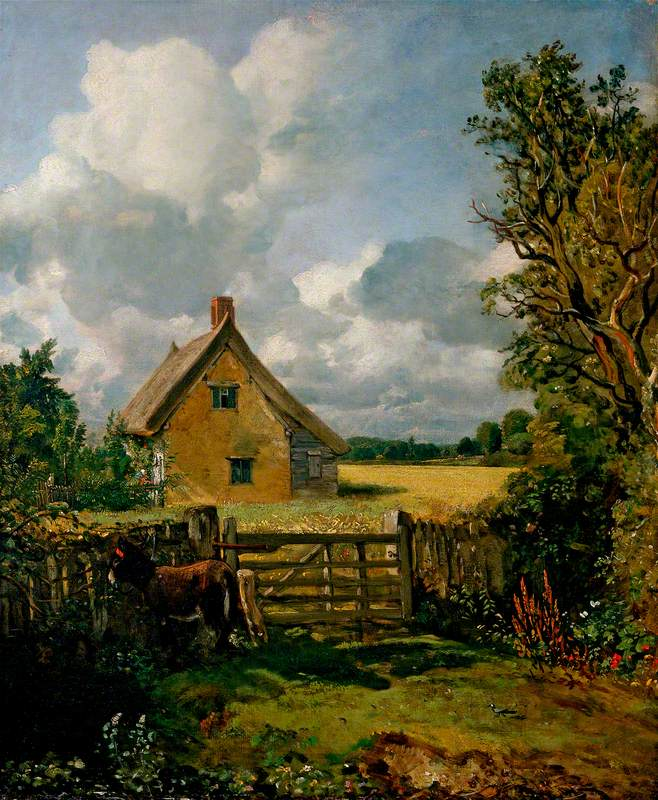
- Artist: John Constable
- Year: c. 1833
- Type: Oil on canvas, landscape painting
- Dimensions: 62 cm × 51.5 cm (24 in × 20.3 in)
- Location: Victoria and Albert Museum; London

The Cottage in a Cornfield is an 1833 landscape painting by the British artist John Constable. It depicts a cottage in a cornfield located near East Bergholt in his native Suffolk. The donkey was based on a study Constable had produced in 1815 but the completed picture wasn't finished until March 1833. The painting was one of four works Constable displayed at the Royal Academy Exhibition of 1833 at Somerset House. Today it is in the collection of the Victoria and Albert Museum in London, having been presented by the artist's daughter Isabel as part of the Constable Bequest in 1888.

It is similar to an earlier painting known as A Cottage in a Cornfield which Constable displayed at the Royal Academy and British Institution in 1817–1818 and is now in the National Museum Cardiff.

== See also ==
- List of paintings by John Constable

== Bibliography ==
- Hamilton, James. Constable: A Portrait. Hachette UK, 2022.
- Roe, Sonia. Oil Paintings in Public Ownership in the Victoria and Albert Museum. Public Catalogue Foundation, 2008.
