= Lionel Constable =

British artist

Lionel Bicknell Constable (1828–1887) was an English painter. The son of the noted Romantic painter John Constable and his wife Maria Bicknell, he was born in Hampstead which was then on the outskirts of London.

Like his father he concentrated on producing landscapes of the English countryside. These have sometimes been confused with his father's pictures. Near Stoke-by-Nayland in the Tate Britain was wrongly attributed to his father until 1978.

Lionel Constable displayed paintings at the Annual Exhibitions of the Royal Academy of Arts, doing so for the last time in 1855.

The following year when his sister Isabel Constable died the remaining family collection of the artworks and documents of their father were presented to the nation as part of the Constable Bequest, much of which is now in the collection of the Victoria and Albert Museum.

== Gallery ==
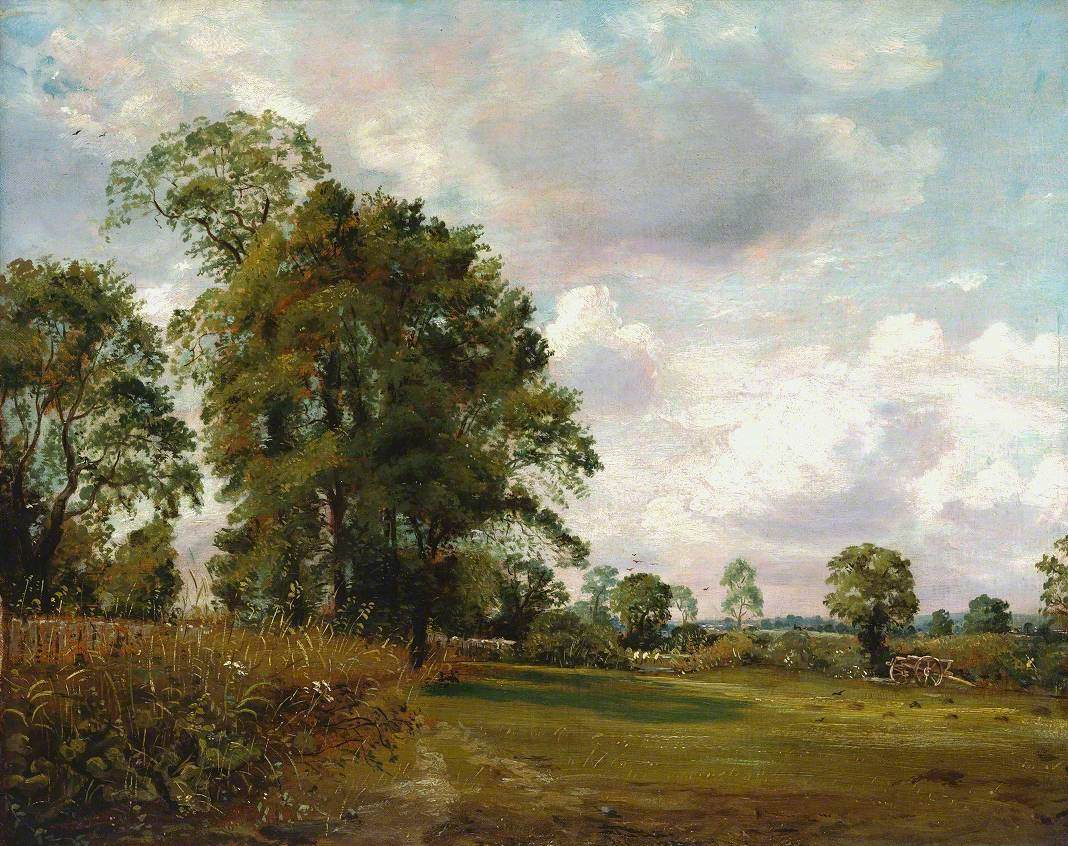
Near Stoke-by-Nayland, c.1850

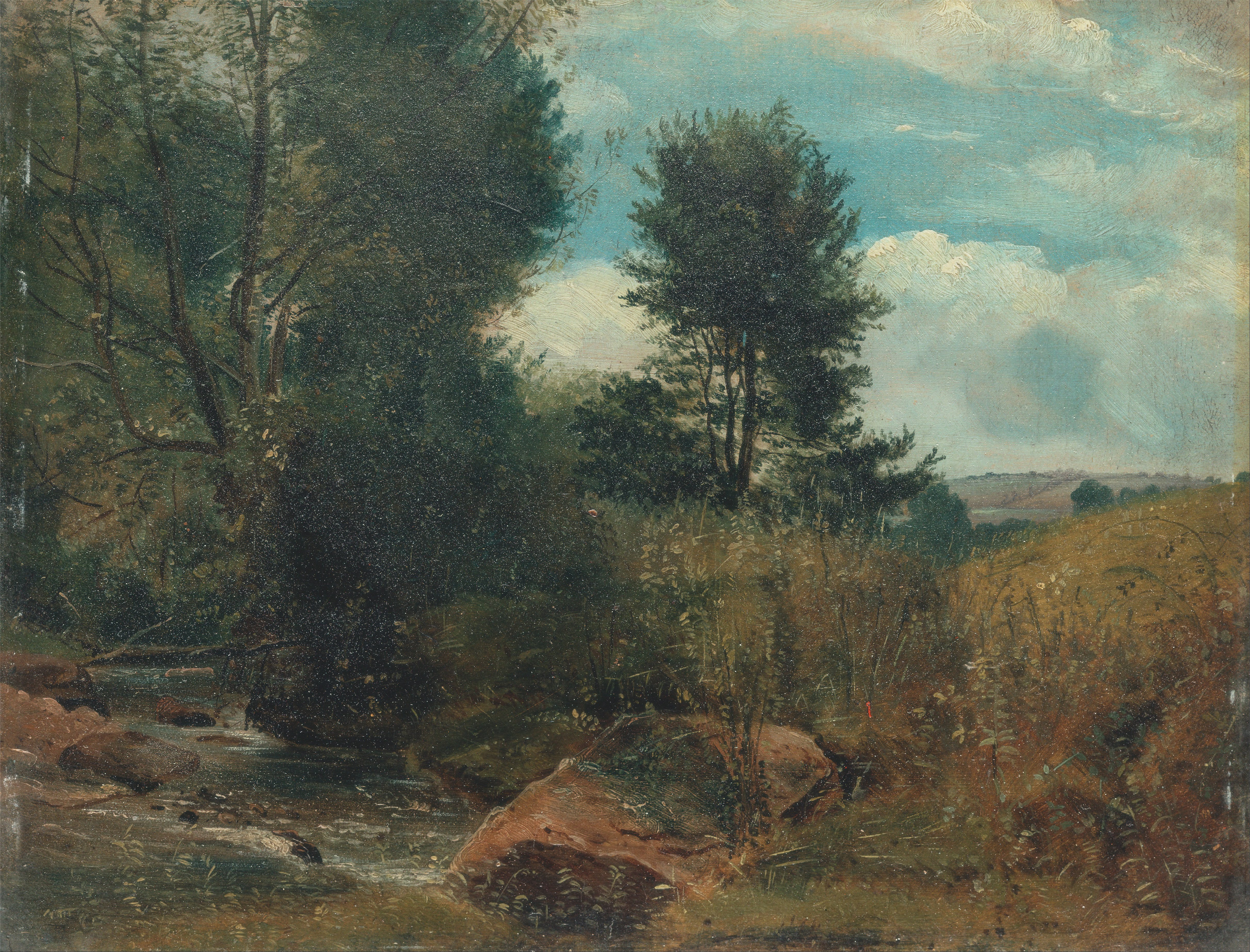
View on the River Sid, near Sidmouth, c.1852

== Bibliography ==
- Bailey, Anthony. John Constable: A Kingdom of his Own. Random House, 2012.
- Fleming-Williams, Ian & Parris, Leslie. The Discovery of Constable. Hamish Hamilton, 1984.
- Radford, Ron. Island to Empire: 300 Years of British Art, 1550-1850. Art Gallery of South Australia, 2005.
