= Church of St Nicholas, Bratton Seymour =

Church in Somerset, England

Church of St Nicholas
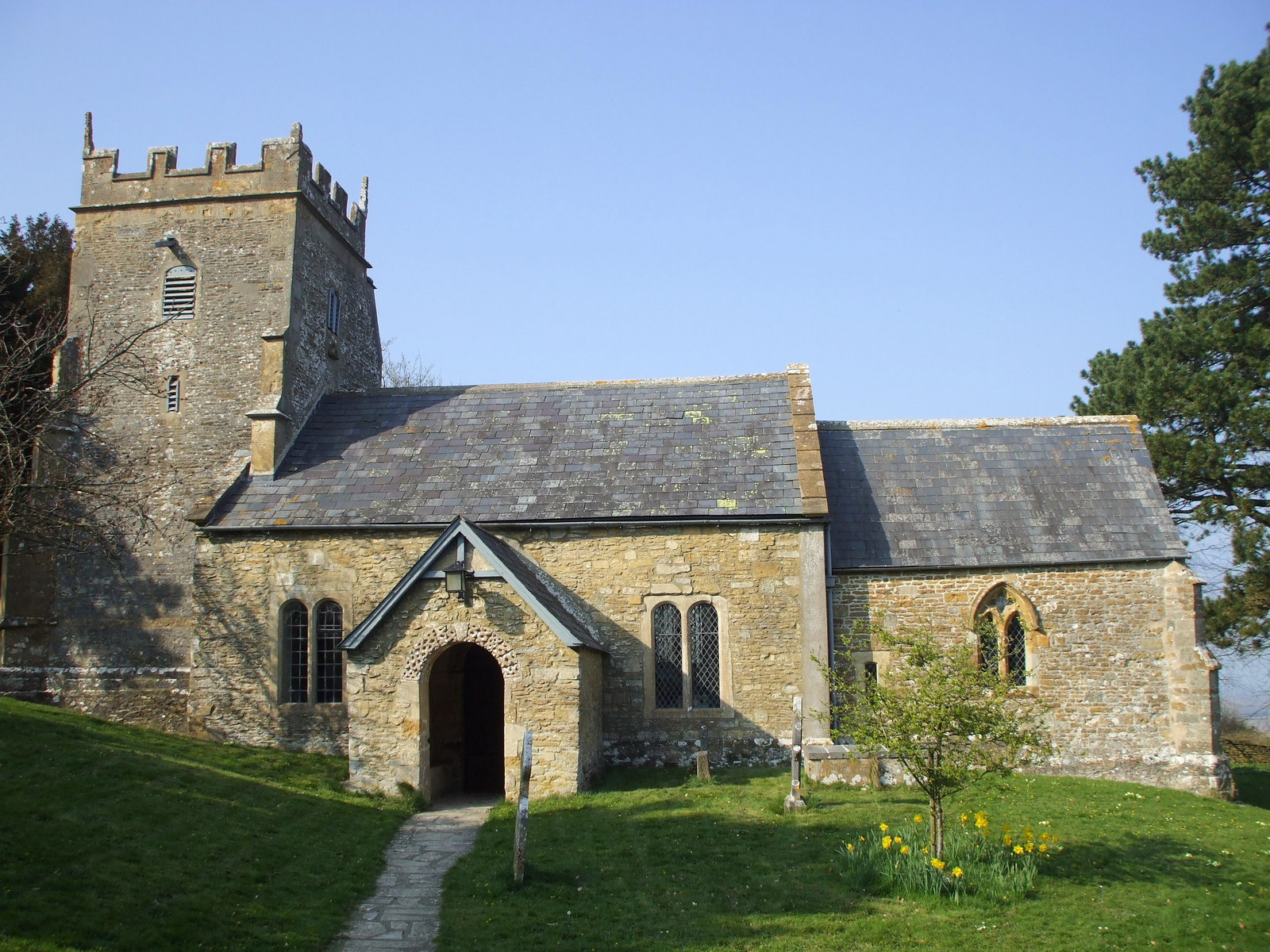

- Location within Somerset
- 51.0691°N 2.4622°W
- Location: Bratton Seymour, Somerset, England

History
- Built: 13th century

Listed Building – Grade II*
- Official name: Church of St Nicholas
- Designated: 24 March 1961
- Reference no.: 1177220

The Anglican Church of St Nicholas in Bratton Seymour, Somerset, England, was built in the 13th century. It is a Grade II* listed building.

== History ==
The church was built in the 13th century. It was originally dedicated to St. Giles, and has also been known as Holy Trinity Church.

Due to the condition of some of the stonework and ceilings the building has been laced o the Heritage at Risk Register.

The parish is part of the Camelot Parishes benefice within the Diocese of Bath and Wells.

== Architecture ==
The stone building has Doulting and hamstone dressings and slate roofs. It consists of a three-bay nave and two-bay chancel with a small vestry and south porch. The nave walls incorporate remnants of 12th-century carvings. The west tower is supported by angled buttresses and contains bells from the 14th and 15th centuries.

The interior fittings are mostly from the 19th century, but it does contain a circular Norman font.

== See also ==
- List of ecclesiastical parishes in the Diocese of Bath and Wells
