= Trees at Hampstead =

Painting by John Constable

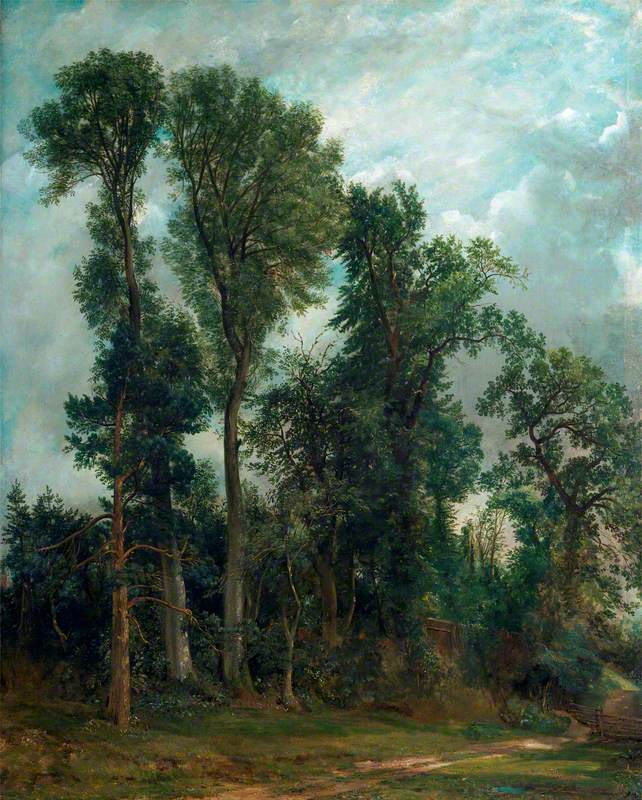
- Artist: John Constable
- Year: 1821
- Type: Oil on canvas, landscape painting
- Dimensions: 91.4 cm × 72.4 cm (36.0 in × 28.5 in)
- Location: Victoria and Albert Museum, London

Trees at Hampstead: The Path to Church is an 1821 landscape painting by the British artist John Constable. It depicts a view in Hampstead where Constable lived from 1819. The distant spire of the church of St John-at-Hampstead can be seen in the bottom left hand corner. The painting was displayed at the Royal Academy Exhibition of 1822 at Somerset House. It is today in the collection of the Victoria and Albert Museum in London, having been bequeathed by the artist's daughter Isabel as part of the Constable Bequest in 1888.

== See also ==
- List of paintings by John Constable

== Bibliography ==
- Hamilton, James. Constable: A Portrait. Hachette UK, 2022.
- Morris, Edward. Constable's Clouds: Paintings and Cloud Studies by John Constable. National Galleries of Scotland, 2000.
- Roe, Sonia. Oil Paintings in Public Ownership in the Victoria and Albert Museum. Public Catalogue Foundation, 2008.
- Wordsworth, Jonathan, Jaye, Michael C. & Woof, Robert. Oil Paintings in Public Ownership in the Victoria and Albert Museum. Public Catalogue Foundation, 2008.
