= St Mary the Virgin, Gillingham, Dorset =

Church in Dorset, England

Coordinates: 51°02′17″N 2°16′39″W

St. Mary the Virgin
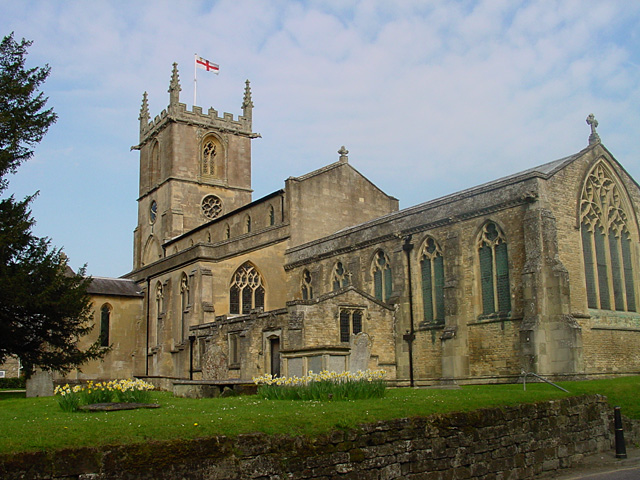
- St. Mary the Virgin
- Denomination: Church of England
- Churchmanship: Liberal Catholic
- Website: www.achurchnearyou.com/church/6802/

History
- Dedication: Blessed Virgin Mary

Architecture
- Heritage designation: Grade I listed
- Designated: 16 August 1960

Administration
- Province: Canterbury
- Diocese: Salisbury
- Archdeaconry: Dorset
- Deanery: Blackmore Vale
- Parish: Gillingham, Dorset

Clergy
- Rector: Vacant

St Mary's Church is the parish church for the town of Gillingham in the Blackmore Vale in the north of Dorset. The church is in the Diocese of Salisbury in the Church of England, and part of the Anglican Communion.

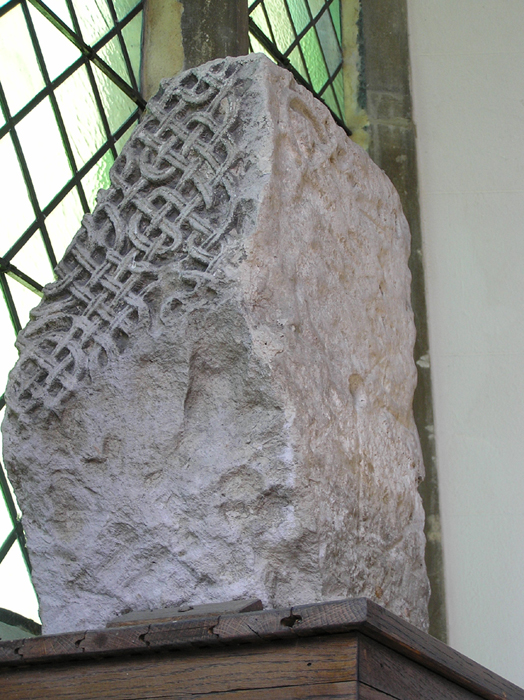
Anglo Saxon stone

There is believed to have been a Christian presence in the area since Anglo-Saxon days, evidence being a stone with a complicated interlaced pattern, now in the museum, which is believed to be the remains of a 9th-century cross – either a preaching cross or a grave marker. But most of the current building, particularly the nave, dates from an early Victorian rebuild. The chancel (choir and sanctuary) however, is older; the five great pointed windows with their trefoil heads, which stand on the south side of the chancel, show that it was built in the Decorated Gothic style popular in the 14th century. On the north wall of the chancel, only two feet above the floor, can be seen the archway of an Easter Sepulchre.

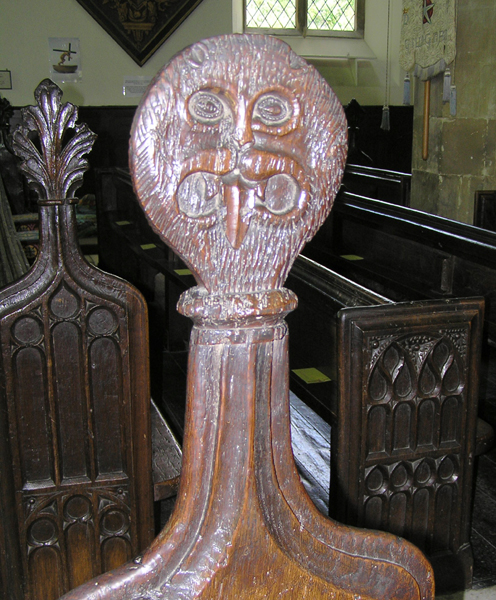
Bench ends include the grotesque

Some bench ends, a screen at the east end of the north aisle, and the font, are in the Perpendicular Gothic style of the 15th and 16th centuries.

The Chapel of the Good Shepherd was given by Mr and Mrs Carlton Cross in memory of their son who was killed in France during the First World War while carrying in some of the wounded men from his regiment. W. D. Caroe, the architect who designed the chapel, went on to create many other fine works, including the east end of the Lady Chapel in Sherborne Abbey.

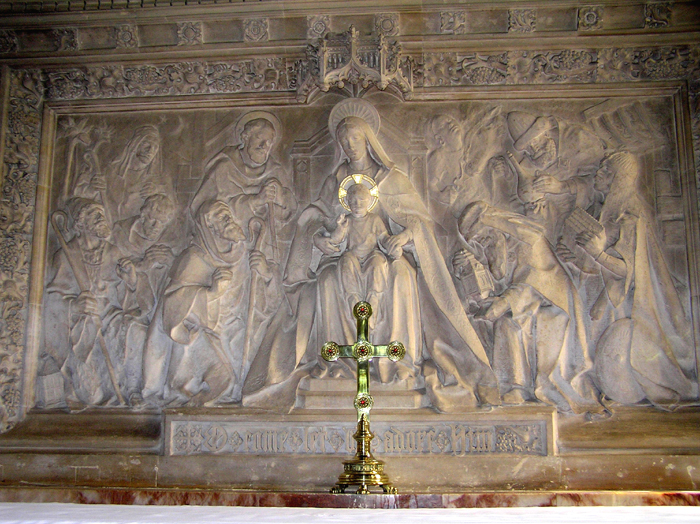
Reredos behind the high altar

The reredos beneath the east window in the main chancel is another reminder of the tragedy of the First World War. It was given in 1925 by Mr and Mrs Matthews of Wyke House in memory of two of their sons who were both killed in the war. Further examples of the work of Nathaniel Hitch (1846–1938), the sculptor responsible for the reredos, may be seen in Westminster Abbey and Truro and Bristol Cathedrals.

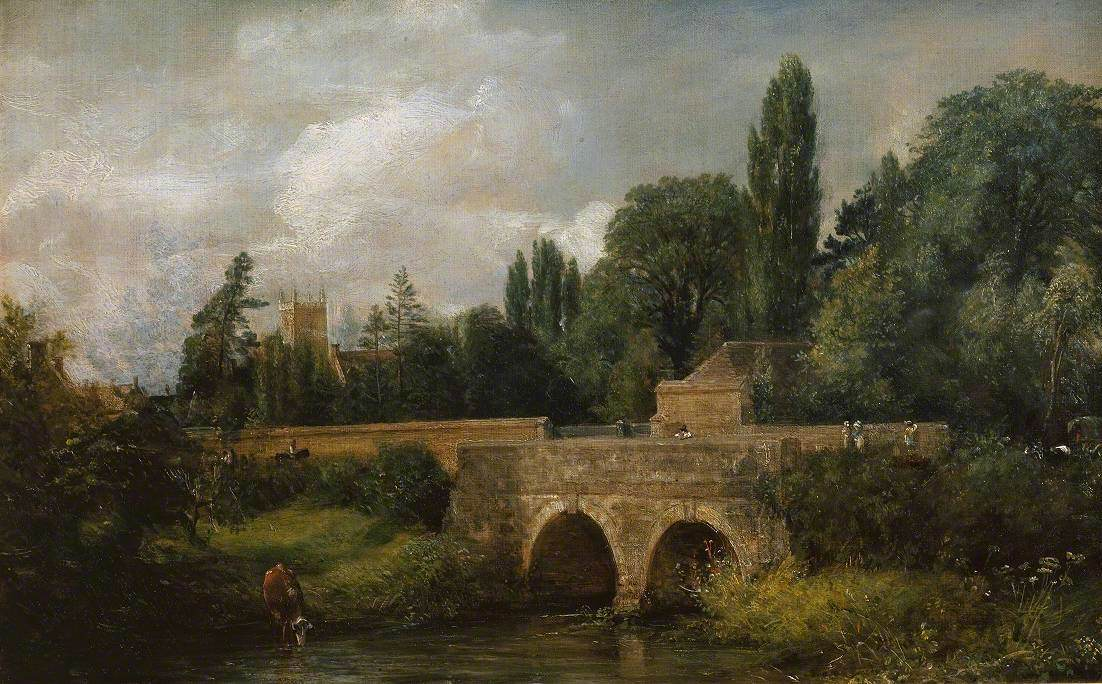
Gillingham Bridge by John Constable, 1823. The church tower is visible in the background.

Memorials to those who died in the First World War can be seen hanging above the Jacobean communion table in St. Catherine's Chapel. The Book of Remembrance nearby records all those who served in the two world wars and also those who died.

St. Mary's is still being enhanced as it has been over the centuries for the needs of the current worshipping community.
