= Bratton Seymour =

Village in Somerset, England

Coordinates: 51.0658°N 2.4671°W

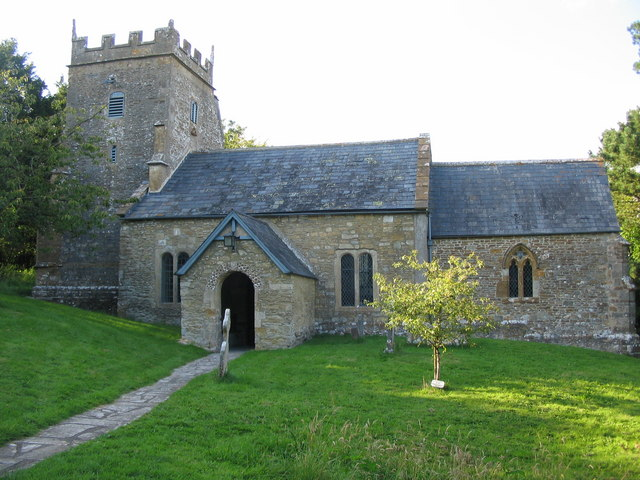
- Church of St Nicholas, Bratton Seymour

- Location within Somerset
- Population: 104 (2011)
- OS grid reference: ST673297
- Unitary authority: Somerset Council
- Ceremonial county: Somerset
- Region: South West
- Country: England
- Sovereign state: United Kingdom
- Post town: WINCANTON
- Postcode district: BA9
- Dialling code: 01963
- Police: Avon and Somerset
- Fire: Devon and Somerset
- Ambulance: South Western
- UK Parliament: Glastonbury and Somerton

Bratton Seymour is a village and civil parish in Somerset, England, situated on a tributary of the River Brue 4 miles (6.4 km) south-east of Castle Cary and 4 miles (6.4 km) north-west of Wincanton. The parish has a population of 104.

== History ==
The remains of a Roman villa, dating from 222 to 386, were discovered on Cattle Hill in 1966.

Bratton manor was held, like Wincanton, by Alfsi in 1066 and by Walter of Douai by the time of the Domesday Book in 1086, when it was known as Broctune meaning settlement on the brook. In the late 12th century land in the parish was given to Bruton Abbey, and later the lord of the manor were the Seymour family, whose name was incorporated into the village name. The parish of Bratton Seymour was part of the Norton Ferris Hundred.

A junction of the A371 just south of the village is known as Jack White's Gibbet as it was the site of the hanging of White for the murder of Robert Sutton in 1730.

== Governance ==
The parish council has responsibility for local issues, including setting an annual precept (local rate) to cover the council's operating costs and producing annual accounts for public scrutiny. The parish council evaluates local planning applications and works with the local police, district council officers, and neighbourhood watch groups on matters of crime, security, and traffic. The parish council's role also includes initiating projects for the maintenance and repair of parish facilities, as well as consulting with the district council on the maintenance, repair, and improvement of highways, drainage, footpaths, public transport, and street cleaning. Conservation matters (including trees and listed buildings) and environmental issues are also the responsibility of the council.

For local government purposes, since 1 April 2023, the village comes under the unitary authority of Somerset Council. Prior to this, it was part of the non-metropolitan district of South Somerset, which was formed on 1 April 1974 under the Local Government Act 1972, having previously been part of Wincanton Rural District.

It is also part of the Glastonbury and Somerton county constituency represented in the House of Commons of the Parliament of the United Kingdom. It elects one Member of Parliament (MP) by the first past the post system of election, and was part of the South West England constituency of the European Parliament prior to Britain leaving the European Union in January 2020, which elected seven MEPs using the d'Hondt method of party-list proportional representation.

== Religious sites ==
The Anglican parish Church of St Nicholas has Saxon origins. It was originally dedicated to St. Giles, and has also been known as Holy Trinity Church. It is designated as a Grade II* listed building.
