= Milton on Stour =

Village in Dorset, England

Coordinates: 51.0566°N 2.2851°W

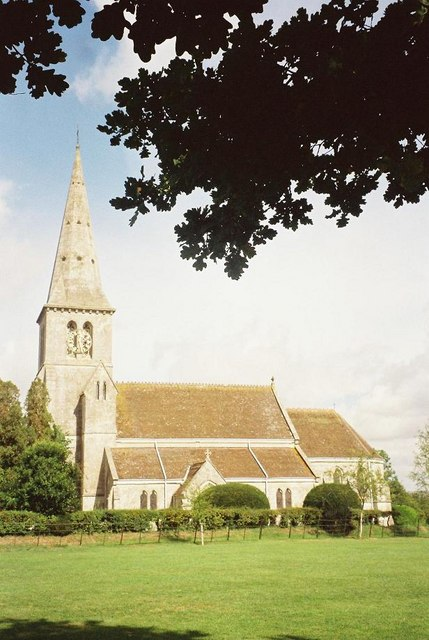
- Church of St Simon and St Jude, Milton on Stour

- Location within Dorset
- OS grid reference: ST801287
- Civil parish: Gillingham
- Unitary authority: Dorset
- Ceremonial county: Dorset
- Region: South West
- Country: England
- Sovereign state: United Kingdom
- Post town: Gillingham
- Postcode district: SP8
- Dialling code: 01747
- Police: Dorset
- Fire: Dorset and Wiltshire
- Ambulance: South Western
- UK Parliament: North Dorset

Milton on Stour is a small village in Dorset, England. It lies on the River Stour, a mile north of the town of Gillingham.

The Church of St Simon and St Jude, built in 1868, is a Grade II listed building.
