= Gillingham, Dorset =

Town and civil parish in Dorset, England

Coordinates: 51.0375°N 2.2748°W

Gillingham
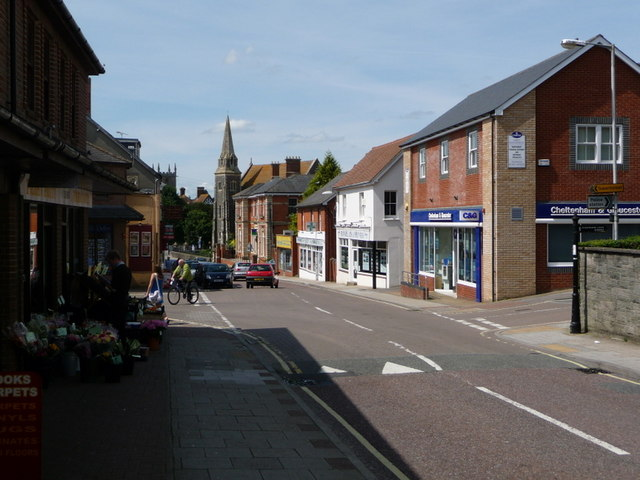
- High Street, Gillingham

- Location within Dorset
- Population: 11,505 (2021 census)
- OS grid reference: ST805265
  - London: 98.4 mi (158.4 km) ENE
- Civil parish: Gillingham
- Unitary authority: Dorset
- Ceremonial county: Dorset
- Region: South West
- Country: England
- Sovereign state: United Kingdom
- Post town: Gillingham
- Postcode district: SP8
- Dialling code: 01747
- Police: Dorset
- Fire: Dorset and Wiltshire
- Ambulance: South Western
- UK Parliament: North Dorset

Gillingham (/ˈɡɪlɪŋəm/ GHIL-ing-əm) is a town and civil parish in the Blackmore Vale area of Dorset, England. It lies on the B3095 and B3081 roads, approximately four miles (six kilometres) south of the A303 trunk road and five miles (eight kilometres) northwest of Shaftesbury. It is the most northerly town in the county.

In the 2021 census, the civil parish had a population of 11,505. The parish includes the hamlets of Eccliffe, Huntingford, Madjeston and Milton on Stour. The hamlets of Peacemarsh, Bay and Wyke have become part of the town as it has expanded.

Gillingham is pronounced with a hard initial "g" (/ɡ/), unlike Gillingham, Kent, which is pronounced with a soft "g" (/dʒ/).

== History ==
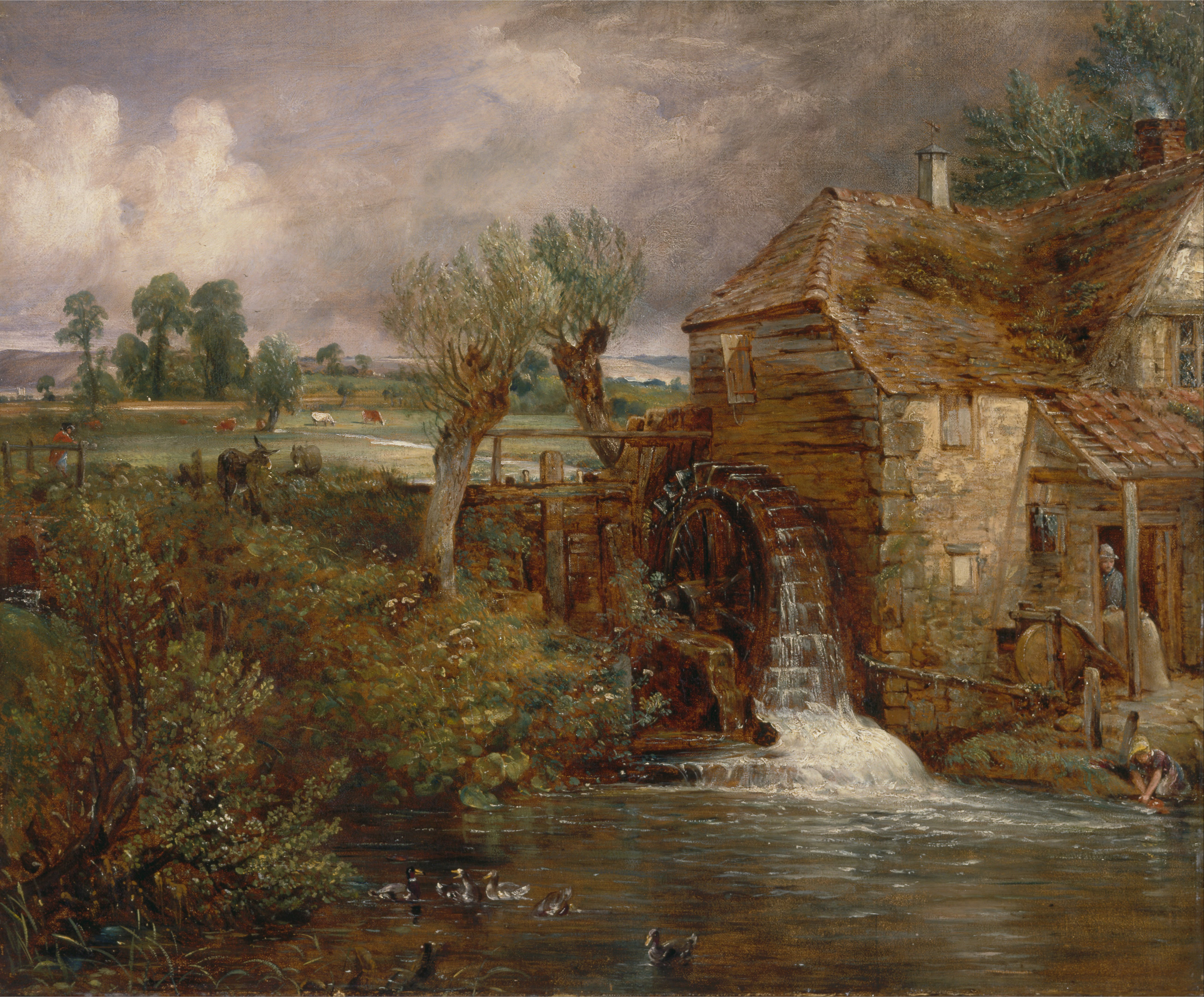
Parham Mill by John Constable, 1826.

There is a Stone Age barrow in the town, and evidence of Roman settlement in the 2nd and 3rd centuries; however the town was established by the Saxons. The church of St Mary the Virgin has a Saxon cross shaft dating from the 9th century.

The name Gillingham was used for the town in its 10th century Saxon charter, and also in an entry for 1016 in the annals, as the location of a battle between King Edmund Ironside and Danish King Cnut. In the Domesday Book in 1086 it is recorded as Gelingeham, and later spellings include Gellingeham in 1130, Gyllingeham in 1152 and Gilingeham in 1209. The name derives from a personal name plus the Old English inga and hām, and means a homestead of the family or followers of a man called Gylla.

Half of the town's population of 2,000 died of the Black Death in the four months following October 1348.

In the Middle Ages, Gillingham was the site of a royal hunting lodge, visited by kings Henry I, Henry II, John and Henry III. A nearby royal forest, Gillingham Forest, was set aside for the king's deer. The lodge fell into disrepair and was destroyed in 1369 by Edward III.

Edward Rawson, the first secretary to the Massachusetts Bay Colony, was born in Gillingham.

Gillingham became a local farming centre, gained the first grammar school in Dorset in 1516 and a silk mill in 1769. Gillingham's church has a 14th-century chancel, though most of the rest of the building was built in the 19th and 20th centuries. Many other buildings in the town are of Tudor origin.

In the 1820s, the artist John Constable stayed at Gillingham vicarage and, being impressed by the beauty of the countryside, executed several local sketches and paintings. His painting of the old town bridge is in the Tate Gallery. In the 1850s, the arrival of the railway to the town brought prosperity and new industries including brickmaking, cheese production, printing, soap manufacture and at the end of the 19th century one of the first petrol engine plants in the country. In the Second World War Gillingham's position on the railway from London to Exeter was key to its rapid growth. In 1940 and 1941 there was large-scale evacuation of London and other industrial cities to rural towns, particularly in the north, southwest and Wales. Gillingham grew rapidly because of this.

Gillingham was the centre of a liberty of the same name.

== Demography ==
In the 2021 census Gillingham civil parish had 5,187 households and a population of 11,505. The Office for National Statistics define a Gillingham Built-up Area which includes only the contiguous town, excluding outlying areas of the parish such as Eccliffe, Huntingford, Madjeston, Milton on Stour, and Slaughtergate; this had a population of 11,010 in 2021.

Census population of Gillingham parish
Census	Population	Female	Male	Households	Source
1921	3,294				
1931	3,274				
1951	3,352				
1961	3,619				
1971	4,050				
1981	5,440				
1991	6,740				
2001	9,323	4,898	4,425	4,099	
2011	11,756	5,992	5,764	5,107	
2021	11,505	5,997	5,508	5,187	

== Governance ==
At the lower level of local government, Gillingham has a town council which is elected in four electoral wards: Gillingham Town, Lodbourne, Milton and Wyke.

At the upper level, Gillingham is in Dorset unitary district. For elections to Dorset Council, it is grouped with several neighbouring parishes into Gillingham ward, which elects three councillors. From 1894 to 1974, Gillingham was in Shaftesbury rural district. It was then in North Dorset district until Dorset became unitary in 2019.

For elections to the UK parliament, Gillingham is in North Dorset constituency, which is currently represented in the UK parliament by the Conservative Simon Hoare.

== Economy and society ==
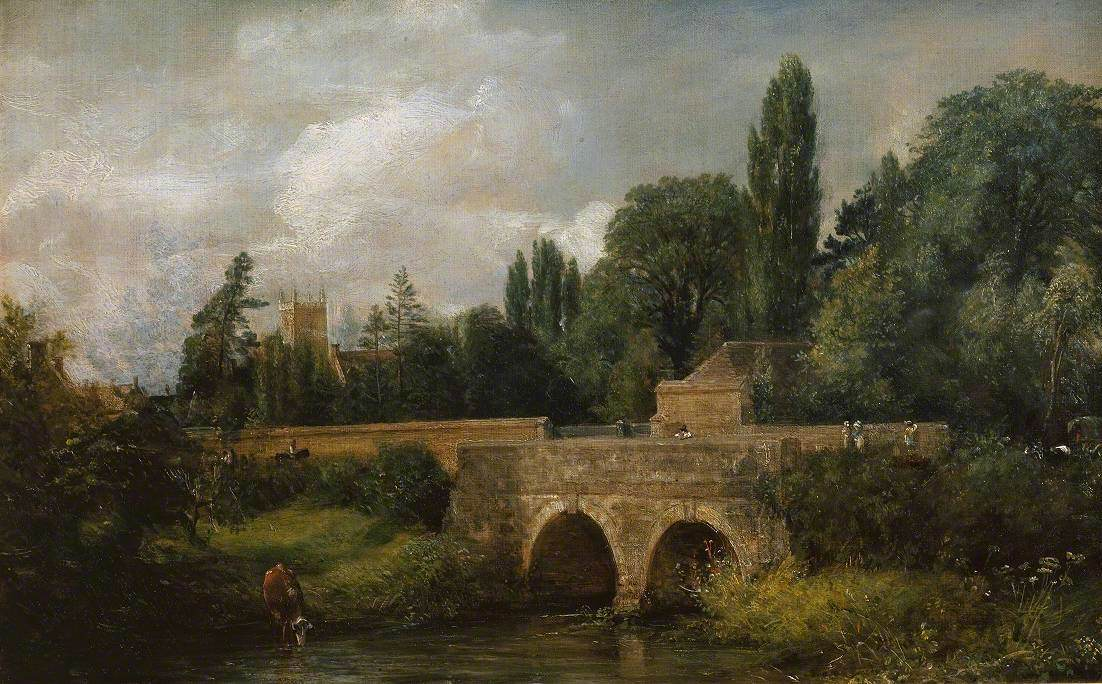
Gillingham Bridge by John Constable, 1823

Gillingham has good transport links, being 4 miles (6 kilometres) south of the A303, the main road from London to the South West, and having a railway station on the Exeter to London railway line. Salisbury is about 30 minutes away by train, and 50 minutes by car. It is approximately two hours into central London, with trains arriving at Waterloo.

The town has 70 shops and two commercial estates (Brickfields Business Park and Brickfields Industrial Estate) and the Gillingham education area has 7 primary schools(4 in the town) and 1 secondary school.

The town plays host to the annual 'Gillingham & Shaftesbury Show', which is an agricultural show held every August at the showground on the outskirts of the town. Gillingham Town Carnival is held every October.

The biggest sports club in the town is North Dorset Rugby Club. This is located at Slaughtergate on the west side of Gillingham. The town also has a Non-League football club, Gillingham Town, which plays at Woodwater Lane.

Until 2009, when it ceased for financial reasons, Gillingham hosted an annual 10-day festival of music and sport. Gillingham has had a brass band since 1928 and perform at civic events and carnivals.

== Media ==
Local news and television programmes are provided by BBC West and ITV West Country. Television signals are received from the Mendip TV transmitter.

Local radio stations are BBC Radio Solent, BBC Radio Somerset can also be received, Heart West, Greatest Hits Radio South (formerly Vale FM) and Alfred Radio, a community radio station which broadcast from Shaftesbury.

The town is served by the local newspapers, Gillingham News and Dorset Echo.

== See also ==
- List of hundreds in Dorset
