= Church of All Saints, Lopen =

Church in Somerset, England

Church of All Saints
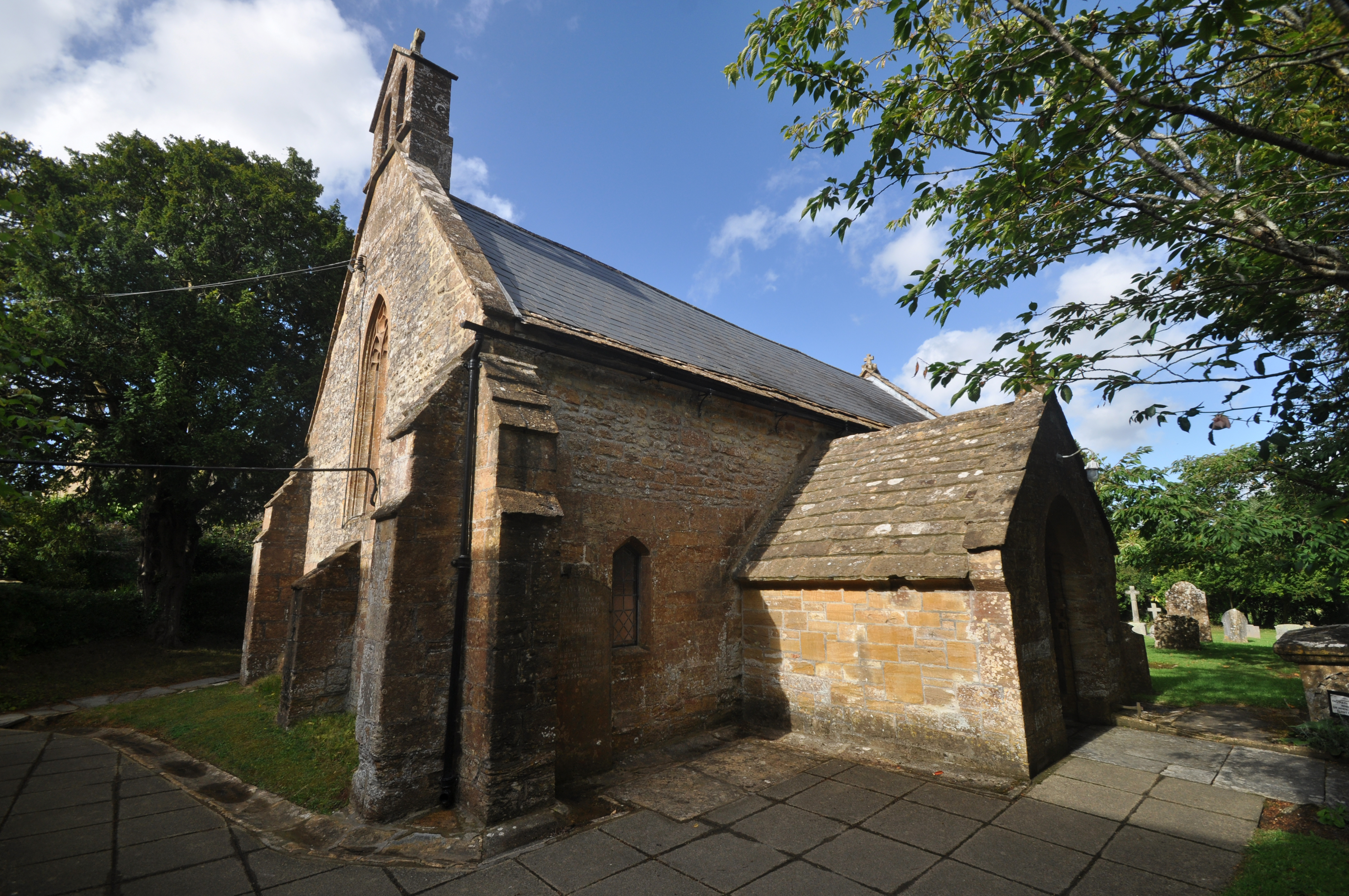

- Location within Somerset
- 50.9271°N 2.8165°W
- Location: Lopen, Somerset, England

History
- Built: 12th century

Listed Building – Grade II*
- Official name: Church of All Saints
- Designated: 4 February 1958
- Reference no.: 1056994

The Anglican Church of All Saints in Lopen, Somerset, England was built in the 12th century. It is a Grade II* listed building.

== History ==
The church was built in the 12th and 13th centuries but most of the current fabric is from the 14th and 15th. In 1833 the north transept was added and a Victorian restoration carried out between 1874 and 1886.

The parish is part of the benefice of Merriott with Hinton, Dinnington and Lopen within the Diocese of Bath and Wells.

== Architecture ==
The hamstone building has slate roofs with a small bell turret containing two bells. It has a three-bay nave, two-bay chancel supported by corner buttresses.

Inside the church is a gallery which was added in the late 18th or early 19th century, which now houses the organ. Most of the fittings are from the 18th or 19th century but the font is from the 13th. It contains a range of memorial slabs and tablets. A reconstruction of a panel from the Lopen Roman Mosaic was installed in the church.

== See also ==
- List of ecclesiastical parishes in the Diocese of Bath and Wells
