= Church of St Nicholas, Dinnington =

Church in Somerset, England

Church of St Nicholas
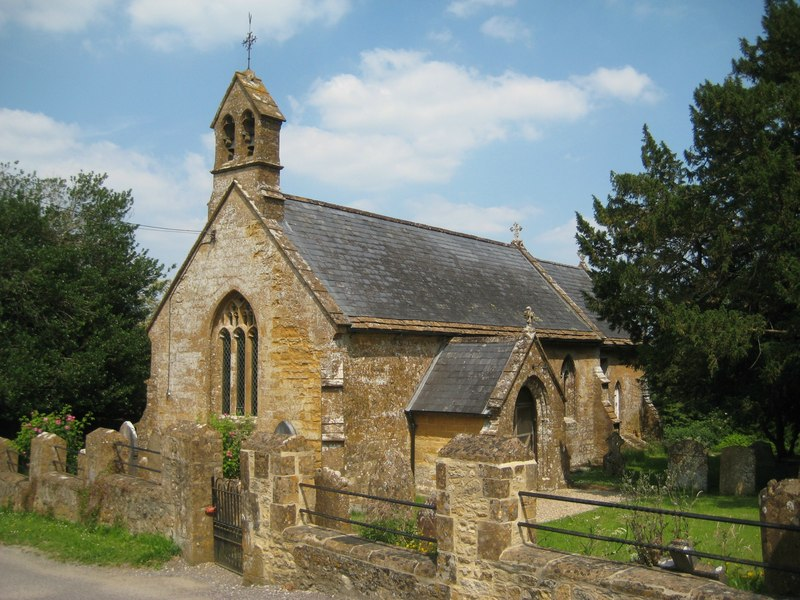

- Location within Somerset
- 50.9113°N 2.8505°W
- Location: Dinnington, Somerset, England

History
- Built: 15th century

Listed Building – Grade II*
- Official name: Church of St Nicholas
- Designated: 4 February 1958
- Reference no.: 1345887

The Anglican Church of St Nicholas in Dinnington, Somerset, England was built in the 15th century. It is a Grade II* listed building.

== History ==
A church was established in the village by 1207. The current building is mostly from the 15th century with restoration in 1863, which include the removal of a gallery.

It was originally a chapelry to Seavington St Mary.

The parish is part of the benefice of Merriott with Hinton, Dinnington and Lopen within the Diocese of Bath and Wells.

== Architecture ==
The hamstone building has slate roofs with a small bell turret. It has a two-bay chancel and three-bay nave.

The interiors fittings are mostly 19th century but there is a 13th-century recut decorated stone font.

== See also ==
- List of ecclesiastical parishes in the Diocese of Bath and Wells
