= Church of All Saints, Merriott =

Church in Somerset, England

Church of All Saints
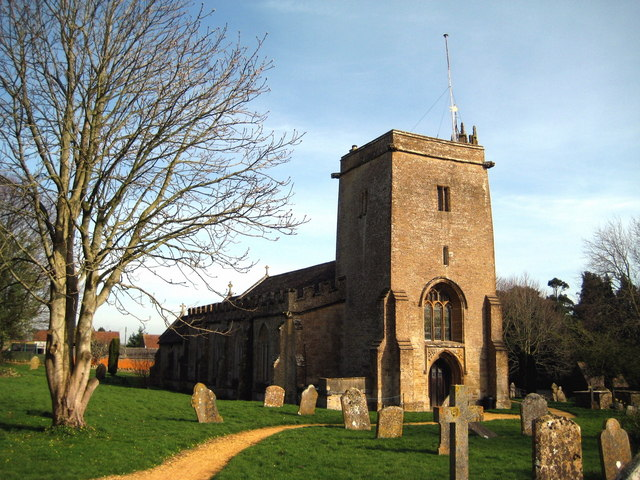

- Location within Somerset
- 50.9124°N 2.7941°W
- Location: Merriott, Somerset, England

History
- Built: 13th century

Listed Building – Grade II*
- Official name: Church of All Saints
- Designated: 4 February 1958
- Reference no.: 1175447

The Anglican Church of All Saints in Merriott, Somerset, England was built in the 13th century. It is a Grade II* listed building.

== History ==
The church was built in the 13th century. It was modified in the late 15th or early 16th century and then was extended, as part of a Victorian restoration. This included a new chancel and the removal of the galleries which had been erected in 1830. It was carried out in 1860 by Benjamin Ferrey. At one time the advowson was held by Muchelney Abbey.

The parish is part of the benefice of Merriott with Hinton, Dinnington and Lopen within the Diocese of Bath and Wells.

== Architecture ==
The hamstone building has a clay tiled roof. It consist of a four-bay nave and two-bay chancel with side aisles. The tower is supported by corner buttresses. There is a peal of six bells, the oldest of which were cast in the 1730s by the Bilbie family.

The interior fittings are from the 19th century restoration.

== See also ==
- List of ecclesiastical parishes in the Diocese of Bath and Wells
