= Anthony Paulet =

Arms of Paulet/Poulett: Sable, three swords pilewise points in base proper pomels and hilts or.

Sir Anthony Paulet (1562–1600) of Hinton St George, Somerset, was Governor of Jersey from 1588 until his death in 1600.

== Origins ==
He was born at Hinton St George, Somerset, the eldest son of Sir Amias Paulet (1532–1588) by his wife Margaret Hervey.

== Youth ==
Paulet grew up in Paris, where his father was Ambassador. In 1579 the elder Paulet took into his household as a tutor, Jean Hotman (1552–1636), (later Marquis de Villers-St-Paul) son of the famous author and professor of law Francis Hotman, to instruct his two sons. When the elder Paulet was recalled in November 1579, Hotman accompanied the family back to England and lived with his two pupils at Oxford.

== Career ==
He graduated as a Master of Arts at Oxford and eventually succeeded his father as Governor of Jersey.

== Marriage and children ==
In 1583 Paulet married Catherine Norris, daughter of Margery and Henry Norris, 1st Baron Norreys, by whom he had three children:

- John Poulett, 1st Baron Poulett (born c. 1585), only surviving son, elevated to the peerage in 1627.
- Susan Poulett (d.1673), wife of Sir Peter Prideaux, 2nd Baronet (1596–1682) of Netherton, Farway in Devon.
- Margery Poulett, wife of John Sydenham of Combe, Dulverton, Somerset, by whom she had 4 daughters.

== Landholdings ==
Paulet held the manor of East Lydford.

== Death and burial ==
Paulet died on 22 July 1600 and was buried in St George's Church, Hinton St George.

Political offices
Preceded by Amias Paulet	Governor of Jersey; 1588–1600	Succeeded by unknown
