= Dinnington =

Dinnington is an English place name. It may refer to the following places in England:

- Dinnington, Somerset
- Dinnington, South Yorkshire
- Dinnington, Tyne and Wear
