= Amias Paulet =

English diplomat and Governor of Jersey

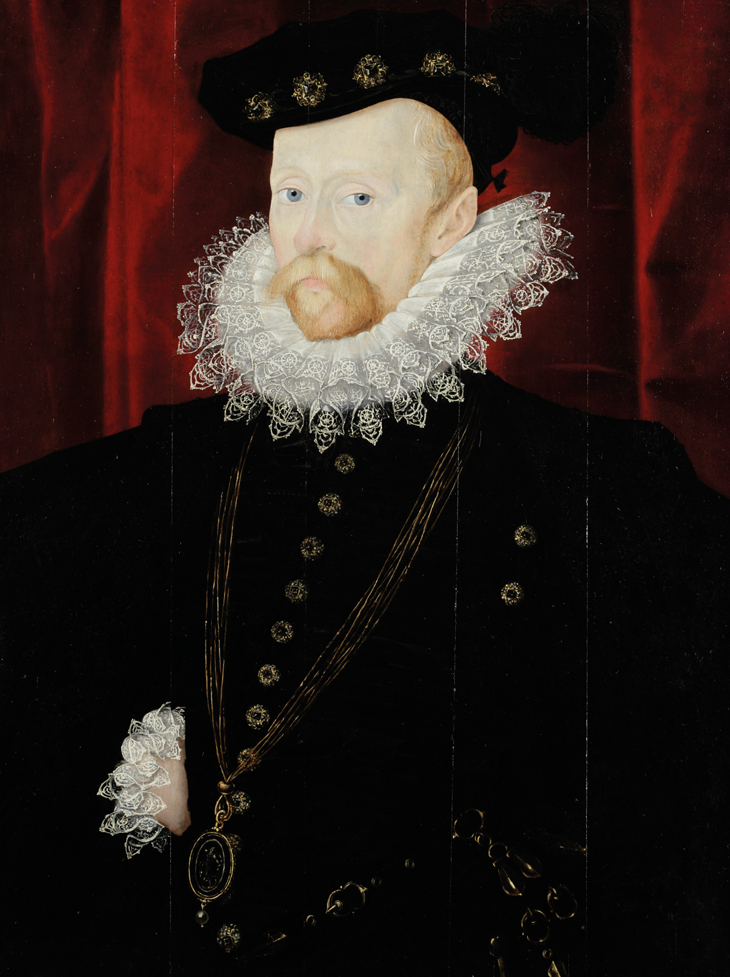
Sir Amias Paulet, 1576–78, attributed to Nicholas Hilliard

Arms of Poulett: Sable, three swords pilewise points in base proper pomels and hilts or

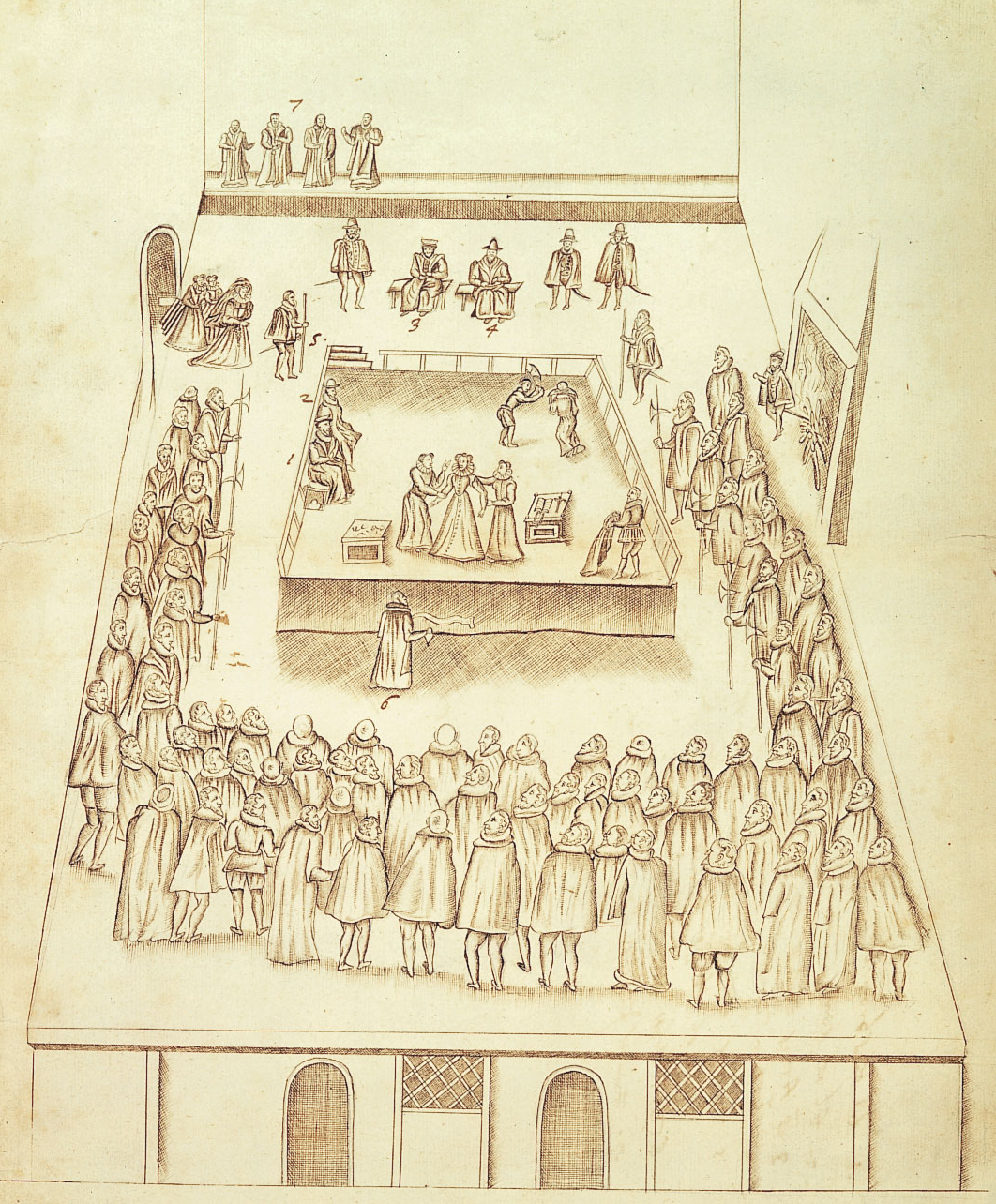
The execution of Mary, Queen of Scots at Fotheringhay Castle on 8 February 1587, drawn by Robert Beale, Clerk of the Privy Council, an eyewitness. Sir Amias Paulet, Mary's gaoler, is identified as 3, top, seated left below dais; the official witnesses, the Earls of Shrewsbury and Kent, are identified as numbers 1 and 2.

Sir Amias Paulet (1532 – 26 September 1588) of Hinton St. George, Somerset, was an English diplomat, Governor of Jersey, and the gaoler for a period of Mary, Queen of Scots.

== Origins ==
He was the son of Sir Hugh Paulet of Hinton St George by his wife Philippa Pollard, a daughter of Sir Lewis Pollard (c.1465 – 21 October 1526), Justice of the Common Pleas, of King's Nympton, Devon.

== Career ==
Paulet went to Jersey in 1550 when his father was made Governor and immediately acted as his assistant. The following year he was sent by his father to complain to the Privy Council that officials in Normandy were refusing to hand over six thieves who had escaped from Jersey. He was sent to Paris with a letter for the Constable of France, and thence to Normandy, returning ultimately to Jersey with his prisoners.

In 1556 he was formally appointed Lieutenant-Governor and by the end of the decade he was effectively running the island in his father's absence. He kept this post until 1573. His father Hugh died that year, and Paulet was made Governor, a post he held until his death. There was much concern at this time about invasion by the French and Paulet went on a spying mission to the Brittany coast to discover for himself whether ships and troops were being gathered. Nothing happened because the death of the French king brought a temporary cessation to threats against the Channel Islands. However, relations with nearby Normandy were not good, as shown by a letter from Amias to his father:

Mr St Aubin has been arrested by Mons Boisrougier of Coutances, and after fourteen days imprisonment dismissed with the loss of a goshawk and 20 ells of canvas. I wrote to this Monsieur for redress, but he answered he was sorry he had dismissed his prisoner, and that his stock was not better, advising me to look to myself, as he hoped to pluck me out of my house, as he had the Captain of Alderney. If I had the Queen's leave, I would ask no aid but the retinue of this Castle to pluck him out of his house.

Amias continued his father's work on strengthening Mont Orgueil Castle, despite the lack of funds available from Elizabeth. He wrote in 1557: "Though I have husbanded Her Majesty's money well I have been constrained to employ more than I received, and our walls want a third part yet". And in 1563: "I am much deceived, considering the depth of the foundation, the height and thickness of the walls, if a greater piece of work hath ever been done for the like sum". And again in 1573: "A strong piece of work, begun four or five years ago, lacks completion of one third. Four hundred pounds will be needed this year and four hundred next."

Like his father, Amias was strongly anti-Catholic, although more Calvinist than Protestant. When the first Huguenot refugees poured into Jersey in 1558 he appointed some of the priests among them as Rectors and ignored his father's wishes, and to an extent those of Queen Elizabeth, over which prayer book should be used in island churches. His appointment to the Town Church of Guillaume Morise, a Huguenot minister from Anjou, led to the establishment of what Chroniques de Jersey described as the first "real Reformed Church in Jersey".

There was a second influx of Huguenots in 1568 and they, too, were welcomed by Amias, although his father had reservations and wrote: "I approve my son's zeal in receiving these strangers, but I cannot like their continued abode in the isle. They should be passed on." But father and son got on well, despite these occasional disagreements, and in 1571 Amias was made joint-Governor, becoming sole Governor on his father's death, probably in 1578, although there are no records of the transition.

=== Ambassador in France ===
In 1576 Queen Elizabeth raised him to knighthood. His duties increasingly meant that Amias was absent from Jersey for long periods. He was appointed resident Ambassador in France for three years in 1576 and appointed Guillaume Lempriere, Seigneur of Trinity, as Lieutenant-Governor of Jersey.

Paulet was clearly well trusted, because Queen Elizabeth's principal secretary Francis Walsingham wrote: "Her Majesty wishes you in matters that concern her service to deal as you think fit, though you have no special direction, such trust she reposes in you." Elizabeth put the young Francis Bacon under his charge. In 1579, he took into his household the young Jean Hotman, son of Francis Hotman, to tutor his two sons Anthony and George. When the family returned to England, the tutor and his two charges settled at Oxford.

Paulet sent a new design of farthingale to Elizabeth I in March 1577 which was worn by Louise of Lorraine and Margaret of Valois. He sent dress fabrics to Elizabeth and asked Walsingham to ensure the silks were of adequate quality. He also obtained a type of fur muff for Elizabeth, known as a "countenance". Paulet was in this embassy until he was recalled November 1579. He was present in Jersey in 1583 for the swearing-in of his son Anthony as Lieutenant-Governor and his brother George as Bailiff, before leaving to join the Privy Council.

== Paulet and Mary, Queen of Scots ==
A fanatical Puritan with a harsh character, Paulet was appointed gaoler of Mary, Queen of Scots, by Elizabeth in January 1585, first at Tutbury Castle and then at Chartley Manor, and guarded her very strictly. He replaced the more tolerant Sir Ralph Sadler and his assistant John Somers who had given Mary far more liberty. He remained her keeper until Mary's execution at Fotheringhay Castle on 8 February 1587.

During his time with the Scottish Queen at Chartley, Paulet wrote to Francis Walsingham describing the activities of women who contributed to Mary's secret correspondence. Paulet discovered that a gentlewoman living near the castle helped send Mary's letters to her son James VI. The laundry women lived and worked outside the castle, and might become a security risk. Mary's ladies in waiting could be conduits of foreign news. Letters addressed to the women of the household might attract less scrutiny. Paulet tried to recruit laundrywomen from Somerset, without local connections and so less likely to be useful to Mary's helpers, but none would travel so far for work. Walsingham also instructed Paulet to prevent Mary's household distributing alms or charity to houses outside the castle.

In September 1586, Paulet invited Mary to go riding in the countryside, but it was a ruse and she was taken to Fotheringhay Castle where she was made to stand trial for treason. After Mary's conviction, Walsingham wrote to Paulet requesting he assassinate Mary, to spare Elizabeth from involvement in her death. In a letter to Walsingham, Paulet refused to "make so great a shipwreck of my conscience, or leave so great a blot to my poor posterity, as shed blood without law or warrant". He was the appointed Chancellor of the Order of the Garter.

== Marriage and progeny ==
He married Margaret Harvey, a daughter of Antony Harvey, of Columbjohn in Devon, an "expert surveyor", by whom he had three sons and three daughters:

- Hugh Paulet (b. 1558), the eldest son, who predeceased his father.
- Anthony Paulet (b. 1562), eldest surviving son and heir, who also succeeded his father as Governor of Jersey. His son was John Poulett, 1st Baron Poulett (born c. 1585).
- George Paulet (b. 1565), who married his distant cousin Elizabeth Paulet, daughter and heiress of Edward Paulet of Goathurst, in Somerset
- Joan Paulet, wife of Robert Haydon (1560–1626) of Bowood, Epford and Cadhay House in Devonshire.
- Sarah Paulet, second wife of Sir Francis Vincent, 1st Baronet (c. 1568 – 1640) of Stoke d'Abernon, in Surrey. Sir Francis Vincent's third wife was Eleanor Mallet (1573–1645), the widow and step-first cousin of Sir Arthur Acland (died 1610) of Acland in the parish of Landkey, and of Columbjohn in the parish of Broadclyst, Devon.
- Elizabeth Paulet, died unmarried.

== Death and burial ==
Paulet died in London on 26 September 1588 and was buried in the church of St Martin-in-the-Fields. However, his remains and monument were later removed to the Church of St George, Hinton St George, after the original church was rebuilt. His name (as "Amyas le Poulet") was used by Mark Twain for a character in A Connecticut Yankee in King Arthur's Court.

== Works ==
- Paulet, Amias (1874). Morris, John (ed.). The letter-books of Sir Amias Poulet, keeper of Mary Queen of Scots.

== See also ==
- Elizabeth R
- Elizabeth: The Golden Age

== Sources ==
- Jersey Through the Centuries: A Chronology, Leslie Sinel, Jersey, (1984)
- Mary, Queen of Scots, Antonia Fraser, (1971), Dell Publishing Company, Inc., New York
- Letter books of Amias Paulet, Morris, John, ed., (1874)
- Copy-book of Sir Amias Poulet's letters, written during his embassy to France, Ogle, Octavius, ed., (1866), Roxburghe Club

Political offices
| Preceded by Sir Hugh Paulet | Governor of Jersey; 1571–1588 | Succeeded by Anthony Paulet |
| Preceded by Sir Hugh Paulet | Custos Rotulorum of Somerset bef. 1577–1588 | Succeeded by Sir John Popham |
