= Lopen =

Village in Somerset, England

Coordinates: 50.9270°N 2.8195°W

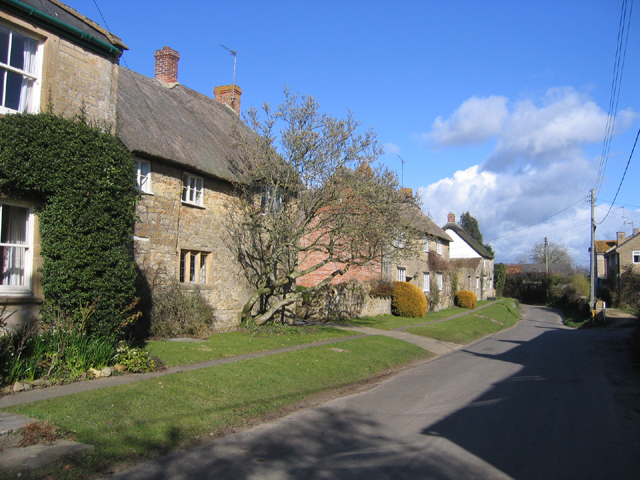
- Church Street, Lopen

- Location within Somerset
- Population: 260 (2011)
- OS grid reference: ST425145
- Unitary authority: Somerset Council
- Ceremonial county: Somerset
- Region: South West
- Country: England
- Sovereign state: United Kingdom
- Post town: SOUTH PETHERTON
- Postcode district: TA13
- Dialling code: 01460
- Police: Avon and Somerset
- Fire: Devon and Somerset
- Ambulance: South Western
- UK Parliament: Yeovil

Lopen is a village and civil parish in Somerset, England, situated 8 miles (12.9 km) west of Yeovil. The village has a population of 260 people.

== History ==
The name of the village means Lufa's pen or fold.

A Roman mosaic, probably from a Roman villa, was found in the village in 2001. The Lopen Roman Mosaic was discovered by George Caton who was operating a mechanical digger and noticed small cubes of coloured stone, which turned out to be part of the floor of an eight-roomed Roman Villa and is the largest Roman Mosaic so far discovered in Britain. Photogrammetry by English Heritage was followed by excavation led by the Somerset County Council archaeologist exposed and documented the mosaic in three weeks. It was then covered with sand and soil to preserve it. The work was recognised with the award of the Tarmac Finders Award (for non professionals) at the British Archaeological Awards in 2002. The stones used for the mosaic are Blue Lias from the surrounding hills. The fragments which were discovered in the surrounding soil were used to create a new mosaic, featuring a cantharus, using methods which would have been available in Roman times. It is now displayed in All Saints Church.

Lopen is listed in the Domesday Book, with three manors, one of which was held by the Knights Templar. These were bought by the Earls Poulett of Hinton St George in 1560s. The parish of Lopen was part of the South Petherton Hundred.

In the 18th century the parish was noted for flax growing and for the production of linen sailcloth and twine. These industries continuing until the end of World War II. A mill had first been recorded in the parish around 1285. The mill was a water/grist mill until the mid 18th, then becoming jointly used as a grain mill and for linen production.

== Governance ==
The parish council has responsibility for local issues, including setting an annual precept (local rate) to cover the council's operating costs and producing annual accounts for public scrutiny. The parish council evaluates local planning applications and works with the local police, district council officers, and neighbourhood watch groups on matters of crime, security, and traffic. The parish council's role also includes initiating projects for the maintenance and repair of parish facilities, as well as consulting with the district council on the maintenance, repair, and improvement of highways, drainage, footpaths, public transport, and street cleaning. Conservation matters (including trees and listed buildings) and environmental issues are also the responsibility of the council.

For local government purposes, since 1 April 2023, the parish comes under the unitary authority of Somerset Council. Prior to this, it was part of the non-metropolitan district of South Somerset (established under the Local Government Act 1972). It was part of Chard Rural District before 1974.

Lopen is part of the Yeovil county constituency represented in the House of Commons of the Parliament of the United Kingdom. It elects one Member of Parliament (MP) by the first past the post system of election.

== Geography ==
The parish of Lopen is bounded to the north by the A303 Trunk Road and to the south by Lopen Brook with the road from South Petherton to Merriott, Crewkerne and the south coast running through the middle. Between Lopenhead and Lopen the road crosses the ancient Roman Fosse Way, which at this point is just a minor country lane.

== Religious sites ==
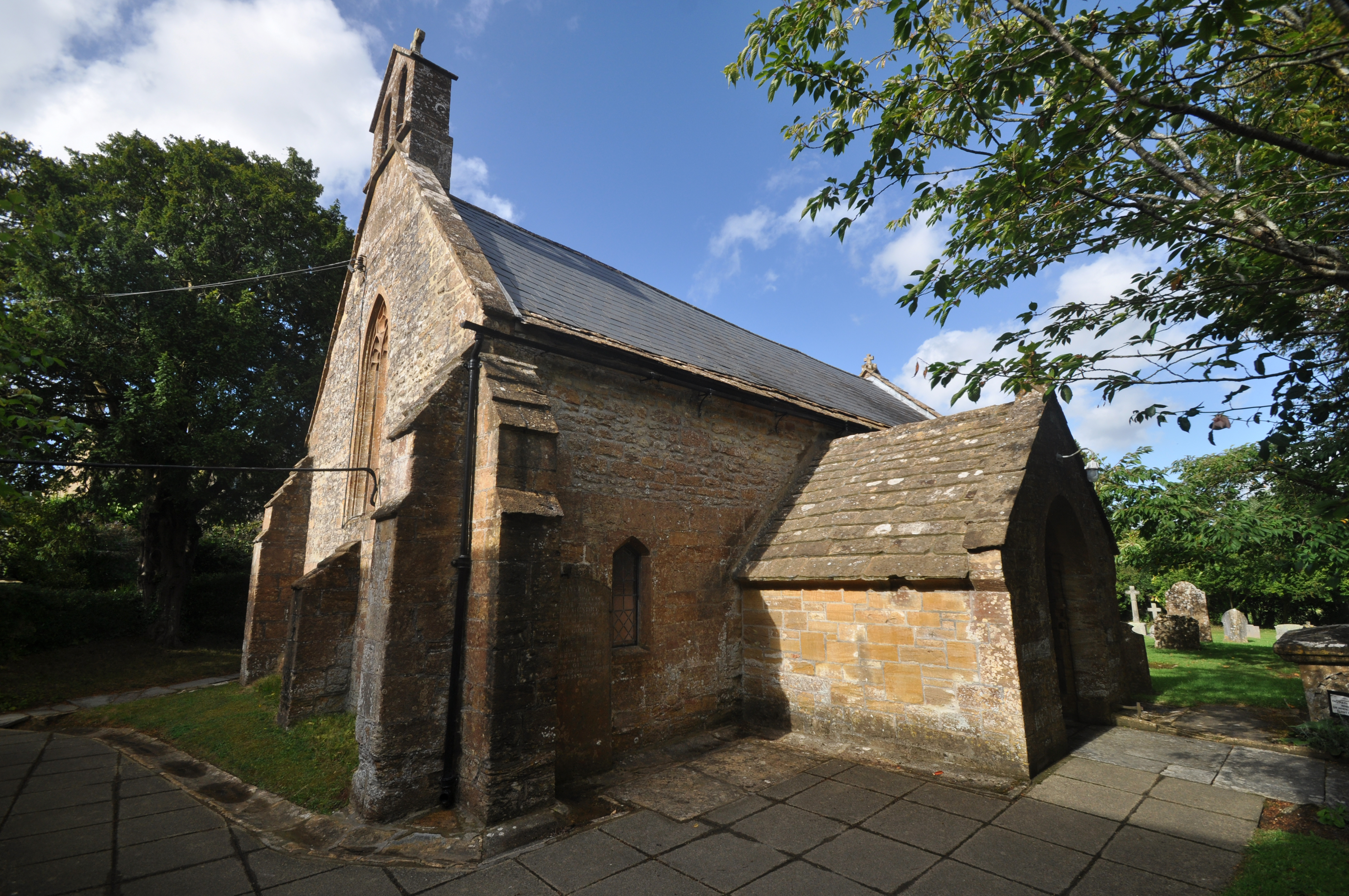
The parish church

The Anglican parish Church of All Saints has 12th- or 13th-century origins, but was largely rebuilt in the 14th and 15th centuries with the north transept being added in 1833. As Lopen chapel it was granted to Bruton Priory in 1209 becoming dependent on South Petherton church, later passing to Bristol Cathedral and obtaining burial rights in 1574.

== Culture ==
Punkie Night is celebrated in the village of Hinton St George each October.
