= Lopen Roman Mosaic =

Roman mosaic

Coordinates: 50.9222°N 2.8159°W

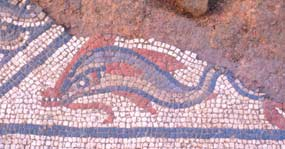
A section of the mosaic

The Lopen Roman Mosaic is a Roman mosaic, probably from a Roman villa, in the village of Lopen, Somerset, England.

It was discovered in 2001 by George Caton, who was operating a mechanical digger and noticed small cubes of coloured stone, which turned out to be part of the floor of an eight-roomed Roman villa and is the largest Roman mosaic so far discovered in Britain. Photogrammetry by English Heritage was followed by excavation led by the Somerset County Council archaeologist. They exposed and documented the mosaic in three weeks. It was then covered with sand and soil to preserve it. The work was recognised with the award of the Tarmac Finders Award (for non professionals) at the British Archaeological Awards in 2002. The stones used for the mosaic are Blue Lias from the surrounding hills. The fragments which were discovered in the surrounding soil were used to create a new mosaic, including a picture of a dolphin, using methods which would have been available in Roman times. It is now displayed in All Saints Church.

A further mosaic was found in an adjoining room, which probably extended beyond the area excavated, which was about 4.5 metres square. The main mosaic is almost 7 metres square and has a complicated geometrical design, including some stylized figurative elements such as leaves, cups and dolphins. It was probably laid by a putative specialist workshop based at Cirencester, known as the "Saltire school" for their fondness for saltires in designs, which is seen here. The walls of these rooms were probably also painted on plaster, but no traces survive here. The suite probably functioned as a dining room
