= Jean Hotman, Marquis de Villers-St-Paul =

Jean Hotman, Marquis de Villiers-St-Paul (1552 – 1636) was a French diplomat. Although he came from a Calvinist family, who had been exiled during the French Wars of Religion, Jean, through cultivating connections with Henry IV eventually was restored to a portion of his patrimony.

== Early life ==
Hotman was the eldest son of the famous jurist and author François Hotman. He was born in Lausanne because his family was in exile during the Wars of Religion in France. His father, although heir to an estate, did not take the title of Marquis because his adherence to Protestantism distanced him from his extended family.

Due in part to the religious conflicts, the family moved often. From 1555 to 1563, they were in Strasbourg, from 1563 to 1566 in Valence, from 1566 to 1572, in Bourges, from 1572 to 1578 in Geneva. In 1578, they moved for the last time to Basel where Jean's father Francis would die in 1590.

Jean studied law at Valence, graduating before 1568. He later went to Paris in 1578, and through his father's influence, was named a tutor in the household of the English Ambassador to Paris, Sir Amias Paulet (ambassador 1576–1579). He tutored Amias' two sons, Anthony and George. When Amias was recalled to England in November 1579, Jean followed him there to continue tutoring his sons. Sir Francis Bacon also traveled with Sir Amias during this time 1577–78, and it is possible they knew each other.

== Middle life ==
In March 1580, Jean, Anthony and George settled at Oxford where he became acquainted with many current or soon-to-be famous persons. Jean graduated from the University of Oxford in 1581, with a doctorate in law. Anthony Paulet would later receive an M.A. and eventually succeeded his father as Governor of Jersey(see DNB, XV, pg 527). His three-years-younger brother George took another route with a good marriage (see DNB, XV, pg 528).

While at Oxford, Jean fell in with a group of fellows including Richard Hakluyt, Henry Cuffe (1563–1601) and Sir Philip Sidney. Through Philip Sidney and Amias Paulet, Hotman caught the attention of Philip's uncle Robert Dudley, Earl of Leicester, the Chancellor of the University, who around May/Oct 1582, engaged him as one of his secretaries. This brought Hotman to the court of Queen Elizabeth.

Despite this, he moved back to the continent. He was at Caen in 1584, where he was nominated "prieur du college des droits", but he left when they would not pay him. About 1584 or 1585, he was married, probably in France, to Renee de St Martin, the former lady-in-waiting to Penelope Devereux, Lady Rich. And on 14 January 1585, he was appointed counsellor and master of requests by Henry of Navarre, the future Henry IV.

He returned to England, where he followed Leicester to the Low Countries in May 1585, and when Leicester returned to England, he left Hotman behind as his agent, with the special commission to pacify the troubles in Utrecht. He performed this task well and wrote to Leicester but had the effrontery to write directly to Queen Elizabeth for which Leicester upbraided him. This did not lead to a permanent breach for "When Leicester after his second stay in the Netherlands, returned to England (Dec 1587), Hotman was one of his retinue." (Posthumus, pg 40)

In 1588, he was appointed Prebendary of Ilfracombe with an income of 28 pounds, although mostly eaten up by taxes and expenses. In March 1588, he was entered at Gray's Inn, but apparently did not embark on a legal career.

== In Scotland ==
In August 1589 Hotman travelled to Scotland, to Edinburgh and then met the king James VI at Falkland Palace. He carried letters from the Earl of Essex, and possibly from Penelope, Lady Rich. An Englishman at the Scottish court, Thomas Fowler, reported that Hotman had many secret conversations with the king. Hotman may have advocated that James VI marry Catherine of Bourbon.

Jean Hotman accompanied James VI to Falkland Palace in August 1589. James VI gave him a jewel and a ring with a diamond set in a star. Hotman returned to Edinburgh and then stayed at Whittingehame Tower on 20 August 1589 with Richard Douglas. He may have travelled to London in the company of the poet Henry Constable.

== Later life ==
Upon the death of his father in 1590, he returned to France to settle the estate and became the guardian of his three unmarried sisters. One of these, Suzanne has a marriage contract dated 1594 in Paris. She is perhaps the most well-known of his sisters, having known modern descendants in Canada and the United States, which has made her and especially her husband, the subject of a few scholarly articles.

Hotman wrote a treatise that was published in 1603 called L'ambassadeur (The Ambassador); it was the first diplomatic manual written in the French language and was also translated into English. In it he warned diplomats against hiring servants from the country to which they were assigned for fear these hirelings would act as spies. He even recommended that ambassadors take their wives with them to supervise their households in order to prevent its members from revealing sensitive information to outsiders. On the topic of court entertainment, Hotman maintained that, while there were advantages to engaging with festivities, ambassadors should not be swayed by flattery or impressive displays. Ambassadors were also advised to avoid drinking or playing games since it could reflect poorly on the head of state they were representing.

At one point, he apparently received in France the title of Comte (Count) d'Hotman. Sometime before 1619, he was French ambassador to the Duchy of Berg at Düsseldorf.
