= St George's Church, Hinton St George =

Church in Somerset, England

Church of St George
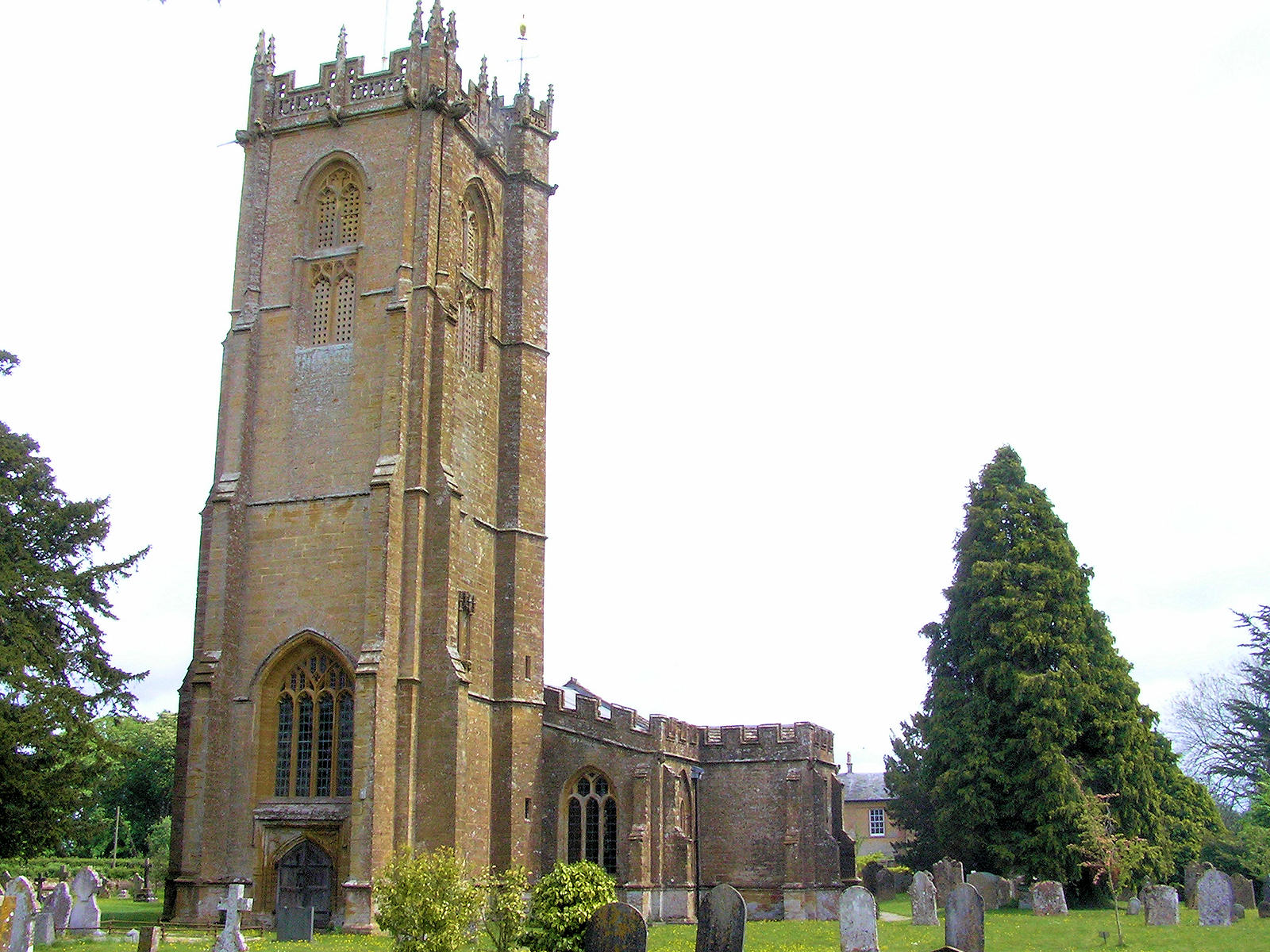

- Location within Somerset
- 50°54′39″N 2°49′38″W
- Location: Hinton St George, Somerset, England

History
- Built: 13th century

Listed Building – Grade I
- Official name: Church of St George
- Designated: 4 February 1958
- Reference no.: 1056124

The Church of St George in Hinton St George, Somerset, England includes 13th-century work by masons of Wells Cathedral, and has been designated as a Grade I listed building.

The vestry and north chapel of 1814 are said to be by James Wyatt, however it is more likely to be by Jeffry Wyatt, (later Sir Jeffry Wyattville). The four-stage tower is dated to 1485–95. It is supported by full-height offset corner buttresses, and has battlemented parapets with quatrefoil panels below merlons on the corner and intermediate pinnacles. The weathervane was added in 1756 by Thomas Bagley of Bridgwater. There is a hexagonal south-east corner stair turret. Stage 2 has small light on the north side and a statue niche on the south. All the faces on the two upper stages 2-light mullioned, transomed and traceried window under pointed arched labels, with pierced stone baffles. The clockface is under the east window.

During restoration work the parapet of the tower was examined and a stone was discovered with a carved date of 1731 which suggests that the decorative parapet may have been added then. The tracery on the north side has been marked out but never cut. In general there is little sign of more than one phase of construction although repairs are evident.

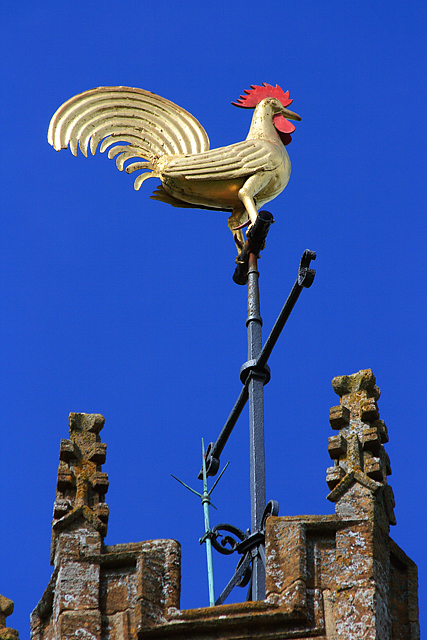
The weathercock on the church tower.

Anthony Paulet is buried at St George's. The Paulet mausoleum includes several Earl Poulett family tombs and an effigy of Sir Amias Paulet, which was originally in St Martin-in-the-Fields but later moved to Hinton St George. Between 2007 and 2014 restoration work on the memorial included the replacement of corroded ironwork within the tombs.

== Other burials ==
- Amias Paulet (d. 1538)
- Hugh Paulet
- John Poulett, 1st Baron Poulett
- John Poulett, 2nd Baron Poulett
- John Poulett, 3rd Baron Poulett
- John Poulett, 1st Earl Poulett
- John Poulett, 2nd Earl Poulett
- Vere Poulett, 3rd Earl Poulett
- John Poulett, 4th Earl Poulett

== See also ==
- List of Grade I listed buildings in South Somerset
- List of towers in Somerset
- List of ecclesiastical parishes in the Diocese of Bath and Wells
