= Dinnington, Somerset =

Village in Somerset, England

Coordinates: 50.9088°N 2.8476°W

Dinnington
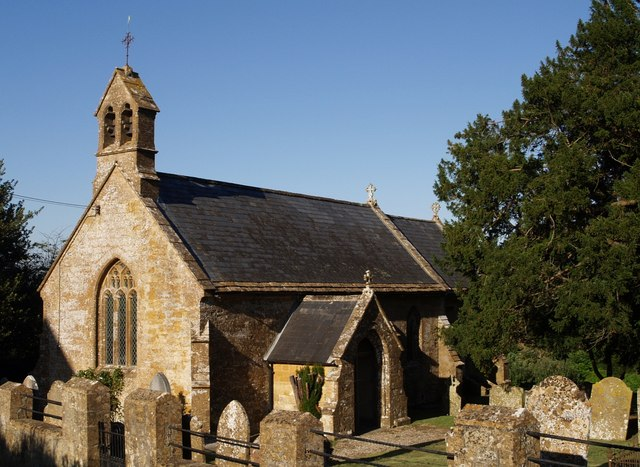
- St Nicholas' Church

- Location within Somerset
- Population: 65 (2011)
- OS grid reference: ST405125
- Unitary authority: Somerset
- Ceremonial county: Somerset
- Region: South West
- Country: England
- Sovereign state: United Kingdom
- Post town: HINTON ST. GEORGE
- Postcode district: TA17
- Dialling code: 01460
- Police: Avon and Somerset
- Fire: Devon and Somerset
- Ambulance: South Western
- UK Parliament: Yeovil

Dinnington is a village and civil parish in the English county of Somerset, situated 4 miles (6.4 km) north of Crewkerne in the South Somerset district. The village has a population of 65.

== History ==
The name Dinnington means the settlement of Dynne's people.

The parish was crossed by the Fosse Way and nearby there is evidence of a Roman villa, which was excavated by the archaeological television programme Time Team in 2002 and 2006. The Romano British site has been the site of surface finds of tesserae, roofing slates and pottery. A number of coins have been found and also a small bronze dog.

The manor was held at the time of the Domesday Book in 1086 by Siward the falconer. The parish of Dinnington was part of the South Petherton Hundred. In the 15th century the manor passed to the Pouletts of Hinton St George.

== Governance ==
The parish council has responsibility for local issues, including setting an annual precept (local rate) to cover the council's operating costs and producing annual accounts for public scrutiny. The parish council evaluates local planning applications and works with the local police, district council officers, and neighbourhood watch groups on matters of crime, security, and traffic. The parish council's role also includes initiating projects for the maintenance and repair of parish facilities, as well as consulting with the district council on the maintenance, repair, and improvement of highways, drainage, footpaths, public transport, and street cleaning. Conservation matters (including trees and listed buildings) and environmental issues are also the responsibility of the council.

For local government purposes, since 1 April 2023, the parish comes under the unitary authority of Somerset Council. Prior to this, it was part of the non-metropolitan district of South Somerset (established under the Local Government Act 1972). It was part of Chard Rural District before 1974.

It is also part of the Yeovil county constituency represented in the House of Commons of the Parliament of the United Kingdom. It elects one Member of Parliament (MP) by the first past the post system of election.

== Religious sites ==
The Anglican parish Church of St Nicholas was established by 1207. The current building is mostly from the 15th century with restoration in 1863. It was originally a chapelry to Seavington St Mary.

In 1873 a Bible chapel was built and continued to be used by the Methodists until 1956. In 1964 it was taken over by the Elim Pentecostal Church at Merriott.
