= Merriott =

Village in Somerset, England

Coordinates: 50.9092°N 2.7907°W

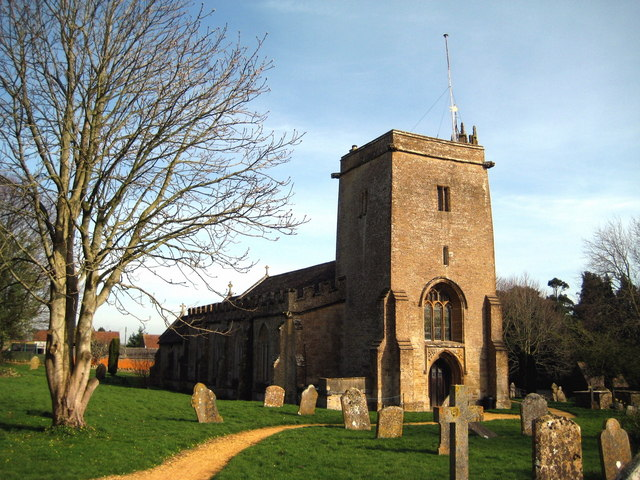
- All Saints Church, Merriott

- Location within Somerset
- Population: 1,979 (2011)
- OS grid reference: ST445125
- Unitary authority: Somerset
- Ceremonial county: Somerset
- Region: South West
- Country: England
- Sovereign state: United Kingdom
- Post town: MERRIOTT
- Postcode district: TA16
- Dialling code: 01460
- Police: Avon and Somerset
- Fire: Devon and Somerset
- Ambulance: South Western
- UK Parliament: Yeovil

Merriott is a village and civil parish in Somerset, England, near the town of Crewkerne and 7 miles (11.3 km) west of Yeovil in the South Somerset district. The village has a population of 1,979.

On Church Street, there is a well-preserved tithe barn, which is used by local organisations including the playgroup, badminton club and a Morris dancing side (Dr Turberville's Morris). The village is home to Merriott Rovers F.C. who play in the Perry Street and District League, spanning Somerset, Dorset and Devon. Also situated in Merriott is Budgens an all-purpose food store. It has one pub: the 17th century King's Head

The parish boundary includes the River Parrett which is crossed by the Bow Bridge. Next to it is Bow Mill House, with its attached watermill which dates from the 17th century. Tail Mill was used for sail cloth manufacture.

== History ==
The name Merriott means boundary gate from the Old English Maergeat.

The manor was held at the time of the Domesday Book in 1086 by Harding son of Eadnorth whose descendants took the name of the village and continued until the death of Sir John de Meriet in 1391. The good quality of the soil led to the development of market-gardening, with the first use in England of the word nursery (noresire) occurred at Merriot in 1369.

The parish was part of the hundred of Crewkerne.

Major rebuilding took place in the village following a fire in 1811.

The school building dates from 1876, and now incorporates the former Sunday school which was built in 1834.

== Governance ==
The parish council has responsibility for local issues, including setting an annual precept (local rate) to cover the council's operating costs and producing annual accounts for public scrutiny. The parish council evaluates local planning applications and works with the local police, district council officers, and neighbourhood watch groups on matters of crime, security, and traffic. The parish council's role also includes initiating projects for the maintenance and repair of parish facilities, as well as consulting with the district council on the maintenance, repair, and improvement of highways, drainage, footpaths, public transport, and street cleaning. Conservation matters (including trees and listed buildings) and environmental issues are also the responsibility of the council.

For local government purposes, since 1 April 2023, the parish comes under the unitary authority of Somerset Council. Prior to this, it was part of the non-metropolitan district of South Somerset (established under the Local Government Act 1972). It was part of Chard Rural District before 1974.

The village falls within Eggwood electoral ward. Merriott is the most populous area but the ward stretches to Dinnington in the west. The total population for this ward taken at the 2011 census was 2,421.

It is also part of the Yeovil county constituency represented in the House of Commons of the Parliament of the United Kingdom. It elects one Member of Parliament (MP) by the first past the post system of election.

== Religious sites ==
The Anglican parish Church of All Saints dates from the 13th century, with modifications in the late 15th or early 16th century, and major restoration including the extension of the nave, a new chancel and chapels by Benjamin Ferrey in 1860. It has been designated as a Grade II* listed building.

== Notable people ==
- Francis Trask (1840 – 6 April 1910) was a 20th-century Member of the New Zealand Legislative Council and Mayor of Nelson.
