= Hinton St George =

Village and civil parish in Somerset, England

Coordinates: 50.9090°N 2.8191°W

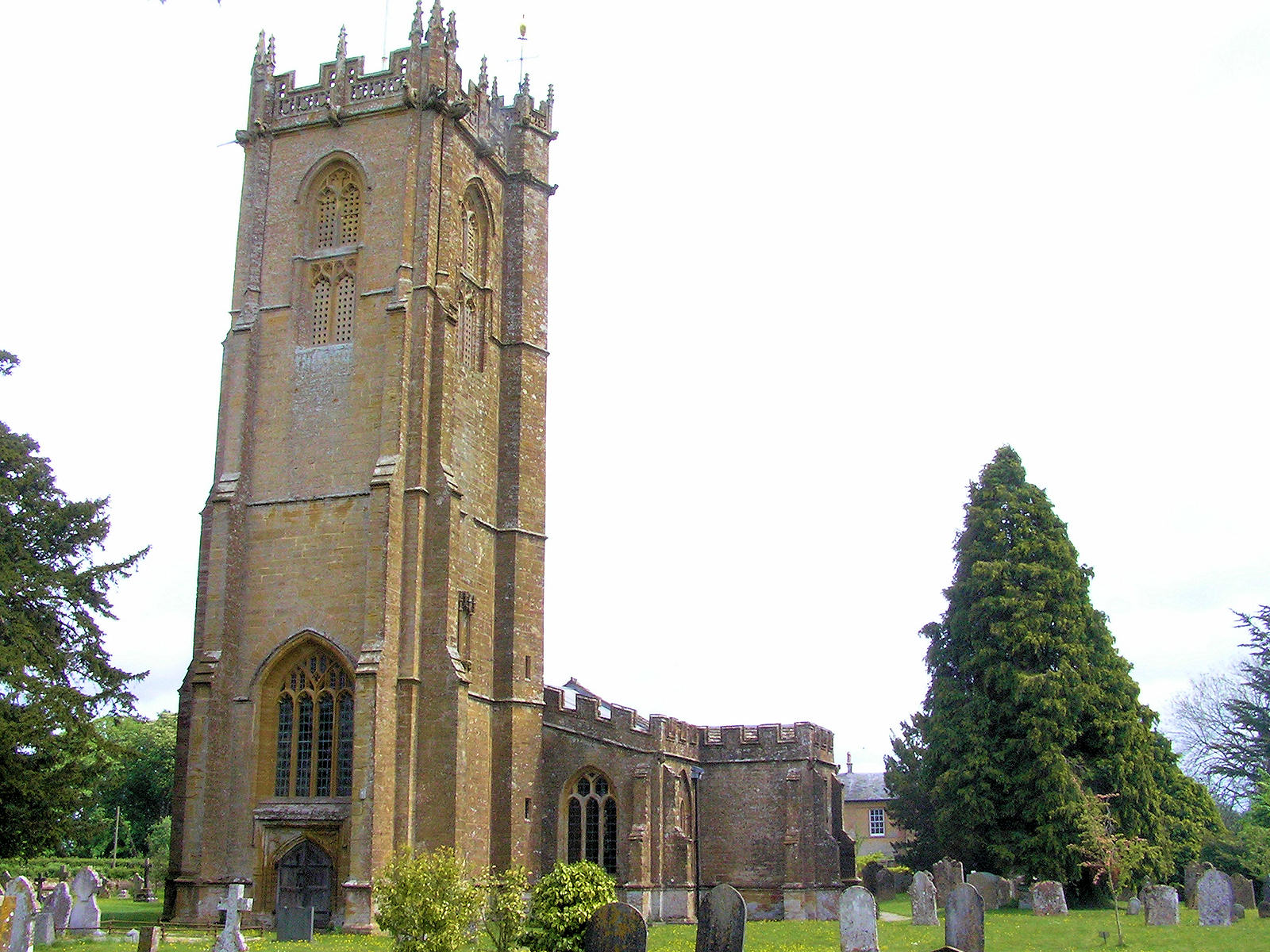
- Church of St George

- Location within Somerset
- Population: 442 (2011)
- OS grid reference: ST425125
- Civil parish: Hinton St George
- Unitary authority: Somerset Council
- Ceremonial county: Somerset
- Region: South West
- Country: England
- Sovereign state: United Kingdom
- Post town: HINTON ST. GEORGE
- Postcode district: TA17
- Dialling code: 01460
- Police: Avon and Somerset
- Fire: Devon and Somerset
- Ambulance: South Western
- UK Parliament: Yeovil
- Website: hintonstgeorge.org.uk

Hinton St George is a village and parish in Somerset, England, situated 3 miles (4.8 km) outside Crewkerne, 10 miles (16.1 km) south west of Yeovil. The village has a population of 442.

It has a wide main street lined with hamstone cottages, some thatched. The village has a thriving shop. The village does not lie on a major road, and has a few holiday cottages and second homes.

== History ==
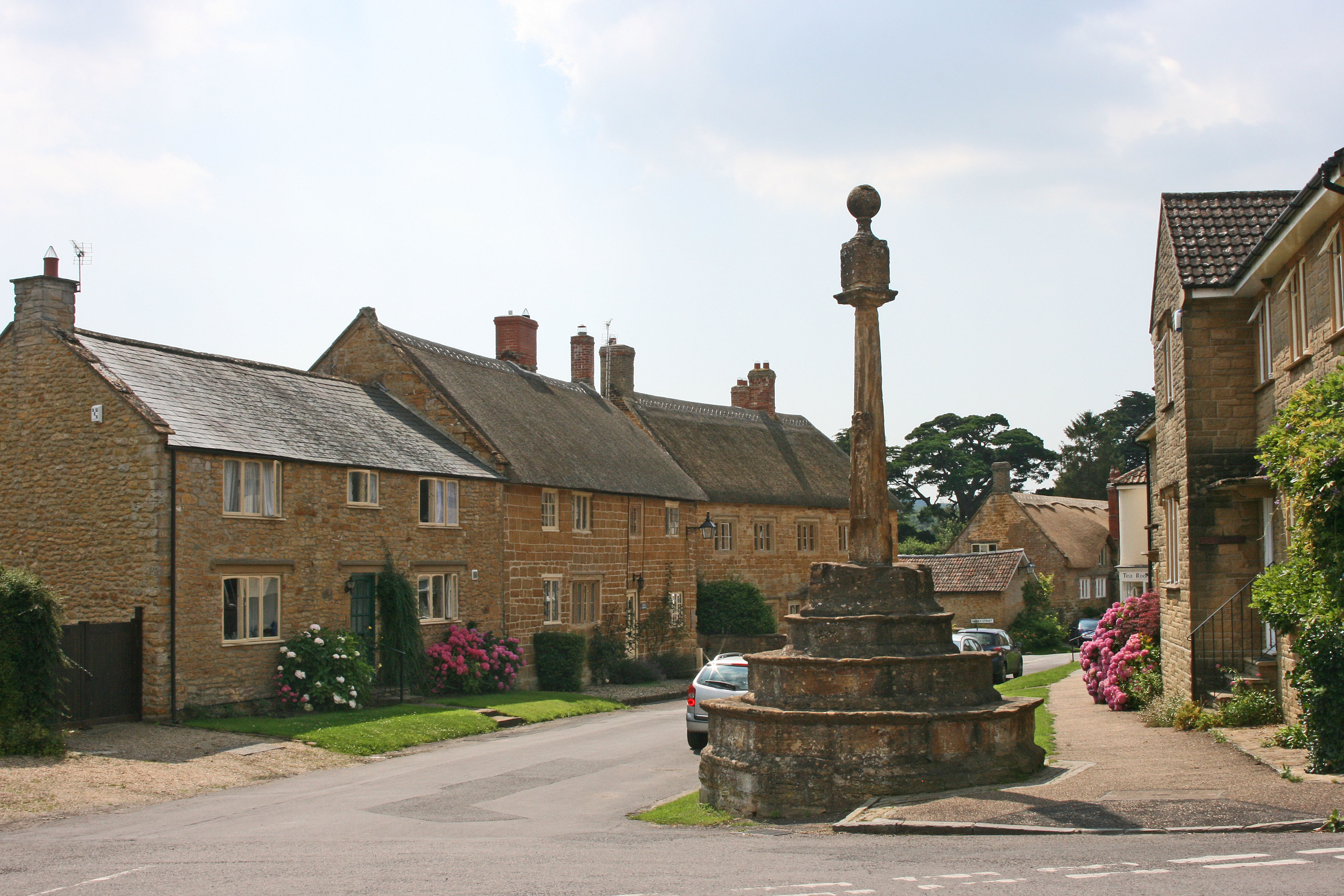
The village cross

The parish was part of the hundred of Crewkerne.

Much of the development of the village occurred under the lords Poulett extending their large house and estate (Hinton House). By the 1560s the three open arable fields had been enclosed and two large estates of 74 and 68 acres (280,000 m^{2}) created, based on the now disappeared hamlet of Craft. The park contained deer and orchards, with cherry trees

The village cross is an 8 feet 2 inches (2.49 m) high cross with a tapering octagonal shaft on stepped octagonal base. It is a scheduled monument and Grade II* listed building.

== Governance ==
The parish council has responsibility for local issues, including setting an annual precept (local rate) to cover the council's operating costs and producing annual accounts for public scrutiny. The parish council evaluates local planning applications and works with the local police, district council officers, and neighbourhood watch groups on matters of crime, security, and traffic. The parish council's role also includes initiating projects for the maintenance and repair of parish facilities, as well as consulting with the district council on the maintenance, repair, and improvement of highways, drainage, footpaths, public transport, and street cleaning. Conservation matters (including trees and listed buildings) and environmental issues are also the responsibility of the council.

For local government purposes, since 1 April 2023, the parish comes under the unitary authority of Somerset Council. Prior to this, it was part of the non-metropolitan district of South Somerset (established under the Local Government Act 1972). It was part of Chard Rural District before 1974.

It is also part of the Yeovil county constituency represented in the House of Commons of the Parliament of the United Kingdom. It elects one Member of Parliament (MP) by the first past the post system of election.

== Church ==
In Hinton St George is the Church of St George. It includes 13th century work by masons of Wells Cathedral. The vestry and north chapel of 1814 are said to be by James Wyatt, however it is more likely to be by Jeffry Wyatt, (later Sir Jeffry Wyattville). The four-stage tower is dated to 1485–95. It is supported by full-height offset corner buttresses, and has battlemented parapets with quatrefoil panels below merlons on the corner and intermediate pinnacles. The weathervane was added in 1756 by Thomas Bagley of Bridgwater. There is a hexagonal south-east corner stair turret. Stage 2 has small light on the north side and a statue niche on the south. All the faces on the two upper stages 2-light mullioned, transomed and traceried window under pointed arched labels, with pierced stone baffles. The clockface is under the east window. During restoration work the parapet of the tower was examined and a stone was discovered with a carved date of 1731 which suggests that the decorative parapet may have been added then. The tracery on the north side has been marked out but never cut. In general there is little sign of more than one phase of construction although repairs are evident.

== Almshouses ==
The Almshouses on Gas Lane were founded in 1872 by Lady Augusta Poulett, youngest daughter of the 4th Earl Poulett. She died in 1888, bequeathing funds to support the residents.

== Culture ==
- Punkie Night is celebrated in the village each October.

== See also ==
- Hinton (place name)
