= List of civil parishes in Somerset =

Districts of Somerset
All unitary authorities
1 Somerset
2 North Somerset
3 Bath and North East Somerset

The ceremonial county of Somerset is divided into 417 areas known as civil parishes, which are lowest unit of local government in England. Parishes arose from Church of England divisions, and were given their current powers and responsibilities by the Local Government Act 1894. The Local Government Act 1972 retained civil parishes in rural areas. Many former urban districts and municipal boroughs were replaced by new successor parishes; urban areas that were considered too large to be single parishes became unparished areas.

The ceremonial county of Somerset is currently governed by three unitary authorities: Bath and North East Somerset Council (B&NES), North Somerset Council, and Somerset Council.

Modern local government in Somerset began in 1889, when an administrative county was created and Somerset County Council was established; Bath was administered separately as a county borough.

In 1974, the county and council were abolished and replaced by two two-tier non-metropolitan counties, Somerset and Avon. Somerset was governed by a reconstituted county council and five districts: Mendip, Sedgemoor, South Somerset, Taunton Deane and West Somerset. Taunton Deane was granted borough status that same year. Avon consisted of six districts, of which three were created from areas formerly part of Somerset: Woodspring, Wansdyke, and Bath.

In 1996, Avon was abolished and its districts were renamed and reorganised into unitary authorities. Woodspring was renamed 'North Somerset' and Wansdyke and Bath were abolished and a new district covering the same area created, named 'Bath and North East Somerset'. In 1997 the two districts and non-metropolitan county became part of the new ceremonial county of Somerset. On 1 September 2019 the non-metropolitan districts of West Somerset and Taunton Deane merged, with the new district being called Somerset West and Taunton.

In 2023, the non-metropolitan county was reorganised by abolishing the four districts and their councils and reconstituting Somerset County Council as a unitary authority for the non-metropolitan county, with the powers of both a district and county council, renamed Somerset Council. The two existing unitary authorities were not altered.

The city of Bath is the largest centre of population in Bath and North East Somerset. Areas of the city that were formerly within the Bath County Borough are now unparished, but the rest of the authority is divided into 49 parishes. All of North Somerset, the other unitary authority, is covered by its 39 parishes ranging from the village Loxton with a population of 192, to the town of Weston-super-Mare with 76,143 inhabitants.

In the Somerset unitary authority area, the largest settlement is Taunton, with a population of 60,479. All the district is parished.

== History ==
Parishes arose from Church of England divisions, and were originally purely ecclesiastical divisions. Over time they acquired civil administration powers. The Highways Act 1555 made parishes responsible for the upkeep of roads. Every adult inhabitant of the parish was obliged to work four days a year on the roads, providing their own tools, carts and horses; the work was overseen by an unpaid local appointee, the Surveyor of Highways. The poor were looked after by the monasteries, until their dissolution. In 1572, magistrates were given power to 'survey the poor' and impose taxes for their relief. This system was made more formal by the Poor Law Act 1601, which made parishes responsible for administering the Poor Law; overseers were appointed to charge a rate to support the poor of the parish. The 19th century saw an increase in the responsibility of parishes, although the Poor Law powers were transferred to Poor Law Unions. The Public Health Act 1872 grouped parishes into Rural Sanitary Districts, based on the Poor Law Unions; these subsequently formed the basis for Rural Districts. Parishes were run by vestries, meeting annually to appoint officials, and were generally identical to ecclesiastical parishes, although some townships in large parishes administered the Poor Law themselves; under the Parishes Act 1882, all extra-parochial areas and townships that levied a separate rate became independent civil parishes.

Civil parishes in their modern sense date from the Local Government Act 1894, which abolished vestries; established elected parish councils in all rural parishes with more than 300 electors; grouped rural parishes into Rural Districts; and aligned parish boundaries with county and borough boundaries. Urban civil parishes continued to exist, and were generally coterminous with the Urban District, Municipal Borough or County Borough in which they were situated; many large towns contained a number of parishes, and these were usually merged into one. Parish councils were not formed in urban areas, and the only function of the parish was to elect guardians to Poor Law Unions; with the abolition of the Poor Law system in 1930 the parishes had only a nominal existence. The Local Government Act 1972 retained civil parishes in rural areas, and many former Urban Districts and Municipal Boroughs that were being abolished, were replaced by new successor parishes; urban areas that were considered too large to be single parishes became unparished areas.

== Current position ==
Map showing the boundaries of the present-day civil parishes of Somerset

Recent governments have encouraged the formation of town and parish councils in unparished areas, and the Local Government and Rating Act 1997 gave local residents the right to demand the creation of a new civil parish. A parish council can become a town council unilaterally, simply by resolution; and a civil parish can also gain city status, but only if that is granted by the Crown. The chairman of a town or city council is called a mayor. There are currently 28 civil parishes in the county with the status of a town, and one (Wells) with city status. The Local Government and Public Involvement in Health Act 2007 introduced alternative names: a parish council can now choose to be called a community; village; or neighbourhood council.

== Bath and North East Somerset ==
The area of the city of Bath which was part of Bath County Borough is unparished.

Image	Name	Status	Population ^{date needed}	Former local authority	Coordinates	Refs
Yellow stone building, with porch with triangular roof in front. Short square tower with battlements topped by flag and flag pole. Gray gravestones in the foreground	Bathampton	Civil parish	1,603	Bathavon Rural District	51.39°N 2.32°W	
White fronted buildings with windows with small panes of glass. Shop signs for fish and chips and a pub. Postbox on the pavement in front of the buildings separated by black railings.	Batheaston	Civil parish	2,735	Bathavon Rural District	51.41°N 2.31°W	
Street scene with yellow stone houses on the left and trees showing above a wall on the right	Bathford	Civil parish	1,759	Bathavon Rural District	51.39°N 2.30°W	
Square grey tower of stone church building, partially obscured by trees. Red roofed lych gate to right. Grass and gravestones in the foreground	Camerton	Civil parish	655	Bathavon Rural District	51.32°N 2.45°W	
Gray building with tower at the near end. Trees to right. Gravestones in front	Charlcombe	Civil parish	422	Bathavon Rural District	51.41°N 2.36°W	
Gray stone building. Prominent square tower with arched window, topped by small slate pyramidal roof. Left and right of the building are yew trees amongst gravestones.	Chelwood	Civil parish	148	Clutton Rural District	51.35°N 2.52°W	
Street scene showing road junction and grey stone buildings with parked cars in front of them. To the left is a grassy area with a tree.	Chew Magna	Civil parish	1,149	Clutton Rural District	51.37°N 2.61°W	
multiple buildings with red and grey roofs nestled amongst trees. Church tower to the left. Foreground is grassy fields and hedgerows. Background is hills.	Chew Stoke	Civil parish	991	Clutton Rural District	51.35°N 2.64°W	
Gray stone building with slate roof. Attached to the right is a wooden structure over water, partially obscured by trees	Claverton	Civil parish	115	Bathavon Rural District	51.38°N 2.31°W	
Stone building, partially obscured by trees. Red brick tower with horizontal stripe pattern surmounted by battlements.	Clutton	Civil parish	1,602	Clutton Rural District	51.33°N 2.54°W	
Semicircular stone steps, partially obscured by trees. Water to the left	Combe Hay	Civil parish	147	Bathavon Rural District	51.34°N 2.38°W	
Gray stone building with arched windows. Square tower topped with spirelet, flagpole and weather vane. Foreground has small trees and bushes and a wooden rail fence.	Compton Dando	Civil parish	579	Keynsham Urban District	51.38°N 2.51°W	
In the foreground are a stone wall and road. Beyond is an area of water surrounded by trees and white fronted houses.	Compton Martin	Civil parish	508	Clutton Rural District	51.31°N 2.65°W	
Gray stone building with small square tower and pyramidal roof. Grassy foreground with a cross and gravestones	Corston	Civil parish	494	Bathavon Rural District	51.39°N 2.44°W	
White caravan on grassy bridge, surrounded by small trees and shrubs	Dunkerton and Tunley	Civil parish	502	Bathavon Rural District	51.33°N 2.41°W	
Red and grey stone building with arched windows and triangular roof. Behind is a small square tower	East Harptree	Civil parish	644	Clutton Rural District	51.30°N 2.62°W	
Roofs of houses visible amongst green fields and hedgerows. Large rock in the foreground.	Englishcombe	Civil parish	318	Bathavon Rural District	51.36°N 2.41°W	
Gray stone building with square tower at left hand end. Grass and gravestones in the foreground.	Farmborough	Civil parish	1,035	Clutton Rural District	51.34°N 2.48°W	
Gray stone building with square tower at far end. Grass and gravestones in the foreground.	Farrington Gurney	Civil parish	901	Clutton Rural District	51.29°N 2.53°W	
Yellow stone building with grey slate roof and grey chimney, surrounding by houses and trees. In the foreground is a path with a high stone wall and vegetation.	Freshford	Civil parish	551	Bathavon Rural District	51.34°N 2.31°W	
Grey stone building on 3 bays with a square stone tower at near end of central bay. To the left is a porch with slate roof. In front is a yew tree and gravestones behind a stone wall separating it from a road.	High Littleton	Civil parish	2,104	Clutton Rural District	51.32°N 2.51°W	
Church tower seen arising behind stone buildings with tile roofs, one of which has a pub sign. Foreground is grass	Hinton Blewett	Civil parish	308	Clutton Rural District	51.31°N 2.58°W	
Gray stone building with small square tower at left hand end. In the foreground is grass with a small tiled memorial.	Hinton Charterhouse	Civil parish	515	Bathavon Rural District	51.33°N 2.32°W	
Stone building with tower to right hand side. In front is a wall separating the building from the road.	Kelston	Civil Parish	248	Bathavon Rural District	51.40°N 2.43°W	
Street scene showing shops on left and right, with cars and vans on road. On the left hand pavement is a sign saying welcome to Keynsham high street.	Keynsham	Town	15,641	Keynsham Urban District	51.41°N 2.49°W	
Top of ower with spirelets seen behind trees. In the foreground is grass and gravestones	Marksbury	Civil parish	397	Bathavon Rural District	51.36°N 2.48°W	
A river running between pavements with railings. Shops behind	Midsomer Norton	Town	10,997	Norton Radstock	51.28°N 2.48°W	
The roofs of houses and farm buildings in a green valley. Trees in the foreground	Monkton Combe	Civil parish	554	Bathavon Rural District	51.36°N 2.33°W	
Gray stone building with tower at right hand end surmounted by a small spirelet, partially obscured by trees.	Nempnett Thrubwell	Civil parish	177	Clutton Rural District	51.34°N 2.68°W	
Reddish brown building with tower nearest the camera. Trees to left and right	Newton St Loe	Civil parish	681	Bathavon Rural District	51.38°N 2.43°W	
The roofs of a row of houses amongst green fields.	Norton Malreward	Civil parish	246	Clutton Rural District	51.39°N 2.57°W	
Large conical black mound with trees in the foreground	Paulton	Civil parish	5,302	Clutton Rural District	51.31°N 2.50°W	
Gray stone building on the left with a pub sign outside it. A road is central to the picture with a white coloured building on the right.	Peasedown St John	Civil parish	6,446	Bathavon Rural District	51.32°N 2.44°W	
Gray building with arched windows. Square tower surmounted by a weather vane. Gravestones and crosses in grass in the foreground separated from the road by a stone wall.	Priston	Civil parish	232	Bathavon Rural District	51.34°N 2.44°W	
Gray stone bridge with two arches over water. The central pillar is on a small island. Trees to the left and right and behind the bridge.	Publow	Civil parish	1,119	Clutton Rural District	51.37°N 2.55°W	
Large wheel on brick tower.	Radstock	Town	5,620	Norton Radstock Town Council	51.29°N 2.4477°W	
Gray stone building with red tiled roof, partially obscured by a hedge. A square tower is at the far end. The foreground includes several crosses and gravestones.	Saltford	Civil parish	4,073	Keynsham Urban District	51.40°N 2.46°W	
Several houses, many with white walls and red roofs nestling in a green valley with occasional trees.	Shoscombe	Civil parish	443	Bathavon Rural District	51.30°N 2.41°W	
Gray stone building with prominent four stage tower at the right hand end. To the left is a large yew tree.	Southstoke	Civil parish	460	Bathavon Rural District	51.35°N 2.36°W	
Gray stone building with square tower behind. In the foreground are green fields and bushes.	Stanton Drew	Civil parish	787	Clutton Rural District	51.37°N 2.58°W	
The roofs of many houses can be seen in a green valley with several trees.	Stowey-Sutton	Civil parish	1,361	Clutton Rural District	51.34°N 2.59°W	
The roofs of several houses can be seen nestling in a green valley with lots of trees.	Swainswick	Civil parish	265	Bathavon Rural District	51.41°N 2.35°W	
Side of stone building with arched windows, partially obscured by trees. Gravestones in the foreground	Temple Cloud with Cameley	Civil parish	1,292	Clutton Rural District	51.32°N 2.56°W	
Gray three bay building with arched windows. Tower behind and gravestones in the foreground.	Timsbury	Civil parish	2,624	Clutton Rural District	51.33°N 2.48°W	
Gray stone building with square tower surmounted by a spire on the left. Surrounded by trees and green fields.	Ubley	Civil parish	331	Clutton Rural District	51.32°N 2.68°W	
The roofs of many houses, and a church spire can be seen in a green valley with several trees.	Wellow	Civil parish	529	Bathavon Rural District	51.32°N 2.37°W	
	Westfield	Civil parish	5,854	Norton Radstock Town Council	51.29°N 2.448°W	
Street scene with a church and spire central to the picture. To the right is a yellow building with a pub sign. To the left is a large tree with a signpost in front. Several cars.	West Harptree	Civil parish	439	Clutton Rural District	51.31°N 2.63°W	
Gray stone building with arched windows. A central tower has a clock on the near face and is surmounted by a weather vane.	Whitchurch	Civil parish	1,354	Bathavon Rural District	51.41°N 2.56°W	

== North Somerset ==
The whole of the district is parished.

Image	Name	Status	Population	Former local authority	Coordinates	Refs
Stone building with prominent three stage square tower. In the foreground is a grass area and road separated from the church by a stone wall.	Abbots Leigh	Civil parish	799	Long Ashton Rural District	51.46°N 2.65°W	
Road signs with Backwell in black writing on white background and below it another sign saying village of the year South West and Wales regional winner 1997.	Backwell	Civil parish	4,589	Long Ashton Rural District	51.41°N 2.73°W	
Stone building with slit windows and battlements. Foreground is road with grass verges.	Banwell	Civil parish	2,919	Axbridge Rural District	51.32°N 2.86°W	
Water contained within stone walls to the right of road. In the background stone house with red roof.	Barrow Gurney	Civil parish	349	Long Ashton Rural District	51.40°N 2.67°W	
Church tower surrounded by trees with water in the background.	Blagdon	Civil parish	1,116	Axbridge Rural District	51.33°N 2.72°W	
Square three stage stone tower. To the right is a building with a white wall and in the foreground a parked car.	Bleadon	Civil parish	1,079	Axbridge Rural District	51.31°N 2.94°W	
Brown field being ploughed by multiple red tractors. In the background it a hill with trees.	Brockley	Civil parish	277	Long Ashton Rural District	51.39°N 2.76°W	
Stone building with arched windows and a square tower.	Burrington	Civil parish	464	Axbridge Rural District	51.33°N 2.74°W	
Stone building with arched windows and a square tower.	Butcombe	Civil parish	218	Axbridge Rural District	51.35°N 2.69°W	
Multiple houses mostly with red roofs seen in a valley between the vegetation in the foreground and the hills beyond.	Churchill	Civil parish	2,235	Axbridge Rural District	51.33°N 2.79°W	
Red brick building with tall chimneys. In the foreground is an arched gateway.	Clapton in Gordano	Civil parish	348	Long Ashton Rural District	51.46°N 2.75°W	
Stone building with arched windows and central square tower.In the foreground are trees and a road.	Cleeve	Civil parish	902	Long Ashton Rural District	51.39°N 2.77°W	
Metal pier standing on thin legs rising from the sea. Beach in the foreground	Clevedon	Town	21,281	Clevedon Urban District	51.43°N 2.85°W	
Roofs of houses showing amongst tree with prominent church tower. In the foreground are green fields with hills behind.	Congresbury	Civil parish	3,497	Axbridge Rural District	51.37°N 2.81°W	
Yellow stone church tower above other buildings of the same stone.In the foreground is a grassy field with cows.	Dundry	Civil parish	829	Long Ashton Rural District	51.39°N 2.64°W	
Three stage square stone church tower on the left. Red painted building on the right and a rainbow.	Flax Bourton	Civil parish	715	Long Ashton Rural District	51.42°N 2.71°W	
Stone cross, with red wreaths, separated from a building behind by metal railings.	Hutton	Civil parish	2,582	Axbridge Rural District	51.32°N 2.93°W	
Stone church with square tower in the background partially obscured by trees. To the left is a pink painted house with red roof and in the foreground a car and grass area.	Kenn	Civil parish	431	Long Ashton Rural District	51.42°N 2.84°W	
Square stone tower and red roofed buildings behind a stone wall and partially obscured by trees.	Kewstoke	Civil parish	1,690	Axbridge Rural District	51.37°N 2.96°W	
Street scene with area between two roads containing trees and stone column behind a white fence.	Kingston Seymour	Civil parish	388	Long Ashton Rural District	51.39°N 2.86°W	
	Locking	Civil parish	2,756	Axbridge Rural District	51.33°N 2.91°W	
Yellow painted building fronting the road is nearest the camera. In the background is the square stone tower.	Long Ashton	Civil parish	6,044	Long Ashton Rural District	51.43°N 2.65°W	
The houses and church of a small village can be seen in the bottom left of the picture. It is surrounded by a patchwork of fields with some trees on a hillside. Large hills in the distance.	Loxton	Civil parish	192	Axbridge Rural District	51.29°N 2.89°W	
lots of house roofs, with trees and grass in the foreground and hills in the distance.	Nailsea	Town	15,630	Long Ashton Rural District	51.43°N 2.76°W	
Street sign with the words Welcome to Easton in Gordano & Pill.	Pill and Easton-in-Gordano (until 2011 Easton in Gordano)	Civil parish	4,828	Long Ashton Rural District	51.48°N 2.69°W	
Square stone tower behind churchyard with cross and gravestones.	Portbury	Civil parish	827	Long Ashton Rural District	51.47°N 2.72°W	
Multiple buildings including terraces, detached houses and blocks of flats. In the foreground are fields and in the background water and then hills.	Portishead	Town	23,699	Long Ashton Rural District; Portishead Urban District	51.48°N 2.77°W	
Low building with tiled roof and non-vertical square tower, surrounded by trees and with grass in the foreground.	Puxton	Civil parish	359	Axbridge Rural District	51.37°N 2.85°W	
White fronted shop with sign saying St Georges News	St Georges	Civil parish	3,379	Axbridge Rural District	51.36°N 2.90°W	
Stone church view from a low angle. The church has a simple tower and there are gravestones in the churchyard surrounding it	Tickenham	Civil parish	910	Long Ashton Rural District	51.44°N 2.80°W	
The markings on a road junction around a tree are visible in the foreground, in front of a small shop with Christmas decorations in the window. A red K8 model telephone box and a red post box built into a wall are to the left.	Walton in Gordano	Civil parish	273	Axbridge Rural District	51.45°N 2.83°W	
Stone building with arched windows and square tower. In the foreground is a grass area with gravestones.	Weston in Gordano	Civil parish	301	Axbridge Rural District	51.46°N 2.79°W	
Multiple houses and other buildings around a bay into which a pier projects. On the background are hills.	Weston super Mare	Town	76,143	Axbridge Rural District; Weston super Mare Municipal Borough	51.35°N 2.97°W	
Stone steps up to a stone shaft which would once have had a cross at the top. To the left are yellow painted houses. To the right is an old stone church with a square tower partially obscured by trees.	Wick St Lawrence	Civil parish	1,331	Axbridge Rural District	51.38°N 2.91°W	
Stone building with tiled roof. Sign saying Prince of Waterloo. In the foreground are tables, benches and planters.	Winford	Civil parish	2,153	Long Ashton Rural District	51.38°N 2.66°W	
Street scene with houses and shops on both side of road on which there is a tractor.	Winscombe and Sandford	Civil parish	4,546	Axbridge Rural District	51.31°N 2.83°W	
Stone building with square tower. In the foreground are gravestones.	Wraxall and Failand	Civil parish	2,302	Long Ashton Rural District	51.44°N 2.73°W	
Street scene showing shops and houses with cars.	Wrington	Civil parish	2,633	Axbridge Rural District	51.36°N 2.76°W	
Row of shops in pedestrianised precinct. In the foreground a bus shelter and tree.	Yatton	Civil parish	7,552	Long Ashton Rural District	51.39°N 2.83°W	

== Somerset (district) ==
The whole of the district is parished.

Image	Name	Status	Population	Local authority pre-1974	District 1974-2023	Coordinates	Refs
Gray stone building with square tower at left hand end. Foreground includes grass area with gravestones, taken over the top of metal railings.	Ashwick	Civil parish	1,352	Shepton Mallet Rural District	Mendip	51.23°N 2.52°W	
Brown stone building with square tower at the left hand end. In the foreground is a grass area with gravestones.	Baltonsborough	Civil parish	864	Wells Rural District	Mendip	51.11°N 2.64°W	
A row of whitewashed buildings on the left with climbing plants. Small flower filled gardens separate them from a stone wall fronting a road.	Batcombe	Civil parish	439	Shepton Mallet Rural District	Mendip	51.15°N 2.44°W	
Street scene showing brown stone houses with tiled roofs. Several parked cars in the road.	Beckington	Civil parish	983	Frome Rural District	Mendip	51.26°N 2.28°W	
Yellow stone building with prominent square tower. Trees to left and right of the path leading to the building.	Berkley	Civil parish	344	Frome Rural District	Mendip	51.24°N 2.27°W	
Stone three stage square tower surmounted by a flag pole. To the right are trees and in the foreground grass.	Binegar	Civil parish	313	Shepton Mallet Rural District	Mendip	51.24°N 2.55°W	
Street scene showing grey stone houses on the left of a road with a few cars.	Buckland Dinham	Civil parish	381	Frome Rural District	Mendip	51.26°N 2.35°W	
Grassy area with trees in the foreground and a terrace of stone houses, one white fronted, in the background	Butleigh	Civil parish	823	Wells Rural District	Mendip	51.09°N 2.68°W	
Stone two bay building with prominent ornamental tower behind	Chewton Mendip	Civil parish	585	Wells Rural District	Mendip	51.28°N 2.58°W	
Street scene with stone cross on three tier plinth to the left of the road. In the background is a white walled building.	Chilcompton	Civil parish	2,062	Clutton Rural District	Mendip	51.27°N 2.50°W	
Stone building with prominent square tower at near end. In the foreground are gravestones and trees to the left and right.	Coleford	Civil parish	2,313	Frome Rural District	Mendip	51.24°N 2.45°W	
Stone building with arched porchway. Prominent square tower to the left hand end of building. In the foreground gravestones and crosses on grass.	Cranmore	Civil parish	667	Shepton Mallet Rural District	Mendip	51.19°N 2.48°W	
Water flowing through a channel and over a weir between a building and a wall. Vegetation on both sides of the water.	Croscombe	Civil parish	603	Shepton Mallet Rural District	Mendip	51.20°N 2.58°W	
Yellow stone building with central square tower, Foreground is paths through green grass.	Ditcheat	Civil parish	725	Shepton Mallet Rural District	Mendip	51.13°N 2.54°W	
	Downhead	Civil parish	88	Shepton Mallet Rural District	Mendip	51.211°N 2.443°W	
Gray stone building with two arched porch entrance doors. Separated from road by stone wall.	Doulting	Civil parish	618	Shepton Mallet Rural District	Mendip	51.19°N 2.51°W	
Stone building with square tower to left hand end. Foreground shows gravestones in grass area.	East Pennard	Civil parish	348	Shepton Mallet Rural District	Mendip	51.14°N 2.62°W	
Whitewashed building with square tower.	Emborough	Civil parish	148	Shepton Mallet Rural District	Mendip	51.26°N 2.55°W	
Street scene. Stone cross on a pillar rising from 5 step plinth. Iron lampost left and right of the road are stone terraced houses.	Evercreech	Civil parish	2,334	Shepton Mallet Rural District	Mendip	51.14°N 2.51°W	
Street scene. Buildings to left and right of narrow road.	Frome	Town	26,203	Frome Rural District; Frome Urban District	Mendip	51.23°N 2.32°W	
Red roofs of multiple houses, with some larger white roofs at the far side. Surrounded by trees and grren fields on all sides. Hills on the horizon.	Glastonbury	Town	8,932	Glastonbury Municipal Borough	Mendip	51.15°N 2.71°W	
Stone building at the end of narrow lane with water filled ditches on either side. Surrounded by fields and trees.	Godney	Civil parish	237	Wells Rural District	Mendip	51.18°N 2.74°W	
Stone two arch bridge over water	Great Elm	Civil parish	171	Frome Rural District	Mendip	51.24°N 2.36°W	
Stone building with arched windows. Prominent square tower to the right hand end. In the foreground are gravestones in grassy area.	Hemington	Civil parish	640	Frome Rural District	Mendip	51.28°N 2.39°W	
Street scene. Road junction with red stop sign. Two cars. The sides of the roads are stone walls with large trees showing above them.	Holcombe	Civil parish	947	Shepton Mallet Rural District	Mendip	51.24°N 2.46°W	
Stone building with old metal sign above the door saying Old Post Office, red post box set into the wall and to the left an old blue telephone box. The door is below the level of the road and separated by metal railings. Hanging baskets of flowers on the front of the building.	Kilmersdon	Civil parish	541	Frome Rural District	Mendip	51.27°N 2.44°W	
Gray stone building with square tower at left hand end. In the foreground are gravestones on grass.	Lamyatt	Civil parish	183	Shepton Mallet Rural District	Mendip	51.12°N 2.49°W	
Street scene showing a road unction with parked cars. On the left and right are stone houses with trees and fields in the distance.	Leigh-on-Mendip	Civil parish	514	Frome Rural District	Mendip	51.23°N 2.44°W	
Stone building with square tower at left hand end. In the foreground are trees and gravestones.	Litton	Civil parish	240	Clutton Rural District	Mendip	51.29°N 2.58°W	
Cast iron pump with its own tiled roof. Behind are two stone built thatched cottages.	Lullington	Civil parish	162	Frome Rural District	Mendip	51.26°N 2.31°W	
Small shop with white surrounds to the windows set in the right hand building of a terrace.	Lydford-on-Fosse	Civil parish	511	Shepton Mallet Rural District	Mendip	51.07°N 2.62°W	
Yellow stone building with tiled roof and arched doorway.	Meare	Civil parish	1,304	Wells Rural District	Mendip	51.17°N 2.77°W	
Street of grey stone houses. The church tower can be seen n the background	Mells	Civil parish	638	Frome Rural District	Mendip	51.24°N 2.39°W	
Stone church tower with flag pole. In the foreground are gravestones on grass.	North Wootton	Civil parish	317	Wells Rural District	Mendip	51.17°N 2.62°W	
White fronted building with black beams prominent. Over the door is a sign saying The George Inn, Wadworths.	Norton St Philip	Civil Parish	858	Frome Rural District	Mendip	51.29°N 2.32°W	
Ruined stone castle with round towers at each corner.	Nunney	Civil parish	844	Frome Rural District	Mendip	51.21°N 2.38°W	
Long stone building with buttressed walls and red tiled roof.	Pilton	Civil parish	998	Shepton Mallet Rural District	Mendip	51.17°N 2.59°W	
Large area of green grass with stone farm buildings behind. In the centre is a small thatched wooden building.	Priddy	Civil parish	624	Wells Rural District	Mendip	51.25°N 2.68°W	
Stone building with prominent square tower. Surrounded by trees and with green grass area in the foreground separated from the building by a stone wall.	Pylle	Civil parish	160	Shepton Mallet Rural District	Mendip	51.14°N 2.56°W	
Street scene. Triangular area of grass with village sign on wooden post and stone cross behind. Stone houses with tiled roofs n the background.	Rode	Civil parish	1,025	Frome Rural District	Mendip	51.28°N 2.2°W	
Stone building with square three stage tower at the left hand end. Trees to the right hand gravestones in front.	Rodney Stoke	Civil parish	1,326	Wells Rural District	Mendip	51.25°N 2.74°W	
–	Selwood	Civil parish	798	Frome Rural District	Mendip	51.24°N 2.31°W	
Stone buildings seen behind trees and grass area with wooden fence in the foreground.	Sharpham	Civil parish	130	Wells Rural District	Mendip	51.14°N 2.77°W	
Street scene with buildings on the left and right. In a central position is a stone arched building with a spire.	Shepton Mallet	Town	10,369	Shepton Mallet Urban District	Mendip	51.19°N 2.55°W	
Stone building with square tower	St Cuthbert Out	Civil parish	3,749	Wells Rural District	Mendip	51.18°N 2.69°W	
Gray bstone building with square tower to the left hand end, partially obscured by tree. In the foreground is a stone wall separating the church from the road.	Stoke St Michael	Civil parish	926	Shepton Mallet Rural District	Mendip	51.22°N 2.48°W	
Stone building with square tower. Foreground is grass with gravestones.	Ston Easton	Civil parish	550	Clutton Rural District	Mendip	51.28°N 2.54°W	
Gray stone building with square tower. Foreground is grass with gravestones.	Stratton on the Fosse	Civil parish	1,108	Shepton Mallet Rural District	Mendip	51.25°N 2.49°W	
Paved shopping street with shops on either side. Green bollards	Street	Civil parish	11,805	Street Urban District	Mendip	51.12°N 2.74°W	
Stone arched bridge with wooden handrail over river.	Tellisford	Civil parish	182	Frome Rural District	Mendip	51.29°N 2.28°W	
Street scene. Red telephone box and telegraph pole. Stone buildings around road junction.	Trudoxhill	Civil parish	423	Frome Rural District	Mendip	51.19°N 2.37°W	
Stone building with tower beyond field and stone wall.	Upton Noble	Civil parish	128	Frome Rural District	Mendip	51.15°N 2.41°W	
White circular building with three windows, surrounded by vegetation.	Walton	Civil parish	1,106	Wells Rural District	Mendip	51.14°N 2.77°W	
Street scene. Houses to left and right of road junction.	Wanstrow	Civil parish	489	Frome Rural District	Mendip	51.17°N 2.41°W	
People at coloured market stalls. Surrounding are houses with the towers of the cathedral visible behind.	Wells	City	10,536	Wells Municipal Borough	Mendip	51.21°N 2.65°W	
Yellow stone building with red tiled roof and square tower with short spire. Foreground is grass with gravestones.	West Bradley	Civil parish	277	Shepton Mallet Rural District	Mendip	51.13°N 2.64°W	
Gray stone building with arched windows and square tower. Foreground is grass with gravestones.	West Pennard	Civil parish	670	Wells Rural District	Mendip	51.14°N 2.65°W	
Stone building with square tower partially obscured by tree.	Westbury	Civil parish	801	Wells Rural District	Mendip	51.24°N 2.71°W	
Stone building with archway through it for the road. Steps to wooden doorway on the first floor.	Whatley	Civil parish	245	Frome Rural District	Mendip	51.23°N 2.38°W	
A row of cottages, partially obscured by vegetation. In the background is the bell tower of a much large building.	Witham Friary	Civil parish	399	Frome Rural District	Mendip	51.17°N 2.37°W	
Two bay building with square tower with spirelet. In the foreground are gravestones in a grassy area.	Wookey	Civil parish	1,311	Wells Rural District	Mendip	51.21°N 2.69°W	
Street scene showing road junction with houses and cars	Ashcott	Civil parish	1,186	Bridgwater Rural District	Sedgemoor	51.12°N 2.81°W	
Street scene. On the left of the road is a half timbered house where the first and second storeys have irregular black wooden beams showing through white painted walls.	Axbridge	Town	2,057	Axbridge Rural District	Sedgemoor	51.29°N 2.82°W	
Stone building with square tower. In the foreground are gravestones.	Badgworth	Civil parish	525	Axbridge Rural District	Sedgemoor	51.27°N 2.87°W	
Brown stone building with red roofs and central square tower. In the foreground are gravestones.	Bawdrip	Civil parish	506	Bridgwater Rural District	Sedgemoor	51.15°N 2.94°W	
Wooden hulk of ship, surrounded by wet sand.	Berrow	Civil parish	1,534	Axbridge Rural District	Sedgemoor	51.27°N 3.01°W	
Small stone building with crosses on the roof.	Brean	Civil parish	635	Axbridge Rural District	Sedgemoor	51.30°N 3.01°W	
Red brick buildings in front of grey stone church. In the foreground in a grassy field contained within a hedge and fence.	Brent Knoll	Civil parish	1,271	Axbridge Rural District	Sedgemoor	51.25°N 2.95°W	
Statue of figure with outstretched arm. To the left a tall church spire and the right a circular building with columns.	Bridgwater	Town	35,886	Bridgwater Municipal Borough	Sedgemoor	51.13°N 2.99°W	
Large road w2ith houses to left and right and hills beyond.	Bridgwater Without	Civil parish	428	Bridgwater Rural District	Sedgemoor	51.14°N 2.97°W	
Stone building with prominent square tower.	Broomfield	Civil parish	249	Bridgwater Rural District	Sedgemoor	51.08°N 3.11°W	
Short pier above sand, surmounted by white pavilion with flag poles.	Burnham on Sea and Highbridge	Town	19,576	Burnham on Sea Urban District	Sedgemoor	51.24°N 2.99°W	
Small light coloured building behind a hedge and gate.	Burnham Without	Civil Parish	1,636	Axbridge Rural District	Sedgemoor	51.23°N 2.96°W	
Small stone building with arched doorway. The church is partially obscured by trees.	Burtle	Civil parish	388	Bridgwater Rural District	Sedgemoor	51.17°N 2.87°W	
Red stone church with square tower.	Cannington	Civil parish	2,271	Bridgwater Rural District	Sedgemoor	51.15°N 3.07°W	
View of the roofs of houses amongst trees and fields. Hills in the distance under a blue cloudless sky.	Catcott	Civil parish	531	Bridgwater Rural District	Sedgemoor	51.15°N 2.87°W	
White circular building with four black sails.	Chapel Allerton	Civil parish	401	Axbridge Rural District	Sedgemoor	51.25°N 2.85°W	
Roofs of multiple buildings separated by trees and vegetation. In the distance is a lake and hills.	Cheddar	Civil parish	5,755	Axbridge Rural District	Sedgemoor	51.28°N 2.78°W	
Stone building with square tower.	Chedzoy	Civil parish	404	Bridgwater Rural District	Sedgemoor	51.13°N 2.95°W	
Square stone tower, behind a stone wall and partially obscured by a tree.	Chilton Polden	Civil parish	698	Bridgwater Rural District	Sedgemoor	51.15°N 2.90°W	
Reddish stone building with square tower.	Chilton Trinity	Civil parish	260	Bridgwater Rural District	Sedgemoor	51.15°N 3.01°W	
Church building with square tower seen within green fields with trees and hills behind.	Compton Bishop	Civil parish	620	Axbridge Rural District	Sedgemoor	51.30°N 2.87°W	
Stone building with square tower at left hand end. In the foreground either side of a path are gravestones in a grassy area.	Cossington	Civil parish	564	Bridgwater Rural District	Sedgemoor	51.16°N 2.92°W	
Stone buildings with water in front.	Durleigh	Civil parish	548	Bridgwater Rural District	Sedgemoor	51.12°N 3.04°W	
Roofs of houses with prominent church spire to the right. Hills in the background.	East Brent	Civil parish	1,302	Axbridge Rural District	Sedgemoor	51.26°N 2.94°W	
Road junction with direction sign. In the background is a white painted building with a pub sign saying The Crown.	East Huntspill	Civil parish	1,146	Bridgwater Rural District	Sedgemoor	51.20°N 2.98°W	
Stone wall with arched gap, overgrown with weeds.	Edington	Civil parish	372	Bridgwater Rural District	Sedgemoor	51.15°N 2.88°W	
Square stone tower of church with residential buildings. In the foreground grass field contained by wooden fences.	Enmore	Civil parish	247	Bridgwater Rural District	Sedgemoor	51.11°N 3.09°W	
Stone building with lighter coloured square tower. In the foreground are gravestones.	Fiddington	Civil parish	298	Bridgwater Rural District	Sedgemoor	51.16°N 3.12°W	
Stone building with pillars, surrounded by grass.	Goathurst	Civil parish	193	Bridgwater Rural District	Sedgemoor	51.10°N 3.06°W	
Stone building with square tower, separated from the road in the foreground by a stone wall.	Greinton	Civil Parish	71	Bridgwater Rural District	Sedgemoor	51.12°N 2.84°W	
White building with grey roof in the middle of green grass area.	Lympsham	Civil parish	960	Axbridge Rural District	Sedgemoor	51.29°N 2.95°W	
Square church tower showing above tees and shrubs. In the foreground is a grass field with cattle.	Lyng	Civil parish	338	Bridgwater Rural District	Sedgemoor	51.05°N 2.96°W	
Stone building with prominent square tower. In the foreground are gravestones.	Mark	Civil parish	1,478	Axbridge Rural District	Sedgemoor	51.23°N 2.89°W	
Stone building with prominent square tower.	Middlezoy	Civil parish	725	Bridgwater Rural District	Sedgemoor	51.09°N 2.89°W	
Square stone tower surrounded by trees and grass.	Moorlinch	Civil parish	408	Bridgwater Rural District	Sedgemoor	51.13°N 2.86°W	
Stone building with prominent square tower. In the foreground are gravestones.	Nether Stowey	Civil parish	1,373	Bridgwater Rural District	Sedgemoor	51.15°N 3.15°W	
Stone building with prominent square tower.	North Petherton	Town	6,730	Bridgwater Rural District	Sedgemoor	51.09°N 3.01°W	
Stone building with square tower	Othery	Civil parish	642	Bridgwater Rural District	Sedgemoor	51.08°N 2.88°W	
Stone building with prominent square tower. In the foreground is a road and wall.	Otterhampton	Civil parish	831	Bridgwater Rural District	Sedgemoor	51.18°N 3.08°W	
Stone building with prominent square tower. In the foreground are daffodils.	Over Stowey	Civil parish	352	Bridgwater Rural District	Sedgemoor	51.15°N 3.15°W	
modern building with shop. Sign over window says Pawlett Country Store & Off Licence.	Pawlett	Civil Parish	1,038	Bridgwater Rural District	Sedgemoor	51.18°N 3.00°W	
Stone building with square tower	Puriton	Civil parish	1,068	Bridgwater Rural District	Sedgemoor	51.17°N 2.97°W	
Stone building with square tower	Shapwick	Civil parish	536	Bridgwater Rural District	Sedgemoor	51.14°N 2.83°W	
Stone cross surrounded by railings on grass area in front of roads and houses.	Shipham	Civil parish	1,087	Axbridge Rural District	Sedgemoor	51.31°N 2.80°W	
White painted building with pub sign saying The Lamb Inn	Spaxton	Civil parish	1,012	Bridgwater Rural District	Sedgemoor	51.13°N 3.11°W	
Stone building with small square tower. In the foreground is a road and wall.	Stawell	Civil parish	386	Bridgwater Rural District	Sedgemoor	51.14°N 2.91°W	
Houses amongst trees seen across fields and hedges.	Stockland Bristol	Civil parish	165	Bridgwater Rural District	Sedgemoor	51.19°N 3.08°W	
White painted building with black timbers. In the foreground is a road and road sign.	Thurloxton	Civil parish	153	Bridgwater Rural District	Sedgemoor	51.07°N 3.04°W	
Gray stone building with square tower	Weare	Civil parish	658	Axbridge Rural District	Sedgemoor	51.27°N 2.84°W	
Stone building with square tower	Wedmore	Civil Parish	3,318	Axbridge Rural District	Sedgemoor	51.23°N 2.81°W	
Red stone building with square tower. In the foreground are gravestones.	Wembdon	Civil parish	3,613	Bridgwater Rural District	Sedgemoor	51.13°N 3.02°W	
Stone building with arched window and square tower, separated from the road by a stone wall and railings.	West Huntspill	Civil parish	1,414	Bridgwater Rural District	Sedgemoor	51.20°N 2.98°W	
Stone building with square tower	Westonzoyland	Civil parish	1,801	Bridgwater Rural District	Sedgemoor	51.11°N 2.92°W	
Stone building with square tower	Woolavington	Civil parish	2,115	Bridgwater Rural District	Sedgemoor	51.17°N 2.93°W	
Stone 3-storey building with white frames windows on street junction. Sign saying shop.	Abbas and Templecombe	Civil parish	1,560	Wincanton Rural District	South Somerset	50.99°N 2.41°W	
Stone building with small square tower.	Alford	Civil parish	63	Wincanton Rural District	South Somerset	51.08°N 2.57°W	
Stone building with sign saying The Old Pound Inn, on street junction.	Aller	Civil parish	410	Langport Rural District	South Somerset	51.05°N 2.85°W	
Patchwork of fields and trees with buildings showing in the distance. In the foreground is grass with a ruined building.	Ansford	Civil parish	1,085	Wincanton Rural District	South Somerset	51.09°N 2.51°W	
Stone building with prominent square tower. In the foreground are gravestones.	Ash	Civil parish	626	Yeovil Rural District	South Somerset	50.98°N 2.75°W	
Stone two stage square tower with buttresses.	Ashill	Civil parish	529	Chard Rural District	South Somerset	50.94°N 2.96°W	
Stone building with prominent square tower. In the foreground are gravestones.	Babcary	Civil parish	248	Langport Rural District	South Somerset	51.05°N 2.62°W	
Three bay house with multiple windows, pinnacles and chimneys	Barrington	Civil parish	438	Langport Rural District	South Somerset	50.96°N 2.87°W	
White painted houses with red roofs. In the background is a hill with a tower on it and in the foreground grass and hedgerows	Barton St David	Civil parish	561	Langport Rural District	South Somerset	51.08°N 2.65°W	
Stone building with sign saying The Royal Oak	Barwick	Civil parish	1,221	Yeovil Rural District	South Somerset	50.92°N 2.62°W	
Green area with trees. In the background a terrace of houses.	Beercrocombe	Civil parish	134	Langport Rural District	South Somerset	50.98°N 2.97°W	
Small stone building with square tower partially obscured by trees. In the foreground is a stone wall with metal gates.	Compton Pauncefoot	Civil parish	130	Wincanton Rural District	South Somerset	51.03°N 2.50°W	
Stone building with square tower.	Bratton Seymour	Civil parish	104	Wincanton Rural District	South Somerset	51.07°N 2.47°W	
Area of still water surrounded by trees and grass.	Brewham	Civil parish	441	Wincanton Rural District	South Somerset	51.13°N 2.40°W	
Old stone building with thatched roof on road junction.	Broadway	Civil parish	740	Chard Rural District	South Somerset	50.93°N 2.97°W	
multiple buildings including a square church tower amongst fields and trees.	Bruton	Town	2,907	Wincanton Rural District	South Somerset	51.11°N 2.45°W	
Yellow stone building at the end of a driveway accessed via stone gateposts.	Brympton	Civil parish	7,308	Yeovil Rural District	South Somerset	50.94°N 2.68°W	
Old buildings behind a wall	Buckland St Mary	Civil parish	521	Chard Rural District	South Somerset	50.91°N 3.04°W	
A church with spire surrounded by trees and houses.	Castle Cary	Town	2,276	Wincanton Rural District	South Somerset	51.09°N 2.51°W	
Stone building with square tower.	Chaffcombe	Civil parish	229	Chard Rural District	South Somerset	50.89°N 2.92°W	
Street scene showing shops, cars and a set of traffic lights.	Chard Town	Town	13,074	Chard Municipal Borough	South Somerset	50.87°N 2.96°W	
Stone building with square tower. In the foreground is a garssy area with gravestones.	Charlton Horethorne	Civil parish	591	Wincanton Rural District	South Somerset	51.01°N 2.48°W	
Stone building with small tower attached to the right hand side. At the nearest end is a circular window above an arched doorway.	Charlton Musgrove	Civil parish	398	Wincanton Rural District	South Somerset	51.08°N 2.39°W	
Stone building with tiled roof.	Chillington	Civil parish	164	Chard Rural District	South Somerset	50.89°N 2.87°W	
Stone building with small bell tower. In the foreground are gravestones.	Chilthorne Domer	Civil parish	574	Yeovil Rural District	South Somerset	50.97°N 2.68°W	
Stone building with square tower, partially obscured by trees.	Chilton Cantelo	Civil parish	445	Yeovil Rural District	South Somerset	51.00°N 2.60°W	
Stone building with spire surrounded by trees.	Chiselborough	Civil parish	275	Yeovil Rural District	South Somerset	50.93°N 2.76°W	
Stone building with square tower	Closworth	Civil parish	220	Yeovil Rural District	South Somerset	50.89°N 2.62°W	
Street scene showing multiple houseson the far side of the road. In the foreground is a metal railing.	Combe St Nicholas	Civil parish	1,373	Chard Rural District	South Somerset	50.89°N 2.99°W	
A patchwork of green and yellow fields with the roofs of houses visible centrally. In the background are hills and in the foreground the backs of several seated people.	Compton Dundon	Civil parish	705	Langport Rural District	South Somerset	51.09°N 2.73°W	
Square church tower surrounded by trees with a road in the foreground.	Corton Denham	Civil parish	189	Wincanton Rural District	South Somerset	51.00°N 2.52°W	
Decorated yellow stone building with square tower.	Crewkerne	Town	7,000	Crewkerne Urban District	South Somerset	50.88°N 2.79°W	
Large house with terrace and lawn.	Cricket St Thomas	Civil parish	50	Chard Rural District	South Somerset	50.87°N 2.89°W	
Thatched and red roofed houses along a road with a patchwork of fields behind.	Cucklington	Civil parish	173	Wincanton Rural District	South Somerset	51.05°N 2.35°W	
Stone building with arched windows. In the foreground are gravestones.	Cudworth	Civil parish	69	Chard Rural District	South Somerset	50.89°N 2.89°W	
Road sign on junction. In the background is a building partially obscured by a tree.	Curry Mallet	Civil parish	306	Langport Rural District	South Somerset	50.99°N 2.96°W	
Stone building with a road in the foregrond. In the background is the quare tower of a church.	Curry Rivel	Civil parish	2,148	Langport Rural District	South Somerset	51.03°N 2.86°W	
Stone building with arched window and slate roof. In the foreground are gravestones.	Dinnington	Civil parish	65	Chard Rural District	South Somerset	50.91°N 2.85°W	
alt-Stone building with square tower	Donyatt	Civil parish	347	Chard Rural District	South Somerset	50.93°N 2.95°W	
Stone bridge with four arches and low parapet.	Dowlish Wake	Civil parish	277	Chard Rural District	South Somerset	50.91°N 2.89°W	
Stone square tower with gravestones in the foreground.	Drayton	Civil parish	379	Langport Rural District	South Somerset	51.019°N 2.85°W	
Stone building with square tower. In the foreground are gravestones.	East Chinnock	Civil parish	479	Yeovil Rural District	South Somerset	50.92°N 2.72°W	
Stone building with square tower.	East Coker	Civil parish	1,667	Yeovil Rural District	South Somerset	50.91°N 2.65°W	
Stone building with square tower, separated from the road in the foreground by a stone wall.	Fivehead	Civil parish	609	Langport Rural District	South Somerset	50.99°N 2.92°W	
Tall house with upper story projecting above the ground floor and faced with white wooden boards.	Hambridge and Westport	Civil parish	514	Langport Rural District	South Somerset	50.99°N 2.86°W	
Two-storey stone houses with a road in front.	Hardington Mandeville	Civil parish	585	Yeovil Rural District	South Somerset	50.90°N 2.69°W	
Yellow stone building with square tower.	Haselbury Plucknett	Civil parish	744	Yeovil Rural District	South Somerset	50.89°N 2.75°W	
Stone building with arched windows and square tower partially obscured by trees. In the foreground are gravestones.	Henstridge	Civil parish	1,814	Wincanton Rural District	South Somerset	50.97°N 2.39°W	
Stone building with square tower.	High Ham	Civil parish	909	Langport Rural District	South Somerset	51.08°N 2.82°W	
Stone building with arched windows and square tower. In the foreground are gravestones.	Hinton St George	Civil parish	442	Chard Rural District	South Somerset	50.91°N 2.82°W	
Stone building with square tower behind stone wall.	Holton	Civil parish	238	Wincanton Rural District	South Somerset	51.04°N 2.45°W	
Stone building with arched windows and square tower.	Horsington	Civil parish	571	Wincanton Rural District	South Somerset	51.01°N 2.43°W	
Stone building with thatched roof. In the foreground are cars separated from the road by a stone wall.	Horton	Civil parish	812	Chard Rural District	South Somerset	50.93°N 2.97°W	
Stone building with arched windows and square tower.	Huish Episcopi	Civil parish	2,095	Langport Rural District	South Somerset	51.04°N 2.81°W	
Street scene showing a pub the Ilchester Arms on the left with several other buildings leading to a church tower.	Ilchester	Civil parish	2,153	Yeovil Rural District	South Somerset	51.00°N 2.68°W	
Elaborately ornamented stone building with square tower.	Ilminster	Town	5,808	Chard Rural District; Ilminster Urban District	South Somerset	50.93°N 2.91°W	
Thatched house with wisteria growing up the near end.	Ilton	Civil parish	854	Chard Rural District	South Somerset	50.95°N 2.92°W	
Stone building with arched window. Square tower surrounded by scaffolding.	Isle Abbots	Civil parish	205	Langport Rural District	South Somerset	50.98°N 2.92°W	
Stone building with square tower which becomes hexagonal near the roof.	Isle Brewers	Civil parish	150	Langport Rural District	South Somerset	50.99°N 2.90°W	
Stone building with square tower. In the foreground is a gateway with its own roof.	Keinton Mandeville	Civil parish	1,068	Langport Rural District	South Somerset	51.07°N 2.65°W	
Yellow stone building with square tower.	Kingsbury Episcopi	Civil parish	1,307	Langport Rural District	South Somerset	50.99°N 2.81°W	
Stone building with square tower.	Kingsdon	Civil parish	303	Langport Rural District	South Somerset	51.04°N 2.69°W	
Stone building with central square tower.	Kingstone	Civil parish	83	Chard Rural District	South Somerset	50.92°N 2.89°W	
Stone building with spire above a square tower.	Kingweston	Civil parish	128	Langport Rural District	South Somerset	51.08°N 2.68°W	
A series of houses along a lane.	Knowle St Giles	Civil parish	244	Chard Rural District	South Somerset	50.90°N 2.93°W	
A town with church tower seen on the far side of a wide river.	Langport	Town	1,081	Langport Rural District	South Somerset	51.04°N 2.83°W	
Stone bridge over water.	Long Load	Civil parish	332	Yeovil Rural District	South Somerset	51.01°N 2.76°W	
Stone bridge over water.	Long Sutton	Civil parish	833	Langport Rural District	South Somerset		
A line of cottages, some thatched, along a road.	Lopen	Civil parish	260	Chard Rural District	South Somerset	50.93°N 2.82°W	
Stone building with square tower.	Lovington	Civil parish	141	Wincanton Rural District	South Somerset	51.07°N 2.58°W	
Yellow stone building with square tower, surrounded by trees.	Maperton	Civil parish	140	Wincanton Rural District	South Somerset	51.04°N 2.46°W	
Stone building with square tower.	Marston Magna	Civil parish	523	Yeovil Rural District	South Somerset	51.00°N 2.58°W	
Stone building with square tower.	Martock	Civil parish	4,766	Yeovil Rural District	South Somerset	50.97°N 2.77°W	
Stone building with square tower.	Merriott	Civil parish	1,979	Chard Rural District	South Somerset	50.91°N 2.79°W	
Yellow stone building with arched windows and a square tower.	Milborne Port	Civil parish	2,802	Wincanton Rural District	South Somerset	50.97°N 2.46°W	
Stone building partially obscured by trees. In the foreground are gravestones.	Misterton	Civil parish	826	Chard Rural District	South Somerset	50.87°N 2.78°W	
View of the roofs of houses with a prominent square church tower, interspersed with trees.	Montacute	Civil parish	831	Yeovil Rural District	South Somerset	50.95°N 2.72°W	
Thatched stone house surrounded by trees. In the foreground a road junction and sign.	Muchelney	Civil parish	195	Langport Rural District	South Somerset	51.021°N 2.82°W	
Stone building with square tower. In the foreground is a road.	Mudford	Civil parish	696	Yeovil Rural District	South Somerset	50.97°N 2.61°W	
Stone building with square tower, surrounded by trees.	North Barrow	Civil parish	233	Wincanton Rural District	South Somerset	51.06°N 2.57°W	
Old mansion house with triangular roofs. In the foreground is a graden with gravestones.	North Cadbury	Civil parish	950	Wincanton Rural District	South Somerset	51.05°N 2.52°W	
Small stone building with gravestones in the foreground.	North Cheriton	Civil parish	208	Wincanton Rural District	South Somerset	51.03°N 2.44°W	
Stone building with square tower.	North Perrott	Civil parish	246	Yeovil Rural District	South Somerset	50.88°N 2.75°W	
Yellow stone building with square tower.	Norton sub Hamdon	Civil parish	743	Yeovil Rural District	South Somerset	50.94°N 2.76°W	
Yellow stone building with square tower, partially obscured by trees.	Odcombe	Civil parish	759	Yeovil Rural District	South Somerset	50.94°N 2.70°W	
Stone building with square tower.	Penselwood	Civil parish	273	Wincanton Rural District	South Somerset	51.08°N 2.35°W	
Two arches of a stone and brick bridge with a car beneath.	Pitcombe	Civil parish	532	Wincanton Rural District	South Somerset	51.10°N 2.47°W	
A view across fields to houses and the square tower of a yellow stone church.	Pitney	Civil parish	374	Langport Rural District	South Somerset	51.05°N 2.79°W	
A view through a gate and graveyard to a yellow stone building with a square tower.	Puckington	Civil parish	117	Langport Rural District	South Somerset	50.96°N 2.89°W	
Stone building with square tower.	Queen Camel	Civil parish	908	Wincanton Rural District	South Somerset	51.02°N 2.58°W	
Stone building with square tower.	Rimpton	Civil parish	235	Yeovil Rural District	South Somerset	50.99°N 2.56°W	
Stone building with square tower	Seavington St Mary	Civil parish	384	Chard Rural District	South Somerset	50.93°N 2.86°W	
Street scene with a row of detached houses including a pub.	Seavington St Michael	Civil parish	127	Chard Rural District	South Somerset	50.93°N 2.84°W	
Building with arched window and small turret.	Shepton Beauchamp	Civil parish	728	Chard Rural District	South Somerset	50.95°N 2.85°W	
Street scene with houses dotted amongst the trees.	Shepton Montague	Civil parish	208	Wincanton Rural District	South Somerset	51.08°N 2.47°W	
Street scene with houses and pub on the right and trees on the left.	Somerton	Town	4,697	Langport Rural District	South Somerset	51.05°N 2.74°W	
Stone building with square tower.	South Barrow	Civil parish	162	Wincanton Rural District	South Somerset	51.05°N 2.56°W	
Stone building with square tower.	South Cadbury and Sutton Montis	Civil parish	284	Wincanton Rural District	South Somerset	51.03°N 2.52°W	
Street scene showing houses with octagonal church tower behind	South Petherton	Civil parish	3,367	Yeovil Rural District	South Somerset	50.95°N 2.81°W	
Building with pub sign saying the Sparkford Inn with car park and road in the foreground.	Sparkford	Civil parish	617	Wincanton Rural District	South Somerset	51.04°N 2.57°W	
Yellow stone building with square tower set in green fields.	Stocklinch	Civil parish	154	Chard Rural District	South Somerset	50.95°N 2.88°W	
Yellow stone building with square tower set in graveyard.	Stoke sub Hamdon	Civil parish	1,068	Yeovil Rural District	South Somerset	50.95°N 2.75°W	
Street scene with a narrow road with houses on the right and trees on the left.	Stoke Trister	Civil parish	313	Wincanton Rural District	South Somerset	51.06°N 2.38°W	
Stone building with arched windows and small turret.	Tatworth and Forton	Civil parish	2,660	Chard Rural District	South Somerset	50.85°N 2.96°W	
Stone building with square tower separated from the road in the foreground by a stone wall.	The Charltons	Civil parish	1,073	Langport Rural District	South Somerset	51.05°N 2.68°W	
Street scene showing houses on the left and church with square tower on the left.	Tintinhull	Civil parish	902	Yeovil Rural District	South Somerset	50.97°N 2.71°W	
Green rolling hills with a cluster of houses and a church left of centre.	Wambrook	Civil parish	184	Chard Rural District	South Somerset	50.86°N 3.00°W	
Two-storey house with columns in front of the door.	Wayford	Civil parish	114	Chard Rural District	South Somerset	50.85°N 2.85°W	
Stone building with square tower topped by a small spires.	West Camel	Civil parish	459	Yeovil Rural District	South Somerset	51.02°N 2.60°W	
Building with square tower. In the foreground are gravestones.	West and Middle Chinnock	Civil parish	592	Yeovil Rural District	South Somerset	50.92°N 2.76°W	
Street scene with buildings on the right including a pub with sign The Castle.	West Coker	Civil parish	2,018	Yeovil Rural District	South Somerset	50.92°N 2.69°W	
Decorated yellow stone building with square tower.	West Crewkerne	Civil parish	631	Chard Rural District	South Somerset	50.88°N 2.79°W	
Stone church with square tower. In the foreground are a path and gravestones	Whitelackington	Civil parish	209	Chard Rural District	South Somerset	50.94°N 2.88°W	
Stone building with square tower. In the foreground are gravestones.	Whitestaunton	Civil parish	256	Chard Rural District	South Somerset	50.89°N 3.02°W	
Street scene with white and pink buildings.	Wincanton	Town	5,272	Wincanton Rural District	South Somerset	51.06°N 2.41°W	
Street scene, showing shops and houses including a post office.	Winsham	Civil parish	748	Chard Rural District	South Somerset	50.85°N 2.89°W	
Stone building with square tower separated from the road in the foreground by a stone wall.	Yarlington	Civil parish	123	Wincanton Rural District	South Somerset	51.06°N 2.49°W	
red brick building with small car park in front.	Yeovil	Town	30,378	Yeovil Municipal Borough	South Somerset	50.95°N 2.64°W	
Street scene with modern brick built shop.	Yeovil Without	Civil parish	6,834	Yeovil Rural District	South Somerset	50.96°N 2.65°W	
Wier on river with cows in the field beyond.	Yeovilton and District	Civil parish	1,425	Yeovil Rural District	South Somerset	51.00°N 2.65°W	
Old yew tree	Ashbrittle	Civil parish	225	Wellington Rural District	Taunton Deane Somerset West and Taunton	50.98°N 3.35°W	
Red stone building with square tower.	Ash Priors	Civil parish	155	Taunton Rural District	Taunton Deane Somerset West and Taunton	51.06°N 3.21°W	
Road junction with house on the right of the road. On the left is a churchyard behind a wall accessed via steps.	Bathealton	Civil parish	194	Wellington Rural District	Taunton Deane Somerset West and Taunton	51.01°N 3.31°W	
A few buildings scattered amongst fields and trees.	Bickenhall	Civil parish	122	Taunton Rural District	Taunton Deane Somerset West and Taunton	50.96°N 3.03°W	
Stone building with arched windows and square tower.	Bicknoller	Civil parish	371	Williton Rural District	West Somerset Somerset West and Taunton	51.15°N 3.27°W	
Yellow stone house with tall chimneys behind brick wall.	Bishop's Hull	Civil parish	2,975	Taunton Rural District	Taunton Deane Somerset West and Taunton	51.02°N 3.14°W	
Red stone building with square tower. In the foreground is a graveyard.	Bishops Lydeard	Civil parish	2,839 (includes Cotford St Luke)	Taunton Rural District	Taunton Deane Somerset West and Taunton	51.06°N 3.19°W	
Stone building with square tower.	Bradford-on-Tone	Civil parish	622	Wellington Rural District	Taunton Deane Somerset West and Taunton	51.00°N 3.18°W	
Stone building with square tower, partially obscured by trees. In the foreground are gravestones.	Brompton Ralph	Civil parish	287	Williton Rural District	West Somerset Somerset West and Taunton	51.08°N 3.31°W	
Several buildings including a square church tower amongst trees.	Brompton Regis	Civil parish	449	Dulverton Rural District	West Somerset Somerset West and Taunton	51.07°N 3.49°W	
Stone building with square tower, partially obscured by trees.	Brushford	Civil parish	519	Dulverton Rural District	West Somerset Somerset West and Taunton	51.02°N 3.53°W	
Arched bridge with metal railing. Sign showing River Parrett, Burrow Bridge.	Burrowbridge	Civil parish	508	Taunton Rural District	Taunton Deane Somerset West and Taunton	51.07°N 2.92°W	
Stone building with square tower. In the foreground are gravestones and trees.	Carhampton	Civil parish	865	Williton Rural District	West Somerset Somerset West and Taunton	51.17°N 3.42°W	
Large tree on the left of a field in the foreground with buildings in the distance.	Cheddon Fitzpaine	Civil parish	1,929	Taunton Rural District	Taunton Deane Somerset West and Taunton	51.04°N 3.08°W	
Houses and fields be3side a country lane.	Chipstable	Civil parish	309	Wellington Rural District	Taunton Deane Somerset West and Taunton	51.04°N 3.37°W	
Stone building with square tower, partially obscured by trees.	Churchstanton	Civil parish	752	Taunton Rural District	Taunton Deane Somerset West and Taunton	50.92°N 3.15°W	
Stone building with square tower. In the foreground are stone crosses, gravestones and trees.	Clatworthy	Civil parish	101	Williton Rural District	West Somerset Somerset West and Taunton	51.07°N 3.35°W	
Street scene with houses and trees separated from the road by a stone wall.	Combe Florey	Civil parish	261	Taunton Rural District	Taunton Deane Somerset West and Taunton	51.08°N 3.21°W	
Celtic pattern stone cross in the foreground with trees and houses in the background.	Corfe	Civil parish	253	Taunton Rural District	Taunton Deane Somerset West and Taunton	50.97°N 3.09°W	
Modern suburban housing estate with cars parked.	Cotford St Luke	Civil parish	created post-census	Taunton Rural District	Taunton Deane Somerset West and Taunton	51.0392°N 3.1886°W	
Large house seen through trees.	Cothelstone	Civil parish	111	Taunton Rural District	Taunton Deane Somerset West and Taunton	51.08°N 3.16°W	
Bridge over still water with a house to the right.	Creech St Michael	Civil parish	2,416	Taunton Rural District	Taunton Deane Somerset West and Taunton	51.02°N 3.04°W	
Stone building with square tower. In the foreground are stone crosses, gravestones and trees.	Crowcombe	Civil parish	489	Williton Rural District	West Somerset Somerset West and Taunton	51.12°N 3.23°W	
White painted building with arched windows. In the foreground are gravestones.	Curland	Civil parish	225	Taunton Rural District	Taunton Deane Somerset West and Taunton	50.95°N 3.03°W	
Stone building with square tower. In the foreground are gravestones.	Cutcombe	Civil parish	361	Williton Rural District	West Somerset Somerset West and Taunton	51.14°N 3.53°W	
Stone building with arched windows and square tower seen at the end of a narrow lane with white painted houses on the right and a wall on the left.	Dulverton	Town	1,408	Dulverton Rural District	West Somerset Somerset West and Taunton	51.05°N 3.55°W	
Street scene with houses and shops on the left and an octagonal structure has a central stone pier which supports a heavy timber framework which carries a slate roof with central wooden lantern surmounted by a weather vane. In the distance is a castle.	Dunster	Civil parish	817	Williton Rural District	West Somerset Somerset West and Taunton	51.18°N 3.45°W	
Stone building with square tower and arched windows.	Durston	Civil parish	136	Taunton Rural District	Taunton Deane Somerset West and Taunton	51.05°N 3.01°W	
Stone building with square tower amongst trees. In the foreground are cows in a field.	East Quantoxhead	Civil parish	104	Williton Rural District	West Somerset Somerset West and Taunton	51.18°N 3.24°W	
Stone building with tiled roof and square tower, surrounded by vegetation.	Elworthy	Civil parish	103	Williton Rural District	West Somerset Somerset West and Taunton	51.11°N 3.31°W	
Stone building with square tower. Trees are to the right and behind with gravestones in the foreground.	Exford	Civil parish	405	Dulverton Rural District	West Somerset Somerset West and Taunton	51.13°N 3.64°W	
Mound of stones with fields in the background.	Exmoor	Civil parish	251	Dulverton Rural District	West Somerset Somerset West and Taunton	51.14°N 3.75°W	
Wooden waterwheel on the side of a white painted building, partially obscured by trees.	Exton	Civil parish	243	Dulverton Rural District	West Somerset Somerset West and Taunton	51.09°N 3.54°W	
Reddish building with square tower.	Fitzhead	Civil parish	264	Wellington Rural District	Taunton Deane Somerset West and Taunton	51.05°N 3.26°W	
Reddish stone building with square tower.	Halse	Civil parish	290	Taunton Rural District	Taunton Deane Somerset West and Taunton	51.04°N 3.23°W	
Gray stone building with square tower and slate roof.	Hatch Beauchamp	Civil parish	620	Taunton Rural District	Taunton Deane Somerset West and Taunton	50.98°N 2.99°W	
Buildings nestled in rolling hills.	Holford	Civil parish	392	Williton Rural District	West Somerset Somerset West and Taunton	51.16°N 3.21°W	
Square stone tower with gravestones in the foreground.	Huish Champflower	Civil parish	301	Dulverton Rural District	West Somerset Somerset West and Taunton	51.06°N 3.36°W	
Stone wall with window of ruined building.	Kilve	Civil parish	344	Williton Rural District	West Somerset Somerset West and Taunton	51.18°N 3.22°W	
Gray stone building with ornate square tower and slate roof. In the foreground are gravestones.	Kingston St Mary	Civil parish	921	Taunton Rural District	Taunton Deane Somerset West and Taunton	51.06°N 3.11°W	
Church tower seen across fields	Langford Budville	Civil parish	535	Wellington Rural District	Taunton Deane Somerset West and Taunton	51.00°N 3.27°W	
Looking down on the village with houses and stone church building with square tower.	Luccombe	Civil parish	157	Williton Rural District	West Somerset Somerset West and Taunton	51.19°N 3.56°W	
Stone bridge over water, surrounded by vegetation.	Luxborough	Civil parish	237	Williton Rural District	West Somerset Somerset West and Taunton	51.13°N 3.46°W	
Reddish building with square tower.	Lydeard St Lawrence	Civil parish	506	Taunton Rural District	Taunton Deane Somerset West and Taunton	51.09°N 3.25°W	
Reddish stone building with square tower. In the foreground are a cross and lamppost.	Milverton	Civil parish	1,438	Wellington Rural District	Taunton Deane Somerset West and Taunton	51.02°N 3.25°W	
Town seen from a nearby hill with multiple houses. The sea can be seen on the left and the white tent like canopy left of centre is the Butlins centre.	Minehead	Town	11,981	Williton Rural District; Minehead Urban District	West Somerset Somerset West and Taunton	51.20°N 3.47°W	
Old stone building with archway.	Minehead Without	Civil parish	60	Williton Rural District	West Somerset Somerset West and Taunton	51.20°N 3.51°W	
Stone building with square tower.	Monksilver	Civil parish	113	Williton Rural District	West Somerset Somerset West and Taunton	51.13°N 3.33°W	
Reddish stone buildings. The church in the foreground has a square tower.	Nettlecombe	Civil parish	174	Williton Rural District	West Somerset Somerset West and Taunton	51.13°N 3.35°W	
Ornate church building with hexagonal tower.	North Curry	Civil parish	1,640	Taunton Rural District	Taunton Deane Somerset West and Taunton	51.02°N 2.96°W	
Stone building with square tower.	Norton Fitzwarren	Civil parish	3,046	Taunton Rural District	Taunton Deane Somerset West and Taunton	51.02°N 3.15°W	
Reddish building with square tower.	Nynehead	Civil parish	415	Wellington Rural District	Taunton Deane Somerset West and Taunton	50.99°N 3.23°W	
Red stone church with square tower.	Oake	Civil parish	765	Wellington Rural District	Taunton Deane Somerset West and Taunton	51.02°N 3.21°W	
Small stone bridge over a stream	Oare	Civil parish	68	Williton Rural District	West Somerset Somerset West and Taunton	51.20°N 3.71°W	
Stone building with square tower. In the foreground are gravestones.	Old Cleeve	Civil parish	1,672	Williton Rural District	West Somerset Somerset West and Taunton	51.17°N 3.38°W	
Red stone building with grey square tower.	Orchard Portman	Civil parish	150	Taunton Rural District	Taunton Deane Somerset West and Taunton	50.99°N 3.08°W	
Stone building with square tower.	Otterford	Civil parish	356	Taunton Rural District	Taunton Deane Somerset West and Taunton	50.92°N 3.10°W	
	Pitminster	Civil parish	956	Taunton Rural District	Taunton Deane Somerset West and Taunton	50.97°N 3.11°W	
Street scene showing stone church with truncated spire, On the right is a white painted building.	Porlock	Civil parish	1,440	Williton Rural District	West Somerset Somerset West and Taunton	51.21°N 3.60°W	
Stone building with square tower showing across fields.	Ruishton	Civil parish	1,473	Taunton Rural District	Taunton Deane Somerset West and Taunton	51.02°N 3.05°W	
Several houses and school behind fields and hedgerows.	Sampford Arundel	Civil parish	268	Wellington Rural District	Taunton Deane Somerset West and Taunton	50.96°N 3.28°W	
Stone building with white painted square tower. In the foreground is a road junction.	Sampford Brett	Civil parish	270	Williton Rural District	West Somerset Somerset West and Taunton	51.16°N 3.31°W	
Thatched roofs of white painted houses nestled in tree filled valley.	Selworthy	Civil parish	477	Williton Rural District	West Somerset Somerset West and Taunton	51.21°N 3.55°W	
Stone building with square tower. In the foreground are gravestones.	Skilgate	Civil parish	100	Dulverton Rural District	West Somerset Somerset West and Taunton	51.04°N 3.45°W	
Stone manor house with tall chimneys. In front of the house are gardens and trees.	Staple Fitzpaine	Civil parish	189	Taunton Rural District	Taunton Deane Somerset West and Taunton	50.96°N 3.05°W	
A village of houses nestled in rolling green hills.	Stawley	Civil parish	279	Wellington Rural District	Taunton Deane Somerset West and Taunton	51.00°N 3.33°W	
Wooden signal box next to railway platform decorated with flowers.	Stogumber	Civil parish	702	Williton Rural District	West Somerset Somerset West and Taunton	51.13°N 3.29°W	
White painted church with square tower topped with a spire.	Stogursey	Civil parish	1,385	Williton Rural District	West Somerset Somerset West and Taunton	51.18°N 3.14°W	
Stone building with Octagonal tower topped by a short spirelet.	Stoke St Gregory	Civil parish	942	Taunton Rural District	Taunton Deane Somerset West and Taunton	51.04°N 2.94°W	
Stone building with square tower.	Stoke St Mary	Civil parish	421	Taunton Rural District	Taunton Deane Somerset West and Taunton	50.99°N 3.05°W	
Stone church with red tiled roofs.	Stringston	Civil parish	116	Williton Rural District	West Somerset Somerset West and Taunton	51.18°N 3.18°W	
Taunton church.	Taunton	Civil parish		Taunton Municipal Borough	Taunton Deane Somerset West and Taunton	51.019°N 3.100°W	
White building with square tower.	Thornfalcon	Civil parish	119	Taunton Rural District	Taunton Deane Somerset West and Taunton	51.01°N 3.02°W	
Reddish stone church with square tower.	Timberscombe	Civil parish	402	Williton Rural District	West Somerset Somerset West and Taunton	51.13°N 3.54°W	
Stone building with square tower.	Tolland	Civil parish	81	Taunton Rural District	West Somerset Somerset West and Taunton	51.08°N 3.28°W	
Stone kilns built into a bank with a road in front.	Treborough	Civil parish	51	Williton Rural District	West Somerset Somerset West and Taunton	51.12°N 3.41°W	
Stone building with square tower.	Trull	Civil parish	2,288	Taunton Rural District	Taunton Deane Somerset West and Taunton	51.00°N 3.12°W	
Stone building with small bell tower. In the foreground are gravestones.	Upton	Civil parish	250	Dulverton Rural District	West Somerset Somerset West and Taunton	51.10°N 3.44°W	
View of multiple houses with sea on the left and hills in the background.	Watchet	Town	3,785	Watchet Urban District	West Somerset Somerset West and Taunton	51.18°N 3.33°W	
Roofs of several houses with the square tower of the church prominent amongst them. In the background are fields and hills.	Wellington	Town	13,822	Wellington Urban District	Taunton Deane Somerset West and Taunton	50.98°N 3.22°W	
	Wellington Without	Civil parish	727	Wellington Rural District	Taunton Deane Somerset West and Taunton	50.96°N 3.23°W	
White painted building to the right of the road, with a sign saying The Rising Sun.	West Bagborough	Civil parish	358	Taunton Rural District	Taunton Deane Somerset West and Taunton	51.09°N 3.18°W	
Stone building with square tower and stair turret.	West Buckland	Civil parish	1,189	Wellington Rural District	Taunton Deane Somerset West and Taunton	50.98°N 3.18°W	
Stone church with square tower	West Hatch	Civil parish	306	Taunton Rural District	Taunton Deane Somerset West and Taunton	50.98°N 3.02°W	
Stone building with square tower, partially obscured by trees.	West Monkton	Civil parish	2,787	Taunton Rural District	Taunton Deane Somerset West and Taunton	51.05°N 3.05°W	
Waterfall cascading down rockface.	West Quantoxhead	Civil parish	343	Williton Rural District	West Somerset Somerset West and Taunton	51.17°N 3.27°W	
Stone building with arched doorway and windows. Two small towers.	Williton	Civil parish	2,607	Williton Rural District	West Somerset Somerset West and Taunton	51.16°N 3.31°W	
Stone building with square tower. In the foreground are gravestones.	Winsford	Civil parish	321	Dulverton Rural District	West Somerset Somerset West and Taunton	51.10°N 3.57°W	
White painted church with square tower.	Withycombe	Civil parish	293	Williton Rural District	West Somerset Somerset West and Taunton	51.16°N 3.41°W	
Stone bridge with six arches over water.	Withypool and Hawkridge	Civil parish	201	Dulverton Rural District	West Somerset Somerset West and Taunton	51.11°N 3.65°W	
Street scene with buildings and shops. The three-storey building on the left has a sign saying The Courthouse.	Wiveliscombe	Town	2,893	Wellington Rural District	Taunton Deane Somerset West and Taunton	51.04°N 3.31°W	
Stone building with square tower. In the foreground are gravestones.	Wootton Courtenay	Civil parish	264	Williton Rural District	West Somerset Somerset West and Taunton	51.18°N 3.52°W	

== See also ==
- List of civil parishes in England
- List of ecclesiastical parishes in the Diocese of Bath and Wells
