= West Chinnock =

Village in Somerset, England

Coordinates: 50.9200°N 2.7583°W

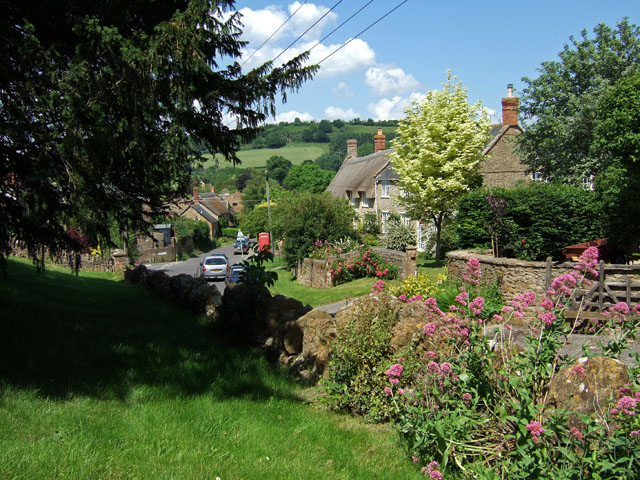

- Location within Somerset
- Population: 592
- OS grid reference: ST467136
- Civil parish: West and Middle Chinnock
- Unitary authority: Somerset
- Ceremonial county: Somerset
- Region: South West
- Country: England
- Sovereign state: United Kingdom
- Post town: CREWKERNE
- Postcode district: TA18 7
- Dialling code: 01935
- Police: Avon and Somerset
- Fire: Devon and Somerset
- Ambulance: South Western
- UK Parliament: Yeovil

West Chinnock is a village in the civil parish of West and Middle Chinnock, in the Somerset district, in the ceremonial county of Somerset, England. It is 4 miles (6.4 km) north east of Crewkerne. It occupies a central position east of the road that links Crewkerne to the A303 road and is mainly south of a brook that feeds nearby into the Parrett. The village forms the civil parish of West and Middle Chinnock with the neighbouring village of Middle Chinnock. The parish has a population of 592 (2011 census).

== History ==
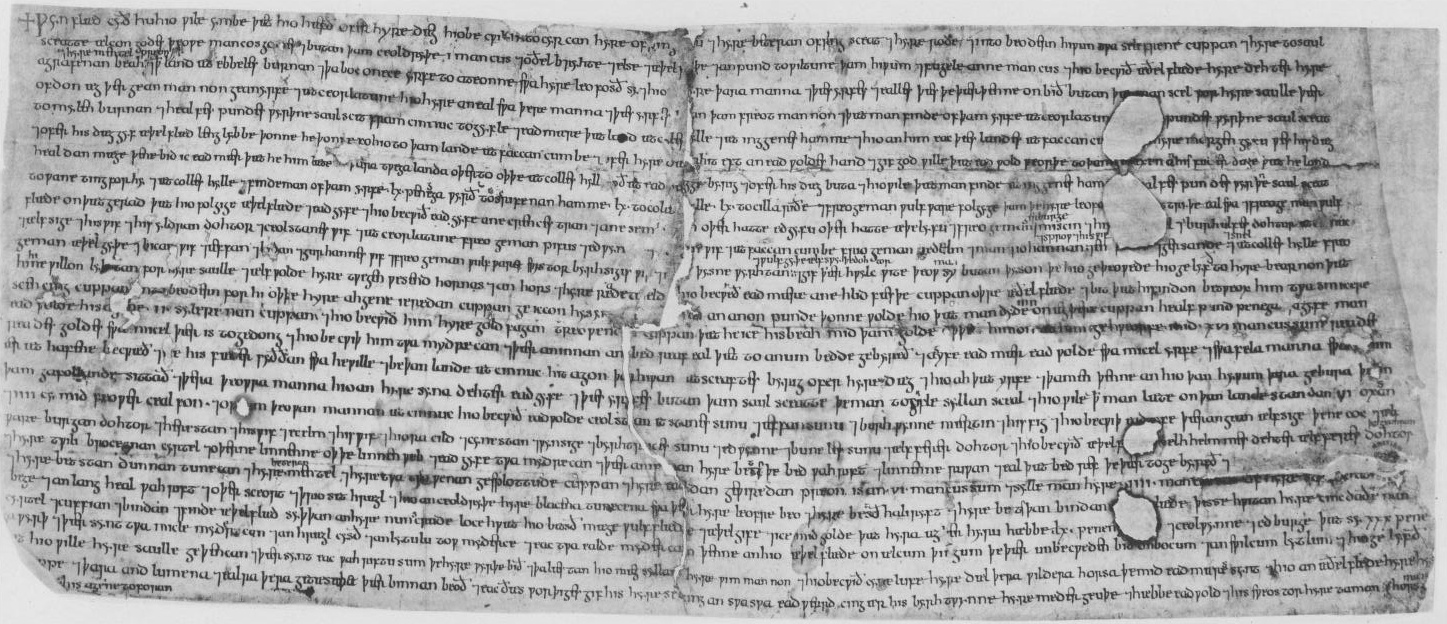
Will of Wynflæd, circa AD 950, mentions land at Cinnuc (11th-century copy, British Library Cotton Charters viii. 38)

The origin of the name Chinnock is uncertain. It may be derived from the Old English cinu meaning ravine or cinn meaning a chin shaped hill, with the addition of ock meaning little. An alternative derivation may be an old hill-name of Celtic origin.

The Chinnocks were held as one estate in Saxon times by Wynflaed under Shaftesbury Abbey but by the time of the Norman Conquest in 1066 East Chinnock, West Chinnock and Middle Chinnock had been separated.

== Governance ==
The parish council has co-responsibility for some local issues so sets an annual precept (local rate) to cover its costs and makes annual accounts for public scrutiny. It can submit its evaluation report into all planning applications and works with police, other councils' officers, and neighbourhood watch groups on matters of crime/security, traffic and highways. Conservation matters (including trees and listed buildings) and the environment can be in its reports and initiatives. It maintains and repairs some of, and consults with both higher-tier councils, as to more of, sports/leisure facilities, verges, parks, surface water drainage, paths, public transit and street cleaning.

For local government purposes, since 1 April 2023, the village comes under the unitary authority of Somerset Council. Prior to this, it was part of the non-metropolitan district of South Somerset (established under the Local Government Act 1972). It was part of Yeovil Rural District before 1974.

The village is part of the 'Parrett' electoral ward. This stretches from Chiselborough in the north, via East Chinnock to North Perrott in the south. The ward population at the 2011 census was 2,336.

It is served by the Yeovil seat in the House of Commons of the Parliament of the United Kingdom.

West Chinnock was a separate civil parish until 1884. It then absorbed the parish of Middle Chinnock. In 2003 the parish was renamed West and Middle Chinnock. In 1881 the parish (prior to the merge) had a population of 418.

== Landmarks ==
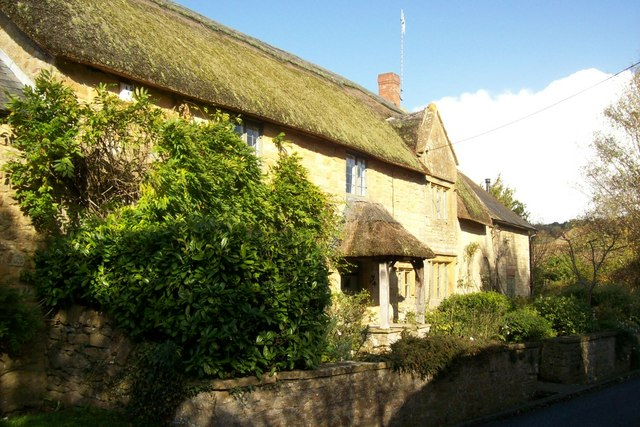
Manor Farm House

The Manor Farmhouse in West Chinnock retains large parts from the late 16th or early 17th century thus is in the middle category of listed buildings.

=== Church ===
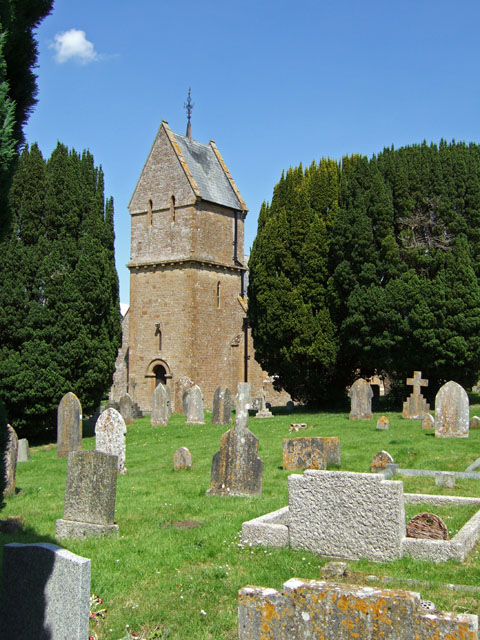
St Mary's Church

Ecclesiastically the parish of West Chinnock is now part of the united benefice of Norton-sub-Hamdon, West Chinnock, Chiselborough and Middle Chinnock.

The parish Church of Saint Mary has 13th-century origins but was totally rebuilt in the 19th century.

== Notable residents ==
- The second of the Austin baronets, died November 1940, was finally resident here.
- Retired brigadier Cyrus Greenslade, OBE, MBE, Legion of Merit (U.S.): Commander died aged 93, owner-occupier of the Manor House.
- "Sweeney, Timothy Patrick". WHO'S WHO & WHO WAS WHO. 2007. doi:10.1093/ww/9780199540884.013.U36818.
- Retired major Ronald Williams (Liberal politician), the 1923–1924 MP of the Sevenoaks seat, Kent, died 1971 – his latter home at: West Chinnock.

== Gallery ==
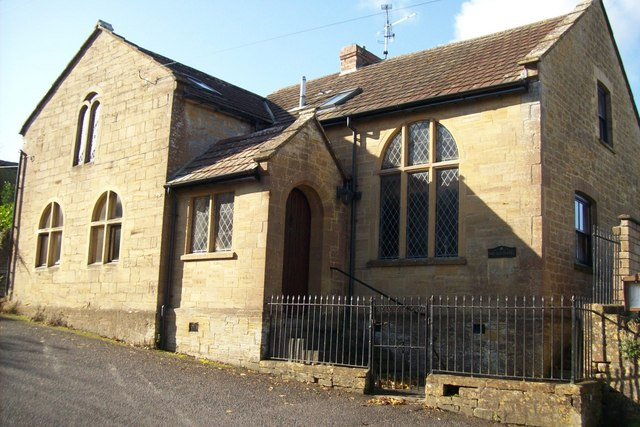
The Old Chapel

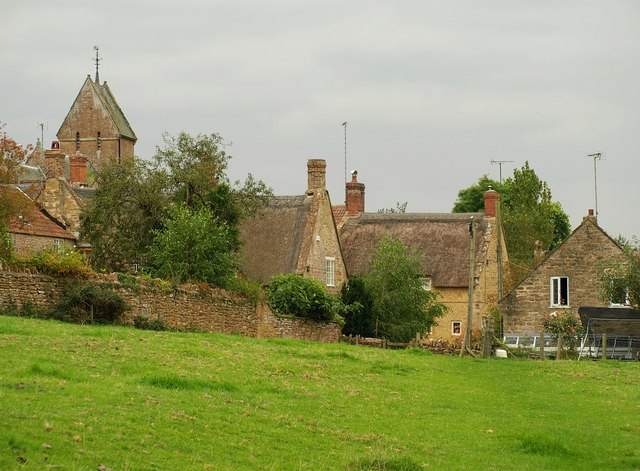
View of village

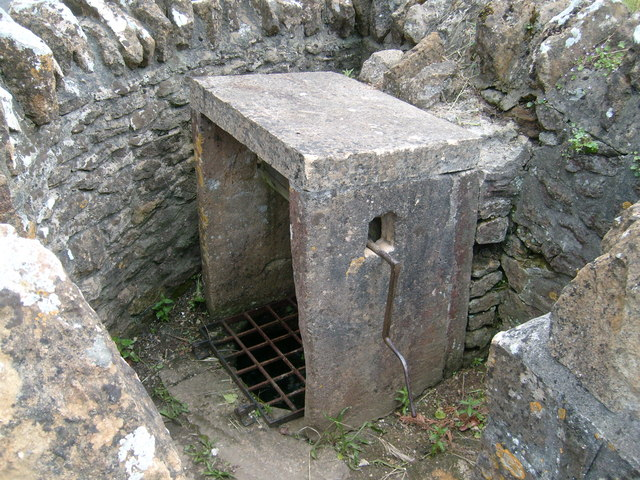
Well

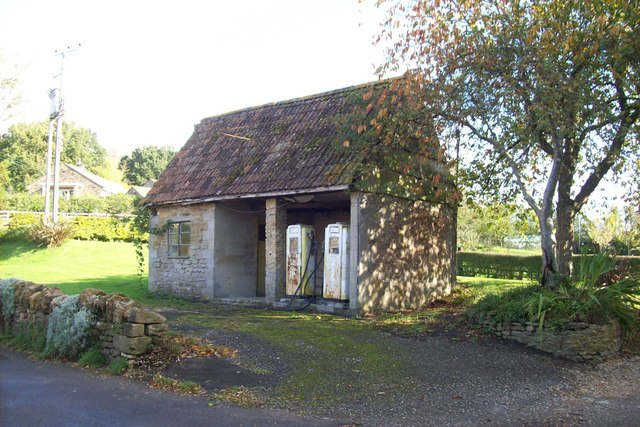
A disused filling station

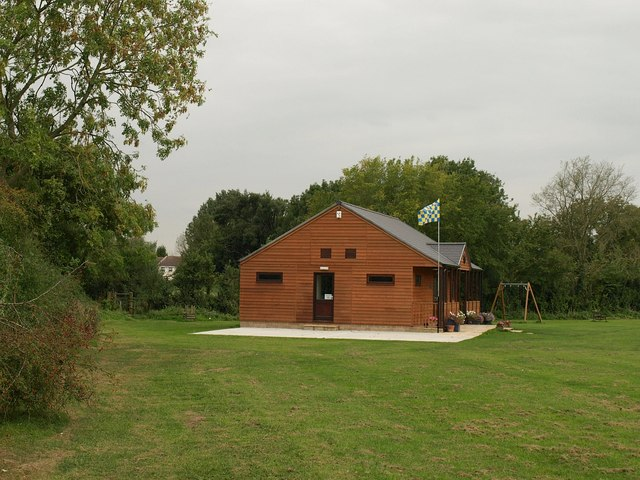
New pavilion

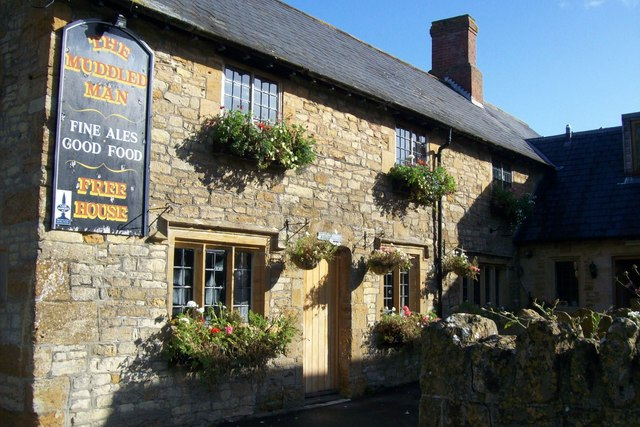
The Muddled Man pub
