= Horton, Somerset =

Village in Somerset, England

Coordinates: 50.9282°N 2.9687°W

Horton
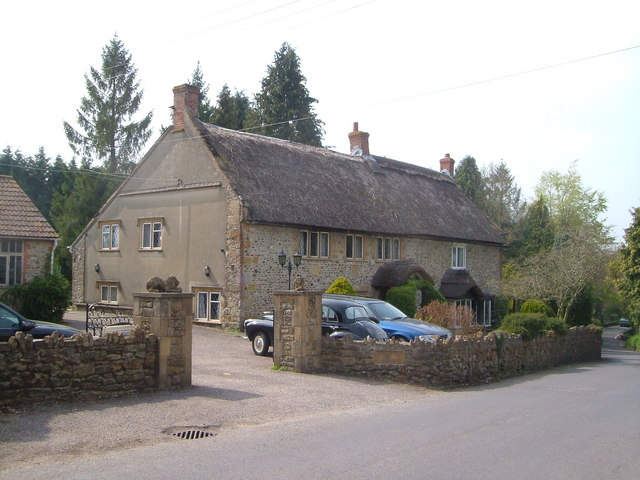
- A thatched cottage in Horton

- Location within Somerset
- Population: 812 (2011)
- OS grid reference: ST320147
- Unitary authority: Somerset Council
- Ceremonial county: Somerset
- Region: South West
- Country: England
- Sovereign state: United Kingdom
- Post town: Ilminster
- Postcode district: TA19
- Dialling code: 01460
- Police: Avon and Somerset
- Fire: Devon and Somerset
- Ambulance: South Western
- UK Parliament: Yeovil

Horton is a village and civil parish in Somerset, England, situated 5 miles (8.0 km) north of Chard. The parish had a population of 826 in 2021, and 812 in 2011.

== History ==
It is first attested as Horton in 1242. The place-name Horton is a common one in England. It derives from Old English horu 'dirt' and tūn 'settlement, farm, estate', presumably meaning 'farm on muddy soil'.

In 1782 the Ilminster Turnpike Trust constructed Jordans Bridge to carry the main road over a stream.

In 1880 Horton House was built as the manor house. It has been designated as a Grade II listed building.

During the late 1970s a small group of children from Channells Lane in Horton got together to form a club called "The Sword of Justice". They decided to try to raise some money for charity and arranged a village fete to raise money for Dr Barnardos. The fete proved very popular and was repeated the following year to raise money for the then very ropey playing field in the village. Again it was a great success and the yearly fete has since gone on to become a very important part of the village's social calendar, known as "Horton fete and flower show" from 2006. The money raised in previous years has been used to build a replacement village hall at the north side of the village. The Horton Flower Show is where local green-fingered individuals can compete for prizes and prestige, amongst which are the biggest marrow competition or best fairy cake.

== Governance ==
As a civil parish, Horton has a parish council with responsibility for local issues.

The village is in the Somerset unitary district, administered by Somerset Council. For elections to the council, it is in the Illminster electoral division.

Historically, Horton was in Chard Rural District from 1894 to 1974, and in South Somerset district from 1974 until the creation of Somerset unitary district in 2023.

It is part of the Yeovil constituency represented in the House of Commons.
