= Church of the Blessed Virgin Mary, West Chinnock =

Church in Somerset, England

Church of the Blessed Virgin Mary
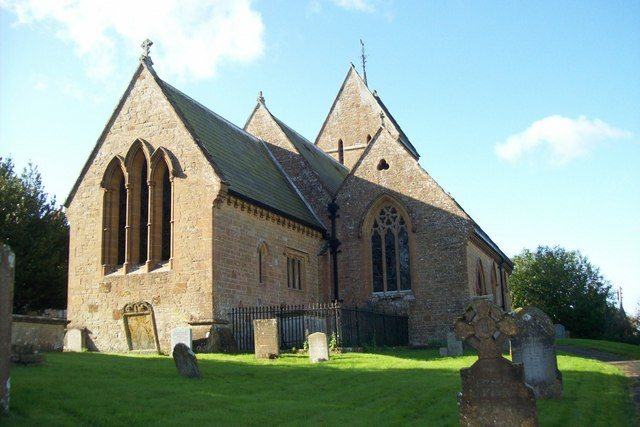

Religion
- Affiliation: Church of England
- Ecclesiastical or organizational status: Active

Location
- Location: West Chinnock, Somerset, England
- Interactive map of Church of the Blessed Virgin Mary
- Coordinates: 50.9177°N 2.7591°W

Architecture
- Architect: Charles Kirk
- Type: Church
- Style: Early English style
- Completed: 1890
- Materials: Hamstone

The Church of the Blessed Virgin Mary is a Church of England church in West Chinnock, Somerset, England. It has 13th-century origins but was largely rebuilt in 1889–90 to the design of Charles Kirk. It is a Grade II listed building and now forms part of the Ham Hill Churches Benefice.

== History ==
St Mary's has origins to the 13th-century, with the first recorded rector being Rev. John de Kirkeby in 1293. In 1821 and again in 1827, the church was enlarged. Plans for the church's restoration were drawn up in circa 1876, but the lack of funding stopped the scheme from being carried out. In addition to the required repair work, the rector of the time, Rev. Christian Frederick Newell, considered the existing church inadequate in its arrangement.

Later in 1889, Mrs. Sarah Woodcock of West Chinnock gifted £800 towards the rebuilding of the church, which prompted a meeting to be called in May 1889 to discuss the scheme. An additional £760 was promised by the parishioners towards the estimated £2,180 cost. The Earl of Ilchester, the principal landowner and patron of the living, donated £300, while the Bishop of Bath and Wells, the Right Rev. Lord Arthur Hervey, expressed his approval of the scheme and provided a donation.

The church was built by Charles Trask of Norton-sub-Hamdon to the plans of Charles Kirk of Sleaford. The final services in the old church were held on 28 July 1889 and the following day saw work begin on the removal of seating in preparation for demolition. While the new church was being built, the adjacent National Schoolroom was licensed to hold afternoon Sunday services and baptisms. Holy Communion and marriages were held at the churches at Chiselborough or Middle Chinnock.

The chief corner stone was laid during a ceremony by Mrs. Woodcock on 8 October 1889. Owing to the chancel's 13th-century features, the rebuilding attempted to preserve this section of the church as much as possible. The tower was demolished and rebuilt further west, allowing the main body of the church to be enlarged. The tower was partially built using stone from the old church. The church was opened and the enlarged churchyard consecrated by the Bishop of Bath and Wells on 24 July 1890.

== Architecture ==
St Mary's is built of Hamstone with Welsh slate on the roofs. It is made up of a nave, north and south aisles, chancel and west two-stage tower, with a vestry in the latter, underneath the belfry. The tower, approximately sixty feet in height, is surmounted by a weathervane and contains four bells; three of which were taken from the old church, with two being recast during the restoration of 1889–90. The fourth was a new addition, gifted by Mrs. Woodcock in memory of Abraham and Isaac Ford. The new bell and recasting of the old ones was carried out by Messrs Taylor of Loughborough. The open roof is built of Memel timber, with principals supported on carved corbels and circular-moulded ribs.

Some of the stained glass added in the 1889–90 restoration was gifted anonymously. The south window's stained glass was gifted by Mr. Richard Hayward of West Chinnock in memory of his grandfather. Mrs. Woodcock gifted the stained glass of the chancel south-east window in memory of the Ford family. The 13th-century piscina and sedilia of the chancel are retained in their original positions.

New fittings were provided for the rebuilt church, many of which were gifted. Major Hayward presented the oak altar table and reredos, the latter being made of Ancaster stone, with marble columns, caps and bases. Mr. Thomas March of Newton gifted the oak altar chairs in memory of John Patten of West Chinnock. The choir stalls and reading desk are of oak. The pulpit of Doulting stone was gifted by Misses E. and M. Hayward of London in memory of Thomas Carlyle Hayward. The font, gifted by the architect, is of Ancaster stone, with a marble column and Doulting stone base.

The 1889–90 restoration also saw the churchyard rearranged, enlarged and enclosed with a new boundary wall of Hamstone. To enlarge the churchyard, two cottages were demolished on the east side and one on the west side, the latter being gifted by the Earl of Ilchester.
