= South Somerset =

Former non-metropolitan district in England

- Non-metropolitan district

- Shown within Somerset
- Sovereign state: United Kingdom
- Constituent country: England
- Region: South West England
- Ceremonial county: Somerset
- Admin HQ: Yeovil
- Created: 1 April 1974
- Abolished: 1 April 2023

Government
  - Type: South Somerset District Council

Area
  - Total: 370.29 sq mi (959.04 km^{2})

Population (2024)
  - Total: 173,173
  - Density: 467.67/sq mi (180.57/km^{2})
- Time zone: UTC0 (GMT)
  - Summer (DST): UTC+1 (BST)
- Post Code: BA7-10BA20-22
- Area code: 01935/01963
- Website: http://www.southsomerset.gov.uk/

South Somerset was a local government district in Somerset, England, from 1974 to 2023. The district covered an area of 370 square miles (958 km^{2}) ranging from the borders with Devon, Wiltshire and Dorset to the edge of the Somerset Levels. It had a population of approximately 158,000. The administrative centre of the district was Yeovil.

On 1 April 2023, the district was abolished and replaced by Somerset Council, a unitary district for the area previously served by Somerset County Council.

== History ==
The district was formed on 1 April 1974, and was originally known as Yeovil, adopting the South Somerset name in 1985. It was formed by the merger of the municipal boroughs of Chard, Yeovil, along with Crewkerne and Ilminster urban districts and the Chard Rural District, Langport Rural District, Wincanton Rural District and Yeovil Rural District.

The district covered the whole of the Yeovil constituency, and part of Somerton and Frome. The district was governed by the South Somerset District Council, last elected in the 2019 South Somerset District Council election.

=== Abolition ===
On 1 April 2023, the district council was abolished and replaced by Somerset Council, a unitary authority for the area previously served by Somerset County Council. Elections for the new council took place in May 2022. It ran alongside South Somerset and the other district councils in the county until their abolition.

== Towns ==
Its main towns included:

- Bruton
- Castle Cary
- Chard
- Crewkerne
- Ilminster
- Langport
- Milborne Port
- Somerton
- Wincanton
- Yeovil

== Wards ==
The electoral wards included: Camelot and Wessex.

== Parishes ==
Image	Name	Status	Population	Former local authority	Coordinates	Refs
Stone 3-storey building with white frames windows on street junction. Sign saying shop.	Abbas and Templecombe	Civil parish	1,560	Wincanton Rural District	50.99°N 2.41°W	
Stone building with small square tower.	Alford	Civil parish	63	Wincanton Rural District	51.08°N 2.57°W	
Stone building with sign saying The Old Pound Inn, on street junction.	Aller	Civil parish	410	Langport Rural District	51.05°N 2.85°W	
Patchwork of fields and trees with buildings showing in the distance. In the foreground is grass with a ruined building.	Ansford	Civil parish	1,085	Wincanton Rural District	51.09°N 2.51°W	
Stone building with prominent square tower. In the foreground are gravestones.	Ash	Civil parish	626	Yeovil Rural District	50.98°N 2.75°W	
Stone two stage square tower with buttresses.	Ashill	Civil parish	529	Chard Rural District	50.94°N 2.96°W	
Stone building with prominent square tower. In the foreground are gravestones.	Babcary	Civil parish	248	Langport Rural District	51.05°N 2.62°W	
Three bay house with multiple windows, pinnacles and chimneys	Barrington	Civil parish	438	Langport Rural District	50.96°N 2.87°W	
White painted houses with red roofs. In the background is a hill with a tower on it and in the foreground grass and hedgerows	Barton St David	Civil parish	561	Langport Rural District	51.08°N 2.65°W	
Stone building with sign saying The Royal Oak	Barwick	Civil parish	1,221	Yeovil Rural District	50.92°N 2.62°W	
Green area with trees. In the background a terrace of houses.	Beercrocombe	Civil parish	134	Langport Rural District	50.98°N 2.97°W	
Small stone building with square tower partially obscured by trees. In the foreground is a stone wall with metal gates.	Compton Pauncefoot	Civil parish	130	Wincanton Rural District	51.03°N 2.50°W	
Stone building with square tower.	Bratton Seymour	Civil parish	104	Wincanton Rural District	51.07°N 2.47°W	
Area of still water surrounded by trees and grass.	Brewham	Civil parish	441	Wincanton Rural District	51.13°N 2.40°W	
Old stone building with thatched roof on road junction.	Broadway	Civil parish	740	Chard Rural District	50.93°N 2.97°W	
multiple buildings including a square church tower amongst fields and trees.	Bruton	Town	2,907	Wincanton Rural District	51.11°N 2.45°W	
Yellow stone building at the end of a driveway accessed via stone gateposts.	Brympton	Civil parish	7,308	Yeovil Rural District	50.94°N 2.68°W	
Old buildings behind a wall	Buckland St Mary	Civil parish	521	Chard Rural District	50.91°N 3.04°W	
A church with spire surrounded by trees and houses.	Castle Cary	Town	2,276	Wincanton Rural District	51.09°N 2.51°W	
Stone building with square tower.	Chaffcombe	Civil parish	229	Chard Rural District	50.89°N 2.92°W	
Street scene showing shops, cars and a set of traffic lights.	Chard Town	Town	13,074	Chard Municipal Borough	50.87°N 2.96°W	
Stone building with square tower. In the foreground is a grassy area with gravestones.	Charlton Horethorne	Civil parish	591	Wincanton Rural District	51.01°N 2.48°W	
Stone building with square tower separated from the road in the foreground by a stone wall.	Charlton Mackrell	Civil parish	1,073	Langport Rural District	51.05°N 2.68°W	
Stone building with small tower attached to the right hand side. At the nearest end is a circular window above an arched doorway.	Charlton Musgrove	Civil parish	398	Wincanton Rural District	51.08°N 2.39°W	
Stone building with tiled roof.	Chillington	Civil parish	164	Chard Rural District	50.89°N 2.87°W	
Stone building with small bell tower. In the foreground are gravestones.	Chilthorne Domer	Civil parish	574	Yeovil Rural District	50.97°N 2.68°W	
Stone building with square tower, partially obscured by trees.	Chilton Cantelo	Civil parish	445	Yeovil Rural District	51.00°N 2.60°W	
Stone building with spire surrounded by trees.	Chiselborough	Civil parish	275	Yeovil Rural District	50.93°N 2.76°W	
Stone building with square tower	Closworth	Civil parish	220	Yeovil Rural District	50.89°N 2.62°W	
Street scene showing multiple houseson the far side of the road. In the foreground is a metal railing.	Combe St Nicholas	Civil parish	1,373	Chard Rural District	50.89°N 2.99°W	
A patchwork of green and yellow fields with the roofs of houses visible centrally. In the background are hills and in the foreground the backs of several seated people.	Compton Dundon	Civil parish	705	Langport Rural District	51.09°N 2.73°W	
Square church tower surrounded by trees with a road in the foreground.	Corton Denham	Civil parish	189	Wincanton Rural District	51.00°N 2.52°W	
Junction near a busy town centre, with a town hall and nearby shops by the side of the road.	Crewkerne	Town	7,000	Crewkerne Urban District	50.88°N 2.79°W	
Large house with terrace and lawn.	Cricket St Thomas	Civil parish	50	Chard Rural District	50.87°N 2.89°W	
Thatched and red roofed houses along a road with a patchwork of fields behind.	Cucklington	Civil parish	173	Wincanton Rural District	51.05°N 2.35°W	
Stone building with arched windows. In the foreground are gravestones.	Cudworth	Civil parish	69	Chard Rural District	50.89°N 2.89°W	
Road sign on junction. In the background is a building partially obscured by a tree.	Curry Mallet	Civil parish	306	Langport Rural District	50.99°N 2.96°W	
Stone building with a road in the foregrond. In the background is the quare tower of a church.	Curry Rivel	Civil parish	2,148	Langport Rural District	51.03°N 2.86°W	
Stone building with arched window and slate roof. In the foreground are gravestones.	Dinnington	Civil parish	65	Chard Rural District	50.91°N 2.85°W	
alt-Stone building with square tower	Donyatt	Civil parish	347	Chard Rural District	50.93°N 2.95°W	
Stone bridge with four arches and low parapet.	Dowlish Wake	Civil parish	277	Chard Rural District	50.91°N 2.89°W	
Stone square tower with gravestones in the foreground.	Drayton	Civil parish	379	Langport Rural District	51.019°N 2.85°W	
Stone building with square tower. In the foreground are gravestones.	East Chinnock	Civil parish	479	Yeovil Rural District	50.92°N 2.72°W	
Stone building with square tower.	East Coker	Civil parish	1,667	Yeovil Rural District	50.91°N 2.65°W	
Stone building with square tower, separated from the road in the foreground by a stone wall.	Fivehead	Civil parish	609	Langport Rural District	50.99°N 2.92°W	
Tall house with upper story projecting above the ground floor and faced with white wooden boards.	Hambridge and Westport	Civil parish	514	Langport Rural District	50.99°N 2.86°W	
Two-storey stone houses with a road in front.	Hardington Mandeville	Civil parish	585	Yeovil Rural District	50.90°N 2.69°W	
Yellow stone building with square tower.	Haselbury Plucknett	Civil parish	744	Yeovil Rural District	50.89°N 2.75°W	
Stone building with arched windows and square tower partially obscured by trees. In the foreground are gravestones.	Henstridge	Civil parish	1,814	Wincanton Rural District	50.97°N 2.39°W	
Stone building with square tower.	High Ham	Civil parish	909	Langport Rural District	51.08°N 2.82°W	
Stone building with arched windows and square tower. In the foreground are gravestones.	Hinton St George	Civil parish	442	Chard Rural District	50.91°N 2.82°W	
Stone building with square tower behind stone wall.	Holton	Civil parish	238	Wincanton Rural District	51.04°N 2.45°W	
Stone building with arched windows and square tower.	Horsington	Civil parish	571	Wincanton Rural District	51.01°N 2.43°W	
Stone building with thatched roof. In the foreground are cars separated from the road by a stone wall.	Horton	Civil parish	812	Chard Rural District	50.93°N 2.97°W	
Stone building with arched windows and square tower.	Huish Episcopi	Civil parish	2,095	Langport Rural District	51.04°N 2.81°W	
Street scene showing a pub the Ilchester Arms on the left with several other buildings leading to a church tower.	Ilchester	Civil parish	2,153	Yeovil Rural District	51.00°N 2.68°W	
Elaborately ornamented stone building with square tower.	Ilminster	Town	5,808	Chard Rural District; Ilminster Urban District	50.93°N 2.91°W	
Thatched house with wisteria growing up the near end.	Ilton	Civil parish	854	Chard Rural District	50.95°N 2.92°W	
Stone building with arched window. Square tower surrounded by scaffolding.	Isle Abbots	Civil parish	205	Langport Rural District	50.98°N 2.92°W	
Stone building with square tower which becomes hexagonal near the roof.	Isle Brewers	Civil parish	150	Langport Rural District	50.99°N 2.90°W	
Stone building with square tower. In the foreground is a gateway with its own roof.	Keinton Mandeville	Civil parish	1,068	Langport Rural District	51.07°N 2.65°W	
Yellow stone building with square tower.	Kingsbury Episcopi	Civil parish	1,307	Langport Rural District	50.99°N 2.81°W	
Stone building with square tower.	Kingsdon	Civil parish	303	Langport Rural District	51.04°N 2.69°W	
Stone building with central square tower.	Kingstone	Civil parish	83	Chard Rural District	50.92°N 2.89°W	
Stone building with spire above a square tower.	Kingweston	Civil parish	128	Langport Rural District	51.08°N 2.68°W	
A series of houses along a lane.	Knowle St Giles	Civil parish	244	Chard Rural District	50.90°N 2.93°W	
A view down a central high street, surrounded by shops on both sides.	Langport	Town	1,081	Langport Rural District	51.04°N 2.83°W	
Stone bridge over water.	Long Load	Civil parish	332	Yeovil Rural District	51.01°N 2.76°W	
A small, rectangular building next to some gravestones.	Long Sutton	Civil parish	833	Langport Rural District	51.03°N 2.76°W	
A line of cottages, some thatched, along a road.	Lopen	Civil parish	260	Chard Rural District	50.93°N 2.82°W	
Stone building with square tower.	Lovington	Civil parish	141	Wincanton Rural District	51.07°N 2.58°W	
Yellow stone building with square tower, surrounded by trees.	Maperton	Civil parish	140	Wincanton Rural District	51.04°N 2.46°W	
A white and red building with blue-grey roofs next to a junction.	Marston Magna	Civil parish	523	Yeovil Rural District	51.00°N 2.58°W	
Stone building with square tower.	Martock	Civil parish	4,766	Yeovil Rural District	50.97°N 2.77°W	
Stone building with square tower.	Merriott	Civil parish	1,979	Chard Rural District	50.91°N 2.79°W	
Yellow stone building with arched windows and a square tower.	Milborne Port	Civil parish	2,802	Wincanton Rural District	50.97°N 2.46°W	
Stone building partially obscured by trees. In the foreground are gravestones.	Misterton	Civil parish	826	Chard Rural District	50.87°N 2.78°W	
View of the roofs of houses with a prominent square church tower, interspersed with trees.	Montacute	Civil parish	831	Yeovil Rural District	50.95°N 2.72°W	
Thatched stone house surrounded by trees. In the foreground a road junction and sign.	Muchelney	Civil parish	195	Langport Rural District	51.021°N 2.82°W	
Stone building with square tower. In the foreground is a road.	Mudford	Civil parish	696	Yeovil Rural District	50.97°N 2.61°W	
Stone building with square tower, surrounded by trees.	North Barrow	Civil parish	233	Wincanton Rural District	51.06°N 2.57°W	
Old mansion house with triangular roofs. In the foreground is a graden with gravestones.	North Cadbury	Civil parish	950	Wincanton Rural District	51.05°N 2.52°W	
Small stone building with gravestones in the foreground.	North Cheriton	Civil parish	208	Wincanton Rural District	51.03°N 2.44°W	
Stone building with square tower.	North Perrott	Civil parish	246	Yeovil Rural District	50.88°N 2.75°W	
Yellow stone building with square tower.	Norton sub Hamdon	Civil parish	743	Yeovil Rural District	50.94°N 2.76°W	
Yellow stone building with square tower, partially obscured by trees.	Odcombe	Civil parish	759	Yeovil Rural District	50.94°N 2.70°W	
Stone building with square tower.	Penselwood	Civil parish	273	Wincanton Rural District	51.08°N 2.35°W	
Two arches of a stone and brick bridge with a car beneath.	Pitcombe	Civil parish	532	Wincanton Rural District	51.10°N 2.47°W	
A view across fields to houses and the square tower of a yellow stone church.	Pitney	Civil parish	374	Langport Rural District	51.05°N 2.79°W	
A view through a gate and graveyard to a yellow stone building with a square tower.	Puckington	Civil parish	117	Langport Rural District	50.96°N 2.89°W	
Stone building with square tower.	Queen Camel	Civil parish	908	Wincanton Rural District	51.02°N 2.58°W	
Stone building with square tower.	Rimpton	Civil parish	235	Yeovil Rural District	50.99°N 2.56°W	
Stone building with square tower	Seavington St Mary	Civil parish	384	Chard Rural District	50.93°N 2.86°W	
Street scene with a row of detached houses including a pub.	Seavington St Michael	Civil parish	127	Chard Rural District	50.93°N 2.84°W	
Building with arched window and small turret.	Shepton Beauchamp	Civil parish	728	Chard Rural District	50.95°N 2.85°W	
Street scene with houses dotted amongst the trees.	Shepton Montague	Civil parish	208	Wincanton Rural District	51.08°N 2.47°W	
Street scene with houses and pub on the right and trees on the left.	Somerton	Town	4,697	Langport Rural District	51.05°N 2.74°W	
Stone building with square tower.	South Barrow	Civil parish	162	Wincanton Rural District	51.05°N 2.56°W	
Stone building with square tower.	South Cadbury	Civil parish	284	Wincanton Rural District	51.03°N 2.52°W	
Street scene showing houses with octagonal church tower behind	South Petherton	Civil parish	3,367	Yeovil Rural District	50.95°N 2.81°W	
Building with pub sign saying the Sparkford Inn with car park and road in the foreground.	Sparkford	Civil parish	617	Wincanton Rural District	51.04°N 2.57°W	
Yellow stone building with square tower set in green fields.	Stocklinch	Civil parish	154	Chard Rural District	50.95°N 2.88°W	
Yellow stone building with square tower set in graveyard.	Stoke sub Hamdon	Civil parish	1,068	Yeovil Rural District	50.95°N 2.75°W	
Street scene with a narrow road with houses on the right and trees on the left.	Stoke Trister	Civil parish	313	Wincanton Rural District	51.06°N 2.38°W	
Stone building with arched windows and small turret.	Tatworth and Forton	Civil parish	2,660	Chard Rural District	50.85°N 2.96°W	
Street scene showing houses on the left and church with square tower on the left.	Tintinhull	Civil parish	902	Yeovil Rural District	50.97°N 2.71°W	
Green rolling hills with a cluster of houses and a church left of centre.	Wambrook	Civil parish	184	Chard Rural District	50.86°N 3.00°W	
Two-storey house with columns in front of the door.	Wayford	Civil parish	114	Chard Rural District	50.85°N 2.85°W	
Stone building with square tower topped by a small spires.	West Camel	Civil parish	459	Yeovil Rural District	51.02°N 2.60°W	
Building with square tower. In the foreground are gravestones.	West and Middle Chinnock	Civil parish	592	Yeovil Rural District	50.92°N 2.76°W	
A series of terraced houses to the left of a road.	West Coker	Civil parish	2,018	Yeovil Rural District	50.92°N 2.69°W	
Decorated yellow stone building with square tower.	West Crewkerne	Civil parish	631	Chard Rural District	50.88°N 2.79°W	
Stone church with square tower. In the foreground are a path and gravestones	Whitelackington	Civil parish	209	Chard Rural District	50.94°N 2.88°W	
Stone building with square tower. In the foreground are gravestones.	Whitestaunton	Civil parish	256	Chard Rural District	50.89°N 3.02°W	
Street scene with white and pink buildings.	Wincanton	Town	5,272	Wincanton Rural District	51.06°N 2.41°W	
Street scene, showing shops and houses including a post office.	Winsham	Civil parish	748	Chard Rural District	50.85°N 2.89°W	
Stone building with square tower separated from the road in the foreground by a stone wall.	Yarlington	Civil parish	123	Wincanton Rural District	51.06°N 2.49°W	
red brick building with small car park in front.	Yeovil	Town	30,378	Yeovil Municipal Borough	50.95°N 2.64°W	
Street scene with modern brick built shop.	Yeovil Without	Civil parish	6,834	Yeovil Rural District	50.96°N 2.65°W	
View from the entrance to a short path leading to a church building with an adjoined tower on the right.	Yeovilton and District	Civil parish	1,425	Yeovil Rural District	51.00°N 2.65°W	

== Major roads ==
- A30
- A37
- A303
- A357

== Railway stations ==
- Bruton (Heart of Wessex Line and Reading to Taunton Line), Great Western Railway
- Castle Cary (Heart of Wessex Line and Reading to Taunton Line), Great Western Railway
- Crewkerne (West of England Main Line), South Western Railway
- Templecombe (West of England Main Line), South Western Railway
- Yeovil Junction (West of England Main Line), South Western Railway
- Yeovil Pen Mill (Heart of Wessex Line), Great Western Railway

== Heritage Railways ==
- Chard branch line, former Great Western Railway line between Chard and Taunton
- Yeovil Railway Centre

== Education ==
County schools (those which are not independent) in the five non-metropolitan districts of the county were operated by Somerset County Council (now Somerset Council).

For a full list of schools see: List of schools in Somerset

== See also ==
- Grade I listed buildings in South Somerset
- 2019–2023 structural changes to local government in England
