= Wincanton Rural District =

Former local government area in the UK

Coordinates: 51.056°N 2.410°W

- Area
  - 1911: 64,540 acres (261.2 km^{2})
  - 1961: 64,540 acres (261.2 km^{2})
- Population
  - 1911: 16,439
  - 1961: 16,833
- History
  - Created: 1894
  - Abolished: 1974
- Status: Rural district

Wincanton was a rural district in Somerset, England, from 1894 to 1974.

It was created in 1894 under the Local Government Act 1894.

In 1974 it was abolished under the Local Government Act 1972 when it became part of South Somerset.

The parishes which were part of the district included Abbas Combe, Alford, Ansford, Blackford, Bratton Seymour, Brewham, Bruton, Castle Cary, Charlton Horethorne, Charlton Musgrove, Compton Pauncefoot, Corton Denham, Cucklington, Henstridge, Holton, Horsington, Lovington, Maperton, Milborne Port, North Barrow, North Brewham, North Cadbury, North Cheriton, Penselwood, Pitcombe, Queen Camel, Shepton Montague, South Barrow, South Brewham, South Cadbury, Sparkford, Stoke Trister, Stowell, Sutton Montis, Weston Bampfylde, Wheathill, Wincanton and Yarlington.
