= Langport Rural District =

Former local government area in the UK

Coordinates: 51.038°N 2.827°W

- Area
  - 1911: 59,407
  - 1961: 59,407
- Population
  - 1911: 13,347
  - 1961: 13,146
- History
  - Created: 1894
  - Abolished: 1974
- Status: Rural district

Langport was a rural district in Somerset, England, from 1894 to 1974.

It was created in 1894 under the Local Government Act 1894.

In 1974 it was abolished under the Local Government Act 1972 to become part of South Somerset.

The parishes which used to be in the district include Aller, Babcary, Barrington, Barton St David, Beercrocombe, Charlton Mackrell, Compton Dundon, Curry Mallet, Curry Rivel, Drayton, Fivehead, Hambridge and Westport, High Ham, Huish Episcopi, Isle Abbots, Isle Brewers, Keinton Mandeville, Kingsbury Episcopi, Kingsdon, Kingweston, Langport, Long Sutton, Muchelney, Pitney, Puckington and Somerton.
