= Knowle St Giles =

Village and civil parish in Somerset, England

Coordinates: 50.899246°N 2.932789°W

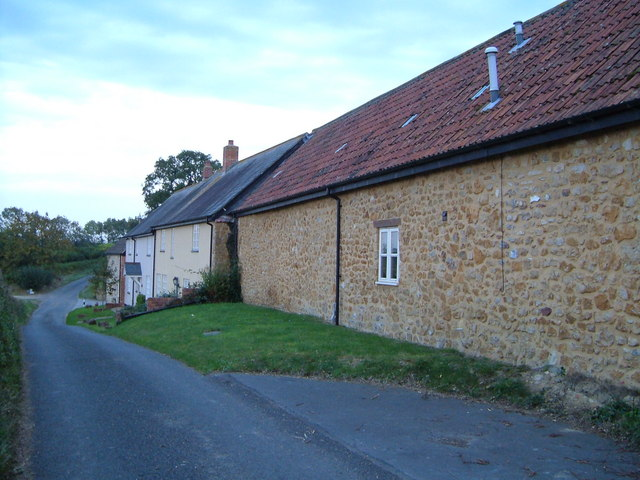
- Malherbie Court, Knowle St Giles

- Location within Somerset
- Population: 244 (2011)
- OS grid reference: ST345115
- Civil parish: Chard
- Unitary authority: Somerset Council
- Ceremonial county: Somerset
- Region: South West
- Country: England
- Sovereign state: United Kingdom
- Post town: CHARD
- Postcode district: TA20
- Dialling code: 01460
- Police: Avon and Somerset
- Fire: Devon and Somerset
- Ambulance: South Western
- UK Parliament: Yeovil

Knowle St Giles is a village and civil parish in the county of Somerset, England, situated on the River Isle 2 miles (3 km) south of Ilminster and 2.5 miles (4 km) north east of Chard. The village has a population of 244.

The parish includes the village of Cricket Malherbie.

== History ==
In the Domesday Book of 1086, Knowle St Giles is recorded as having small holdings by five villani and four bordarii. In the medieval period this grew with the reclamation of forest on Windwhistle Hill.

The parish of St Giles Knowles was part of the South Petherton Hundred.

== Governance ==
The parish council has responsibility for local issues, including evaluating local planning applications, initiating projects for the maintenance and repair of parish facilities, consulting with the district council on the maintenance and improvement of highways, drainage, footpaths and street cleaning, working with the police, district council and neighbourhood watch groups on crime, security and traffic, and assessing environmental and conservation matters such as trees and listed buildings.

For local government purposes, since 1 April 2023, the parish comes under the unitary authority of Somerset Council. Prior to this, it was part of the non-metropolitan district of South Somerset (established under the Local Government Act 1972). It was part of Chard Rural District before 1974.

It is also part of the Yeovil county constituency represented in the House of Commons of the Parliament of the United Kingdom. It elects one Member of Parliament (MP) by the first past the post system of election.

== Landmarks ==
Cricket Court was erected as a country house in 1811 for Admiral Stephen Pitt, his family being cousins of the Earl of Chatham.

The road bridge over the River Isle is a Grade II listed building.

== Religious sites ==
The former Church of St Giles is no longer consecrated and has been converted into a private house.

The Church of St Mary Magdalene in Cricket Malherbie, has 12th-century origins, but was rebuilt around 1855 by Rev J.M. Allen. It has been designated by English Heritage as a Grade II* listed building.
