= Misterton, Somerset =

Village and civil parish in Somerset, England

Coordinates: 50.8708°N 2.7764°W

Misterton
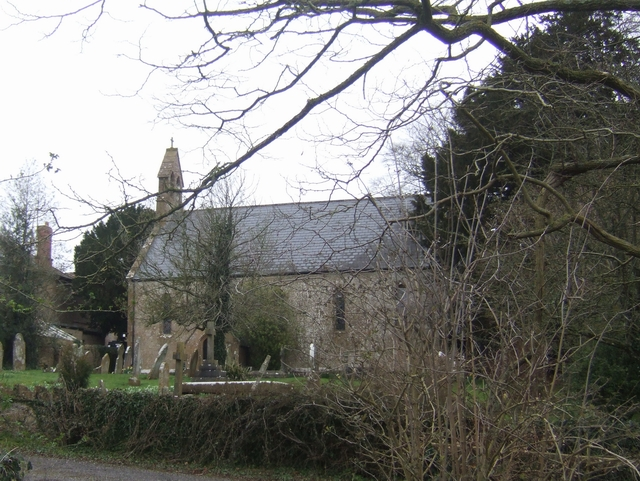
- Church of St Leonard, Misterton

- Location within Somerset
- Population: 826 (2011)
- OS grid reference: ST454082
- Civil parish: Misterton
- Unitary authority: Somerset Council
- Ceremonial county: Somerset
- Region: South West
- Country: England
- Sovereign state: United Kingdom
- Post town: CREWKERNE
- Postcode district: TA18
- Dialling code: 01460
- Police: Avon and Somerset
- Fire: Devon and Somerset
- Ambulance: South Western
- UK Parliament: Yeovil

Misterton is a village and civil parish 1 mile (1.6 km) south-east of Crewkerne, Somerset, England.

== History ==
The village was previously known as Minsterton as a result of its links with the "mother church" in Crewkerne.

The parish was part of the hundred of Crewkerne.

== Governance ==
The parish council has responsibility for local issues, including setting an annual precept (local rate) to cover the council's operating costs and producing annual accounts for public scrutiny. The parish council evaluates local planning applications and works with the local police, district council officers, and neighbourhood watch groups on matters of crime, security, and traffic. The parish council's role also includes initiating projects for the maintenance and repair of parish facilities, as well as consulting with the district council on the maintenance, repair, and improvement of highways, drainage, footpaths, public transport, and street cleaning. Conservation matters (including trees and listed buildings) and environmental issues are also the responsibility of the council.

For local government purposes, since 1 April 2023, the parish comes under the unitary authority of Somerset Council. Prior to this, it was part of the non-metropolitan district of South Somerset (established under the Local Government Act 1972). It was part of Chard Rural District before 1974.

It is also part of the Yeovil county constituency represented in the House of Commons of the Parliament of the United Kingdom. It elects one Member of Parliament (MP) by the first past the post system of election.

== Transport ==
The village is the site of Crewkerne railway station on the Exeter- London Waterloo line served by South West Trains. It also lies at the crossroads of the A356 and A3066 roads. The village is served by the Taunton-Chard-Crewkerne-Misterton-Yeovil bus service operated by Stagecoach and Bridport-Beaminster-Broadwindsor-Misterton-Crewkerne-Yeovil bus service operated by Damory. Both services operate Monday to Saturday.

== Landmarks ==
The manor house dates from the 18th century and was part of a major house which formerly incorporated Little Manor and West Manor.

The Old Court and Court Close, with Court Place and Old Court Cottage date from the 16th century and were two houses which were subsequently linked to form one and have now been extended and then subdivided again.

The Globe Inn dates from the 17th century.

== Religious sites ==
The Church of St Leonard was built of hamstone in 1840 by Sampson Kempthorne. It has been designated by English Heritage as a Grade II listed building.

== Notable residents ==
- Ellen Buckingham Mathews (1853 - 1920) an English novelist under the pen name Helen Mathers was born in the village.
