= Chillington, Somerset =

Village and civil parish in Somerset, England

Coordinates: 50.8958°N 2.8695°W

Chillington
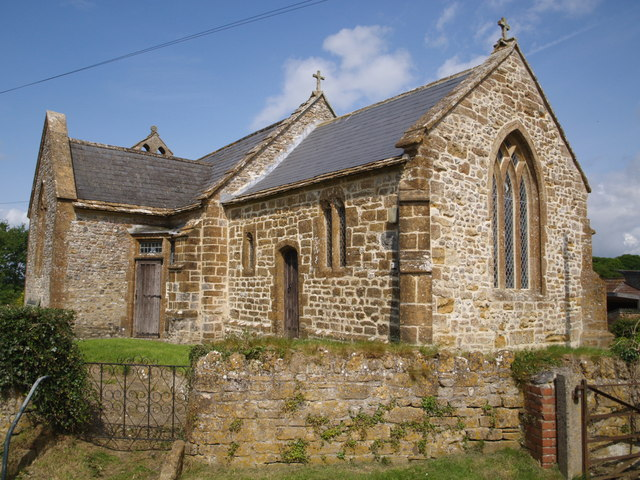
- St. James

- Location within Somerset
- Population: 164 (2011)
- OS grid reference: ST389110
- Civil parish: Crewkerne
- Unitary authority: Somerset Council
- Ceremonial county: Somerset
- Region: South West
- Country: England
- Sovereign state: United Kingdom
- Post town: ILMINSTER
- Postcode district: TA19
- Dialling code: 01460
- Police: Avon and Somerset
- Fire: Devon and Somerset
- Ambulance: South Western
- UK Parliament: Yeovil

Chillington is a village and parish in Somerset, England, situated 3 miles (5 km) west of Crewkerne and 5 miles (8 km) east of Chard. The parish has a population of 164.

== History ==
The name comes from Ceola's settlement. The parish of Chillington was part of the South Petherton Hundred. The manor passed in the mid 18th century to the Notley family who built the old manor house.

Higher Chillington was built in the 18th century around common land around Chillington Common.

== Governance ==
The parish council has responsibility for local issues, including setting an annual precept (local rate) to cover the council's operating costs and producing annual accounts for public scrutiny. The parish council evaluates local planning applications and works with the local police, district council officers, and neighbourhood watch groups on matters of crime, security, and traffic. The parish council's role also includes initiating projects for the maintenance and repair of parish facilities, as well as consulting with the district council on the maintenance, repair, and improvement of highways, drainage, footpaths, public transport, and street cleaning. Conservation matters (including trees and listed buildings) and environmental issues are also the responsibility of the council.

For local government purposes, since 1 April 2023, the parish comes under the unitary authority of Somerset Council. Prior to this, it was part of the non-metropolitan district of South Somerset (established under the Local Government Act 1972). It was part of Chard Rural District before 1974.

It is also part of the Yeovil county constituency represented in the House of Commons of the Parliament of the United Kingdom. It elects one Member of Parliament (MP) by the first past the post system of election.

== Religious sites ==
The older part of the village was Lower Chillington which was built around the Church of St James. The church has 13th-century origins, with modifications taking place in the early 14th and in the 15th centuries. It was restored in 1842 and 1909. The two bells were made by Thomas Bilbie of the Bilbie family.
