= Broadway, Somerset =

Village in Somerset, England

Coordinates: 50.9345°N 2.9673°W

Broadway
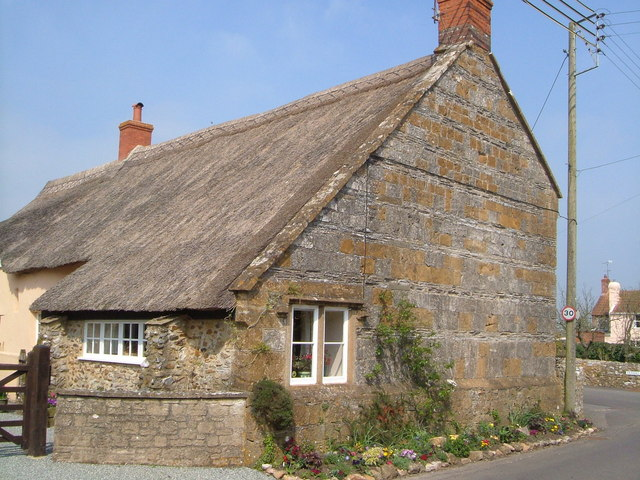
- Porch House

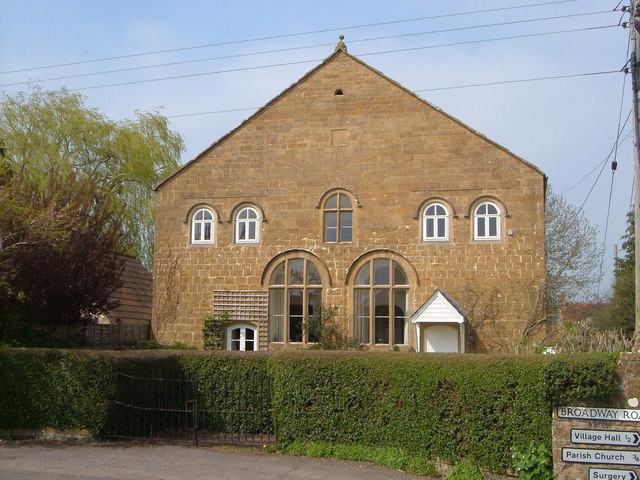
- Congregational Chapel

- Location within Somerset
- Population: 740 (2011)
- OS grid reference: ST321154
- Unitary authority: Somerset Council
- Ceremonial county: Somerset
- Region: South West
- Country: England
- Sovereign state: United Kingdom
- Post town: Ilminster
- Postcode district: TA19
- Dialling code: 01460
- Police: Avon and Somerset
- Fire: Devon and Somerset
- Ambulance: South Western
- UK Parliament: Yeovil

Broadway is a village and civil parish in Somerset, England, situated 3 miles (5 km) west of Ilminster and 5 miles (8 km) north of Chard. The parish has a population of 830 in 2021, up from 740 in 2011. The parish includes the nearby hamlet of Hare.

== History ==
In the Domesday Book of 1086, the village was known as Bradewei and located in ancient hundred of Abdick.

By the 14th century, Broadway was part of the hundred of Abdick and Bulstone. Broadway was known as Brodewaye in 1586.

Everys Almhouses date from the late 16th or early 17th century. They were founded after litigation over the 1558 will of Alexander Every.

The Tudor Cottage on Broadway Street was built as a farmhouse in the 16th century.

== Governance ==
As a civil parish, Broadway has a parish council with responsibility for local issues.

The village is in the Somerset unitary district, administered by Somerset Council. For elections to the council, it is in the Illminster electoral division.

Historically, Broadway was in Chard Rural District from 1894 to 1974, and in South Somerset district from 1974 until the creation of Somerset unitary district in 2023.

It is part of the Yeovil constituency represented in the House of Commons.

== Religious sites ==
The Church of St. Aldhelm and St. Eadburgha dates from the 13th century, and has been designated by English Heritage as a grade I listed building. Its isolated position away from the village is thought to be because of an outbreak of the plague. The churchyard cross is also from the 13th century.
