= Hambridge and Westport =

Civil parish in Somerset, England

Coordinates: 50.9897°N 2.8633°W

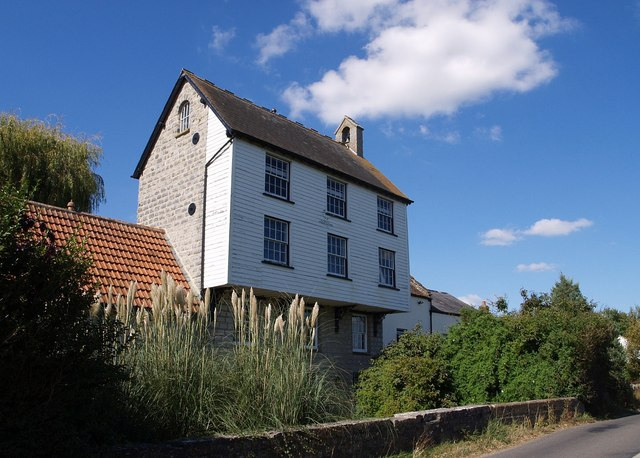
- Hambridge Mill House

- Location within Somerset
- Population: 514 (2011)
- OS grid reference: ST395215
- Unitary authority: Somerset Council
- Ceremonial county: Somerset
- Region: South West
- Country: England
- Sovereign state: United Kingdom
- Post town: Langport
- Postcode district: TA10
- Dialling code: 01460
- Police: Avon and Somerset
- Fire: Devon and Somerset
- Ambulance: South Western
- UK Parliament: Glastonbury and Somerton

Hambridge and Westport is a civil parish in Somerset, England. It had a population of 514 in 2011. The parish includes the villages of Hambridge and Westport.

== History and general information ==
Westport lies on the disused Westport Canal and Hambridge lies close to its junction with the River Isle.

Hambridge is most notable as the place at which Cecil Sharp was inspired by the Rev. Charles Marson, Vicar of Hambridge, to begin collecting folk songs.

The two villages, Hambridge and Westport share many resources including Parish Council, Church (the Church of St James the Less), Branch of the Royal British Legion and Recreation Trust who manage a recreation ground and Village Hall.

There is a thriving school and many additional clubs and societies use the Village Hall as a meeting venue. The Hall is often used for wedding receptions and for celebration events of all kinds. It has panoramic views across the Somerset Levels towards Burrow Hill.

== Governance ==
The parish council has responsibility for local issues, including setting an annual precept (local rate) to cover the council's operating costs and producing annual accounts for public scrutiny. The parish council evaluates local planning applications and works with the local police, district council officers, and neighbourhood watch groups on matters of crime, security, and traffic. The parish council's role also includes initiating projects for the maintenance and repair of parish facilities, as well as consulting with the district council on the maintenance, repair, and improvement of highways, drainage, footpaths, public transport, and street cleaning. Conservation matters (including trees and listed buildings) and environmental issues are also the responsibility of the council.

For local government purposes, since 1 April 2023, the parish comes under the unitary authority of Somerset Council. Prior to this, it was part of the non-metropolitan district of South Somerset (established under the Local Government Act 1972). It was part of Langport Rural District before 1974.

It is also part of the Glastonbury and Somerton county constituency represented in the House of Commons of the Parliament of the United Kingdom. It elects one Member of Parliament (MP) by the first past the post system of election.
