= Yeovil Rural District =

Former local government area in the UK

Coordinates: 50.955°N 2.649°W

- Area
  - 1911: 54,898 acres (222.16 km^{2})
  - 1961: 53,457
- Population
  - 1911: 16,457
  - 1961: 24,827
- History
  - Created: 1894
  - Abolished: 1974
- Status: Rural district

Yeovil was a rural district in Somerset, England, from 1894 to 1974.

It was created in 1894 under the Local Government Act 1894.

In 1974 it was abolished under the Local Government Act 1972 when it became part of Yeovil non-metropolitan district.

The parishes which were part of the district included Ash, Barwick, Brympton, Chilthorne Domer, Chilton Cantelo, Chiselborough, Closworth, East Chinnock, East Coker, Hardington Mandeville, Haselbury Plucknett, Ilchester, Limington, Long Load, Marston Magna, Martock, Montacute, Mudford, North Perrott, Norton Sub Hamdon, Odcombe, Rimpton, South Petherton, Stoke sub Hamdon, Tintinhull, West Camel, West Chinnock, West Coker, Yeovil Without and Yeovilton.
