= Chiselborough =

Village in Somerset, England

Coordinates: 50.9303°N 2.7558°W

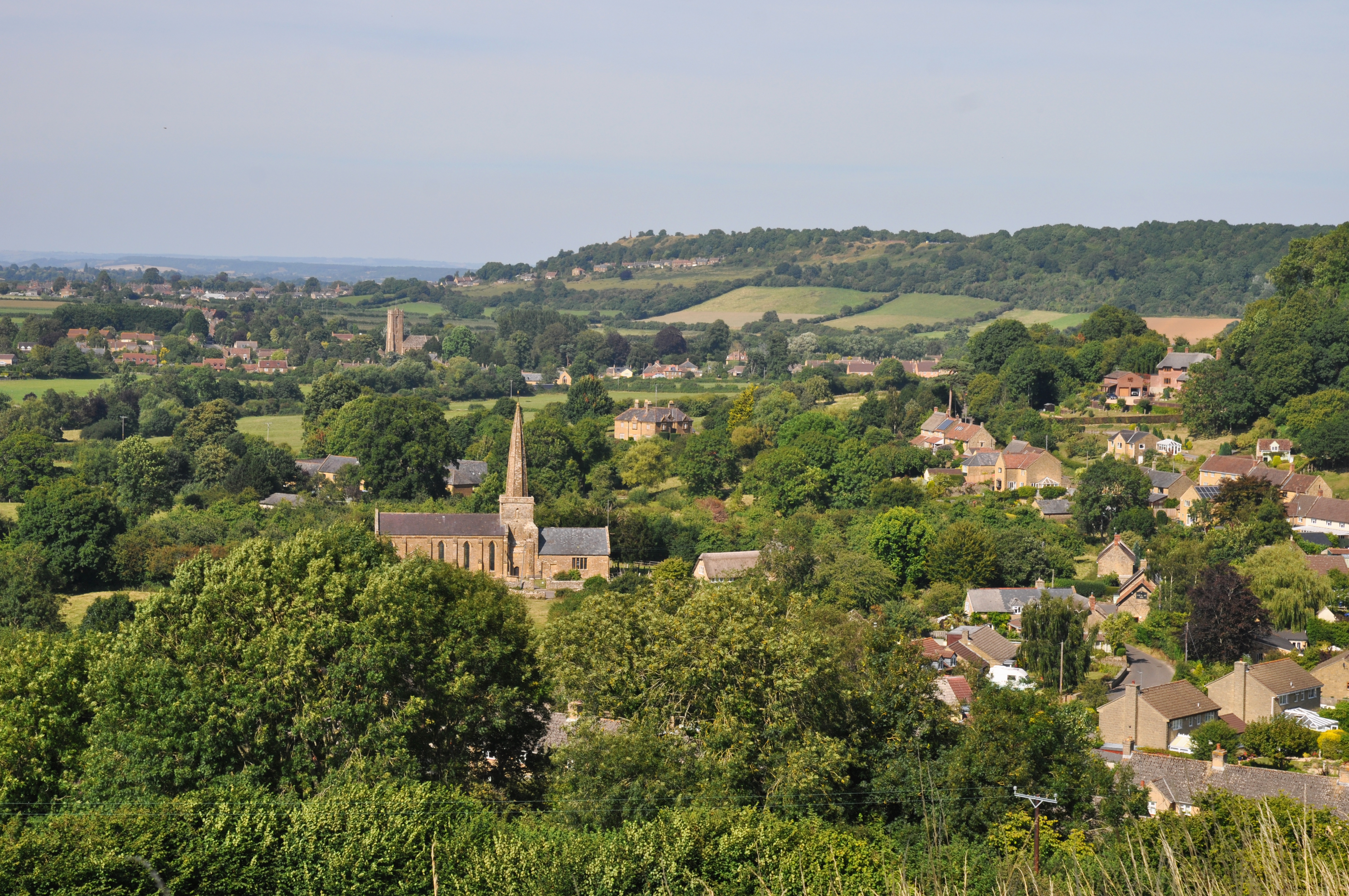
- Chiselborough seen from Balham Hill, with the parish church of Saint Peter and Saint Paul prominent on the left

- Location within Somerset
- Population: 275 (2011)
- OS grid reference: ST469148
- Unitary authority: Somerset Council
- Ceremonial county: Somerset
- Region: South West
- Country: England
- Sovereign state: United Kingdom
- Post town: STOKE-SUB-HAMDON
- Postcode district: TA14
- Dialling code: 01935
- Police: Avon and Somerset
- Fire: Devon and Somerset
- Ambulance: South Western
- UK Parliament: Yeovil

Chiselborough is a village in Somerset, England. It is situated on the River Parrett, 5 miles (8 km) west of Yeovil, and has a population of 275.

The village consists largely of small cottages built in the local golden hamstone quarried at the local Ham Hill.

== History ==
The village was recorded in Saxon times as 'Ceoselbergon' and was later mentioned in the Domesday Book as 'Ceolseberge' in the holding of Robert, Count of Mortain. The name derives from the Old English cisel and beorg (gravel and hill).

The parish was part of the hundred of Houndsborough.

The Earls of Ilchester held most of the village until 1914 when the estate was sold, having inherited it from the heirs of Joan Wadham, Lady Strangways, first wife of Sir Giles Strangways (1528–1562) of Melbury Sampford, sister and co-heiress of Nicholas Wadham, co-founder of Wadham College, Oxford. The current Baron and Baroness of Chiselborough do not reside in the area.

The annual Chiselborough Fair was held on common ground near the street now known as Fair Place.

== Governance ==
The parish council has responsibility for local issues, including setting an annual precept (local rate) to cover the council's operating costs and producing annual accounts for public scrutiny. The parish council evaluates local planning applications and works with the local police, district council officers, and neighbourhood watch groups on matters of crime, security, and traffic. The parish council's role also includes initiating projects for the maintenance and repair of parish facilities, as well as consulting with the district council on the maintenance, repair, and improvement of highways, drainage, footpaths, public transport, and street cleaning. Conservation matters (including trees and listed buildings) and environmental issues are also the responsibility of the council.

For local government purposes, since 1 April 2023, the parish comes under the unitary authority of Somerset Council. Prior to this, it was part of the non-metropolitan district of South Somerset (established under the Local Government Act 1972). It was part of Yeovil Rural District before 1974.

It is also part of the Yeovil county constituency represented in the House of Commons of the Parliament of the United Kingdom. It elects one Member of Parliament (MP) by the first past the post system of election.

== Geography ==
It is surrounded by five hills within the parish of the same name.

Geologically, the valley consists of a thin layer of Fuller's earth clay over Yeovil sands.

== Religious sites ==
The Anglican parish Church of St Peter and St Paul has 12th-century origins. The chancel dates from the 17th century and the nave was rebuilt by E L Bracebridge 1842. The current priest in charge is Rev. Nick Clarke.
