= Chard Rural District =

Former local government area in the UK

Coordinates: 50.873°N 2.959°W

- Area
  - 1911: 55,236
  - 1961: 54,599
- Population
  - 1911: 13,389
  - 1961: 12,207
- History
  - Created: 1894
  - Abolished: 1974
- Status: Rural district

Chard was a rural district in Somerset, England, from 1894 to 1974.

It was created in 1894 under the Local Government Act 1894.

In 1974 it was abolished under the Local Government Act 1972 when it became part of South Somerset.

The parishes that it included were: Ashill, Broadway, Buckland St Mary, Chaffcombe, Chillington, Combe St Nicholas, Cricket Malherbie, Cricket St Thomas, Cudworth, Dinnington, Donyatt, Dowlish Wake, Hinton St George, Ilminster, Ilminster Without, Ilton, Kingstone, Knowle St Giles, Lopen, Merriott, Misterton, Seavington St Mary, Seavington St Michael, Shepton Beauchamp, Stocklinch, Stocklinch Magdalen, Stocklinch Ottersey, Wambrook, Wayford, West Crewkerne, West Dowlish, Whitelackington, Whitestaunton and Winsham.
