= East Chinnock =

Village and civil parish in Somerset, England

Coordinates: 50.9187°N 2.7197°W

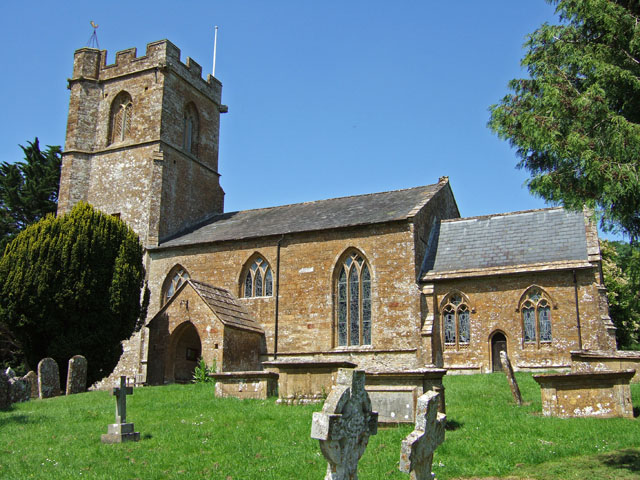
- The Church of Saint Mary in East Chinnock

- Location within Somerset
- Population: 479 (2011)
- OS grid reference: ST495135
- Unitary authority: Somerset Council
- Ceremonial county: Somerset
- Region: South West
- Country: England
- Sovereign state: United Kingdom
- Post town: YEOVIL
- Postcode district: BA22
- Dialling code: 01935
- Police: Avon and Somerset
- Fire: Devon and Somerset
- Ambulance: South Western
- UK Parliament: Yeovil

East Chinnock is a village and civil parish in Somerset, England, on the A30 road 4 miles (6.4 km) south west of Yeovil. The parish has a population of 479 (2011 census).

== History ==
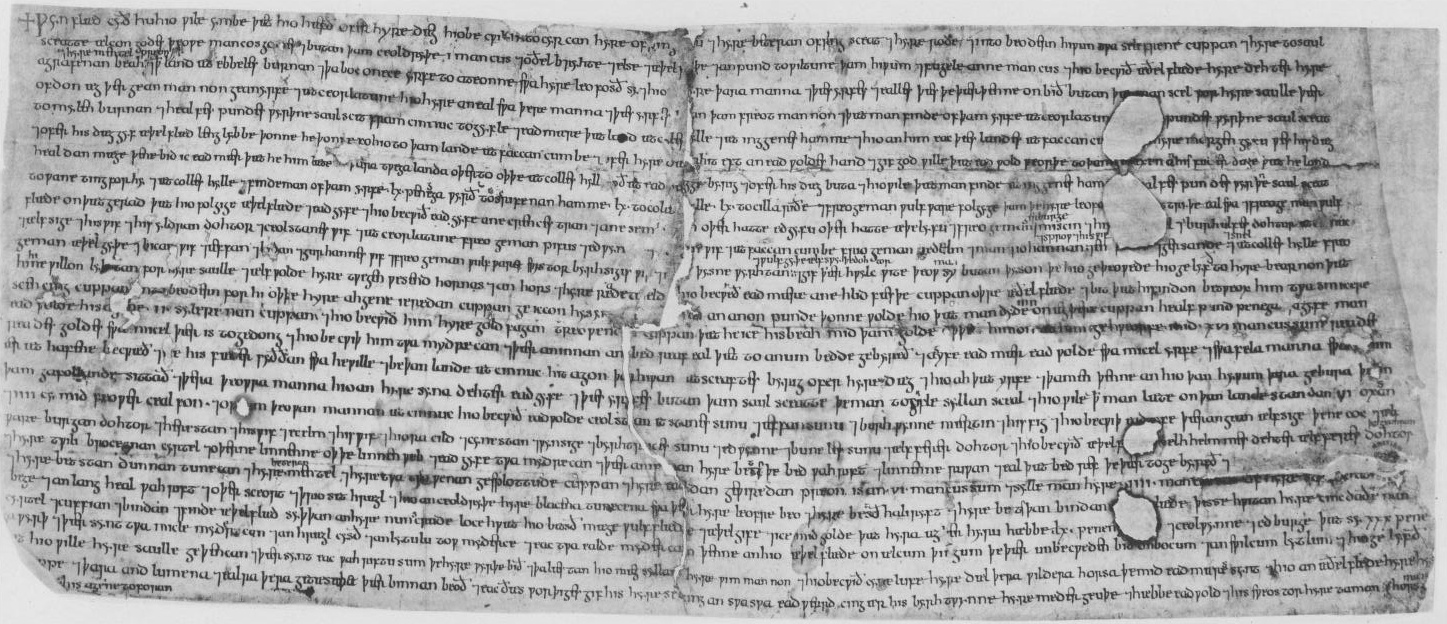
Will of Wynflæd, circa AD 950, mentions land at Cinnuc (11th-century copy, British Library Cotton Charters viii. 38)

The origin of the name Chinnock is uncertain. It may be derived from the Old English cinu meaning ravine or cinn meaning a chin shaped hill, with the addition of ock meaning little. An alternative derivation may be an old hill-name of Celtic origin.

The Chinnocks (later East, West and Middle) were in all but rectory in Saxon times lastly owned by Wynflaed under Shaftesbury Abbey but by the time of the Norman Conquest in 1066 East Chinnock was separated. It was granted to Robert, Count of Mortain and his son William gave it to Montacute Priory who held it until the dissolution of the monasteries in 1539, when it was bought by the Portmans of Orchard Portman.

== Governance ==
The parish council has co-responsibility for some local issues so sets an annual precept (local rate) to cover its costs and makes annual accounts for public scrutiny. It can submit its evaluation report into all planning applications and works with police, other councils' officers, and neighbourhood watch groups on matters of crime/security, traffic and highways. Conservation matters (including trees and listed buildings) and the environment can be in its reports and initiatives. It maintains and repairs some of, and consults with both higher-tier councils, as to more of, sports/leisure facilities, verges, parks, surface water drainage, paths, public transit and street cleaning.

For local government purposes, since 1 April 2023, the parish comes under the unitary authority of Somerset Council. Prior to this, it was part of the non-metropolitan district of South Somerset (established under the Local Government Act 1972). It was part of Yeovil Rural District before 1974.

It is served by the Yeovil seat in the House of Commons of the Parliament of the United Kingdom.

== Landmarks ==
Weston House in East Chinnock dates from 1637.

To the west of the village is a rare spring, of salt water, locally known as (the) Salt Hole. It was used for salt manufacture until the mid 19th century.

== Religious sites ==
The Church of Saint Mary in East Chinnock has 14th-century origins. Most of the stained glass of the nave and chancel was made by Gunther Anton, a prisoner of war in Yeovil during World War II, and dedicated by George Carey in 1989.

Its ecclesiastical parish is in a benefice that shares a cleric with three others. It is West Coker with Hardington Mandeville, East Chinnock and Pendomer.
