= List of Somerset towers =

The Somerset towers, church towers built in the 14th to 16th centuries, have been described as among England's finest contributions to medieval art. The paragraphs and descriptions below describe features of some of these towers. The organization follows Peter Poyntz-Wright's scheme for grouping the towers by what he understands to be roughly the date and group of mason-architects who built them. Poyntz-Wright's scheme came under criticism in the 1980s.

== Churchill generation ==
These churches have smaller towers with a single window in each face of the top stage; a pierced top parapet without merlons and four square-set corner pinnacles above.

Name of church	Photograph	Listed building grade	Year tower built	Height	Location	Description	Ref(s)
St John the Baptist		I	c. 1360 OR after 1420		Churchill; 51.3342°N 2.8001°W	The church was built around 1360. The tower has three stages with diagonal buttresses, moulded string courses, north-east polygonal higher corner stair turret with blind panelled embattled cap and pierced quatrefoil lozenge parapet with corner pinnacles and gargoyles.	
Church of St Michael the Archangel		I	c. 1370 OR 1443	70 feet (21 m)	Compton Martin; 51.310281°N 2.654161°W	Built around 1370 in a Norman style. It is dedicated to St Michael the Archangel. Norman vaulting can be seen in the chancel and Jacobean work in choir stalls and organ screen. The tower is approached from the nave via a lofty Tudor paneled arch. It contains six 18th-century bells, five of which were cast by the Bilbies of Chew Stoke. In the north wall is a recess containing the effigy of Thomas de Moreton which was discovered in 1858. One of the columns in the South side of the nave has an unusual spiral fluted decoration known as an apprentices column. Above the ceiling of the Bickfield Chapel there is a void which contains a columbarium or dovecote. This housed 140 "squabs" or pigeons in 1606 for the rector's table.	
Church of St Andrew		I	c. 1380		Compton Bishop; 51.2945°N 2.8676°W	The church dates from the 12th century, being consecrated by Bishop Jocelin in 1236, with more recent restoration in 1370. It has a 15th-century pulpit with tracery panels, carved friezes and cresting. Above the pulpit is a large pedimented wall monument to John Prowse who died in 1688, as well as several of his children.	
St Paul's		I	c. 1395		Kewstoke; 51.3655°N 2.957°W	The church dates from the 12th century. The tower is in two stages, with rendered, diagonal buttresses with setbacks which rise through the parapet as corner pinnacles. A polygonal stair turret at the south east corner rises to a pyramidal cap. The first stage has two, 2-light perpendicular west windows under a plain drip mould, and a similar but smaller window with carved stops to the south. The second stage has one 2-light perpendicular window under a drip mould with carved stops on each side; all are louvres except the west which is blank. A quatrefoil pierced parapet has gargoyles at the corner.	

== Cheddar generation ==
These churches have three windows in each face of the top stage; diagonal buttressing; some with squareset corner pinnacles; some with buttress pinnacles. These range from simple to elaborate designs: (Bleadon, shortly before 1390; Brent Knoll, about 1397; Mark, about 1407; Weare, about 1407; Banwell, about 1417; Cheddar, about 1423; and Winscombe, around 1435.)

Name of church	Photograph	Listed building grade	Year tower built	Height	Location	Description	Ref(s)
Church of St Andrew		I	c. 1417	100 feet (30 m)	Banwell; 51.3279°N 2.8633°W	The mainly 15th-century church includes a nave with a clerestory, north and south aisles and, a rather short chancel considering the proportions of the rest of the church. The high tower that contains 10 bells dating from the 18th to 20th century and a clock dated 1884. Bells dating from 1734 and 1742 were made by Thomas Bilbie, of the Bilbie family.	
Church of St. Peter and St. Paul	Square three stage stone tower. To the right is a building with a white wall and in the foreground a parked car.	I	c. 1390		Bleadon; 51.3075°N 2.9462°W	It was built in the 14th century (dedicated in 1317), being restored and the chancel shortened in the mid-19th century. The tower contains five bells dating from 1711 and made by Edward Bilbie of the Bilbie family.	
Church of St Michael		I	c. 1397		Brent Knoll; 51.252°N 2.9539°W	The church dates back to the 11th century but has undergone several renovations since then. The tower contains a bell dating from 1777 and made by William Bilbie of the Bilbie family.	
Church of St Andrew		I	c. 1423	100 feet (30 m)	Cheddar; 51.2737°N 2.7761°W	The church dates from the 14th century. It was restored in 1873 by William Butterfield. It contains some 15th-century stained glass and an altar table of 1631. The chest tomb in the chancel is believed to be to Sir Thomas Cheddar and dated 1442. The tower contains a bell dating from 1759 and made by Thomas Bilbie of the Bilbie family.	
Church of St Mark		I	c. 1407		Mark; 51.2262°N 2.8883°W	The Church of St Mark (or Holy Cross) dates from the 13th century, but is mainly 14th and 15th century, with further restoration in 1864.	
Church of St Gregory	Gray stone building with square tower	I	c. 1407		Weare; 51.2702°N 2.8413°W	Dates from the 11th century. In the churchyard is a 15th-century cross, and a 19th-century church room. In 1257 the church was granted to St Augustine's Abbey in Bristol and after the dissolution of the monasteries given to the dean and chapter of Bristol Cathedral.	
Church of St James		I	c. 1435	100 feet (30 m)	Winscombe; 51.3116°N 2.8342°W	The church has 12th- or 13th-century origins but the present building dates from the 15th century. There are no records remaining of the Norman church on the site, but there evidence of the building of the church which was consecrated by Bishop Jocelin on 26 August 1236. The 4-stage tower was added in the early 15th century by Bishop John Harewell, and at the same time stained glass was added. The church was restored and a new Chancel added in 1863. The bells of St James have long called people to worship, the original bells being cast in 1773 by local founders, the Bilbie family. Two newer bells were added in 1903 by Taylors Founders. The eight bells are in the key of E flat and the tenor weighs 18-1-8 – 18 hundredweight, 1 quarter of a hundredweight and 8 lb (930 kg).	

== Mendip generation ==
Continues with the triple windows, but with a heavier groundplan featuring heavier buttresses braced diagonally back onto their walls and across the corner; pinnacles diagonal to the tower plan: (Shepton Mallet, about 1423; Cranmore, about 1440; Mells, 1446; Bruton, about 1456; and Leigh-on-Mendip, about 1464)

Name of church	Photograph	Listed building grade	Year tower built	Height	Location	Description	Ref(s)
Church of St Mary		I	c. 1456	102 feet (31 m)	Bruton; 51.111667°N 2.451944°W	The Church of St Mary was built in the 14th century. Unusually, the church features two towers, a smaller and older north tower over the porch from the 14th century, and a much larger west tower from the 15th century, built of four stages. It is 102.5 feet high.	
Church of St Bartholomew		I	15th century		Cranmore; 51.1882°N 2.4761°W	Dates from the 15th century. It has a three-stage embattled tower, supported by buttresses with corner pinnacles, tracery and gargoyles. There is a stone fan vault under the tower.	
St Giles' church		I	c. 1464	94 feet (29 m)	Leigh-on-Mendip; 51.2239°N 2.4416°W	Dates from the 15th century and has an unusual faceless clock.	
St Andrew's Church		I	1446	104 feet (32 m)	Mells; 51.241928°N 2.390525°W	The church is predominantly from the late 15th century. The centre of the chapel is dominated by an equestrian statue to Edward Horner who fell at the Battle of Cambrai in 1917 by Sir Alfred Munnings. There is also a memorial, designed by Edwin Lutyens, to Raymond Asquith, who died in France in 1916. The churchyard is the last resting place of the poet Siegfried Sassoon and the writer Ronald Knox, among other notables.	
Church of St Peter and St Paul		I	c. 1423		Shepton Mallet; 51.191°N 2.5457°W	Dates from the 12th century, but the current building is largely from the 15th century, with further rebuilding in 1836. The timber roof includes 350 panels of different designs and 36 carved angels along the sides.	

== Winford generation ==
These churches are contemporary with the Mendip Generation, but more akin to the Churchill group; conveying a sense of great height; single window per face in the top stage as well as lower stages; buttresses set back away from the corners and stepped at stage junctions and middles of stages; square-set pinnacles and most without merlons: (Portishead, about 1420; Backwell, possibly 1428; Winford and Chew Magna, about 1437; Kilmersdon, about 1443; Dundry, 1448 or earlier; Batheaston, about 1458; Publow, about 1467; Wellow, about 1475; and Yeovil St. John the Baptist, around 1480)

Name of church	Photograph	Listed building grade	Year tower built	Height	Location	Description	Ref(s)
Church of St Andrew, Chew Magna	Stone building with square tower, partially obscured by trees	I	c. 1440	100 feet (30 m)	Chew Magna; 51.366667°N 2.609722°W	Dates from the 12th century, with a large 15th-century pinnacled sandstone tower, a Norman font and a rood screen that is the full width of the church. There has been a clock on the tower since the early 18th century. There is a peal of eight bells in the tower. Tenor 28cwt in C. The original five bells were re-cast by the celebrated Thomas Bilbie of Chew Stoke in 1735 to make a peal of six, and in 1898 four of these were re-cast and two were repaired by Messrs. Mears and Stainbank of London to commemorate the Diamond Jubilee of Queen Victoria. Two additional bells, the gift of Brigadier Ommanney, were added in 1928 to complete the octave, which does still contain two of the Bilbie bells. The present clock, installed in 1903, plays a verse of a hymn every four hours, at 8 am, noon, 4 and 8 pm, with a different hymn tune for every day of the week.	
Church of St Michael	Yellow stone church tower above other buildings of the same stone. In the foreground is a grassy field with cows.	I	c. 1448		Dundry; 51.399°N 2.6373°W	A prominent feature in its hilltop position with its tower visible for many miles around. The tower was erected by the Society of Merchant Venturers of Bristol as a landmark and is visible from many parts of Avon.	
Church of All Saints		I	c. 1467		Publow; 51.376111°N 2.542222°W	Dates from the 14th century and has a tower with gargoyles. The pulpit is Jacobean. The church consists of a west tower, nave, north aisle and porch, south aisle and porch, and chancel. The west tower has 4 stages with set back buttresses terminating in diagonally set pinnacles at the bell chamber stage. The nave has a clerestorey of four 2-light trefoil headed windows. The east end of the chancel has an early perpendicular (restored) 3-light window with reticulated tracery. The pulpit dates from the early 17th century, and is made of oak with carved, arcaded panels to the upper part and rosettes on the lower part.	
Church St Peter and St Paul		I	c. 1443		Kilmersdon; 51.2702°N 2.437°W	Dates back to the Norman Period, though much of the current structure was built during the Victorian era. The tower is in four stages, includes corner buttresses with shafts and pinnacles, and is connected across the angle. The summit has large corner shafts with pinnacles. There are traceried 3-light bell-chamber windows with a dense quatrefoil interlace and blank 2-light windows on the 2 lower stages. The flanked niches were for statuary, however this is now missing. The church has a triangular lychgate designed by Sir Edwin Lutyens.	
Church of St Julian		I	c. 1475		Wellow; 51.324444°N 2.3725°W	The church is dedicated to St. Julian and has origins before the 12th century although the present building dates from 1372. The west tower has three stages, set back buttresses with off-sets which turn into diagonal pinnacles in upper stages. There is an embattled parapet with pinnacles. The square stair turret on the south-east corner terminates as an octagon. There is a 3-light window to the bell chamber with cusped heads and a similar but larger window with transom to west.	
Church of St John The Baptist	Stone building with arched windows and square tower.	I	c. 1480	92 feet (28 m)	Yeovil; 50.941667°N 2.631389°W	Dates from the late 14th century. The tower is in 4-stages with set back offset corner buttresses. It is capped by openwork balustrading matching the parapets which are from the 19th century. There are two-light late-14th-century windows on all sides at bell-ringing and bell-chamber levels, the latter having fine pierced stonework grilles. There is a stair turret to the north-west corner, with a Weather vane termination. The tower contains two bells dating from 1728 and made by Thomas Bilbie. The "Great Bell" was recast from 4,502 pounds (2,042 kg; 321.6 st) to 4,992 lb (2,264 kg; 356.6 st).	
St John the Baptist with St Catherine		II*	c. 1458		Batheaston; 51.4065°N 2.3112°W	Built in the 12th century, and remodelled in the late 15th century. The west tower which has four stages with a pierced embattled parapet, setback buttresses, projecting octagonal stairs, and a turret at the south-east corner which terminates in spirelet, was rebuilt in 1834 by John Pinch the younger of Bath. It has pointed perpendicular 2-light windows with cusped heads and the east side has a canopied niche containing a figure, probably St. John.	
Church of St. Mary and St. Peter		II*	c. 1437		Winford; 51.3825°N 2.658056°W	Dates from the 15th Century. The 4-stage west tower has set back buttresses, moulded string courses and the north-east corner has a polygonal stair turret. Trefoil-headed open panel parapet with corner crocketted pinnacles and fine gargoyles. Top 3 stages have 2-light openings with hoodmoulds and lozenge stops, those below bell stage blind, those to bell stage louvred. 1st stage of west facade has deeply moulded pointed-arched doorway with 2-leaf doors and applied Gothick mouldings; light with intersecting tracery above. Above this a 3-light Gothick window.	

== Long panel generation ==
This group (including Wrington, about 1449; Wells St. Cuthbert, about 1456; and Evercreech, about 1462) -- window or bell-opening panels rise through several stages, emphasizing the towers' verticality.

Name of church	Photograph	Listed building grade	Year tower built	Height	Location	Description	Ref(s)
Church of St Peter		I	c. 1462	94 feet (29 m)	Evercreech; 51.1462°N 2.5027°W	Dates from the 14th century. The three-stage tower has set-back buttresses ascending to pinnacles, with a very tall transomed 2-light bell-chamber with windows on each face The embattled parapet has quatrefoil piercing, with big corner pinnacles and smaller intermediate pinnacles. The 4-light west window has extensively restored tracery. This tower is of the East Mendip type. On the north wall of the tower is a roll of honour to the victims of World War I. It is within a rectangular wooden case with a glazed door crowned by a triangular pediment and plaque below.	
Church of St. Cuthbert	Decorated and buttressed yellow stone tower.	I	c. 1456 OR 1561	151 feet (46 m)	Wells; 51.2068°N 2.6526°W	Often mistaken for the cathedral. It has a fine Somerset stone tower and a superb carved roof. Originally an Early English building (13th-century), it was much altered in the Perpendicular period (15th century). The tower is the third highest in Somerset. is of 3 stages, with the top stage occupying half the total height. Until 1561 the church had a central tower which either collapsed or was removed, and has been replaced with the current tower over the west door. Bells were cast for the tower by Roger Purdy.	
Church of All Saints		I	c. 1450	113.5 feet (35 m)	Wrington; 51.361°N 2.7658°W	The church has 13th-century foundations, and was remodelled with the addition of a west tower around 1450. It was restored in 1859 with further restoration to the tower in 1948. It includes stone busts to John Locke and Hannah More dating from the early 19th century on either side of the door. The chancel has gothic reredos by Charles Barry dating from 1832. The rood screen is from the 16th century. It has a tall 4-stage tower with set-back buttresses which develop into crocketted pinnacles at the top stage. The top displays moulded string courses and a trefoil pierced triangular parapet with gargoyles and corner pinnacles. According to Freeman it is "one of the "highest achievements of architectural genius". Wickham it dates from the period 1420 to 1450. The belfry stair is in the south east turret.	

== Langport generation ==
This group (including Langport, about 1455; Long Sutton, about 1462; Westonzoyland, about 1470; Muchelney, possibly 1468)

Name of church	Photograph	Listed building grade	Year tower built	Height	Location	Description	Ref(s)
Church of All Saints		I	c. 1455		Langport; 51.037222°N 2.825556°W	The in has 12th- or 13th-century origins. The square tower (with an octagonal stair-turret), which is in three stages, dates from the 15th century, although the top section was rebuilt in 1833. It has a number of interesting gargoyles known locally as 'hunky punks'. The church is no longer used for services and is in the care of the Churches Conservation Trust who have carried out extensive rebuilding work.	
Church of the Holy Trinity		I	c. 1462		Long Sutton; 51.032778°N 2.756389°W	Dates from 1493. An earlier church would have stood on this site from the 9th century or earlier. The current church was built of local lias stone cut and squared, with Ham stone dressings. It has stone slate roofs between stepped coped gabled with finials to the chancel and north porch. Internally, the chancel has a ceiled wagon-roof, with moulded ribs and plaster panels. The tower exhibits the tracery typical of Somerset churches. The under-tower space has a lierne vault, and a 15th-century octagonal font with quatrefoil panels. The tower has a ring of six bells, the tenor weighing 136 stone (864 kg).	
Church of St Peter and St Paul		I	c. 1468		Muchelney; 51.020556°N 2.815°W	St. Peter and St. Paul parish church, adjacent to Muchelney Abbey, has a ceiling enlivened with Jacobean paintings of bare-breasted angels, their nudity thought to symbolize innocent purity. It has a 3-stage tower supported by pairs of full-height corner buttresses. The south east octagonal stair turret leads to an outer door.	
St Mary's Parish Church	Stone building with square tower	I	c. 1470		Westonzoyland; 51.1087°N 2.9264°W	Has a 15th-century carved timber roof, served as a prison after the 1685 Battle of Sedgemoor. The 4 stage tower has an embattled parapet with quatrefoil arcading, and set-back buttresses which terminate in pinnacles on the bell-chamber stage.	

== Shepton Beauchamp generation ==
On these churches, each face of the top stage bears a window panel extending down into the stage below: (including Shepton Beauchamp, around 1477; Norton Sub Hamdon, around 1485; and Hinton St George, around 1492)

Name of church	Photograph	Listed building grade	Year tower built	Height	Location	Description	Ref(s)
St. Michael's church		I	c. 1477		Shepton Beauchamp; 50.950278°N 2.849167°W	Built of local Hamstone, and has 13th-century origins, although it has been extensively changed since then, with major renovation in 1865 by George Edmund Street. It has a tall 3-stage tower with set-back buttresses ascending to the shafts of former pinnacles, set off with an embattled parapet and gargoyles. There are 2-light traceried bell-chamber windows with stone grilles, continuing as blank openings on the ringing chamber below. There are clocks with Roman numerals to the west and south faces and a higher polygonal stair-turret to the north corner.	
Church of St Mary the Virgin	Yellow stone building with square tower.	I	c. 1485	98.5 feet (30 m)	Norton Sub Hamdon; 50.94°N 2.753611°W	Described as "An uncommonly perfect church" by Pevsner it has 13th-century origins, but was largely rebuilt between 1500 and 1510. Further restoration was undertaken by Henry Wilson in 1894 and 1904. The 5-stage tower was damaged by lightning and fire on 29 July 1894, but restored within a year preserving the original design. It has a double plinth, offset corner buttresses, dividing strings, battlemented parapet with pairs of corner pinnacles extended from buttresses, and central paired pinnacles with corbelled-off gargoyles.	
Church of St George	Stone building with arched windows and square tower. In the foreground are gravestones.	I	c. 1492		Hinton St George; 50.910833°N 2.827222°W	Includes 13th-century work by masons of Wells Cathedral. The vestry and north chapel of 1814 are said to be by James Wyatt, however it is more likely to be by Jeffry Wyatt, (later Sir Jeffry Wyattville). The 4-stage tower is dated to 1485–95. It is supported by full-height offset corner buttresses, and has battlemented parapets with quatrefoil panels below merlons on the corner and intermediate pinnacles. The weathervane was added in 1756 by Thomas Bagley of Bridgwater. There is a hexagonal south-east corner stair turret. Stage 2 has a small light on the north side and a statue niche on the south. All the faces on the two upper stages have 2-light, mullioned, transomed and traceried windows under pointed arched labels, with pierced stone baffles. The clockface is under the east window. During restoration work the parapet of the tower was examined and a stone was discovered with a carved date of 1731 which may suggest that the decorative parapet may have been added then. The tracery on the north side has been marked out but never cut. In general there is little sign of more than one phase of construction although repairs are evident.	

== Developmental/experimental ==
Lyng and Middlezoy (combining Langport, Cheddar and Mendip features with new features) and Taunton St. James and Bishops Lydeard (which initiate a West Somerset ground plan)

Name of church	Photograph	Listed building grade	Year tower built	Height	Location	Description	Ref(s)
Church of St Mary	Red stone building with square tower. In the foreground is a graveyard.	I	c. 1497		Bishops Lydeard; 51.0614°N 3.1872°W	Dates from the 14th and 15th century and in 1860–62 was extended by one bay and a vestry by Jeboult of Taunton. The tower has pierced tracery battlements, pinnacles, set-back buttresses terminating in pinnacles at the bell-storey, and pinnacles on the buttresses at each stage.	
Church of St Bartholomew		I	c. 1480		East Lyng; 51.0553°N 2.9537°W	Built by the monks who were displaced from Athelney Abbey when it was dissolved by King Henry VIII of England in 1539. The ornate three-stage tower is of lias with Ham stone dressings supported by set-back buttresses connected diagonally across the angles of the tower on the bottom 2 stages, these terminate as diagonal pinnacles on shafts at the third stage. The paired 2-light bell-chamber windows have Somerset tracery flanked by attached shafts and pinnacles, with quatrefoil grilles. There are similar single windows on the stage below.	
Church of the Holy Cross	Stone building with prominent square tower.	I	c. 1483		Middlezoy; 51.0939°N 2.8942°W	3-stage tower similar to that at Lyng.	
Church of St. James		II*	c. 1491	111 feet (34 m)	Taunton; 51.0177°N 3.1013°W	The oldest parts of St. James Church are early-14th-century, and there are fragments of 15th-century glass in the West end. The sandstone tower was rebuilt in the 19th century.. The church backs onto the Somerset County Ground and forms a familiar backdrop to the popular Cricket ground.	

== West Somerset generation ==
(Including Kingston St Mary, about 1507; Hatch Beauchamp, about 1509; Staple Fitzpaine, perhaps 1513; Isle Abbots, about 1517; Huish Episcopi, about 1524)

Name of church	Photograph	Listed building grade	Year tower built	Height	Location	Description	Ref(s)
Church of St John the Baptist	Gray stone building with square tower and slate roof.	I	c. 1509		Hatch Beauchamp; 50.9856°N 2.9902°W	A crenellated 3-stage tower. It displays crocketed pinnacles, a pierced parapet with quatrefoils and arcades in the merlons and gargoyles. This particular church has diagonal buttresses to support the tower whereas in other churches within this group angle buttresses are the norm. The buttresses, which finish in the belfry stage, support small detached shafts which rise upwards to form the outside subsidiary pinnacles of each corner cluster.	
Church of the Blessed Virgin Mary	Stone building with arched windows and square tower.	I	c. 1524	100 feet (30 m)	Huish Episcopi; 51.035833°N 2.818056°W	12th-century origins and also serves nearby Langport. Built in blue lias with golden hamstone decoration, the church is most noted for its classic Somerset tower, deemed to be an architectural companion piece to St. Martin's church in Kingsbury Episcopi. St Mary's tower dates from around 1500 and was built in 4 stages. It is extensively embellished with pinnacles and quatrefoil panel bands. In the north east corner is an octagonal stair turret which reaches the full height of the tower. The Huish Episcopi tower is depicted on the 9p stamp issued in June 1972.	
Church of St. Mary the Virgin	Stone building with arched window. Square tower surrounded by scaffolding.	I	c. 1517		Isle Abbots; 50.983889°N 2.9225°W	A tower of 4 stages. The embattled parapet is pierced by quatrefoils, the merlons pierced with lancet openings. The very large corner pinnacles have attached secondary pinnacles, and intermediate pinnacles to each side. The crocketted niches to each face of the tower have surviving medieval figures, to West the Risen Christ stepping from His sarcophagus, the Blessed Virgin with Bambino, St Peter and St Paul; to south St George, St Catherine, St Margaret; to east St John Baptist, St Clement; to north St Michael. The wealth of architectural detail and sculpture has required specific approaches to the methodology of repair and protection using lime-based materials.	
Church of St Mary	Gray stone building with ornate square tower and slate roof. In the foreground are gravestones	I	c. 1507	89 feet (27 m)	Kingston St Mary; 51.0615°N 3.1103°W	Dates from the 13th century, but the tower is from the early 16th century and was reroofed in 1952, with further restoration 1976–78. It is a 3-stage crenellated tower, with crocketed pinnacles with bracketed pinnacles set at angles, decorative pierced merlons, and set back buttresses crowned with pinnacles. The decorative "hunky-punks" are perched high on the corners. There may be so named because the carvings are squatting on their hunkers - as in one hunkers i.e. squatting and punch meaning short and thick. They actually serve no function unlike gargoyles which carry off water.	
Church of St Peter		I	c. 1513		Staple Fitzpaine; 50.9588°N 3.0496°W	Norman in origin, and has a Norman doorway reset in the south aisle. The chancel dates from the 14th century. The north aisle was added and the church refenestrated in the 15th century. The tower dates from about 1500, however the south porch and vestry are much more recent dating from 1841. The crenellated 3-stage tower, has merlons pierced with trefoil headed arches set on a quatrefoil pierced parapet. St. Peter's has six bells. The oldest dates from 1480. There are four more original bells. In 1803 one of the bells was made by Thomas Castleman Bilbie of Cullompton, one of the Bilbie family of bell founders and clock makers.	

== West Somerset specials ==
(Taunton St. Mary, about 1503, but rebuilt in 1862 as an accurate copy; North Petherton, about 1508; Wellington about 1510; and Kingsbury Episcopi, about 1515)

Name of church	Photograph	Listed building grade	Year tower built	Height	Location	Description	Ref(s)
Church of St Martin	Yellow stone building with square tower.	I	c. 1515	99 feet (30 m)	Kingsbury Episcopi; 50.985556°N 2.802778°W	This tower is made of stone from nearby Ham Hill. Pevsner describes the chancel and chapels of the church as "gloriously lit" and advises visiting on a fine morning. He writes that the nave is older than the rest of the church, "no doubt of before 1400, and not yet infected with the later exuberance" of the Late Perpendicular style of the tower and other parts of St. Martin's. Poyntz Wright suggests the west tower was built in 1515.	
St Mary the Virgin	Stone building with prominent square tower.	I	c. 1508	112 feet (34 m)	North Petherton; 51.0922°N 3.0148°W	This minster church has a highly decorated tower. The building is mainly dated from the 15th century, with a minstrel gallery from 1623, a peal of six bells, and a clock built in Bridgwater in 1807.	
Church of St. Mary Magdalene	Yellow stone building with arched windows and ornate square tower.	I	c. 1503	158 feet (48 m)	Taunton; 51.0163°N 3.1001°W	Built of sandstone more in the South Somerset style, preserves an attractive painted interior, but its most notable aspect is its 15th- and 16th-century tower (rebuilt in the mid-19th century), which is one of the best examples in the country. It was described by Simon Jenkins, an acknowledged authority on English churches, as "the finest in England. It makes its peace with the sky not just with a coronet but with the entire crown jewels cast in red-brown stone". The tower itself has 12 bells and a clock mechanism. Two of the hammers on the clock mechanism are not striking.	
Church of St John the Baptist		I	c. 1510		Wellington; 50.9788°N 3.2288°W	The 15th-century church includes a monument to John Popham.	

== South Somerset specials ==
These are some of the less elaborate towers of South Somerset: Queen Camel, around 1491; Mudford, about 1498; Kingsdon, about 1505; Martock, about 1511; Chard 1520, but possibly earlier; and Charlton Horethorne, about 1523.

Name of church	Photograph	Listed building grade	Year tower built	Height	Location	Description	Ref(s)
Church of St Mary the Virgin		I	c. 1520		Chard; 50.869167°N 2.963333°W	Dates from the late 11th century and was rebuilt in the 15th century. The tower contains two bells dating from the 1790s and made by Thomas Bilbie in Cullompton. The three-stage tower has moulded string courses and an angle stair turret in the north west corner.	
Church of St Barnabas	Stone building with square tower.	I	c. 1491		Queen Camel; 51.021944°N 2.573889°W	A tall tower, built in 5 stages.	
Church of All Saints	Stone building with square tower.	I	c. 1511		Martock; 50.969444°N 2.768889°W	Dates from the 13th century and was restored by Benjamin Ferrey who was Diocesan Architect to the Diocese of Bath and Wells from 1841 until his death, carrying out much of the restoration work on Wells Cathedral from 1860 onwards, and also in 1883/4 by Ewan Christian. The tower was built in four stages, to replace the previous one over the central crossing. It has offset corner buttresses to the full height of the tower.	
Church of Saint Mary	Stone building with square tower. In the foreground is a road.	I	c. 1498		Mudford; 50.976944°N 2.6075°W	A three-stage tower divided by string courses with clasping corner buttresses, a battlemented parapet with small corner and intermediate pinnacles, and corner gargoyles. There is a stair turret on the north-east corner with a weathervane finial, and a clock face on the east side. It contains five bells dated 1582, 1621, 1623, 1664 and 1666, all by Purdue family of nearby Closworth.	
Church of St Peter and St Paul	Stone building with square tower. In the foreground is a garssy area with gravestones.	II*	c. 1523		Charlton Horethorne; 51.0098°N 2.4788°W	The 12th century, acquired its two-stage tower in the late 15th century. It has offset corner buttresses almost to the full height of the tower with small crowning pinnacles.	
All Saints Church	Stone building with square tower.	II*	c. 1505		Kingsdon; 51.0358°N 2.693°W	A four-stage tower which was built in the 15th century, replacing a previous one over the north transept.	

== Somerset crossing towers ==
Perpendicular style, but built on the four arches at the intersection of the nave and chancel: Axbridge, about 1400; Wedmore base around 1400 and parapet about 1540; Yatton, around 1400; Dunster, 1442; Crewkerne, about 1480; Ilminster 1500 to 1525.

Name of church	Photograph	Listed building grade	Year tower built	Height	Location	Description	Ref(s)
Church of St John		I	c. 1400	100 feet (30 m)	Axbridge; 51.2877°N 2.8166°W	Church was built in the early 15th century, and grew from an earlier building dating back to about 1230. The church is built of limestone and decorated with Doulting stone, while the steps are an interesting example of dolomitic conglomerate, which is also known as (puddingstone). The elaborate crossing tower has set-back buttresses rising to pinnacles, and a parapet around the top stage pierced with quatrefoils. There are 2-light bell-chamber windows with a repeating blank window each side. On the east and west sides there are figures of St John and Henry VIII. It holds six bells, one of which dating from 1723 was made by Edward Bilbie. The statue on the east side is that of St John the Baptist. On the west side is a king — perhaps Henry VII, which would place it after 1485. The North aisle ceiling retains some mediaeval painted panels, and amongst the carved bosses is the head of a Green Man, with leaves sprouting around his face. The nave roof is Jacobean and dates from 1636.	
Church of St Bartholomew	Decorated yellow stone building with square tower.	I	c. 1480		Crewkerne; 50.881389°N 2.7925°W	Built in the 15th and early 16th century with earlier origins. The tower is in 3 stages with string-courses between. To the south-east corner, there is a hexagonal stair turret, which is slightly taller than the tower. In 1902, the clock, commemorating the coronation of Edward VII was installed replacing one made in 1802.	
Priory Church of St George		I	c. 1442		Dunster; 51.1824°N 3.4459°W	Predominantly 15th-century with evidence of 12th- and 13th-century work. It was restored in 1875–77 by George Edmund Street. The church has a cruciform plan with a central 4-stage tower, built in 1443 with diagonal buttresses, a stair turret and single bell-chamber windows.	
Church of St Mary	Elaborately ornamented stone building with square tower.	I	Between 1500 and 1525		Ilminster; 50.927222°N 2.911389°W	The large church, which is known as The Minster. The Hamstone building dates from the 15th century, but was refurbished in 1825 by William Burgess and the chancel restored 1883. The tower rises two storeys above the nave. It has three bays, with a stair turret to the north-west corner. The bays are articulated by slender buttresses with crocketed finials above the castellated parapet. Each bay on both stages contains a tall 2-light mullioned-and-transomed window with tracery. The lights to the top are filled with pierced stone-work, those to the base are solid. The stair turret has string courses coinciding with those on the tower, and a spirelet with a weathervane. The tower contains a bell dating from 1732 and made by Thomas Bilbie and another from 1790 made by William Biblie of the Bilbie family.	
Church of St Mary	Stone building with square tower	I	c. 1400		Wedmore; 51.2277°N 2.811°W	Predominantly from the 15th century, although some 12th- and 13th-century work survives. The tower with its set-back buttresses includes triple 2-light bell chamber windows; those to centre are louvred, those to each side blank.	
Church of St Mary		I	c. 1400		Yatton; 51.385°N 2.8185°W	Often called the 'Cathedral of the Moors' due to its size and grandeur in relation to the village. While the current church was constructed in the 14th century, it is likely that a previous Christian church was located on the same site. The tower has three stages with diagonal weathered buttresses with crocketed pinnacles. There is a south east hexagonal stair turret rising above the parapet with panelled sides to the top, and an open cusped parapet.	

== Other Somerset towers ==
Poyntz Wright also uses his systematics to date some small towers: Nempnett Thrubwell at around 1468; Chew Stoke about 1475; West Pennard at about 1482; Charlton Musgrove at perhaps around 1490; Pylle at about 1497; Cloford after 1500. He also pegs three of the smaller towers in the western part of Somerset: Combe Florey about 1499; Fivehead, around 1505; and Langford Budville, 1509. The end of the Perpendicular period in architecture coincides with construction of Ruishton, 1533; Chedzoy, 1539; and Batcombe and Chewton Mendip, around 1540.

Name of church	Photograph	Listed building grade	Year tower built	Height	Location	Description	Ref(s)
Church of St. Mary the Virgin		I	c. 1543		Batcombe; 51.1493°N 2.4439°W	Dates from the 15th and 16th centuries and was restored in the 19th. The tower contains five bells dating from 1760 and made by Thomas Bilbie in Cullompton.	
Church of St Mary		I	c. 1539		Chedzoy; 51.1345°N 2.9429°W	Dates from the 13th century. It still bears marks form the forces of The Duke of Monmouth during the Monmouth Rebellion who sharpened their swords before battle.	
Church of St Mary Magdalene	Stone two bay building with prominent ornamental tower behind	I	c. 1540	126 feet (38 m)	Chewton Mendip; 51.2761°N 2.5799°W	Made of Lias Stone, with a tower of Doulting Stone which was "unfinished" in 1541. The tower contains a bell dating from 1753 and made by Thomas Bilbie. In addition, there is a peal of eight bells by Taylor's of Loughborough. The church, which was started in 1441 by Carthusian monks, incorporates several Norman features including the north doorway. The register commences in the year 560. Near the altar is a stone seat, known as a 'frid' for those, especially criminals, who took sanctuary in the church. The church includes monuments to Sir Henry Fitzroger and his wife who died in 1388 and Frances Lady Waldegrave 1879. The Waldegrave family have owned Chewton from 1553, but did not live in the village until the 1860s. Wade and Wade in their 1929 book Somerset described the church as a "singularly interesting church, which possesses one of the most stately towers in the county".	
Church of St Martin		I	c. 1505		Fivehead; 51.001667°N 2.922778°W	Dates from the 13th century	
Church of St Peter		I	c. 1510		Langford Budville; 50.9988°N 3.2669°W	Dates from the 15th century.	
Church of St Nicholas	Gray stone building with arched windows and square tower. Foreground is grass with gravestones.	I	c. 1482		West Pennard; 51.1412°N 2.6397°W	Dates from the 15th century.	
St Andrews Church		II*	c. 1475		Chew Stoke; 51.3507°N 2.6383°W	Constructed in the 15th century and underwent extensive renovation in 1862. The inside of the church is decorated with 156 angels in wood and stone, and the church includes a tower with an unusual spirelet on the staircase turret. In the tower hang bells cast by the Bilbie family who lived and worked in the village.	
Church of St Mary	Gray stone building with tower at right hand end surmounted by a small spirelet, partially obscured by trees.	II*	c. 1468		Nempnett Thrubwell; 51.3379°N 2.6798°W	A tower containing five bells. The tower has set back buttresses and two arch bell openings with tracery. The tower is crowned by a parapet with blank arcading, and square pinnacles, it also has a slightly higher stair turret. The late Victorian chancel of 1897 is in the decorated style. Inside the church is a screen attributed to Pugin, although Pevsner is of the opinion the architect is probably Pugin the younger.	
Church of St Mary		II*	c. 1505		Cloford; 51.1944°N 2.3929°W	Norman church dates from the 15th century and was rebuilt in 1856.	
Church of St Thomas		II*	c. 1497		Pylle; 51.1443°N 2.564°W	Rebuilt in 1868 for the Portman family, but a 15th-century tower from the earlier church remains.	

== See also ==
- English Gothic architecture
- Towers in Somerset
