= Church of St John Baptist, Pitney =

Church in Somerset, England

Church of St John Baptist
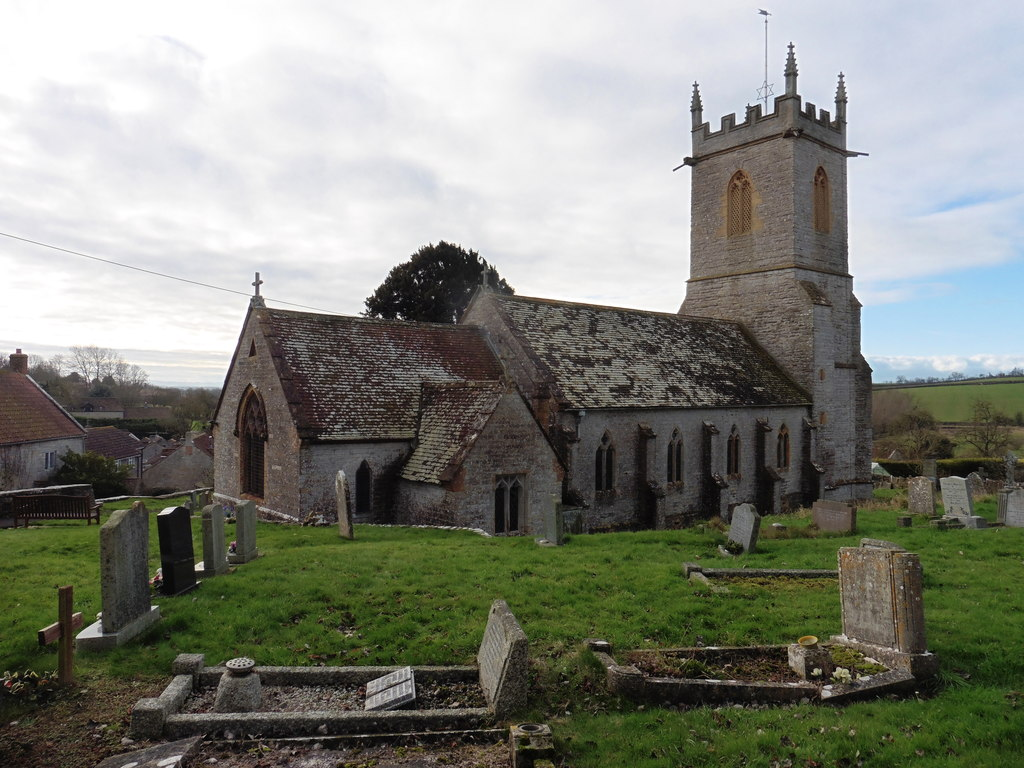

- Location within Somerset
- 51.0532°N 2.7937°W
- Location: Pitney, Somerset, England

History
- Built: 13th and 14th century

Listed Building – Grade II*
- Official name: Church of St John Baptist
- Designated: 17 April 1959
- Reference no.: 1056546

The Anglican Church of St John Baptist in Pitney, Somerset, England, was built in the 13th and 14th century. It is a Grade II* listed building.

== History ==
The church was built in the 13th century with the tower being added in the 14th. The church underwent Victorian restoration in 1853 and 1874 which involved rebuilding large parts of the building, including the removal of the west gallery. During the restoration work a Saxon bronze brooch was discovered, which is now in the British Museum and known as the "Pitney Brooch".

The parish is part of the benefice of Drayton, Long Sutton with Long Load, Muchelney and Pitney which is part of the Langport Team Ministry within the Diocese of Bath and Wells.

== Architecture ==
The stone building has hamstone dressing and clay tiled roofs. It consists of a four-bay nave and two-bay chancel with a south transept. The three-stage tower is supported by corner buttresses. The tower contains six bells. This includes two of which were replaced and additional bell added in 2014.

Most of the interior fittings are 19th century except the 17th century pulpit and lectern and 14th or 15th century font.

== See also ==
- List of ecclesiastical parishes in the Diocese of Bath and Wells
