= St Martin's Church, Kingsbury Episcopi =

Church in Somerset, England

Church of St Martin
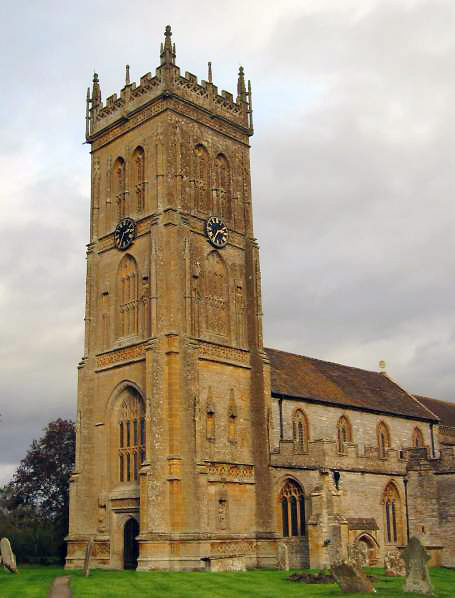

- Location within Somerset
- 50°59′08″N 2°48′10″W
- Location: Kingsbury Episcopi, Somerset, England

History
- Built: 14th century

Listed Building – Grade I
- Official name: Church of St Martin
- Designated: 17 April 1959
- Reference no.: 1056885

The Church of St Martin in Kingsbury Episcopi, Somerset, England, dates from the 14th century and has been designated as a Grade I listed building.

The church, dedicated to Saint Martin of Tours, stands on the site of an earlier Saxon church of which no trace remains and boasts an ornate Somerset Tower, 99 feet (30 m) tall, made of stone from nearby Ham Hill. There is a four-bay aisled nave. Pevsner describes the chancel and chapels of the church as "gloriously lit" and advises visiting on a fine morning. He writes that the nave is older than the rest of the church, "no doubt of before 1400, and not yet infected with the later exuberance" of the Late Perpendicular style of the tower and other parts of St Martin's. Poyntz Wright suggests the 100 feet (30 m) high west tower was built in 1515.

The four-stage tower is supported by buttresses and has bands of blank quatrefoils, and is surmounted by battlements with pinnacles.

The church was renovated between 1845 and 1849.

The parish is part of the benefice of Kingsbury Episcopi, East Lambrook and Hambridge within the deanery of Crewkerne and Ilminster.

== See also ==
- Grade I listed buildings in South Somerset
- List of Somerset towers
- List of ecclesiastical parishes in the Diocese of Bath and Wells
