= Kingsbury Episcopi =

Village and civil parish in Somerset, England

Coordinates: 50.9852°N 2.8088°W

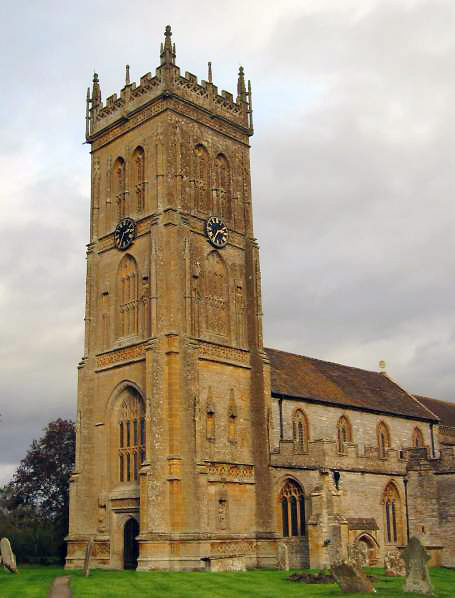
- The west tower of St Martin's, Kingsbury Episcopi

- Location within Somerset
- Population: 1,307 (2011)
- OS grid reference: ST433209
- Unitary authority: Somerset Council
- Ceremonial county: Somerset
- Region: South West
- Country: England
- Sovereign state: United Kingdom
- Post town: MARTOCK
- Postcode district: TA12
- Dialling code: 01935
- Police: Avon and Somerset
- Fire: Devon and Somerset
- Ambulance: South Western
- UK Parliament: Glastonbury and Somerton

Kingsbury Episcopi is a village and civil parish on the River Parrett in Somerset, England, situated 9 miles (14.5 km) north west of Yeovil. The village has a population of 1,307. The parish includes the villages of West Lambrook, East Lambrook and Thorney.

== History ==
The "Episcopi" part of the village's name means "of the Bishop" in Latin. It refers to the fact that the village belonged to the Bishop of Bath and Wells and not the nearby abbey at Muchelney.

The parish was part of the Kingsbury Hundred,

Thorney suffered serious flooding during the Winter flooding of 2013–14 on the Somerset Levels.

== Governance ==
For local government purposes, since 1 April 2023, the parish comes under the unitary authority of Somerset Council. Prior to this, it was part of the non-metropolitan district of South Somerset (established under the Local Government Act 1972). It was part of Langport Rural District from 1894 to 1974.

The village falls within the Curry Rivel and Langport electoral division for elections to Somerset Council.

It is also part of the Glastonbury and Somerton constituency represented in the House of Commons of the Parliament of the United Kingdom.

== Landmarks ==
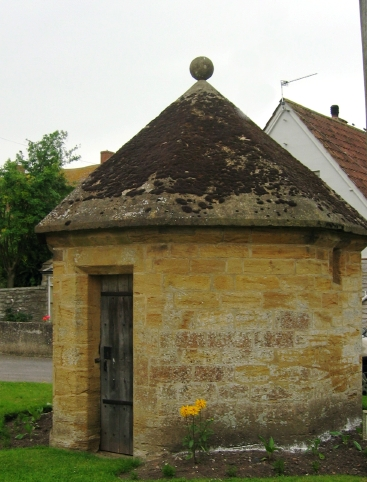
The lock-up, Kingsbury Episcopi

Other historic buildings in the village include many old houses, a public house called the Wyndham Arms, a Wesleyan church and an octagonal village lock-up that was used to detain drunks and suspected criminals.

The East Lambrook Manor dates from the 15th century. It has been designated by English Heritage as a Grade II* listed building. The garden was planted by Margery Fish from 1938 until her death in 1969. She wrote several books on cottage gardens and held the National Collection of Geraniums, and a collection of snowdrops.

== Religious sites ==
Kingsbury Episcopi's church of St Martin boasts an ornate Somerset Tower, 99 feet (30 m) tall, made of stone from nearby Ham Hill. Pevsner describes the chancel and chapels of the church as "gloriously lit" and advises visiting on a fine morning. He writes that the nave is older than the rest of the church, "no doubt of before 1400, and not yet infected with the later exuberance" of the Late Perpendicular style of the tower and other parts of St Martin's. Poyntz Wright suggests the west tower was built in 1515. It has been designated by English Heritage as a Grade I listed building.

The church of St James in East Lambrook dates from the 12th century.

== Culture ==
Kingsbury is known for its May Festival which is held on the May Day Bank Holiday and attracts over 4,000 visitors. Another popular attraction is the Lowland Games, where events include mud wrestling, river raft racing and bale racing, while locally brewed cider is available.

Other nearby places of interest include the Burrow Hill Cider Farm.

The mid-summer Lowland Games have been held near the village of Thorney annually since 1984.

The River Parrett Trail, a walking route that follows the course of the river, passes through the village.
