= Church of St Peter and St Paul, Muchelney =

Church in Somerset, England

Church of St Peter and St Paul
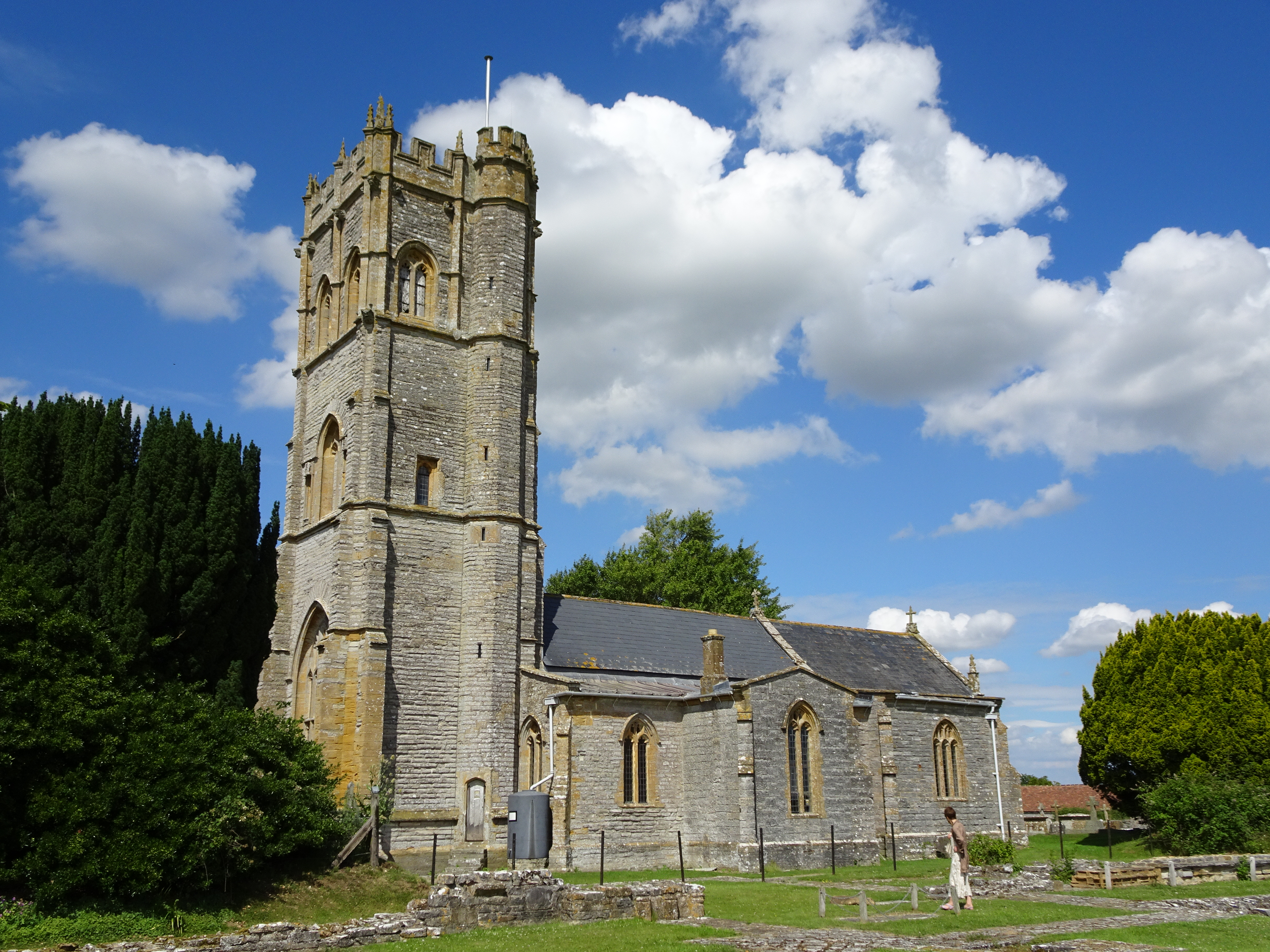

- Location within Somerset
- 51°01′14″N 2°48′54″W
- Location: Muchelney, Somerset, England

History
- Built: 15th century

Listed Building – Grade I
- Official name: Church of Saint Peter and Saint Paul
- Designated: 17 April 1959
- Reference no.: 1247849

The Church of St Peter and St Paul in Muchelney, Somerset, England, has Saxon origins, however the current building largely dates from the 15th century. It has been designated as a Grade I listed building.

The church, which is adjacent to the site of Muchelney Abbey and close to the River Parrett, has a ceiling enlivened with Jacobean paintings of bare-breasted angels, their nudity thought to symbolize innocent purity. They were painted in the early 17th century.

The church also contains a barrel organ built by Gray and Davison and installed around 1835 to 1840. It is the last one known to be still in the church where it was first installed and still in working order.

There is a three-bay aisled nave and a chancel with a short chapel on either side.

It has a three-stage Somerset tower, dating from around 1468, supported by pairs of full-height corner buttresses. The south-east octagonal stair turret leads to an outer door.

The parish is part of the Langport Area Team Ministry benefice within the Ilchester deanery of the Diocese of Bath and Wells.

== See also ==
- Grade I listed buildings in South Somerset
- List of Somerset towers
- List of ecclesiastical parishes in the Diocese of Bath and Wells
