= St Mary's Church, Kingston St Mary =

Church in Somerset, England

Church of St Mary
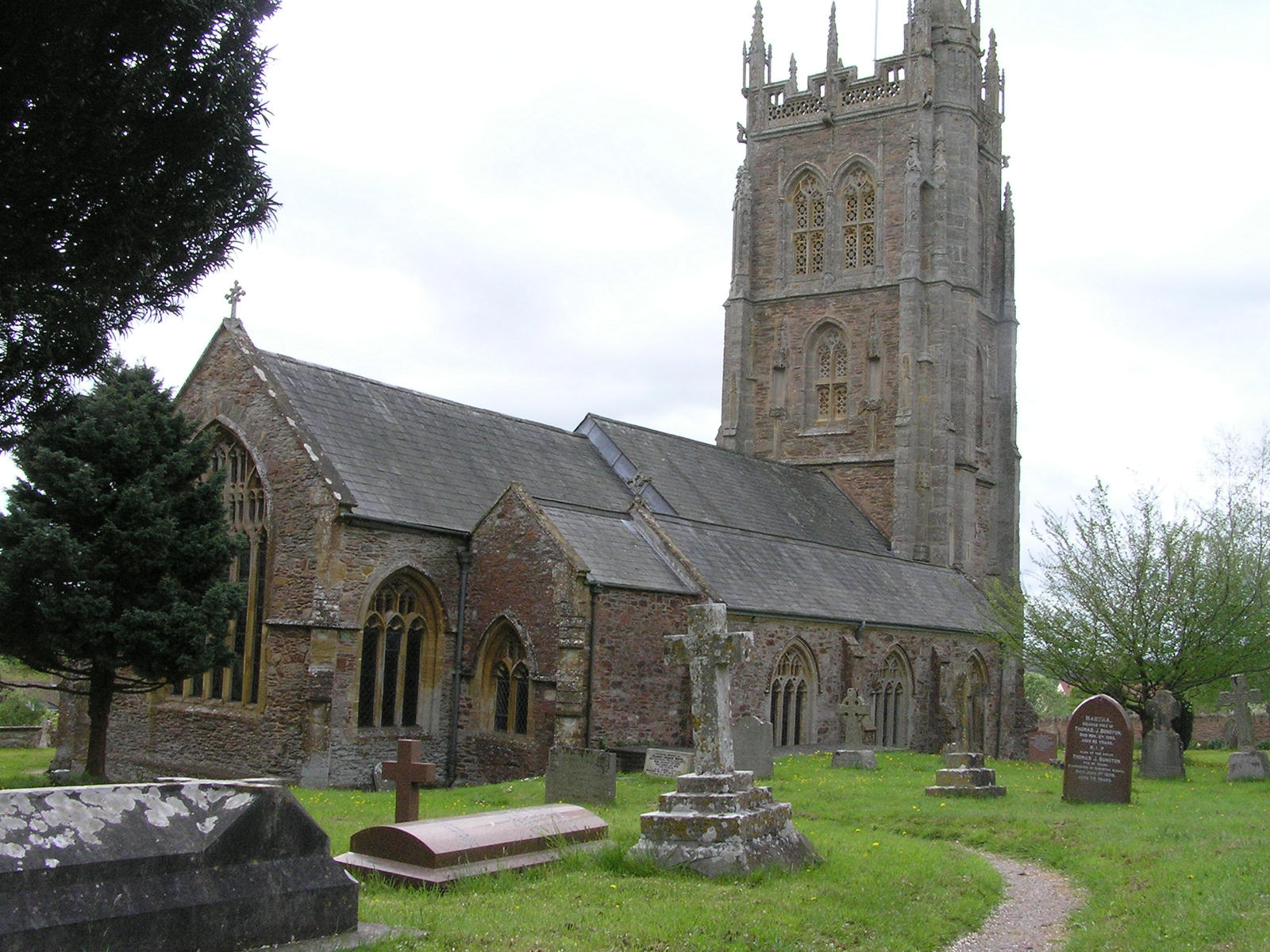

- Location within Somerset

General information
- Location: Kingston St Mary, England
- Coordinates: 51.0615°N 3.1103°W
- Completed: 13th century

The Church of St Mary in Kingston St Mary, Somerset, England, dates from the 13th century and has been designated as a Grade I listed building.

The nave and arcades date from the 13th century. The tower is from the early 16th century and was reroofed in 1952, with further restoration 1976–1978. It is a 3-stage crenellated tower, with crocketed pinnacles with bracketed pinnacles set at angles, decorative pierced merlons, and set back buttresses crowned with pinnacles. The decorative "hunky punks" are perched high on the corners. There may be so named because the carvings are squatting on their hunkers – as in one hunkers i.e. squatting and punch meaning short and thick. They actually serve no function unlike gargoyles which carry off water. The tower, including pinnacles, is 89 feet (27 metres) high.

The interior of the church includes a font from the 16th century, and the pulpit from 1742. The carved bench ends date from the 1520s. The tomb of John de la Warre the 4th Earl De La Warr, who fought at the Battle of Poitiers in 1356, is made from Purbeck Marble and dominates the south aisle. It includes a wide selection of stained glass.

The churchyard includes tombs of the Warre family who owned nearby Hestercombe House.

The parish is part of the benefice of Kingston St Mary with Broomfield within the Taunton deanery.

== See also ==
- List of Grade I listed buildings in Taunton Deane
- List of towers in Somerset
- List of ecclesiastical parishes in the Diocese of Bath and Wells
