= Wet Moor =

Protected area in Somerset, England

- Site of Special Scientific Interest
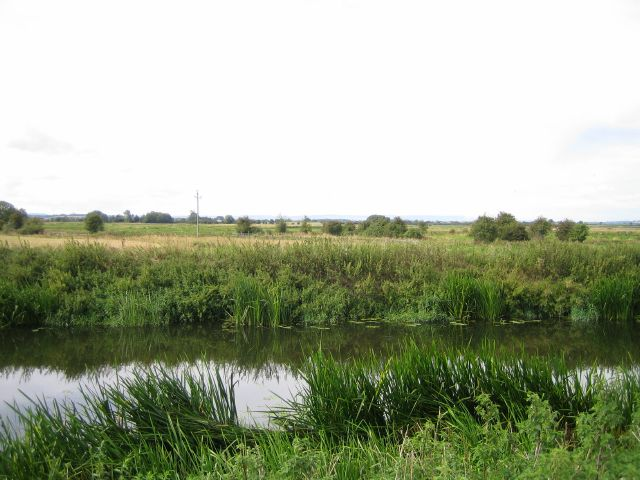

- Location within Somerset
- Location of Wet Moor.
- Area of search: Somerset
- Grid reference: ST448244
- Coordinates: 51.01631°N 2.78830°W
- Interest: Biological
- Area: 491 hectares (4.91 km^{2}; 1.90 sq mi)
- Notification date: 1985

Wet Moor (grid reference ST448244) is a 491.0-hectare (1214.0 acre) biological Site of Special Scientific Interest east of Muchelney in Somerset, notified in 1985.

Wet Moor is part of the extensive grazing marsh grasslands and ditch systems of the Somerset Levels and Moors.

Wet Moor is low-lying, low-relief land typical in character of the Somerset Moors and Levels. The landscape is dominated by two major arterial watercourses, the Rivers Parrett and Yeo. These are large embanked channels which act as upland water carriers conveying water from the upstream catchments through the low moor lands. In storm conditions the rivers can surcharge their banks and overspill into the adjacent low-lying moorland. Here, flood waters are retained until river levels recede below bankfull conditions. The rivers running through the moor make home for many wildlife, including wintering whooper swans.
