= Pitney =

Village and civil parish in Somerset, England

Coordinates: 51.0519°N 2.7891°W

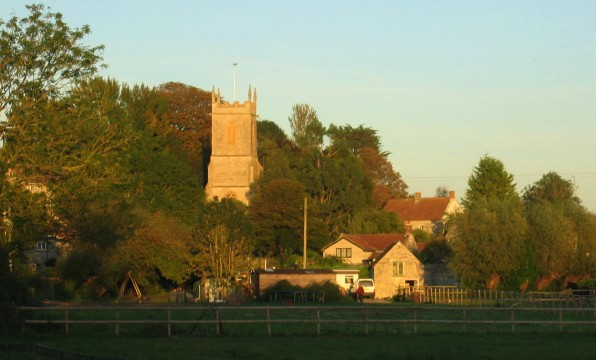
- Sunset rays catch the tower of St John the Baptist Church

- Location within Somerset
- Population: 374
- OS grid reference: ST455285
- Unitary authority: Somerset Council
- Ceremonial county: Somerset
- Region: South West
- Country: England
- Sovereign state: United Kingdom
- Post town: Langport
- Postcode district: TA10
- Dialling code: 01458
- Police: Avon and Somerset
- Fire: Devon and Somerset
- Ambulance: South Western
- UK Parliament: Glastonbury and Somerton

Pitney is a village and parish in Somerset, England, located 2.5 miles (4.0 km) east of Langport and 3 miles (4.8 km) west of Somerton. In 2011, the village had a population of 374. Pitney is home to St John the Baptist Church.

== History ==
The name means "Pytta's place" from Pytta the Saxon, however there is evidence of much earlier occupation from a Bronze Age sword dating from 200 BC found on Pitney Moor. It was recorded in the Domesday Book as Petenie supporting the alternative meaning of 'the traversing stream' from the Old English pæþþan and ea.

Several significant archaeological finds have been made at Pitney, including the remains of a Roman villa (roof tiles, pottery, and mosaic) uncovered in the 19th century, and the Pitney brooch, a Saxon cast bronze openwork brooch, modelled after a late Viking design and now in the British Museum.

The medieval manors originated in grants made to Richard Rivel (of Curry Rivel) from the Royal manor of Somerton between 1190 and 1003. The parish was part of the Pitney Hundred. Pitney Warne manor was granted to the Compton family in 1610 and split up and sold by their descendant the Duke of Devonshire in 1919. The lesser manor of Pitney Lortie was held by the Pyne family; the manor house may be the building now known as The Old Court, which has its origins prior to the 16th century.

The 1848 publication, A Topographical Dictionary of England, describes Pitney as an agricultural village of 465 people and writes of the Roman villa:

At this place has been discovered perhaps the most perfect pavement of an ancient villa yet found in England; the ruins cover about an acre and a half of ground, and the remains of the mosaics show the former splendour of the buildings. In the principal apartment are four pavements of great beauty, with nine figures in good preservation, and four well-drawn busts; in another room is the figure of a youth striking a serpent. The late Sir Richard C. Hoare, who had the subjects illustrated by engravings, supposes, from the English costume of the chief figures, that the villa belonged to the lord of the manor, and was not raised till after the departure of the Romans.

== Governance ==
The parish council has responsibility for local issues, including setting an annual precept (local rate) to cover the council's operating costs and producing annual accounts for public scrutiny. The parish council evaluates local planning applications and works with the local police, district council officers, and neighbourhood watch groups on matters of crime, security, and traffic. The parish council's role also includes initiating projects for the maintenance and repair of parish facilities, as well as consulting with the district council on the maintenance, repair, and improvement of highways, drainage, footpaths, public transport, and street cleaning. Conservation matters (including trees and listed buildings) and environmental issues are also the responsibility of the council.

For local government purposes, since 1 April 2023, the parish comes under the unitary authority of Somerset Council. Prior to this, it was part of the non-metropolitan district of South Somerset (established under the Local Government Act 1972). It was part of Langport Rural District before 1974.

It is also part of the Glastonbury and Somerton county constituency represented in the House of Commons of the Parliament of the United Kingdom. It elects one Member of Parliament (MP) by the first past the post system of election.

== Religious sites ==
Pitney's church is dedicated to St John the Baptist. The west tower and south doorway to the nave date to the 14th century, with other parts from the 15th century. The chancel was restored in 1853, with additional restoration to the church in 1875. It was a daughter chapel to Huish Episcopi. It has been designated by English Heritage as a Grade II* listed building.
