= Church of the Holy Trinity, Long Sutton =

Church in Somerset, England

Church of the Holy Trinity
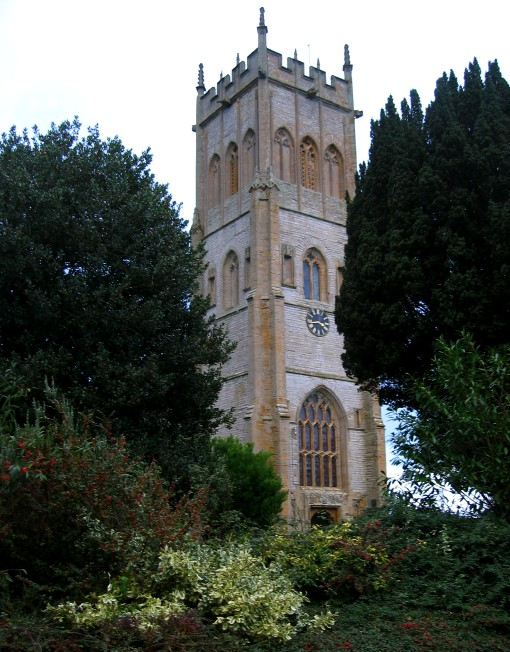

- Location within Somerset
- 51°01′58″N 2°45′23″W
- Location: Long Sutton, Somerset, England

History
- Built: 15th century

Listed Building – Grade I
- Official name: Church of the Holy Trinity
- Designated: 17 February 1986
- Reference no.: 1236060

The Church of the Holy Trinity in Long Sutton, Somerset, England dates from the 15th century and has been designated as a Grade I listed building.

An earlier church would have stood on this site from the 9th century or earlier. The current church, which was consecrated in 1493, was built of local lias stone cut and squared, with hamstone dressings. It has stone slate roofs between stepped coped gabled with finials to the chancel and north porch. The tower, which dates from around 1462, has a ring of six bells, the tenor weighing 136 stone (864 kg). On the corner plates of the tower are hunky punks in the shape of daemonic animals.

Internally, the chancel has a ceiled wagon-roof, with moulded ribs and plaster panels. The tower exhibits the tracery typical of Somerset churches. The under-tower space has a lierne vault, and a 15th-century octagonal font with quatrefoil panels.

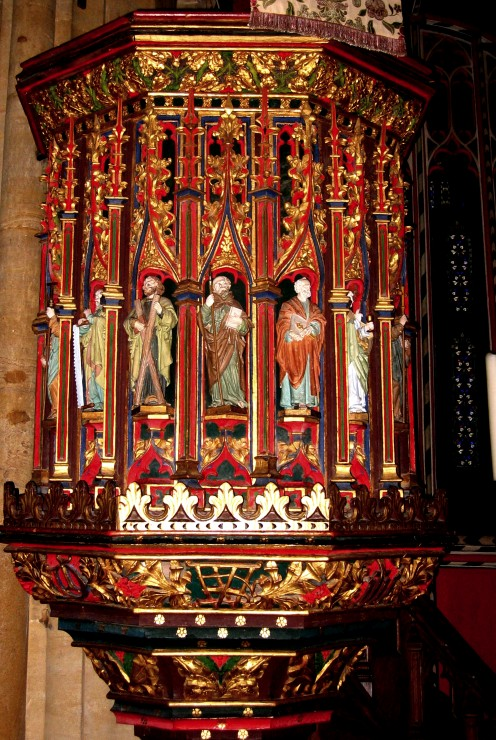
The painted pulpit

The coloured timber pulpit, with a fly approach stair, dates from 1455 to 1458 and is older than the church itself. It has 20th-century wood figures in the statue niches. It bears the initials identified as those of Abbot John Petherton of Althelney and vicar William Singleton.

The wood screen is also ornately carved and dates from the late 15th century. Memorials in the church include a tablet to Elizabeth Banbury, died 1716, with Corinthian columns and entablature, side and bottom swags, as well as a number of 16th- and 17th-century Keinton stone slabs in the floor.

== See also ==
- List of Grade I listed buildings in South Somerset
- List of towers in Somerset
- List of ecclesiastical parishes in the Diocese of Bath and Wells
