= Pitney Hundred =

Historical Hundred of Somerset, England

- Area
- 3,690 acres (1,490 ha)
- Status: Hundred
  - HQ: Pitney
- Subdivisions
  - Type: Parishes
  - Units: Langport Eastover, Muchelney, and Pitney

The Hundred of Pitney is one of the 40 historical Hundreds in the ceremonial county of Somerset, England, dating from before the Norman conquest during the Anglo-Saxon era although exact dates are unknown. Each hundred had a 'fyrd', which acted as the local defence force and a court which was responsible for the maintenance of the frankpledge system. They also formed a unit for the collection of taxes. The role of the hundred court was described in the Dooms (laws) of King Edgar. The name of the hundred was normally that of its meeting-place.

The Pitney hundred grew in the 16th century from two free manors and a neighbouring borough. The Hundred of Pitney consisted of the ancient parishes of: Langport Eastover, Muchelney, and Pitney. It covered an area of 3,690 acres (1,490 ha).

The importance of the hundred courts declined from the seventeenth century. By the 19th century several different single-purpose subdivisions of counties, such as poor law unions, sanitary districts, and highway districts sprang up, filling the administrative role previously played by parishes and hundreds. Although the Hundreds have never been formally abolished, their functions ended with the establishment of county courts in 1867 and the introduction of districts by the Local Government Act 1894.
