= Muchelney Abbey =

English Heritage property

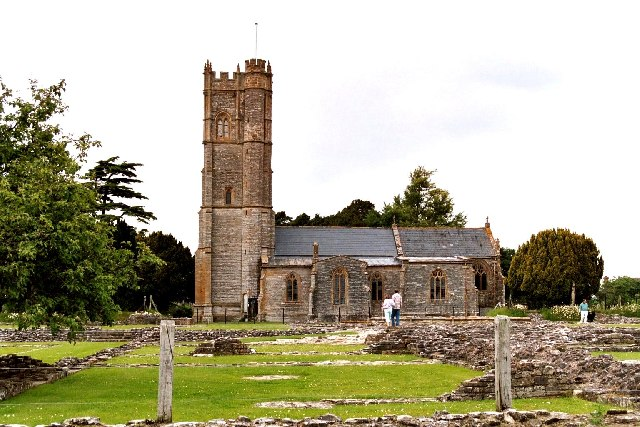
- The Church of St Peter and St Paul in the background. In the foreground are the ruins of the main abbey building.

- Location within Somerset
- Interactive map of Muchelney Abbey

Monastery information
- Order: Benedictine
- Established: 10th century
- Disestablished: 1538

People
- Founders: Cynewulf, Centwine, Ine, Æthelstan and Æthelred

Site
- Location: Muchelney, Somerset, England
- Coordinates: 51°01′13″N 02°48′57″W

Muchelney Abbey is an English Heritage property in the village of Muchelney in the Somerset Levels, England. The site consists of ruined walls showing the layout of the abbey buildings constructed from the 7th to 16th centuries, and the remaining intact Abbot's House. It is next to the parish church in which some of the fabric of the abbey has been reused.

It comprises the remains and foundations of a medieval Benedictine abbey, the site of an earlier Anglo-Saxon abbey, and an early Tudor house dating from the 16th century, formerly the lodgings of the resident Abbot, which is now a Grade I listed building. The ruins of the abbey have been designated as a scheduled monument.

The abbey was founded in the 7th or 8th century, damaged by Viking raids and rebuilt and refounded in the 10th century. It owned and managed local land. The buildings were expanded from the 12th to 16th centuries until its dissolution in 1538. Most of the buildings were demolished and the stone used in local buildings, although the Abbot's House and reredorter survive. Some of the tiles and other decorative features from the monastic church were reused in the adjacent parish Church of St Peter and St Paul. Since 1927 the ruins have been in public ownership.

== Toponymy ==
The name derives from two elements: Old English: micel 'big, great', and Anglian: ēg, 'an island'. The second element frequently refers to 'dry ground surrounded by marsh' in ancient place names. Compare Athelney, and Isleworth Ait and Chiswick Eyot on the Thames.

== History ==
The site of the Abbey was effectively an island in the marshy and frequently flooded Somerset Levels. There is believed to have been a religious building erected on the site as early as 693, with a charter being granted by Cynewulf in 762, although the Benedictine monks were not established there until the 10th century. Viking raids in the area damaged some of the fabric of the abbey and necessitated rebuilding. The refounders of the Abbey are not completely clear; however in a document of 1535 (drawn up following the Valor Ecclesiasticus), Centwine, Ine, Æthelstan and Æthelred are claimed as founders. Tradition suggests that Æthelstan's contribution was penance for the murder of Atheling Edwin in 933 or following victory at the Battle of Brunanburh in 937. The charter of King Ine is known to be a forgery, however it may have some basis in fact. The charters were placed in the Museum of Somerset in 1946 on permanent loan from Lady Ailesbury.

According to the Domesday Book of 1086, Benedictine Muchelney owned Muchelney, Midelney and Thorney islands. At that time in 1086 the abbey paid a tax of 6,000 eels a year caught from the local rivers and marshes.

Much of the building was carried out in the 12th century. The abbot successfully appropriated the nearby Perry Moor and surrounding areas and was involved in their drainage and management. A manuscript fragment containing the abbey's bede-roll dating from the 12th and 13th centuries is held in the library of St. John's College, Cambridge. Around 1308 the abbey built The Priest's House for the parish priest. It is now owned by the National Trust. It has been designated as a grade II listed building. Much of the abbey was rebuilt under abbots William Wyke (1489-1504) and Thomas Broke (1505-1522) with the funding being provided by the leasing of the Demesne farm.

Between the 13th century and the dissolution five monks were sent from Muchelney to the University of Oxford studying at either Canterbury College or Gloucester College. By the 16th century the Abbey included an Abbey Church, the demesne farm barton, an almonry, the parish church of St Peter and St Paul with its vicarage, and a Cross dating from the 15th century (moved in 1830 to near the parish church). The monastic church was built on the site of an early Saxon Church.

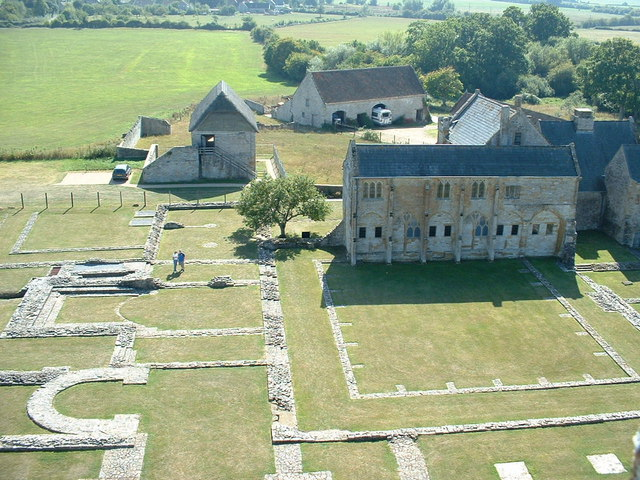
The ruins of the abbey, and the Abbot's House at right.

In the inquiry into monastic finances of 1535, Muchelney was recorded as distributing £6 13s 4d in cash as alms.

In 1538 the Abbey with all land and possessions was surrendered by the monks to Henry VIII in the course of the Dissolution of the Monasteries. The main buildings of the abbey were then demolished, although some of the decorative floor tiles were relaid in the neighbouring Church of St Peter and St Paul. The whole property and advowson was then granted to Edward Seymour, Earl of Hertford, later 1st Duke of Somerset. On his execution in 1552 it reverted to The Crown. Stone from the abbey was used in many of the local buildings. In 1872 when collecting stone labourers found a blue stone coffin lid under which the pavement of the 14th century lady chapel was uncovered. In 1924 a pageant was held at the site, involving around 500 people, representing the history of the abbey from its foundation to the dissolution.

In 1927 the ruins of the abbey were taken over by the Office of Works, and later passed to English Heritage. The Abbot's House was designated as a Grade I listed building in 1959.

== Architecture ==
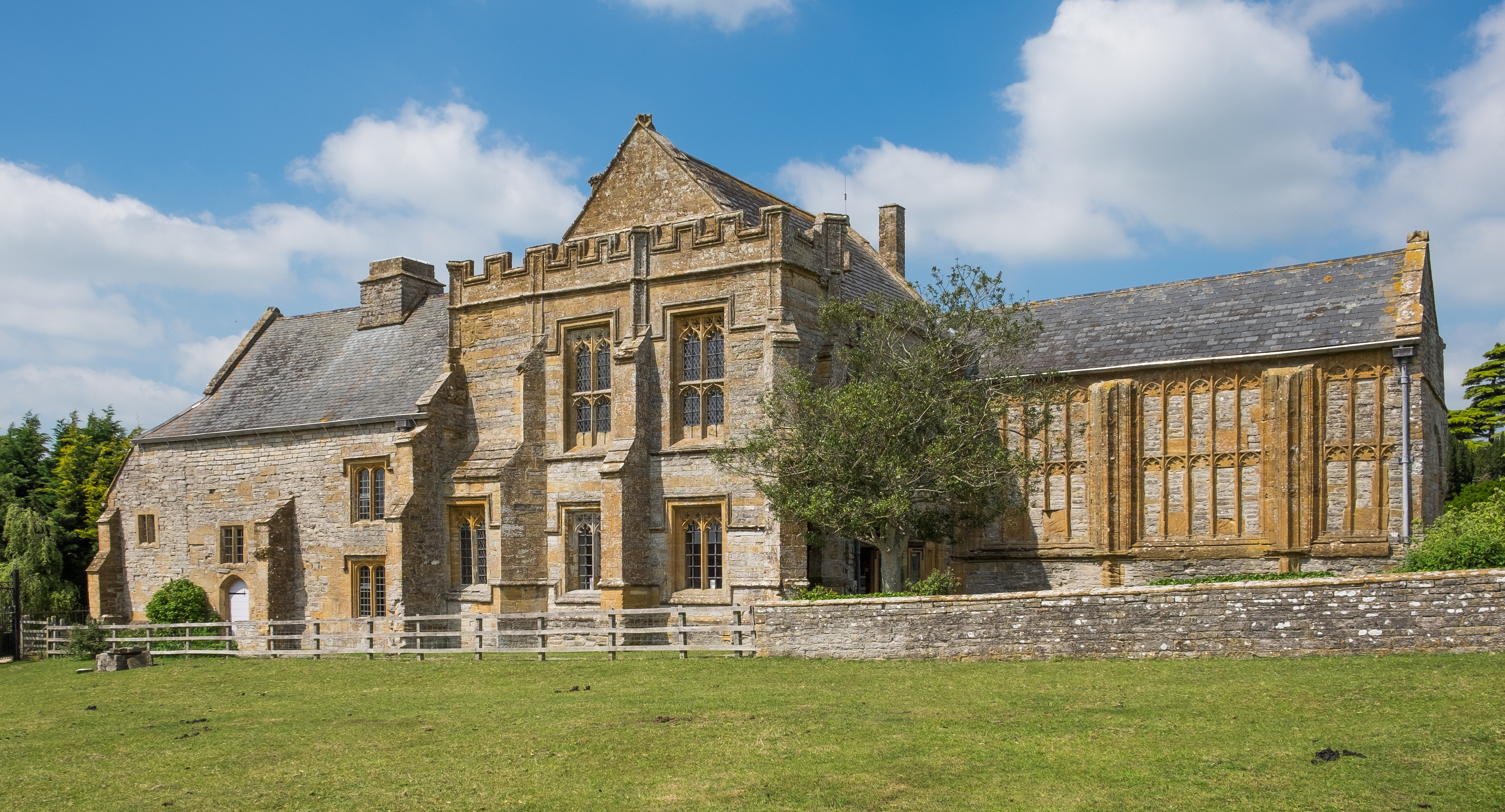
Abbot's House at Muchelney Abbey

The Abbey is the second largest in Somerset after Glastonbury. The church is 192 feet (59 m) long and 52 feet (16 m) wide. Of the main building only some foundation walls remain. The south cloister walk and the north wall of a refectory are other surviving features. The south cloister includes remnants of the arcading and fan vault ceiling.

The only intact structure is the Abbot's House with well-preserved architectural features including external stonework and inside a great chamber with ornate fireplace, carved settle and stained glass, and timber roof. Some of the wall paintings within the abbot’s house are in need of restoration.

An unusual attraction is the nearby thatched two-storey monks' reredorter or lavatory, which is considered unique in Britain.

A barn west of the abbey is a scheduled monument.

== Bibliography ==
- Adkins, Lesley; Adkins, Roy (1992). A Field Guide to Somerset Archeology. Dovecote Press. ISBN 0946159947.
- Dunning, Robert (2001). Somerset Monasteries. Tempus. ISBN 0752419412.
- Dunning, Robert (2003). A History of Somerset (3rd ed.). Somerset Books. ISBN 0861834763.
- Hugo, Thomas (1859). A memoir of Muchelney Abbey, in the county of Somerset. F. May.
- Quinn, Tom (2008). Hidden Britain. New Holland Publishers. ISBN 9781847731296.
- Page, William (1911). "Houses of Benedictine monks: The abbey of Muchelney". A History of the County of Somerset: Volume 2. Institute of Historical Research.
- Storer, Bernard (1985). The Natural History of the Somerset Levels. Dovecote Press. ISBN 0946159289.
- Williams, Robin; Williams, Romney (1992). The Somerset Levels. Ex Libris Press. ISBN 0948578386.
