= Church of All Saints, Kingsdon =

Church in Somerset, England

Church of All Saints
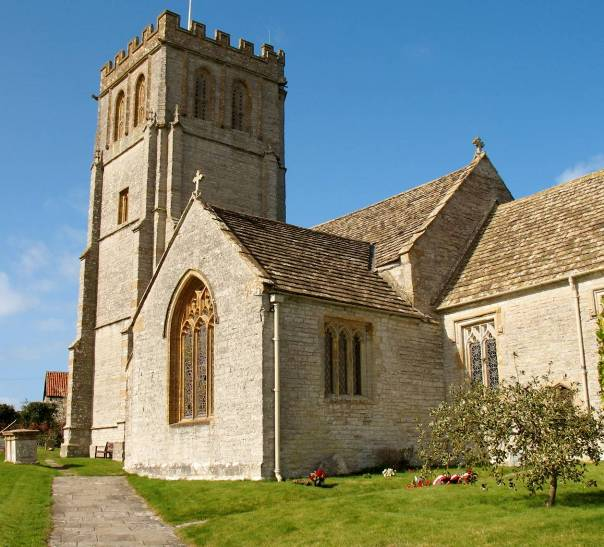

- Location within Somerset
- 51.0331°N 2.6920°W
- Location: Kingsdon, Somerset, England

History
- Built: 15th century

Listed Building – Grade II*
- Official name: Church of All Saints
- Designated: 17 April 1959
- Reference no.: 1223613

The Church of All Saints in Kingsdon, Somerset, England was built in the 13th century. It is a Grade II* listed building.

== History ==
Parts if the church date from the 13th century, although it has been renovated and revised many times since particularly in the 15th century when the west tower was added replacing one at the north of the building. It underwent a Victorian restoration in 1869 and further work in 1906.

The parish is one of five in the benefice of 'Somerton with Compton Dundon, The Charltons and Kingsdon'.

== Architecture ==
The stone building has hamstone dressings and a slate roof. It has a cruciform plan with chancel, north transept and nave.

The four-stage tower has six bells and a clock which has no face, but has recently been restored to chime the hours. The oldest of the bells was cast in the 14th century and recast in 1951. The tower is supported by corner buttresses.

The interior includes a pulpit from 1627 and a 13th-century font. There is a hamstone effigy of a cross-legged knight under the north window.

== See also ==
- List of ecclesiastical parishes in the Diocese of Bath and Wells
