= Kingsdon, Somerset =

Village and civil parish in Somerset, England

Coordinates: 51.0358°N 2.6930°W

Kingsdon
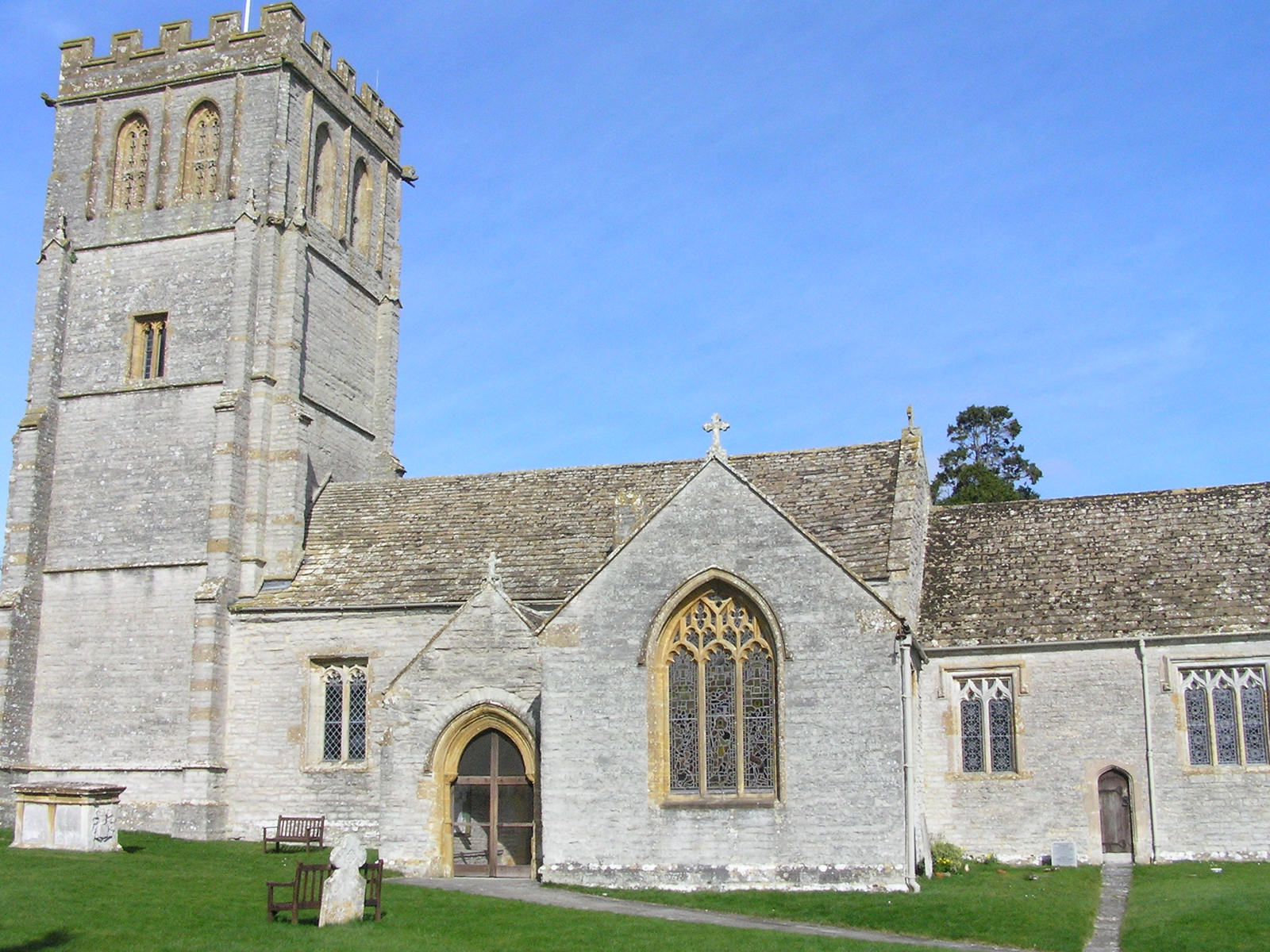
- All Saints Church

- Location within Somerset
- Population: 303 (2011)
- OS grid reference: ST515265
- Unitary authority: Somerset Council
- Ceremonial county: Somerset
- Region: South West
- Country: England
- Sovereign state: United Kingdom
- Post town: Somerton
- Postcode district: TA11
- Dialling code: 01935
- Police: Avon and Somerset
- Fire: Devon and Somerset
- Ambulance: South Western
- UK Parliament: Glastonbury and Somerton

Kingsdon is a village and parish in Somerset, England, situated 3 miles (4.8 km) south east of Somerton. The village has a population of 303 but this is set to rise to around 350 once the Kingsdon Manor development is complete. The majority of the houses in the village are clustered on the side of the hill from which there are scenic views across the Somerset countryside.

Many of the old buildings and houses in the village are protected with listed building status and the centre is also a conservation area. Recently built houses have been faced with Blue Lias stone to ensure that they blend in suitably to the village. Some buildings are thatched, including the Kingsdon Inn.

Kingsdon village shop is situated in the former primary school and is a volunteer-run enterprise set up in 2014 as an Industrial and Provident Society for the Benefit of the Community (IPS Bencom). Outside of the shop the old telephone box has been restored to provide a library. Other amenities include a village hall, allotments and adventure play equipment on the recreation field. Kingsdon has its own cricket ground in the grounds of the former Manor. The Kingsdon Chronicle is produced monthly as an independent journal and delivered free of charge to all residents.

The village is in the low fly zone for RNAS Yeovilton. Within the wider Kingsdon parish is World Horse Welfare's Glenda Spooner Farm Rescue and Re-homing Centre, named after Glenda Spooner founder, chairman and organising secretary of the Ponies of Britain Club and which cares for around 65 horses at a time.

== History ==
The village is situated near the Fosse Way Roman road and two Roman villas were excavated in the village in the 19th century, but nothing remains of them today.

The village name is derived from Kingsdon Hill which is in the north west of the parish and reflects its history as part of the royal estate of Somerton at the time of the Norman Conquest. The manor was granted to the Gouvis family by 1194, and in 1528, bought by Thomas Arundell of Wardour Castle, whose descendants held it until it was sold to Aaron Moody in 1801.

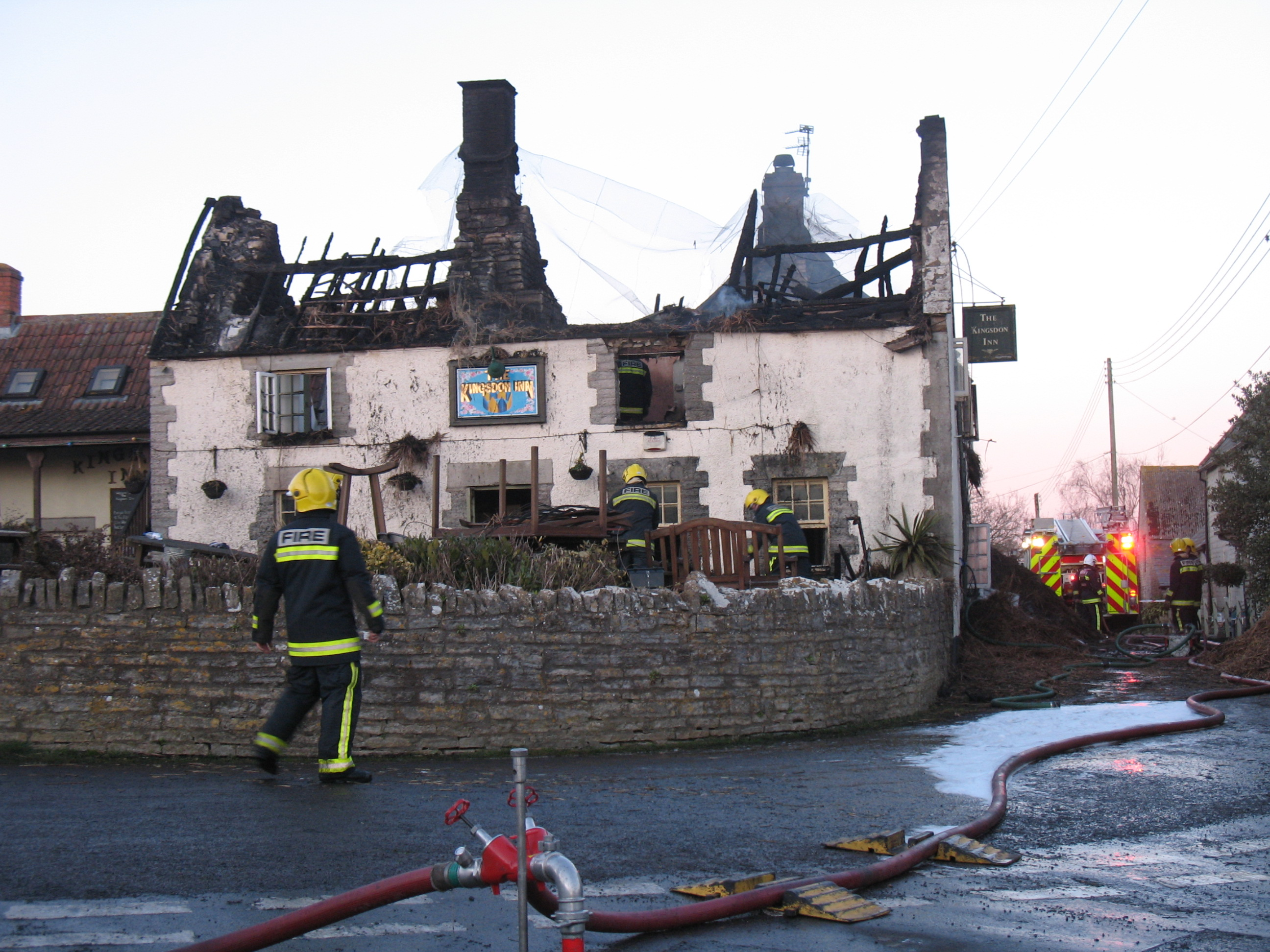
The Kingsdon Inn on the evening after the fire.

On 4 March 2010 the thatched roof of the Kingsdon Inn, the village pub, caught fire and the roof was destroyed. £250,000 was subsequently spent repairing the building which was built in the early 19th century.

== Governance ==
The parish council has responsibility for local issues, including setting an annual precept (local rate) to cover the council's operating costs and producing annual accounts for public scrutiny. The parish council evaluates local planning applications and works with the local police, district council officers, and neighbourhood watch groups on matters of crime, security, and traffic. The parish council's role also includes initiating projects for the maintenance and repair of parish facilities, as well as consulting with the district council on the maintenance, repair, and improvement of highways, drainage, footpaths, public transport, and street cleaning. Conservation matters (including trees and listed buildings) and environmental issues are also the responsibility of the council.

For local government purposes, since 1 April 2023, the parish comes under the unitary authority of Somerset Council. Prior to this, it was part of the non-metropolitan district of South Somerset (established under the Local Government Act 1972). It was part of Langport Rural District before 1974.

It is also part of the Glastonbury and Somerton county constituency represented in the House of Commons of the Parliament of the United Kingdom. It elects one member of parliament (MP) by the first past the post system of election.

== Geography ==
To the east of the village lies the River Cary and Lytes Cary a manor house with associated chapel and gardens. The property, owned by the National Trust, has parts dating to the 14th century, with other sections dating to the 15th, 16th, 18th, and 20th centuries. "Yet all parts blend to perfection with one another and with the gentle sunny landscape that surrounds them," comments Nikolaus Pevsner. The House is listed as Grade I by English Heritage.

South of the village is the A372 road which runs to Bridgwater from the Podimore roundabout on the A303.

== Education ==
There was a small Church of England Primary School, founded 1872, with about 10 pupils aged 4–11 years. It closed in August 2011 due to pupil numbers. In 2014 the former school was opened as a community village shop.

The village was, up until the end of the summer term 2008, home to Kingsdon Manor School, which served Bristol and other local areas as a residential Special School, for up to 40 boys aged 10–16 years with emotional or behavioural difficulties. It was housed in a large manor house built in 1830. The manor house is presently being converted for residential use with additional housing to be built in the grounds.

== Religious sites ==
The ancient church, dedicated to All Saints, has a four-stage tower which was built in the 15th century replacing a previous one over the north transept. It has six bells and a clock which has no face, but has recently been restored to chime the hours. There is a hamstone effigy of a cross-legged knight under the north window. The parish is one of five in the benefice of 'Somerton with Compton Dundon, The Charltons and Kingsdon'.
