= Long Sutton, Somerset =

Village and civil parish in Somerset, England

Coordinates: 51.025841°N 2.760555°W

Long Sutton
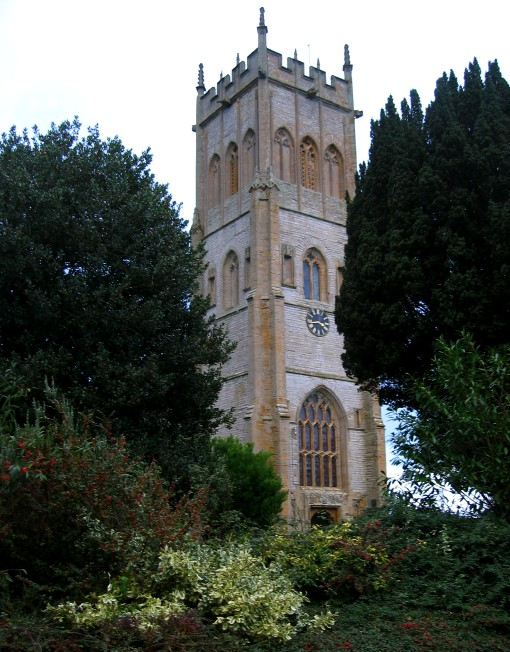
- Holy Trinity church

- Location within Somerset
- Population: 833 (2011)
- OS grid reference: ST467254
- Unitary authority: Somerset Council
- Ceremonial county: Somerset
- Region: South West
- Country: England
- Sovereign state: United Kingdom
- Post town: LANGPORT
- Postcode district: TA10
- Dialling code: 01458
- Police: Avon and Somerset
- Fire: Devon and Somerset
- Ambulance: South Western
- UK Parliament: Glastonbury and Somerton

Long Sutton is a village and civil parish in Somerset, England, situated 4 miles (6.4 km) south of Somerton. The village has a population of 833.

The village of Long Sutton has a village green with a lime tree at each corner and a chestnut tree in the centre. The Devonshire Arms Hotel is at one end of the green and at the other are the school and Holy Trinity church, dating from 1493. The village is made up of two hamlets, Knole at one end and Upton at the other.

The Reading to Taunton line railway runs under the bridge at Upton and at one time certain trains stopped at Long Sutton and Pitney Halt, as it was called until its closure in the early 1960s. The bridge over the River Yeo is medieval in origin, but was probably reshaped in the 18th century.

== History ==
There is evidence of Roman occupation throughout the parish. It was recorded in the Domesday Book as Sutone. The parish of Long Sutton was part of the hundred of Somerton.

The manor was given by King Alfred to his Athelney Abbey and was held by the abbey until the dissolution of the monasteries in 1539. In 1600 it was bought by Sir John Spencer, who was previously the Lord Mayor of London. It was later part of the estates of the Duke of Devonshire, who dispersed it in 1919.

Until the 20th century agriculture remained the main industry. The population has remained between 800 and 1,000 from about 1800.

== Governance ==
The parish council has responsibility for local issues, including setting an annual precept (local rate) to cover the council's operating costs and producing annual accounts for public scrutiny. The parish council evaluates local planning applications and works with the local police, district council officers, and neighbourhood watch groups on matters of crime, security, and traffic. The parish council's role also includes initiating projects for the maintenance and repair of parish facilities, as well as consulting with the district council on the maintenance, repair, and improvement of highways, drainage, footpaths, public transport, and street cleaning. Conservation matters (including trees and listed buildings) and environmental issues are also the responsibility of the council.

For local government purposes, since 1 April 2023, the parish comes under the unitary authority of Somerset Council. Prior to this, it was part of the non-metropolitan district of South Somerset (established under the Local Government Act 1972). It was part of Langport Rural District before 1974.

The village is in Turn Hill electoral ward. Long Sutton may be the most populous area of the ward but it stretches west to Aller. The total population of this ward taken at the 2011 census was 2,830.

It is also part of the Glastonbury and Somerton county constituency represented in the House of Commons of the Parliament of the United Kingdom. It elects one Member of Parliament (MP) by the first past the post system of election.

== Landmarks ==
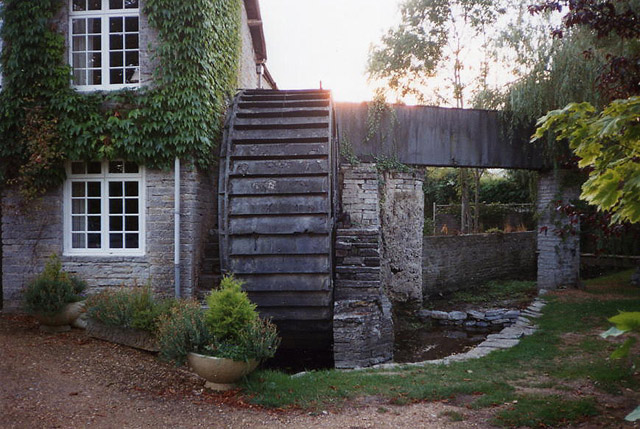
Knole Mill waterwheel

Opposite the Quaker Meeting House, known as Quakers' Corner, are two cottages, one thatched. In one of these cottages it is said that Mrs Palmer of Huntley & Palmers fame made her first biscuits and cakes to help provide for her family. Some of the gravestones mark the resting place of the Palmer family in the grounds of the Friends' Meeting House.

The Manor House, on the green, probably dates from the late 15th century. Court House on Langport road is from a similar period.

Knole has a waterwheel dating from 1879, having been moved from a site higher upstream where it was first recorded in 1479–80. The wheel is 15 feet (4.6 m) in diameter and 5 feet (2 m) in width and was cast by ‘The Somerset Wheel & Wagon Co, Engineers & Millwrights, Martock’.

== Religious sites ==
=== Holy Trinity church ===
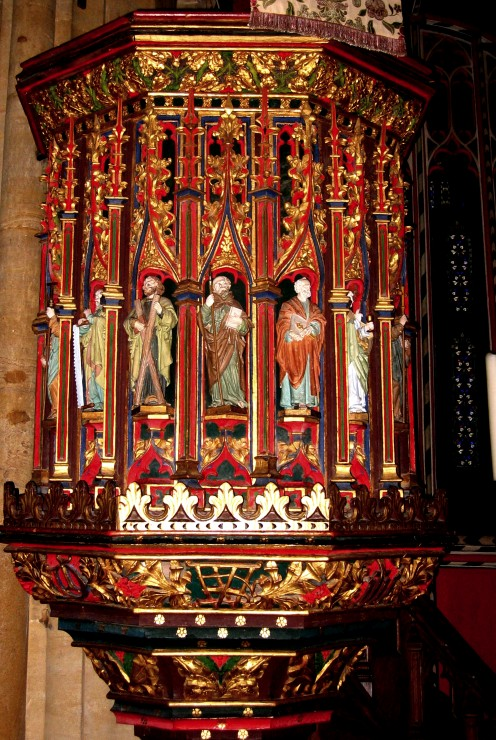
The painted pulpit

Holy Trinity church dates from 1493. An earlier church would have stood on this site from the 9th century or earlier. The current church was built of local lias stone cut and squared, with hamstone dressings. It has stone slate roofs between stepped coped gabled with finials to the chancel and north porch. Internally, the chancel has a ceiled wagon-roof, with moulded ribs and plaster panels. The tower exhibits the tracery typical of Somerset towers. The under-tower space has a lierne vault, and a 15th-century octagonal font with quatrefoil panels. The building has been designated by English Heritage as a Grade I listed building. The tower has a ring of six bells, the tenor weighing 136 stone (864 kg).

The coloured timber pulpit, with a fly approach stair, dates from 1455 to 1458 and is older than the church itself. It has 20th-century wood figures in the statue niches. It bears the initials identified as those of Abbot John Petherton of Athelney and vicar William Singleton.

The wood screen is also ornately carved and dates from the late 15th century. Memorials in the church include a tablet to Elizabeth Banbury, died 1716, with Corinthian columns and entablature, side and bottom swags, as well as a number of 16th- and 17th-century Keinton stone slabs in the floor.

=== Quaker Meeting House ===
The parish was a centre of Quaker worship from 1662, and there was a licensed meeting-house by 1669. The present Quaker Meeting House was built in Queen Anne style and finished in 1717, with a bequest from William Steele. It is still used for worship by the Quakers. It was closed briefly in 1793 and 1798, but prospered after the closure of the Somerton meeting house in 1828. There is a mounting block outside the building, which worshippers used to mount and dismount their horses. Worshippers came from as far away as Street, nearly seven miles away.

== Culture ==
Punkie Night originated many years ago and was started by farm labourers to light their way home after work. An alternative explanation of the term is that it is derived from pumpkin or punk, meaning tinder. It is now the "children's night" and held on the nearest night to Halloween. The children carry their "punkies" made from either mangolds, turnips, or marrows, which are hollowed out and faces or animals carved on them. They are lit with a candle inside similar to the modern Halloween custom.

== Notable residents ==
- George Palmer, founder of Huntley and Palmers biscuits, was born in the village.
- 2004 Children's Champion Award winner Doreen Roberts MBE foster mother to over 300 children.
- Antony Jay CVO Writer, broadcast, director and actor. Famous for co-authorship of political television comedy Yes Minister and Yes Prime Minister.
