= Kingston St Mary =

Village in Somerset, England

Coordinates: 51.0595°N 3.1072°W

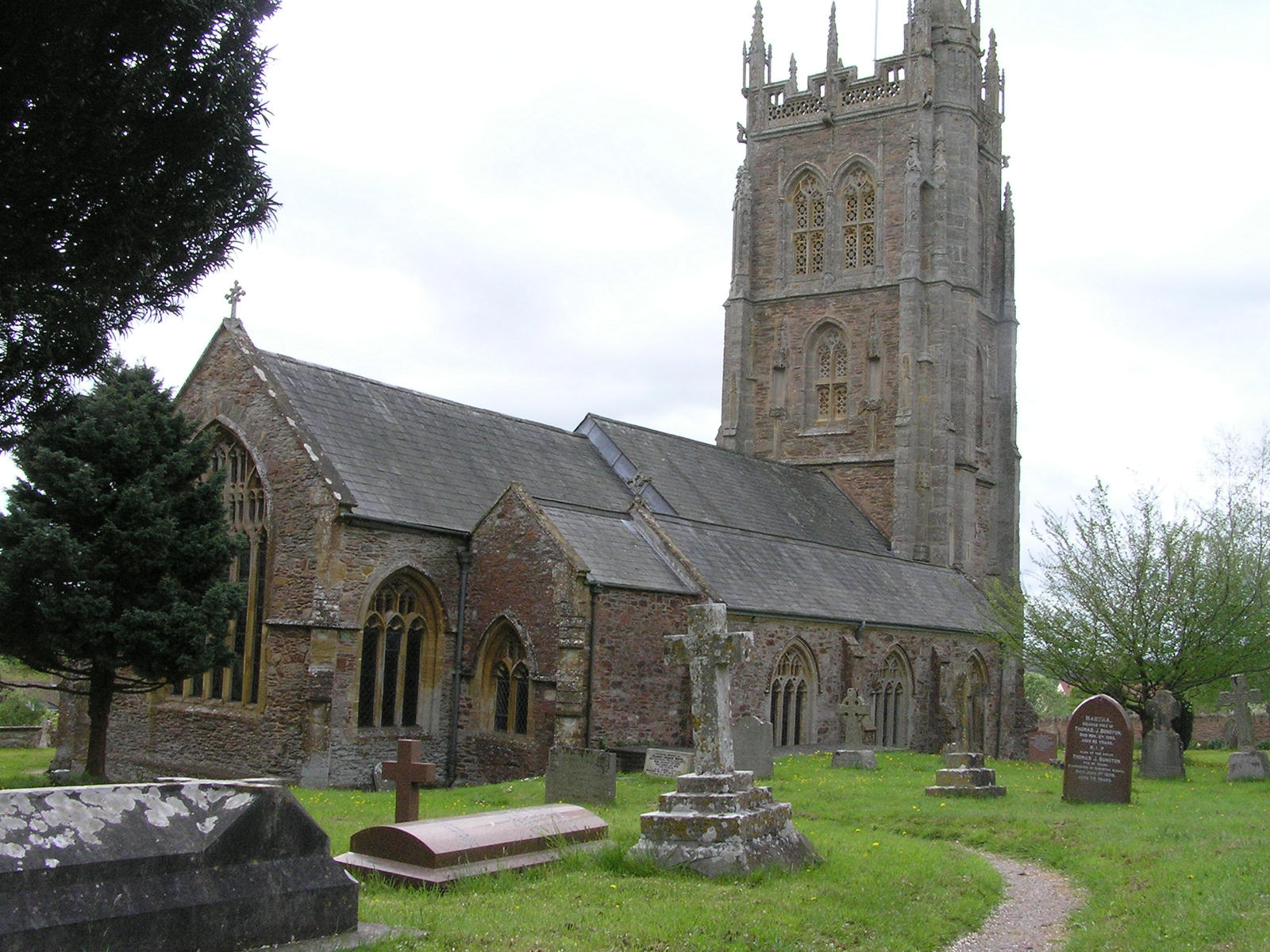
- Church of St Mary, Kingston St Mary

- Location within Somerset
- Population: 921 (2011)
- OS grid reference: ST225295
- Unitary authority: Somerset Council
- Ceremonial county: Somerset
- Region: South West
- Country: England
- Sovereign state: United Kingdom
- Post town: TAUNTON
- Postcode district: TA2
- Dialling code: 01823
- Police: Avon and Somerset
- Fire: Devon and Somerset
- Ambulance: South Western
- UK Parliament: Taunton and Wellington

Kingston St Mary is a village and parish in Somerset, England, situated at the southern end of the Quantock Hills 4 miles (6.4 km) north of Taunton. The village has a population of 921.

The parish includes the hamlets of Yarford which includes the Grade II Cutley Farmhouse and Fulford where Fulford House was built about 1830, which has been designated by English Heritage as a Grade II listed building.

== History ==
The first part of the village name comes from 'the king's settlement' having belonged to the kings of the West Saxons before being ceded to the Bishop of Winchester as part of the manor of Taunton Deane, with the church's dedication being added in the 20th century.

The parish of Kingston was part of the Taunton Deane Hundred.

== Governance ==
The parish council has responsibility for local issues, including setting an annual precept (local rate) to cover the council's operating costs and producing annual accounts for public scrutiny. The parish council evaluates local planning applications and works with the local police, district council officers, and neighbourhood watch groups on matters of crime, security, and traffic. The parish council's role also includes initiating projects for the maintenance and repair of parish facilities, as well as consulting with the district council on the maintenance, repair, and improvement of highways, drainage, footpaths, public transport, and street cleaning. Conservation matters (including trees and listed buildings) and environmental issues are also the responsibility of the council.

For local government purposes, since 1 April 2023, the village comes under the unitary authority of Somerset Council. Prior to this, it was part of the non-metropolitan district of Somerset West and Taunton (formed on 1 April 2019) and, before this, the district of Taunton Deane (established under the Local Government Act 1972). From 1894-1974, for local government purposes, Kingston St Mary was part of Taunton Rural District.

It is also part of the Taunton and Wellington county constituency represented in the House of Commons of the Parliament of the United Kingdom. It elects one Member of Parliament (MP) by the first past the post system of election.

== Landmarks ==
The manor house on Lodes Lane dates from around 1560. It was originally known as Lodes and was probably built for Robert Knight whose descendants subsequently altered it.

Tetton House dates from 1790 and was enlarged and mainly rebuilt in 1924-6 by Harry Stuart Goodhart-Rendel for H. M. Herbert.

The Grange was built around 1862, by Sir George Gilbert Scott for Steele Perkins, and was visited by the future prime minister Anthony Eden during his holidays. It was later converted into an old peoples home. It is unlikely that the Grange was built by Scott but according to letters from Scott's architect Richard Coad, Scott did 'trifling alterations to a small house for Mr Perkins'. The Grange is now owned by Taunton School.

== Religious sites ==
The Church of St Mary in Kingston St Mary on the Quantock Hills dates from the 13th century but the tower is from the early 16th century and was reroofed in 1952, with further restoration 1976–8. It is a three-stage crenellated tower, with crocketed pinnacles with bracketed pinnacles set at angles, decorative pierced merlons, and set back buttresses crowned with pinnacles. The decorative "hunky punks" are perched high on the corners. There may be so named because the carvings are hunkering (squatting) and punch (short and thick). They serve no function, unlike gargoyles which carry off water. The churchyard includes tombs of the Warre family who owned nearby Hestercombe House.
