= Muchelney =

Village and civil parish in Somerset, England

Coordinates: 51.021°N 2.815°W

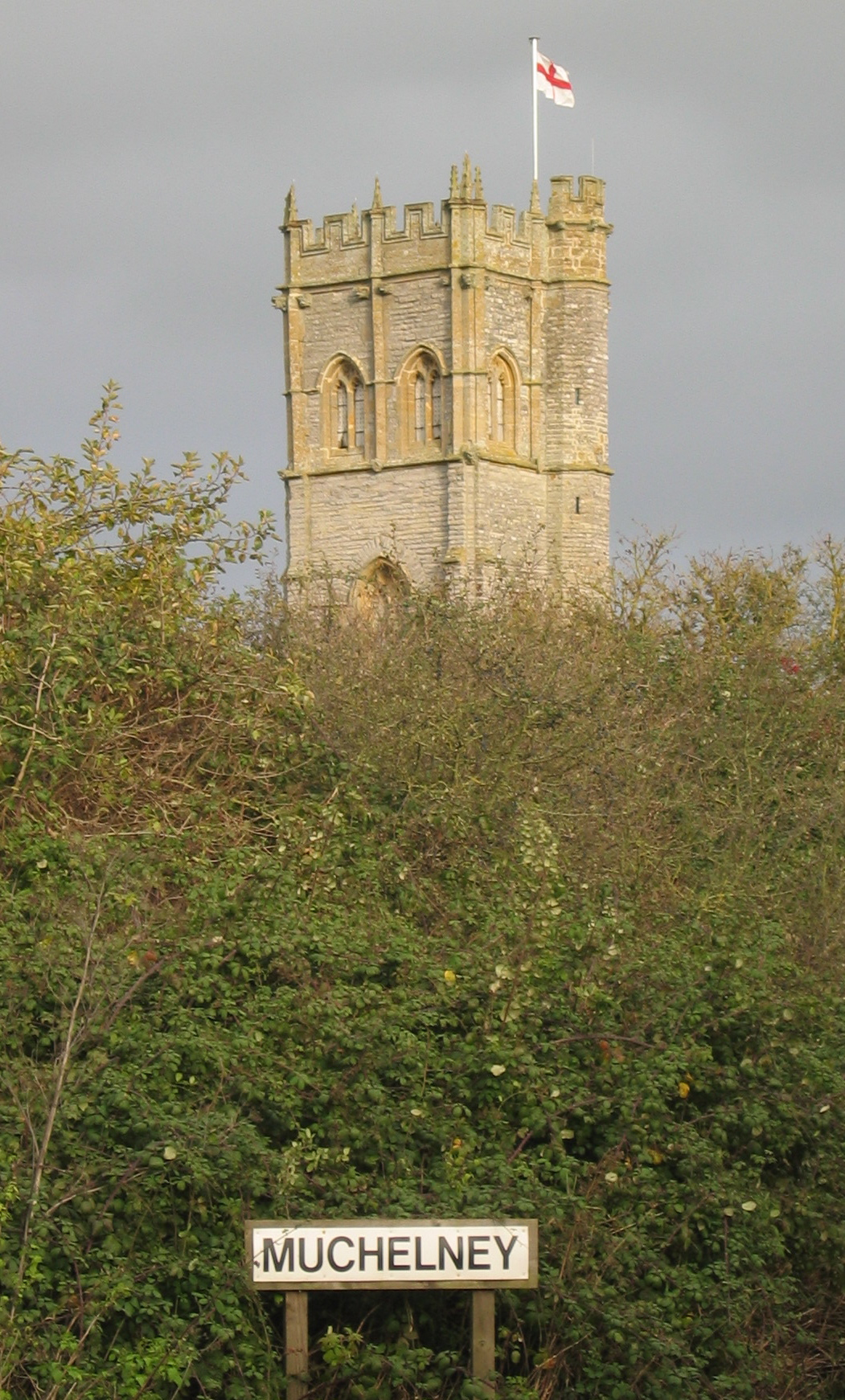
- The tower of St Peter and St Paul church rises above Muchelney

- Location within Somerset
- Area: 6.44 km^{2} (2.49 sq mi)
- Population: 195 (2011 census)
  - Density: 30/km^{2} (78/sq mi)
- OS grid reference: ST429249
- Unitary authority: Somerset
- Ceremonial county: Somerset
- Region: South West
- Country: England
- Sovereign state: United Kingdom
- Post town: Langport
- Postcode district: TA10
- Dialling code: 01458
- Police: Avon and Somerset
- Fire: Devon and Somerset
- Ambulance: South Western
- UK Parliament: Glastonbury and Somerton

Muchelney (/ˈmʌtʃəlni/) is a clustered village and civil parish in Somerset, England, extending for 3 kilometres (1.9 mi) from the south bank of the River Parrett. The village lies about 1 mile (1.6 km) south of Langport and 4 miles (6.4 km) south west of Somerton. The hamlets of Thorney and Muchelney Ham are in the south of the parish.

== History ==
A small settlement was recorded at Micelenie in the Domesday Book of 1086, meaning 'the increasingly great island' from the Old English micel and the Norsk Øe. The -ey or -y suffix served as the old English designation for "island", and thus is common to many of the villages in this area of the Somerset Levels, which stood as islands just above the marshes, which have since been drained.

The parish of Muchelney was part of the Pitney Hundred.

The village is best known as the site of Muchelney Abbey, a Benedictine abbey founded by King Athelstan in 939, and largely demolished in the Dissolution of the Monasteries. Architectural details of houses in the surrounding area are thought to incorporate fragments scavenged when the Abbey was destroyed.

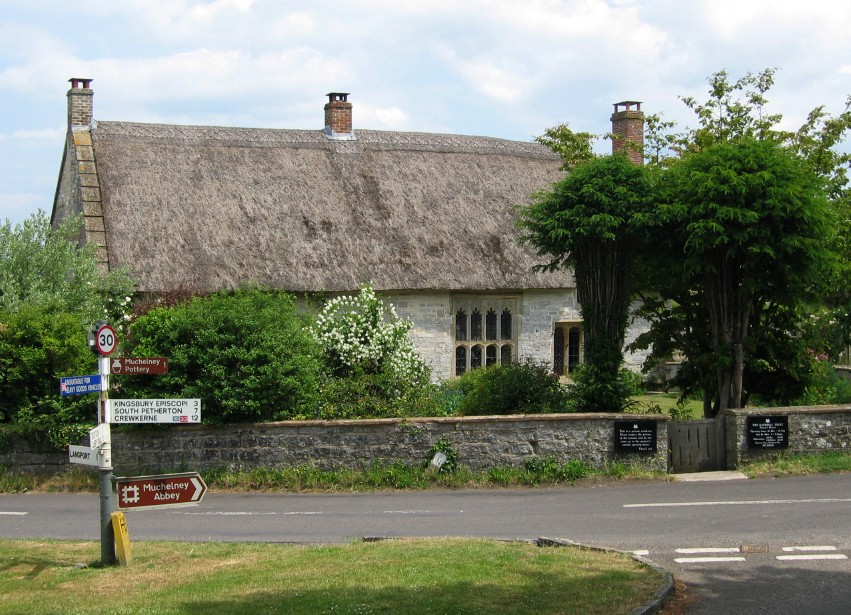
The thatched Priest's House

The remains of Muchelney Abbey, including Tudor monks' quarters, and exhibits, are managed by English Heritage. Other tourist attractions in Muchelney include the parish church of St Peter and St Paul; the Priest's House (built in 1308 and now managed by the National Trust), and the pottery of artist John Leach.

== Governance ==
The first tier of local government is Muchelney Parish Meeting. Almost all local government functions are carried out by Somerset Council, a unitary authority, and Muchelney is within Curry Rivel & Langport electoral division which elects two members to the council. For Westminster elections the parish is part of the Glastonbury and Somerton county constituency.

From 1894, the parish was part of Langport Rural District. Between 1974 and 2023 it was within the areas of Somerset County Council and South Somerset District Council.

== Geography and economy ==
To the east is Wet Moor, a biological Site of Special Scientific Interest, which forms part of the extensive grazing marsh grasslands and ditch systems of the Somerset Levels and Moors.

Muchelney is much subdivided in terms of fields and has a copse of natural woodland covering between 2 and 5% of its land in the middle of the south, the least inhabited area. A small minority of homes are not in the main centre but instead along the south-eastward leading street and these are locally known as Muchelney Ham. Many of the homes have agricultural farms or smallholdings, and some of the fields are orchards.

=== Incidence and prevention of flooding ===
Flooding historically relates here to the name of the county, Somerset, which before provision of engineered (straightened and deepened) rivers saw winter flooding across swathes of its central Levels area, giving its folk the uniquely seasonal descriptor 'of the summer'. Without engineered channels, parts of the upper part of the levels (such as the northern half of this parish) flood after heavy rainfall, often sufficiently deep to cut off all access. To counter this, residents of the main community (i.e. in the north) typically pre-emptively move their vehicles away from their village, such as to the south of the parish or to the north of the next parish. When the floods arrive, they share rides on a local tractor to reach their cars, and in this way they can get food and other supplies, and travel to work.

In the national floods of November 2012, access to the village was cut off for six days and floodwater in the north was too deep for tractors. Rescue boats reached the village on 29 November, rescuing nearly 100 people. Rescue boats were again required to supply the village during the rain and storms from Cyclone Dirk during Christmas 2013/New Year 2014. On 24 January 2014, in light of floods in the Somerset levels unprecedented for several decades and forecast further rainfall, Somerset County Council and Sedgemoor DC declared a major incident. At that time, the village had been cut off by floodwater for almost a month.

== Demography ==
2011 Published Statistics: Population, home ownership and extracts from Physical Environment, surveyed in 2005
Output area	Homes owned outright	Owned with a loan	Socially rented	Privately rented	Other	km² greenspace	km² roads	km² water	km² domestic gardens	Usual residents	km²
Civil parish	37	23	4	14	0	6.114	0.041	0.192	0.072	195	6.44

== Religious sites ==
St Peter and St Paul Parish Church, a Grade I listed building adjacent to Muchelney Abbey, has a ceiling enlivened with Jacobean paintings of bare-breasted angels, their nudity thought to symbolize innocent purity. It has a three-stage Somerset tower supported by pairs of full-height corner buttresses. The south-east octagonal stair turret leads to an outer door.

== Culture ==
Between 1984 and 2017, a highlight of the summer in Muchelney and Thorney was the mid-summer Lowland Games, a light-hearted adaptation of the Highland games. Events included (hay) bale racing, raft racing, ferret racing, welly tossing, a dog show, 10k flour trail run, tug-of-war, equestrian exhibitions, mud wrestling, and a battle of the bands (with the winning act getting a gig at the Glastonbury Festival).

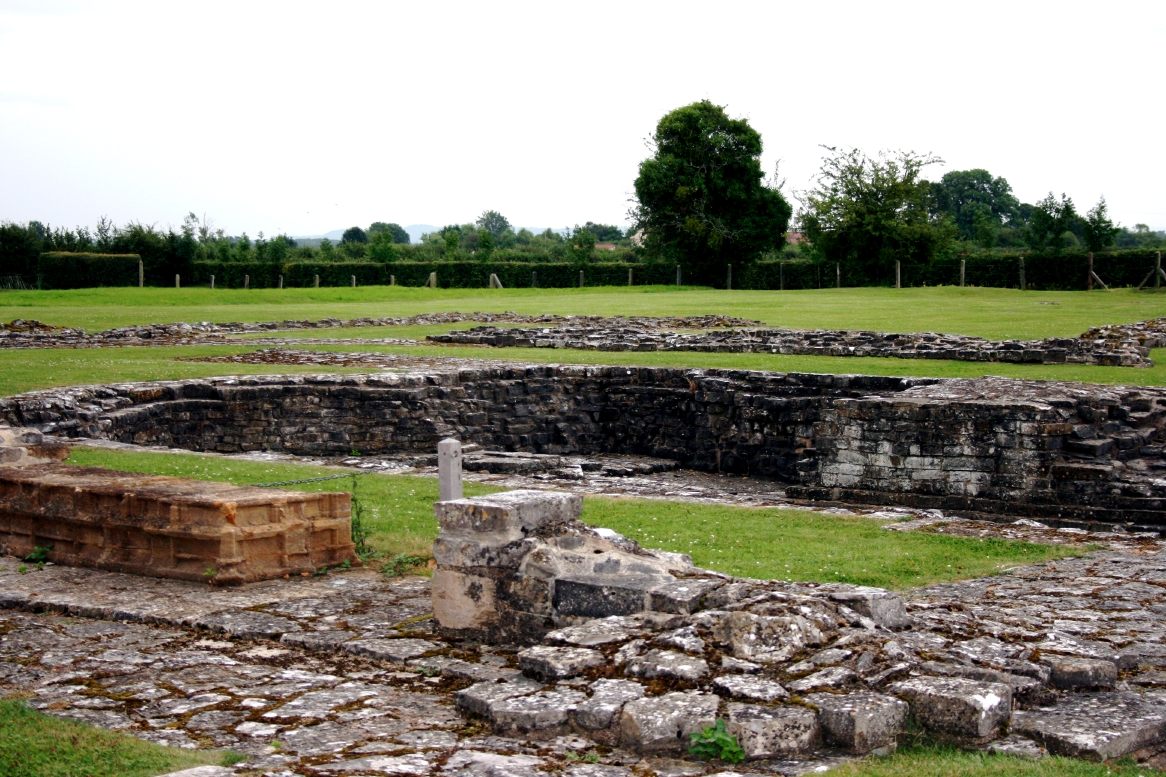
Ruins of Muchelney Abbey

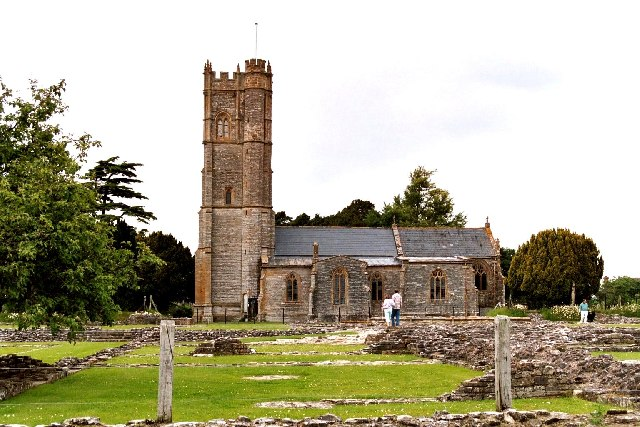
Muchelney parish church of St Peter and St Paul

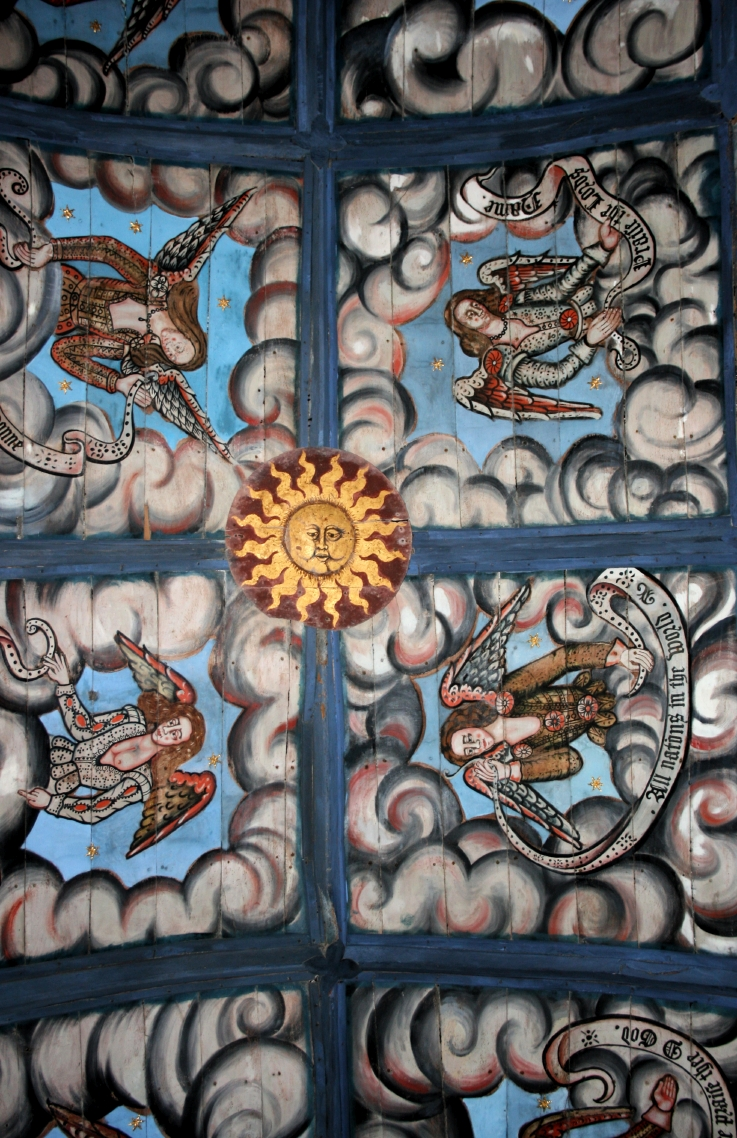
Bare-breasted Jacobean angels on the ceiling of Muchelney parish church
