= Somerset towers =

Gothic-style church towers

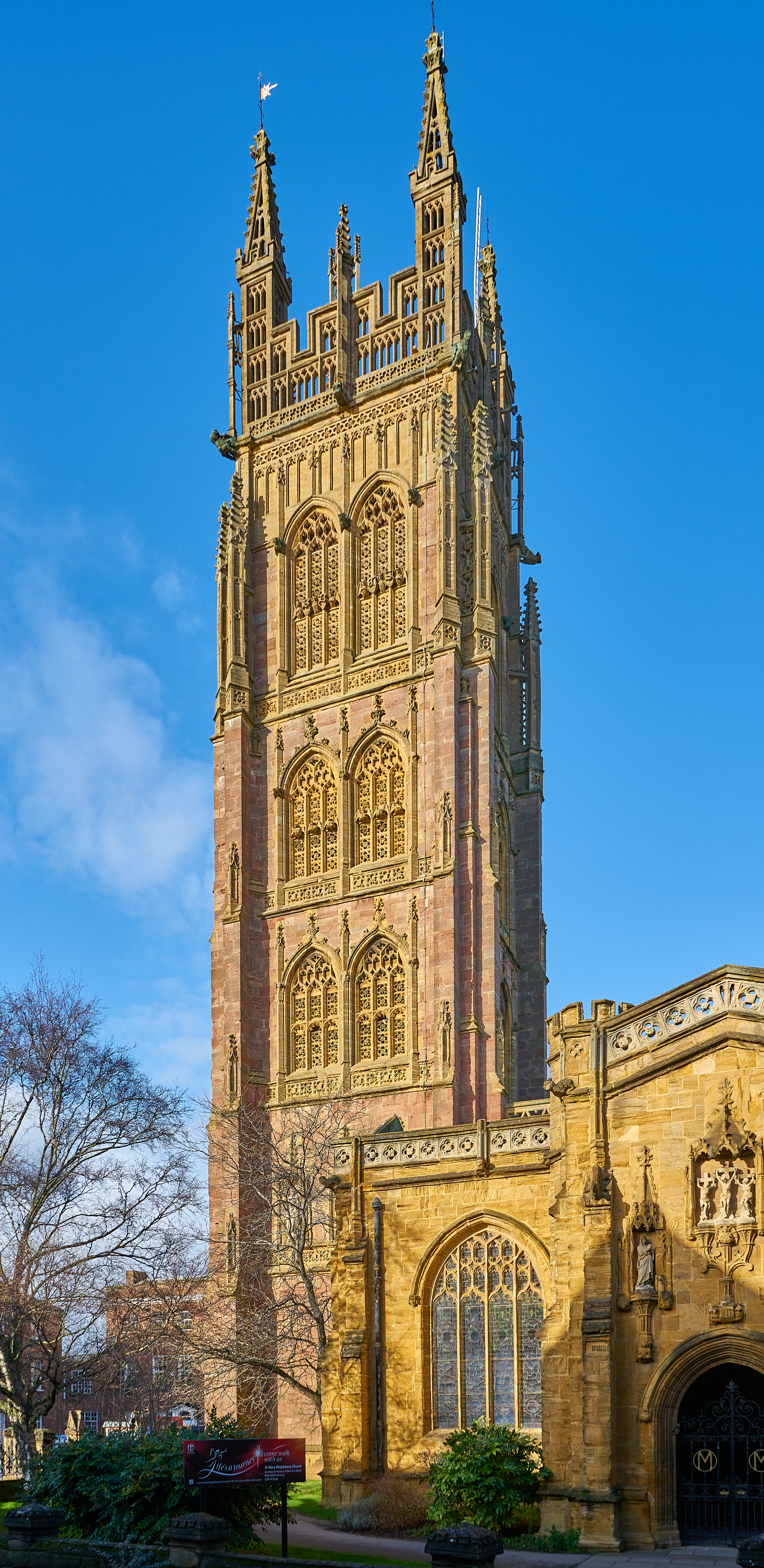
St. Mary Magdalene, Taunton "The grandest of all English parish church towers."

The Somerset towers are a collection of distinctive, mostly spireless Gothic church towers in the county of Somerset in south west England.

== Description ==
Newspaper columnist and editor Simon Jenkins has cited the towers as one of England's finest contributions to medieval art. Other authors write:

"They stand apart by reason of their style, their intricate decoration, and their great height, from which they command the low flat plains of Somerset."

"Somerset's wealth of some 90 late medieval towers, 50 of which are great designs by any standard, gives the county a unique place in the history of English art. The prosperity of the wool trade in the 15th century paid for the design and craftsmanship, displayed often in small villages, which still astonish us today."

Often built on the foundations of older Norman churches, the Perpendicular Gothic-style Somerset towers became landmarks for travelers, with their square, corner-buttressed towers typically positioned on the west side of the churches. The towers soar more than 100 feet (30 m) in some cases – 182 feet (55 m) in the case of Wells Cathedral's north tower (1440). Most of the towers house bells, and bell-ringing became a tradition still practiced in some of these English country churches. Most of the churches in this article have been designated, under the Planning (Listed Buildings and Conservation Areas) Act 1990, by English Heritage as grade I listed buildings, which is defined as encompassing those "of outstanding or national architectural or historic interest". Those that do not achieve grade I are listed as II*, which means "particularly significant buildings of more than local interest."

The prolific construction of the towers – some started before 1360 – was typically accomplished by a master mason and a small team of itinerant masons, supplemented by local parish laborers, according to Poyntz Wright. But other authors reject this model, suggesting instead that leading architects designed the parish church towers based on early examples of Perpendicular design and ornamentation developed for cathedrals – their most important commissions. Contract builders carried out the plans, adding a distinctive mix of innovative details and decorations as new designs emerged over the years.

"It is, indeed, a source of wonder that funds and skilled workmen were forthcoming in sufficient quantity to erect or rebuild so many churches within a comparatively short period. It was upon the Towers that the greatest skill of the Perpendicular builders was lavished."

=== Features ===
The Somerset tower of St. Mary's, Huish Episcopi, was featured on the 9-pence postage stamp in 1972.

Key architectural references in the development of the Somerset towers were Gloucester Cathedral, Wells Cathedral (begun around 1180 and consecrated 1239), and Glastonbury Abbey (begun 1184) and their renovations into the 14th century. Beyond these, however, the mason-architects of the era innovated and borrowed new designs from one another, adding additional storeys and elaborating decoration wherever there was money to support it. The Reformation in the 16th century largely brought to an end the era of Somerset tower construction.

The distinctive quality of the Somerset towers derives in large part from fine decorative details – pinnacles, lacy tracery windows and bell openings, gargoyles, and beautifully adorned doors, arches, parapets, buttresses, merlons, and tall external stair turrets, for example. This icing of sculpted decoration, often made of beautifully colored stone, was hewn from soft sedimentary limestone quarried around Somerset, including Bath stone, Doulting stone (quarried near Shepton Mallet), Dundry stone, and Hamstone (from Ham Hill since Roman times). This freestone can be cut in any direction, making possible fancy curves and fine details. Unfortunately, the softness of the stone also makes it subject to weathering.

For the foundations and walls of the towers, blue lias – a limestone from the area – was a frequent choice, but because of the difficulty and expense of transporting stone, stone from the nearest quarries was generally used, including red sandstone, and the softer freestone from quarries at Ham Hill, Bath, Doulting, and North Curry, for example.

== Classification and dating ==
How quickly the towers were built is controversial. Poyntz Wright estimates one or two years. John H. Harvey believes a construction rate of 10 feet (3 m) per year, allowing for gradual settlement, is more in accord with known medieval tower construction rates. The towers were commissioned by wealthy benefactors and parishes as a testament to their faith, as well as a highly visible sign of wealth and status. Nikolaus Pevsner notes that at the end of the 14th century, Somerset was producing a quarter of the wool products made in England and this was one of the sources of wealth that produced the Somerset towers. The boom in wool led to a comparable, though architecturally rather different, wave of equally extravagant parish churches in 15th century Suffolk. An additional source of support for some of the Somerset churches would have been close ties to nearby monasteries in Muchelney, Athelney, Glastonbury and Bath.

Because of the age of the Somerset towers, there are few records showing exactly when and by whom they were built. But for more than a century, experts have studied and classified the Somerset towers. Edward Augustus Freeman proposed a classification of the towers in 1851–1852, with Dr. F.J. Allen and R. P. Brereton offering new classifications in 1904. Wickham, who spent time as the vicar of Martock and later at East Brent, writing in 1952, accepted much of the classification scheme set out in earlier works, based on age and the arrangement of the windows. He argued, however, that the North Somerset group had been wrongly classified. Based on an early attempt to bring computer analysis to the study of the towers, Poyntz Wright in 1981 published a taxonomy of the towers to tease out patterns reflecting the chronology and teams of builders behind their construction. Based on details such as the numbers and arrangement of windows; presence, arrangement and decoration of pinnacles and merlons; and arrangement, location, and styling of buttresses, he described and proposed rough dates for "generations" of Somerset towers. For example, Poyntz Wright proposed "The Churchill Generation" as an early group including churches at Churchill, Compton Martin, and Compton Bishop. These churches were clustered based on traits such as having smaller towers with a single window in each face of the top stage; a pierced top parapet without merlons and four square-set corner pinnacles above.

In a 1984 article, John H. Harvey thoroughly rejects Poyntz Wright's systematics, the assumptions upon which it was based, and the resulting tower dates. Harvey stresses the importance of tower arches as conservative architectural features, contrasting these with decorative features that could be changed in later stages of construction – or even after the tower was complete:

"Whereas there is a substantial possibility of alteration in the tracery of a west window ... or of a later insertion of a west door, it is almost impossible for the tower-arch to be other than an integral part of the original build."

Harvey pushes many of Poyntz Wright's tower construction dates later, and some earlier. He cites Yeovil's church as one of the earliest Somerset towers, suggesting that its construction began well before 1400. He finds similarities in the Yeovil church's buttress scheme and parapet to the datable work of William Wynford at Winchester and Wells Cathedrals and works at Oxford.

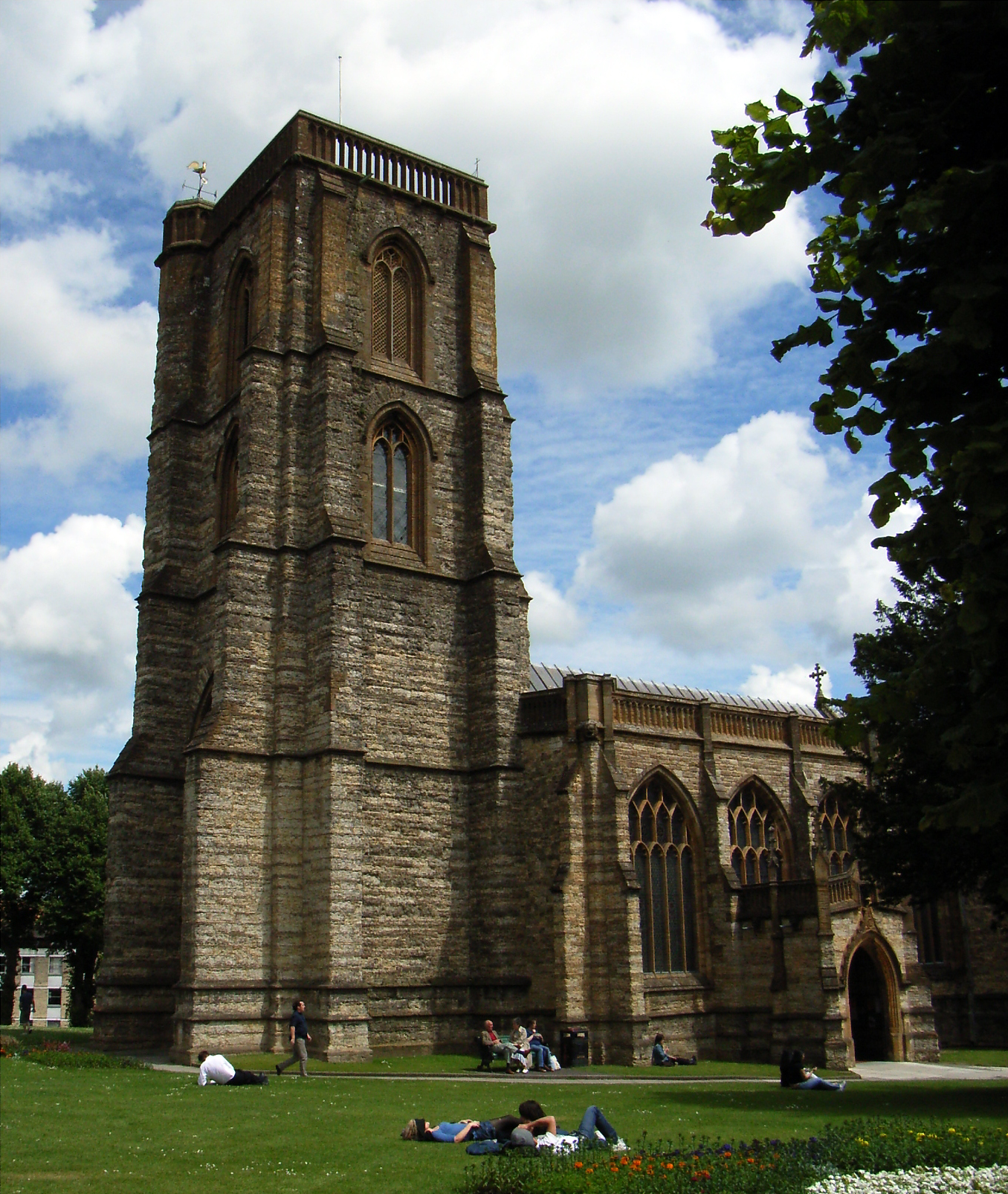
St. John's church in Yeovil

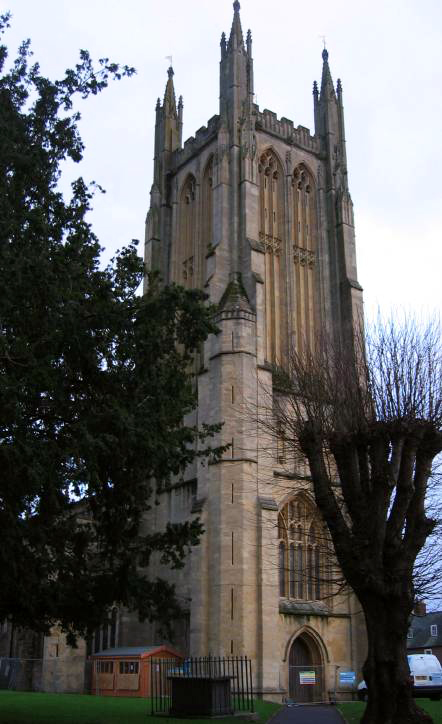
St. Cuthbert parish church, Wells

Harvey cites Wynford's southwest tower of Wells Cathedral as "the source of the typical 'Somerset Tower'... and the later concept of the spireless tower throughout this country." Harvey presumes that Wynford, who died in 1405, was directly involved in the design of St Cuthbert's parish church, a few blocks away from Wells cathedral, one sign of the spread of the Somerset tower into the surrounding countryside. Ultimately, however, Harvey concludes that what is needed to do a proper dating and sorting of the rich collection of medieval towers in Somerset is a team of history, document, and architecture experts to probe widely and deeply, amassing all the clues possible before constructing the definitive dating and systematics of the towers.

In the absence of such a definitive tower taxonomy, Poyntz Wright's dates and scheme – used and italicized on the related page, "List of Somerset towers" – should be held lightly.

== See also ==
- List of Somerset towers
- Towers in Somerset
- English Gothic architecture
