= St John's Church, Seaborough =

Church in Dorset, England

St John's Church
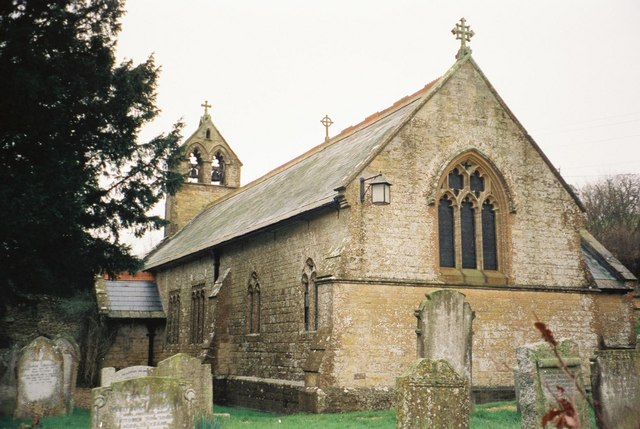

Religion
- Affiliation: Church of England
- Ecclesiastical or organizational status: Active
- Year consecrated: 1882

Location
- Location: Seaborough, Dorset, England
- Interactive map of St John's Church
- Coordinates: 50.8502°N 2.8110°W

Architecture
- Architect: George R. Crickmay
- Type: Church

St John's Church is a Church of England church in Seaborough, Dorset, England. Much of the church dates to a rebuild of 1882 and it now forms part of the Beaminster Area Team Ministry. The church is a Grade II listed building.

== History ==
=== 15th-century church ===
A church at Seaborough is known to have existed as early as the 13th century, with the first known rector being recorded in 1244. In 1415, John Golde, the owner of the manor and advowson of Seaborough, gave the rector Rev. John Threddar a plot of land to build a new church. The new church was subsequently built and a north transept was added in the late 15th-century, after the building had become too small for the congregation. In 1729–30, on account of the church's main body and roof being in poor condition, and the transept found to be defective, a new transept was built and the rest of the church was repaired, re-roofed and fitted with new seating.

In its final form, the church was made up of a nave, chancel, north transept and south porch. It had a gallery at the west end of the nave. A new harmonium was installed in the church on 11 January 1857. It cost £10 and was played for the first time by Mr. H. Cole, the organist of St John's in Yeovil.

=== 1882 restoration and rebuild ===
As early as 1876, the church was in a dilapidated state and its accommodation was also considered inadequate to serve the scattered population of the parish. A decision was made to rebuild, restore and enlarge the church. The plans were drawn up in 1880 by George R. Crickmay of Westminster and Weymouth, with accommodation provided for 59 adults and 21 children.

Funds were raised through the efforts of the rector of Seaborough, Rev. T. M. Shaw, and a number of supporters. Owing to the small size of the parish, an appeal was made for donations from further afield for "carrying out and completing this good and much-needed work". In June 1880, the Bath and Wells Diocesan Church Building Society granted £40 towards the project.

In October 1881, the tender of Mr. B. Chambers of Beaminster was accepted for rebuilding and restoring the church. In April 1882, Rev. Shaw was granted use of St Mary's at Drimpton to hold morning services on alternate Sundays for his parishioners. Work on St John's began soon after.

Much of St John's was rebuilt; both the chancel and west wall were completely rebuilt, as were parts of the north and south walls. The church was lengthened by around 22 feet through the addition of the new chancel. A vestry was added on the north side and a new porch on the south side, while the 1729 transept was retained. Three windows from the old church were reused and six new windows added.

When pulling down the old church's porch, a 13th-century effigy of a crusader was discovered, having been used as a lintel over the door. As the clergy and contractors were unaware of its existence, the effigy's head was damaged and the arms broken off. However, it was retained and placed in the transept. It is believed the effigy belongs to John Golde of Seaborough, a Somerset crusader who fought at the Siege of Damietta in 1219. In recognition of his service, he was granted an estate at Seaborough in 1229.

The cost of the work was initially expected to be £780 but unforeseen additional work saw the amount reach £980 in the end. With Mr. B. Chambers as the main contractor, W. A. Stoodley was the foreman of the works and Crickmay & Son supervised. Harry Hems of Exeter carried out the carved work. St John's and its burial ground were consecrated by the Bishop of Bath and Wells, the Right Rev. Lord Arthur Hervey, on 5 December 1882.

=== 20th and 21st-century repairs ===
In 1902, the church was repaired and reseated by Captain Ralph Cecil Batley of Seaborough Court. In 1988, the building was re-roofed and the bell-cot repaired and strengthened. In 2019, the church's two bells were restored by John Taylor & Co of Loughborough. They were rehung on new fittings and first used again on 29 September 2019.

== Architecture ==
St John's is built of local stone, with Hamstone dressings and roofs covered with slate. It is made up of a nave, chancel, north transept, north vestry and south porch. On the west gable is a bell-cot for two bells, and on the east gable is a stone cross. Internally the walls of the church are rough-stuccoed. The 1882 barrel-vaulted roof uses panelled and varnished red deal from Oslo.

The chancel arch of 1882 is supported by polished Devonshire marble columns, which rest on carved Bath stone corbels. The nave has two reset windows of 15th-century date; the one in the north wall is of three-lights and the one in the west wall of two-lights. The church's windows are filled with cathedral glass.

The nave's flooring is made up of wood blocks, laid diagonally. Much of the church's 1882 internal paving uses tiles from the potteries of W. Carter of Poole. Encaustic tiles from Maw & Co of Broseley were used in the chancel. The chancel steps are of Blue Pennant stone, as is the slab the altar rests on. During the 1882 work, seats of Oslo red deal were placed in the chancel area and the nave's old pews were replaced by chairs.

=== Fittings ===
The vestry has a communion table and coffin stool of 17th-century date. The effigy in the transept has been dated to the mid-13th century. The transept also contains a tablet and bust on a plinth to Adam Martin, dated 1738. The transept has a piscina formed from a shaft dating to the late 12th century. The church's two bells date to 1712 and were cast at Thomas Knight.

Many gifts were received as part of the 1882 work including an altar cloth presented by Mrs. Maynard Shaw, velvet drapery for the reredos by Miss Stephens, the lectern and hangings for the lectern and reading desk by Mrs. Joseph Studley, the brass cross and candlesticks by Mr. Edward Shaw (brother of the rector) and the carpet for the chancel steps by Mrs. Edward Shaw. The pulpit and font were retained from the old church.

In 1928, a stained glass window was installed in the transept in memory of William Rowland Mitchell of Seaborough Court (died in 1925) by his wife and sons. As the Bishop of Taunton was unable to carry out the dedication service in July 1928, duties were shared by Prebendary Langham (vicar of Crewkerne) and Rev. Canon Rowling (rector of Seaborough). The window was unveiled on the day of dedication by Lieutenant-Commander Mitchell and Lieutenant-Commander Pawlett.
