= St Bartholomew's Church, Crewkerne =

Church in Somerset, England

Church of St Bartholomew
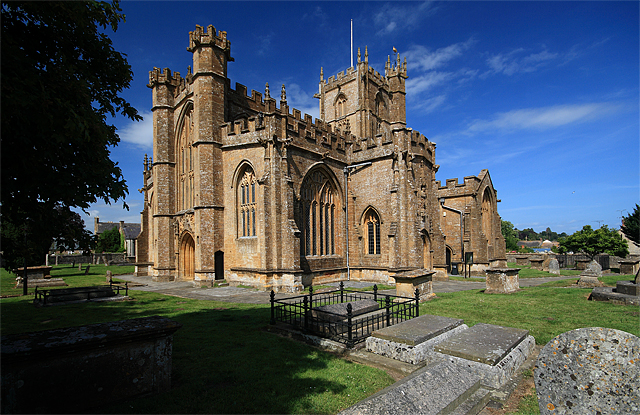

- Location within Somerset
- 50°53′06″N 2°47′53″W
- Location: Crewkerne, Somerset, England

History
- Built: 15th century

Listed Building – Grade I
- Official name: Church of St Bartholomew
- Designated: 12 June 1950
- Reference no.: 1208122

The Church of St Bartholomew in Crewkerne, Somerset, England dates from the 15th century and has been designated as a Grade I listed building.

St Bartholomew's Parish Church stands on high ground to the west of the town. The first Saxon church was founded before the end of the 9th century as a "minster", or main church of a Saxon royal estate that included an area which later became the parishes of Seaborough, Wayford and Misterton. This church was replaced after the Norman Conquest with a larger stone cruciform building, with a central tower. This was almost completely rebuilt and enlarged in the late 15th and early 16th centuries. This is, for the most part, the church building visible today. It is an excellent example of the Perpendicular style with many unusual and individual features. These include the west front, the nave, the six-light aisle windows and the Tudor-style chapels and windows in the north east corner. The building material is golden-coloured Ham Hill stone, quarried a few miles north of Crewkerne. There is a notable pair of 'green man' carvings within the church.

No major alterations have been made since the Reformation in the 1530s and 1540s, but there have been many changes to the interior to accommodate various phases of Church of England worship. Among these are an oven used for baking communion bread in the south east corner of the north chapel.

During the Civil War, considerable damage was done including the destruction of nearly all of the medieval stained glass. William III of England worshipped in the church following his landing in the Glorious Revolution of 1689. By the early 19th century, all the medieval furnishings, except the Norman font had disappeared. New pews were made and the west galleries were added in 1808–11. The latest restoration that has left the church interior visible today, took place in the late 19th century; it was more sympathetic to the church's architectural character than many Victorian restorations. At this time, the central section of the west gallery was removed to reveal the great west window and the organ was relocated to the south transept. The pews date from around 1900 and have attractive carved bench-ends.

Christ Church, a chapel of ease to St Bartholomew's, was built on South Street in 1852–54 to the designs of James Mountford Allen. The church was declared redundant in 1969, and demolished in 1975 to make way for the residential Christchurch Court.

== Former grammar school ==
The church hall and parish office in Abbey Street, a building which stands immediately north of the church, dates from 1636. It was used by Crewkerne Grammar School (founded 1499) from then until 1882, when the school moved to a new building called de Combe House on Mount Pleasant.

== See also ==
- List of Grade I listed buildings in South Somerset
- List of towers in Somerset
- List of ecclesiastical parishes in the Diocese of Bath and Wells
