= James Mountford Allen =

English architect

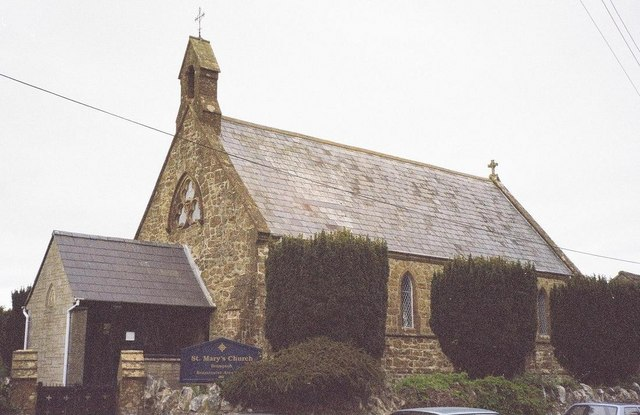
St Mary's Church, Drimpton, seen in 1999. It was designed by James Mountford Allen.

James Mountford Allen (14 August 1809, Crewkerne, Somerset – 1883, St Pancras, London) was an English architect.

Allen was the son of Rev. John Allen, vicar of Bleddington, Gloucestershire, and formerly the master of Crewkerne Grammar School, Somersetshire. After studying architecture for five years at Exeter under Mr. Cornish, he came to London at the age of 21, worked for some time in Mr. Fowler's office, and settled down into general practice till he was 47, when he returned to Crewkerne. There he carried on an extensive practice as a church architect till his death in 1883. A considerable number of churches, rectory-houses, and schools, either new or restored, passed through his hands, in addition to gentlemen's residences. The little Church of St Mary Magdalene at Cricket Malherbie, near Ilminster, is much admired, and the reredos at Chardstock is well known and has been reproduced in other churches in the neighbourhood.

== Churches ==
- Christ Church, Crewkerne, 1854
- St Mary's Church, Drimpton, 1867
