= Church of St Michael, Wayford =

Church in Somerset, England

Church of St Michael
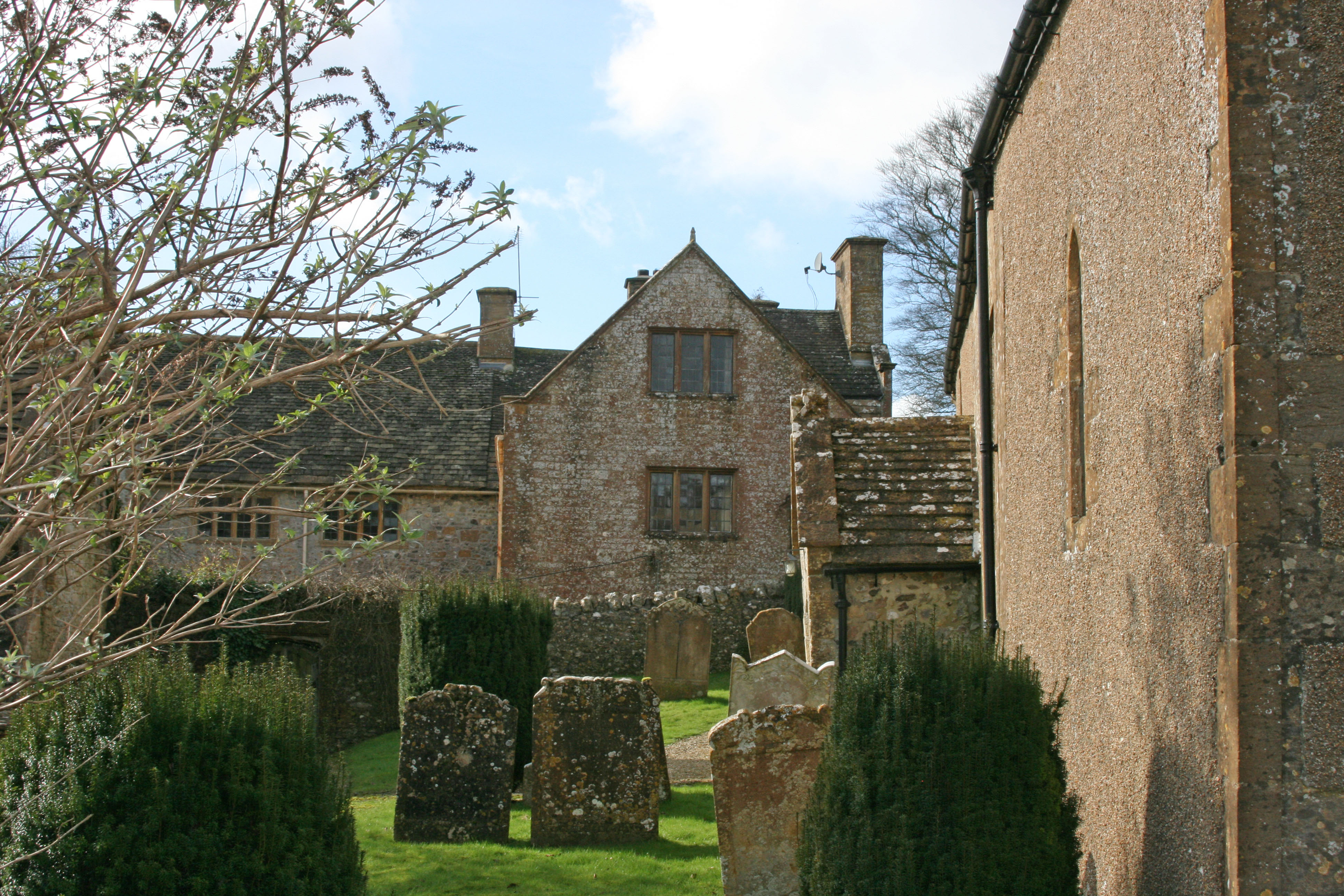
- The church on the right and Wayford Manor House

- Location within Somerset
- 50.8563°N 2.8470°W
- Location: Wayford, Somerset, England

History
- Built: 13th century

Listed Building – Grade II*
- Official name: Church of St Michael
- Designated: 4 February 1958
- Reference no.: 1056166

The Anglican Church of St Michael in Wayford, Somerset, England was built in the 13th century. It is a Grade II* listed building.

== History ==
The church was built in the 13th century and was remodelled in the 18th, 19th and early 20th centuries. Work in 1800 involved rebuilding the front wall and that of 1846 was required after part of the chancel collapsed. The porch was added in 1602. There was a gallery at the west end of the church but this has been removed.

The parish is part of the Wulfic benefice within the Diocese of Bath and Wells.

== Architecture ==
The stone building has hamstone dressings and slate roofs with a small wooden bell turret at the western end. with two bells. It has a three-bay nave, single-bay chancel and north aisle.

Inside the church is a 14th-century double piscina. The font may also date from the 14th century.

== See also ==
- List of ecclesiastical parishes in the Diocese of Bath and Wells
