= St Mary's Church, Drimpton =

Church in Drimpton, Dorset, England

St Mary's Church
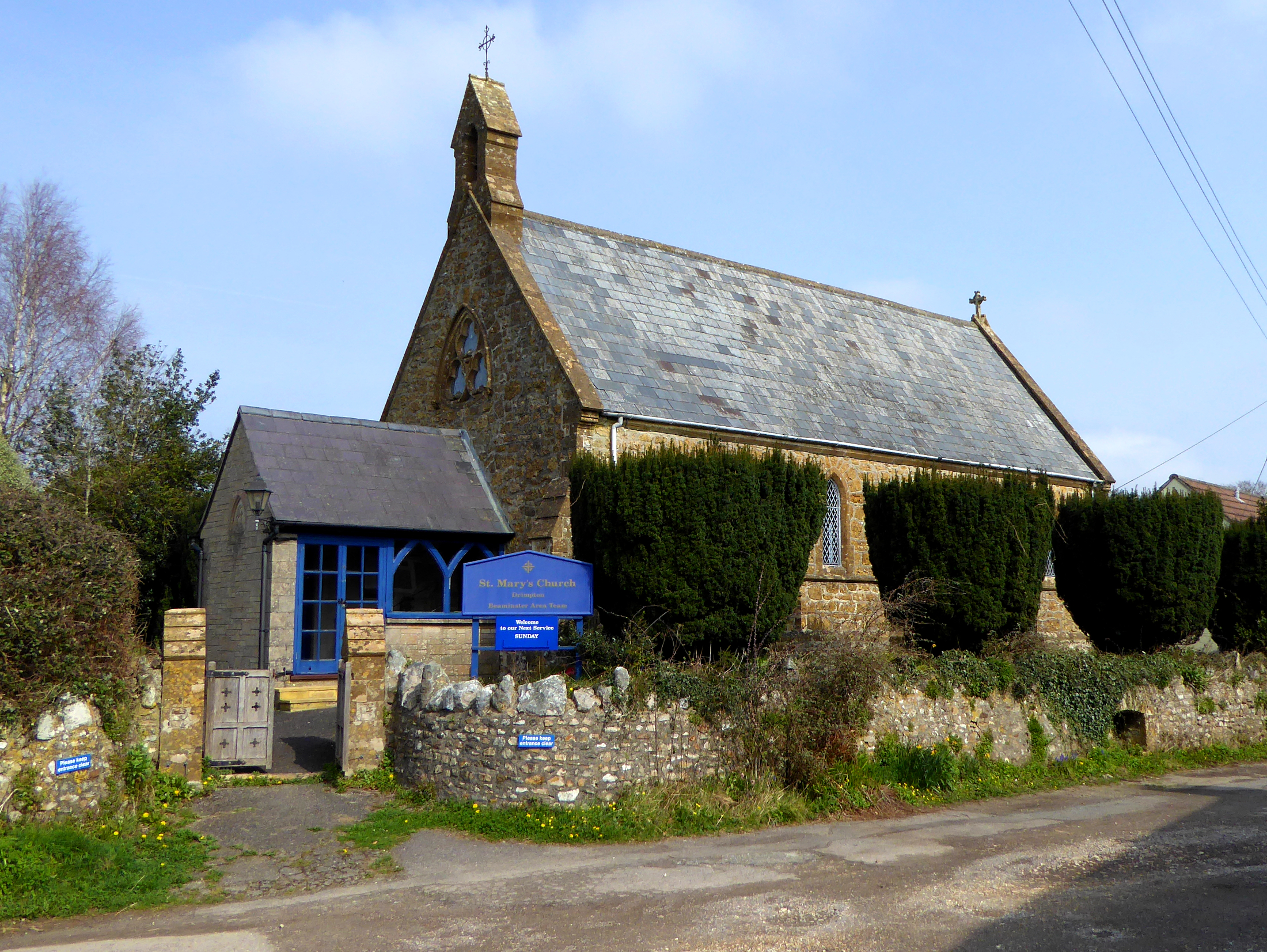

Religion
- Affiliation: Church of England
- Ecclesiastical or organizational status: Active
- Year consecrated: 1867

Location
- Location: Drimpton, Dorset, England
- Interactive map of St Mary's Church
- Coordinates: 50.8419°N 2.8254°W

Architecture
- Architect: James Mountford Allen
- Type: Church

St. Mary's Church is a Church of England church in Drimpton, Dorset, England. The church opened in 1867 and now forms part of the Beaminster Area Team Ministry.

== History ==
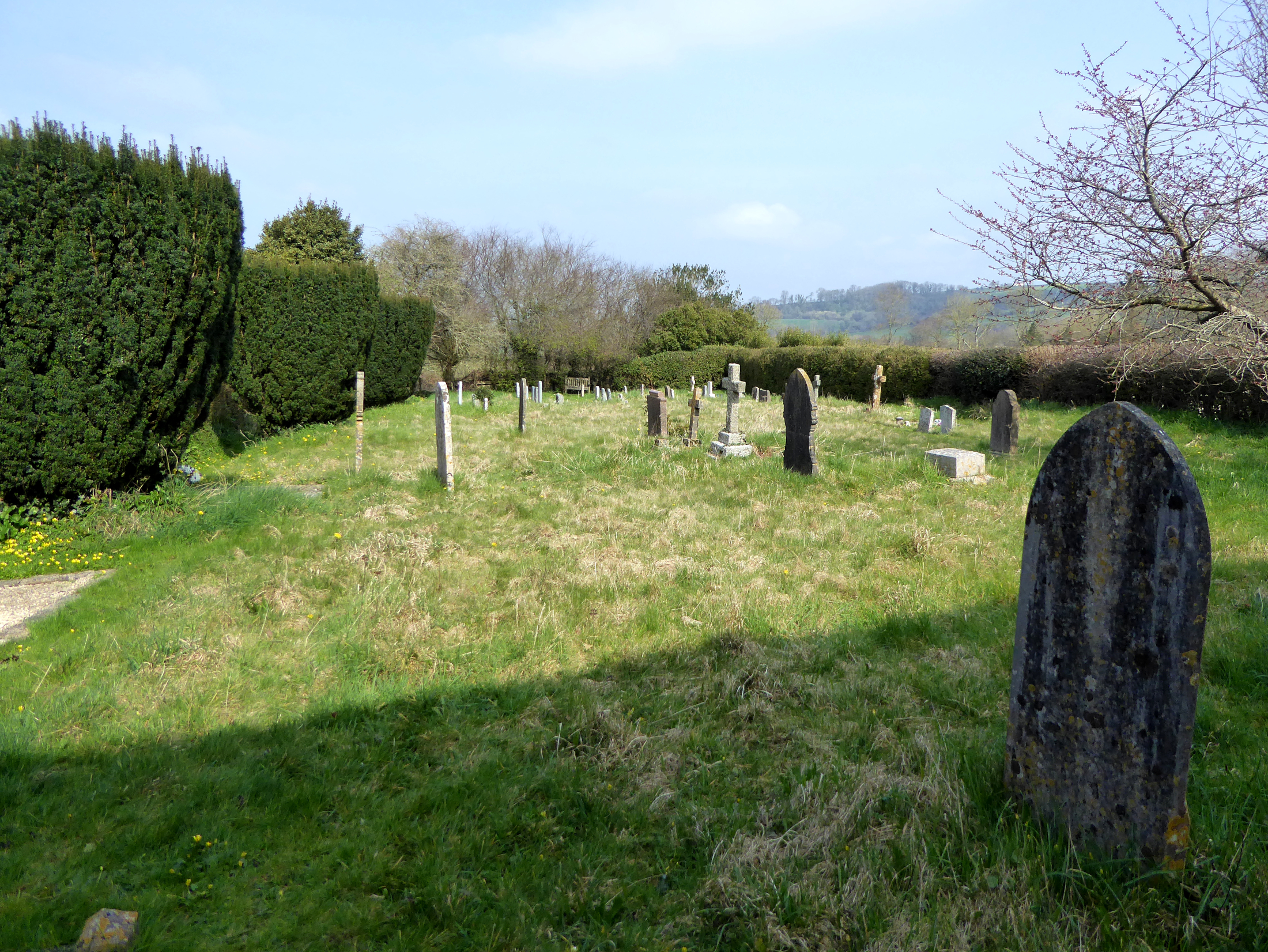
The burial ground of St Mary's.

St Mary's was built as a chapel of ease to the parish church of St John the Baptist in Broadwindsor. Owing to the church's two mile distance from the village, Rev. Solomon Caesar Malan had expressed his wish for a chapel of ease to serve Drimpton and its surrounding hamlets since he became vicar of the parish in 1845. The vicar raised the necessary funds by public subscription, which mostly came from local residents and friends of the vicar. One donor was Richard Chenevix Trench, the Archbishop of Dublin. The local landowner Captain Spurwey of Catherstone, Charmouth gifted the stone required to construct the church from a quarry on his estate, which was hauled to the site by local farmers.

The plans for the church were drawn up by James Mountford Allen of Crewkerne in 1863 and Mr. Holt of Broadwindsor was hired as the builder. Construction began in 1863 but its completion was delayed when the builder began working to his own plans in favour of Allen's and without the knowledge or consent of Rev. Malan. The contract was handed over to Mr. John Chick of Beaminster and the existing work that did not match Allen's original design was removed and redone.

St Mary's was consecrated by the Bishop of Salisbury, Rt. Rev. Walter Kerr Hamilton, on 21 July 1867. Public admission was by ticket to avoid overcrowding and the Bishop later travelled to the parish church at Broadwindsor to preach during an afternoon service. The evening service at St Mary's was described by the Dorset County Chronicle as "crammed to suffocation". 27 infants and older children were put forward for baptising, however only 16 could be achieved during the service's duration.

The church's burial ground was extended in 1932.

== Architecture ==
St Mary's is built of local stone, with dressings in Ham stone, sourced from the quarries of Mr. John Trask of Norton-sub-Hamdon, in the Early English style. The windows and door head were constructed with overhead arches of red stone from Bishops Lydeard. Designed to accommodate up to 90 persons, the church is made up of a nave and chancel. It was built with four single-light lancet-headed windows on each side, a three-light window at the east end and a small window of three trefoils above the entrance. The north and south sides of the church are strengthened with buttresses, while the west end gable contains a bellcote of Ham stone with one bell and surmounted by a wrought iron cross. The church's porch was added in the mid-20th century.

The internal fittings, including the open-timbered roof, pulpit, reading desk and benches, were made of stained and varnished Dantzic fir. After World War I, a wooden war memorial was attached to the church wall in remembrance of the seven local men who lost their lives in the conflict.
