= West Crewkerne =

Civil parish in Somerset, England

Coordinates: 50.857°N 2.832°W

- Clapton Mill

- Location within Somerset
- Population: 523 (Parish, 2021)
- Civil parish: West Crewkerne
- Unitary authority: Somerset
- Ceremonial county: Somerset
- Region: South West
- Country: England
- Sovereign state: United Kingdom
- Post town: Crewkerne
- Postcode district: TA18

West Crewkerne is a civil parish in Somerset, England. It covers a rural area to the west of the town of Crewkerne, and contains the settlements of Clapton, Coombe, Henley, Hewish, and Woolminstone. At the 2021 census, the parish had a population of 523.

== History ==
The West Crewkerne area was historically part of the ancient parish of Crewkerne in the Crewkerne Hundred of Somerset. A chapel of ease called the Church of the Good Shepherd was built in 1868 at Hewish to serve the western part of the parish.

Church of the Good Shepherd, Hewish

When elected parish and district councils were established under the Local Government Act 1894, it was decided that the town of Crewkerne should be governed as an urban district, but that the whole parish was not suitable for being an urban district. The more rural parts of the parish were therefore made a separate civil parish called West Crewkerne. West Crewkerne parish initially included a detached exclave north-east of Crewkerne town; the exclave was transferred to the parish of Merriott in 1933.

Although a separate civil parish since 1894, the area remains part of the Church of England ecclesiastical parish of Crewkerne.

== Governance ==
There are two tiers of local government covering West Crewkerne, at parish and unitary authority level: West Crewkerne Parish Council and Somerset Council. The parish council meets at Clapton Village Hall.
