= Gary Mortimer =

British journalist and balloonist

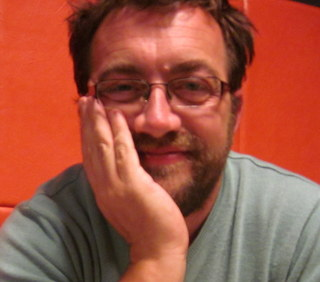
- Gary Mortimer
- Born: 26 September 1967 (age 58); Bristol, United Kingdom
- Citizenship: British
- Occupation: CEO sUAS News Group

Gary Mortimer (born 1967) is a British journalist, balloonist, and drone aviator. He serves as editor of sUAS News, an unmanned aviation news website. He is a hot air balloon pilot and current holder of the South African Hot Air Balloon Altitude record. The record was set on 9 May 2005, when he flew to an altitude of 30,334 feet (9,246 m) with DJ Lev David, on a flight in the KwaZulu-Natal region of South Africa. The flight took off from Estcourt Airfield, and the landing took place just outside Weenan.

He lives in the KwaZulu Natal Midlands and works on projects involving Unmanned Aircraft Systems (UAS).

In 2010 with Chris Anderson, Mortimer created the T3 competition on the popular drone building website DIY Drones. He remains the chief judge for the competition. In July 2010, he was the first person to fly a fixed wing unmanned aircraft at the Farnborough Airshow in Hampshire, England. He flew the Boomerang wing with an AttoPilot autopilot inside.

== Personal life ==
He lived in the Somerset village of Dowlish Wake and attended Wadham Community School in Crewkerne.

He served in the RAF from 1984 to 1988 in Chivenor No. 63 Squadron RAF and RAF Prestwick.
