= Drimpton =

Village in Dorset, England

Coordinates: 50.8418°N 2.8275°W

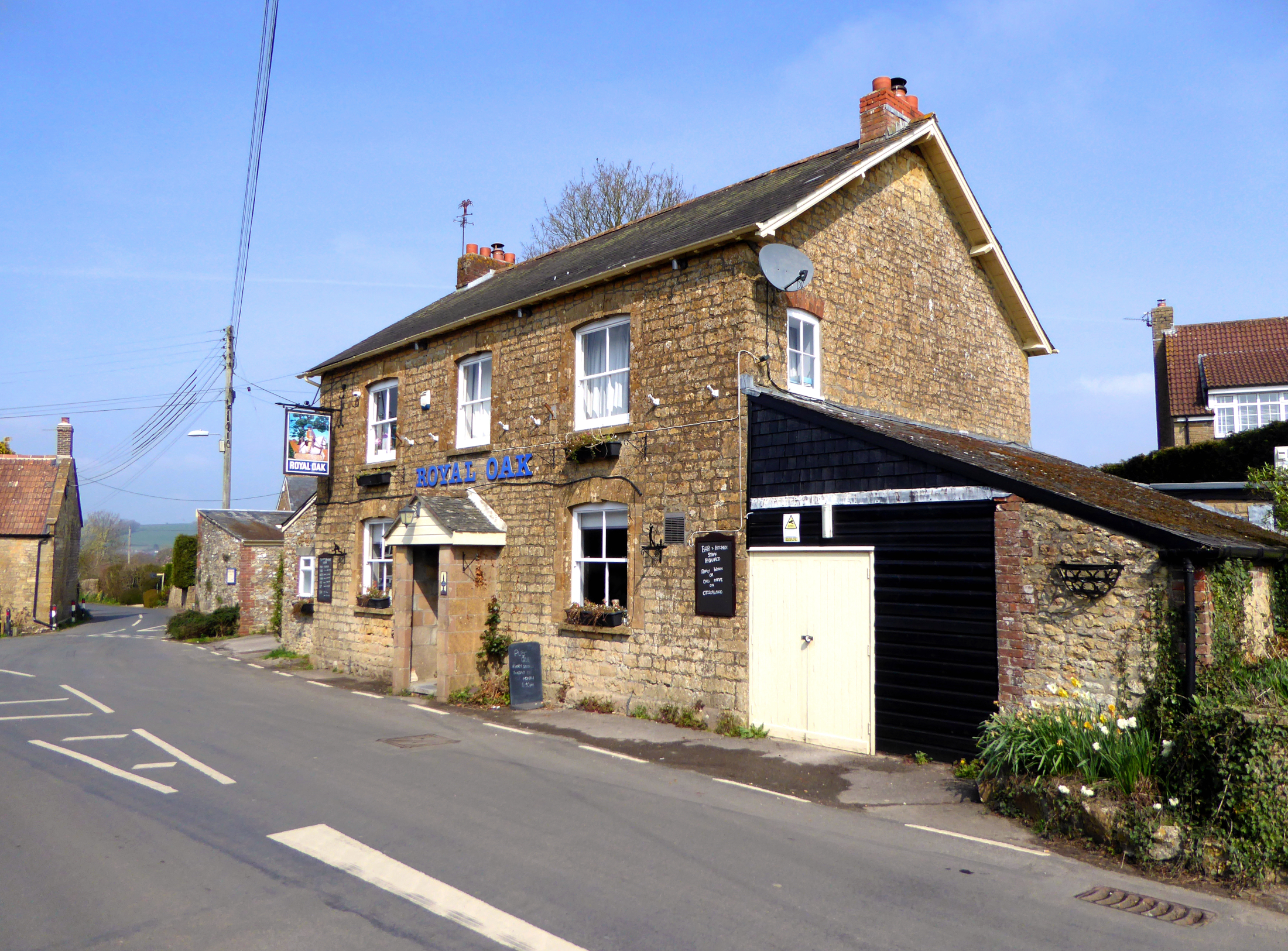
- The Royal Oak public house at Drimpton

- Location within Dorset
- OS grid reference: ST418050
- Unitary authority: Dorset
- Ceremonial county: Dorset
- Region: South West
- Country: England
- Sovereign state: United Kingdom
- Police: Dorset
- Fire: Dorset and Wiltshire
- Ambulance: South Western
- UK Parliament: West Dorset

Drimpton is a village in the English county of Dorset, situated approximately 5 miles (8.0 km) northwest of Beaminster and 3.5 miles (5.6 km) southwest of Crewkerne in Somerset. It lies within the civil parish of Broadwindsor.

Drimpton is sited on a small tributary of the River Axe which was unnamed until 2005 when, after a vote by villagers, it was officially named the "Little Axe". Neighbouring settlements include Clapton, Seaborough, Blackdown, Kittwhistle, Broadwindsor and Burstock. Greenham and Netherhay are small hamlets virtually contiguous with Drimpton. At Greenham there was once a flax mill, part of which still survives. Three books, chronicling life in the area, have recently been compiled; the project was called 'Village Voices'.

Netherhay Bridge, which carries Crewkerne Road over the Little Axe, was built by J & D Gale of Allington and is dated 1829. The Chard Road crosses the Little Axe by a single-span bridge, which forms part of the B3162 road, and which was built in 2003. The former Drimpton Toll House is located on Bridport Road (B3162).

== History ==
Traditionally many of Drimpton's inhabitants worked in the agricultural industry, with Drimpton, Lower Drimpton, and Bridge Farms in the locality. During the 19th century, Greenham Mill was a major employer in the area. The mill was built about half a mile west of Drimpton in 1824. It closed in 1923 and was sold in 1931. By the 1950s, the main mill building was being used by Beaminster firm Cow and Gate for the storage of dried milk powder, and then Lockyer and Sons, who operated the nearby Clapton Mill, used the building for storing grain. The building was demolished in 1980. By 1931, the roadside warehouse was occupied by the haulage firm Rendell and Read. Cosipet transformed the building into a factory making pet products in 1986 and they continue to operate there.

== Amenities ==
The village has two places of worship: the Anglican parish church of St Mary's and the Netherhay Methodist Chapel. St Mary's was built as a chapel of ease to the parish church of St John the Baptist in Broadwindsor and opened in 1867. The Methodist chapel was built in 1838. A school serving up to 100 mixed pupils was opened in 1874 and enlarged in 1886. It closed in 1968 and the pupils were then bussed to the newly built school at Broadwindsor. It is now a private residence, the Old School House.

Drimpton Village Hall was opened by Mr. A. R. Hayward of Misterton on 20 December 1923. It was erected by Messrs. Wakely Bros of Broadwindsor to the specifications of Mr. L. Clarke of West Chinnock. A concert and dance was held on its opening day.

The village shop and post office (4 Chard Road) closed in 1993.

=== Royal Oak ===
The Royal Oak is the village's pub and is owned by Palmers Brewery. The original thatched pub was purchased by the brewery in 1890. It suffered a major fire later that year on 15 October, which broke out in a chimney and left the building as "a heap of ruins". The pub was subsequently rebuilt in 1891–92 and reoccupied in late 1892.

Drimpton once had a second pub, the New Inn, which closed in 1958 and is now a private residence, the Pin House.

== Grade II listed buildings ==
- Bridge Farmhouse – detached farmhouse of early 19th century date
- Haydon Villa – detached villa of early 19th century date
- The Yews – detached house of circa mid-18th century date

== Gallery ==
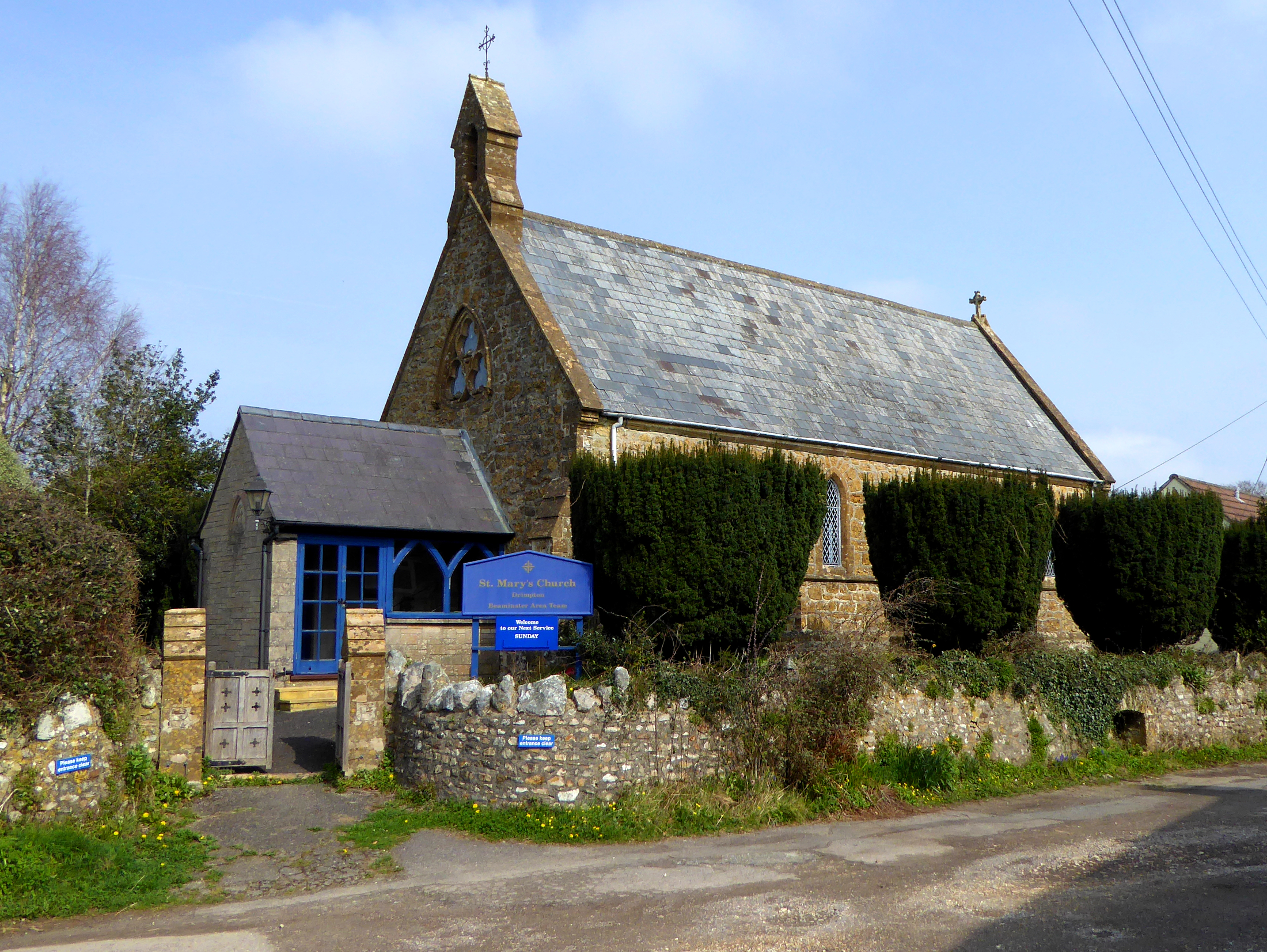
St Mary's Church

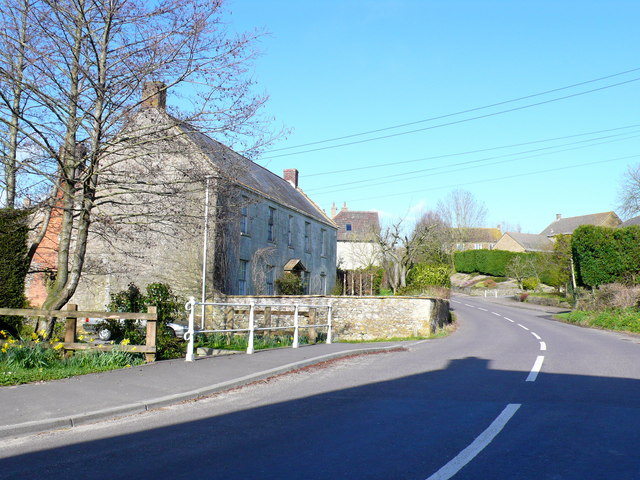
Haydon Villa and Chard Road

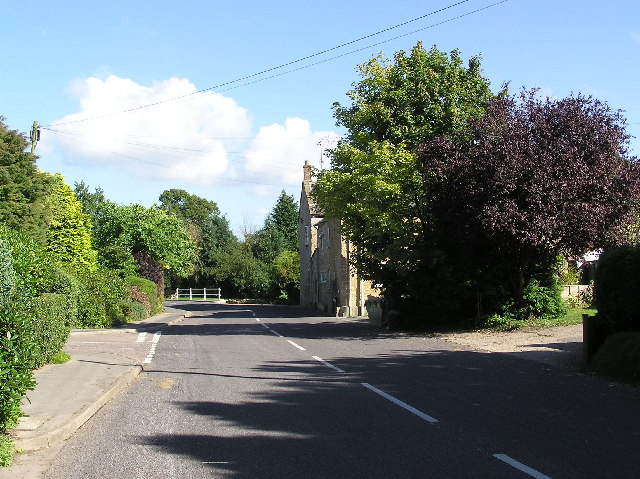
Chard Road

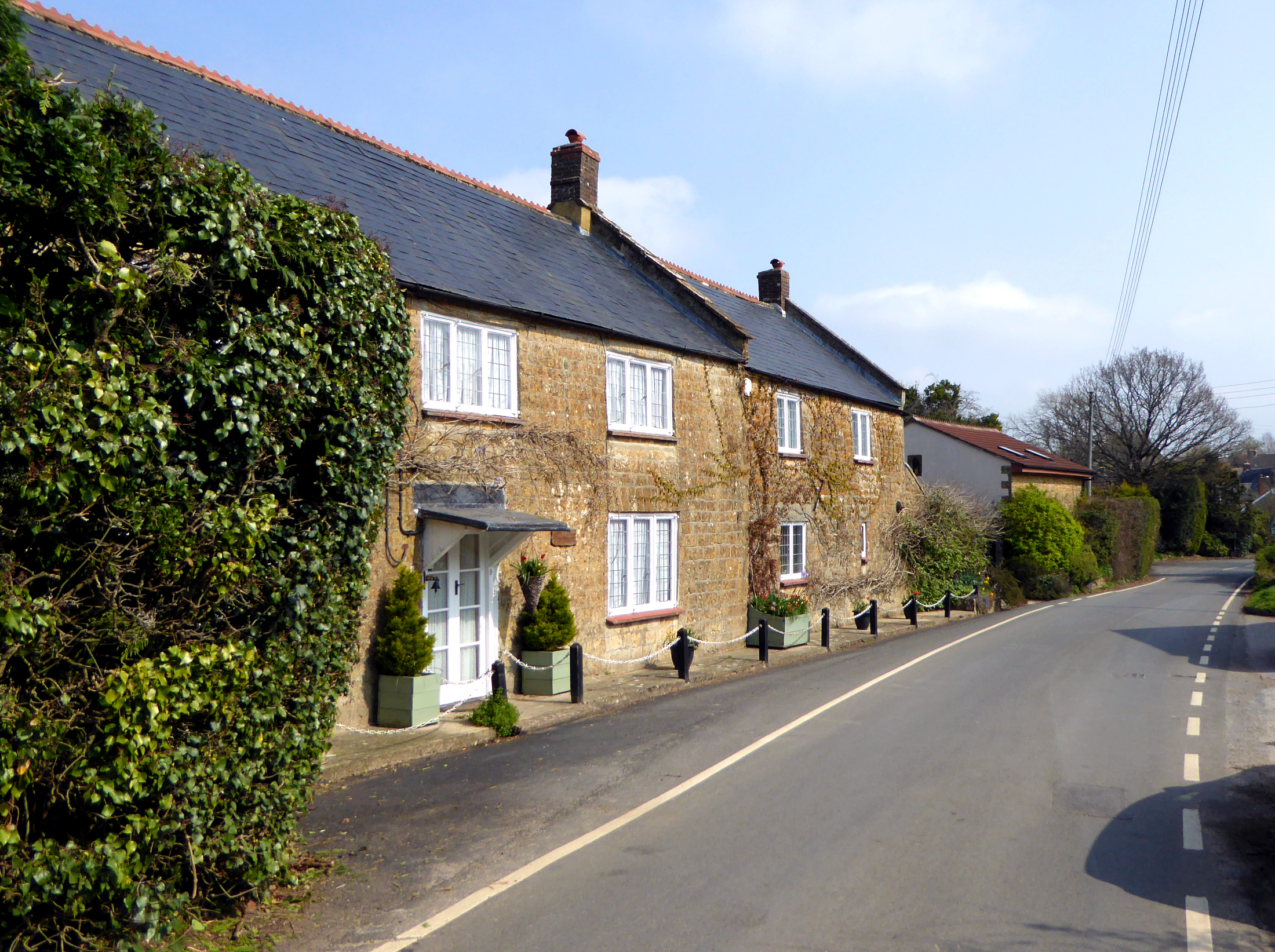
The former New Inn, now the Pin House

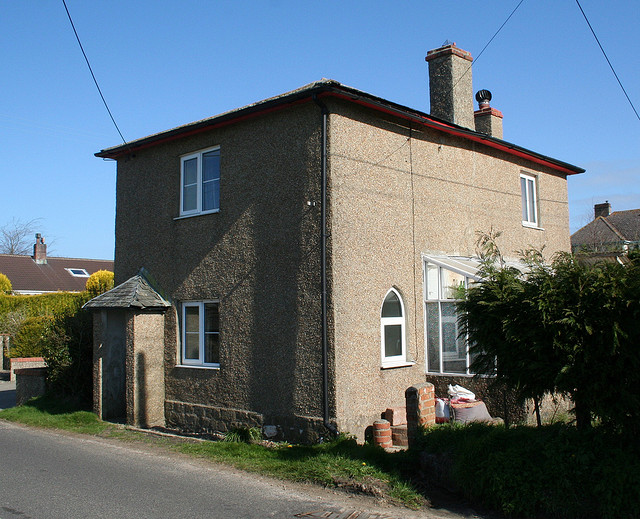
The former toll house on Bridport Road
