= Wadham School =

Location
- Yeovil Road; Crewkerne, Somerset, TA18 7NT; England
- 50°53′18″N 2°47′09″W

Information
- Type: Voluntary controlled school
- Motto: 'Making opportunities to learn and achieve'
- Religious affiliation: Church of England
- Established: 1971
- Local authority: Somerset County Council
- Department for Education URN: 123893 Tables
- Ofsted: Reports
- Head teacher: Richard Burgas
- Age: 11 to 16
- Enrolment: 770 pupils
- Publication: Wadham Words Wadham Quill
- Website: http://www.wadhamschool.co.uk/

Wadham School is a school for pupils aged 11–18 situated on a 20-acre (81,000 m^{2}) site on the outskirts of Crewkerne in Somerset, England. The school has been rated Good by Ofsted since May 2014.

== School site ==
Wadham School opened in purpose built accommodation in 1971, as a Church of England, Voluntary Controlled, Upper Comprehensive, replacing the local former grammar school building.

== Links with middle schools ==
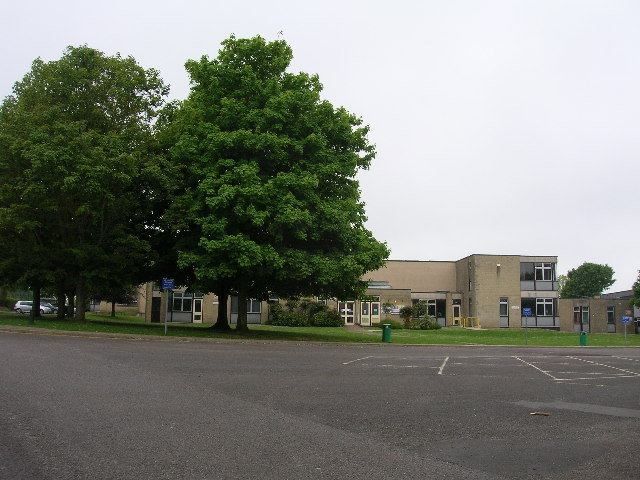
Wadham Community School

Wadham School receives pupils from two Middle Schools (ages 9–13), Maiden Beech in Crewkerne and Swanmead in Ilminster.

== Ofsted: Special Measures ==
In November 2005, Wadham was placed into Special measures after failing an Ofsted inspection. In June 2007 Wadham successfully left Special Measures, after a full Ofsted inspection showed the school had sufficiently progressed.

== Notable former pupils ==
- Gary Mortimer, hot air balloon pilot
- David Darling, video game designer
