= Michael Barnwell =

English cricketer

Personal information
- Full name: Lionel Michael Lowry Barnwell
- Born: 12 August 1943 (age 83); Crewkerne, Somerset, England
- Batting: Right-handed
- Bowling: Right-arm medium

Domestic team information
- Years: Team
- 1965–1966: Cambridge University
- 1967–1968: Somerset
- 1969/70–1970/71: Eastern Province
- FC debut: 22 May 1965 Cambridge Univ. v New Zealanders
- Last FC: 1 January 1971 Eastern Province v Natal
- Only LA: 7 November 1970 Eastern Province v Orange Free State

Career statistics
Competition	First-class	List A
Matches	19	1
Runs scored	612	124
Batting average	19.74	124.00
100s/50s	0/2	1/0
Top score	74	124
Balls bowled	400	0
Wickets	3	–
Bowling average	64.66	–
5 wickets in innings	0	–
10 wickets in match	0	–
Best bowling	1/11	–
Catches/stumpings	10/–	1/–
- Source: CricketArchive, 8 December 2012

Lionel Michael Lowry Barnwell (born 12 August 1943) is an English former first-class cricketer who played for Cambridge University, Somerset and Eastern Province.

A nephew of John Barnwell, who played cricket for Somerset before and after the Second World War, Michael Barnwell was born at Crewkerne and educated at Repton School and Christ's College, Cambridge.

He gained a Blue for Cambridge University in the Varsity Soccer game at Wembley on 5 December 1964.

At cricket, Barnwell was a middle-order right-handed batsman and an occasional right-arm medium-pace bowler. After captaining the first XI at Repton in 1963, he played four times for Cambridge University in 1965 and 1966 without gaining a regular place, and six times for Somerset in 1967 and 1968. His only seasons of regular first-class cricket were for Eastern Province in South Africa when he opened the innings for a side that included the Pollock brothers and Tony Greig. His one century in top-class cricket came in his only List A match: 124 against Orange Free State in the quarter-final of the Gillette Cup in 1970–71. He left first-class cricket at the end of the 1970–71 season.

Barnwell joined the Royal Air Force Secretarial Branch and received the Sword of Merit at the conclusion of his officer training in 1975. From 1976 to 1981, he played in and often captained the Combined Services teams that played the National Cricket Association's Young Cricketers teams in one-day matches at Lord's.
