= John Barnwell (disambiguation) =

John Barnwell (born 1938) is an English football player and manager

John Barnwell may also refer to:

- John Barnwell (colonist) (1671–1724), Irish-born settler of South Carolina, an Indian-fighter known as "Tuscarora Jack"
- John Barnwell (cricketer) (1914–1998), English cricketer
- John Barnwell (senator) (1748–1800), American soldier and public official from South Carolina during the American Revolution
