= Church of St Mary Magdalene, Cricket Malherbie =

Church in Somerset, England

Church of St Mary Magdalene
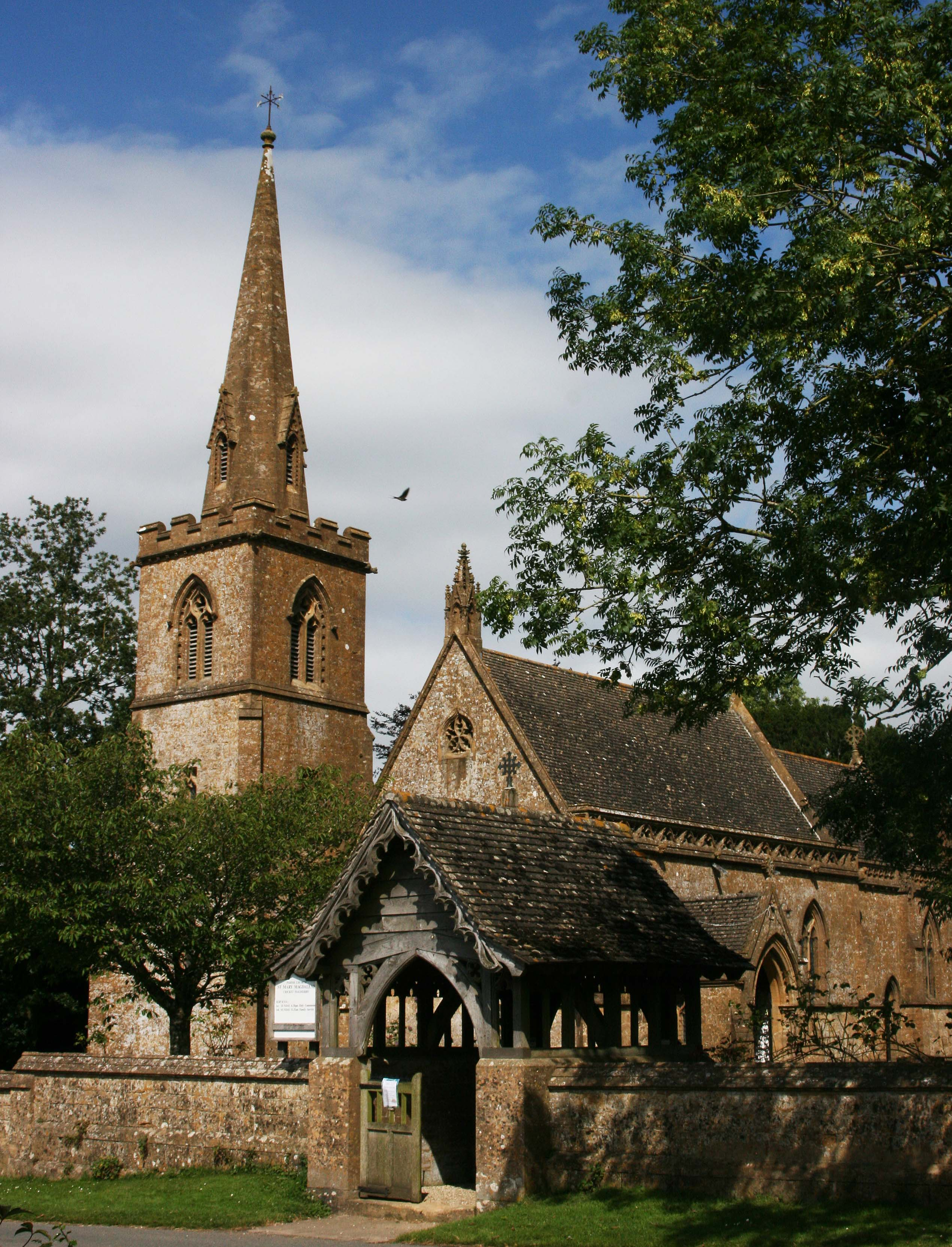

- Location within Somerset
- 50.8998°N 2.9096°W
- Location: Cricket Malherbie, Somerset, England

History
- Built: 12th century. Rebuilt 1855

Listed Building – Grade II*
- Official name: Church of St Mary Magdalen
- Designated: 4 February 1958
- Reference no.: 1177461

The Anglican Church of St Mary Magdalene in Cricket Malherbie, Somerset, England was built in the 12th century and rebuilt in 1855. It is a Grade II* listed building.

== History ==
A church was built on the site in the 12th century however it was rebuilt around 1855. The rebuilding work was instigated by the Rev James Mountford Allen who was the curate of the church and headmaster of Ilminster Grammar School.

It now serves as the parish church for Knowle St Giles where the former Church of St Giles is no longer consecrated and has been converted into a private house. The parish is part of the Two Shires benefice within the Diocese of Bath and Wells.

== Architecture ==
The hamstone building has clay tiled roofs behind parapets. It consists of a three-bay nave, two-bay chancel and north transept. The three-stage tower is supported by corner buttresses and topped with a spire.

The interior fittings including tomb memorials are from the mid 19th century.

The boundary wall and lychgate were added in the 1850s.

== See also ==
- List of ecclesiastical parishes in the Diocese of Bath and Wells
