= Millwater =

- Site of Special Scientific Interest
- Location within Somerset
- Location of Millwater.
- Area of search: Somerset
- Grid reference: ST439100
- Coordinates: 50.88675°N 2.79890°W
- Interest: Biological
- Area: 1.4 hectares (0.014 km^{2}; 0.0054 sq mi)
- Notification date: 1989

Millwater (grid reference ST439100) is a 1.4 hectare (3.5 acre) biological Site of Special Scientific Interest at Crewkerne in Somerset, notified in 1989.

Millwater consists of a complex mosaic of pasture, wet grassland, tall-herb fen, standing and running water, alder and willow carr. The invertebrate fauna of the site has been extremely well documented and 1744 species have been recorded in the period 1978-1988 including many nationally scarce species in a wide range of groups. Seventy-six bird species have been recorded on the site. Of these, twenty-eight species are known to breed including sedge warbler (Acrocephalus schoenobaenus), reed warbler (Acrocephalus scirpaceus), and reed bunting (Emberiza schoeniclus) which are characteristic inhabitants of tall herb fen and carr vegetation.
