= John Gould (of Seaborough) =

Member of the Parliament of England

John Gould (fl. 1391), of Dorchester, Dorset and Seaborough, Somerset, was an English attorney and politician who sat in the House of Commons of England in 1391.

Gould was the son of Robert Gould of Seaborough. He became an attorney and was involved in conveyancing and other land matters. He married his wife Joan before 1401.

Gould was returned as Member of Parliament (MP) for Dorchester in 1391. In December 1407, he was appointed tax collector for Somerset, but was too busy as an attorney to carry out his duties. In April 1408 he was appointed bailiff of Dorchester Rich for a year. He was a patron of the church at Seaborough and he granted a plot of his land to the church in November 1414.

Gould died sometime before September 1428 when some of his lands were sold.
