= Crewkerne and District Museum =

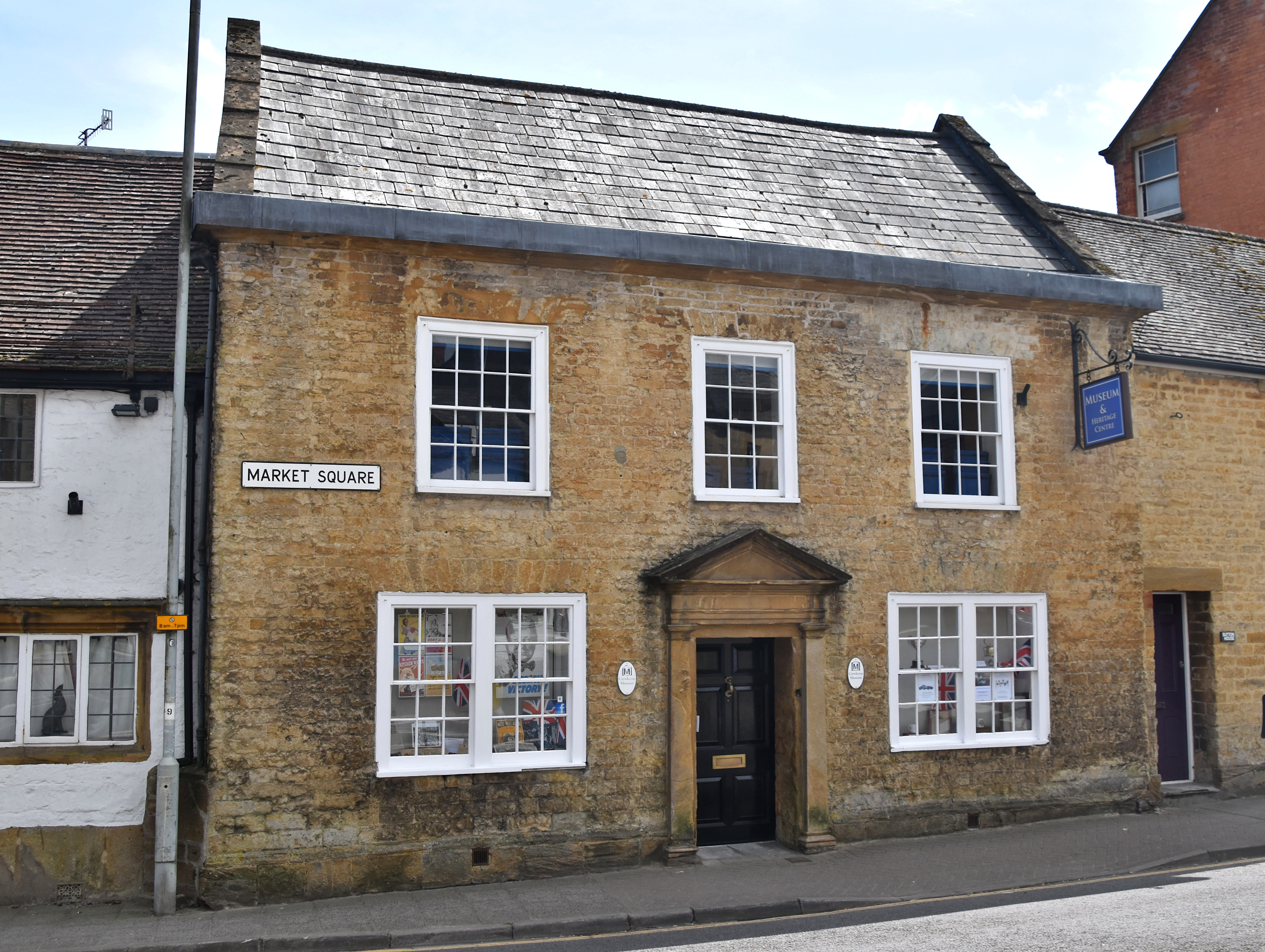

- Location within Somerset
- Established: 2000
- Location: Crewkerne, Somerset, England
- Coordinates: 50.8854°N 2.7951°W
- Type: Local museum
- President: Roger Rousell
- Website: Museum web site

Crewkerne and District Museum is a small local museum in Crewkerne, Somerset, England. It is part of a wider heritage centre which includes local archives and a meeting room.

The museum opened in 2000 in an old house with an 18th-century frontage. It was restored with the help of grants from the Heritage Lottery Fund, Somerset County Council, South Somerset District Council and Crewkerne Town Council.

The development of Crewkerne during the 18th and 19th centuries, with particular emphasis on the flax and linen industry is illustrated with a permanent display. Other collections relate to local archaeology, Coins and Medals, Costume and Textiles, Fine Art, Music, Personalities, Science and Technology, Social History, Weapons and War.

In the summer of 2010 a travelling exhibition Treasures from the Earth was hosted by the museum, with a series of archaeology themed events. Local materials, specific to Crewkerene were added including Roman coins and brooches and information on and pictures of the mosaics found at nearby Lopen and Dinnington.
