= Crewkerne Town Hall =

Municipal building in Crewkerne, Somerset, England

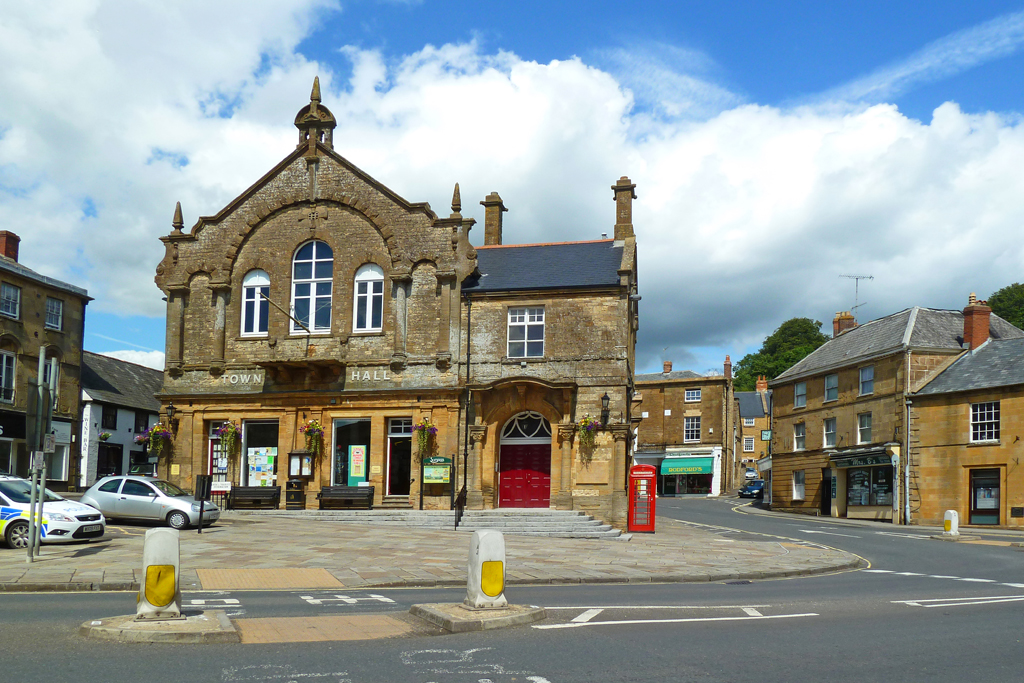
- Crewkerne Town Hall

- Shown in Somerset
- 50.8850°N 2.7956°W
- Location: Market Square, Crewkerne

History
- Built: 1742

Site notes
- Architectural style: Neoclassical style

Listed Building – Grade II
- Official name: Victoria Hall
- Designated: 6 September 1974
- Reference no.: 1281919

Crewkerne Town Hall is a municipal building in the Market Square in Crewkerne, Somerset, England. The building, which is the meeting place of Crewkerne Town Council, is a Grade II listed building.

== History ==
The first municipal building in the town was a structure known as the shambles which accommodated a series of butchers' stalls and dated back at least to the early 16th century. By the early 18th century the shambles was dilapidated and civic leaders decided to rebuild it: the remodelled structure was designed in the neoclassical style, built with hamstone rubble masonry and was completed in 1742.

The original design involved a symmetrical main frontage with two bays facing south onto the Market Square; the building was arcaded on the ground floor so that markets could be held with the main hall, reached by a wide staircase, on the first floor. The side elevations extended back four bays with sash windows on the first floor. The remains of the earlier structure was demolished to create a piazza in front of the building in 1836 and the building was refitted with a museum, reading room and library for the newly-formed Literary and Scientific Institute in 1849. The main hall was also used as a courtroom for county court and magistrates' court hearings in the 19th century.

In the late-19th century a group of local businessmen formed a company known as the "Crewkerne Fair and Markets Company" to raise finance for the remodelling of the building as part of the celebrations for the Diamond Jubilee of Queen Victoria. The work was carried out to a design by Thomas Benson of Yeovil and re-opened as the "Victoria Hall" in 1900. On the ground floor, there were two shop windows flanked by Tuscan order pilasters supporting a cornice and, on the first floor there was a tall round headed window and two shorter round headed windows flanked by Romanesque style columns supporting a wide stone arch. At roof level, there was a stepped gable with a central engaged pendant and three finials and, behind, a turret containing a bell. The building also incorporated a lower wing, to the right, with a doorway flanked by Corinthian order columns supporting a canopy on the ground floor and a casement window on the first floor. Internally, the principal room remained the main hall which featured a barrel vaulted ceiling.

The main hall was converted for use as a cinema and became known as the "Peoples Picture Palace", operating under the management of Thomas Stembridge and showing silent films from 1917 to 1921. Crewkerne Urban District Council acquired the building from the Crewkerne Fair and Markets Company in 1956 and, following local government re-organisation in 1974, the town hall became the meeting place of Crewkerne Town Council. A local information centre was also established in the building. Queen Elizabeth II, accompanied by the Duke of Edinburgh, visited the town hall on their journey to Exeter on 2 May 2012.
