= Christ Church, Crewkerne =

Church in Somerset, England

Christ Church
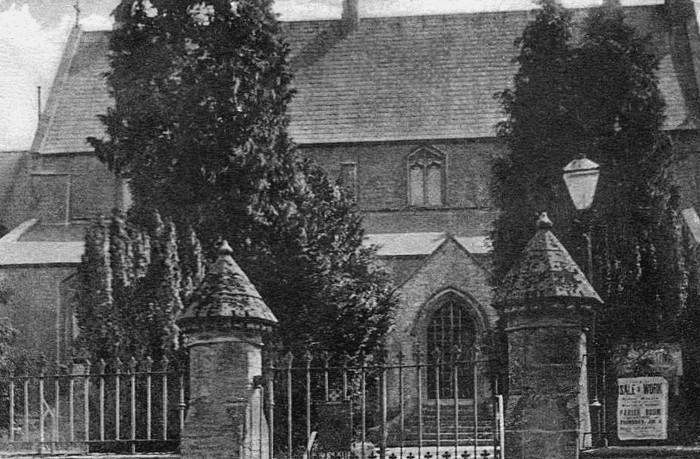

Religion
- Affiliation: Church of England
- Ecclesiastical or organizational status: Demolished
- Year consecrated: 1854

Location
- Location: Crewkerne, Somerset, England
- Interactive map of Christ Church
- Coordinates: 50.8823°N 2.7938°W

Architecture
- Architect: James Mountford Allen
- Type: Church
- Style: Perpendicular

Christ Church was a Church of England church in Crewkerne, Somerset, England. It was constructed in 1852–1854 to the designs of James Mountford Allen. Christ Church was demolished in 1975 and the site is now occupied by a residential development, Christchurch Court.

== History ==
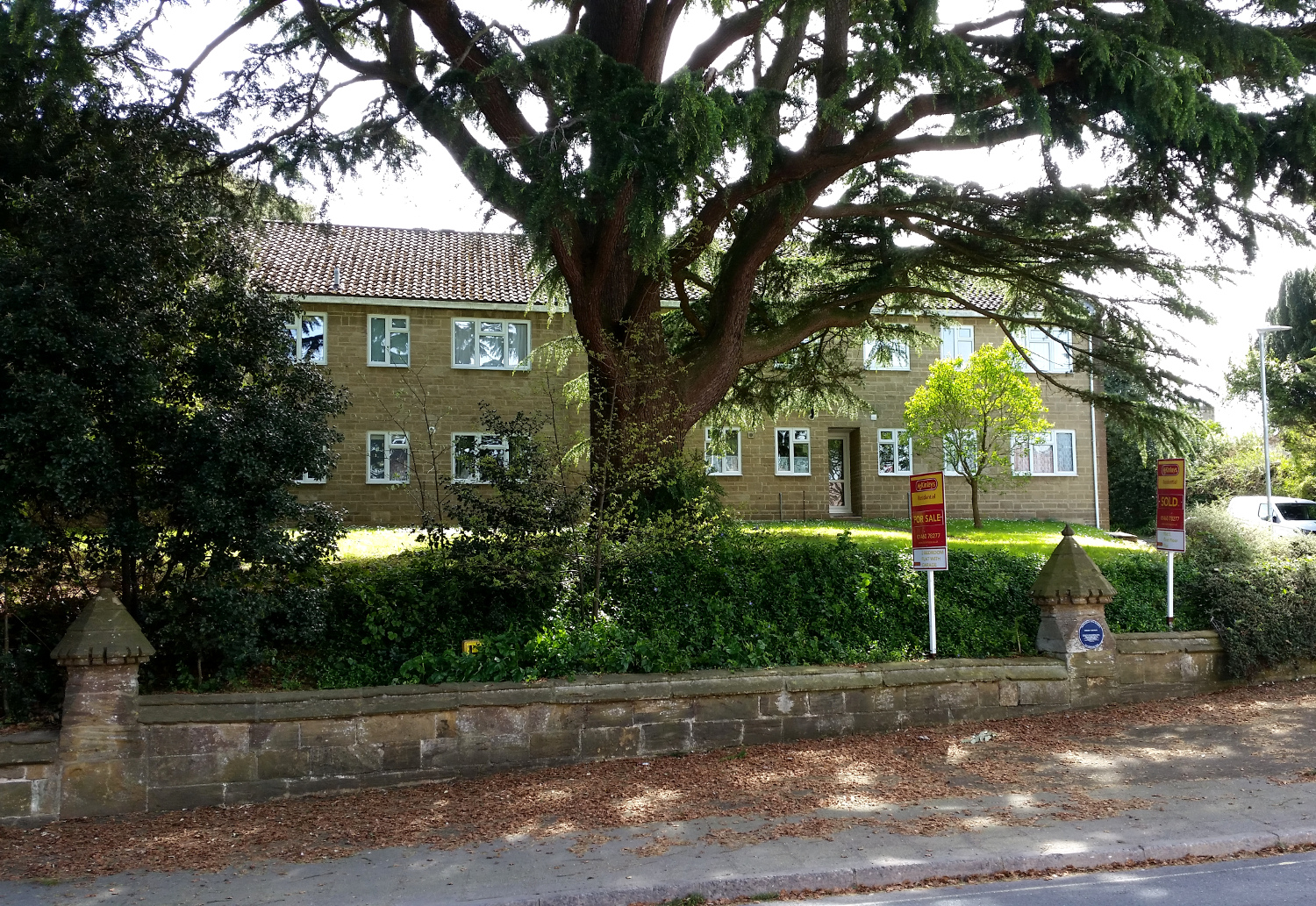
Christchurch Court

Christ Church was built as a chapel of ease to the parish church of St Bartholomew. Owing to Crewkerne's increasing population at the time, the existing accommodation provided by the parish church had become insufficient. By 1842, the town had a population of over 4,000, with the parish church containing 800 sittings, of which only 108 were available to the poor. A new district church was proposed in 1842, but the scheme failed to come to fruition. A vestry meeting held in 1846 resolved to erect galleries in the parish church, but the proposal was abandoned in favour of the construction of a chapel of ease. Some of the town's residents objected to the installation of galleries in the parish church on the grounds that they would "interfere with [the] beauty" of the interior.

A vestry meeting of 1851 saw the formation of a building committee for the chapel of ease scheme. By this time, a site at South Street had been acquired and a substantial donation of £1,000 received from Mr. William Hoskins of North Perrott. Mr. Hoskins expressed his desire to provide the poor of the parish with much-needed church accommodation and requested that two-thirds of the new church's seating be free and unappropriated. He was also against the proposal to erect galleries in the parish church in the fear it would "destroy [its] architectural beauty". The remaining sum required for the new church was raised by public subscription.

The plans for the new church were drawn up by the Crewkerne architect James Mountford Allen and Messrs John Chick of Beaminster hired as the builders. The foundation stone of the church was laid by Mr. Thomas Hoskins of Haselbury Plucknett on 31 August 1852, and the church was consecrated by the Bishop of Bath and Wells, the Right Rev. Robert Eden, on 20 September 1854. The total cost of the church, including endowments, amounted to £3,932.

The church underwent restoration and improvement work in 1878 and reopened in November that year. The vestry was enlarged in 1900 to the designs of Howard Gaye of London. A new organ, built by James Ivimey of Southampton, was dedicated at the church on 13 July 1910 by the Rural Dean, Rev. W. Farrer.

By the 1960s, Christ Church was facing dwindling congregation numbers as many parishioners favoured worshipping in St Bartholomew, except namely the elderly parishioners who had used Christ Church for years. In 1965, plans were revealed for the potential selling or leasing of the church to the Roman Catholic Church. At the time, the Catholic parish covering Chard, Crewkerne and Ilminster faced a shortage of accommodation in Crewkerne as their small wooden chapel, also on South Street, was too small to serve its congregation, particularly after recent expansion of the town. The plans did not come to fruition.

Christ Church was declared redundant by the Church of England on 7 August 1969. Although it was a listed building, the Church Commissioners sought the demolition of the church to make way for housing. In January 1975, Yeovil District Council approved the Church Commissioners' plans for its demolition and replacement with four houses. Demolition was carried out in 1975 and ultimately it was replaced with Christchurch Court, a residential development of eight flats and garages. The Bishop of Bath and Wells, the Right Rev. John Bickersteth, authorised the breaking up of the churchyard's remaining tombstones, approximately 14 of them and many illegible, for reuse as building foundation material, unless any relatives wished to remove them themselves. A request was also made to the Home Office for an order to abolish the requirement of moving human remains from the site, where they would be left undisturbed. A blue plaque is now fixed on the front boundary wall to commemorate the former church.

== Architecture ==
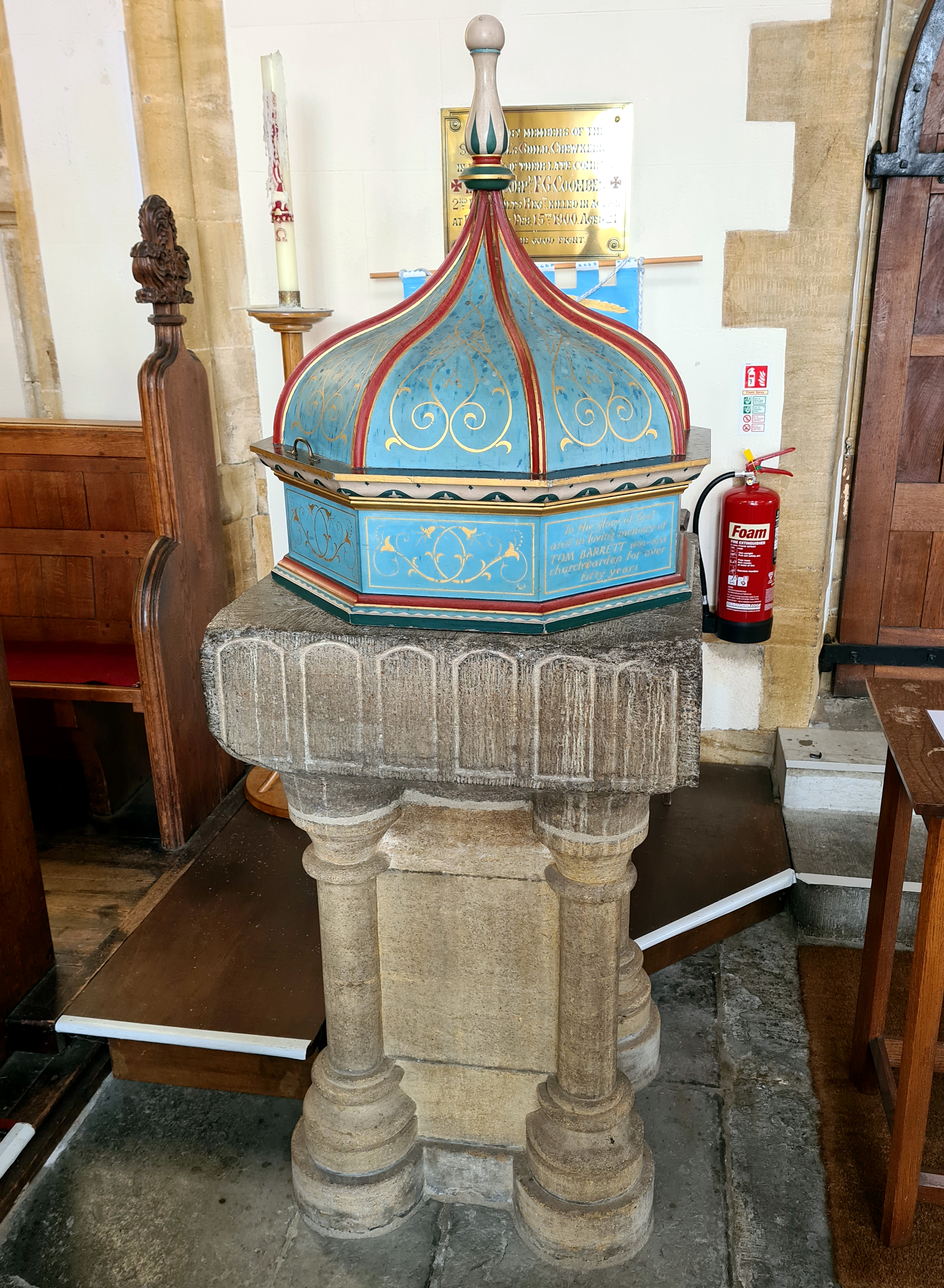
Christ Church's font cover, now in the parish church of St Bartholomew.

Christ Church was built of local stone quarried on the site, with dressings of Hamstone. It was made up of a four-bay nave with clerestory, north aisle, chancel, with a vestry on the north side and an organ chapel on the south side, and north porch. A bellcote was located at the west end of the roof. The arches, windows and other dressings were worked by Charles Trask of Norton-sub-Hamdon. The church's font of Caen stone also featured carved work by Mr. Trask. The church was designed with 410 sittings, 321 of which were free.
