= Netherhay Methodist Chapel =

Chapel in Dorset, England

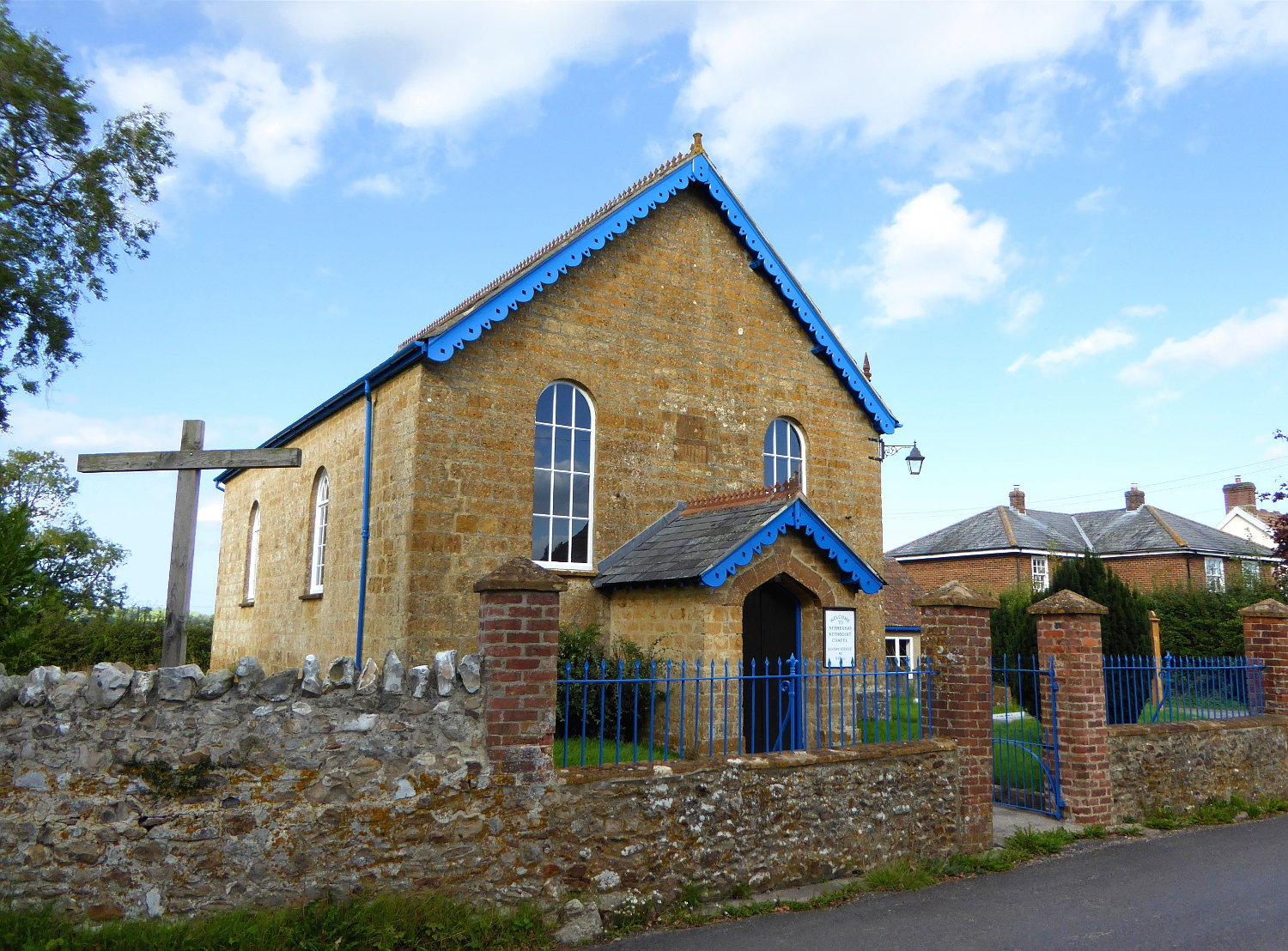

Religion
- Affiliation: Methodist
- Ecclesiastical or organizational status: Active

Location
- Location: Netherhay, Dorset, England
- Interactive map of Netherhay Methodist Chapel
- Coordinates: 50.8449°N 2.8336°W

Architecture
- Type: Chapel
- Completed: 1838

Netherhay Methodist Chapel is a Methodist Chapel in Netherhay, near Drimpton, Dorset, England. The chapel remains active as part of the South Petherton and Crewkerne Methodist Circuit. The chapel has been a Grade II listed building since 1984.

The chapel was built with "dressed stone walls on a chert rubble-stone base". It has a slate roof, which includes some carved wooden barge-boards, added in 1898. A burial ground was established alongside the chapel.

== History ==
Netherhay Methodist Chapel was built in 1838. The funds for its construction was raised by public subscription, while the plot of land had been donated by Henry Northover of Greenham. The chapel was opened on 2 October 1838 by Rev. Thomas Lessey. In 1887, a schoolroom was added to run Sunday school classes, and in 1898 the chapel was restored and a porch added. By the late 20th century, the chapel was under threat of closure due to the declining number of worshipers.

In the early 2000s, the remaining members of the chapel began looking at restoring and modernising the chapel, while ideas to broaden its use by the community were considered. After a period of fund-raising, the chapel underwent renovation and modernisation in 2007–08. The chapel remains active as part of the South Petherton and Crewkerne Methodist Circuit and also regularly holds exhibitions and workshops. An adjoining community room is used for small events and meetings, and two small studios are let to local artists.
