= Broadwindsor =

Village in Dorset, England

Coordinates: 50.8189°N 2.7989°W

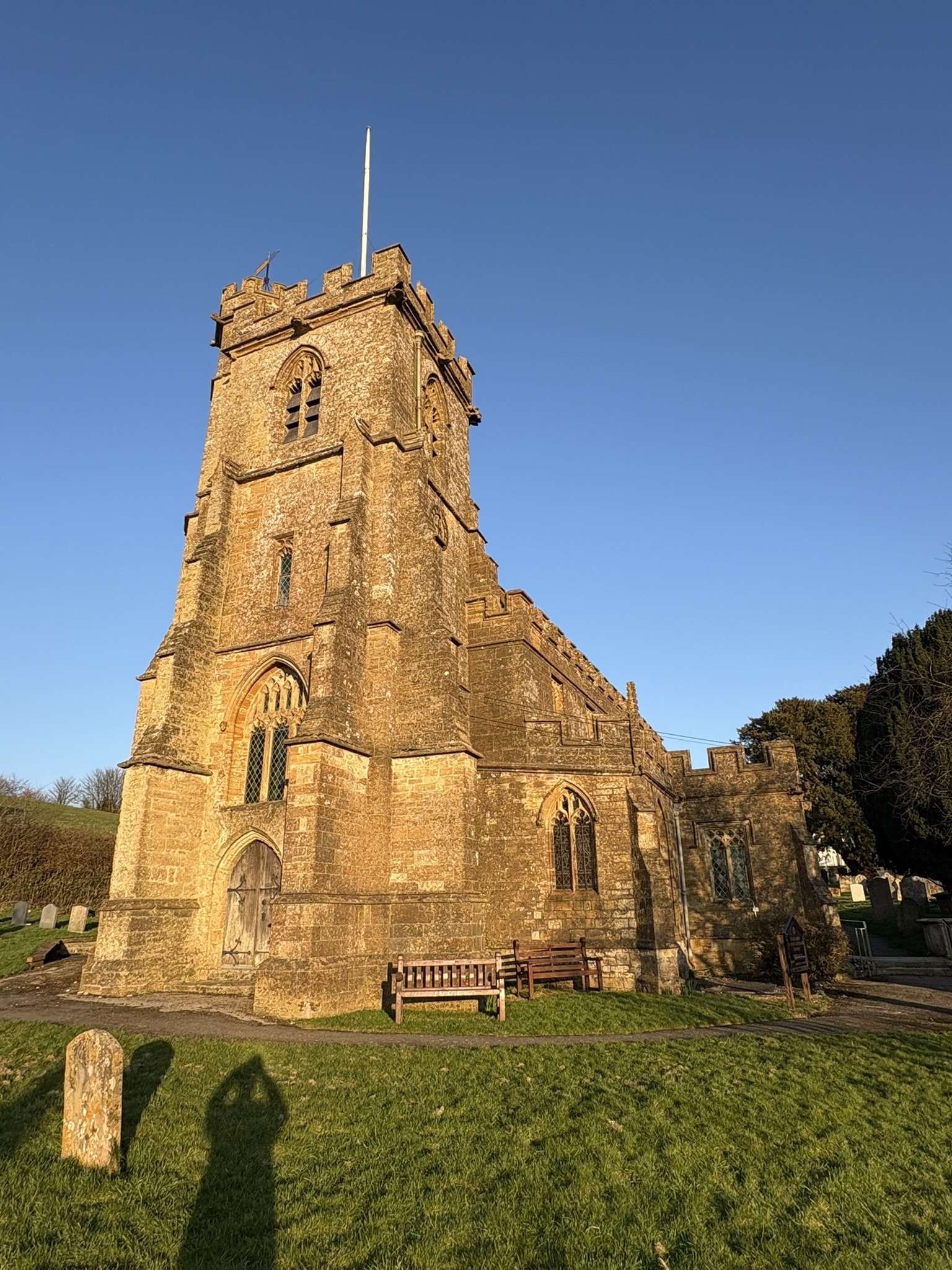
- Parish church of St John the Baptist, Broadwindsor

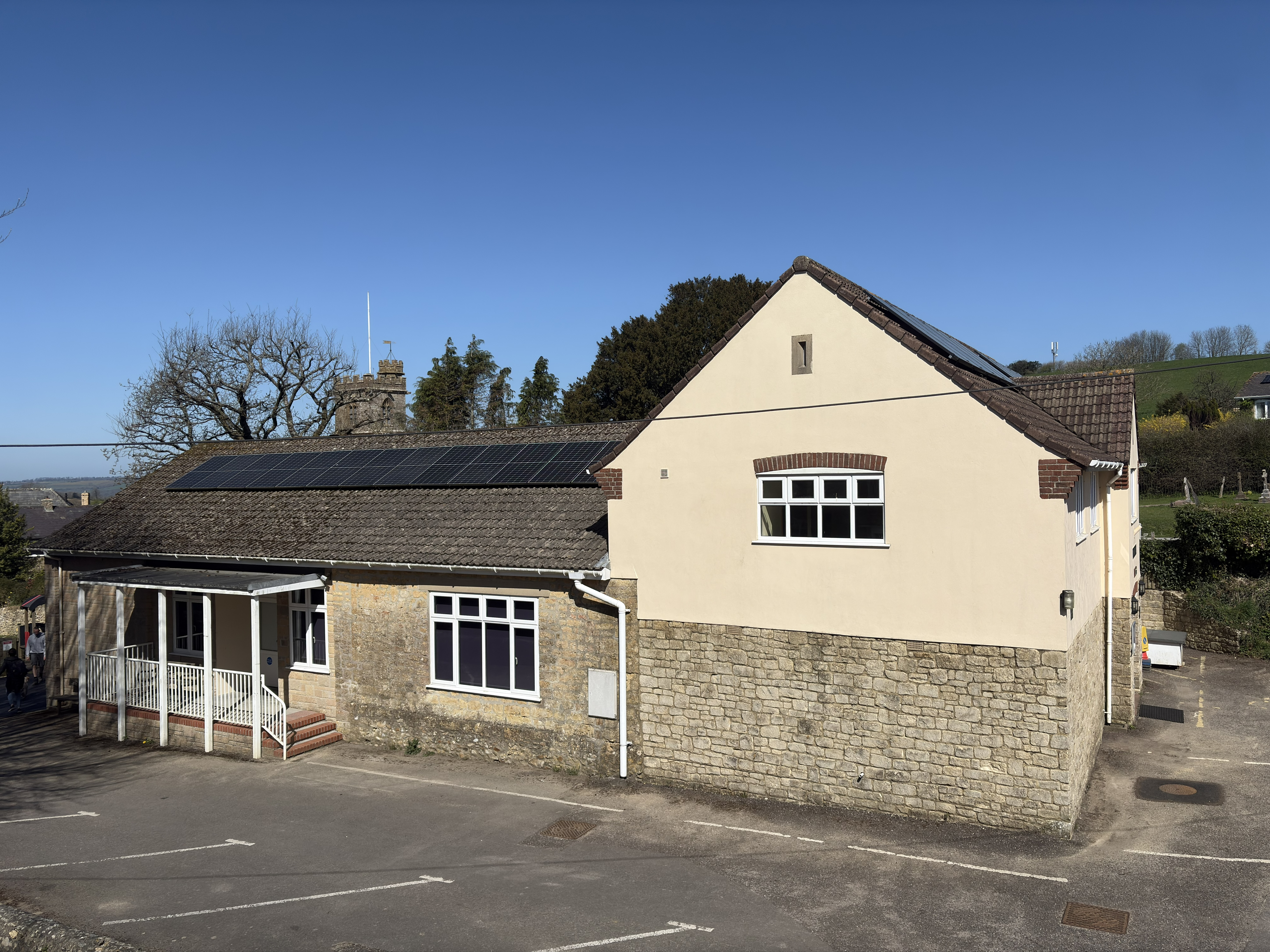
- Comrades Hall, Broadwindsor, in the centre of the village

- Location within Dorset
- Population: 1,320
- OS grid reference: ST437026
- Unitary authority: Dorset
- Ceremonial county: Dorset
- Region: South West
- Country: England
- Sovereign state: United Kingdom
- Post town: Beaminster
- Postcode district: DT8
- Police: Dorset
- Fire: Dorset and Wiltshire
- Ambulance: South Western
- UK Parliament: West Dorset
- Website: Broadwindsor Village

Broadwindsor ( /ˌbrɔːdˈwɪnzər/) is a village and civil parish in the county of Dorset in South West England. It lies two miles (three kilometres) west of Beaminster. Broadwindsor was formerly a liberty, containing only the parish itself. Dorset County Council estimate that in 2013 the population of the civil parish was 1,320. In the 2011 census the population of the parish, combined with that of the small parish of Seaborough to the north, was 1,378.

The parish church is principally Perpendicular in style, though it has origins in the 12th and 13th centuries, and was rebuilt in 1868. Thomas Fuller, who wrote The Worthies of England and The History of the Holy Warre, preached here between 1634 and 1650.

King Charles II stayed the night in the village on 23 September 1651, after his flight from the Battle of Worcester.

The settlement has a long history, with Paleolithic hand axes found to the west on Hursey Comman, a Bronze Age gold strip found just to the north of the village, a Roman fort, Waddon Hill, between Broadwindsor and Stoke Abbott, and a Roman hypocaust from the mid second century found between Broadwindsor and Little Windsor in about 1910.

The parish includes the village of Drimpton.

== Images ==
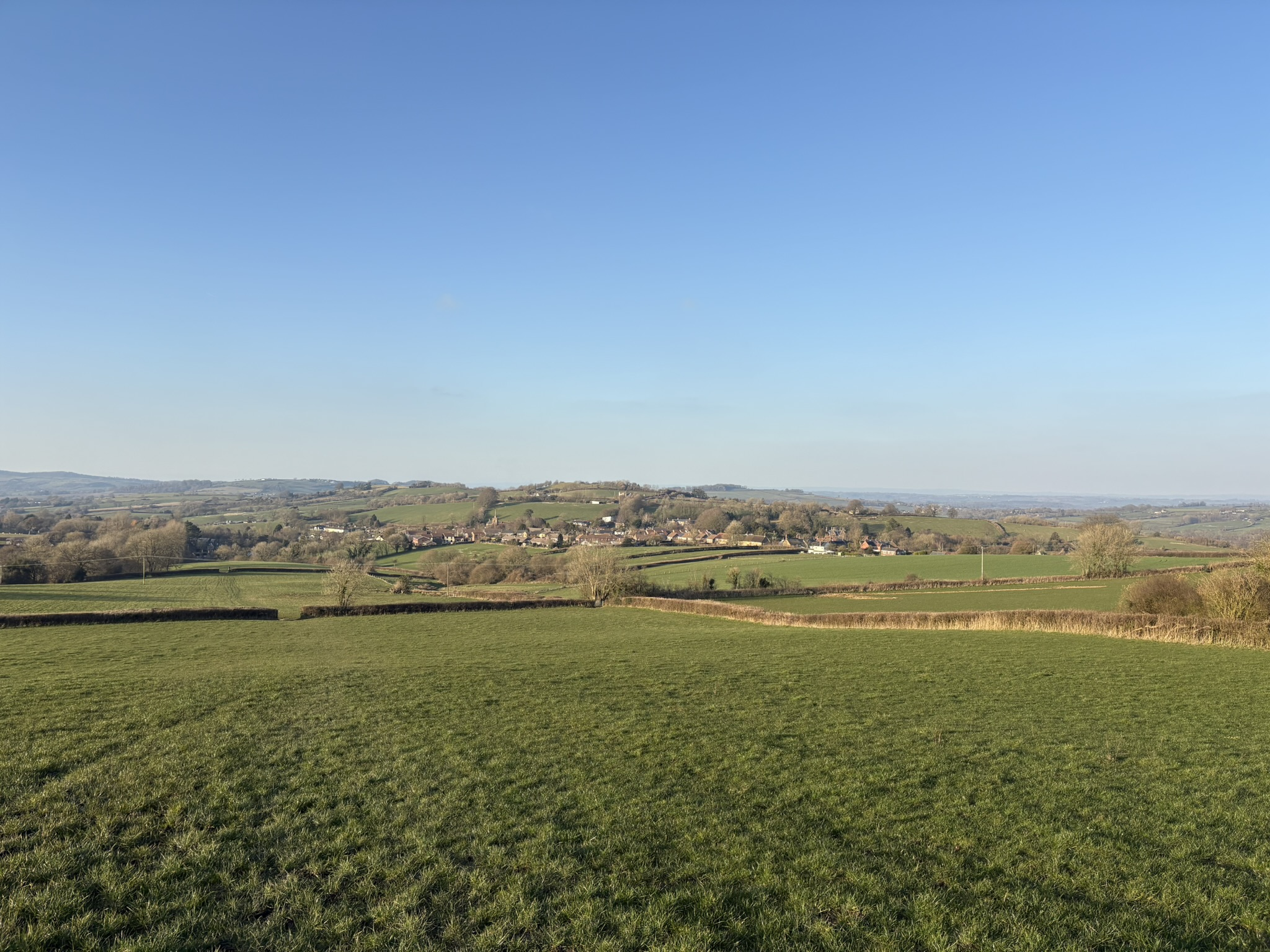
Broadwindsor from the slopes of Lewesdon Hill

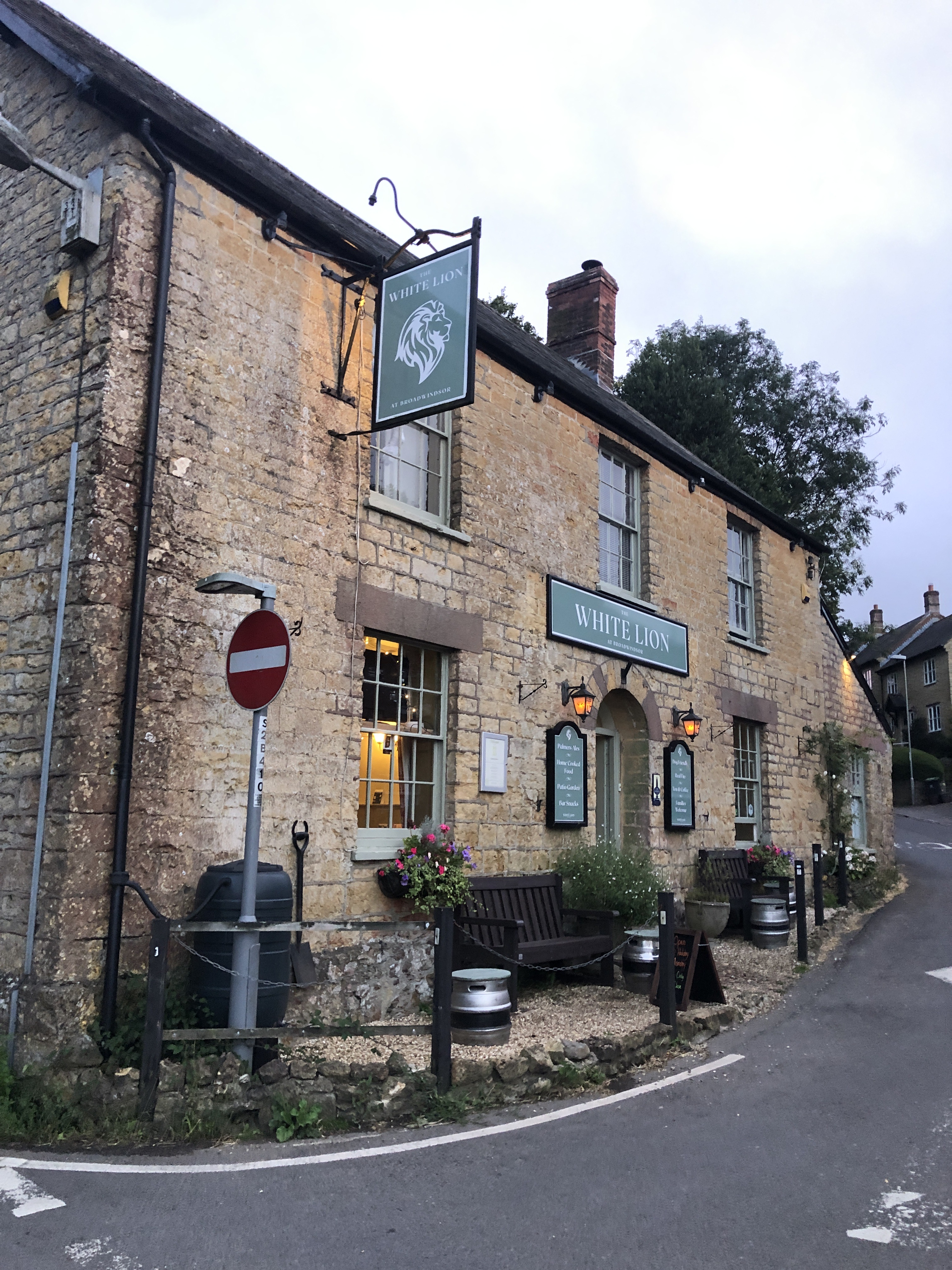
The White Lion pub, a main social centre in Broadwindsor

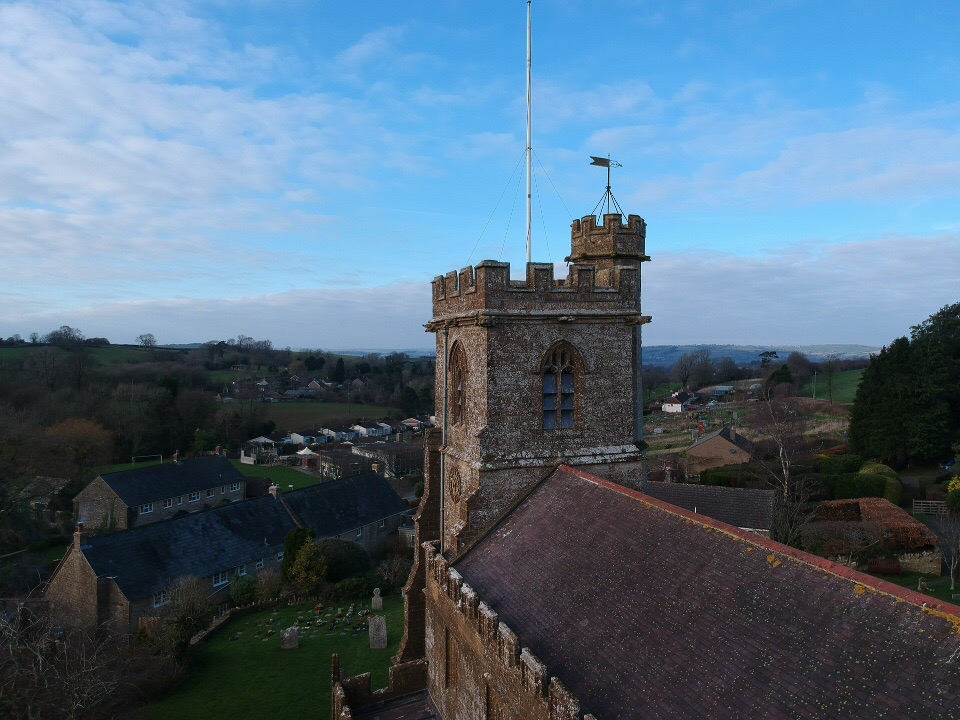
Aerial shot of St John the Baptist

== See also ==
List of liberties in Dorset
