= Clapton Mill =

Former watermill in Somerset, England

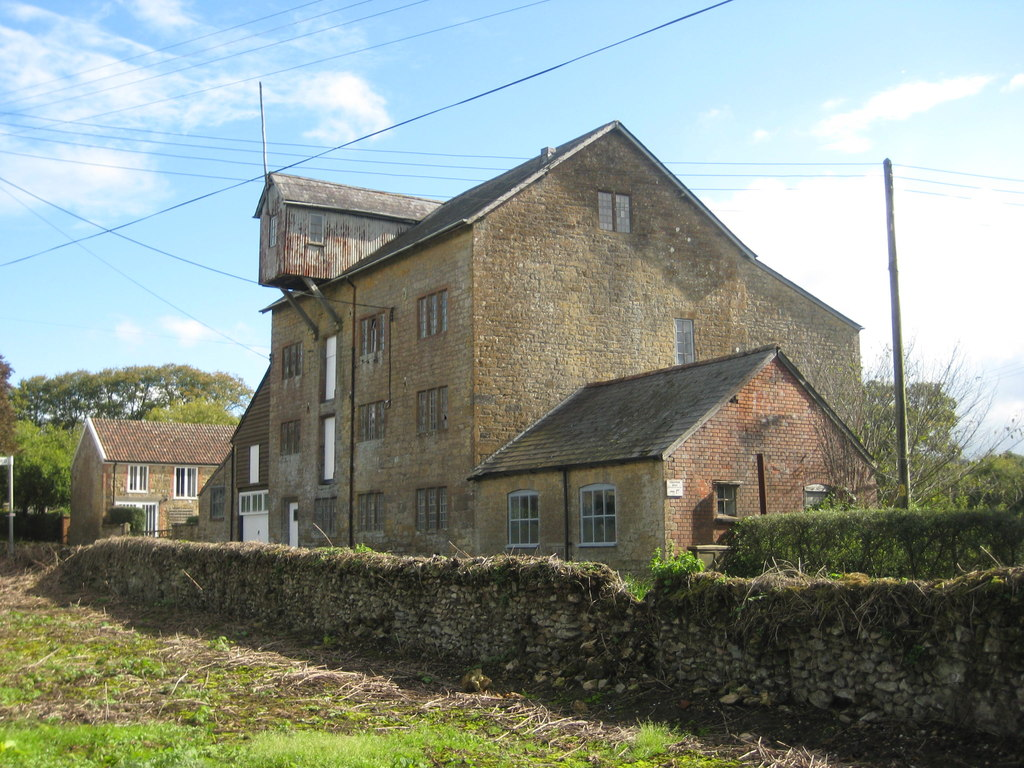

- Location within Somerset
- 50.8539°N 2.8342°W
- Location: Clapton, West Crewkerne, Somerset, England

History
- Built: 18th century

Listed Building – Grade II*
- Official name: Clapton Mill (Lockyer and Son), with aqueduct to north east
- Designated: 18 December 1987
- Reference no.: 1056856

Clapton Mill is a former watermill located in the hamlet of Clapton, West Crewkerne, Somerset, England. The existing mill dates back to the 18th century, but was extensively rebuilt in 1864. An earlier mill has existed on the same site since the 13th century. The mill, along with its aqueduct, has been Grade II* Listed since 1987, primarily for the surviving machinery which dates back to the 19th century rebuild.

== History ==
One of the earliest references to Clapton Mill is dated 1228, when Baldwin of Clapton, then Lord of the Manor, obtained the mill. During the 17th century, the mill was referred to as Langdon's Mill and Lower Mill. Following the 1864 rebuild, the Lockyer family became tenants of Clapton Mill in 1870 and later purchased it in 1901. It remained in operation under Lockyer and Son until 1991.

After its closure, the Lockyers sold the property in 1995. The new owners made plans to return the mill to commercial use, while also attracting visitors as a working museum. In 2006, a hydro-electric turbine was installed at the mill to generate green energy. Tours of the mill are operated on an appointment-only basis.
