= Wayford Manor House =

Country house in Somerset, England

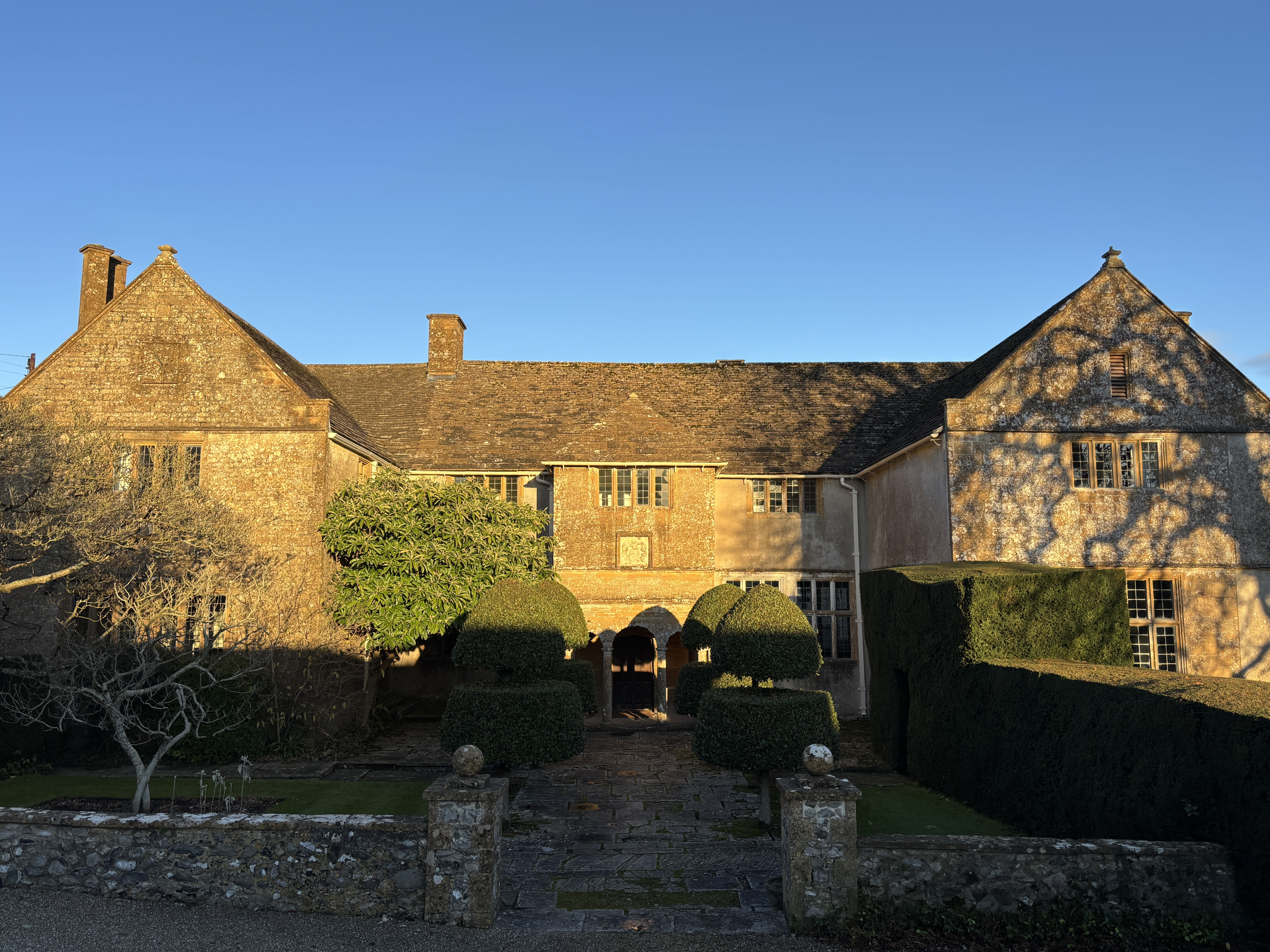

- Location within Somerset
- 50°51′19″N 2°50′45″W
- Location: Wayford, Somerset, England

History
- Built: c. 1600

Listed Building – Grade I
- Designated: 4 February 1958
- Reference no.: 1177681

Wayford Manor House is a country house with a garden in Britain, situated in Wayford, Somerset, England. It has been designated a Grade I listed building.

== House ==
The house includes a central range which was rebuilt about 1600 on the site of an earlier building by Charles Daubeney, probably with William Arnold as master mason.

The north wing was completed in 1900 by architect Sir Ernest George.

== Garden ==
Work on the gardens, including terraces and archways was carried out by Harold Peto around 1902. Peto was the brother of the wife of Lawrence Ingham Baker when he bought the house. The current Arts and Crafts garden is partly built on the site of an earlier Elizabethan garden. It includes a Japanese garden and a collection of mature trees, along with a rock garden, orchard and shrubs. The garden is listed Grade II on the Register of Historic Parks and Gardens of special historic interest in England.

Wayford Woods, close to the house, has an ornamental lake and is known for its large number of fairy doors.

== See also ==
- List of Grade I listed buildings in South Somerset
