= Wayford =

Village and civil parish in Somerset, England

Coordinates: 50.8549°N 2.8466°W

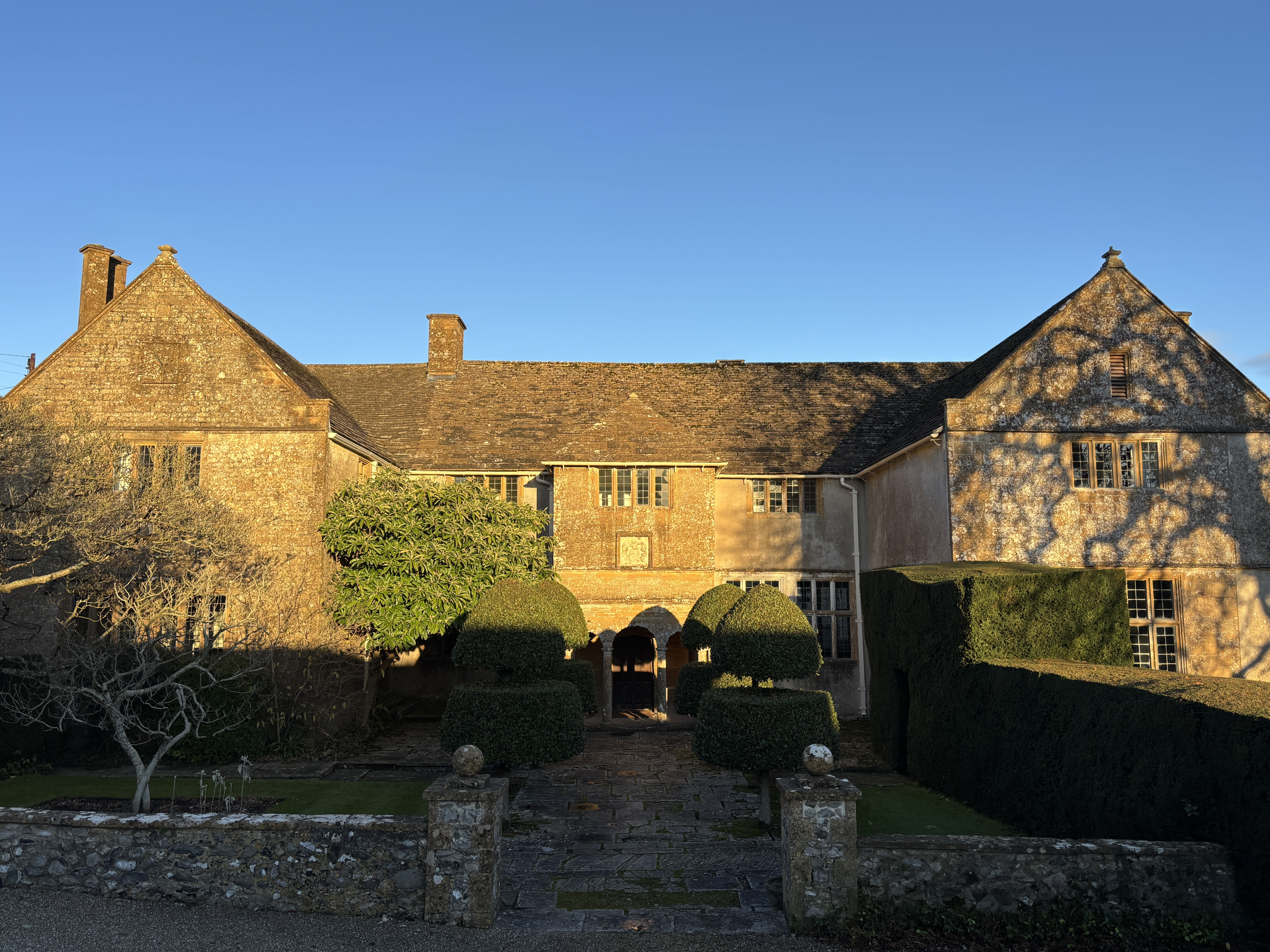
- Wayford Manor House

- Location within Somerset
- Population: 114 (2011)
- OS grid reference: ST405065
- Unitary authority: Somerset Council
- Ceremonial county: Somerset
- Region: South West
- Country: England
- Sovereign state: United Kingdom
- Post town: CREWKERNE
- Postcode district: TA18
- Dialling code: 01460
- Police: Avon and Somerset
- Fire: Devon and Somerset
- Ambulance: South Western
- UK Parliament: Yeovil

Wayford is a village and civil parish on the River Axe, 3 miles (5 km) south-west of Crewkerne, in Somerset, England.

== History ==
The parish was part of the hundred of Crewkerne.

Wayford Manor House was rebuilt around 1600 by Charles Daubeney, probably with William Arnold as master mason. The north wing was completed by Sir Ernest George in 1900. Wayford Woods, close to the house, has an ornamental lake and is known for the large number of fairy doors it used to have.

== Governance ==
The parish council has responsibility for local issues, including setting an annual precept (local rate) to cover the council's operating costs.

For local government purposes, since 1 April 2023, the parish comes under the unitary authority of Somerset Council. Prior to this, it was part of the non-metropolitan district of South Somerset (established under the Local Government Act 1972). It was part of Chard Rural District before 1974.

It is also part of the county constituency represented in the House of Commons of the Parliament of the United Kingdom. It elects one Member of Parliament (MP) by the first past the post system of election.

== Religious sites ==
The Church of St Michael dates from the 13th century and has been designated by English Heritage as a Grade II* listed building.
