= Seaborough =

Village in Dorset, England

Coordinates: 50.850°N 2.813°W

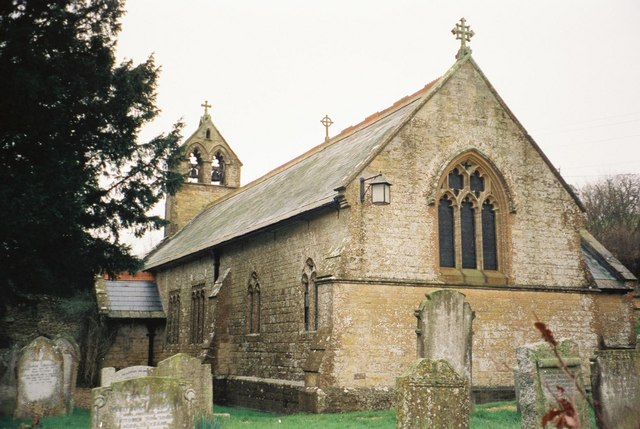
- Parish church of St John

- Location within Dorset
- Population: 60
- OS grid reference: ST429060
- Unitary authority: Dorset
- Ceremonial county: Dorset
- Region: South West
- Country: England
- Sovereign state: United Kingdom
- Police: Dorset
- Fire: Dorset and Wiltshire
- Ambulance: South Western
- UK Parliament: West Dorset

Seaborough is a small village and civil parish in the county of Dorset in southwest England. It is sited in the valley of the River Axe and lies approximately 2 miles (3.2 km) south of Crewkerne in Somerset. The parish was historically in Somerset, part of the hundred of Crewkerne, but was transferred to Dorset in 1896. In 2013 the estimated population of the civil parish was 60.

The village church is small and mostly not of ancient construction. Ralph Wightman, broadcaster, agriculturist and a native of Dorset, described it as "delightful", and claimed that the round arch of the porch was so low it "would remove the hat of any man of average height."

Seaborough lies on the northern side of the Axe valley, beneath the 204-metre-high (669 ft) Seaborough Hill. The minor lane which passes through the village and up the hill is noted for being particularly steep. At the bottom of the village the river is crossed by a small stone bridge, close to which is an old ducking pool, into which scolding wives would historically have been dipped in an attempt to 'cure' them of their condition.

In March 2013 a fire at the 100-metre-long (330 ft) piggery at Seaborough Manor destroyed the building and killed about nine hundred pigs. Fifty firefighters took about three hours to tackle the blaze.
