= Crewkerne =

Town in Somerset, England

Coordinates: 50.882°N 2.790°W

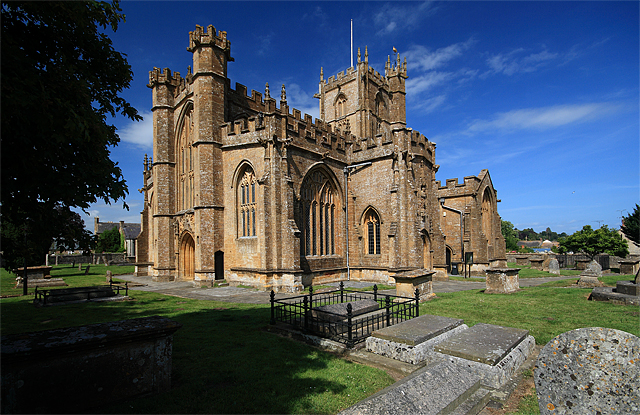
- St Bartholomew's Church, Crewkerne

- Location within Somerset
- Population: 7,333 (Parish, 2021); 7,065 (Built up area, 2021)
- OS grid reference: ST445095
- Civil parish: Crewkerne
- Unitary authority: Somerset
- Ceremonial county: Somerset
- Region: South West
- Country: England
- Sovereign state: United Kingdom
- Post town: CREWKERNE
- Postcode district: TA18
- Dialling code: 01460
- Police: Avon and Somerset
- Fire: Devon and Somerset
- Ambulance: South Western
- UK Parliament: Yeovil
- Website: www.crewkerne-tc.gov.uk

Crewkerne (/ˈkruːkərn/ KROO-kərn) is a town and civil parish in Somerset, England. It lies 9 miles (14 km) south-west of Yeovil and 7 miles (11 km) east of Chard. It is close to the county boundary with Dorset to the south. The town is on the main headwater of the River Parrett, the A30 road and the West of England railway line. At the 2021 census, the parish had a population of 7,333 and the built-up area had a population of 7,065.

The earliest written record of Crewkerne is in the 899 will of Alfred the Great who left it to his youngest son Æthelweard. After the Norman Conquest it was held by William the Conqueror and in the Domesday Survey of 1086 was described as a royal manor. Crewkerne Castle was possibly a Norman motte castle. The town grew up in the late mediaeval period around the textile industry, its wealth demonstrated in the 15th-century Church of St Bartholomew. During the 18th and 19th centuries the main industry was cloth making, including webbing, and sails for the Royal Navy.

Local ecological sites include the Bincombe Beeches local nature reserve and the Millwater biological Site of Special Scientific Interest. Crewkerne railway station is served by South Western Railway. The town is the birthplace of several notable people and has varied cultural and sporting facilities including those at Wadham School.

== History ==
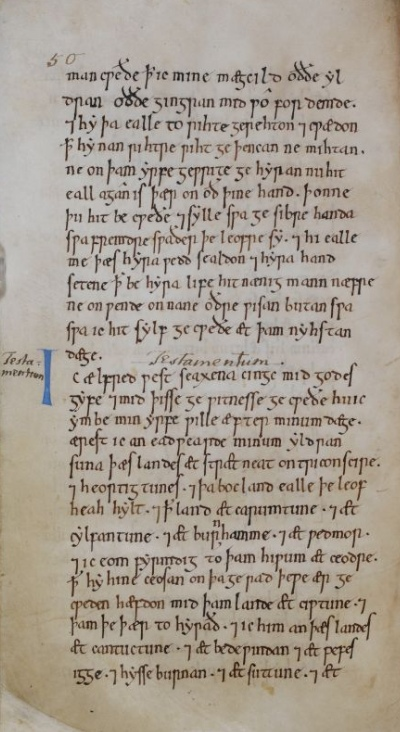
Will of Alfred the Great, AD 873–888, mentions land at Crucern (11th-century copy, British Library Stowe MS 944, ff. 29v–33r)

The name Crewkerne is thought to be derived from Cruc-aera; from the British cruc – a spur of a hill, and the Old English aera – a house, especially a storehouse. The town was known as Crocern, or Cruaern in the 899 will of Alfred the Great when he left it to his younger son Æthelweard, and by 1066 the manor was held by Edith Swanneck, mistress of King Harold. After the Norman Conquest the Domesday Survey of 1086 shows the so-named manor was feudally royal, a possession of William the Conqueror, and the church estate was given to the Abbaye-aux-Hommes in Caen, Normandy.

In 1499, John de Combe, a precentor of Exeter Cathedral and former vicar of Crewkerne, founded Crewkerne Grammar School. The school survived until 1904.

Crewkerne Castle was possibly a Norman motte castle on a mound to the north-west of the town, which is known as Castle Hill. The town grew up in the late mediaeval period around the textile industry, its wealth preserved in its fifteenth century parish church. It later prospered as a coaching stop in the Georgian period.

The Manor Farmhouse in Henley was built from hamstone in the early 17th century, but possibly incorporates medieval fragments. The building is designated by English Heritage as a Grade II* listed building. During the 18th and 19th centuries the main industry was cloth making, including webbing, and sails for the Royal Navy.

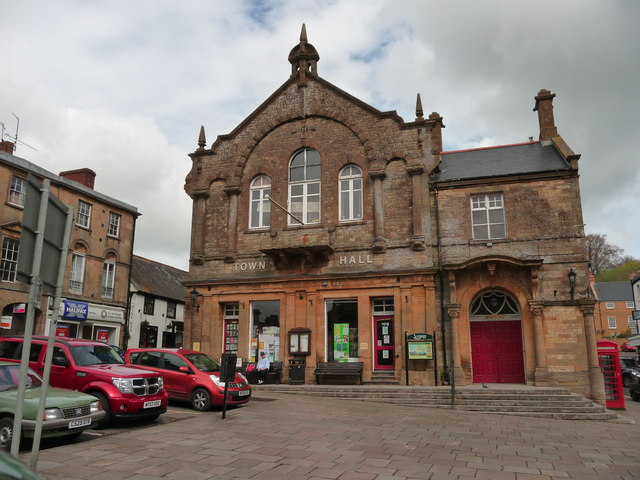
Crewkerne Town Hall

Crewkerne Town Hall occupies part of the Victoria Hall in the Market Square. The hamstone building was rebuilt around 1742 and altered in 1836, when a south piazza was added after the demolition of the shambles. In 1848–9 it became a museum, reading room and library and was remodelled in 1900 by Thomas Benson of Yeovil to create shops and offices. It is a Grade II listed building.

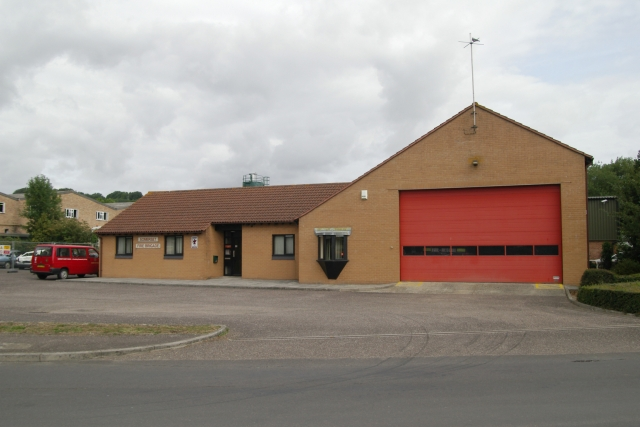
Crewkerne Fire Station

== Governance ==
There are two tiers of local government covering Crewkerne, at parish (town) and unitary authority level: Crewkerne Town Council and Somerset Council. The town council is based at the Town Hall.

For national elections, the town forms part of the Yeovil constituency.

=== Administrative history ===
Crewkerne was an ancient parish which also gave its name to the wider Crewkerne Hundred of Somerset. As well as the town itself, the parish historically also covered surrounding rural areas, particularly to the west of the town, including several hamlets.

When elected parish and district councils were established under the Local Government Act 1894, it was decided that Crewkerne should be governed as an urban district, but that the whole parish was not suitable for being an urban district. The more rural parts of the parish were therefore made a separate civil parish called West Crewkerne. Although a separate civil parish since 1894, West Crewkerne remains part of the Church of England ecclesiastical parish of Crewkerne.

Crewkerne Urban District was abolished in 1974 under the Local Government Act 1972, with its area becoming part of the new district of Yeovil. The Yeovil district was renamed South Somerset in 1985. A successor parish was created covering the former urban district as part of the 1974 reforms, with its parish council taking the name Crewkerne Town Council.

South Somerset was abolished in 2023. Somerset County Council then took over district-level functions across its area, making it a unitary authority, and was renamed Somerset Council.

== Geography ==
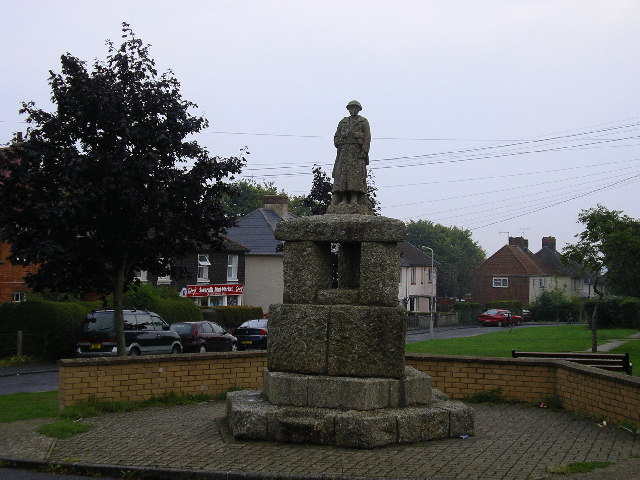
War memorial in Severalls Park

The town lies west of the River Parrett. The main residential areas are around the town centre with Kithill and Park View to the South and Wadham Park to the North.

In the northern outskirts of the town is the Bincombe Beeches, a 5-hectare (12-acre) local nature reserve which is managed by the town council and includes a line of beech trees, some of which are between 150 and 200 years old. Between 2002 and 2005 grants were obtained to improve access to the site and support the planting of new trees. The Millwater biological Site of Special Scientific Interest consists of a complex mosaic of pasture, wet grassland, tall-herb fen, standing and running water, alder and willow carr.

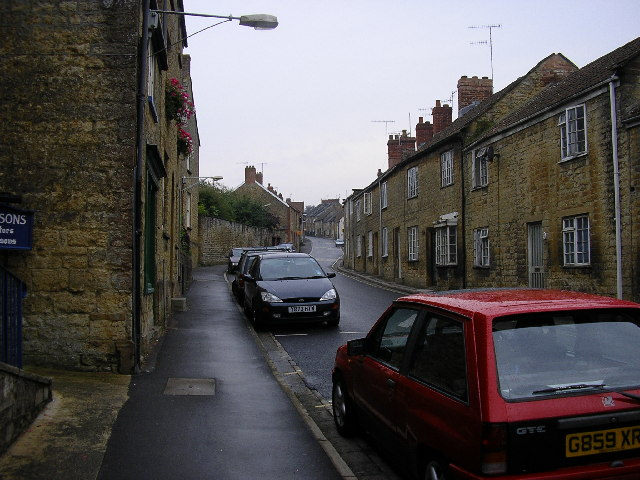
Hermitage Street

=== Climate ===
Along with the rest of South West England, Crewkerne has a temperate climate which is generally wetter and milder than the rest of the country. The annual mean temperature is approximately 10 °C (50.0 °F). Seasonal temperature variation is less extreme than most of the nation due to nearby shore/land breezes to/from seas. The summer months of July and August are the warmest with mean daily maxima of approximately 21 °C (69.8 °F). In winter mean minimum daily readings of 1 °C (33.8 °F) or 2 °C (35.6 °F) are common. In the summer the Azores high pressure normally extends to the Region, yet convective cloud will on some days form inland, cutting sunshine. Annual sunshine rates are slightly less than the regional average of 1,600 hours. Most of the rainfall in the south-west is caused by Atlantic depressions or by convection. Most of the rainfall in autumn and winter is caused by the Atlantic depressions, which is when they are most active. In summer, a large proportion of the rainfall is caused by sun heating the ground leading to convection and to showers and thunderstorms. Average rainfall is around 700 mm (28 in). About 8–15 days of snowfall is typical. November to March have the highest mean wind speeds, and June to August have the lightest winds. The predominant wind direction is from the south-west.

== Demographics ==
Census population of Crewkerne parish
Census	Population	Female	Male	Households	Source
2001	6,728	3,513	3,215	2,971	
2011	7,000	3,646	3,354	3,233	
2021	7,333	3,825	3,508	3,420	

== Economy ==
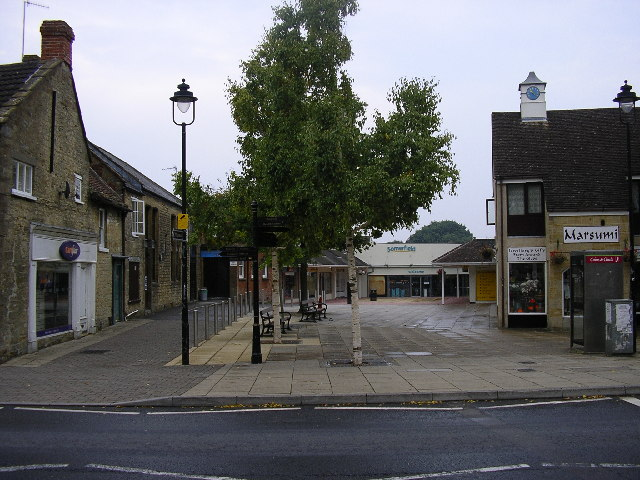
Falkland Square

Crewkerne is a small market town centre with many cafes, shops and supermarkets. Crewkerne also has a wide selection of public houses. The largest supermarket is the Waitrose store which is around 21,000 sq ft (2,000 m^{2}) and opened in November 2008. All of the large supermarkets are situated around the South Street multi-storey car park.

Ariel Motor Company is based in Crewkerne, and is one of the UK's smallest automobile companies, with just seven employees, producing fewer than 100 cars per year. It was founded in 1991 and changed its name from Solocrest Ltd in 2001. The company's flagship car is the Ariel Atom, an extremely light, high performance car.

== Culture ==
The Henhayes Centre provides conference facilities and has also featured exhibitions.

Crewkerne and District Museum is part of a wider heritage centre which includes local archives and a meeting room. The museum opened in 2000 in an old house with an 18th-century frontage. It was restored with the help of grants from the Heritage Lottery Fund, Somerset County Council, South Somerset District Council and Crewkerne Town Council. The development of Crewkerne during the 18th and 19th centuries, with particular emphasis on the flax and linen industry is illustrated with a permanent display. Other collections relate to local archaeology, Coins and Medals, Costume and Textiles, Fine Art, Music, Personalities, Science and Technology, Social History, Weapons and War.

== Transport ==
The following roads pass through Crewkerne:

- Northbound: A356 North Street – To A303 for London and North Somerset.
- Southbound: A356 South Street – To Maiden Newton and Dorchester.
- Westbound: A30 West Street – To Exeter and the South West of England.
- Eastbound :A30 East Street – To Yeovil and Salisbury.
- Southbound: B3165 Hermitage Street – To Lyme Regis.
- The closest motorway is the M5 at junction 25 for Taunton.

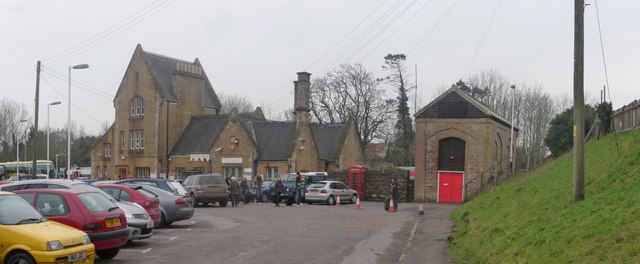
Railway station

Crewkerne railway station, in nearby Misterton, is served by South Western Railway on what was the main south western railway line before it was outranked by the Taunton line. Trains operate to London Waterloo (two and a half hours away) via Salisbury (70 minutes), and in the opposite direction to Exeter St Davids (under an hour). There is also a service provided by Great Western Railway to London Paddington. The station was opened by the London and South Western Railway on 19 July 1860. It was designed by Sir William Tite and has been designated as a Grade II listed building.

The town is served by Stagecoach South West with buses to Yeovil via Kithill, Misterton and Haselbury Plucknett and Chard. Buses also run to Merriott, South Petherton and Ilminster and Taunton. First West of England has service to Bridport via Beaminster and Broadwindsor, Yeovil via East Chinnock and West Coker and Chard.

It is on the route of the Monarch's Way a 615-mile (990 km) long-distance footpath in England that approximates the escape route taken by King Charles II in 1651 after being defeated in the Battle of Worcester.

== Education ==
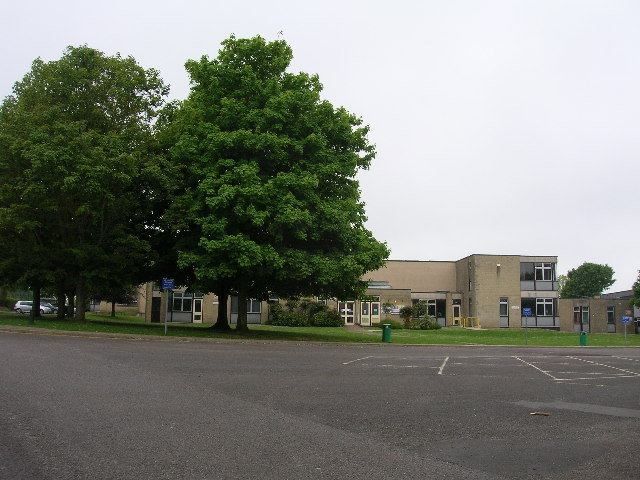
Wadham School

The primary schools in Crewkerne are St. Bartholomew's on Kithill, Ashlands on North Street and Maiden Beech Primary Academy on Lyme Road.

Crewkerne Grammar School was at DeCombe House, until it closed in the late 1960s to combine into St Martin's School long on Abbey Street (having moved from the High Street in the late 1970s). Its Senior and Juniors School closed in 2003, leaving a pre-school nursery. Its gym was on Gouldsbrook Terrace, converted since.

Wadham School has students from 11 to 18 years old and includes those travelling from surrounding villages.

== Religious sites ==
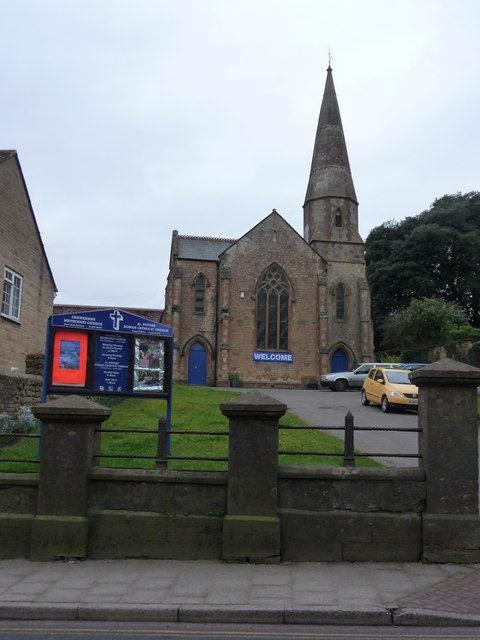
St Peter's Church, shared by Methodists and Roman Catholics

The Church of England parish church, St Bartholomew's, stands on high ground to the west of the town. The first Saxon church was founded before the end of the 9th century as a "minster", or main church of a Saxon royal estate that included an area which later became the parishes of Seaborough, Wayford and Misterton. This church was replaced after the Norman Conquest with a larger stone cruciform building, with a central tower. This was almost completely rebuilt and enlarged in the late 15th and early 16th centuries to create, for the most part, the church building visible today. It is an excellent example of the Perpendicular style with many unusual and individual features. These include the west front, the nave, the six-light aisle windows and the Tudor-style chapels and windows in the north east corner. The building material is golden-coloured Ham Hill stone, quarried nearby. There is a notable pair of 'green man' carvings within the church.

No major alterations have been made since the Reformation in the 1530s and 1540s, but there have been many changes to the interior to accommodate various phases of Church of England worship. Among these are an oven used for baking communion bread in the south east corner of the north chapel. During the Civil War, considerable damage was done including the destruction of nearly all of the medieval stained glass. William III of England worshipped in the church following his landing in the Glorious Revolution of 1689. By the early 19th century, all the medieval furnishings except the Norman font had disappeared. New pews were made and the west galleries were added in 1808–11. The latest restoration that has left the church interior visible today, took place in the late 19th century; it was more sympathetic to the church's architectural character than many Victorian restorations. At this time, the central section of the west gallery was removed to reveal the great west window and the organ was relocated to the south transept. The pews date from around 1900 and have attractive carved bench-ends. The church has been designated by English Heritage as a Grade I listed building.

Crewkerne also contains one of very few Unitarian chapels left in the West Country, Crewkerne Unitarian Church, a tiny chapel tucked away on Hermitage Street. The Methodist church on South Street is shared by Roman Catholic and Methodist congregations, following the closure and proposed redevelopment of St Peter's Catholic Church. Christ Church, a chapel of ease to St Bartholomew's, was built on South Street in 1852–54. It was declared redundant in 1969 and demolished in 1975. It is now the site of the residential Christchurch Court.

== Media ==
Local news and television programmes are provided by BBC West and ITV West Country. Television signals are received from the Mendip transmitter and the local relay transmitters.

Crewkerne's local radio stations are BBC Radio Somerset on 95.5 FM, Heart West on 97.1 FM, Greatest Hits Radio South West on 105.6 FM, and Radio Ninesprings, a community based station that broadcast on 104.5 FM.

The Chard and Ilminster News is the local newspaper that serves the town.

== Sport ==
The Crewkerne Aqua Centre provides swimming pool and fitness gym facilities to the town, on the grounds next to Henhayes Park, which used to be the Grammar school's playing fields. St. Martins School retained the use of the playing fields until the junior section was closed in 2003, as regular sports days were a tradition dating back to the grammar school era in the town. A further sports centre is on the Wadham School campus. Crewkerne Cricket Club play in the Somerset Cricket League whilst Crewkerne Rangers F.C. play in the Perry Street and District League, and Crewkerne ladies football club play in the Somerset Women's County league. There are also two lawn bowls clubs in the town.

== Notable residents ==
Thomas Coryat, a traveller and writer of the late Elizabethan and early Jacobean age was born in Crewkerne around 1577. Mathematician John Caswell was also born here. A later traveller, Colonel Joshua Fry, was born in the town in 1699 before becoming a surveyor, adventurer, mapmaker, soldier, and member of the House of Burgesses, the legislature of the colony of Virginia. Another Englishman from Crewkerne who emigrated to the American Colonies was William Phelps who was born around 1599 and became one of the founders of both Dorchester, Massachusetts and Windsor, Connecticut, foreman of the first grand jury in New England, served most of his life in early colonial government, and played a key role in establishing the first democratic town government in the American colonies. Ralph Reader, an actor, theatrical producer and songwriter, best known for staging the original Gang Show, a variety show for members of the scouting movement, was born in Crewkerne in 1903. The cricketer Michael Barnwell was born in the town in 1943.

list

- Thomas Coryat (c.1577–1617), an English traveller and writer of the late Elizabethan and early Jacobean age.
- William Phelps (c.1593—1672), a Puritan and co-founder of both Dorchester, Boston and Windsor, Connecticut.
- John Caswell (1654/1655–1712), mathematician and astronomer.
- Colonel Joshua Fry (1699–1754), an American adventurer, professor, real estate investor and local official in Colony of Virginia.
- Nathaniel Forster (1726?–1790), cleric and writer on political economy.
- Sir Leonard Pearce (1873–1947), electrical engineer, designed Battersea Power Station.
- Ralph Reader (1903–1982), actor, theatrical producer and songwriter, staged the original Gang Show.
- Michael Barnwell (born 1943), former first-class cricketer who played 19 games

== Twin towns ==
Crewkerne is twinned with Igny, Essonne and Bures-sur-Yvette in France.
