= Peter Mandelson =

British politician and diplomat (born 1953)

The Right Honourable The Lord Mandelson
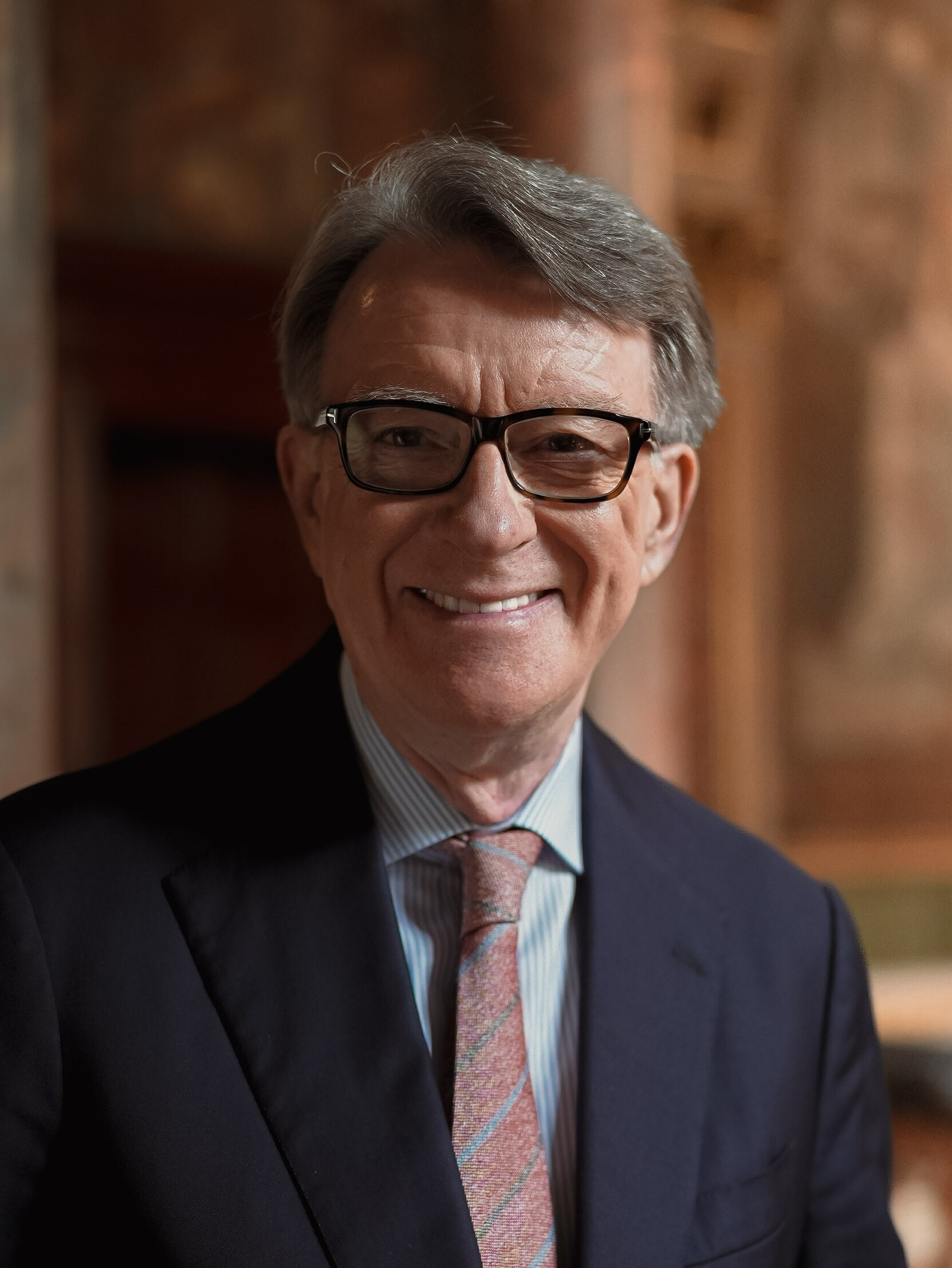
- Official portrait, 2025

British Ambassador to the United States
- In office 10 February 2025 – 11 September 2025
- Monarch: Charles III
- Prime Minister: Keir Starmer
- Preceded by: Karen Pierce
- Succeeded by: Christian Turner

First Secretary of State
- In office 5 June 2009 – 11 May 2010
- Prime Minister: Gordon Brown
- Preceded by: John Prescott (Note: Office vacant from 27 June 2007 to 5 June 2009)
- Succeeded by: William Hague
Other ministerial positions
Lord President of the Council
In office 5 June 2009 – 11 May 2010
Prime Minister	Gordon Brown
Preceded by	Baroness Royall of Blaisdon
Succeeded by	Nick Clegg
Secretary of State for Business, Innovation and Skills (Note: Secretary of State for Business, Enterprise and Regulatory Reform between 2008 and 2009; Secretary of State for Trade and Industry in 1998) President of the Board of Trade
In office 3 October 2008 – 11 May 2010
Prime Minister	Gordon Brown
Preceded by	John Hutton
Succeeded by	Vince Cable
In office 27 July 1998 – 23 December 1998
Prime Minister	Tony Blair
Preceded by	Margaret Beckett
Succeeded by	Stephen Byers
European Commissioner for Trade
In office 22 November 2004 – 3 October 2008
President	José Manuel Barroso
Preceded by	Pascal Lamy
Succeeded by	Catherine Ashton
Secretary of State for Northern Ireland
In office 11 October 1999 – 24 January 2001
Prime Minister	Tony Blair
Preceded by	Mo Mowlam
Succeeded by	John Reid
Minister without Portfolio
In office 2 May 1997 – 27 July 1998
Prime Minister	Tony Blair
Preceded by	Brian Mawhinney
Succeeded by	Charles Clarke

Member of the House of Lords
- Lord Temporal
- Life peerage 13 October 2008 – 4 February 2026

Member of Parliament for Hartlepool
- In office 9 April 1992 – 8 September 2004
- Preceded by: Ted Leadbitter
- Succeeded by: Iain Wright

Personal details
- Born: Peter Benjamin Mandelson; 21 October 1953 (age 73) Hendon, Middlesex, England
- Party: Labour (until 2026)
- Spouse: Reinaldo Avila da Silva (m. 2023)
- Relatives: Lord Morrison of Lambeth (grandfather)
- Education: St Catherine's College, Oxford (BA)
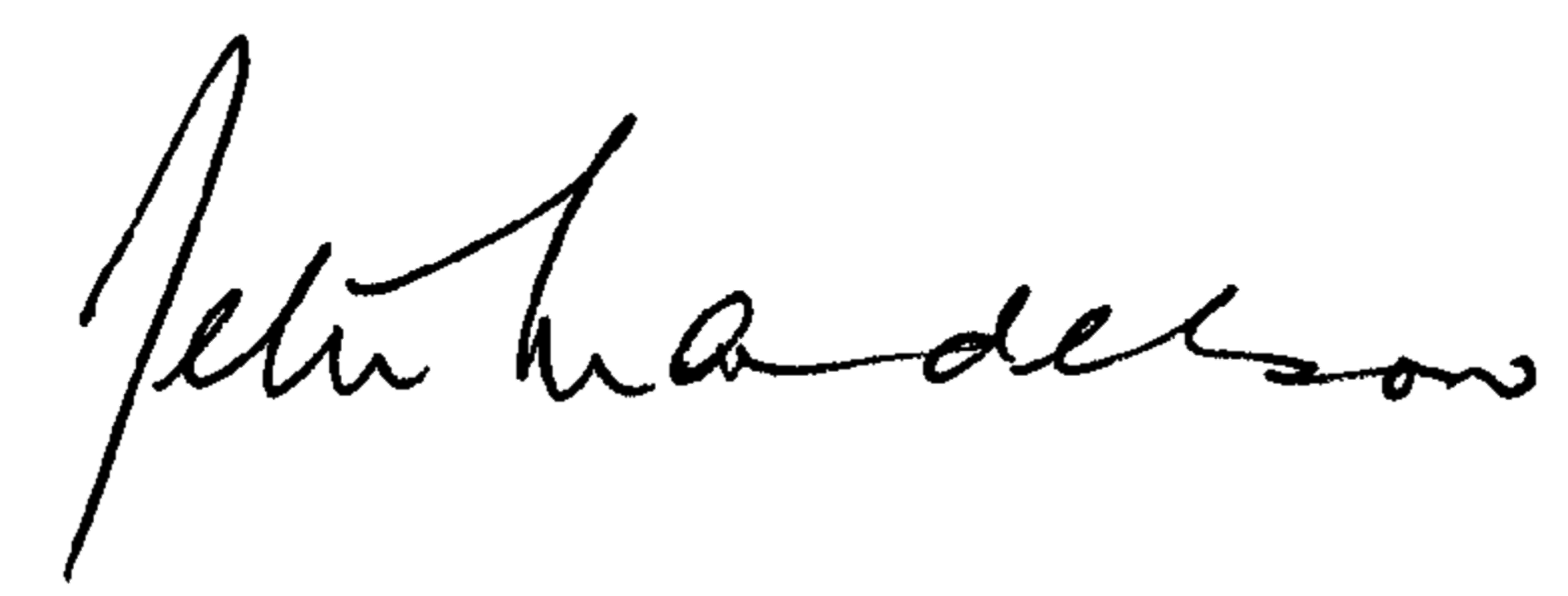
- Signature
- Nicknames: Prince of Darkness; Mandy; The Dark Lord
- Peter Mandelson's voice Mandelson makes a statement on EU-China relations. Recorded 24 October 2006

Peter Benjamin Mandelson, Baron Mandelson (born 21 October 1953), is a British former Labour Party politician, lobbyist and diplomat. He was the Member of Parliament (MP) for Hartlepool from 1992 to 2004. He served in Tony Blair and Gordon Brown's cabinets as Minister without portfolio, Secretary of State for Northern Ireland, Business Secretary and First Secretary of State. He was the British Ambassador to the United States in 2025 under Prime Minister Keir Starmer.

Mandelson served as the Labour Party's director of communications from 1985 to 1990 during the leadership of Neil Kinnock. Sidelined during John Smith's leadership from 1992 to 1994, Mandelson became close to Blair and Brown. He was widely regarded as one of the architects of New Labour and a key adviser to Blair, contributing to the party's election victories in 1997 and 2001.

Mandelson served as Minister without Portfolio from 1997 to 1998, Secretary of State for Business, Innovation and Skills and President of the Board of Trade in 1998 and again from 2008 to 2010, Secretary of State for Northern Ireland from 1999 to 2001, and First Secretary of State and Lord President of the Council from 2009 to 2010. He was European Commissioner for Trade from 2004 to 2008, being elevated to the House of Lords as a life peer in 2008 to serve in the Brown cabinet as business secretary. After Labour lost the 2010 general election, Mandelson co-founded the lobbying firm Global Counsel. He remained active in Labour politics, and was an adviser to Starmer before Labour's return to office at the 2024 general election. During his tenure as ambassador to the United States, Mandelson focused on promoting trade and fostering relationships with the US government during the second presidency of Donald Trump.

Mandelson's career has been marked by controversy, which resulted in his twice resigning from the Cabinet and being dismissed as ambassador in 2025. He bought a home in 1996 partly with an interest-free loan of £373,000 from Geoffrey Robinson, a Cabinet colleague whose business dealings were subject to an inquiry by Mandelson's department. He had not declared the loan in the Register of Members' Interests and resigned in December 1998. In January 2001, he again resigned from the government following accusations of using his position to influence a passport application for S. P. Hinduja.

In September 2025, a scandal arose concerning Mandelson's association with the financier and convicted child sex offender Jeffrey Epstein, which had been reported in 2019. Following reports that Mandelson had continued the friendship following Epstein's 2008 conviction, he was dismissed as ambassador by Starmer. In February 2026, further reports alleged that Mandelson and his husband had received payments from Epstein, and that in 2009 and 2010 Mandelson had passed sensitive government information to Epstein. Mandelson subsequently resigned from the Labour Party and from the House of Lords, and the Metropolitan Police opened an investigation into the allegations. He was later arrested on suspicion of misconduct in public office, then released on bail pending further investigation. In April 2026, it was reported that UKSV had recommended against granting Mandelson security clearance in January 2025, but that officials in the Foreign, Commonwealth and Development Office overruled the recommendation and granted clearance anyway. A government spokesperson said the decision was taken by FCDO officials, and that Prime Minister Starmer was not aware of the override until April 2026.

== Early life and education ==
Peter Benjamin Mandelson was born on 21 October 1953, in Hendon, Middlesex, the younger son of George Norman ("Tony") Mandelson and Mary Joyce. His father George was advertising manager of The Jewish Chronicle and an officer in the Royal Dragoons during the Second World War. His mother Mary was the daughter of Herbert Morrison and his first wife, Margaret Kent. Morrison was a London County Council leader, a member of the War Cabinet as Home Secretary and subsequently a cabinet minister in the Attlee government.

Of Polish Jewish ancestry, Mandelson's grandfather, Norman Mandelson, founded the Harrow United Synagogue. Mandelson was raised in Hampstead Garden Suburb; recalling his childhood, he said "my whole upbringing was framed around the Suburb – my friendships and values."

Mandelson attended the Garden Suburb School, and from 1965 to 1972 Hendon County Grammar School. During his teenage years he joined the Young Communist League due to the UK's support of the United States' role in the Vietnam War. From 1973 to 1976 he read philosophy, politics and economics (PPE) at the University of Oxford where he was a student at St Catherine's College, and his tutors included Nicholas Stern.

== Early career ==
Mandelson worked in the Economic Department of the Trades Union Congress between 1977 and 1978; from 1978 to 1980, he was Chairman of the British Youth Council. In 1978, he was delegated to attend the Soviet-organised World Festival of Youth and Students at Havana, Cuba. He was elected to Lambeth Council at a by-election in 1979 but stood down in 1982, disillusioned with the state of Labour politics during the leadership of Michael Foot. Mandelson then worked from 1982 to 1985 as a television producer at London Weekend Television on Weekend World, where he formed a friendship with his superior John Birt.

== Political career ==
=== Director of communications ===
In 1985, the Labour Party leader Neil Kinnock appointed Mandelson as the party's director of communications. As director, he was one of the first people in Britain to whom the term "spin doctor" was applied, and he was nicknamed the "Prince of Darkness". Mandelson ran the campaign at the 1986 Fulham by-election where Labour defeated the Conservative Party.

For the 1987 general election campaign, Mandelson commissioned the film director Hugh Hudson, whose Chariots of Fire (1981) had won an Oscar as Best Picture, to make a party political broadcast promoting Kinnock as a potential prime minister. Tagged "Kinnock – the Movie", it led to the party leader's approval rating being raised by 16%, to 19%, in polls, and was even repeated in another party political broadcast slot. The election, held on 11 June 1987, returned Margaret Thatcher's Conservatives for the third time, although Labour gained 20 seats, and, this time, convincingly pushed the SDP–Liberal Alliance into third place. Opponents termed the Labour Party's election campaign "a brilliantly successful election defeat". He ceased being a Labour Party official in 1990 when he was selected as Labour candidate for the constituency of Hartlepool, which was then considered a safe seat.

=== Member of Parliament ===
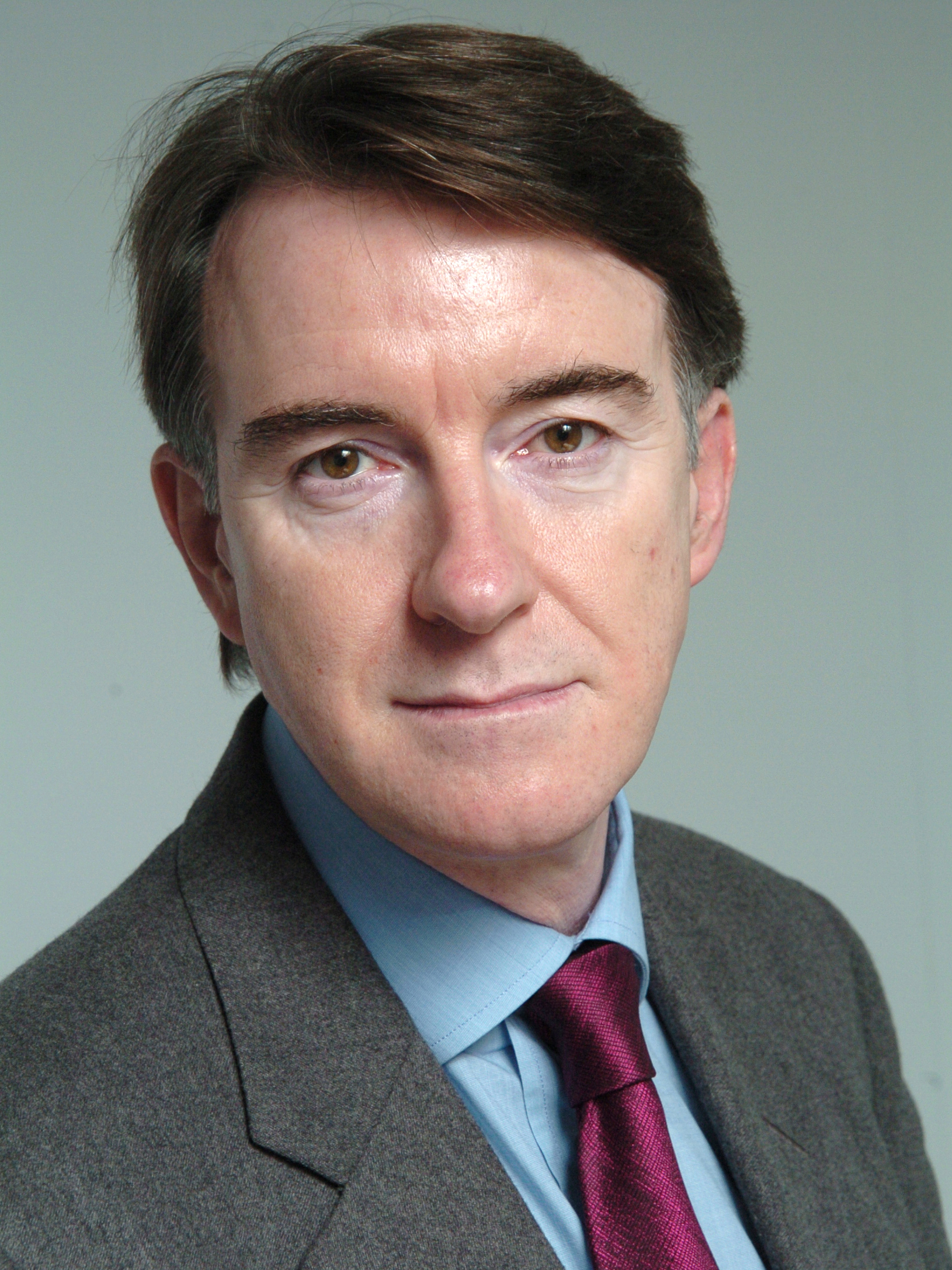
Official European Commission portrait, 2004

Mandelson was first elected to the House of Commons at the 1992 general election which John Major's Conservatives won, and made several speeches outlining his strong support for the European Union. Although sidelined during the brief period when John Smith led the Labour Party, Mandelson was by now close to two shadow cabinet members – Gordon Brown and Tony Blair – each regarded as potential future party leaders. Following Smith's sudden death on 12 May 1994, Mandelson opted to back Blair for the leadership, believing him a superior communicator to Brown, and played a leading role in the leadership campaign. This created acrimony between Mandelson and Brown, though they were considered to be allies in the Labour Party.

In 1994, Kate Garvey suggested that Mandelson (who was at the time being derided by the trades unions and other Labour factions), should adopt a nom de guerre throughout Blair's leadership bid, so that he might conceal his considerable role within the campaign team. Mandelson agreed to be called "Bobby" for the duration and was thanked by Blair using this pseudonym in his victory speech. After becoming a close ally and trusted adviser to Blair, Mandelson was Opposition spokesman on the Civil Service from 1995 to 1997, and was Labour's election campaign director for the 1997 general election, which Labour won decisively. He also won re-election in 2001.

==== Parliamentary expenses ====
During the 2009 expenses scandal, The Daily Telegraph raised questions about the timing of Mandelson's second home allowance claim, dating from 2004, saying, "Lord Mandelson billed the taxpayer for almost £3,000 of work on his constituency home in Hartlepool less than a week after announcing his decision to stand down as an MP." Mandelson said in a statement, "The work done was necessary maintenance. All claims made were reasonable and submitted consistent with parliamentary rules."

=== Minister without Portfolio ===
Mandelson served as a Minister without Portfolio in the Cabinet Office from May 1997 to July 1998, when his job was to co-ordinate government from outside the cabinet. A few months after his appointment, he also acquired responsibility for the Millennium Dome, after Blair decided to go ahead with the project despite the opposition of most of the Cabinet and in the face of media hostility. Jennie Page, the Dome project's chief executive, resigned in February 2000 after a chaotic opening night and disappointing attendance figures. In June 2000, in what was seen as a reference to the close interest in the Dome from Mandelson, known at the time as so-called "Dome Secretary" and his successor Charlie Falconer, Baron Falconer of Thoroton, Page told the House of Commons Select Committee for Culture and Heritage: "I made several attempts to persuade ministers that standing back from the Dome would be good for them as well as good for the Dome".

=== Secretary of State for Trade and Industry ===
In July 1998, Mandelson was appointed to the Cabinet as Secretary of State for Trade and Industry and was sworn of the Privy Council; he launched the Millennium Bug And Electronic Commerce Bill and a Competitiveness White paper, which he described, as "bold, far reaching and absolutely necessary". He also appointed a "Net Tsar" to lead the UK in what he termed the "new industrial revolution". Mandelson reportedly urged Blair to proceed with the Post Office's Horizon IT system, leading to the British Post Office scandal in which thousands of innocent subpostmasters were wrongfully convicted of theft, fraud and false accounting.

==== Undisclosed home loan scandal ====
Mandelson was a friend of Labour MP and aerospace CEO Geoffrey Robinson since 1979 when he was a researcher to Labour MP Albert Booth. Mandelson had previously been financially supported by Robinson while working with trade unions, and had remained in touch with him intermittently. Robinson stated that in 1994 Mandelson wrote to Brown, offering his services and stating to Brown he should not seek leadership of what would become New Labour, and in so doing gravitated towards Tony Blair, causing a rift (also referred to as a "feud" by The Guardian) between Brown and Mandelson.

Mandelson bought a home in an exclusive area of Notting Hill in October 1996 partly with an interest-free unsecured personal loan of £373,000 (£753,144 adjusted for inflation in 2025) from Robinson, whose business dealings were later subject to an inquiry by Mandelson's department. The total value of the home was £475,000 (£959,097 adjusted for inflation in 2025).

In 1996, Mandelson was at a dinner at Robinson's flat, where he discussed difficulties with calls from Tony Blair at early hours, and also in a cri de coeur complained to Robinson that he was miserable in his small flat in Wilmington Square, and about his financial circumstances due to his "modest" salary in New Labour, complaining that he did not have "a flat in which he could relax and entertain his friends". Following this, Robinson queried his intentions:

I asked what he had in mind. He said "Oh there is a place in Notting Hill I would really like, but it's too expensive and there is no-one to help me!" At this point I said that financially I was in a good position and that I might be able to assist if he wanted me to. ... My interpretation of his remark was and remains that he was looking for a loan. I would not say that is why he had come to dinner. But, to judge from the alacrity with which he responded, I do not think I misinterpreted what he said.

Mandelson rang Robinson at 9 am the next morning and asked if [Robinson] would help him buy a house, to which Robinson agreed, saying he would give the loan to Mandelson. Robinson was known for being linked to disgraced former businessman Robert Maxwell, had offshore funds which posed problems during his time in Labour, and was also alleged to have offered similar loans to other members of New Labour's cabinet.

Robinson stated that the loan was offered with no strings attached, with Mandelson in a hurry to buy a property. Robinson said that Mandelson settled on a four-storey house in Northumberland Place in Notting Hill, also stating that "[Mandelson] was quite undaunted at the prospect of so large a burden of debt." as Mandelson had stated he would pay it back with money from an inheritance, a salary he would command in the private sector which could pay the interest and repay the capital, and that also his eventual publication of memoirs would cover the cost, and for that reason Robinson saw Mandelson as "good for the money".

The scandal further elaborated when Mandelson became Secretary of State for Trade and Industry on 27 July 1998 and was responsible for the Department of Trade and Industry's investigation into Robert Maxwell's embezzlement of pension funds, but had failed to recuse himself of the position due to conflict of interests. Robinson commented in his memoir that he was surprised that Mandelson did not declare a conflict of interest due to links between Robinson and Maxwell and stated he should have faced up to it, and in trying to escape from the scandal, blamed him. Robinson had dealings with Maxwell's engineering companies but was not alleged to be involved in any of the embezzlement of pension funds. Robinson stated there were rumours of documents being stolen and efforts to retrieve them, but that ultimately he did not know who released the details of their loan.

The article was published in The Guardian on 22 December 1998, followed by Mandelson going on a press tour immediately after on 22 December to try to salvage his position and minimise the damage done by the Guardian article, which ultimately was fruitless. On the morning of 23 December, Gordon Brown called Robinson and stated the bottom line was that Mandelson was to resign, and that Tony Blair demanded Robinson resign as well. Blair later called Robinson, according to Robinson, stating that he was very disappointed the press saw a scandal in what he saw as a "private arrangement". Mandelson had not declared the loan in the Register of Members' Interests, and had kept the loan from Blair for two years. Mandelson resigned on 23 December 1998, stating in a letter to Blair that "I am sorry about this situation. But we came to power promising to uphold the highest possible standards in public life. We have not just to do so, but we must be seen to do so. Therefore with huge regret I wish to resign. I will always be a loyal Labour man and I am not prepared to see the party and the government suffer the kind of attack this issue has provoked. You can be assured, of course, of my continuing friendship and total loyalty."

Mandelson had also not declared the loan to his lender (the Britannia Building Society) although they decided not to take any action, with the CEO stating: "I am satisfied that the information given to us at the time of the mortgage application was accurate." Mandelson initially thought he could weather the press storm, but had to resign when it became clear that Blair thought nothing else would clear the air. In October 2000, it was reported that Robinson had "accused Peter Mandelson of lying to the Commons about the home loan affair that cost both of them their government jobs." Robinson stated in his 2000 memoir that Mandelson sold the house "for a handsome profit" and repaid the loan.

=== Secretary of State for Northern Ireland ===
Mandelson was out of the Cabinet for ten months. In October 1999 he was appointed Secretary of State for Northern Ireland, replacing Mo Mowlam. In his first speech in the post he mistakenly referred to himself as the "Secretary of State for Ireland". During his tenure he oversaw the creation of the devolved legislative assembly and power-sharing executive and reform of the Police Service of Northern Ireland.

On 24 January 2001, Mandelson resigned from the Government for a second time, following accusations of using his position to influence a passport application, stating "I would only ask people to understand that my sole desire and motivation throughout was to emphasise that I had not sought to influence the decision on naturalisation in any way at all, merely to pass on a request for information and the prime minister is entirely satisfied with this." He had contacted Home Office Minister Mike O'Brien on behalf of Srichand Hinduja, an Indian businessman who was seeking British citizenship and whose family firm was to become the main sponsor of the "Faith Zone" in the Millennium Dome. At the time Hinduja and his brothers were under investigation by the Indian Government for alleged involvement in the Bofors scandal. Mandelson insisted he had done nothing wrong and was exonerated by an independent inquiry by Sir Anthony Hammond, which concluded that neither Mandelson nor anyone else had acted improperly.

At the 2001 general election Mandelson was challenged by Arthur Scargill of the Socialist Labour Party and by John Booth, a former Labour Party press officer standing as "Genuine Labour", but Mandelson was re-elected with a large majority. In his victory speech, Mandelson said: "It was said that I was facing political oblivion ... Well, they underestimated Hartlepool and they underestimated me because I am a fighter and not a quitter." His quote would later be referenced by Liz Truss towards the end of her notably short tenure as prime minister in October 2022.

=== Stepping down as MP ===
Despite Labour's victory at the June 2001 general election, a third Cabinet appointment did not materialise and Mandelson indicated his interest in becoming the United Kingdom's European commissioner when the new Commission was established in 2004. Both of Britain's Commissioners, Neil Kinnock and Chris Patten, were due to stand down. Appointment as a European Commissioner would require his resignation from Parliament, precipitating a by-election in his Hartlepool constituency. His EC appointment was announced in the summer and on 8 September 2004 Mandelson resigned his seat by petitioning to become Steward of the Manor of Northstead. Labour held the seat at the 2004 Hartlepool by-election with a much-reduced majority of 2,033 votes (equating to 40.7% of the vote), being succeeded by Iain Wright as MP for Hartlepool.

=== European Commissioner ===
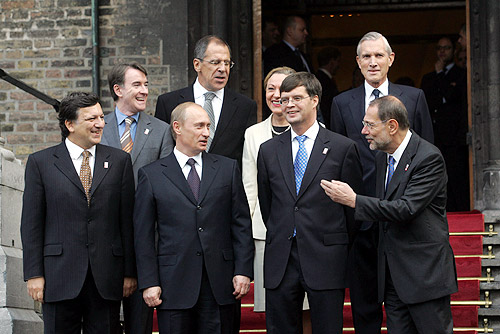
Mandelson with Russian President Vladimir Putin and European Commission President José Manuel Barroso in November 2004

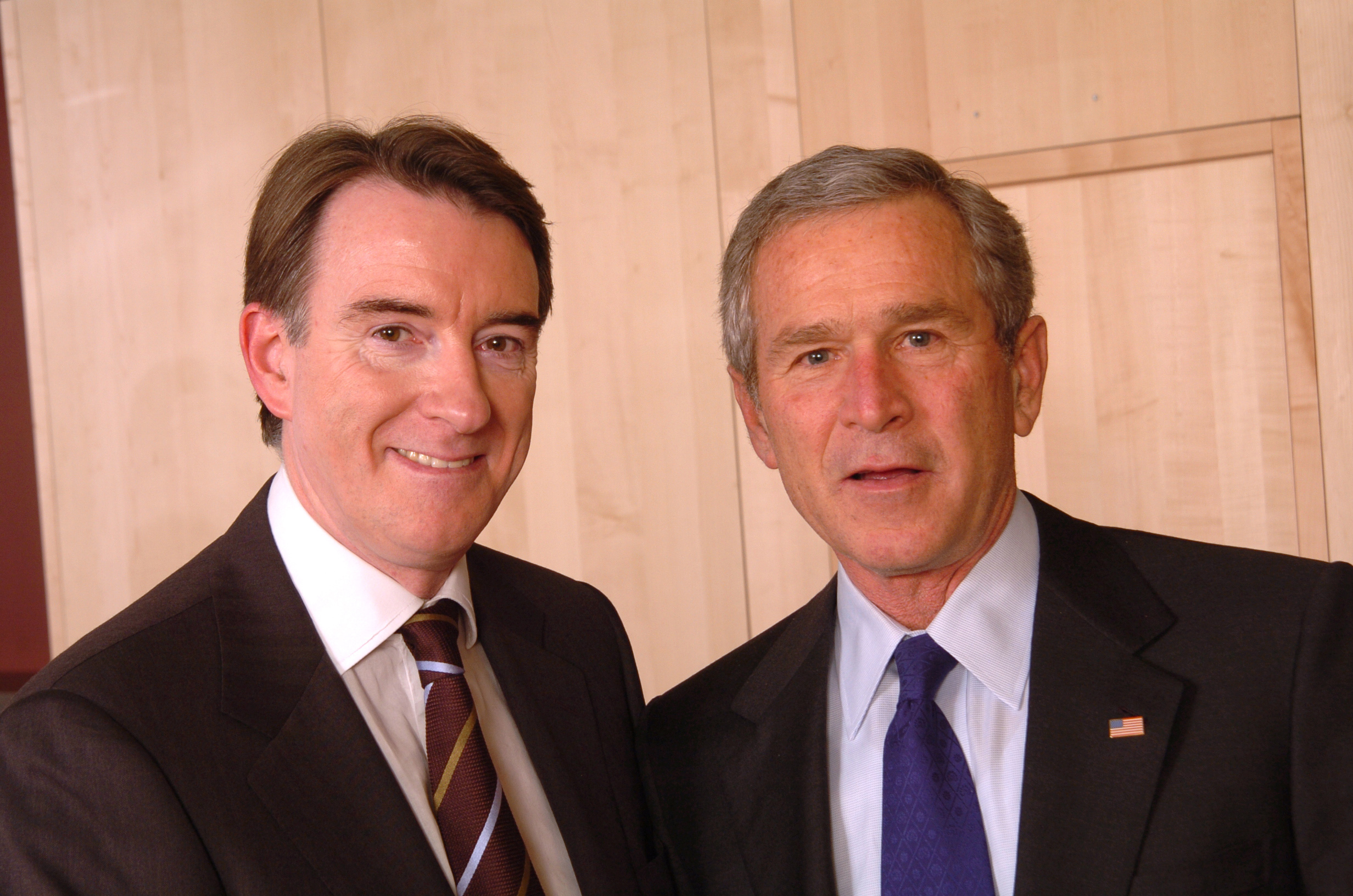
Mandelson and U.S. President George W. Bush in February 2005

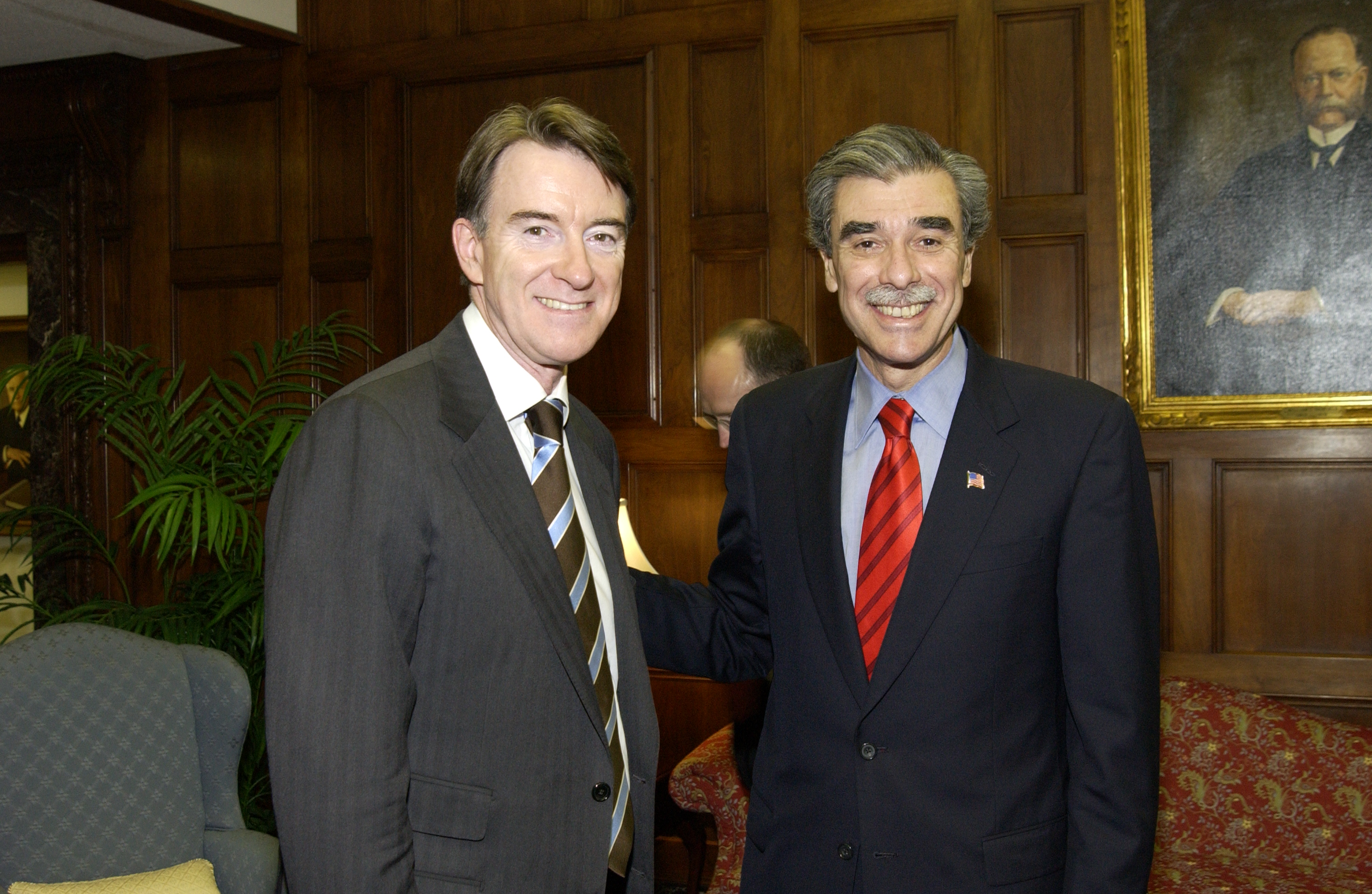
Mandelson with US Secretary of Commerce Carlos Gutierrez in June 2005

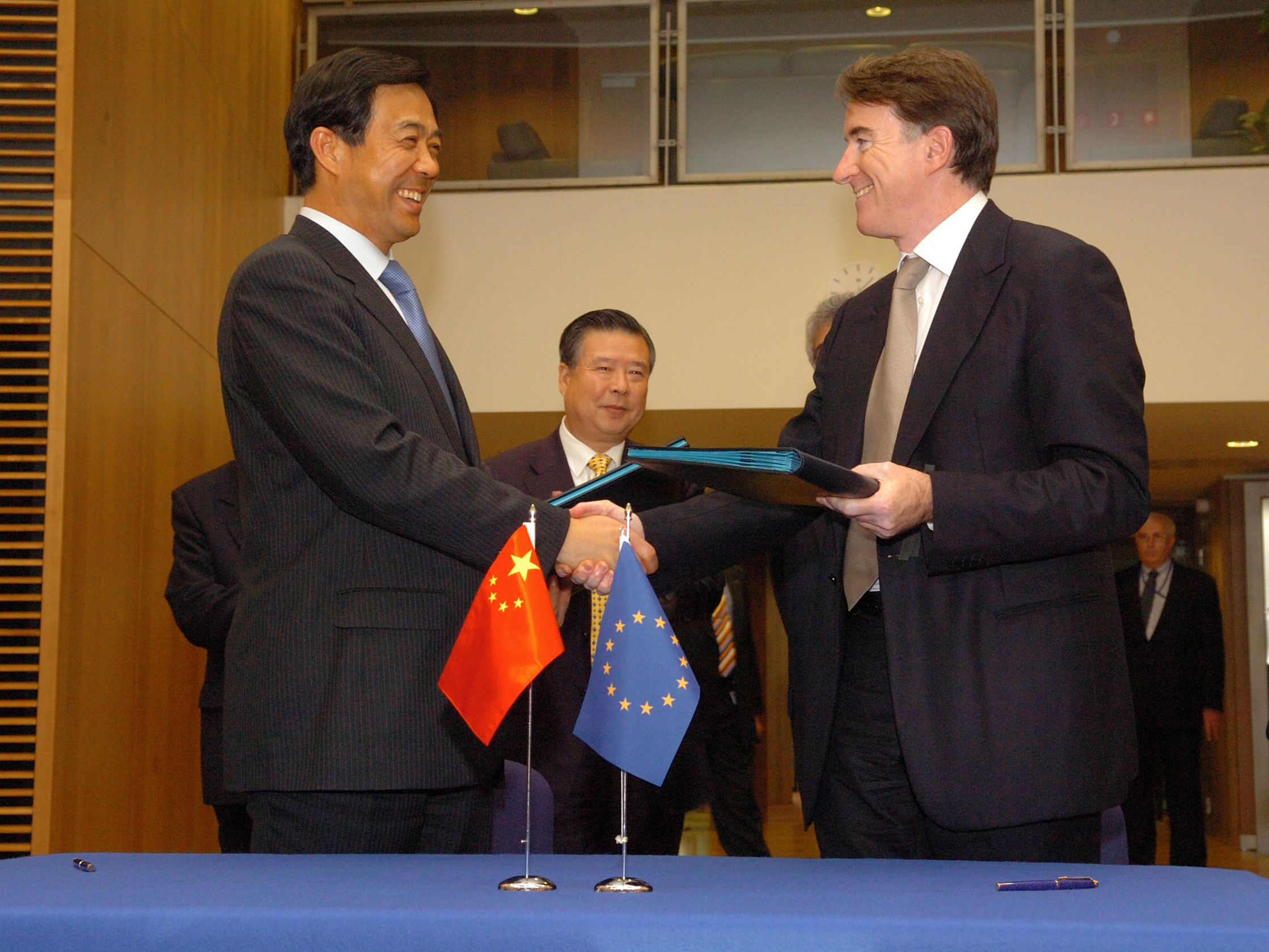
Mandelson with Chinese Minister for Trade Bo Xilai in November 2005

On 22 November 2004, Mandelson became Britain's European Commissioner, taking the trade portfolio. During the summer of 2008, Mandelson had a widely publicised disagreement with Nicolas Sarkozy, President of France. Sarkozy accused him of trying to sell out European farmers and appeared to blame his handling of the Doha round of trade talks for the "no" vote in the Irish referendum on the Treaty of Lisbon. Mandelson said his position at world trade talks had been undermined and told the BBC he did not start the row, saying, "I stood up for myself, I'm not to be bullied", and said he believed the row was over but renewed his warnings on protectionism. In October 2008, he left his post as Trade Commissioner to return to British politics.

==== Allegations of corruption and conflicts of interest ====
The release of the Epstein files in 2026 indicated that Jeffrey Epstein made payments totaling approximately £55,000 to Mandelson or his partner between 2003 and 2004, and also covered educational fees for Mandelson's husband, Reinaldo Avila da Silva. Emails within the files suggested that Mandelson shared sensitive UK government information with Epstein during the aftermath of the 2008 financial crisis, including early notice of a €500 billion EU bank bailout and lobbying efforts regarding a proposed 50% "super tax" on bankers' bonuses. The revelations prompted reactions from former Prime Minister Gordon Brown, who had appointed Mandelson to ministerial positions and the House of Lords, expressing regret over the appointments, and providing evidence to the Metropolitan Police for further inquiry. Amid growing public and political scrutiny, Mandelson resigned from the Labour Party and stepped down from the House of Lords in early February 2026, while a criminal investigation into potential misconduct in public office was started, following which he was arrested.

On 22 April 2005, The Times reported that Mandelson had spent the previous New Year's Eve on the yacht of Paul Allen, the co-founder of Microsoft, a company that was at the centre of a major EU investigation. In 2006, The Daily Mail reported that Mandelson had received a free cruise on a yacht from Diego Della Valle, a controversial Italian mogul, raising questions as Della Valle's businesses (such as luxury shoe brand Tod's) benefited from tariffs imposed shortly thereafter by Mandelson as EU Trade Commissioner on Chinese shoes. In October 2008, Mandelson was the subject of much press speculation when it was reported that British-born Canadian financier Nathaniel Rothschild, 5th Baron Rothschild and the Russian oligarch Oleg Deripaska had met Mandelson when staying on a yacht moored near Corfu, in order to attend a party held by Rothschild. After speculation that this might constitute a conflict of interest for Mandelson, Rothschild wrote a letter to The Times newspaper alleging that another guest was Conservative Shadow Chancellor of the Exchequer George Osborne, who, he said, illicitly tried to solicit a donation from the Russian for his party.

In October 2008, Mandelson was reported to have maintained private contact over several years with Oleg Deripaska, most recently on holiday in August 2008 on Deripaska's yacht at Taverna Agni on the Greek island of Corfu. News of the contacts sparked criticism because, as European Union Trade Commissioner, Mandelson had been responsible for two decisions to cut aluminium tariffs that had benefited Deripaska's United Company Rusal. Mandelson denied that there had been a conflict of interest and said that he had never discussed aluminium tariffs with Deripaska. On 26 October 2008 the Shadow Foreign Secretary William Hague said the "whole country" wanted "transparency" about Mandelson's previous meetings with Deripaska. In response, Prime Minister Gordon Brown said Mandelson's dealings with Deripaska had been "found to be above board". Mandelson said that meeting business figures from "across the range" in emerging economies was part of his brief as EU Trade Commissioner. On 29 October 2008, while Mandelson was on a ministerial visit to Moscow, it was alleged in the British press that Valery Pechenkin, the head of security at Deripaska's company Basic Element, had organised a swift entry visa for Mandelson when he turned up in Moscow to visit Deripaska in 2005.

==== Alleged conflict of interest around pension ====
As a former EU Commissioner, Mandelson became entitled to a £31,000 pension upon reaching the age of 65. It was reported in 2009, after Mandelson had returned to the British government, that his pension was contingent on a "duty of loyalty to the Communities", which also applied after his term in office. The TaxPayers' Alliance demanded that he should declare this a conflict of interest and either relinquish his EU payments or resign as a minister. Mandelson did not agree that he had a conflict of interest. The website Full Fact reported in 2019 that the claim was incorrect, stating that while there are rules governing the conduct of current and former EU staff members, which can lead to pensions sanctions, the European Commission had informed them that it would be "probably impossible" for such people to lose their pension for criticising the EU or supporting Brexit. Full Fact also pointed out that there had been multiple cases of current and former commissioners criticising the EU.

=== Peerage and return to Cabinet ===
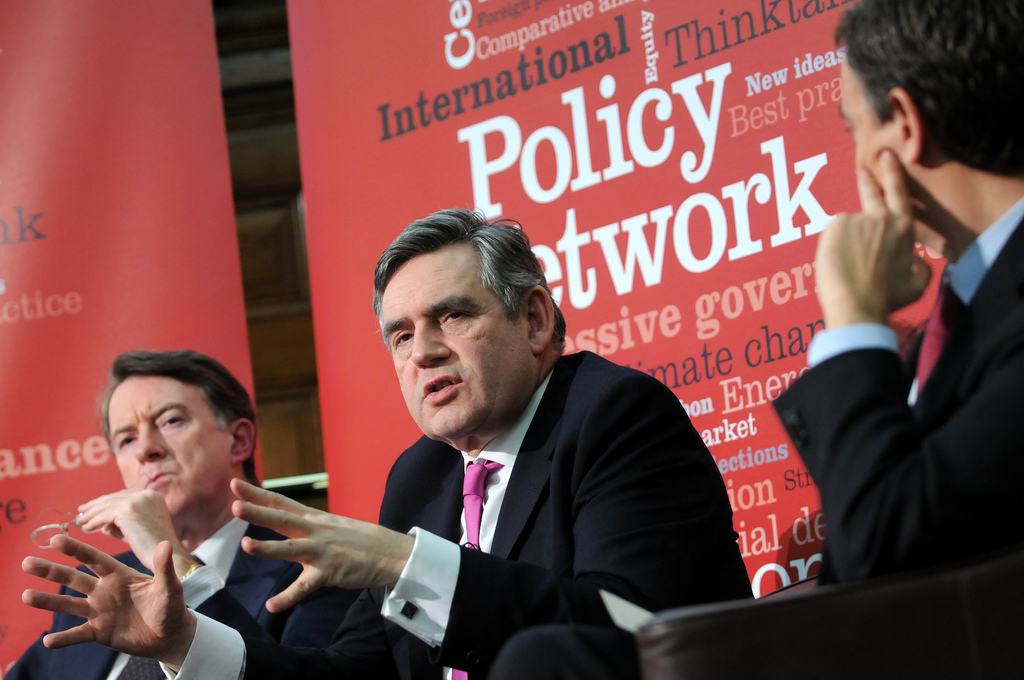
Mandelson (left) with Gordon Brown at the Progressive Governance Conference, February 2010

On 3 October 2008, as part of Gordon Brown's Cabinet reshuffle it was announced, amid some controversy and surprise, that Mandelson would return to Government in the re-designated post of Business Secretary and would be raised to the peerage, thus becoming a member of the House of Lords. His return surprised many due to his long-standing political rivalry with Brown. On 13 October 2008 he was created Baron Mandelson, of Foy in the County of Herefordshire and of Hartlepool in the County of Durham, being introduced in the House of Lords the same day. Following his return to office, Mandelson supported the planned Heathrow expansion. On 6 March 2009, environmental protester Leila Deen of anti-aviation group Plane Stupid approached him outside a summit on the government's low-carbon industrial strategy and threw a cup of green custard in his face in protest over his support for a third runway at Heathrow Airport. The protester was cautioned on 9 April for causing "harassment, alarm or distress".

In a Cabinet reshuffle on 5 June 2009 Mandelson was appointed Lord President of the Council with the honorary title of First Secretary of State; it was also announced that the Department for Innovation, Universities and Skills would be merged into his, affording him the new title of Secretary of State for Business, Innovation and Skills and that he would continue as President of the Board of Trade. Mandelson was a member of 35 of the 43 Cabinet committees and subcommittees.

In August 2009, Mandelson was widely reported to have ordered "technical measures" such as internet disconnection to be included in the draft of the Digital Economy Act 2010 after a "big lobbying operation", even though the Digital Britain report had rejected this type of punishment. The Independent reported that according to their Whitehall sources, Mandelson was persuaded that tough laws were needed to reduce online copyright infringement following an intensive lobbying campaign by influential people in the music and film industry. The paper also reported that this included a meeting with DreamWorks co-founder David Geffen at the Rothschild family villa on the Greek island of Corfu. Mandelson's spokesperson claimed that there had been no discussion of internet piracy during the Corfu dinner and suggested that the decision to reverse Lord Carter's findings had been taken in late July before the trip. The Times reported after the Corfu meeting that an unnamed Whitehall source had confirmed that before this trip, Mandelson had shown little personal interest in the Digital Britain agenda, which has been ongoing for several years. According to the source of The Times, Mandelson returned from holiday and effectively issued an edict that the regulation needed to be tougher.

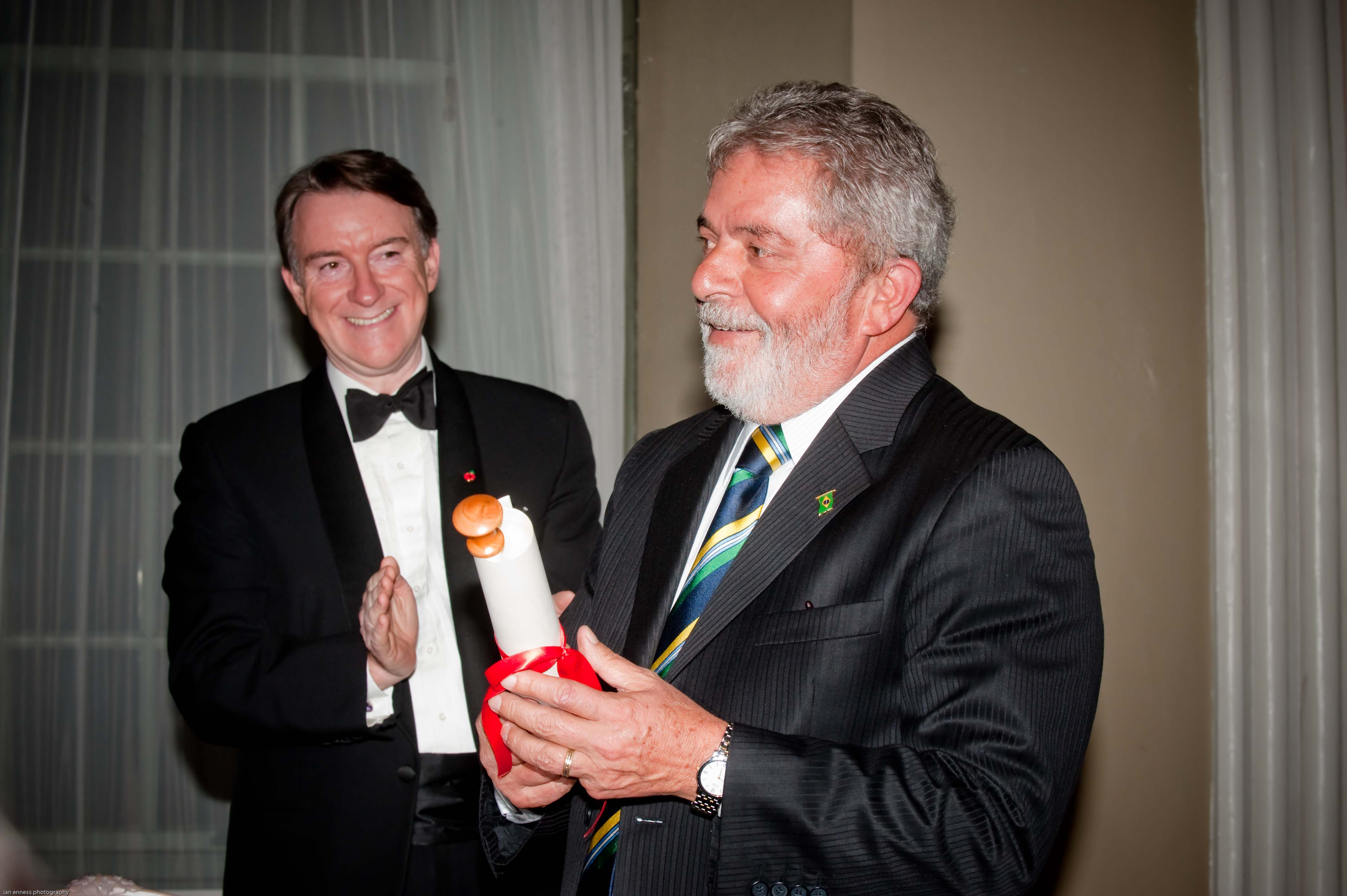
Mandelson with Brazilian President Luiz Inácio Lula da Silva

In August 2011, a Freedom of Information (FOI) request showed that Mandelson had decided to approve the inclusion of technical measures, such as the disconnection of internet access, at least two months before public consultation had finished and that he had shown little interest in the consultation. Letters from Mandelson's office document talks with Sir Lucian Grainge, CEO of Universal Music Group, on 2 June 2009 and that on the following day Mandelson advised Lord Carter about the "possibility of [the Secretary of State] having a power to direct OfCom to go directly to introduce technical measures". Mandelson made the formal announcement that technical measures, including disconnection, were to be included in the Digital Economy Bill two months later on 7 August 2009.

An opinion poll conducted by the centre-left think tank Compass found in March 2009 that Mandelson was less disliked by Labour Party members than deputy leader Harriet Harman. This was felt to be unusual as Mandelson "historically has been unpopular among Labour members". Blair's assertion in 1996 that "my project will be complete when the Labour Party learns to love Peter Mandelson" was seen as prophetic in late September 2009 when Mandelson was enthusiastically received at the party conference in Brighton. Documents reported in February 2026 appeared to show that Mandelson lobbied JPMorgan Chase, while Business Secretary in April 2010, to underwrite the floatation of a £700M mining investment vehicle which was launched by Mandelson's friend Nat Rothschild, to the London Stock Exchange.

=== Post-Cabinet ===
==== Advisory, lobbying and directorships ====
In November 2010, Mandelson and Benjamin Wegg-Prosser founded Global Counsel, a London-based lobbying firm with the financial support of WPP, the advertising giant. The firm provides advice for corporate strategists and senior management worldwide. The firm was valued at about GBP 30 million when the Messina Group run by Jim Messina bought a 20 percent stake in 2024.

Lord Mandelson has been criticised for not revealing his clientele. As a corporate lobbyist, he personally helped clients such as Shein, Shell, Palantir, Alibaba, TikTok, and the UK private water industry obtain meetings with ministers and senior officials.

In May 2012, Mandelson confirmed that he was advising Asia Pulp & Paper (APP) in selling timber products to Europe. In that year, APP was accused of illegal logging in Indonesia and damaging the habitats of rare animals such as the Sumatran tiger. At least 67 companies worldwide, such as Tesco and Kraft Foods since 2004 and Danone since 2012, have boycotted APP. In April 2014, it was reported that Mandelson had strong ties to Russian conglomerate Sistema. Mandelson was criticised for being a member of the House of Lords while running a lobbying firm. In 2021, he was the only Labour peer to vote against an amendment denouncing the alleged human right violation in Xinjiang. Mandelson served as a senior adviser to the investment bank Lazard from January 2011 until March 2022. In 2013, Mandelson also joined the Board of Trustees of Deutsche Bank's Alfred Herrhausen Gesellschaft.

==== Political activities and views ====
After Labour lost the 2010 general election and the Conservative–Liberal Democrat coalition was formed, Mandelson's memoirs, The Third Man: Life at the Heart of New Labour, were published in July 2010. The memoirs were criticised by Labour leadership contenders Ed and David Miliband, and by Andy Burnham. During this time, Mandelson was appointed president of the international think tank Policy Network. In 1999, 2008, 2009, 2011, 2012, 2013, and 2014, Mandelson was an invited guest of the Bilderberg Group and attended the annual conferences. In May 2011, there was speculation that Mandelson had been approached by China to be a candidate for the leadership of the International Monetary Fund, even though he had not served as a finance minister or headed a central bank. It was then speculated in March 2012 that Mandelson's name might be put forward to succeed Pascal Lamy as Director-General of the World Trade Organization, backed by David Cameron. In June 2013, writing for the Progress website, Mandelson warned Labour it risked harming its election chances if affiliated trade unions continued to "manipulate parliamentary selections" as was alleged in the 2013 Labour Party Falkirk candidate selection controversy.

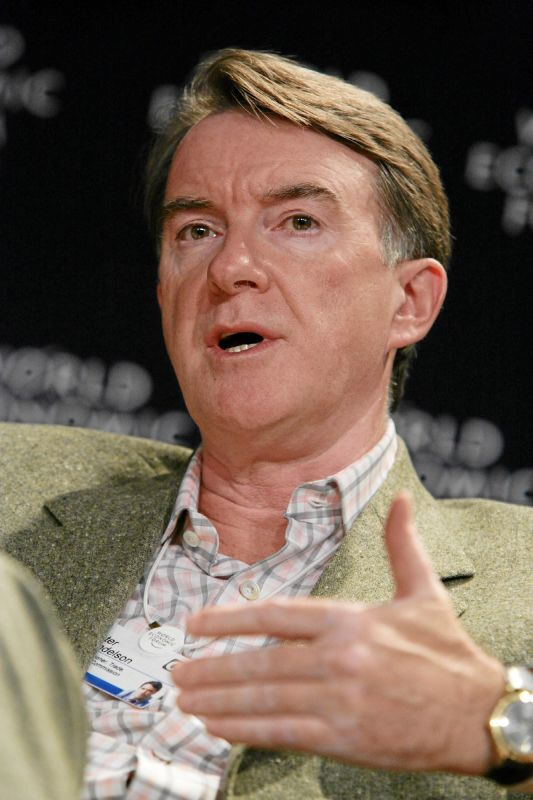
Mandelson in 2007

After the 2015 Labour leadership election resulted in Jeremy Corbyn becoming the party leader, Mandelson stated that he believed that Labour was now unelectable, but advised party members unhappy with the situation to wait for Corbyn to demonstrate this before working to replace him. He wished for an early general election to force Corbyn out. In February 2017, he said Corbyn had "no idea in the 21st century how to conduct himself as a leader of a party putting itself forward in a democratic election" and "I work every single day to bring forward the end of [Corbyn's] tenure in office". After the results of the 2017 general election became known, Mandelson conceded that Corbyn's election campaign was "very sure-footed" and the result, in which Labour gained seats and denied the Conservatives a majority, unexpected. "I was wrong" about Corbyn, he told BBC News. "I am very surprised, an earthquake has happened in British politics and I did not foresee it", although he doubted Corbyn's ability to gain a Commons majority. Two years later, at the 2019 general election, Labour suffered their worst defeat since the 1930s. Mandelson described the result as "not undeserved", arguing that Corbyn's leadership was one of the main reasons for Labour's defeat.

During the 2016 EU referendum, Mandelson sat on the board of Britain Stronger in Europe, the official "Remain" campaign, which was unsuccessful. Following the Brexit referendum, Mandelson was an outspoken advocate for a second referendum. After Roberto Azevêdo announced he would step down as Director-General of the World Trade Organization (WTO) in September 2020, Mandelson declared an interest in succeeding him. He proceeded to lobby governments around the world for the role, arguing that the WTO had "reached a fork in the road" and had to be "picked up and put back on its feet". Mandelson, an opponent of Brexit, was overlooked in favour of the Conservative Liam Fox: his prospective candidacy ceased when Fox secured the UK Government's nomination.

After the 2020 Labour leadership election resulted in Keir Starmer becoming the party leader, it was reported the following year that Mandelson had been advising Starmer on moving the party beyond Corbyn's leadership and broadening its electoral appeal. In 2023, Mandelson was one of the regular guests of the weekly podcast How to win an election from The Times, presented by Matt Chorley and alongside Polly Mackenzie and Danny Finkelstein. He was described as having a "significant influence" on Starmer's office as a "core part" of his political network, and was an adviser to Starmer for several years before Labour's 2024 general election victory. In the lead-up to the election in June 2024, Mandelson warned against public overconfidence in a Labour victory, echoing a strategy used by Blair before the 1997 election. Appearing on the BBC, he stated, "I don't believe the polls for one moment". Mandelson also publicly campaigned for Labour by reassuring voters that the party had changed under Starmer and was a "safe" option for government after years of Conservative rule. Speaking before the election, he correctly predicted a public appetite for change that would lead to a Labour victory, similar to the major political shifts seen in 1979 and 1997.

==== Ambassadorship to the United States ====
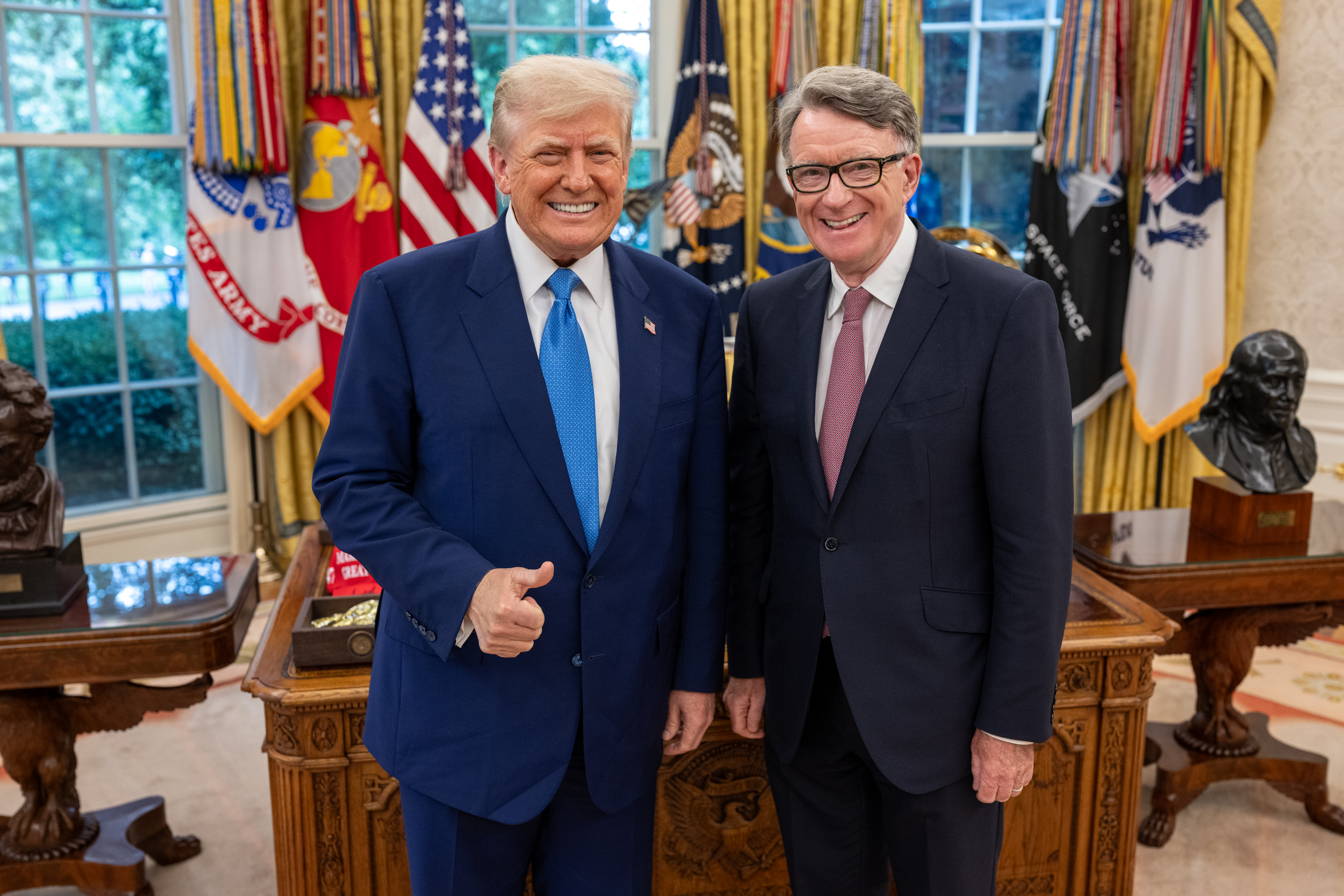
Mandelson and US President Donald Trump in June 2025

In December 2024, Mandelson was appointed HM Ambassador to the United States by Starmer, to replace Karen Pierce who was rotated out of her post as the British ambassador to the US and appointed as the Prime Minister's Special Envoy to the Western Balkans; the new Labour government had annulled the appointment of Tim Barrow upon taking power. Appointed shortly before Donald Trump's return to the White House in January 2025, Mandelson was tasked with managing the crucial UK–US "special relationship". He worked to build connections within the new administration, including meetings with Trump himself. Mandelson's role involved strengthening the historic alliance between the two nations, particularly regarding economic growth and security.

As a veteran on trade issues, Mandelson's appointment was aimed at helping the UK secure trade opportunities with the US. He assumed the ambassadorship on 10 February 2025, following the presidential transition. Previously opposed to Trump and describing him as "little short of a white nationalist and racist", as "reckless and a danger to the world", and likening him to a bully, Mandelson revised his opinion, publicly asserting his respect for Trump, according to the will of the people. Trump appeared to enjoy a warm relationship with Mandelson, praising him during an Oval Office meeting in May 2025. In December 2024, a Trump campaign adviser had publicly referred to Mandelson as an "absolute moron".

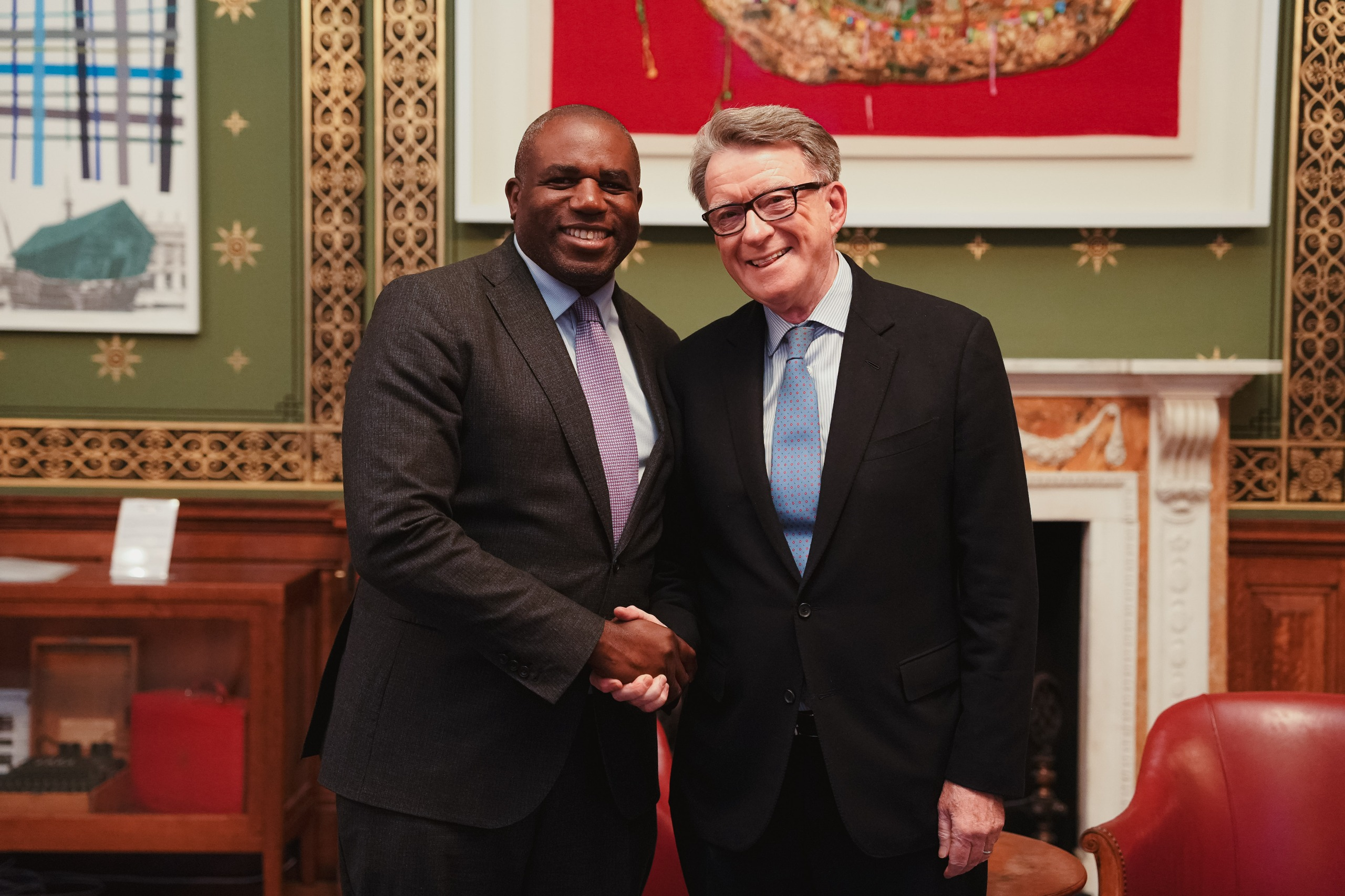
Mandelson with UK Foreign Secretary David Lammy in February 2025

During his short tenure as ambassador, Mandelson focused on promoting trade and fostering relationships with the US government during Trump's second presidency. Mandelson played a significant role in helping to formulate the details of a trade deal between the two countries following Trump enacting a series of steep tariffs affecting nearly all goods imported into the country, which was praised as a key achievement of his ambassadorship.

In April 2026, The Guardian reported that, in January 2025, during the process of his appointment as ambassador to the United States, Mandelson failed his developed vetting (DV) conducted by United Kingdom Security Vetting (UKSV). A formal decision to deny him security clearance was issued on 28 January 2025. However, the Foreign, Commonwealth and Development Office (FCDO) overruled the decision within 48 hours, exercising its rare authority to do so. The vetting process had required full disclosure of his personal finances, business connections, and sexual history. A prior Cabinet Office propriety and ethics review had raised concerns about his professional and financial relationships, reputational risks — including his association with Epstein — and aspects of his past roles. These issues were dismissed by Starmer. In February 2025, Starmer publicly stated that Mandelson had received clearance from "independent security vetting". It is unknown whether Mandelson was informed of the UKSV decision to deny him clearance. The Guardian said that senior government officials were considering withholding documents from the parliamentary intelligence and security committee (ISC), in violation of a vote which proposed that "all papers" relevant to Mandelson's appointment be released and that those "prejudicial to UK national security or international relations" should be provided to the ISC, without withholding any documents from the committing.

==== Jeffrey Epstein friendship scandal, dismissal and investigation ====
In September 2025, revelations about the extent of Mandelson's long-standing association with the American financier and sex offender Jeffrey Epstein ultimately resulted in Mandelson's dismissal as the British ambassador to the United States. Their friendship, which had been publicly known about to some extent for some years, spanned at least from 2002 to 2011 and continued after Epstein's first conviction in 2008. Renewed scrutiny and public criticism followed the release of American court documents and a cache of private emails by the US House Oversight Committee.

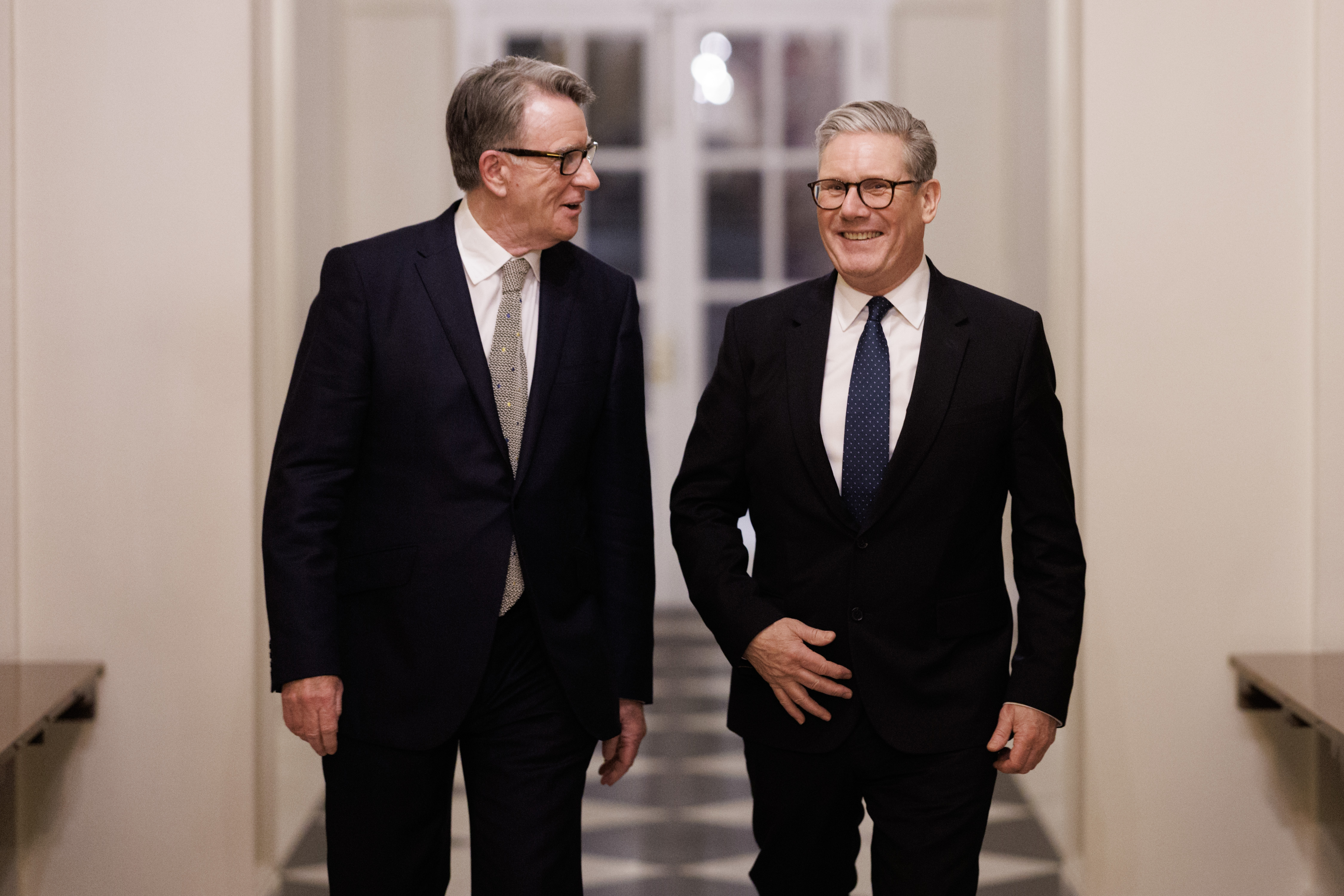
Prime Minister Keir Starmer faced significant political pressure regarding Mandelson's appointment and stated that Mandelson's support of Epstein contradicted the British government's stance on violence against women and girls.

The released documents detailed the depth and nature of Mandelson's relationship with Epstein, particularly after Epstein's 2008 conviction in Florida for soliciting prostitution from a minor. Among the most damaging disclosures were a 2003 entry in Epstein's birthday book, in which Mandelson described him as his "best pal", and emails from 2008 in which Mandelson wrote that he "thought the world of him", and encouraged him to "fight for early release" from his 18‑month sentence. It also emerged that Epstein had paid for Mandelson's travel in 2003 and that Mandelson had reportedly sought Epstein's assistance with a banking deal while serving as a UK Cabinet minister in 2010.

The revelations placed significant pressure on Starmer, who had appointed Mandelson as ambassador to the United States in late 2024 and had initially expressed full confidence in him. The government stated that the newly published emails provided "materially different" information about the extent of the relationship, particularly Mandelson's suggestion that Epstein's conviction had been wrongful. After Mandelson refused to resign, on 11 September 2025 Starmer dismissed him, describing the emails as "reprehensible" and saying that Mandelson's responses to official questions had been unsatisfactory. Mandelson expressed deep regret for the association and "profound sympathy" for Epstein's victims, stating that he had been "taken in" by a "charismatic criminal liar".

In a BBC interview in January 2026, Mandelson said he had never seen young women or girls at Epstein's properties and had been unaware of Epstein's sexual crimes. Mandelson stated that as he was gay, the extent of Epstein's crimes was hidden from him. Asked whether he wished to apologize, he expressed sympathy for the victims' suffering but said he did not feel the need to apologize as he had neither known of the abuse nor been complicit in it. He stated that he understood why he had been dismissed and accepted the decision. Later in January 2026, a further release of documents relating to Epstein appeared to show that Mandelson and his then partner, Reinaldo da Silva, had received at least $75,000 in payments from Epstein. The documents also revealed that Mandelson, then serving as business secretary, had lobbied government ministers to amend policy on bankers' bonuses at Epstein's request. Mandelson resigned his membership of the Labour Party on 1 February 2026 due to his relationship with Epstein.

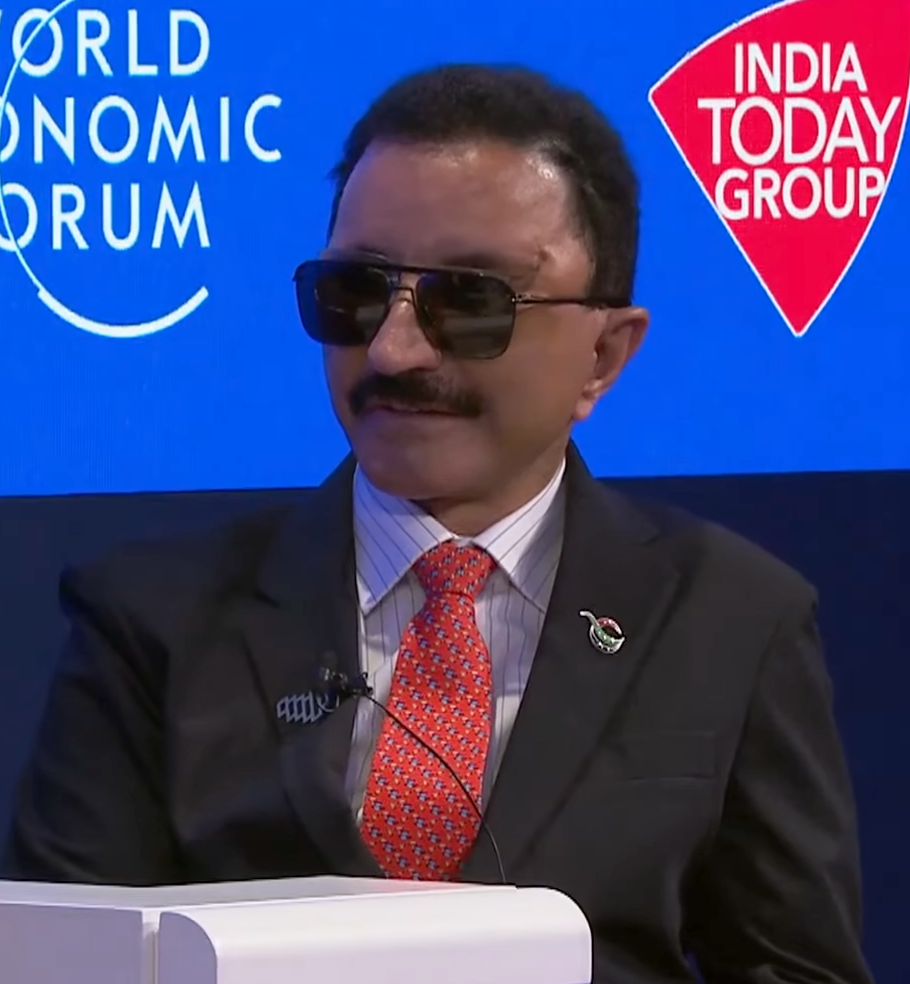
Epstein acted as a middleman, helping Dubai's DP World CEO Sultan Ahmed bin Sulayem lobby Mandelson—who had become the UK Business Secretary—for government support of the London Gateway port project.

On 13 June 2009, Mandelson allegedly leaked to Epstein a high-level Downing Street document that proposed £20bn of asset sales and revealed Labour's tax policy plans. The memo was written on 13 June 2009 by Nick Butler, who was a special adviser to then British prime minister Gordon Brown from 2009 to 2010. Mandelson forwarded another email sent to Brown's secret Downing Street email address by Shriti Vadera. A December 2009 email from Mandelson suggested that JPMorgan Chase boss Jamie Dimon should "mildly threaten" the then-Chancellor of the Exchequer Alistair Darling over a bankers' bonus tax. The pressure was reportedly exerted through references to the role of US banks as buyers of UK gilts, as well as investment plans in London. On 31 March 2010, Mandelson allegedly forwarded confidential minutes of a meeting between the Chancellor of the Exchequer, Alistair Darling, and the Director of the US National Economic Council, Larry Summers, five minutes after he received them, which discussed new banking regulation and taxation that Summers wanted to see, in addition to discussion on how the US should engage with France and Germany. The following day, on 1 April 2010, Mandelson met Summers, and forwarded the minutes of his meeting two minutes after he received them.

Documents released by the US Department of Justice show that Epstein acted as an intermediary to help UAE's DP World CEO Sultan Ahmed bin Sulayem lobby the UK government in 2009 for support regarding the £1.8 billion London Gateway port project. Epstein reportedly shared the personal email address of Peter Mandelson - who was then the UK Business Secretary - with bin Sulayem and advised him on how to push through a deal. Emails indicate Epstein told Mandelson to "be nice to Sultan" in October 2009. The lobbying effort was aimed at securing government loan guarantees for the DP World deep-water port project on the Thames in Essex. The project went ahead, and DP World currently runs the London Gateway port.

On 9 May 2010, Mandelson gave Epstein advance notice of a €500bn bailout from the EU to save the Euro. On 10 May 2010, Mandelson emailed Epstein saying "finally got him to go today", with Gordon Brown resigning the following day. Mark Rowley, the head of the Metropolitan Police, said that the email represented a "potential criminal offence" and that the investigation would be conducted "without fear or favour". In another email on 10 May 2010, Mandelson appeared to reveal to Epstein the existence of a secret underground tunnel between 10 Downing Street and the Ministry of Defence.

On 2 February 2026, Reform UK and the Scottish National Party reported Mandelson to the Metropolitan Police, calling on them to investigate the leaking of confidential Downing Street files, and whether he may have committed misconduct in public office, pertaining to his time in Cabinet. On 3 February 2026, the Cabinet Office referred material to the police which contained market sensitive information surrounding the 2008 financial crisis and official activities thereafter to stabilise the economy. On the same day he stepped down as a peer from the House of Lords, and the Metropolitan Police began a criminal investigation. On 6 February 2026, Benjamin Wegg-Prosser, CEO of Global Counsel, the advisory firm established by Mandelson, resigned due to recent revelations about the firm's links with Epstein; On the same day, Mandelson's shares in Global Counsel were bought by Rebecca Park for £250,000 as a down payment. Under the deal with Park, Mandelson would receive £4.5 million if Park sold the shares. It is reported Mandelson kept the £250,000 paid by Park. 13 days later, the 100-strong firm confirmed it was going into administration after clients severed relationships over Epstein. It was also reported that Mandelson lobbied the US government in March 2010 to water down proposed restrictions on US bank trading activities, on behalf of Epstein and Jes Staley.

On 18 February 2026, the European Commission asked the European Anti-Fraud Office (OLAF) to look into Mandelson's time as European Commissioner. On 23 February, Mandelson was arrested on suspicion of misconduct in public office by leaking confidential emails to Epstein while he was Business Secretary. He was questioned in custody and later released on bail pending further investigation. Scotland Yard had received information that he had been planning to fly to the British Virgin Islands, which he denied. On 6 March 2026 he had his bail conditions lifted and his passport returned, remaining under investigation. He was formally removed from the Privy Council on 10 March.

==== Investigation ====
The Metropolitan Police is seeking the cooperation of the US Department of Justice for the investigation into Mandelson. The communication between UK and US authorities is the first step before formal requests are made including mutual legal assistance treaty or MLAT requests.

==== US foreign policy praise ====
In his first statements since his dismissal as ambassador to the United States, in January 2026 Mandelson accused European leaders of a "histrionic" reaction to Donald Trump's plan to take over Greenland. Mandelson stated that if Europe's leaders argued without "hard power and hard cash" they would continue to slide into unimportance in the "age of Trump". He also suggested that Trump had achieved "more in a day than orthodox diplomacy was able to achieve in the past decade" when he captured Nicolás Maduro.

== Personal life ==
Mandelson is gay and in the late 1990s was said to be "intensely private" about his personal life. Mandelson married Reinaldo Avila da Silva, a Brazilian translator, on 28 October 2023, after having lived in London with him since March 1998. The pair met in the Caribbean in the mid '90s when Mandelson was an MP and da Silva was an international student in London. The couple have a collie dog named Jock.

In 2008 Mandelson was hospitalised, suffering from kidney stone disease, shortly after drinking a glass of Chinese yoghurt in front of reporters in order to show his confidence in Chinese dairy products, which were being banned in Europe due to a concern over deliberate addition of melamine. The melamine was added to make otherwise diluted milk appear as though it had the correct amount of protein, but had caused ailments - including deaths - in Chinese children. Though his own condition was unrelated to melamine in dairy products, the media reported on the connection. Mandelson was guest of honour in 2011 at Herbert Morrison Primary School in Vauxhall, South London, which was hosting a special themed day in honour of Mandelson's grandfather, Herbert Morrison, after whom the school was named.

=== Attempted outings and harassment ===
While his sexual orientation was known to friends, colleagues and constituents, in 1987 the News of the World ran an issue that attempted to out Mandelson as gay. Mandelson did not respond. Mandelson was outed again by Matthew Parris in 1998 on the BBC programme Newsnight. This led to press harassment of his partner, with the Daily Express sending a reporter to take pictures of him while he was at his languages course. An internal investigation later found that the photos had been obtained without Avila da Silva's consent and images of him attempting to cover his face had been secretly deleted. Mandelson phoned the BBC and the Press Complaints Commission following Newsnight's broadcast, and an internal memo was later sent within the BBC, stating: "under no circumstances whatsoever should allegations about the private life of Peter Mandelson be repeated or referred to on any broadcast."

=== Urination incident ===
In April 2026, months after his sacking from Starmer's cabinet, Mandelson faced a fixed penalty notice of £300 for urinating in public. Mandelson was photographed urinating while standing outside the home of former chancellor George Osborne in November 2025. The Royal Borough of Kensington and Chelsea intended to fine Mandelson, yet had not issued the fine because they had "struggled to find his address." Mandelson later blamed his actions on being stood up by an Uber driver when he was "bursting for a pee", and expressed embarrassment over the incident.

== Rescinded honorary roles ==
Mandelson served until 8 October 2008 as President of the Central School of Speech and Drama. In 2013, he was appointed to the revived post of High Steward of Hull, an ancient ceremonial position held by his grandfather in 1956–65 and defunct since 1974. In September 2025, following the Epstein revelations, he was stripped of the role.

Mandelson served as Chancellor of Manchester Metropolitan University from 2016 to 2024. In September 2025, following the Epstein revelations, the university rescinded his honorary doctorate and commemorative medal.

Mandelson contested the 2024 University of Oxford Chancellor election, which William Hague won; Mandelson finished fourth out of thirty-eight candidates. It was later reported that Mandelson had lobbied numerous Labour government ministers in an attempt to secure the role.

Mandelson was appointed as an honorary fellow of his alma mater, St Catherine's College, Oxford in April 2018. In November 2025, following the Epstein revelations, he resigned.

== In the media ==
- BBC Four's Storyville (2010), Mandelson: The Real PM?, directed by Hannah Rothschild, is a fly-on-the-wall documentary about Mandelson as business secretary in the run up to the 2010 general election.
- Mandelson was portrayed by Paul Rhys in the 2003 Channel 4 drama The Deal.
- Mandelson was portrayed by Mark Gatiss in the 2015 Channel 4 drama Coalition.
- Mandelson was portrayed by Nigel Planer in the 2011 comedy drama The Hunt for Tony Blair.
- The Little Britain character Sebastian Love was based on Mandelson.

== Honours ==
- Appointed as a Member of Her Majesty's Most Honourable Privy Council (1998, struck out on 10 March 2026)
- Life peerage, as a baron (2008)
- Grand Officer, Order of the Star of Italy (2016)
- Officer, Légion d'honneur (2017)
- Received the Honorary Degree of Doctor of Letters (D.Litt.) from Manchester Metropolitan University (13 June 2016, revoked on 12 September 2025)
- Freedom of the Borough of Hartlepool (12 March 2010, revoked on 2 October 2025)

== Bibliography ==
- (with Roger Liddle) The Blair Revolution: Can New Labour Deliver? Faber, 1996 ISBN 978-0571178186
  - The Blair Revolution Revisited, (2nd ed), Politicos, 2002, ISBN 978-1842750391
- (contrib.) The City in Europe and the World, European Research Forum at London Metropolitan University, 2006 ISBN 978-0954744816
- The Third Man: Life at the Heart of New Labour Harper Press, 2010 ISBN 978-0007395286

=== Works ===
- Mandelson, Peter (1997): Labour's next steps, Fabian Society
- Mandelson, Peter (2002): The Blair Revolution Revisited Politico's, ISBN 1-84275-039-9
- Mandelson, Peter (2010). The Third Man: Life at the Heart of New Labour. HarperPress. ISBN 978-0007395286.

== Notes ==
Parliament of the United Kingdom
Preceded by Ted Leadbitter	Member of Parliament for Hartlepool; 1992–2004	Succeeded by Iain Wright
Political offices
Preceded by Brian Mawhinney	Minister without Portfolio; 1997–1998	Succeeded by Charles Clarke
Preceded by Margaret Beckett	Secretary of State for Trade and Industry; 1998	Succeeded by Stephen Byers
Preceded by Mo Mowlam	Secretary of State for Northern Ireland; 1999–2001	Succeeded by John Reid
Preceded by Pascal Lamy	European Commissioner for Trade; 2004–2008	Succeeded by The Baroness Ashton of Upholland
Preceded by John Hutton	Secretary of State for Business, Innovation Skills; 2008–2010	Succeeded by Vince Cable
Preceded by John Prescott	First Secretary of State; 2009–2010	Succeeded by William Hague
Preceded by The Baroness Royall of Blaisdon	Lord President of the Council; 2009–2010	Succeeded by Nick Clegg
Diplomatic posts
Preceded by Karen Pierce	Ambassador of the United Kingdom to the United States; 2025	Succeeded by Sir Christian Turner
Academic offices
Preceded by Dianne Thompson	Chancellor of Manchester Metropolitan University; 2016–2024	Succeeded by Antony Jenkins
Orders of precedence in the United Kingdom
Preceded by The Lord Bates	Gentlemen; Baron Mandelson	Followed by The Lord Carter of Barnes
