= How to win an election =

British political podcast

- Genre: Politics
- Format: Talk
- Country of origin: United Kingdom
- Language: English

Cast and voices
- Hosted by: Hugo Rifkind; Matt Chorley
- Starring: Sally Morgan; Peter Mandelson (until January 2025); Daniel Finkelstein; Polly Mackenzie

Production
- Length: 45 minutes

Publication
- Original release: October 2023
- Provider: The Times
- Updates: Thursdays

Related
- Website: How To Win An Election homepage on The Times website at the Wayback Machine (archived 2025-01-16)

How To Win An Election is a weekly political analysis podcast from The Times, published since October 2023. It is hosted by The Times columnist Hugo Rifkind alongside Daniel Finkelstein who was an advisor to various leaders of the Conservative Party, Sally Morgan of the Labour Party who advised prime minister Tony Blair and the treasury and Polly Mackenzie formerly of the Liberal Democrats and the Women's Equality parties who was an advisor to Nick Clegg as leader of the Liberal Democrats in government with David Cameron of the Conservatives from 2010 to 2015. It is released on Thursdays, and partially broadcast on Times Radio, within Hugo Rifkind's daily show on Times Radio.

It was initially hosted by Matt Chorley, until he left The Times in 2024. Peter Mandelson was part of the team until January 2025 when he was appointed British Ambassador to the United States.

It was listed by The Week as one of the best political podcasts, and later one of the best podcasts overall of 2023.

== Comments from Peter Mandelson ==
In December 2023, when discussing political donations on the podcast, Mandelson said that Tony Blair's government had taken £1 million in donations from an animal rights group and later banned fox hunting.

In March 2024, when discussing how appearance mattered in politics, Mandelson said on the show that Keir Starmer "needs to shed a few pounds". Mandelson was subsequently criticised for these comments by Wes Streeting.
