= Matt Chorley =

British journalist and broadcaster (born 1982)

- Born: 25 September 1982 (age 43); Taunton, Somerset, England
- Education: Huish Episcopi Academy
- Occupations: Journalist, broadcaster
- Known for: Red Box newsletter and podcast for The Times, and weekday political shows on Times Radio (2020–2024) and BBC Radio 5 Live (2024–present)
- Spouse: Alyson Chorley
- Children: 2
- Website: https://mattchorley.com/

Matt Chorley (born 25 September 1982) is a British journalist, broadcaster and comedian. He presents an afternoon politics show on BBC Radio 5 Live. On Fridays, he presents Newsnight. He hosted a live morning politics show on Times Radio from 2020 to 2024.

After beginning his career at the Taunton Times, Chorley was a political correspondent for the Western Morning News, the Press Association, and the Independent on Sunday before becoming the political editor of MailOnline. He joined The Times in 2016. He has won awards for his political podcast and for his book.

== Early life ==
Chorley was born in 1982 at Musgrove Park Hospital in Taunton. He was brought up there on the Somerset Levels, and attended Huish Episcopi Academy; he did not study at a university.

== Career ==
=== Journalism ===
Chorley started his journalistic career reporting at the now-defunct Taunton Times, and then the Western Morning News. He moved to London in 2005 to work in the House of Commons press gallery for the Press Association.

Chorley joined The Times in 2016, where he edited the Red Box political email newsletter. He then also started presenting a podcast of the same name, also hosted by The Times, which was subsequently renamed Politics Without The Boring Bits in 2023. In October 2023, The Times launched a weekly podcast called How To Win An Election, presented by Chorley and featuring the former political strategists Peter Mandelson, Danny Finkelstein, and Polly Mackenzie as recurring guests.

In June 2020, Chorley stepped back from writing the newsletter, to present the mid-morning slot at the newly launched Times Radio from 10am to 1pm, Monday to Thursday. In May 2021, he was also given the Friday shift, taking the show to five days a week.

In May 2024, Chorley announced his departure from Times Radio, and BBC Radio 5 Live issued a press release stating he will host a weekday afternoons radio show commencing in September 2024. His new politics show launched on 2 September. The following May, he also started presenting the Friday editions of Newsnight on BBC Two.

=== Comedy ===
In parallel to his early journalistic career in Somerset, Chorley formed part of a comedy trio called Big Day Out, alongside friends Lewis Georgeson and William Kenning. When Chorley left Somerset for London in 2005, his decision was influenced by wanting to spend more time focusing on the comedy sketch group, which had already enjoyed sold-out shows in the capital. In 2007, Big Day Out took their comedy show to the Edinburgh Festival.

In 2019, Chorley toured his one-man political comedy show, This is Not Normal, around the UK. In 2022, Chorley toured another show called Who is In Charge Here? In 2024, Chorley toured his third one-man show called Poll Dancer.

He announced a fourth tour taking place in the summer and autumn of 2025 called Making a Meal of It.

=== Book ===
In 2023, Chorley published a book titled Planes, Trains and Toilet Doors: 50 Places That Changed British Politics. The book focuses on unique places outside the traditional corridors of power in Whitehall, that reportedly changed the course of British politics.

=== Awards ===
At the 2020 Society of Editors' Press Awards, Red Box won the award for 'best news podcast'. At the 2020 London Press Club, Chorley won 'digital journalist of the year' for his Red Box newsletter and podcast for The Times.

Chorley's book, Planes, Trains and Toilet Doors: 50 Places That Changed British Politics, won the award for the best 'political book by a non-parliamentarian' at the 2023 Parliamentary Book Awards, organised by the Publishers Association and the Booksellers Association.

=== Feud with Andrew Bridgen ===
Since 2018, Chorley has had a fractious relationship with Andrew Bridgen, who served as the MP for North West Leicestershire from 2010 until 2024. In November 2018, Chorley wrote that Bridgen's Conservative colleagues had described him as "spud-u-hate" and "thick as mash". It is reportedly as a result of this Times article that Bridgen refused to vote in support of Theresa May's 2018 Brexit deal at the height of the Brexit negotiations.

Chorley later regularly denounced Bridgen's struggles with the law and with parliamentary standards in his columns, and has described Bridgen among other things as a "deluded attention-seeker" and "the Conservative MP for North West Bullshitshire".

== Personal life ==
Chorley is married to Alyson, whom he met while working for the Taunton Times. The couple live in Fleet, Hampshire, and have two daughters. The family's pet Golden Retriever, Poppy, is a former guide dog.

Chorley has spoken extensively of his dislike of cats, and has even campaigned for Larry the Cat to be evicted from Downing Street.
