= The Third Man: Life at the Heart of New Labour =

2010 memoir by Peter Mandelson

- Author: Peter Mandelson
- Subject: Politics of the United Kingdom
- Publisher: Harper Press
- Publication place: United Kingdom
- English publication date: 15 July 2010
- ISBN: 978-0-00-739528-6

The Third Man: Life at the Heart of New Labour, published in July 2010, is the memoir of Peter Mandelson, former senior government minister and confidant in the New Labour governments of both Tony Blair (1997–2007) and Gordon Brown (2007–2010).

It was reported that Tony Blair was "livid" by some of the disclosures and in particular the claim in the book that he (Blair) once called Gordon Brown "mad, bad and dangerous".

In the week prior to publication extracts were serialised in The Times.

== Summary ==
As an autobiography of Peter Mandelson, Mandelson's past is explored from his early days as a child and how his grandfather Herbert Morrison as a Labour politician cast a shadow over his life. After spending his early years at the University of Oxford and in Africa, he returns to the UK to find the Labour Party in shambles.

Joining Labour in his famous media role, Mandelson details Labour's electoral collapse of 1983, the gains of 1987, the disappointment of 1992, and finally the success of 1997, while managing a divided relationship between Blair and Brown. Controversy that surrounded him after he took a position was detailed, including his exit out of Britain to join as a commissioner of the European Union. Twice fired, Mandelson returns from his European role to assist Labour in the run up to the 2010 election to give his party a final fighting chance.
