= Nick Tyrone =

British journalist and novelist

- Born: 11 December 1972 (age 53); North York, Ontario, Canada
- Occupations: Journalist, novelist, writer
- Notable work: Apocalypse Delayed: Why the Left is Still in Trouble; Politics Is Murder
- Movement: Orange Book Liberalism
- Spouse: Polly Mackenzie (m. 2010)
- Children: 3

Nick Tyrone is a Canadian-British journalist, novelist and writer who publishes articles in The Spectator, the Daily Express, The Independent and New Statesman. He has written several books including Dead Idol, Apocalypse Delayed: Why the Left Is Still in Trouble, and Politics Is Murder. He has been described by Jon Rentoul in The Independent as a "waspish writer and natural troublemaker".

== Political career ==
He was the Director of Operations and Finance as well as the Treasurer of the Yes to Fairer Votes campaign that in May 2011 sought (unsuccessfully) to change the UK voting system. Tyrone later told the BBC that the campaign once considered putting out inflatable replicas of MPs' bottoms for the public to "kick".

Tyrone went on to serve as Head of Partnerships and Public Affairs for the Electoral Reform Society, from 2011 to 2014. In contrast to the aims of Yes to Fairer Votes and the Electoral Reform Society, Tyrone revealed in 2016 that he opposed replacing the First-past-the-post (FPTP) voting system for Westminster elections, believing "... FPTP is necessary".

For a period, he was the Executive Director of Centreforum, the think tank most known for the book The Orange Book: Reclaiming Liberalism which later became the Education Policy Institute. He left to join British Influence in the wake of the Brexit referendum in 2016.

From 2016 to 2019 Tyrone served as Director General of the Red Tap Initiative, which aspired to “… grasp the opportunities that Brexit will give us to cut red tape in sensible ways”.

He was a known member of the Liberal Democrats from 2008 to 2016, having subsequently written articles criticising the party.

He is currently an Associate Fellow at the think tank Bright Blue.

=== Political forecasting ===
Ahead of the 2015 General Election, Tyrone predicted that the Liberal Democrats would receive “17 percent” of the popular vote and that the vote share for the two largest parties appeared “on course for an all time low”. The two largest parties subsequently both increased their vote share, while the Liberal Democrats received 7.9%.

In 2015, Tyrone argued that fellow pro-Europeans should give their “… gratitude to Nigel Farage for hanging around the British political scene just a little bit longer” as he believed it would ensure “the pro-Europeans win”. In the 2016 United Kingdom European Union membership referendum a majority of votes were cast in favour of the UK leaving the European Union, which occurred in 2020.
