= Huish Episcopi =

Village in Somerset, England

Coordinates: 51.035°N 2.810°W

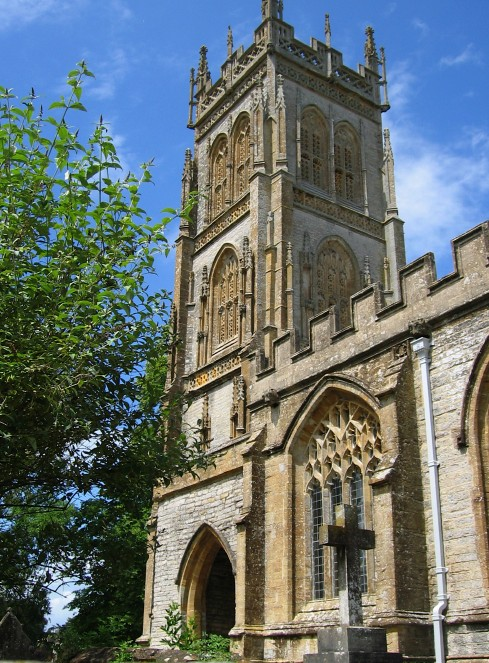
- St Mary's Church, Huish Episcopi

- Location within Somerset
- Population: 2,644 (2021)
- OS grid reference: ST432265
- Unitary authority: Somerset
- Ceremonial county: Somerset
- Region: South West
- Country: England
- Sovereign state: United Kingdom
- Post town: Langport
- Postcode district: TA10
- Dialling code: 01458
- Police: Avon and Somerset
- Fire: Devon and Somerset
- Ambulance: South Western
- UK Parliament: Glastonbury and Somerton

Huish Episcopi is a village and civil parish in Somerset, England, situated on the outskirts of Langport, 4 miles (6.4 km) south west of Somerton. The parish has a population of 2,644, and includes the hamlets of Bowdens, Combe, Pibsbury and Wearne.

== History ==
Its name derives from the lands or household ("huish" from the Old English hiwisc) and episcopi meaning belonging to the Bishop of Wells. The bishops held the manor from Saxon times until 1859 when it was sold off to tenants.

Romano-British remains, including burials, coins and tesserae dating from the 3rd and 4th centuries have been found south of Wearne.

The parish of Huish Episcopi was part of the Kingsbury Hundred.

== Governance ==
The parish council has responsibility for local issues, including setting an annual precept (local rate) to cover the council’s operating costs and producing annual accounts for public scrutiny. The parish council evaluates local planning applications and works with the local police, district council officers, and neighbourhood watch groups on matters of crime, security, and traffic. The parish council's role also includes initiating projects for the maintenance and repair of parish facilities, as well as consulting with the district council on the maintenance, repair, and improvement of highways, drainage, footpaths, public transport, and street cleaning. Conservation matters (including trees and listed buildings) and environmental issues are also the responsibility of the council.

For local government purposes, since 1 April 2023, the village comes under the unitary authority of Somerset Council. Prior to this, it was part of the non-metropolitan district of South Somerset, which was formed on 1 April 1974 under the Local Government Act 1972, having previously been part of Langport Rural District.

It is also part of the Glastonbury and Somerton county constituency represented in the House of Commons of the Parliament of the United Kingdom. It elects one Member of Parliament (MP) by the first past the post system of election.

== Geography ==
Much of the land is low lying with the rivers Yeo and Parrett meeting to the south west of the village. There were several stone quarries in the parish, particularly around Pibsbury.

== Landmarks ==
One of the most popular landmarks in Huish Episcopi is the Rose and Crown pub, which was built around 1800. The pub is described at length in The Longest Crawl by Ian Marchant.

== Economy ==
The largest employer in Huish Episcopi is the Southern Counties Fresh Foods Ltd new abattoir, which processes beef and sheep. An Abattoir Liaison Group was appointed, with members from the village, to help resolve community issues such as odours emanating from the plant, heavy goods vehicles on the narrow roads, and light pollution.

== Education ==
The village is home to Huish Episcopi School, an academy school which has places for 1,200 pupils between 11 and 18.

== Religious sites ==
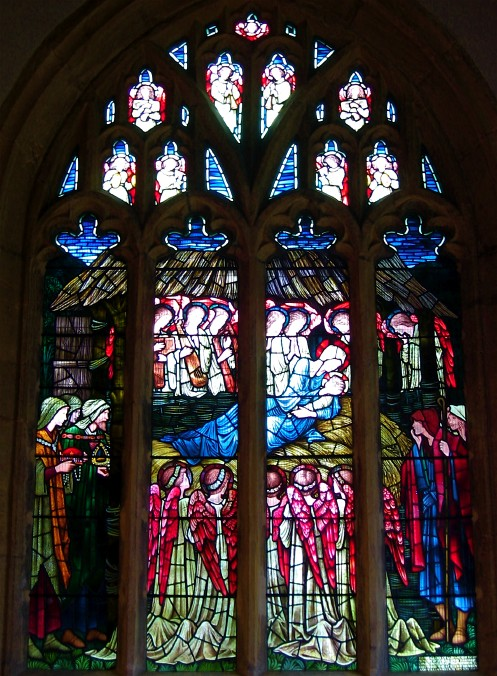
St Mary's Burne Jones window, depicting the Nativity

Huish Episcopi is home to St Mary's Church, which also serves nearby Langport. Built in blue lias with golden hamstone decoration, the church is most noted for its classic 100 feet (30 m) Somerset tower, deemed to be an architectural companion piece to St Martin's Church in Kingsbury Episcopi. St Mary's tower dates from around 1500 and was built in four stages. It is extensively embellished with pinnacles and quatrefoil panel bands. In the north-east corner is an octagonal stair turret which reaches the full height of the tower. A stained glass window by Edward Burne-Jones depicts the Nativity, other fine stained glass windows follow the life of Christ as told in the New Testament. It is a Grade I listed building.

The church appears on a Royal Mail stamp issued on 21 June 1972 as part of a set on British Architecture (Village Churches).

== Railways ==
The nearby station of Langport East, on the Reading to Taunton Line, was closed in 1962, although the line itself remains open.

== See also ==
- Huish Episcopi School
