= Huish Episcopi Academy =

Academy in Langport, Somerset, England

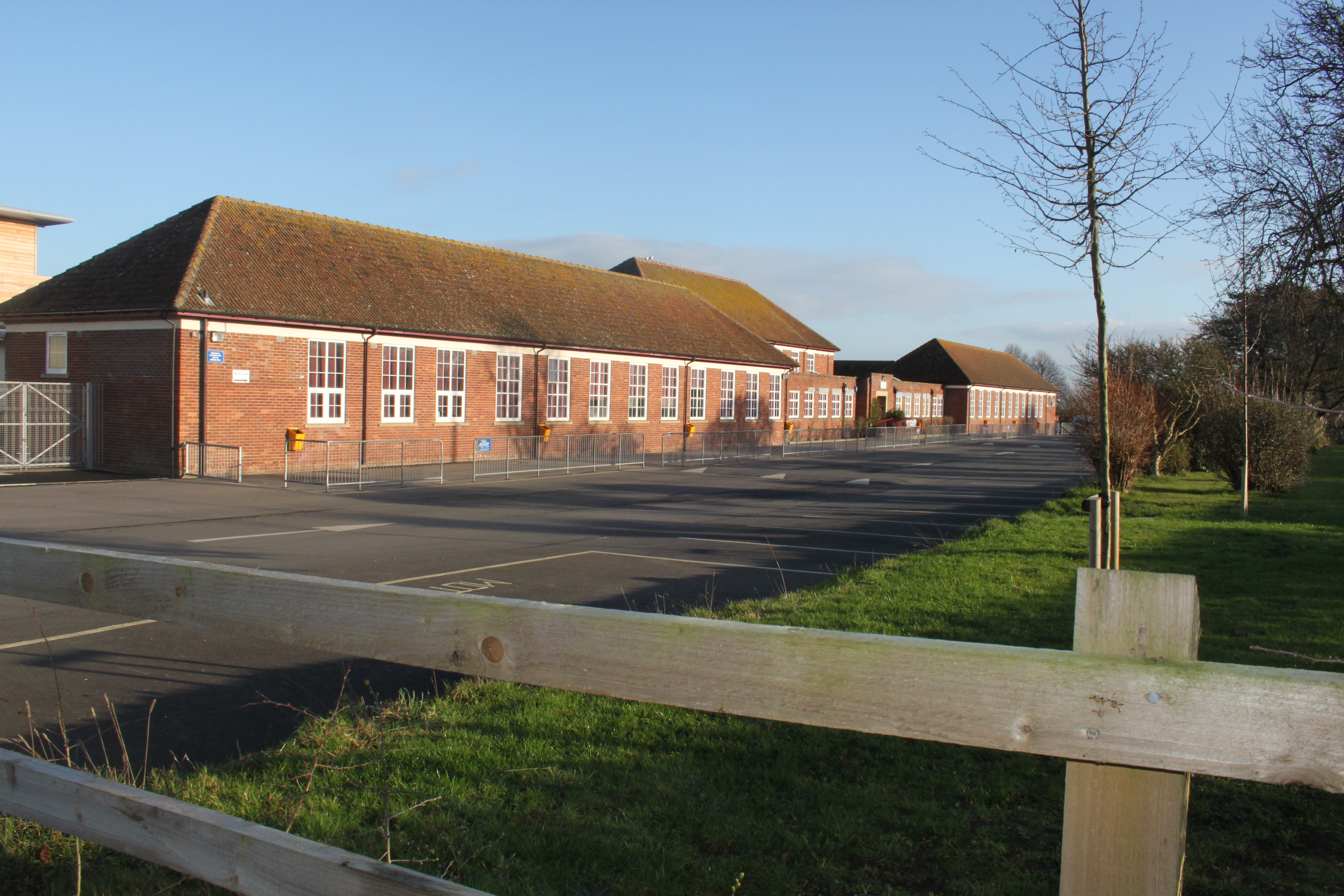

Location
- Wincanton Road; Huish Episcopi, Langport, Somerset, TA10 9SS; England; 51.0378°N 2.8177°W

Information
- Type: Academy
- Motto: Conemur ("Let Us Strive")
- Trust: United Learning
- Department for Education URN: 150038 Tables
- Ofsted: Reports
- Principal: Katie Boyes
- Gender: Coeducational
- Age: 11 to 18
- Enrolment: 1,440 as of May 2023
- Colour: Navy Blue
- Website: http://www.huishepiscopi.net/

Huish Episcopi Academy is a coeducational secondary school located in Huish Episcopi near Langport, Somerset, England.

The school has a specialist status as a Science College, Language College and Applied Learning College. In 2017 it had 1,508 students. A range of subjects are offered, including Design Technology in Food, Textiles, and Resistant Materials, Modern Foreign Languages, and Information Technology and computer science .

== History ==
The academy can be traced back to 6 December 1675 when the original grammar school was created by Will of Thomas Gillett.

The Ofsted inspection in March 2007 gave the school an overall grade of "Outstanding".

Huish Episcopi converted to academy status in September 2010.

In September 2012, the school was inspected by Ofsted and its rating was downgraded to good.

In January 2023, its Ofsted rating was downgraded to inadequate in all areas. A new temporary headteacher was appointed.

In June 2023 the school joined the United Learning group of schools.

== Notable alumni ==
- Matt Chorley (born 1982), journalist, broadcaster and comedian
