= Church of the Blessed Virgin Mary, Huish Episcopi =

Church in Somerset, England

Church of the Blessed Virgin Mary
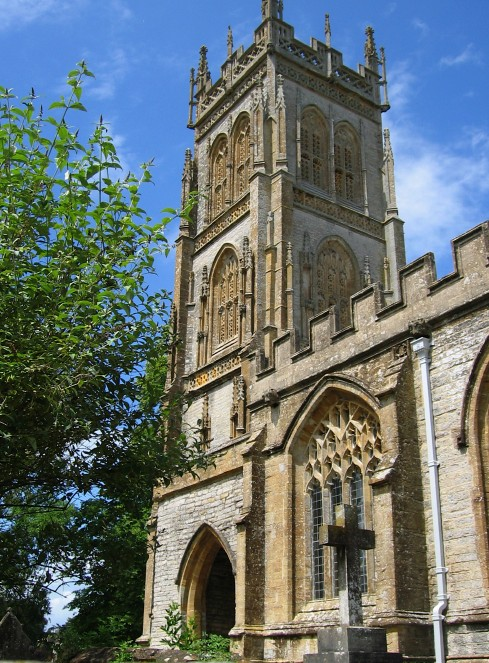

- Location within Somerset
- 51°02′10″N 2°49′06″W
- Location: Huish Episcopi, Somerset, England

History
- Built: 14th century

Listed Building – Grade I
- Official name: Church of the Blessed Virgin Mary
- Designated: 17 April 1959
- Reference no.: 1056633

The Church of the Blessed Virgin Mary in Huish Episcopi, Somerset, England, has 12th-century origins but was largely rebuilt in the 14th, 15th and 16th centuries. It has been designated as a Grade I listed building.

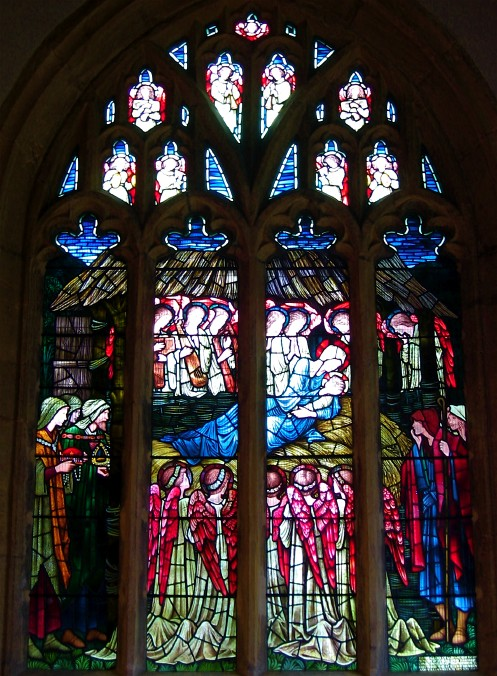
St Mary's Burne-Jones window, depicting the Nativity

St Mary's Church also serves nearby Langport. Built in blue lias with golden hamstone decoration, the church is most noted for its classic 100 feet (30 m) Somerset tower, deemed to be an architectural companion piece to St Martin's Church in Kingsbury Episcopi.

A church was present on the site during the 11th century. The current church was built after a fire in the previous structure. It was dedicated in 1232.

St Mary's tower dates from around 1500 and was built in four stages replacing an earlier central tower. It is extensively embellished with pinnacles and quatrefoil panel bands. In the north-east corner is an octagonal stair turret which reaches the full height of the tower. The tower was depicted on a postage stamp in 1972.

A stained glass window by Edward Burne-Jones is also noteworthy.

The churchyard contains two Commonwealth war graves, of a Lincolnshire Regiment soldier of World War I and a Royal Artillery soldier of World War II.

== See also ==
- List of Grade I listed buildings in South Somerset
- List of towers in Somerset
- List of ecclesiastical parishes in the Diocese of Bath and Wells
