= Polly Mackenzie =

British political and civic society worker and journalist

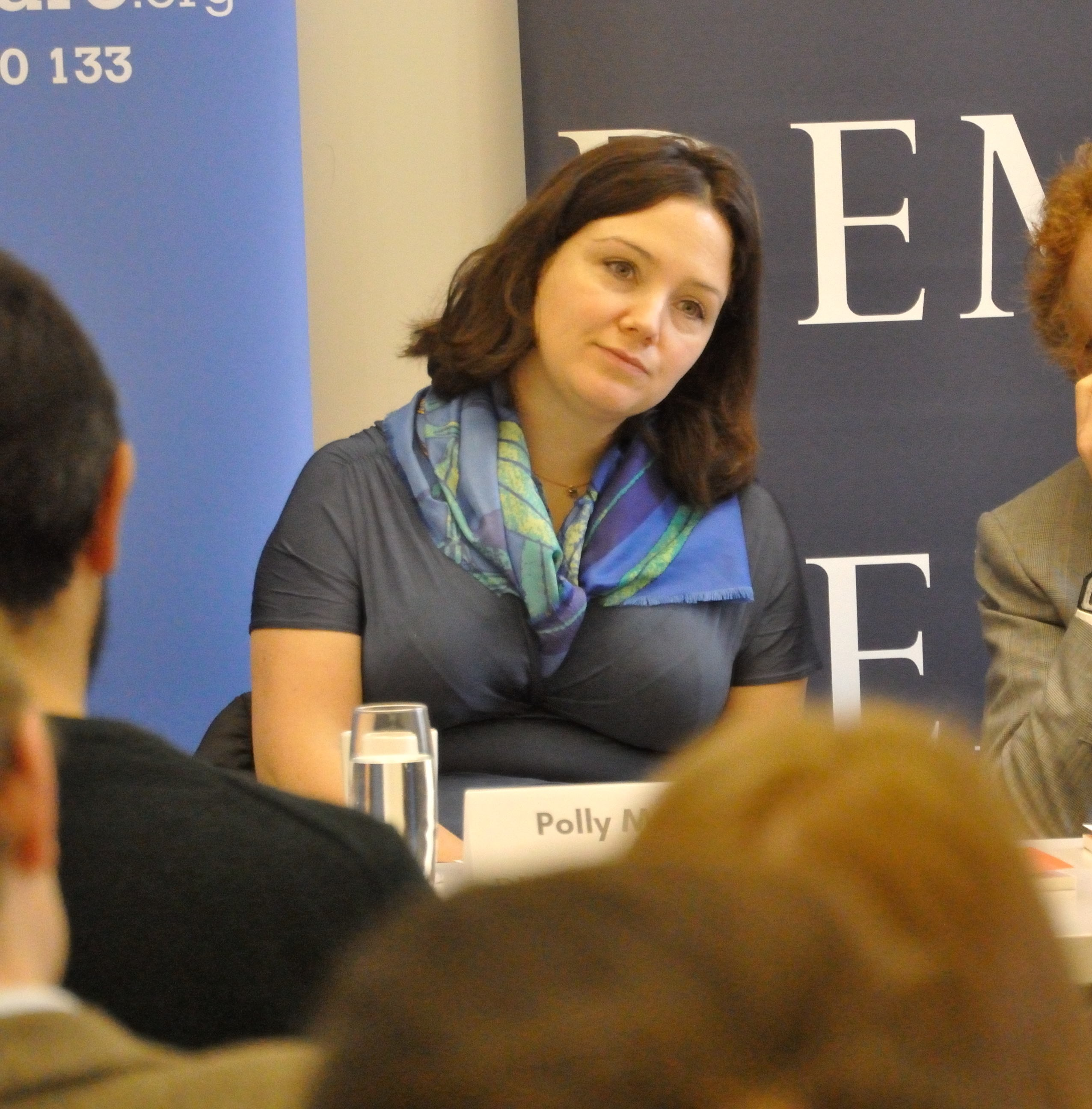
- Polly Mackenzie at a Demos Event in 2018
- Born: 8 December 1980 (age 45); Builth Wells, Wales
- Spouse: Nick Tyrone (m. 2010)
- Children: 3

Polly Janet Mackenzie (born 8 December 1980) is a British political and civic society worker and journalist, serving as the director of policy for the Deputy Prime Minister for 2010–2015. From 2022 to 2025, she had been the Chief Social Purpose Officer of the University of the Arts London.

== Early life ==
Mackenzie attended Builth Wells High School and then attended New Hall, Cambridge.

== Career ==
After graduating, Mackenzie worked as a business journalist for United Business & Media from 2002 to 2004.

Mackenzie left journalism to become a policy advisor for the Liberal Democrats, first for Ed Davey and then Nick Clegg. Following the general election in 2010 she joined Clegg, the new Deputy Prime Minister, to become a special adviser as his director of policy. She remained in post for the duration of the coalition government, until the general election in 2015.

In 2015, Mackenzie was a founding director of the Women's Equality Party. In 2016, she took on the role of found director of the think tank the Money and Mental Health Policy Institute, funded by Martin Lewis. In 2018, she moved to be chief executive of Demos, until 2022.

From 2022 to 2025, Mackenzie had served as the Chief Social Purpose Officer of the University of the Arts London.

Mackenzie is one of the participants in the weekly podcast How To Win An Election from The Times, presented by Hugo Rifkind and alongside Sally Morgan and Danny Finkelstein.

== Personal life ==
Mackenzie married the journalist and novelist Nick Tyrone in 2010, and has three children.
