= Hugo Rifkind =

British journalist (born 1977)

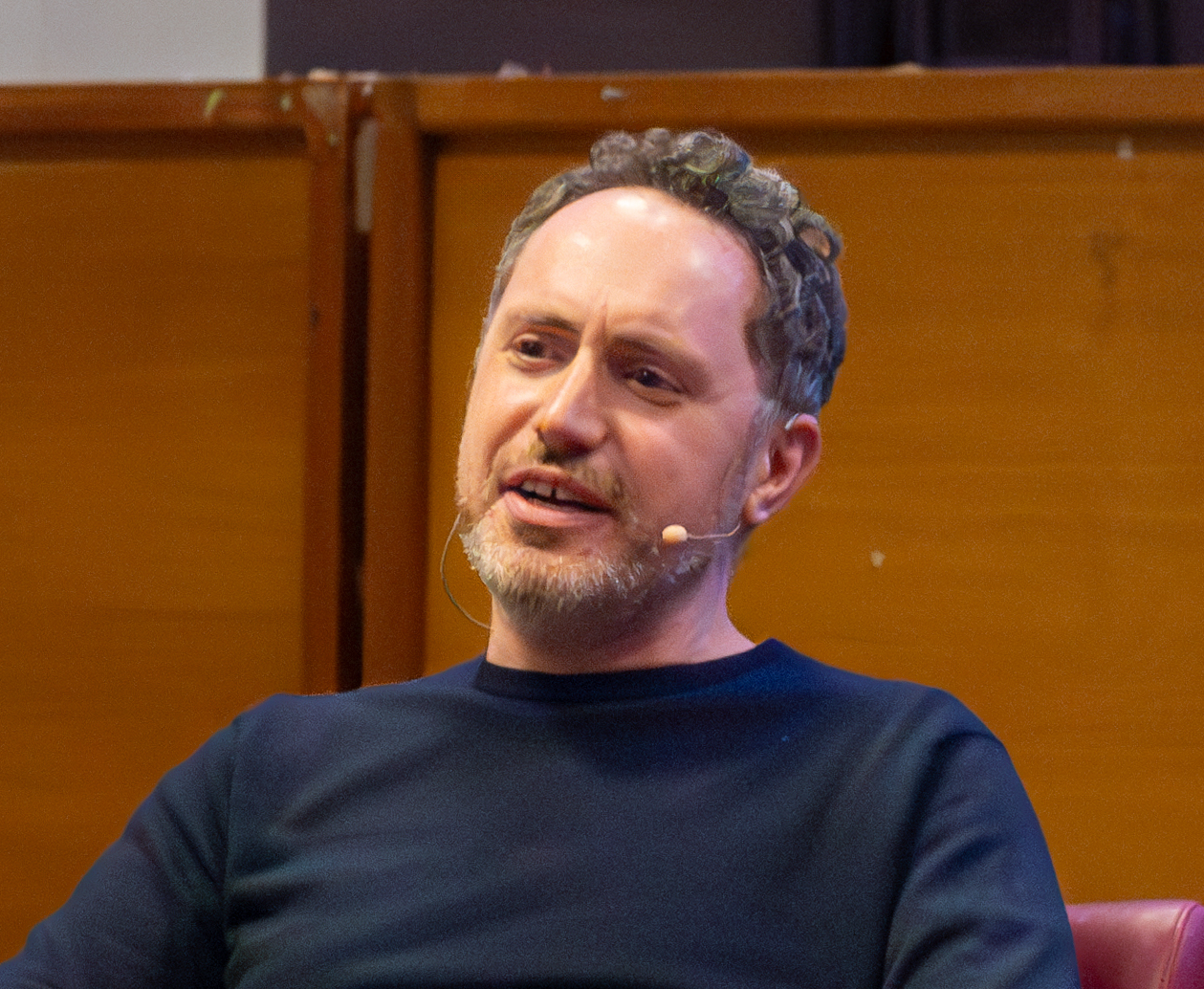
- Rifkind in 2024
- Born: Hugo James Rifkind; 1976 or 1977 (age 49–50); Edinburgh, Scotland
- Education: Loretto School; George Watson's College,
- Alma mater: Emmanuel College, Cambridge
- Occupations: Journalist; broadcaster
- Spouse: Francisca Kellett
- Children: 2
- Family: Sir Malcolm Rifkind (father)

Hugo James Rifkind (born 1976 or 1977) is a British journalist. He has been a columnist for The Times since 2005, and presents a mid-morning show on Times Radio, on Mondays to Thursdays. From July 2020 (the station's launch) to September 2024, he presented a Saturday morning programme on Times Radio. He has been a regular guest on The News Quiz on BBC Radio 4 since 2008.

== Early life and education ==
Hugo Rifkind was born in 1976 or 1977 in Edinburgh, the son of the Conservative Party politician Malcolm Rifkind (of Lithuanian-Jewish descent) and his wife Edith, daughter of Polish-Jewish airforce engineer Joseph Steinberg, who was imprisoned in Siberia after the annexation of Poland and lost his first wife and daughter.

Rifkind was educated at the private Loretto School in Musselburgh, near Edinburgh, where, he has written, he was the only Jewish pupil. He also attended George Watson's College in Edinburgh. He read philosophy at Emmanuel College, Cambridge.

== Career in journalism ==
Rifkind began his career in journalism as an editorial assistant for the show business website Peoplenews.com, before becoming a freelance writer for The Times and the Evening Standard, and a columnist for The Herald in Glasgow from 2002 to 2005. He joined The Times in 2005, taking over the gossip column ("People") from Andrew Pierce.

In The Times, Rifkind writes a Thursday opinion column, and a Saturday satirical diary ("My Week") in the style of a public figure in the news. From 2007 to 2017 he wrote a fortnightly column for The Spectator, striking a liberal, pro-European tone which ran against the magazine's conservative, Eurosceptic editorial line. Frequently his columns expressed concern about anthropogenic global warming, about which The Spectator's writers are often "sceptical". He also contributes a monthly column to GQ. Additionally, he has appeared on BBC Radio 4's satirical quiz show The News Quiz. Throughout the general election of 2015, he presented Campaign Sidebar, a Saturday morning political review show on BBC Radio 4. His debut novel, Overexposure, a satirical farce set in the London media world, was published in 2007. A compendium of his columns, My Week: The Secret Diaries Of Almost Everyone, was published in 2013. His second novel Rabbits, described by his publisher as "Iain Banks meets The Secret History in a story of drugs, aristocracy and disputed inheritance" was published in 2024.

Rifkind was named Columnist of the Year in the 2011 Editorial Intelligence Comment Awards, and Media Commentator of the Year in the same awards in 2012. He was highly commended in the Best of Humour category at the Society of Editors' Press Awards in 2012. He was Stonewall's Journalist of the Year in 2012, in recognition of his strong support for equal marriage. The same year, he was also named Best Grooming Journalist in the P&G Beauty Awards. In 2015, at the Comment Awards, he was named Arts, Culture and Entertainment Commentator of The Year. In 2017, he won both Best of Humour and Critic of the Year at the Society of Editors' Press Awards.

In 2014, Rifkind was one of 200 public figures who were signatories to a letter to The Guardian expressing their hope that Scotland would vote to remain part of the United Kingdom in September's referendum on that issue.

In a 2011 Times column, Rifkind admitted that on 23 November 2010 he had inserted fictitious information about Queen Victoria in Wikipedia's article on the date 29 April, as a prank to expose poor journalistic standards. The information was then repeated as fact by two national newspapers (the Daily Mirror and The Daily Telegraph) the following day.

In 2019, Rifkind presented a BBC Radio 4 programme titled Hugo Rifkind's Search for Power. Rifkind began presenting a programme on Saturday mornings on the digital radio station Times Radio in July 2020. In September 2024 he began presenting a Monday–Thursday mid-morning programme, also on Times Radio.

== Selected bibliography ==
=== Books ===
- Overexposure (2006) ISBN 978-1841958583
- My Week: The Secret Diaries of Almost Everyone (2013) ISBN 978-1849545518
- Rabbits (2024) ISBN 978-1788856621
