= Old Church of St Nicholas, Uphill =

Church in Somerset, England

Old Church of St Nicholas
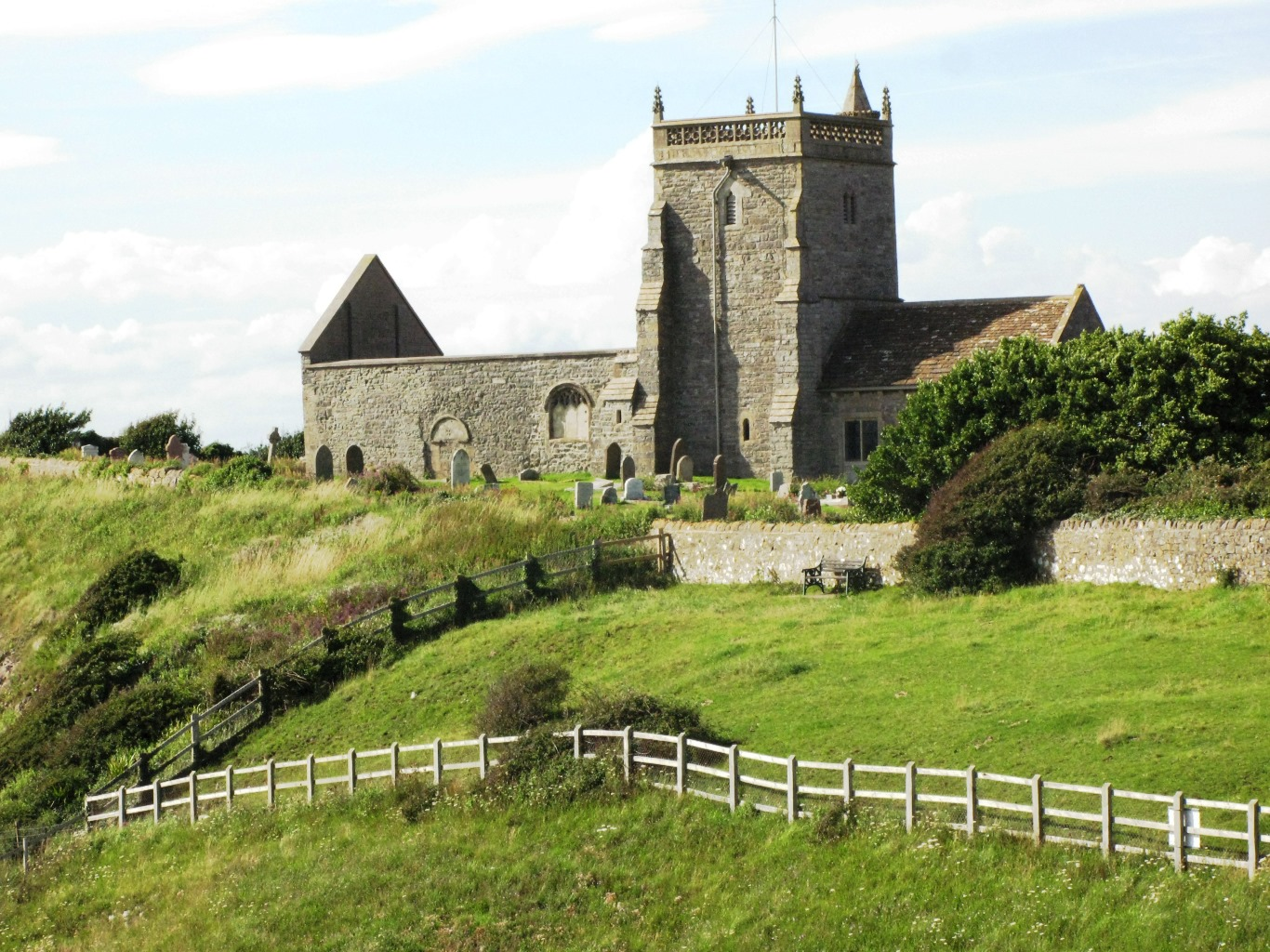

- Location within Somerset
- 51°19′13″N 2°58′56″W
- Location: Uphill, Somerset, England

History
- Built: Late 11th – 12th century

Site notes
- Architectural style: Norman
- Governing body: Churches Conservation Trust

Listed Building – Grade II*
- Official name: Old Church of Saint Nicholas
- Designated: 19 May 1983
- Reference no.: 1129743

The Old Church of St Nicholas at Uphill, Somerset, England, is described as 'Norman' but was remodelled in later Middle Ages. Regular services ceased in 1846.

The church is partially ruined but still consists of a tower, chancel and a roofless nave. It is designated Grade II* listed building and in the care of the Churches Conservation Trust, although the roofed portion is still used for services occasionally.

== Location ==
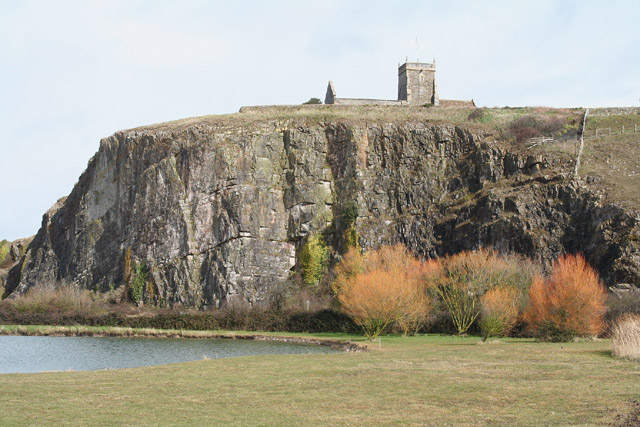
Uphill Cliff looking North East

The church overlooks Weston Bay, Brean Down and the mouth of the River Axe. The nearby masonry structure on the hill is the remains of a tower which in the late 18th century was used as a windmill but had fallen out of use by 1829.

It sits on a cliff top which. with the quarry at its western end. form the Uphill Cliff Site of Special Scientific Interest. This is notable for its species-rich calcareous grassland. It consists of grassland and rock-face situated on Carboniferous Limestone. Steeper banks and knolls in the grassland have a flora which includes orchids, Somerset Hair Grass (Koeleria vallesiana), and Honewort, (Trinia glauca) and the Goldilocks Aster (Galatella linosyris) along with several species of butterfly and Weevil (Curculionoidea).

== History ==
The church used to be the responsibility of the abbot of the monastery dedicated to St Michael, which was on Steep Holm island in the Bristol Channel.

The building was remodelled in the late Middle Ages but by 1840 was in a poor state of repair so a new church was built near Uphill Manor in 1844. Both churches were used for services until 5 April 1846 after which they were all transferred to the new church. The roof of the old church's nave was removed in 1879 as it had become dangerous. The porch was rebuilt in 1904.

In 1983 it was listed Grade II* listed building in the National Heritage List for England. It is now in the care of the Churches Conservation Trust. Occasional services are held in the still-roofed chancel of the church.

== Architecture ==
The Norman stone building has a central three-stage tower, chancel and nave. The nave no longer has a roof. There are three carved sundials, one on the east side of a plain tympanum set over a blocked door in the south wall and one to the west of the tympanum. The third sundial, on the window head on the south face of the tower, predates the Norman Conquest and may be Saxo-Norman.

== See also ==
- List of churches preserved by the Churches Conservation Trust in Southwest England
- Uphill Cliff
