= Uphill =

Village in Somerset, England

Coordinates: 51.3231°N 2.9773°W

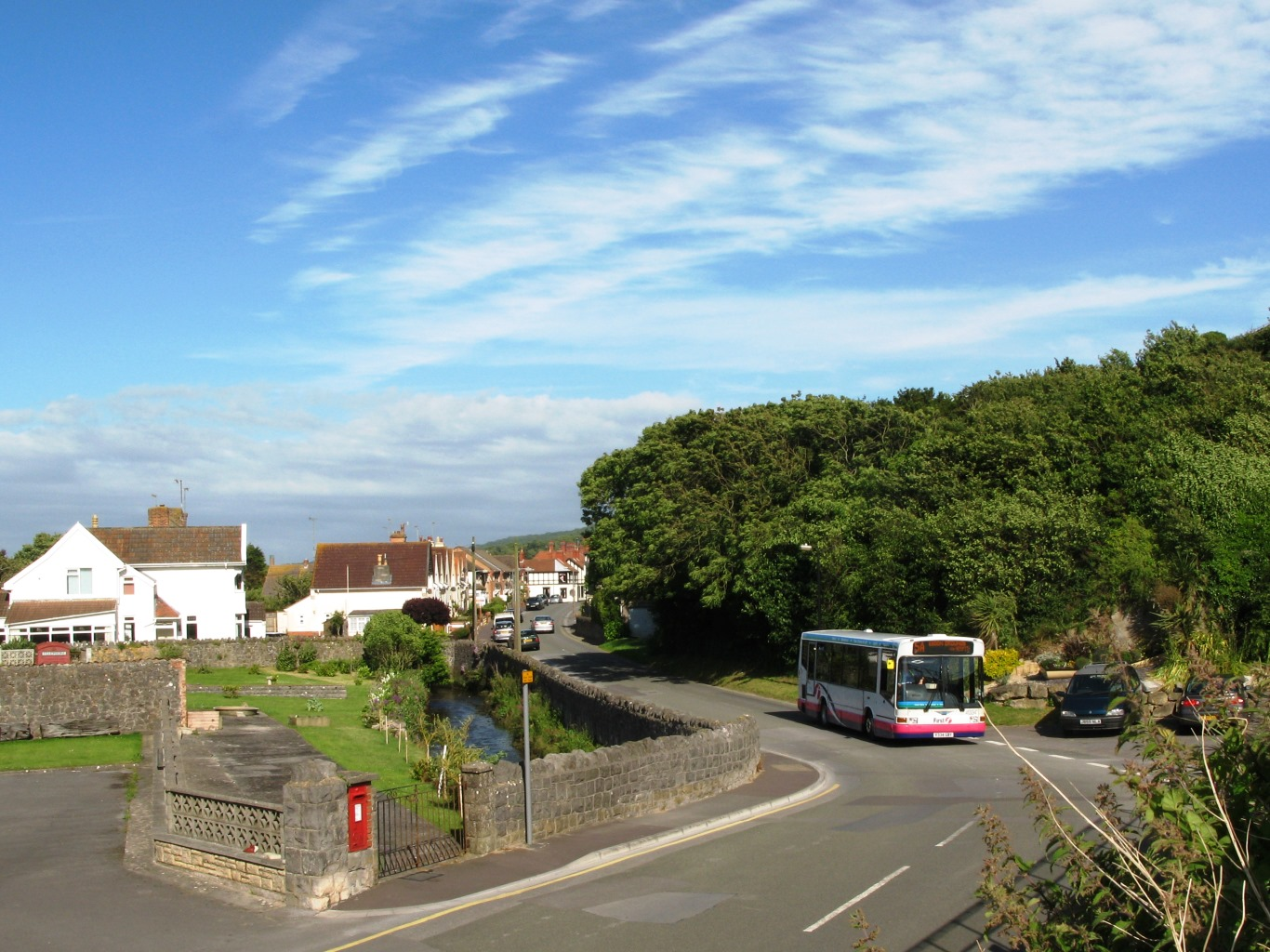

- Location within Somerset
- OS grid reference: ST31915873
- Civil parish: Weston-super-Mare
- Unitary authority: North Somerset
- Ceremonial county: Somerset
- Region: South West
- Country: England
- Sovereign state: United Kingdom
- Post town: WESTON-SUPER-MARE
- Postcode district: BS23
- Dialling code: 01934
- Police: Avon and Somerset
- Fire: Avon
- Ambulance: South Western
- UK Parliament: Weston-super-Mare

Uphill is a village and former civil parish, now in the parish of Weston-super-Mare, in the North Somerset district, in the ceremonial county of Somerset, England, at the southern edge of the town, on the Bristol Channel coast.

== History ==
Bone and stone tools found in caves at Uphill provide evidence of human activity in the Upper Palaeolithic period, and a radiocarbon date of around 28,000 Before Present, which came from a bone point, was the first scientifically derived direct date from the entire British Isles for an artefact of that period (the Aurignacian).

The River Axe enters the Bristol Channel at Uphill where it is sheltered by Brean Down and it is possible that there was a port at Uphill in Roman times but no archaeological evidence has been found for this. (Note: Crockford-Hawley (2004) surmises that while archaeological evidence has yet to prove [a port] existed, most local people are quite happy to rely on long-established hearsay! Leach (2001) does not claim that there was a port at Uphill in the Romano-British period but does write that rivers such as ... the Axe almost certainly carried their share of traffic and supported ports such as ... Cheddar or Uphill on the River Axe and makes it clear that so far there have been no recorded discoveries of the remains of Roman ships or river craft in Somerset.) (Note: The suggestion of a port at Uphill in the Roman period rests on the presumption of the existence of a road running westwards from the Charterhouse lead mines at that time. No structural remains of Romano-British date have been recorded at Uphill. The only certain evidence of activity at Uphill in the Roman period comes from stray finds of coins, as both single finds and hoards in the 19th century and all apparently from the caves in Uphill quarry – now for the most part removed (North Somerset Historic Environment Record MNS4 - An 'abridged' version of the North Somerset Historic Environment Record can be viewed on the North Somerset section of the KnowYourPlace website https://maps.bristol.gov.uk/kyp/?edition=nsom). The place-name Ad Axium, often cited as being attached to a putative Roman port at Uphill is a modern name fabricated by antiquarians in the early 19th century. This name does not apply to Uphill itself but to a site on the hillside at Bleadon about 1.3 kilometres (0.81 mi) to the south-east which modern archaeologists do consider to be probably of Romano-British date (North Somerset Historic Environment Record MNS25). The site is correctly marked on the respective First Editions of the Ordnance Survey's 25-inch and 6-inch maps. 25-inch: Somerset Sheet 16.8, surveyed 1885, published 1887; 6-inch: Somerset Sheet 16 North-East, surveyed 1885, published 1886 (the 25-inch map can be viewed on the North Somerset section of the KnowYourPlace website). Numerous attempts have been made to trace a continuous, unbroken route from Charterhouse to Uphill but have all ended in failure. Scepticism about the existence of this road has been expressed since at least the early 20th century, most notably by the leading scholar of Roman Britain at that time, Francis Haverfield. In his survey of Roman Somerset for the Victoria County History (1906) he found no vestiges, even in ploughed fields and woods, that indicate a Roman road (see pages 350 (for the road) and 368 for Ad Axium and supposed building foundations at Uphill). The current edition of the Ordnance Survey's map of Roman Britain (2016) shows a route from the Roman port at Southampton (Clausentum) to Winchester and thence north-west to Charterhouse where it stops dead; it is not shown as continuing westward to Uphill (also see Evans and Richards (1984), Gough (1967), Todd (2011), Jamieson (2015) and Margary (1967))

At the time of Domesday Book (1086) the manor of Opopille was in the possession of four knights. 1 serf, 7 villeins and 4 bordars lived and worked here. Ships coming into Uphill fell under the limited jurisdiction of the Port of Bristol, however it was a free port as it did not have the customs officers to collect revenues which were present at larger ports. In 1591 the captured French ship the Gray Honde from Bayonne was brought into Uphill, however; the normal trade from the 16th century was in livestock, brought from South Wales to be fattened on the local rich grassland. During the English Civil War the port was used to bring two regiments, about 1,500 men, of the Royalist Army from South Wales before the Battle of Langport. It continued as a small landing stage for many centuries including the import of coal and iron and the export of local produce. After the Enclosure Act of 1813 a public wharf was constructed for trade and was also used occasionally by passenger excursion ships.

In the late eighteenth century visitors started to come to the area for health reasons. The philanthropist Hannah More convalesced at Uphill in 1773 and a few years later Jane Biss was advertising summer accommodation in the village while the landlord of the Ship Inn had a bathing machine for hire. A 'Sea Bathing infirmary' was in operation from 1826 for a short while.

The Bristol to Exeter railway line runs through a deep cutting between Uphill and nearby Bleadon. This cutting is spanned by a high brick bridge known as "Devil's Bridge" and designed by Isambard Kingdom Brunel. The former Bleadon and Uphill railway station served the village from 1871 until 1964.

Uphill was an ancient ecclesiastical parish, and had almost certainly been established as such before the Norman Conquest. It was a member of Winterstoke Hundred, again from probably before 1066. It became a civil parish in 1866, but on 1 April 1933 the civil parish was abolished and absorbed into Weston-super-Mare. In 1931 the parish had a population of 839.

== Geography ==
The manor is recorded in Domesday Book as Opopille which derives from the Old English Uppan Pylle meaning "above the creek". The Pill is a tidal creek which joins the River Axe near where the river flows into Weston Bay to the north of Brean Down. The Pill is connected to the Great Uphill Rhyne which drains the moors to the east of the village.

The village is dominated on its southern side by a large hill, the southern slope of which and the quarry at its western end form the Uphill Cliff Site of Special Scientific Interest, notable for its species-rich calcareous grassland. It consists of species-rich calcareous grassland and rock-face situated on Carboniferous Limestone. Steeper banks and knolls in the grassland have a flora which includes orchids, Somerset Hair Grass (Koeleria vallesiana), and Honewort (Trinia glauca), and the Goldilocks Aster (Galatella linosyris) along with several species of butterfly and Weevil (Curculionoidea). The hill and Walborough common, which are adjacent to each other, are local nature reserves making a total area of 38.14 hectares (94.2 acres). There are a range of flowers including cowslip, primrose and green-winged orchid. The Salt marsh has sea barley, slender hare's-ear and sea clover and limestone grassland with Somerset hair-grass, honewort, green-winged and early purple orchids. These attract redshank, dunlin, shelduck, black-tailed godwit, skylark, linnet, rock and meadow pipit.

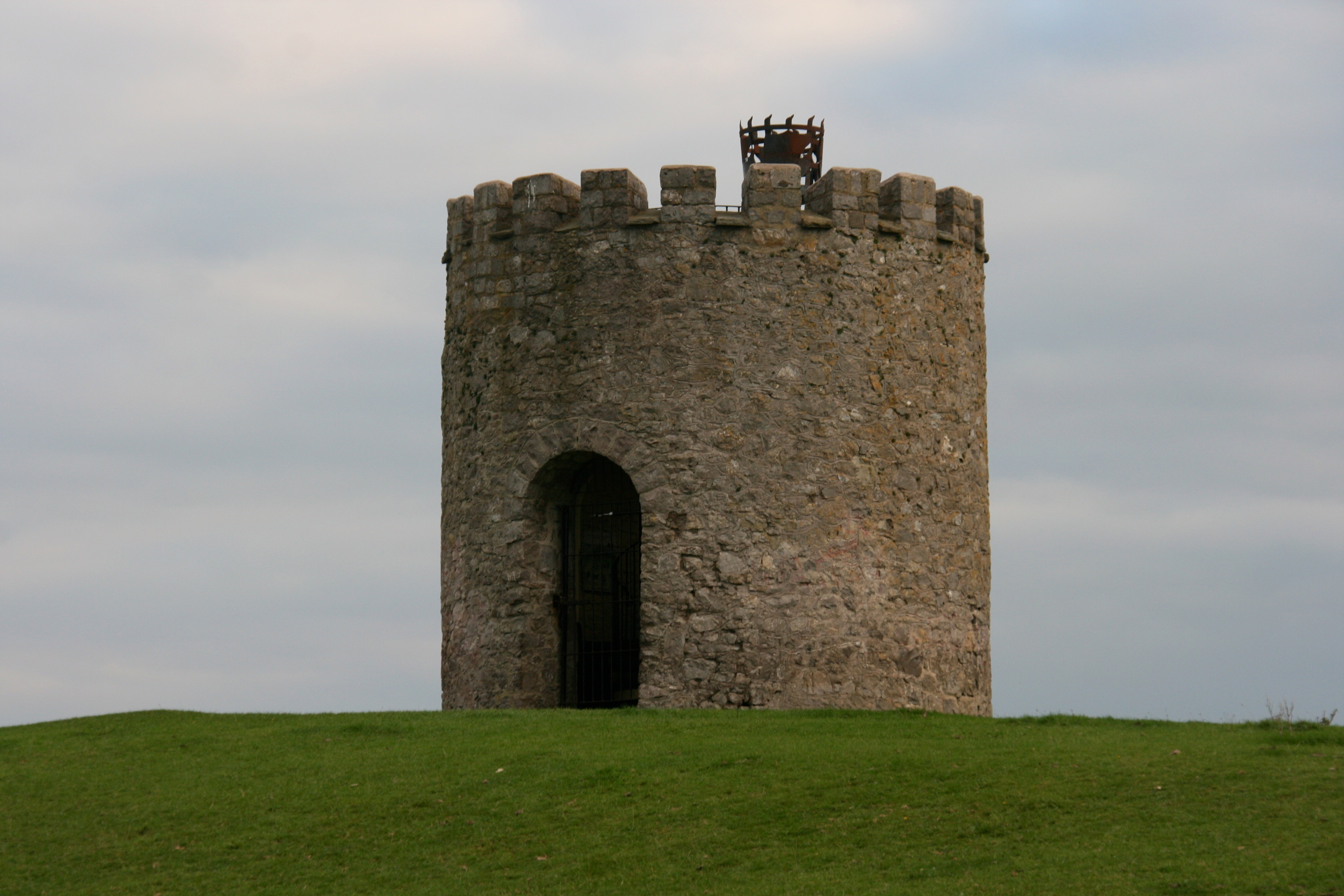
The tower on the hill

The Old Church of St Nicholas is situated on the hill and used to serve as a landmark for ships on the Bristol Channel. Also on the hill is a tower, the remains of a windmill. Although sometimes claimed to be medieval its construction date is unknown. It is most likely to be of the 18th century although map evidence suggests that it had gone out of use by 1782.

Links Road, which runs along below the hill, links the village with the beach to the west. Weston General Hospital is at the west end of the village adjacent to the A370 road. The old road to Weston-super-Mare runs northwards past Uphill Manor (which is known locally as Uphill Castle). The Mendip Way long-distance footpath has its western trailhead at Uphill near the wharf.

== Religious sites ==
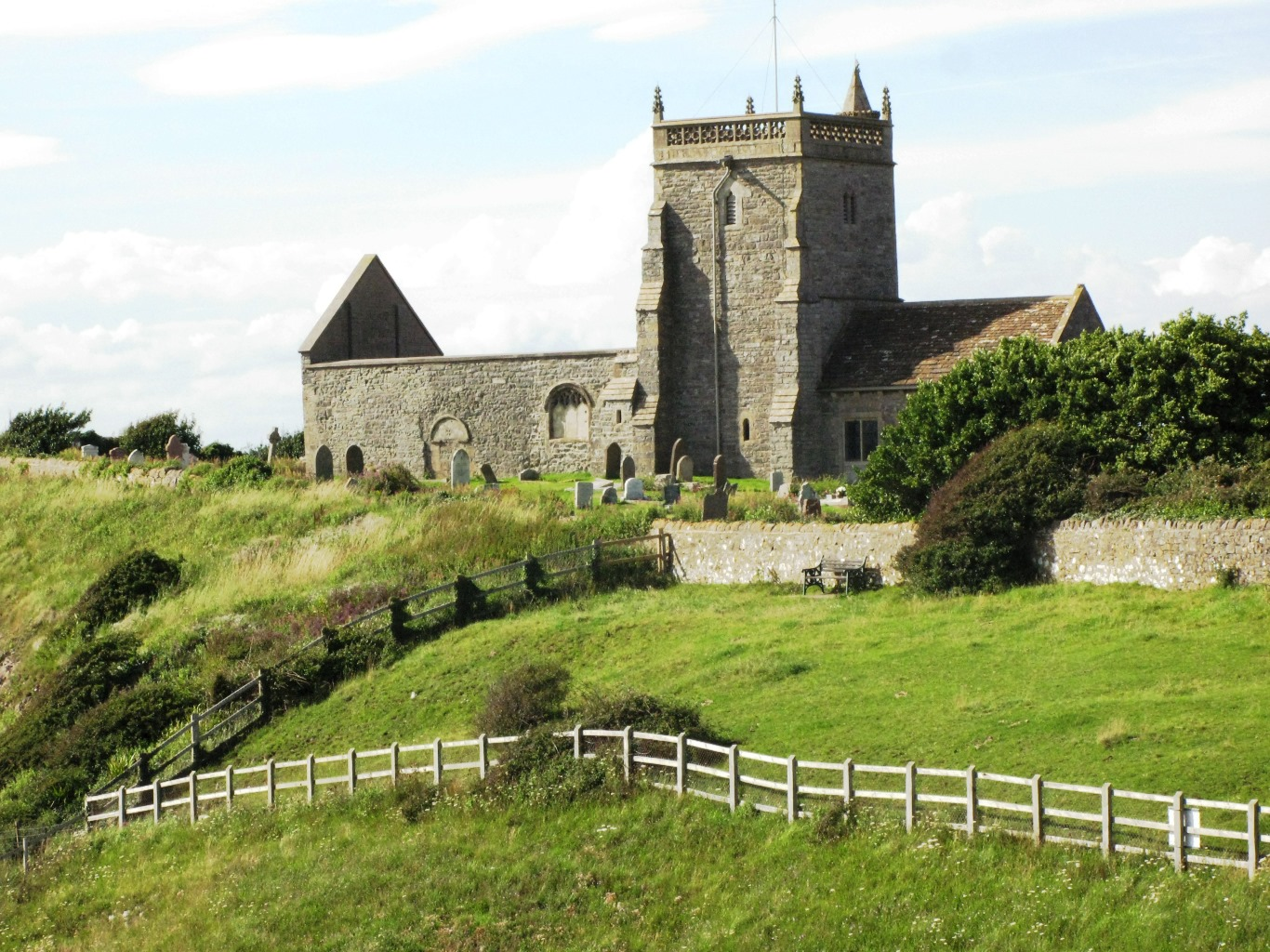
The Old Church of St Nicholas

On top of the hill stands the unroofed Norman Old Church of St Nicholas. It is now in the care of the Churches Conservation Trust.

The present day Church of St Nicholas is situated on lower ground towards the north end of the village.

In addition, a separate Methodist Church is present in the village, located on Uphill Road South.

== Public services ==
Uphill is home to Weston General Hospital. Weston Hospicecare, a hospice providing palliative care to patients from the surrounding area with terminal illnesses, is also based here.
