= Purn Hill =

Protected area in Somerset, England

- Site of Special Scientific Interest
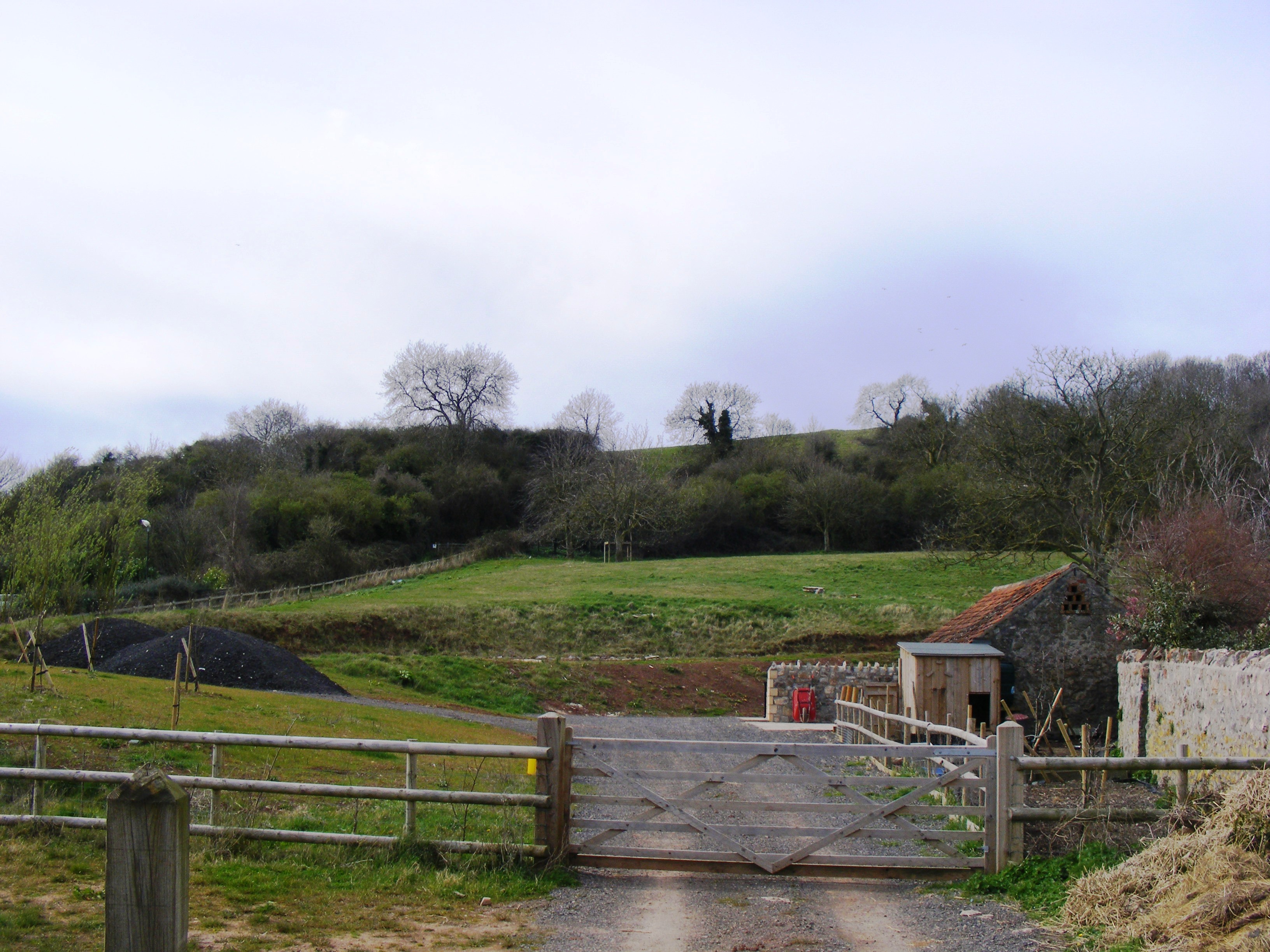

- Location within Somerset
- Location of Purn Hill.
- Area of search: Avon
- Grid reference: ST332573
- Coordinates: 51.311°N 2.959°W
- Interest: Biological
- Area: 6.1 hectares (0.061 km^{2}; 0.024 sq mi)
- Notification date: 1990

Purn Hill (grid reference ST332573) is a 6.1 hectare biological Site of Special Scientific Interest near the village of Bleadon, Somerset, notified in 1990. The site is a small promontory of Carboniferous Limestone projecting southward from the main Mendip ridge.

The SSSI citation sheet describes the site as having an "exceptionally diverse unimproved calcareous grassland flora". The richest grassland communities are situated on the thin and stony soils of the steeper west-facing flanks of the hill. Over 200 species occur in the sward, including Salad Burnet (Sanguisorba minor), Dropwort (Filipendula vulgaris), Fairy Flax (Linum catharticum), Kidney Vetch (Anthyllis vulneraria) and Dwarf Thistle (Cirsium acaule). The rare plants are mainly associated with the small exposures of dolomitic limestone in the southern part of the site. Purn Hill is one of only five British sites for the nationally rare coastal limestone umbellifer species Honewort (Trinia glauca). White Rock-rose (Helianthemum apenninum) is found at the site and hybridises with Common Rock-rose (Helianthemum nummularium) to form the hybrid H. x sulphureum. Forty species of grass occur at the site, including Somerset Hair-grass (Koeleria vallesiana) which in Britain is confined to the western Mendips. Musk Stork's-bill (Erodium moschatum) occurs here.

The Mendip Way crosses the site.

== Bibliography ==
- Myles, Sarah (2000) The Flora of the Bristol Region ISBN 1-874357-18-8

== Sources ==
- English Nature citation sheet for the site (accessed 17 July 2006)
