= Coleophora linosyridella =

Scientific classification
- Kingdom: Animalia
- Phylum: Arthropoda
- Class: Insecta
- Order: Lepidoptera
- Family: Coleophoridae
- Genus: Coleophora
- Species: C. linosyridella

Binomial name
- Coleophora linosyridella Fuchs, 1880

Synonyms
- Coleophora nicaeella Chrétien, 1908

Species of moth

Coleophora linosyridella is a moth of the family Coleophoridae. It is found from Germany to the Pyrenees and Italy and from Great Britain to Romania.

The wingspan is 11.5-13.5 mm. Adults are on wing from late June to August in one generation per year.

The larvae feed on Aster linosyris, Aster sedifolius and Aster tripolium. Mining occurs up to April.
