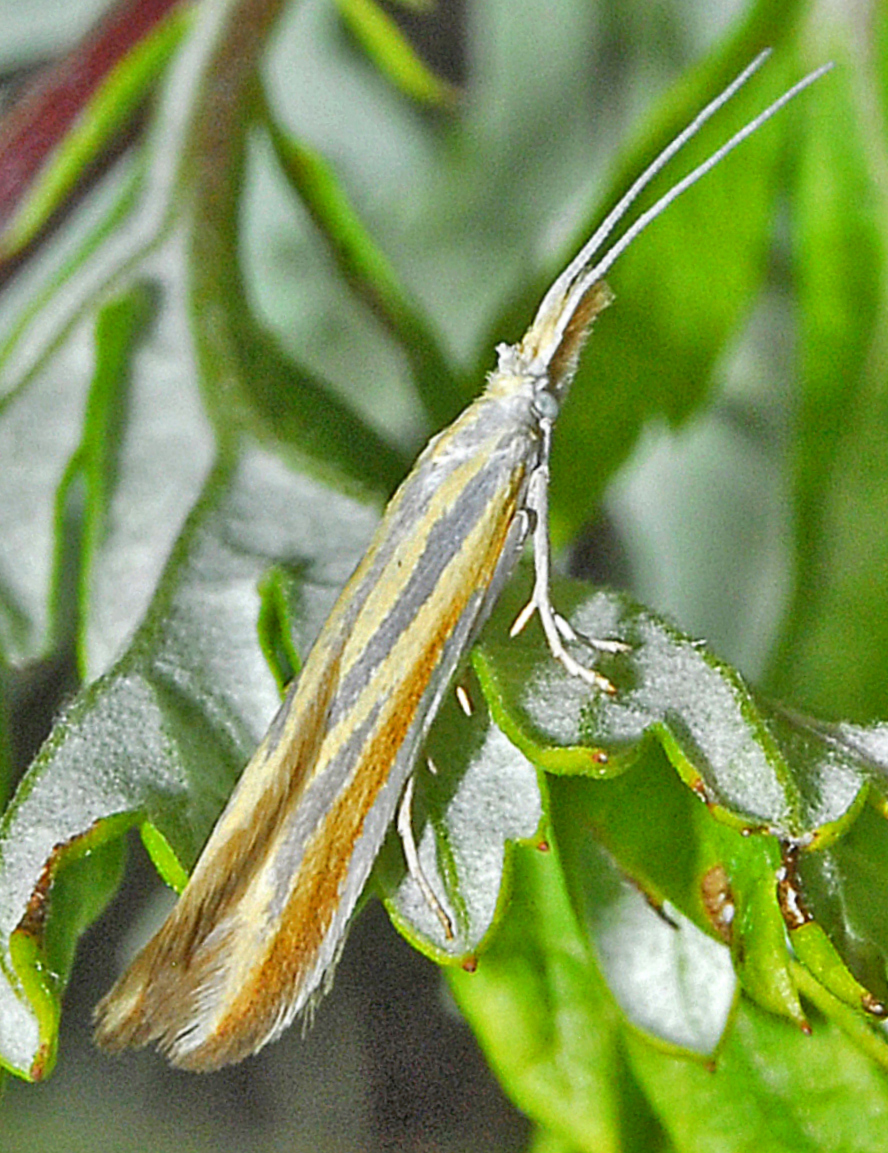
- Coleophora cf. conspicuella

Scientific classification
- Kingdom: Animalia
- Phylum: Arthropoda
- Class: Insecta
- Order: Lepidoptera
- Family: Coleophoridae
- Genus: Coleophora
- Species: C. conspicuella

Binomial name
- Coleophora conspicuella Zeller, 1849

= Coleophora conspicuella =

Species of moth

Coleophora conspicuella is a moth of the family Coleophoridae found in Asia and Europe. It was first described by Philipp Christoph Zeller in 1849.

== Distribution and habitat ==
This species can be found in all of Europe (except Ireland), in Siberia, Asia Minor, Syria, Iraq and Altai. These rather vulnerable moths mainly occur in field edges, grassy slopes and scrubland.

== Description ==
In Coleophora conspicuella the wingspan can reach 13–17.5 mm. Forewings of these moths have pale yellow ground colour, with pale streaks and white subcostal stripes, without oblique streaks to costa. Antennae are white, unringed and the scape shows a long tuft.

== Biology ==
The larvae mine leaves and feed on Aster amellus, Aster linosyris, Aster sedifolius, Aster sedifolius canus, Centaurea aspera, Centaurea jacea, Centaurea montana, Centaurea nigra, Centaurea scabiosa and Chrysanthemum species.

== Gallery ==
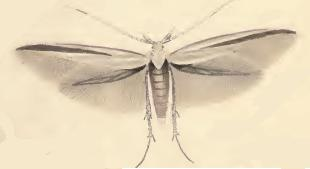
Mounted specimen

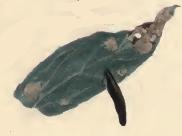
Mined piece of leaf of Centaurea nigra with a larva-case attached

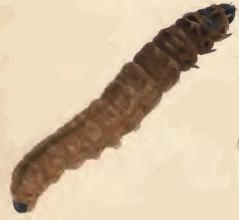
Larva
