= Uphill Cliff =

- Site of Special Scientific Interest
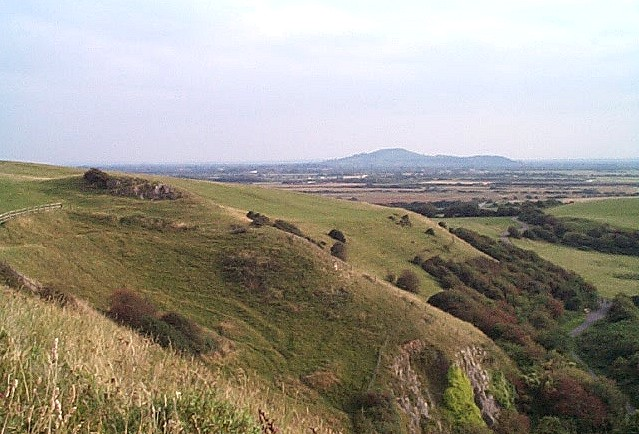

- Location within Somerset
- Location of Uphill Cliff.
- Area of search: Avon
- Grid reference: ST318583
- Coordinates: 51.31970°N 2.98004°W
- Interest: Biological
- Area: 19.8 hectares (0.198 km^{2}; 0.076 sq mi)
- Notification date: 1952

Uphill Cliff (grid reference ST318583) is a 19.8 hectare biological Site of Special Scientific Interest near the village of Uphill, North Somerset, although it is in the Avon Area of Search used by English Nature which is based on the 1974-1996 county system.

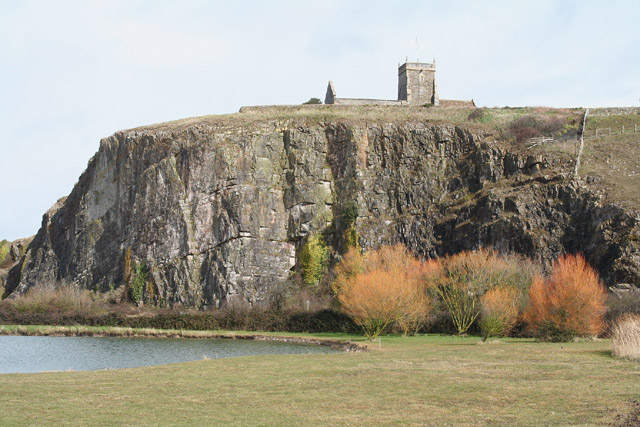
Uphill Cliff looking North East. At the top is the Old Church of St Nicholas

The site was notified as an SSSI in 1952 and the area increased in a 1984 Revision. The site excludes Uphill Church and grounds.

It consists of species-rich calcareous grassland and rock-face situated on Carboniferous Limestone. Steeper banks and knolls in the grassland have a flora which includes orchids Somerset Hair Grass (Koeleria vallesiana), and Honewort, (Trinia glauca) and the Goldilocks Aster (Galatella linosyris) along with several species of butterfly and Weevil (Curculionoidea).

The site is approximately co-terminus with two local nature reserves, Uphill Hill and Walborough Common.
