= Mark Yeo =

River in north Somerset, England

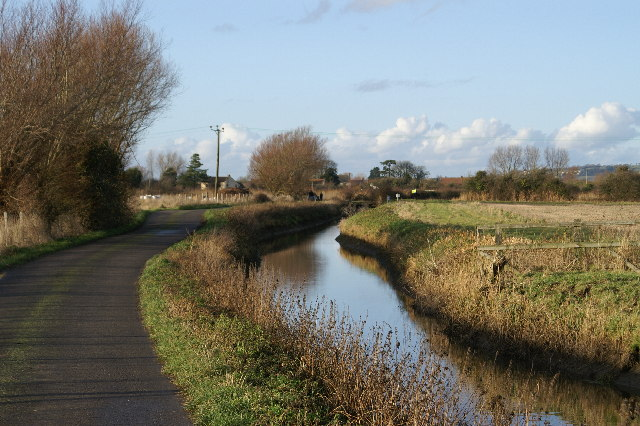

Location
- Country: England
- State: Somerset
- District: North Somerset

Physical characteristics
- Source
  - location: Mark, Somerset, England
  - coordinates: 51°14′06″N 2°53′27″W
- Mouth: River Axe
  - location: Loxton, North Somerset, Somerset, England
  - coordinates: 51°17′38″N 2°54′49″W

The Mark Yeo is a short river or rhyne in north Somerset, England. It starts near Mark on the Somerset Levels and flows north for about 6 kilometres (4 mi) under the M5 motorway to join the River Axe near Loxton. It provided a link between the Axe and the River Brue, as part of a waterway called the "Pilrow Cut" probably canalised in the early 13th century. It no longer connects to the Brue, but is used for drainage purposes, which is unlikely to have been the case in the Middle Ages. Within the village of Mark, it is crossed by an iron bridge erected in 1824, which claims to be the oldest of its kind in the county.

The river flows under the A38 road at Rooks Bridge. In the 5th and 6th centuries the Mark Yeo acted as a route from the small port of Rackley on the river Axe across the marshes to Glastonbury. It is thought to have been used to transport goods and passengers to and from Glastonbury Abbey. Excavations just north of York Farm in a field called 'Scott's Wharf' at Rooks Bridge uncovered 14th or 15th century pottery and worked stones, which represent the site of a wharf at a site where the Mark Yeo used to join the old river Axe before it was diverted.

In 2008 an oil spill threatened some of the birds and other wildlife on the river. A rescue operation was launched by local volunteers to save geese, swans and ducks who were affected. The river has substantially recovered and now has a population of fish and eels.

In 2015 a man was killed as a result of an accident in which a car overturned and was submerged in the Mark Yeo. Local roads were closed while the car was retrieved from the water. The driver of the car was later charged with causing death by driving without due care and attention while over the alcohol limit.
