= Lox (disambiguation) =

Lox is a fillet of cured salmon.

LOX is liquid oxygen.

Lox or LOX may also refer to:

== Places ==
- Lox Yeo River in Somerset, England, formerly simply known as the Lox
- River Lox in Sussex, England, a tributary of the River Arun

== Art, entertainment, and media ==
- The LOX, a rap group
- WLOX, a television station based in Biloxi, Mississippi

== Science ==
- Cre-Lox recombination a site-specific recombinase technology widely used to carry out deletions, insertions, translocations and inversions in the DNA of cells
- Lipoxygenase, a family of iron-containing enzymes that catalyse the dioxygenation of polyunsaturated fatty acids
- LOX (gene), which encodes the enzyme Lysyl oxidase in humans

== See also ==
- Locks (disambiguation)
