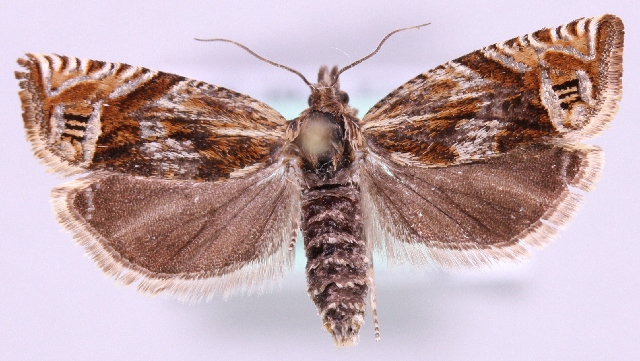

Scientific classification
- Kingdom: Animalia
- Phylum: Arthropoda
- Clade: Pancrustacea
- Class: Insecta
- Order: Lepidoptera
- Family: Tortricidae
- Genus: Eucosma
- Species: E. aspidiscana

Binomial name
- Eucosma aspidiscana (Hubner, [1814-1817])

Synonyms
- Tortrix aspidiscana Hubner, [1814-1817]; Tortrix aspidana Frolich, 1828; Phoxopteris dahlbomiana Zetterstedt, 1839; Pyralis obscurana Fabricius, 1798; Grapholitha aspidiscana var. rubescana Constant, 1895; Tortrix zachana Hubner, [1814-1817]

= Eucosma aspidiscana =

Species of moth

Eucosma aspidiscana, the golden-rod bell, is a species of moth of the family Tortricidae. It is found in China (Anhui, Henan, Shaanxi, Gansu), Mongolia, Korea, Japan, Russia, North Africa and most of Europe. The habitat consists of woodlands, downland, waste grounds and cliffs.

The wingspan is 13–20 mm. The forewings are ochreous brown, somewhat mixed with paler and darker scales tending to form longitudinal streaks in the disc. The dorsum is partly darker fuscous and the costa is posteriorly strigulated with whitish and dark fuscous. The space between the basal patch and the central fascia is obscurely greyish tinged. The three streaks from costa posteriorly and the margins of ocellus are leaden-metallic. The ocellus includes three black dashes. The hindwings are fuscous, darker terminally.

Adults are on wing from the end of April to June.

The larvae feed on Solidago, Crinitaria and Aster species. Larvae can be found from August to April.
