= Phytoecia rubropunctata =

Scientific classification
- Domain: Eukaryota
- Kingdom: Animalia
- Phylum: Arthropoda
- Class: Insecta
- Order: Coleoptera
- Suborder: Polyphaga
- Infraorder: Cucujiformia
- Family: Cerambycidae
- Genus: Phytoecia
- Species: P. rubropunctata

Binomial name
- Phytoecia rubropunctata (Goeze, 1777)

Synonyms
- Phytoecia jourdani Mulsant, 1839; Phytoecia rubro-punctata (Goeze, 1777); Leptura rubropunctata Goeze, 1777; Leptura punctata Geoffroy, 1785; Leptura punctulata Gmelin, 1790; Musaria rubropunctata (Goeze, 1777)

Species of beetle

Phytoecia rubropunctata is a species of beetle in the family Cerambycidae. It was described by Johann August Ephraim Goeze in 1777, originally under the genus Leptura. It is known from Germany, France, Spain, and Italy. It measures between 8 and 14 mm (0.31 and 0.55 in). It feeds on Trinia glauca.
