= Coleophora pseudolinosyris =

Scientific classification
- Kingdom: Animalia
- Phylum: Arthropoda
- Class: Insecta
- Order: Lepidoptera
- Family: Coleophoridae
- Genus: Coleophora
- Species: C. pseudolinosyris

Binomial name
- Coleophora pseudolinosyris Kasy, 1979

Species of moth

Coleophora pseudolinosyris is a moth of the family Coleophoridae. It is found in Italy, Slovenia, Austria, Croatia, Slovakia, Hungary, the Czech Republic, Romania and southern Russia.

The larvae feed on the flowers of Galatella sedifolia cana, Galatella punctata and Tripolium pannonicum.
