= River Axe (Bristol Channel) =

River in Somerset, England

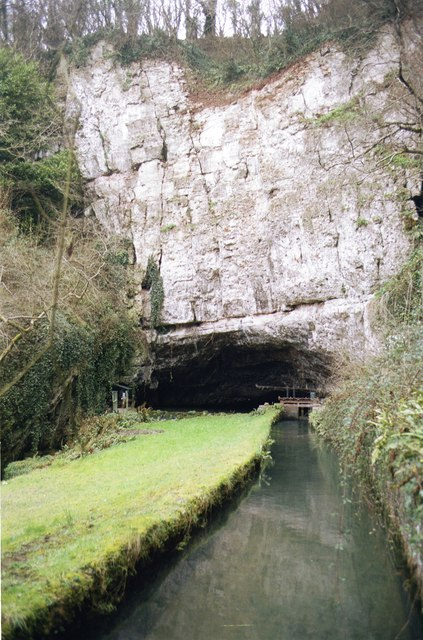
- The Axe emerging from the limestone at Wookey Hole Caves

Location
- Country: England
- County: Somerset
- District: Somerset Levels
- Cities: Wookey, Henton

Physical characteristics
- Source: Mendip Hills
  - location: Wookey Hole Caves, Mendip, Somerset, England
  - coordinates: 51°13′41″N 2°40′17″W
- Mouth: Weston Bay
  - location: Brean Down, Somerset, England
  - coordinates: 51°19′15″N 2°59′34″W

Basin features
- Tributaries
  - left: Mark Yeo
  - right: Lox Yeo River, Cheddar Yeo

The River Axe is a river in South West England. The river is formed by water entering swallets in the limestone and rises from the ground at Wookey Hole Caves in the Mendip Hills in Somerset, and runs through a V-shaped valley. The geology of the area is limestone and the water reaches Wookey Hole in a series of underground channels that have eroded through the soluble limestone. The river mouth is in Weston Bay on the Bristol Channel.

The river was navigable from the Middle Ages until 1915, during early centuries of which seeing some European trade.

== Geography ==
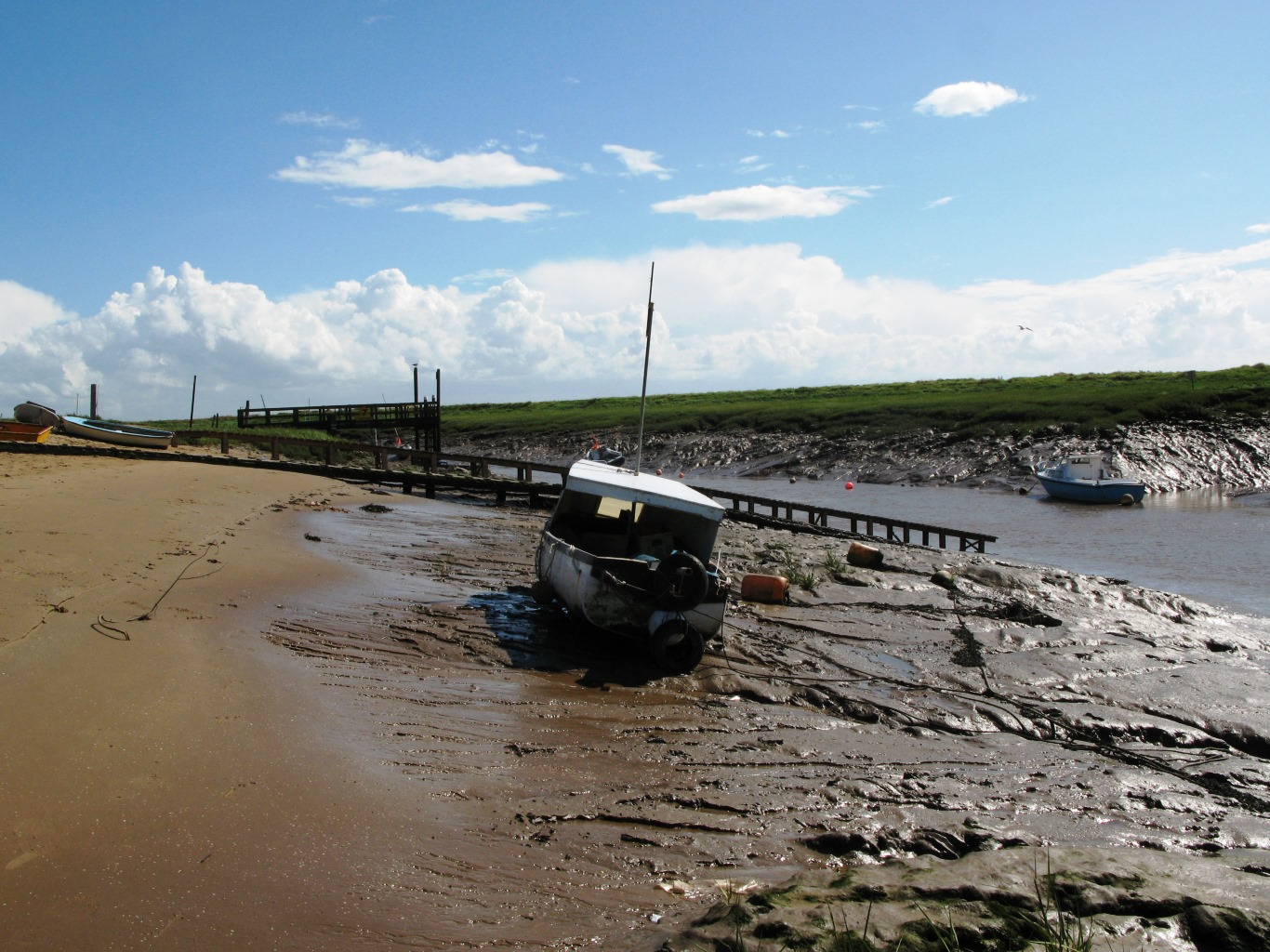
The river's estuary at Uphill

The River Axe is formed by the water entering the cave systems and flows through the third and first chambers, from which it flows to the resurgence, through two sumps 40 metres (130 ft) and 30 metres (98 ft) long, where it leaves the cave and enters the open air. It is the second largest resurgence on Mendip, with an estimated catchment area of 46.2 square kilometres (17.8 sq mi), and an average discharge of 789 litres (174 imp gal; 208 US gal) per second. Some of the water is allogenic in origin i.e. drained off non-limestone rocks, collecting as streams on the surface before sinking at or near the Lower Limestone Shale — Black Rock Limestone boundary, often through swallets. One such is Plantation Swallet near St Cuthbert's lead works, between the Hunter's Lodge Inn and Priddy Pools. It then passes through major cave systems such as Swildon's Hole, Eastwater Cavern and St Cuthbert's Swallet, around Priddy, but 95% is water that has percolated directly into the limestone.

From Wookey Hole village the river flows through a ravine and then west through the village of Wookey. There the river bifurcates: the ‘Lower River Axe’ runs more southerly, towards Henton onto Panborough Moor where it joins a series of rhynes and drains supplying water to local seasonal and perennial wetland, afterwards running north along the westernmost edge of Knowle Moor whilst the Axe proper continues west through the same moor. The two meet, to reunite, where Knowle and Panborough Moors meet.

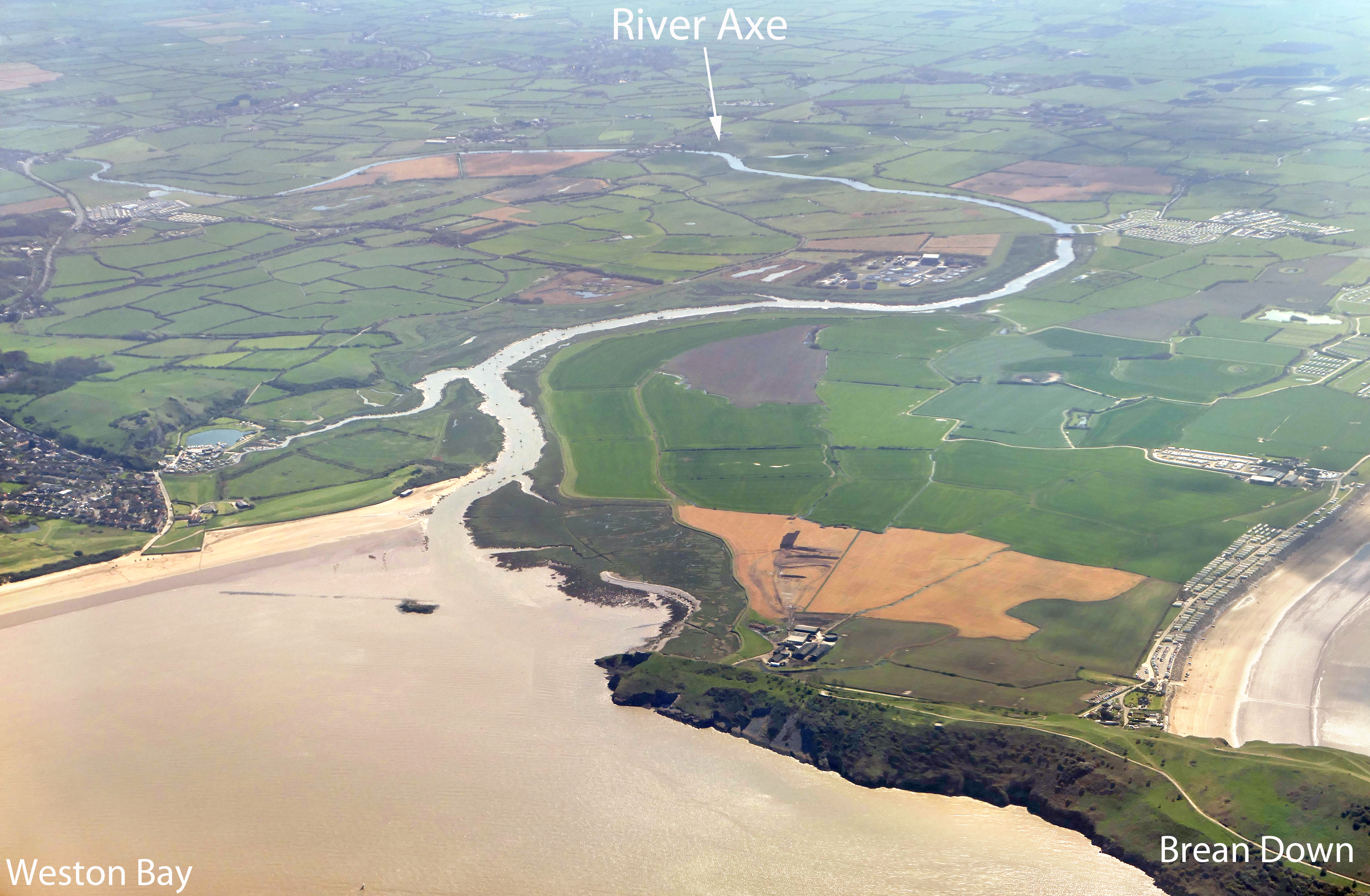
The mouth of the Axe in Weston Bay.

The river then continues northwest past Wedmore Moor and through Oxmoor, Stoke Moor and Monk Moor. The river passes through the settlement of Lower Weare and on to the south of Loxton. From this point until it passes between Uphill Cliff and Brean Down, then reaches the coast at Weston Bay, the river demarcates Sedgemoor from North Somerset.

Tributaries of the Axe include three rivers called Yeo: the Cheddar Yeo, the Mark Yeo and the Lox Yeo.

== History ==
The name derives from a Common Brittonic word meaning "abounding in fish", which is also the root for the River Axe in Lyme Bay as well as the Exe, Esk, Usk and other variants. The name is cognate with pysg (plural of pysgod), the Welsh word for fish.

The lower reaches of the Axe have a history of navigation from the harbour at Uphill through to the settlement of Weare. The current tidal limit of the Axe is the sluice gates at Bleadon and Brean Cross.

In the Middle Ages overseas trade was carried out from the port of Rackley, which is now north of the river as the course has been diverted. Rackley is now a farm below Crook Peak and west of Axbridge, which also had wharves. In the 14th century a French ship sailed up the river and by 1388 Thomas Tanner from Wells used Rackley to export cloth and corn to Portugal, and received iron and salt in exchange. Later slate was imported through this route and it may have still be possible to trade through Rackley until the Axe Drainage Act of 1915 authorising the drainage of the Axe and installation of the flood gate at Bleadon. Bleadon had been a small port, sometimes known as Lympsham Wharf, for many years, with the arrival of the railway in 1841 making this the furthest navigable point. It was last used by the ketch Democrat in 1942.

A series of 11 watermills were powered by the river but the only one which remains is at Burcott.

== See also ==
- Somerset Levels

== Bibliography ==
- Barrington, Nicholas; Stanton, William (1977). Mendip: The Complete Caves and a View of the Hills. Cheddar: Cheddar Valley Press. ISBN 0-9501459-2-0.
- Irwin, Dave (1977). Mendip Underground. A Caver's Guide. Wells: Mendip Publishing. ISBN 0-905903-08-0.
- Drew, Dave (1975). D.I. Smith (ed.). Limestone and Caves of the Mendip Hills. Newton Abbot: David & Charles. ISBN 978-0-7153-6572-4.
- Farr, Grahame (1954). Somerset Harbours. London: Christopher Johnson.
- Toulson, Shirley (1984). The Mendip Hills: A Threatened Landscape. London: Victor Gollancz. ISBN 0-575-03453-X.
- Waltham, A.C. (1997). Karst and Caves of Great Britain. Chapman & Hall. ISBN 0-412-78860-8.
- Witcombe, Richard (2009). Who was Aveline anyway?: Mendip's Cave Names Explained (2nd ed.). Priddy: Wessex Cave Club. ISBN 978-0-9500433-6-4.
