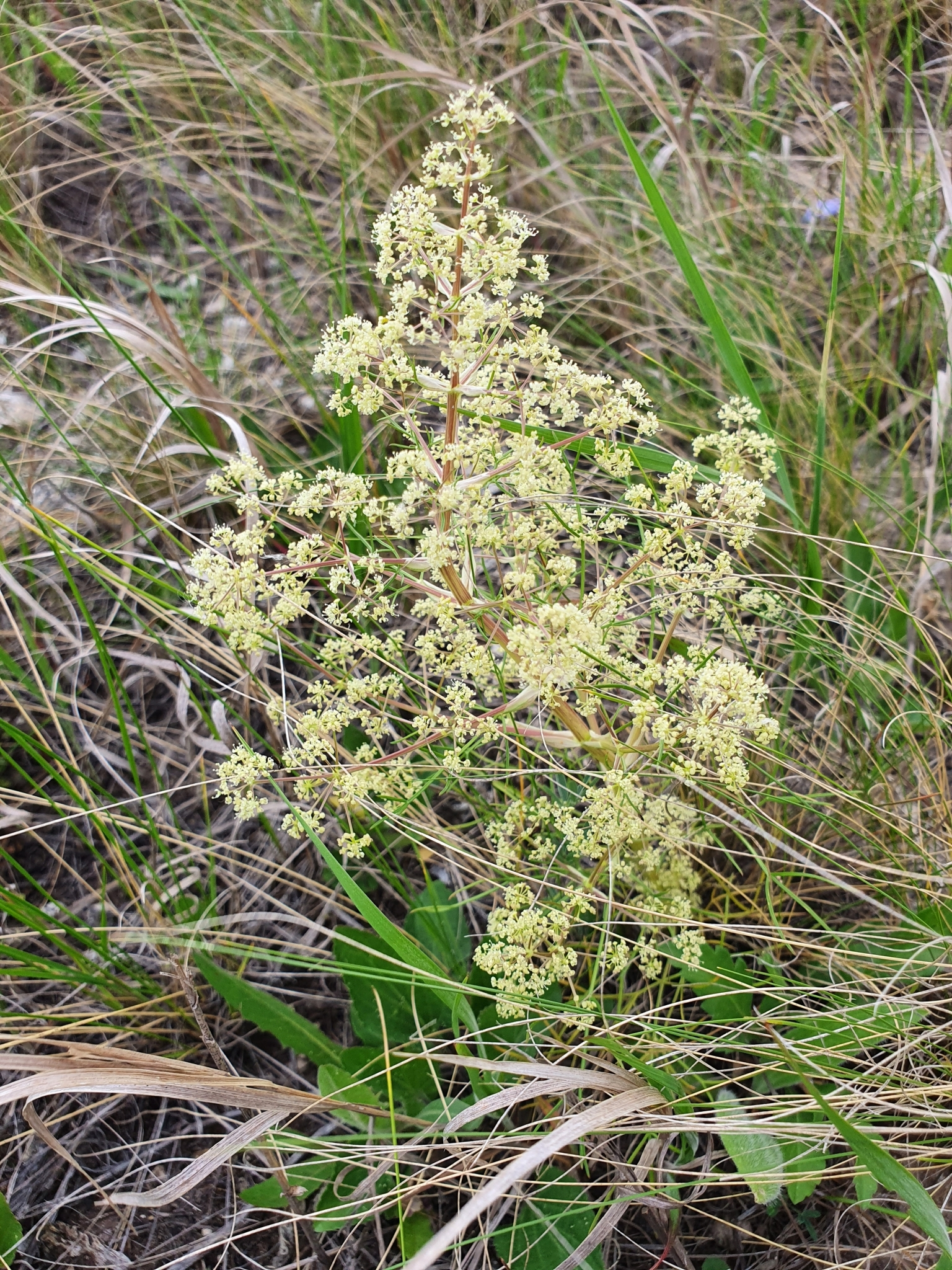
- Trinia multicaulis

Scientific classification
- Kingdom: Plantae
- Clade: Tracheophytes
- Clade: Angiosperms
- Clade: Eudicots
- Clade: Asterids
- Order: Apiales
- Family: Apiaceae
- Subfamily: Apioideae
- Tribe: Selineae
- Genus: Trinia; Hoffm., nom. cons.

Species
- See text.

Synonyms
- Lacis Dulac, nom. illeg.; Apinella Neck.; Grammopetalum C.A.Mey. ex Meinsh.; Rumia Hoffm.; Spielmannia Coss. ex Juss., not validly publ.; Triniella Calest.

= Trinia =

Genus of plants

Trinia is a genus of flowering plants in the family Apiaceae, native from Europe to Iran and western Siberia. The genus was first described by Georg Franz Hoffmann in 1814.

== Species ==
As of November 2022, Plants of the World Online accepted the following species:

- Trinia biebersteinii Fedor.
- Trinia castroviejoi Gómez Nav., Roselló, E.Laguna, P.P.Ferrer, Peris, A.Guillén,
- Trinia crithmifolia (Willd.) H.Wolff
- Trinia dalechampii (Ten.) Janch.
- Trinia esteparia Uribe-Ech.
- Trinia frigida (Boiss. & Heldr.) Drude
- Trinia glauca (L.) Dumort.
- Trinia guicciardii (Boiss. & Heldr.) Drude
- Trinia hispida Hoffm.
- Trinia kitaibelii M.Bieb.
- Trinia leiogona (C.A.Mey.) B.Fedtsch.
- Trinia multicaulis (Poir.) Schischk.
- Trinia muricata Godet
