= Cranmore Tower =

Tower in Cranmore, Somerset, England

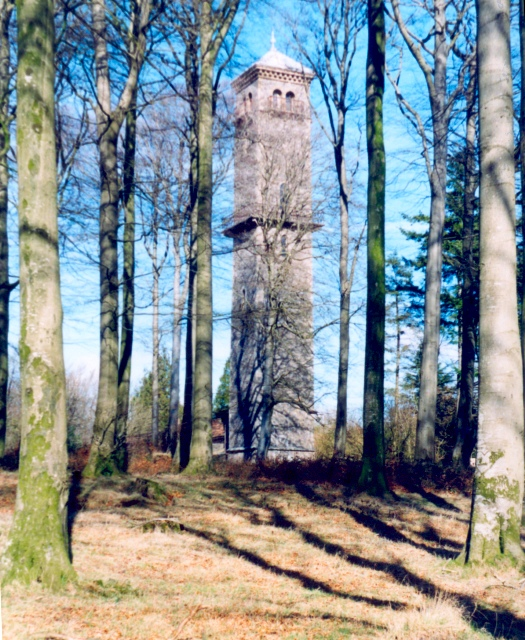

- Location within Somerset

General information
- Location: Cranmore, Somerset, England
- Coordinates: 51.2026°N 2.4662°W
- Construction started: 1862
- Completed: 1864
- Client: John Moore Paget

Technical details
- Size: 45 metres (148 ft)

Design and construction
- Architect: Henry Goodridge
- Engineer: William Witcombe

The Cranmore Tower is a 45 metres (148 ft) tall 19th century folly in the parish of Cranmore, Somerset, England. The site is 280 metres (919 ft) above sea level, and is the highest point on the Mendip Way.

The tower was built in 1862-1864, by Thomas Henry Wyatt for John Moore Paget of Cranmore Hall (now part of All Hallows Preparatory School). There is a viewing area at the top with pair of semi-circular headed openings to each face with a restored iron-railed balcony beneath each pair. A similar balcony just over halfway up is continued right round the tower. It has been designated by English Heritage as a grade II listed building.

In World War II it was used as a lookout tower by the Home Guard and the Royal Corps of Signals.

By 1984 the tower had fallen into disrepair and was sold to Donald Beaton who undertook repairs. During the course of the repairs the remains of a Roman fort with a hoard of coins was discovered adjacent to the tower. In 1988 it was sold again, this time to Nick Ridge who opened it to the public. The tower was then acquired by followers of the Baháʼí Faith. Further restorations were carried out, including the installation of a new timber staircase to allow access to the balconies at the top of the tower at a height of 320 metres (1,050 ft) above sea level. From early 2008 the tower was open to the public, in particular being marketed as a romantic setting for proposals of marriage. The tower and its grounds are is now privately owned and visitors are no longer permitted.
