= Mendip Way =

Long-distance footpath in Somerset, England

- Length: 80 km (50 mi)
- Location: Mendip Hills, Somerset, England
- Designation: Recreational Route
- Trailheads: Weston-super-Mare grid reference ST314585 to Frome grid reference ST776480
- Use: Hiking, and some sections of bridleway.
- Highest point: 280 m (920 ft)
- Lowest point: Sea level
- Difficulty: Moderate. Includes some steep climbs.
- Season: All
- Sights: Mendip Hills, Somerset Levels, Bristol Channel...
- Hazards: Adders

The Mendip Way is an 80-kilometre (50 mi) long-distance footpath across the Mendip Hills from Weston-super-Mare to Frome. It is divided into two sections.

The West Mendip Way was opened in 1979 and starts at the Bristol Channel at Uphill Cliff. It climbs the Mendip escarpment affording views over the Somerset Levels. It then crosses the central Mendip plateau leading down to Cheddar Gorge and on to Wells. Most of the western section is within the Mendip Hills Area of Outstanding Natural Beauty. From there the East Mendip Way continues through Shepton Mallet to Frome.

The Mendip Way connects with the Macmillan Way, Monarch's Way, and Samaritans Way South West. The western trailhead of the Limestone Link is within 2 kilometres (1.2 mi) of the Mendip Way near Shipham.

== Route description ==
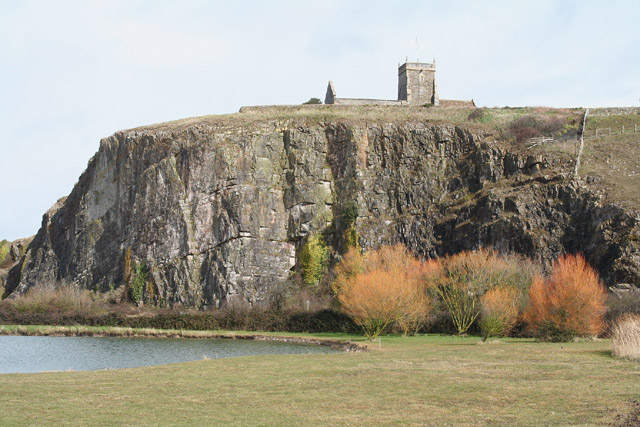
Uphill Cliffs SSSI and Norman church

The Mendip Way starts at the village of Uphill on the southern outskirt of Weston-super-Mare. The route skirts Uphill Cliff, upon which the remains of a windmill and a Norman church are located, then crossing over the Bristol to Exeter line, proceeds along the northern edge of Bleadon Level. After crossing the A370 the route skirts the village of Bleadon and starts to ascend Bleadon Hill, where it follows a minor road for a short distance. Turning south, there is a long descent to the village of Loxton where the M5 motorway is crossed.

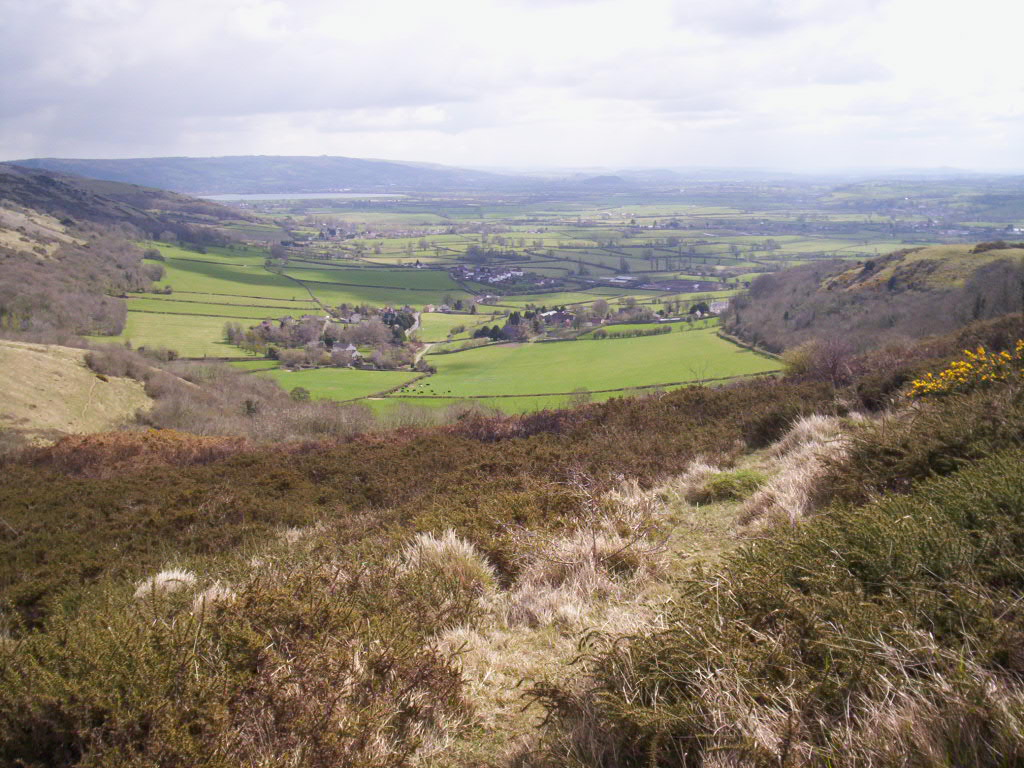
Compton Bishop showing valley setting, Mendip escarpment, Cheddar reservoir and the Somerset Levels.

A steep ascent then follows, nearly reaching the summit of Crook Peak (175 m or 574 ft elevation), but passing just 200 m (656 ft) to the north of it. Following the ridge from west to east, with the village of Compton Bishop nestled in a valley to the south, the peak of Wavering Down is reached, at an elevation of 210 m (689 ft). The route here follows the northern boundary of the Crook Peak to Shute Shelve Hill SSSI. After descending through woodland, the route crosses the Samaritans Way South West long-distance footpath which passes underneath in a tunnel of the former 'Strawberry Line' railway.

After crossing the A38, the path ascends again, heading now into the heart of the Mendips. After skirting to the south of Shipham, the path passes through the plantations on Rowberrow Warren, then joins a minor road for a short distance. Just to the south is GB Cave discovered by Francis Goddard and Charles Barker in 1939. It is one of the many caves in the Mendips. There are also several round barrows in this area.

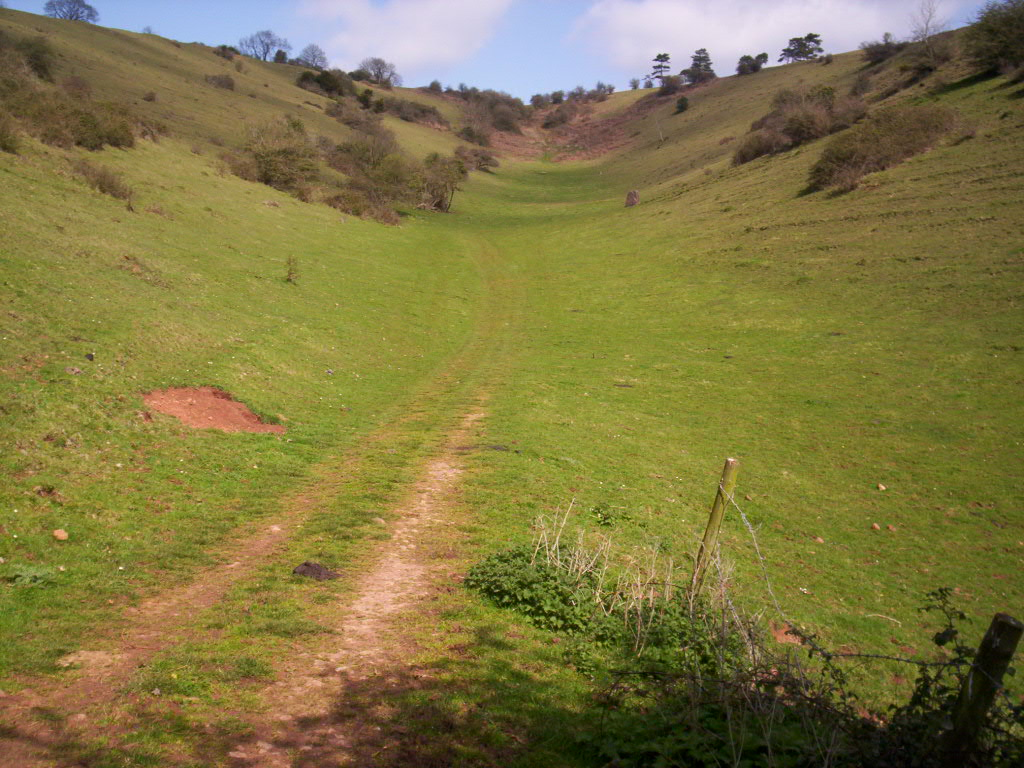
Batcombe Hollow above Draycott

Descending into a valley, the route swings to the southwest to Black Rock at the top of Cheddar Gorge. It continues in this direction, first climbing then descending the hill to the east of the gorge, before swinging back eastwards just short of reaching the village of Cheddar. The path now climbs the southern escarpment of the Mendips, before descending by way of Batcombe Hollow to Draycott.

After a short section along the A371, the route heads back up into the hills, passing close by Draycott Sleights SSSI and the airfield of the Mendip Gliding Club. At the top of the hill is the earthworks of an ancient settlement, and several more roundbarrows are passed on the way to Priddy. Priddy village green has been the site of a sheep fair since 1348, and the New Inn appeared there in 1373. Heading south from Priddy, the route passes through Ebbor Gorge National Nature Reserve, and on to Wookey Hole, famous for its cave and witch legend. The Monarch's Way long-distance footpath joins here, and shares some, but not all, of the same route on the way to Wells.

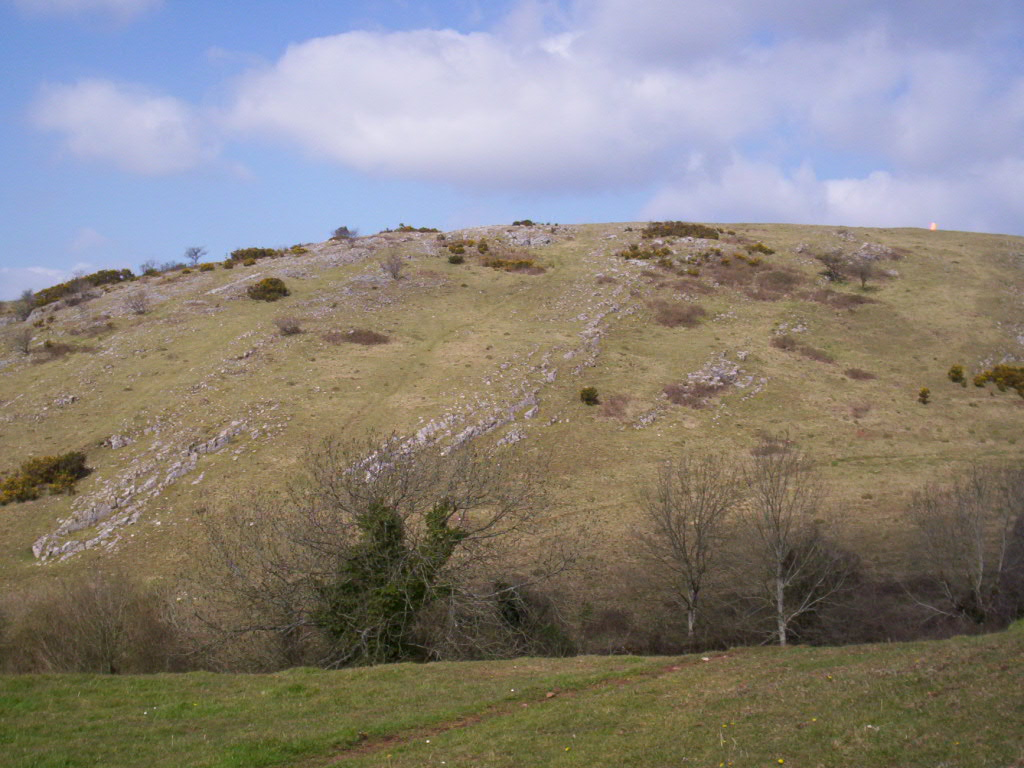
Draycott Sleights.

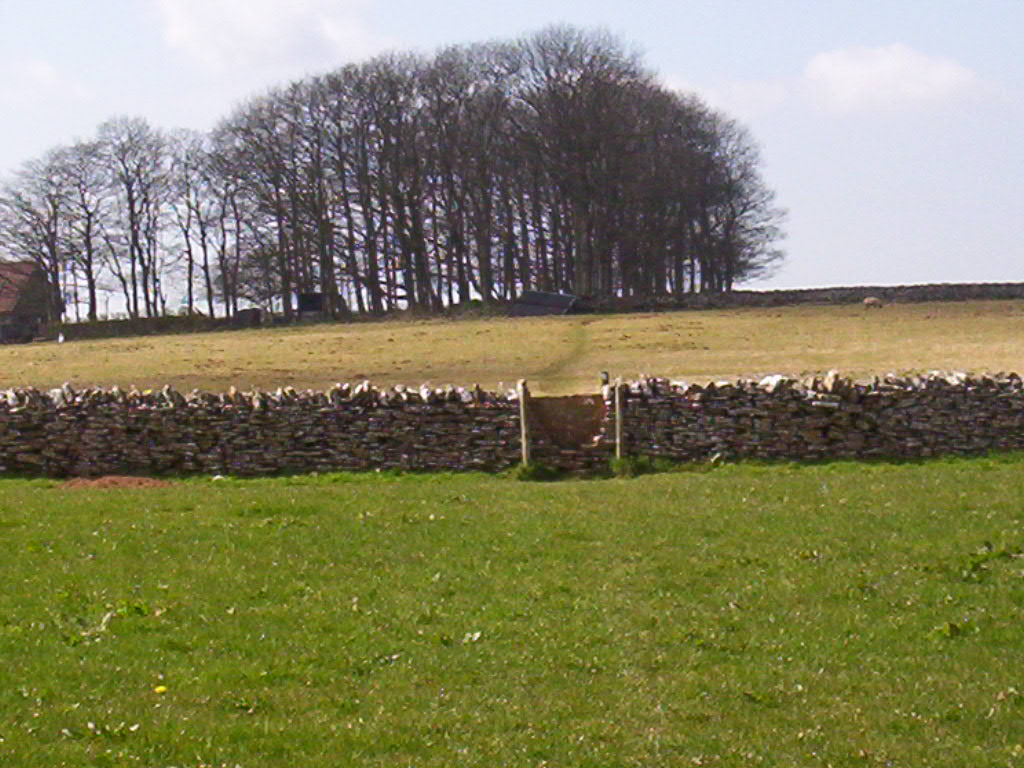
A copse in fields on the Mendips near Priddy.

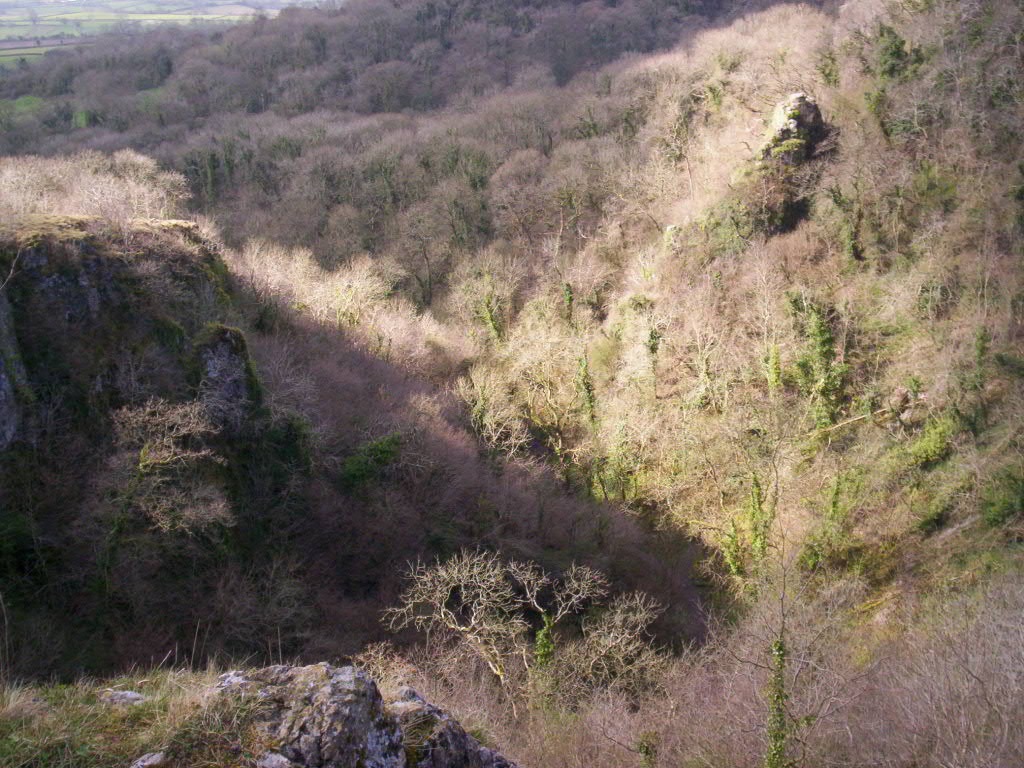
Looking down into Ebbor Gorge.

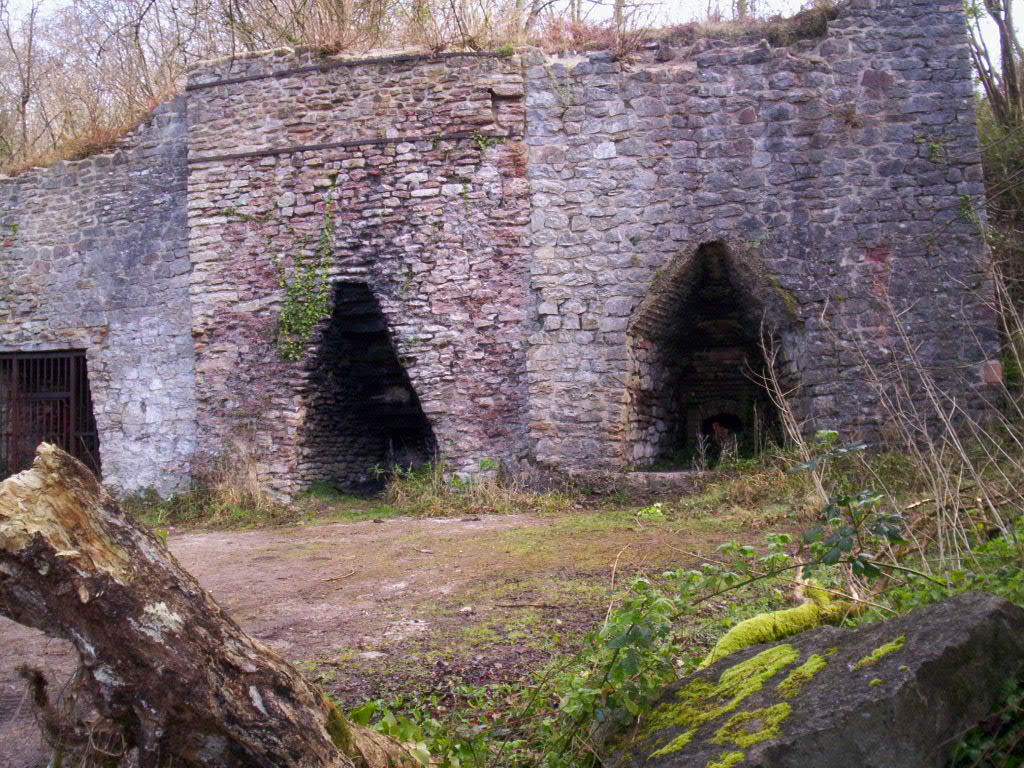
This old lime kiln near Wells is one of several to be seen along the route.

The route leaves Wells by way of the path around the Bishop's Palace moat, then enters the woods at Tor Hill, a National Trust property, and passes by the top of a disused quarry. It then joins a track which was formerly used by horse-drawn transport to avoid paying tolls on the main road. This track passes by King's Castle wood, a reserve of the Somerset Wildlife Trust and the site of an Iron Age settlement. It takes the route on to the high ground of Lyatt and Furzy Sleight. Passing high above the village of Croscombe, the path then goes through Ham Woods and turns southeast to descend towards Shepton Mallet. Approaching town, the route roughly follows the line of the now derelict Somerset and Dorset Joint Railway. The two large viaducts that carried the railway around the town are Grade II listed buildings.

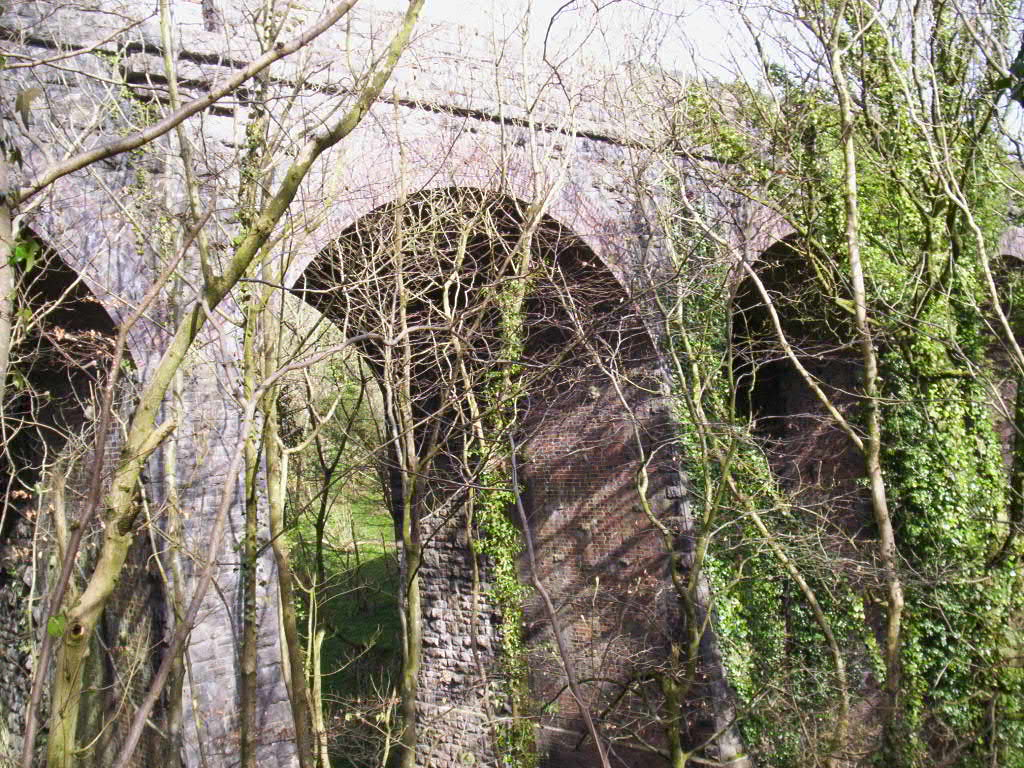
Ham Woods Viaduct

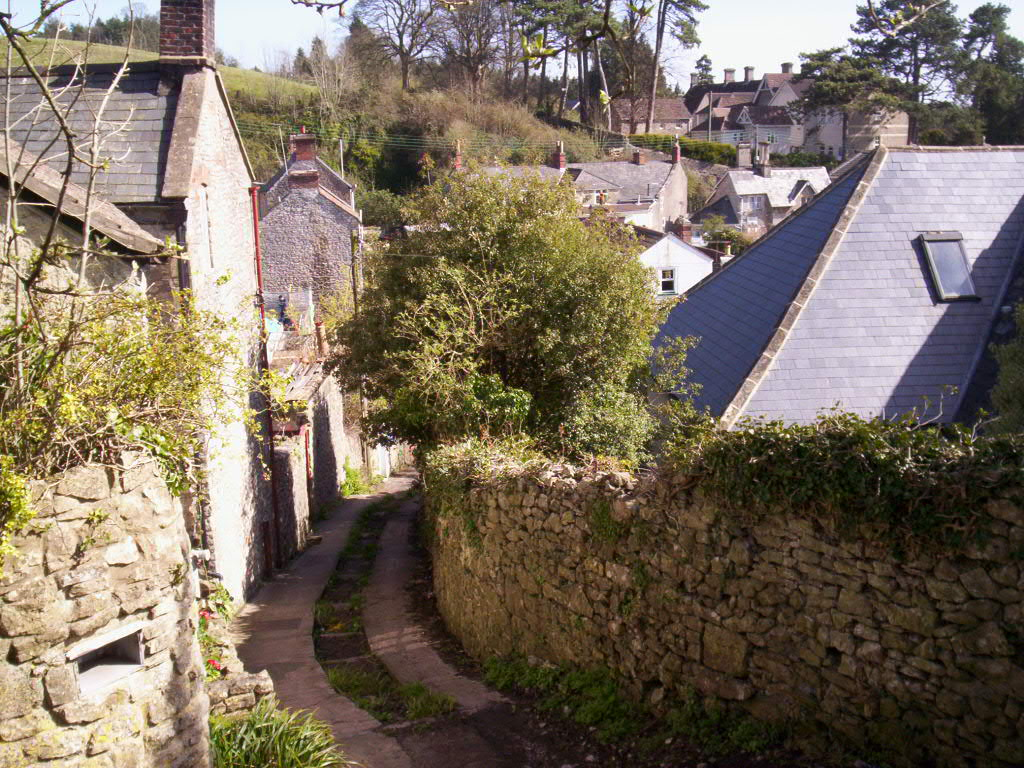
The Mendip Way passes the outskirts of Shepton Mallet via a number of alley ways.

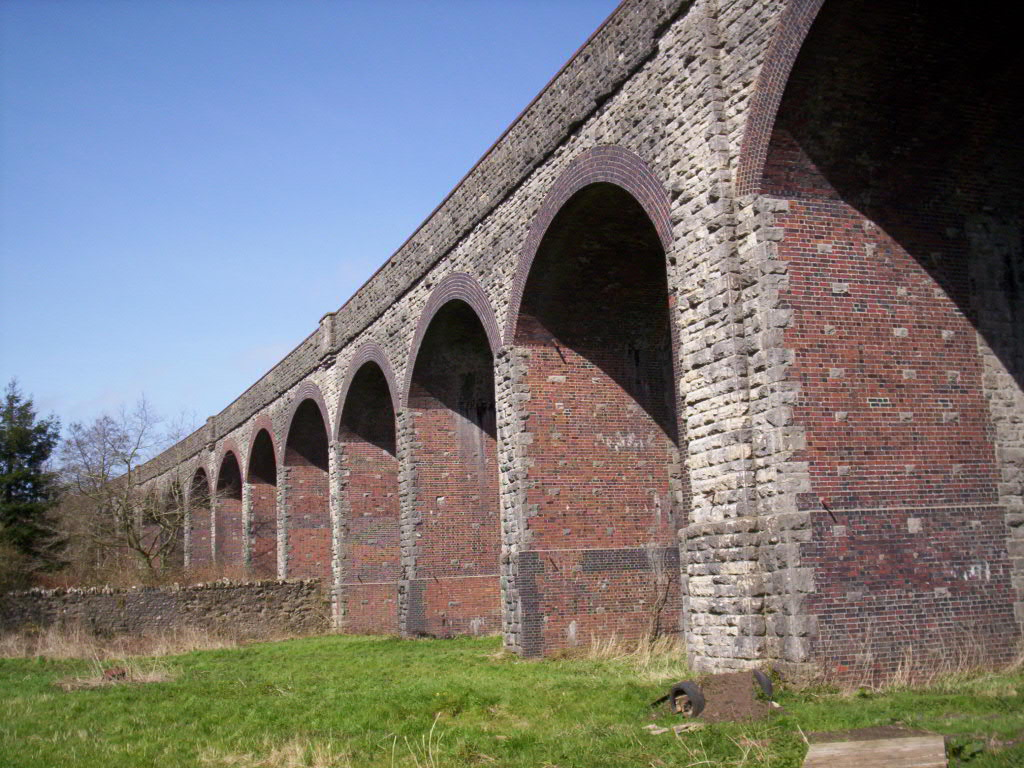
Charlton Viaduct

Leaving the town behind, the path goes over Ingsdons Hill to the hamlet of Chelynch. At Waterlip the route passes by a flooded quarry, then climbs to 280 metres (919 ft), the highest point on the Mendip Way. This is the site of Cranmore Tower, a 45-metre (148 ft) tall 19th century folly, now a grade II listed building. Asham Wood is a biological Site of Special Scientific Interest and the largest and most diverse of the ancient semi-natural woods in the Mendips. Further on, the hamlet of Chantry is one of the Thankful Villages which suffered no casualties in the First World War. The path then goes alongside Whatley Quarry which has been the subject of environmental criticism. At Forbury Bottom, the Macmillan Way shares the route for a short way until Great Elm. The path then leads into Frome where the Mendip Way terminates.

== Rail Access ==
- Weston-super-Mare railway station
- Frome railway station

== Services ==
Weston-super-Mare and Frome are served by train and coach. Buses run regularly on routes parallel to the Mendip Way, from Weston-super-Mare to Wells, and Wells to Frome. Accommodations and campsites can be found along the route. The route is covered by Ordnance Survey Explorer Maps 141, 143 and 153, and Landranger maps 182 and 183. The route is shown on recent editions of these maps.

Two publications provide more information:

- Uphill to Frome: a guide to the Mendip Way, by David Wright ISBN 0-9539237-0-3. A guide to the complete route, with maps.
- West Mendip Way by Andrew Eddy, Weston Heritage Centre. Detailed guide to the western section Uphill to Wells, with maps.

== See also ==
- Geology of the Mendips
