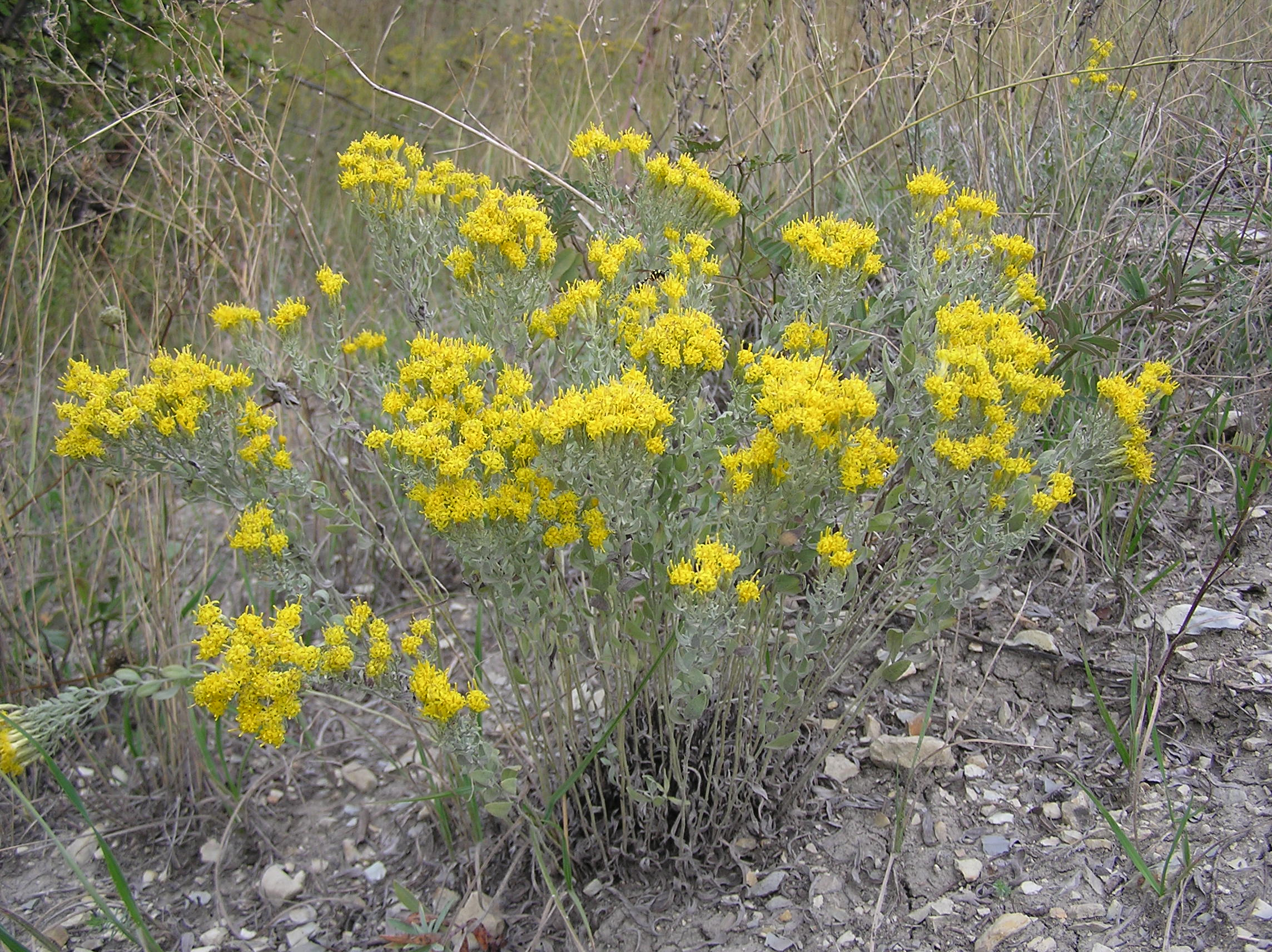
- Galatella villosa
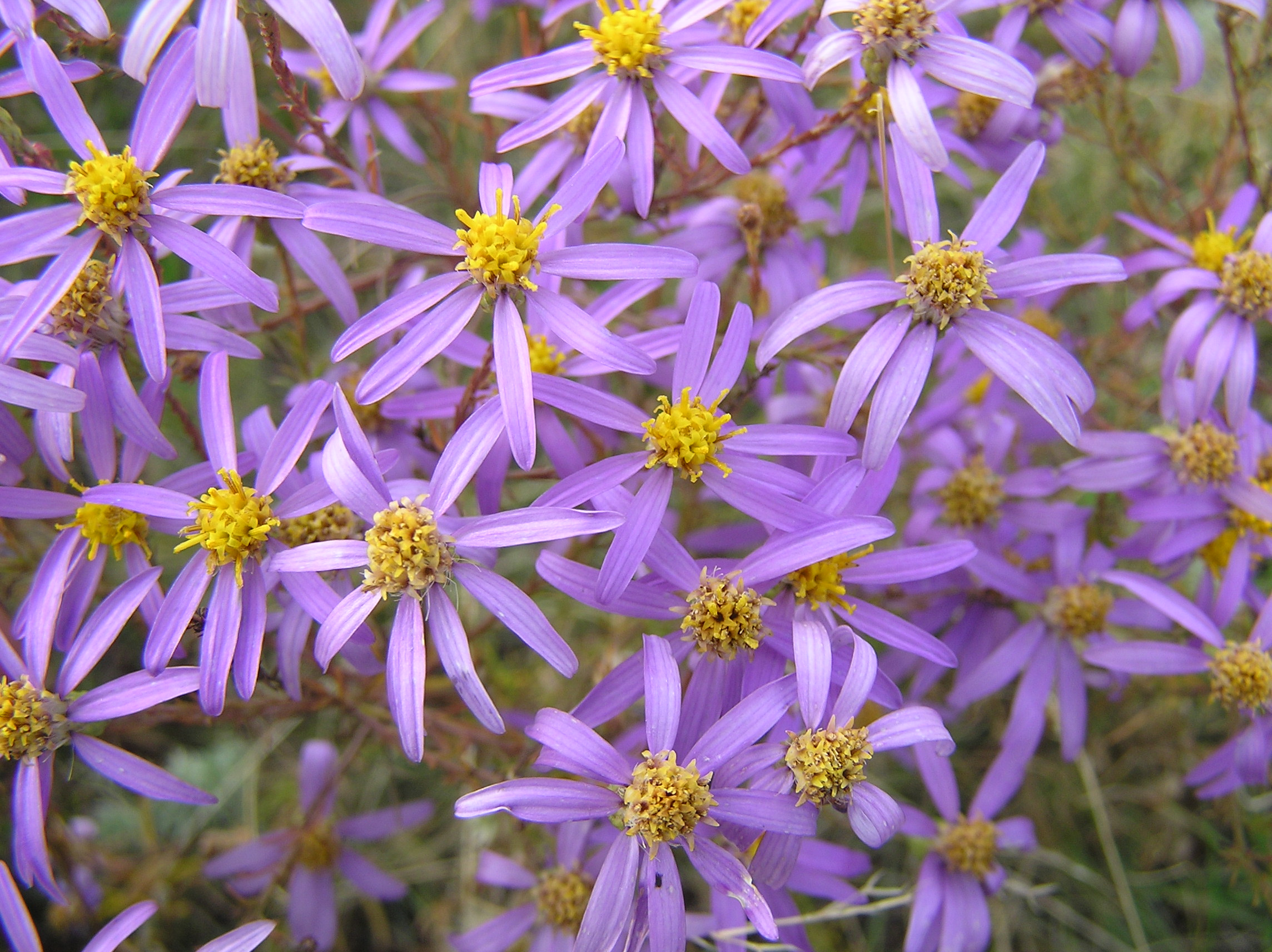
- Galatella angustissima

Scientific classification
- Kingdom: Plantae
- Clade: Tracheophytes
- Clade: Angiosperms
- Clade: Eudicots
- Clade: Asterids
- Order: Asterales
- Family: Asteraceae
- Subfamily: Asteroideae
- Tribe: Astereae
- Subtribe: Bellidinae
- Genus: Galatella; Cass.

Synonyms
- List: Crinita Moench; Crinitaria Cass.; Crinitina Soják; Deinosmos Raf.; Galatea (Cass.) Less.; Linosyris Cass.; Pseudolinosyris Novopokr.

= Galatella =

Genus of flowering plants

Galatella is a genus of flowering plants in the family Asteraceae, native to Europe, Asia, and northern Africa.

== Species ==
The following species are recognised in the genus Galatella:

- Galatella albanica Degen
- Galatella altaica Tzvelev
- Galatella amani (Post) Grierson
- Galatella anatolica Hamzaoğlu & Budak
- Galatella angustissima (Tausch) Novopokr.
- Galatella aragonensis Nees
- Galatella asperella (Rech.f. & Köie) Sennikov
- Galatella bectauatensis Kupr. & Koroljuk
- Galatella biflora (L.) Nees
- Galatella cana (Waldst. & Kit.) Nees
- Galatella chromopappa Novopokr.
- Galatella chulbairica Tulyag.
- Galatella coriacea Novopokr.
- Galatella corymbulosa (Bornm.) Sennikov
- Galatella cretica Gand.
- Galatella crinitoides Novopokr.
- Galatella dahurica DC.
- Galatella divaricata (M.Bieb.) Novopokr.
- Galatella fastigiiformis Novopokr.
- Galatella × feketegaborii A.Takács, Sennikov & Sramkó
- Galatella grimmii (Regel & Schmalh.) Sennikov
- Galatella hauptii (Ledeb.) Lindl. ex DC.
- Galatella hissarica Novopokr.
- Galatella linosyris (L.) Rchb.f.
- Galatella litvinovii Novopokr.
- Galatella malacitana Blanca, Gavira & Suár.-Sant.
- Galatella polygaloides Novopokr.
- Galatella regelii Tzvelev
- Galatella saxatilis Novopokr.
- Galatella scoparia (Kar. & Kir.) Novopokr.
- Galatella sedifolia (L.) Greuter
- Galatella × sublinosyris Tzvelev
- Galatella × subtatarica Tzvelev
- Galatella × subvillosa Tzvelev
- Galatella tatarica (Less.) Novopokr.
- Galatella tianschanica Novopokr.
- Galatella × tzvelevii Vasjukov & Saksonov
- Galatella villosa (L.) Rchb.f.
- Galatella villosula Novopokr.
