= Lox Yeo =

River in north Somerset, England

Lox Yeo Lox
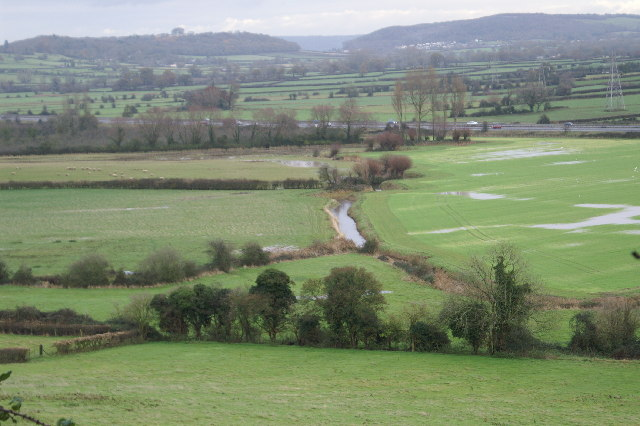
- Lox Yeo River with the M5 motorway in the background

Location
- Country: England
- State: Somerset
- District: North Somerset

Physical characteristics
- Source
  - location: Winscombe, North Somerset, Somerset, England
  - coordinates: 51°18′57″N 2°50′55″W
- Mouth: River Axe
  - location: Loxton, North Somerset, Somerset, England
  - coordinates: 51°17′28″N 2°53′17″W
- Length: 4 mi (6.4 km)

The Lox Yeo is a short river in North Somerset, England. It rises at Winscombe and flows south west for about 6 kilometres (4 mi) to join the River Axe near Loxton.

The river flows through a gap in the Mendip Hills between Crook Peak and Bleadon Hill, through which the M5 motorway now runs.

The river was once known simply as the Lox. The name appears to be of Celtic origin, and means either "winding stream" or "bright one".
