= Loxton, Somerset =

Village in Somerset, England

Coordinates: 51.2951°N 2.8957°W

Loxton
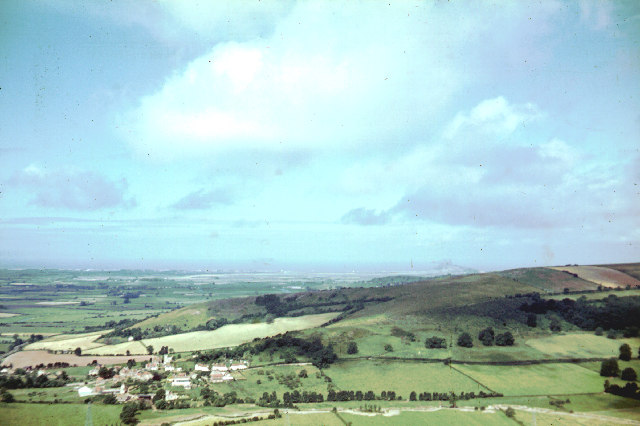
- Loxton from Crook Peak

- Location within Somerset
- Population: 214 (2021)
- OS grid reference: ST375555
- Unitary authority: North Somerset
- Ceremonial county: Somerset
- Region: South West
- Country: England
- Sovereign state: United Kingdom
- Post town: AXBRIDGE
- Postcode district: BS26
- Dialling code: 01934
- Police: Avon and Somerset
- Fire: Avon
- Ambulance: South Western
- UK Parliament: Wells and Mendip Hills

Loxton is a village and civil parish in Somerset, England. It is close to the M5 motorway in the unitary authority of North Somerset. The parish includes the village of Christon and has a population of 214.

== History ==
Loxton takes its name from the Lox Yeo River (once simply known as the Lox), on which it is situated. The village is mentioned in the Domesday Book as Lochestone. The parish was part of the Winterstoke Hundred.

The village has been populated since Norman times. Old mine-workings on the hills indicate that at one time mining was abundant, probably for calamine, lead, copper and more recently yellow ochre.

During the construction of the M5 motorway a Roman or pre-Roman settlement was uncovered at Christon.

Christon Court has medieval origins, but the current building dates from the 17th century.

=== 1954 murder ===
In 1954 the village came to national attention when Noreen O'Connor, a nurse, killed Friederika Alwine Maria Buls by "plucking out" her eyes. She was tried for murder and found guilty but insane.

== Governance ==
The parish council has responsibility for local issues, including setting an annual precept (local rate) to cover the council's operating costs and producing annual accounts for public scrutiny. The parish council evaluates local planning applications and works with the local police, district council officers, and neighbourhood watch groups on matters of crime, security, and traffic. The parish council's role also includes initiating projects for the maintenance and repair of parish facilities, such as the village hall or community centre, playing fields and playgrounds, as well as consulting with the district council on the maintenance, repair, and improvement of highways, drainage, footpaths, public transport, and street cleaning. Conservation matters (including trees and listed buildings) and environmental issues are also of interest to the council.

The parish falls within the unitary authority of North Somerset which was created in 1996, as established by the Local Government Act 1992. It provides a single tier of local government with responsibility for almost all local government functions within its area including local planning and building control, local roads, council housing, environmental health, markets and fairs, refuse collection, recycling, cemeteries, crematoria, leisure services, parks, and tourism. I is also responsible for education, social services, libraries, main roads, public transport, trading standards, waste disposal and strategic planning, although fire, police and ambulance services are provided jointly with other authorities through the Avon Fire and Rescue Service, Avon and Somerset Constabulary and the Great Western Ambulance Service.

North Somerset's area covers part of the ceremonial county of Somerset but it is administered independently of the non-metropolitan county. Its administrative headquarters is in the town hall in Weston-super-Mare. Between 1 April 1974 and 1 April 1996, it was the Woodspring district of the county of Avon. Before 1974 the parish was part of the Axbridge Rural District.

The parish is represented in the House of Commons of the Parliament of the United Kingdom as part of the Wells and Mendip Hills constituency. It elects one Member of Parliament (MP) by the first past the post system of election.

== Geography ==
The Mendip Way long-distance path passes through the village.

== Religious sites ==
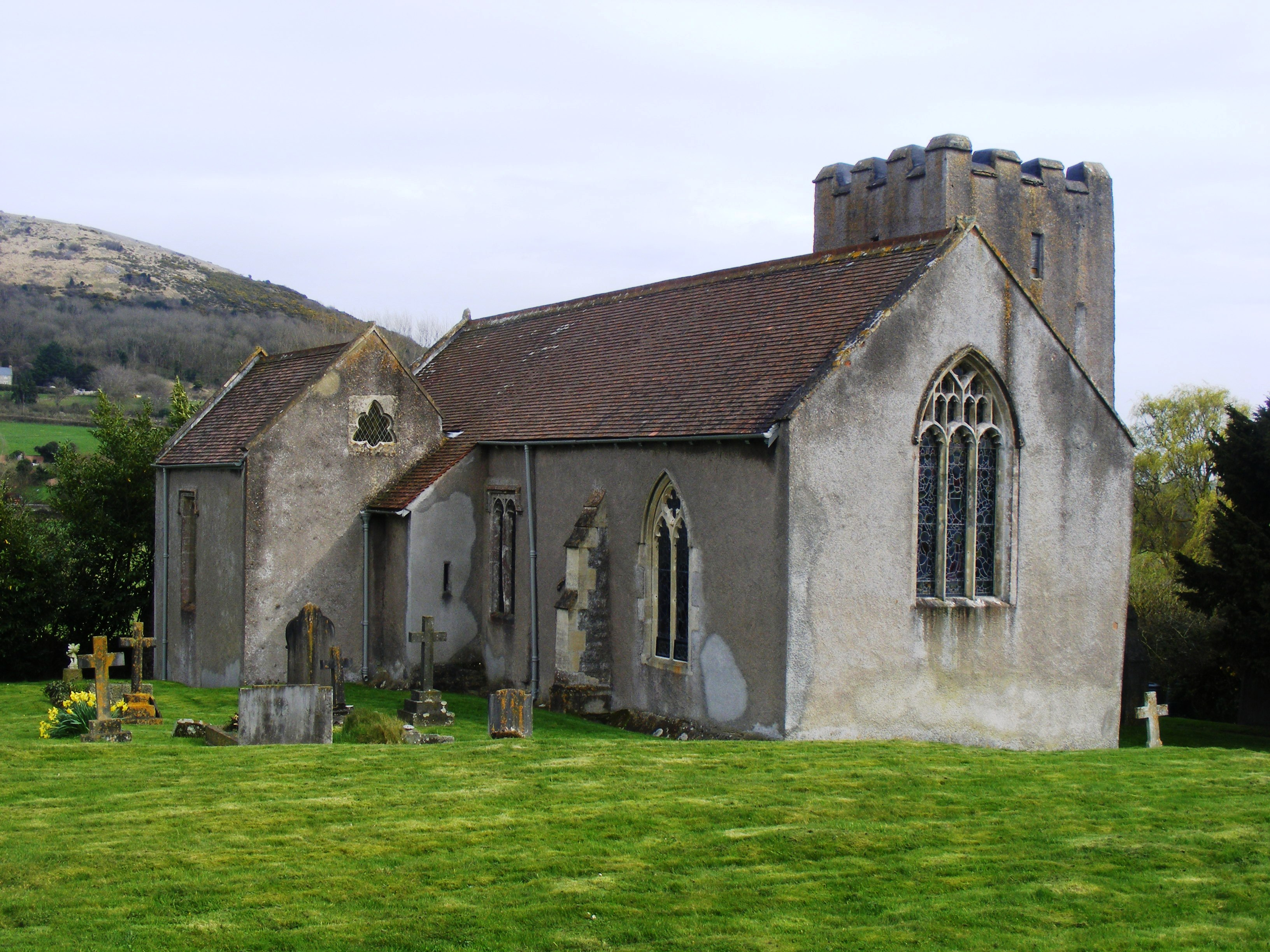
Church of St Andrew

The Parish Church of St Andrew in Loxton dates from the 11th century and is a Grade II* listed building.

The Church of St Mary in Christon dates from the 12th century and has been designated by English Heritage as a Grade I listed building,
