= Weston Bay =

Bay in Somerset, England

Coordinates: 51°20′N 3°00′W

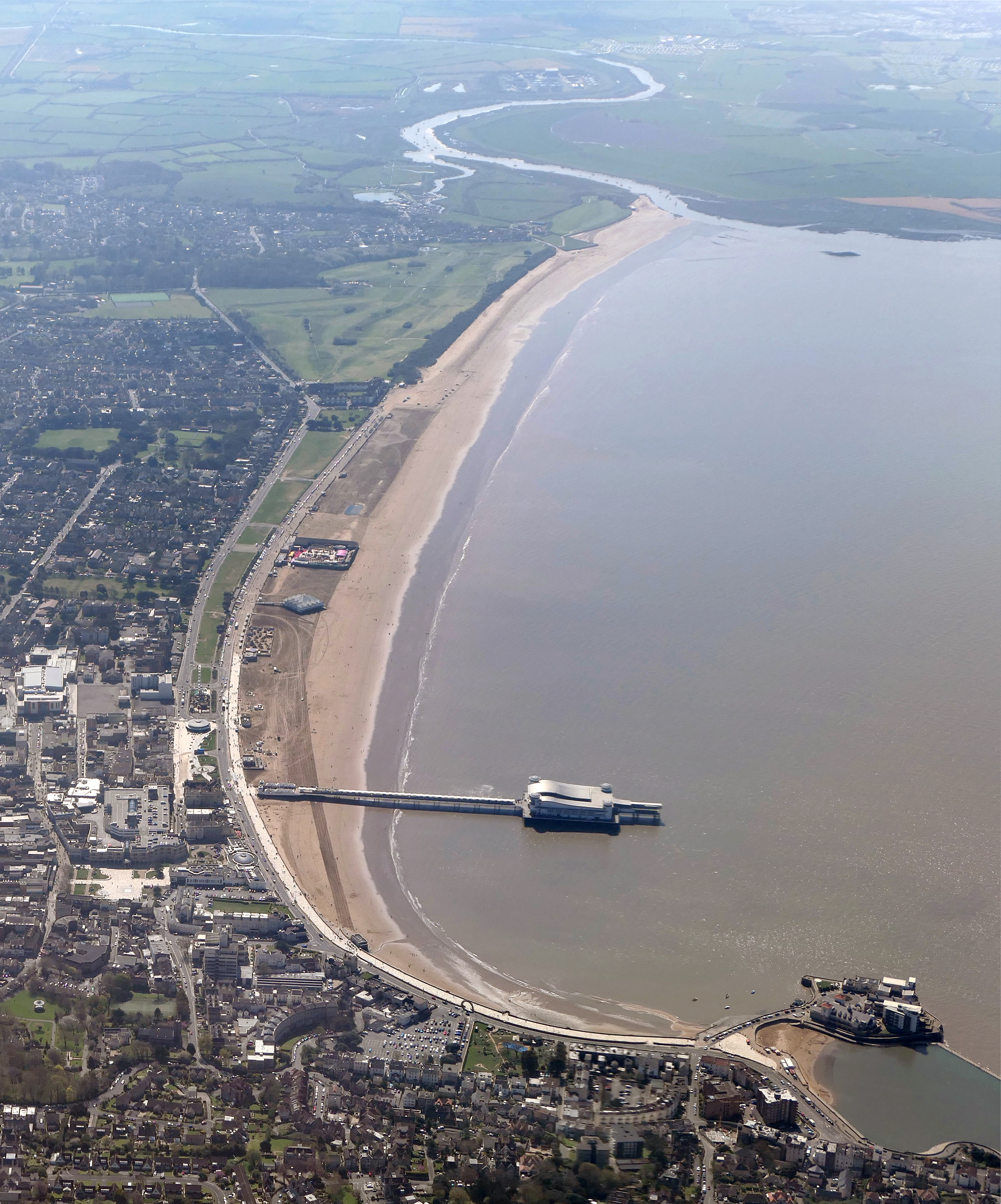
Aerial view of the eastern third of the bay and the seafront of Weston-super-Mare.

Weston Bay is an inlet of the Bristol Channel in North Somerset, England.

It lies between Brean Down, which is now owned by the National Trust, is rich in wildlife, history and archaeology, and has been designated a Site of Special Scientific Interest to the south, and Worlebury Hill to the north. Quarrying took place at various places on Worlebury Hill from the late 18th century until the town quarry was abandoned in 1953. Weston Woods, which cover a large part of the hill top, were awarded a Planting Places Award in a scheme run by Sustainability South West to celebrate "brilliant examples of urban greenspaces" on 6 March 2008.

Much of the bay forms the seafront for Weston-super-Mare. Two piers stick out into the bay. The grade II* listed Birnbeck Pier was designed by Eugenius Birch and opened in 1867. The early 20th century Grand Pier, is supported by 600 iron piles, and is 400 metres (1,300 ft) long. It has been damaged by fire on two occasions, once in 1930 and again in 2008.

Owing to the large rise and fall of the tides in the Bristol Channel, the low tide mark is about a mile from the seafront. Although the beach itself is sandy, further seawards the shore is thick mud, which is very dangerous to walk in and is crossed by the mouth of the River Axe. From the bay, views of the islands of Flat Holm and Steep Holm are visible.
