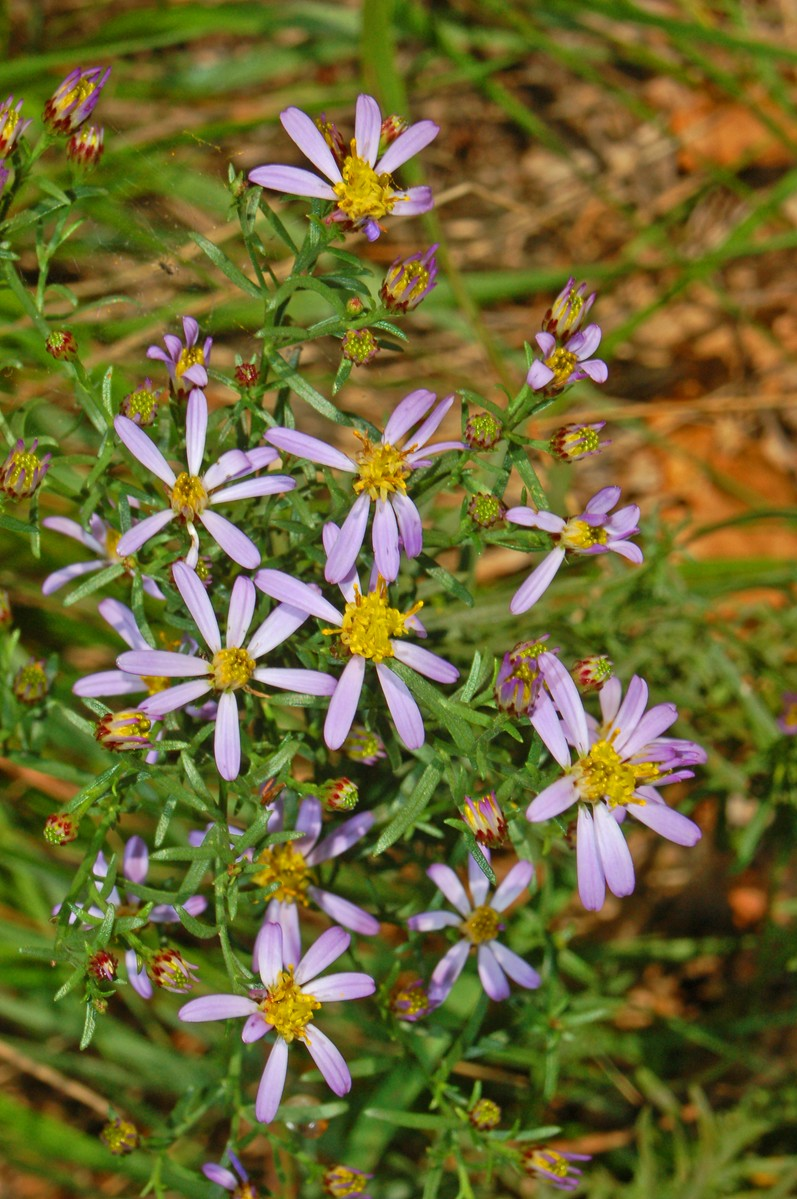

Scientific classification
- Kingdom: Plantae
- Clade: Tracheophytes
- Clade: Angiosperms
- Clade: Eudicots
- Clade: Asterids
- Order: Asterales
- Family: Asteraceae
- Genus: Galatella
- Species: G. sedifolia

Binomial name
- Galatella sedifolia (L.) Greuter

Synonyms
- Aster acris L., nom. illeg.; Aster hyssopifolius L.; Aster punctatus Waldst. & Kit.; Aster sedifolius L.; Galatella hyssopifolia (L.) Nees; Galatella insculpta Nees; Galatella punctata (Waldst. & Kit.) Nees; Galatella rossica Novopokr.

= Galatella sedifolia =

Species of flowering plant

Galatella sedifolia, often known by the synonym Aster sedifolius, is herbaceous perennial plant belonging to the genus Galatella of the family Asteraceae.

== Description ==
The flowers are lavender-blue or pinkish-lilac, with five to ten petals and a quite protruding yellow centre. Leaves are small, elongated and untoothed. This plant grows to a height of about 60–90 cm (2–3 ft) at an altitude of 0–1,200 m (0–3,900 ft) above sea level. The period of flowering is from July until late autumn.

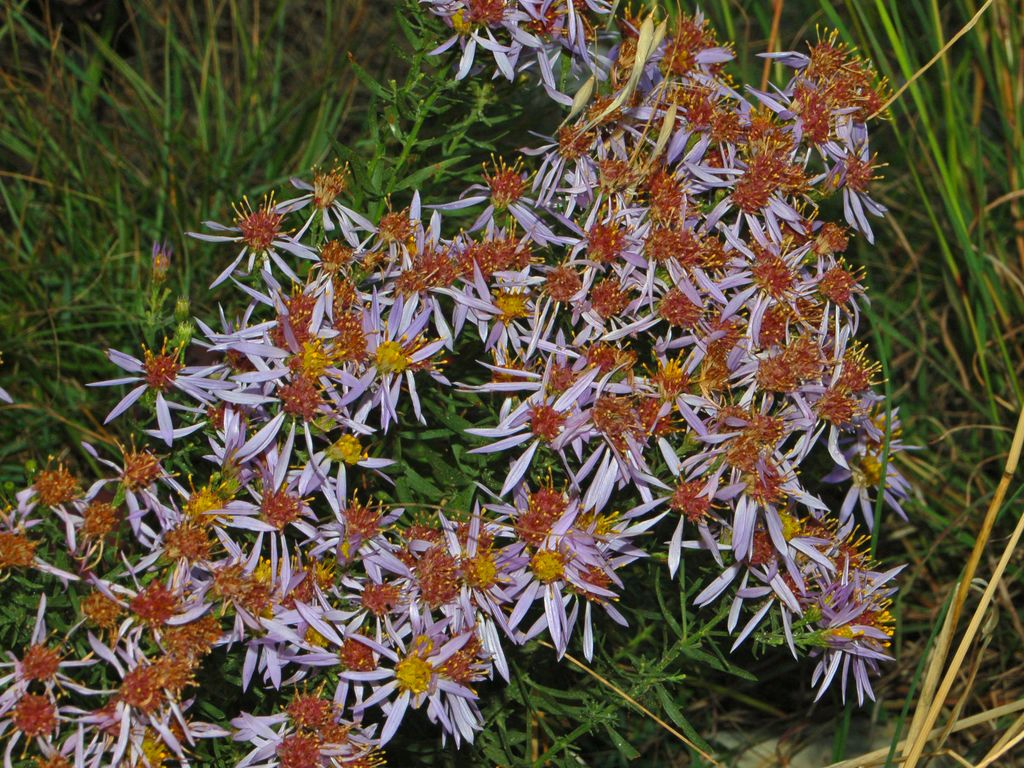
G. sedifolia

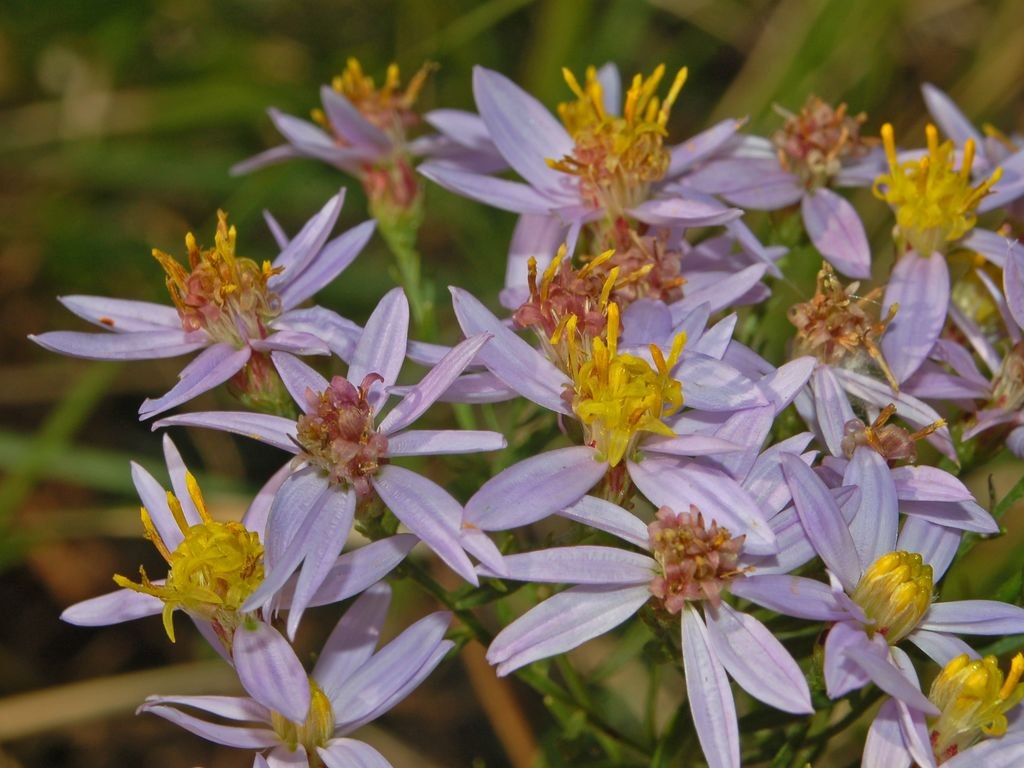
Flowers of G. sedifolia

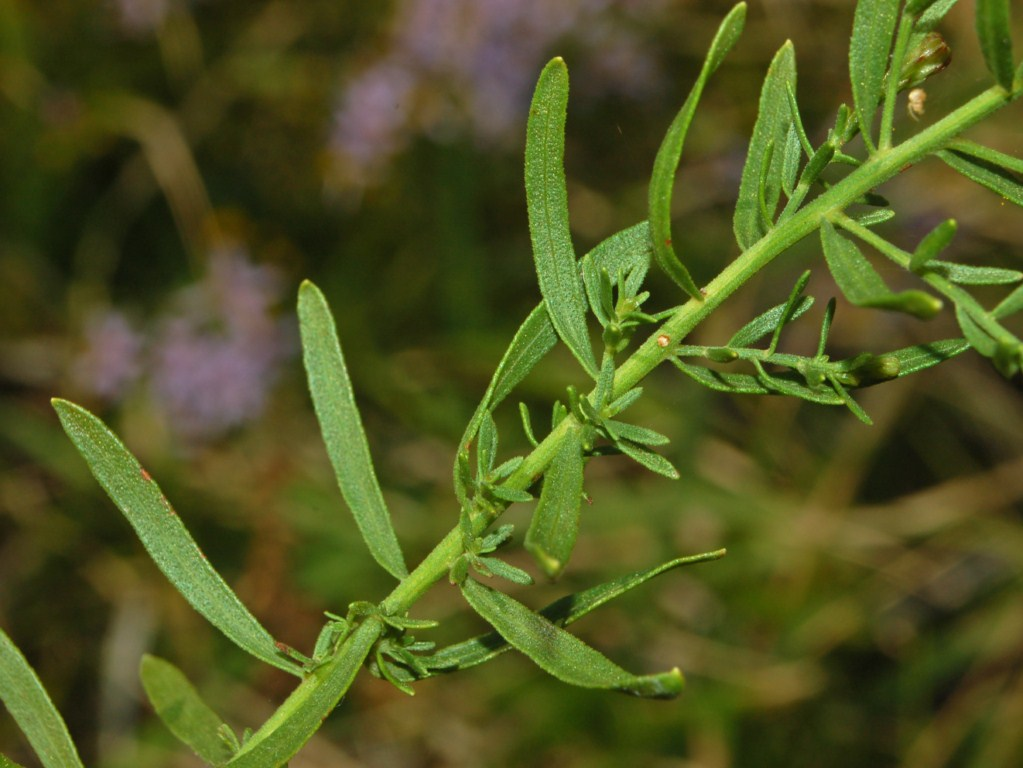
Leaves of G. sedifolia
