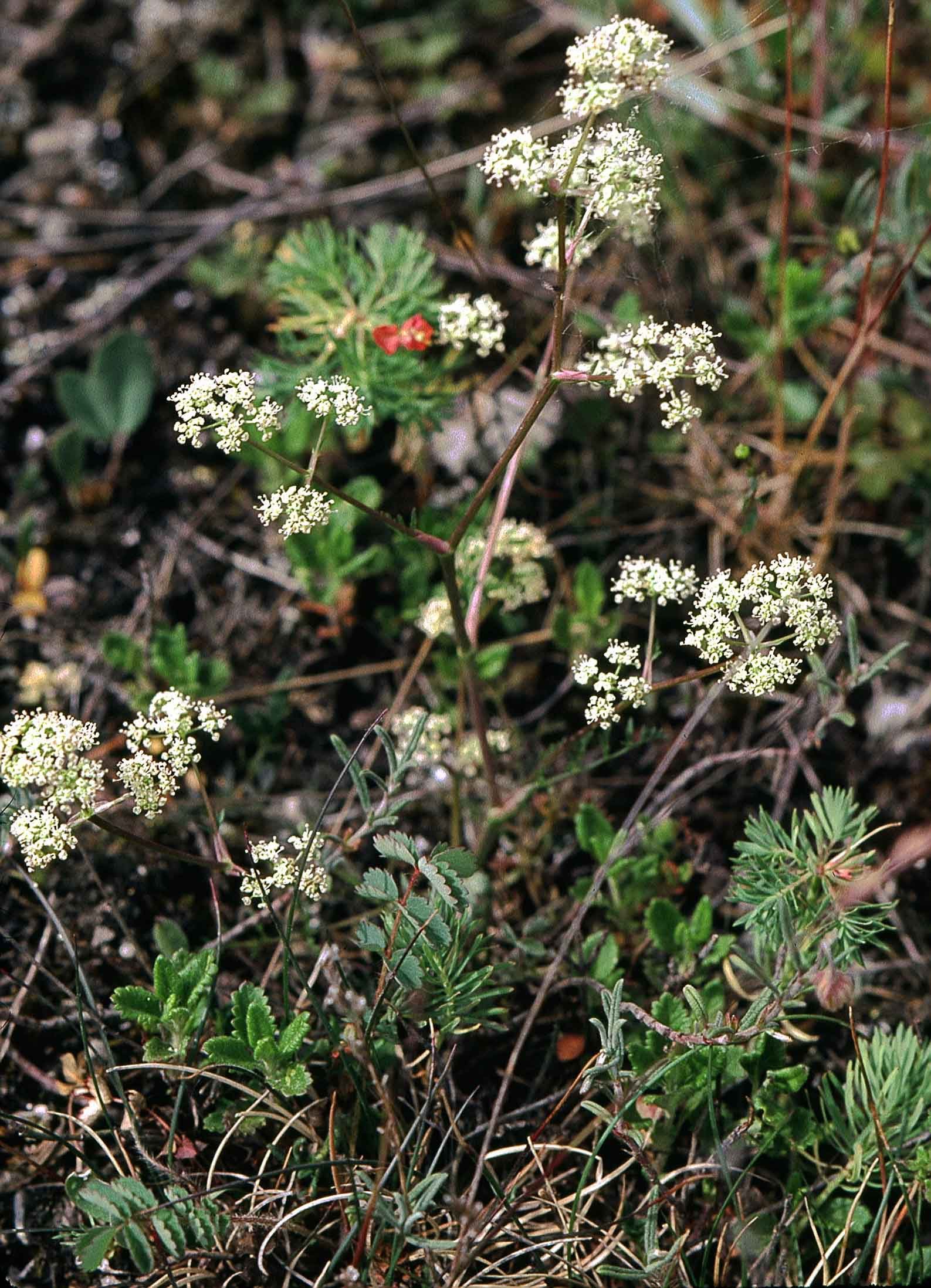

Scientific classification
- Kingdom: Plantae
- Clade: Embryophytes
- Clade: Tracheophytes
- Clade: Angiosperms
- Clade: Eudicots
- Clade: Asterids
- Order: Apiales
- Family: Apiaceae
- Genus: Trinia
- Species: T. glauca

Binomial name
- Trinia glauca (L.) Dumort.

= Trinia glauca =

Honewort

Species of plant

Trinia glauca (honewort) is a low-growing umbellifer found in rocky areas.

== Description ==
Honewort is a low-growing glabrous plant. Its stems can reach 20 cm, and are surrounded by abundant fibrous remains of petioles at the base. It is much-branched, with the branches spreading at a wide angle. The leaves are glaucous, and are 2- to 3- times pinnate, although upper leaves are less divided. The inflorescence is an umbel, with white flowers, and no sepals. It has an ovoid, laterally compressed fruit.

== Taxonomy and nomenclature ==
The genus Trinia is named after the German-born botanist Carl Bernhard von Trinius.

== Habitat ==
In Britain, honewort is restricted to dry stony limestone sites, typically occurring in short, open, grazed turf on south-facing slopes.

== Status and distribution ==
Honewort is found in central and southern Europe, north to southern England, and in southwest Asia.

=== Status in Britain ===
In Britain, honewort is found as a native species in three areas, all in southwest England: the Avon Gorge near Bristol, coastal limestone in South Devon, and in the western Mendip Hills (including the adjacent coast). Its British range covers around 20 sites in all, and the two largest native populations, comprising around 10,000 plants each, are both in this last area, at Sand Point and Crook Peak. British populations are all of subspecies glauca.

In the Avon Gorge, it was first found by William Turner in 1562, one of the first rare plants to be documented in Britain. The stronghold of the species is in the western Mendip Hills, where it was first found by Dillenius in c. 1726. Here, in addition to the Crook Peak and Sand Point sites, it is found on Purn Hill, on Wavering Down, Cross Plain and Axbridge Hill, at Hellenge Hill and South Hill near Bleadon, and the nearby coastal limestone sites of Worlebury Hill and Uphill Cliff and Walborough. Although many other rare limestone plants occur there, honewort has not been found on Brean Down. In Devon, the species is found at a single site, Berry Head.

It also occurs at Goblin Combe in North Somerset, where it was introduced as an experiment. Six rooted plants were planted and 40 seeds sown in 1955, and in 1989 18,000 plants were counted here. An 1868 specimen from Long Knoll, in Wiltshire, which may be of this species, is present in Taunton Castle Museum.

== Conservation ==
In Britain, several of the species' sites are protected as Sites of Special Scientific Interest.
