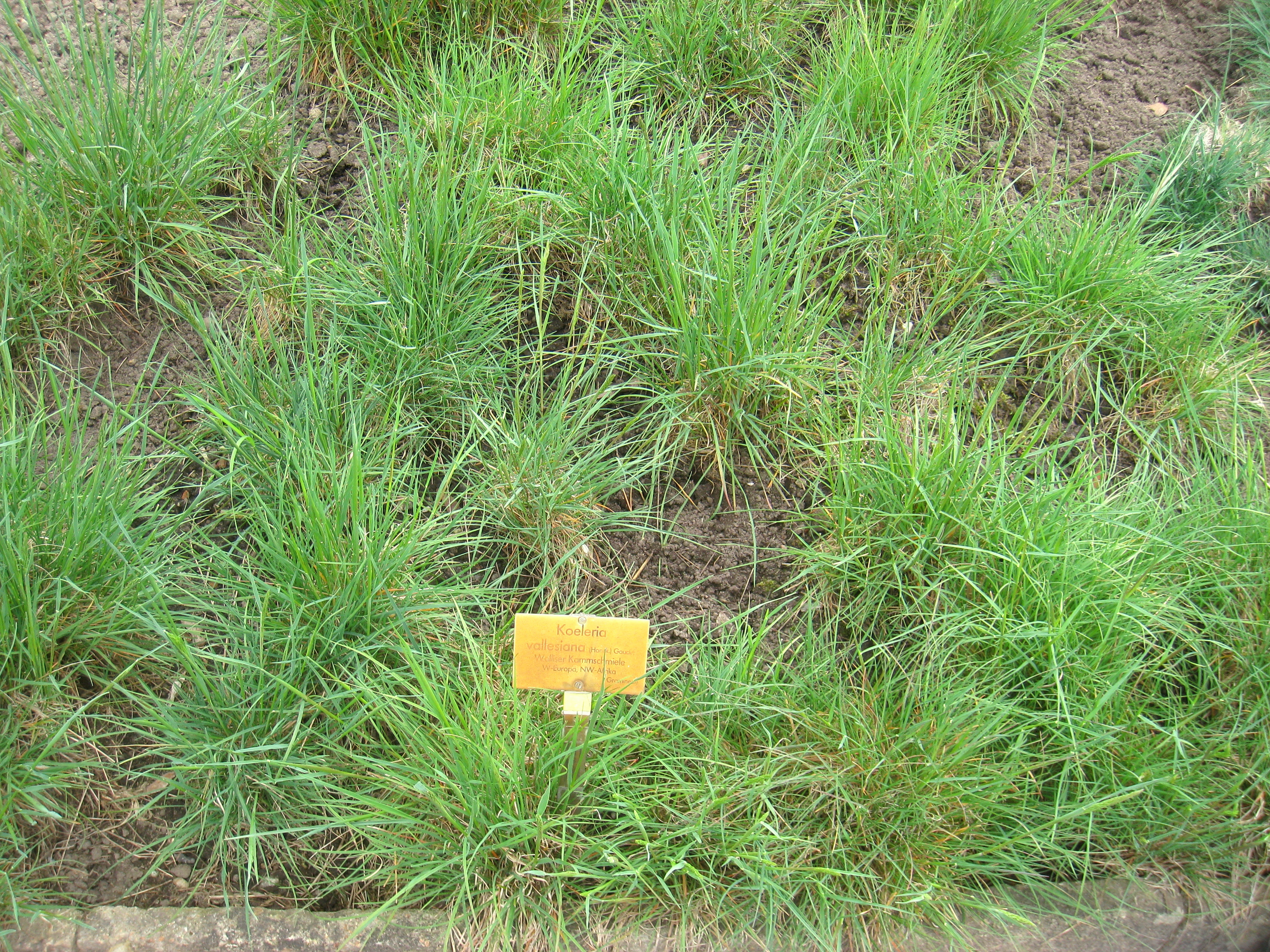

Scientific classification
- Kingdom: Plantae
- Clade: Tracheophytes
- Clade: Angiosperms
- Clade: Monocots
- Clade: Commelinids
- Order: Poales
- Family: Poaceae
- Subfamily: Pooideae
- Genus: Koeleria
- Species: K. vallesiana

Binomial name
- Koeleria vallesiana (Honck.) Gaudin

= Koeleria vallesiana =

Species of grass

Koeleria vallesiana, the Somerset hair grass, is a grass species of the genus Koeleria. It grows in Europe, temperate Asia, and North America.

== References and external links ==
- GrassBase - The Online World Grass Flora
