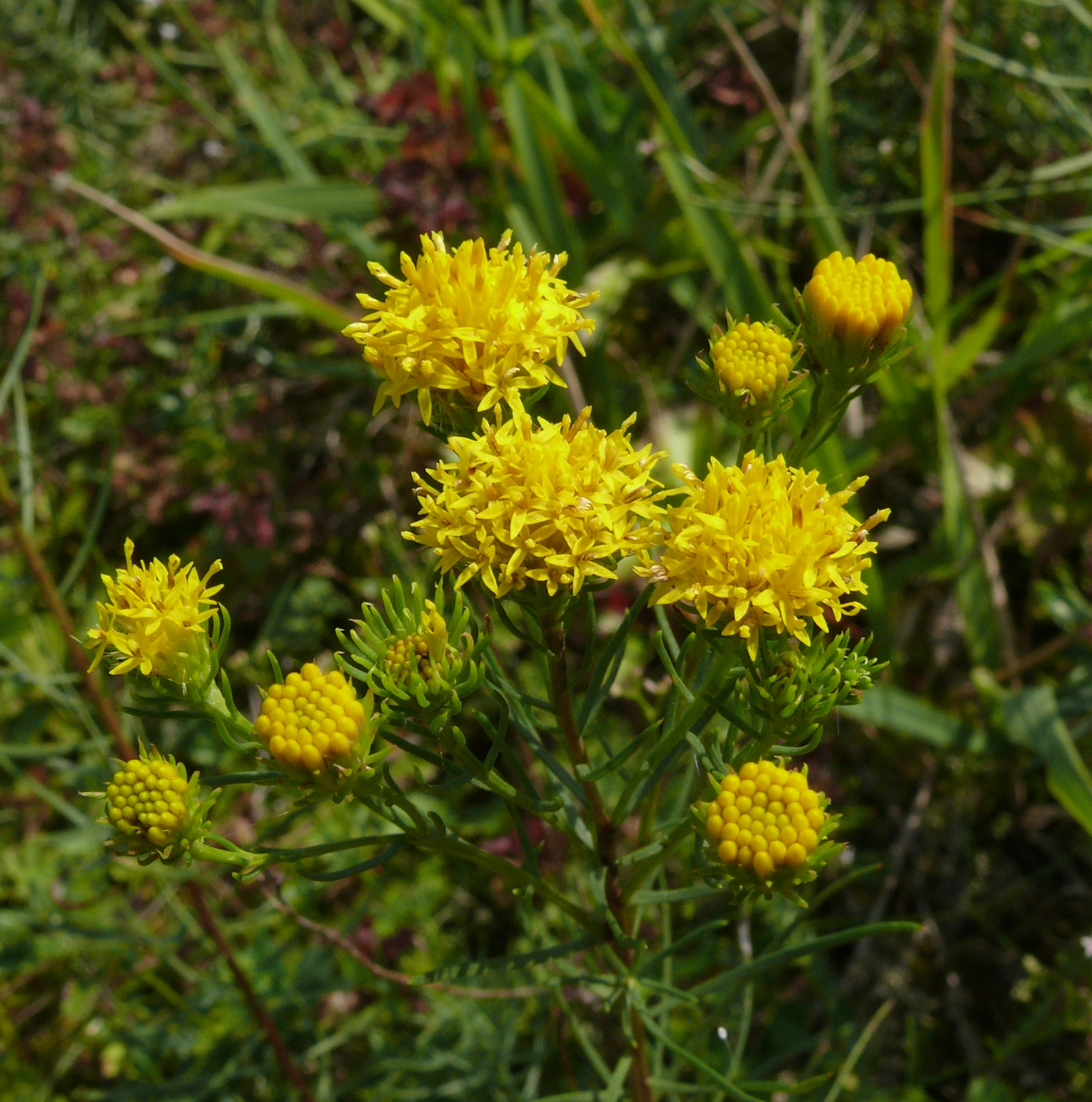

Scientific classification
- Kingdom: Plantae
- Clade: Tracheophytes
- Clade: Angiosperms
- Clade: Eudicots
- Clade: Asterids
- Order: Asterales
- Family: Asteraceae
- Genus: Galatella
- Species: G. linosyris

Binomial name
- Galatella linosyris (L.) Rchb.f.

Synonyms
- Aster linosyris (L.) Bernh.; Chrysocoma linosyris L.; Crinitina linosyris (L.) Soják; Crinitaria linosyris (L.) Less.; Linosyris vulgaris Cass.

= Galatella linosyris =

Species of plant

Galatella linosyris (also called goldilocks aster, and often known by the synonyms Aster linosyris and Crinitaria linosyris) is a species of perennial plant from family Asteraceae found in Eastern, Central and Southern Europe. It can also be found in Great Britain, the southern part of Scandinavia and in Asia Minor. The flowers are yellow coloured. The species have stems up to 10–50 centimetres (3.9–19.7 in), with leaves that are lanceolate. The plant does not have ray flowers, only disk florets. It blooms from July to September. The fruits are achenes. The species is under protection in the Czech Republic.
