= List of national nature reserves in Somerset =

National nature reserves in Somerset

1. Barrington Hill; 2. Bridgwater Bay; 3. Dunkery and Horner Wood; 4. Ebbor Gorge; 5. Gordano Valley	6. Ham Wall; 7. Hardington Moor; 8. Hawkcombe Woods; 9. Huntspill River; 10. Leigh Woods	11. Rodney Stoke; 12. Shapwick Heath; 13. Somerset Levels; 14. Tarr Steps Woodland; 15. Westhay Moor

The ceremonial county of Somerset is governed by three unitary authorities, North Somerset, Bath and North East Somerset and Somerset Council.

National nature reserves in England (NNR) are designated under Part III of the National Parks and Access to the Countryside Act 1949 that are deemed to be of national importance by Natural England as key places for wildlife and natural features in England using section 35(1) of the Wildlife and Countryside Act 1981. They were established to protect the most significant areas of habitat and of geological formations. NNRs are managed on behalf of the nation, many by Natural England themselves, but also by non-governmental organisations, including Avon Wildlife Trust or the Somerset Wildlife Trust, the National Trust, and the Royal Society for the Protection of Birds.

There are 15 national nature reserves in the county. The largest is Bridgwater Bay which has been recognised under the Ramsar Convention and covers 2,639 hectares (6,521 acres) of mud flats, saltmarsh, sandflats and shingle ridges. The smallest is Hardington Moor at 8.7 hectares (21.5 acres) in area. Several of the sites are associated with rivers and low-lying areas of the Somerset Levels. The highest is Dunkery and Horner Wood which covers 1,604 hectares (3,964 acres) of wet and dry heathland, ancient woodland and open grassland on Exmoor including Dunkery Beacvon, the highest point in the county. Ebbor Gorge is important for both biological and geological interest.

== Sites ==
Site	Photograph	Unitary authority	Area (Note: Unless specified otherwise, the area is taken from the MAGIC map of each site. (Click on the identify icon (i) in the "Feature Tools" and then click on the site.))	Location (Note: The location is a central point within the site.)	Map (Note: The maps link to the UK Government MAGIC mapping system.)	Details (Note: Details are on the pages on each site in the Natural England listing of national nature reserves in the county.)	Description
Barrington Hill		Somerset	17.8 hectares (44.0 acres)	Broadway; 50.948°N 2.997°W; ST300170	Map	Details	This site comprises four meadows surrounded by well-established hedges on gently sloping clay-rich soils. It is an outstanding example of a traditionally managed unimproved neutral grassland of a type now rare in Britain. The meadows belong to a type characterised by the widespread occurrence of sweet vernal grass (Anthoxanthum odoratum), crested dog's-tail (Cynosurus cristatus), cowslip (Primula veris) and green-winged orchid (Orchis morio). A total of 74 species of orchids have so far been recorded. This site is one of only three localities in Britain in which the grass Gaudinia fragilis is a prominent feature of the sward.
Bridgwater Bay		Somerset	2,639 hectares (6,521 acres)	Otterhampton; 51.183°N 3.080°W; ST246431	Map	Details	Bridgwater Bay is on the Bristol Channel, 5 kilometres (3.1 mi) north of Bridgwater at the mouth of the River Parrett and the end of the River Parrett Trail. It consists of large areas of mud flats, saltmarsh, sandflats and shingle ridges, some of which are vegetated. It has been designated as a Site of Special Scientific Interest since 1989, and is designated as a wetland of international importance under the Ramsar Convention. In addition to the rivers, Parrett, Brue and Washford several of the man-made drainage ditches, including the River Huntspill, from the Somerset Levels, including the "Pawlett Hams", also drain into the bay.
Dunkery and Horner Wood		Somerset	1,604 hectares (3,964 acres)	Luccombe; 51.189°N 3.559°W; SS910445	Map	Details	The Dunkery and Horner Wood NNR is one of the largest in England. It includes Dunkery Hill, the highest point on Exmoor and in Somerset, wet and dry heathland, ancient woodland and open grassland. Much of the NNR is within the National Trust-owned Holnicote Estate.
Ebbor Gorge		Somerset	47 hectares (116 acres)	St Cuthbert Out; 51.234°N 2.682°W; ST525485	Map	Details	Ebbor Gorge is a limestone gorge. It was donated to the National Trust in 1967 and is now managed by Natural England. The gorge was cut into the Clifton Down Limestone, an example of Carboniferous Limestone, by water. The floor of the gorge is impermeable Millstone Grit and Lower Coal Measures. The rare mineral mendipite has also been found. The site was occupied by humans in the Neolithic Era and their tools and flint arrow heads have been discovered, along with pottery from the Bronze Age. There are also fossils of small mammals from the end of the last ice age. The nature reserve provides a habitat for a variety of flora and fauna, including flowers, butterflies and bats.
Gordano Valley		North Somerset	126 hectares (311 acres)	Walton in Gordano; 51.453°N 2.814°W; ST433731	Map	Details	A Site of Special Scientific Interest, for ornithological, entomological and stratigraphic interest. Several sites in the valley are managed by the Avon Wildlife Trust as nature reserves. These include; Weston Big Wood, Clapton Moor, Weston Moor and Walton Common. The unimproved wet meadow communities largely consist of variants of the nationally rare blunt-flowered rush–marsh thistle (Juncus subnodulosus–cirsium palustre), soft/sharp flowered rush–marsh bedstraw (Juncus effusus/acutiflorus–Galium palustre), purple moorgrass–meadow thistle (Molinia caerulea–cirsium dissectum) and crested dog's-tail–common knapweed (Cynosurus cristatus–centaurea nigra) community types. In total over 130 species of flowering plant have been recorded including 3 species of orchids, 21 grasses and 14 sedges. The extensive system of rhynes and field ditches contains a rich flora which includes three nationally scarce species: water parsnip (Sium latafolium), whorled water milfoil (Myriophyllum verticillatum) and fen pondweed (Potamogeton coloratus).
Ham Wall		Somerset	87.27 hectares (215.6 acres)	Sharpham; 51.155°N 2.682°W; ST525485	Map	Details	The Ham Wall national nature reserve, 4 kilometres (2.5 mi) west of Glastonbury, on the Somerset Levels in the valley of the River Brue is managed by the Royal Society for the Protection of Birds. It is part of the Brue Valley Living Landscape conservation project which aims to restore, recreate and reconnect habitat. This new wetland habitat has been established from out peat diggings and now consists of areas of reedbed, wet scrub, open water and peripheral grassland and woodland. Many bird species live on or visit the site including the bearded tit, bittern, Cetti's warbler, hobby and starling.
Hardington Moor		Somerset	8.7 hectares (21.5 acres)	Hardington Mandeville; 50.914°N 2.691°W; ST515130	Map	Details	Hardington Moor is a biological Site of Special Scientific Interest between Hardington Mandeville and West Coker, notified in 1994. Hardington Moor national nature reserve covers partly calcareous clay-rich soils on sloping ground and comprises three meadows surrounded by established hedges. The meadows are examples of species-rich unimproved neutral grassland, which is now nationally rare. The rare French oat-grass is very abundant on the site and the fields are home to a wide variety of plant species, most notably adder's tongue, corky-fruited water-dropwort and large numbers of green-winged orchid. Invertebrates found at the site include butterflies such as gatekeeper, small tortoiseshell and common blue. Less commonly seen are large skipper, green-veined white and green hairstreak.
Hawkcombe Woods		Somerset	98 hectares (242 acres)	Porlock; 51.202°N 3.593°W; SS886459	Map	Details	Hawkcombe Woods is near Porlock on Exmoor. The 101 hectares (249.6 acres) woodlands are notable for their lichens, heath fritillary butterfly, red wood ant colonies, dead wood invertebrates and ancient pollards. They are part of the North Exmoor Site of Special Scientific Interest.
Huntspill River		Somerset	149 hectares (368 acres)	East Huntspill; 51.208°N 3.014°W; ST291459	Map	Details	The River Huntspill (or Huntspill River) is an artificial river, in the Somerset Levels. It was built in 1940 to supply process water to ROF Bridgwater, and has resulted in reduced flooding of the lower Brue Valley. Huntspill Sluice at the river's western end, also known as West Huntspill Sluice, separates it from the River Parrett. A stretch of the river, from Gold Corner to Huntspill Sluice (excluding the Cripps River), is a national nature reserve. The NNR is managed by the Environment Agency. The river discharges into the River Parrett, just south of Highbridge which then flows into Bridgwater Bay. Public access to the site is restricted.
Leigh Woods		North Somerset	64 hectares (158 acres)	Leigh Woods; 51.463°N 2.639°W; ST559733	Map	Details	Leigh Woods is an area of woodland on the south-west side of the Avon Gorge, close to the Clifton Suspension Bridge, within North Somerset opposite the English city of Bristol and north of the Ashton Court estate, of which it formed a part. In 1909 part of the woodland was donated to the National Trust by George Alfred Wills, to prevent development of the city beside the gorge following the building of the Leigh Woods suburb. Areas not owned by the National Trust have since been taken over by the Forestry Commission. It is included in the Avon Gorge Site of Special Scientific Interest, Rare trees include multiple species of Sorbus with at least nine native and four imported species. Bristol rockcress (Arabis scabra) which is unique to the Avon Gorge can be seen flowering in April; various species of orchids and western spiked speedwell (Veronica spicata) are common in June and July.
Rodney Stoke		Somerset	51 hectares (126 acres)	Rodney Stoke; 51.253°N 2.729°W; ST492507	Map	Details	Rodney Stoke is a biological Site of Special Scientific Interest, just north of the village of Rodney Stoke in the Mendip Hills. Part of the site is a national nature reserve and part a Nature Conservation Review Woodland site. This site supports a mosaic of ancient semi-natural broadleaved woodland, scrub and species-rich unimproved grassland. Two nationally rare plants occur at Rodney Stoke: purple gromwell (Lithospermum purpurocaeruleum) and the endemic whitebeam (Sorbus anglica). The site supports a diverse fauna. Badgers (Meles meles) are common and two or three setts are occupied each year. Noctule bats (Nyctalus noctula) and pipistrelle bats (Pipistrellus pipistrellus) roost in Big Stoke. Breeding birds include buzzard (Buteo buteo) and spotted flycatcher (Muscicapa striata). Small enclosures and tall hedges provide sheltered conditions that are ideal for many species of invertebrate. Butterflies are well represented with marbled white (Melanargia galathea), purple hairstreak (Quercusia quercus), brown argus (Aricia agestis) and grayling (Hipparchia semele). General access is only via the one footpath across the site.
Shapwick Heath		Somerset	509 hectares (1,258 acres)	Shapwick; 51.159°N 2.814°W; ST436400	Map	Details	Shapwick Heath is a biological Site of Special Scientific Interest and national nature reserve between Shapwick and Westhay. It is part of the Brue Valley Living Landscape conservation project. Shapwick Heath, part of the Avalon Marshes in the Somerset Levels Wetlands, and managed as a national nature reserve by Natural England, is a former raised bog lying in the basin of the River Brue. The site supports a diverse community of terrestrial and aquatic invertebrates. National rarities are the greater silver diving beetle (Hydrophilus piceus) and the lesser silver diving beetle (Hydrochara caraboides) which is now confined nationally to the Brue Basin Peat Moors.
Somerset Levels		Somerset	463 hectares (1,144 acres)	Moorlinch; 51.121°N 2.882°W; ST383361	Map	Details	The Somerset Levels national nature reserve covers several areas of the wider Somerset Levels. The specific sites include the Moorlinch SSSI, Southlake Moor and part of King's Sedgemoor. The habitats covered are open water and lowland grassland which are frequented by resident and visiting birds. The water table is high for most of the year with frequent winter flooding from high ground and surface water remaining on many fields throughout the winter and early spring. Moorlinch contains a good proportion of botanically rich ditch systems. Public access is restricted.
Tarr Steps Woodland		Somerset	33.4 hectares (82.5 acres)	Winsford; 51.077°N 3.618°W; SS863324	Map	Details	Owned by Exmoor National Park Authority, Tarr Steps Woodland national nature reserve covers 33 hectares of the River Barle valley. This is mainly sessile oak (Quercus petraea) woodland, with beech (Fagus), ash, sycamore (Acer pseudoplatanus), hazel (Corylus), blackberry (Rubus), bluebells (Hyacinthoides non-scripta) and honeysuckle (Lonicera). It is internationally significant for the mosses, liverworts and lichens which flourish in the cool damp conditions. Much of the woodland was once coppiced, primarily to provide charcoal for the local iron smelting industry. The river and the valley woodlands are part of the Barle Valley Site of Special Scientific Interest and abound with wildlife, ranging from red deer to dormice, including the rare barbastelle bat (Barbastella barbastellus) and otter that feed along the unpolluted and fast-flowing river.
Westhay Moor		Somerset	105 hectares (259 acres)	Meare; 51.197°N 2.781°W; ST454443	Map	Details	Westhay Moor is a biological Site of Special Scientific Interest and notified as part of the Somerset Levels and Moors Special Protection Area under the EU Birds Directive and as a Ramsar Site. The low-lying swampy area of Westhay Moor has had peat laid down over older rocks for the last 10,000 years. Peat extraction on the Somerset Levels has occurred since the area was first drained by the Romans. Measures to improve the drainage were carried out in the Middle Ages largely by Glastonbury Abbey. In the 17th and 18th centuries further drainage work was undertaken including digging a series of rhynes, or ditches and larger drainage canals. Peat extraction peaked in the 1960s but has since declined. The geology of the moor and prolonged peat extraction has provided a unique environment which provides a habitat for a range of flora and fauna. Much of the nature reserve managed by the Somerset Wildlife Trust is based around abandoned peatworkings which have now become flooded. It is particularly noted for the millions of starlings which congregate at the site.

== See also ==
- National nature reserves in England
- Nature reserves in Nailsea
- List of local nature reserves in Somerset
- List of Sites of Special Scientific Interest in Somerset
