= Coker, Somerset =

Coker, Somerset may refer to:

- East Coker
- West Coker
