= West Coker =

Village and civil parish in Somerset, England

Coordinates: 50.9189°N 2.6913°W

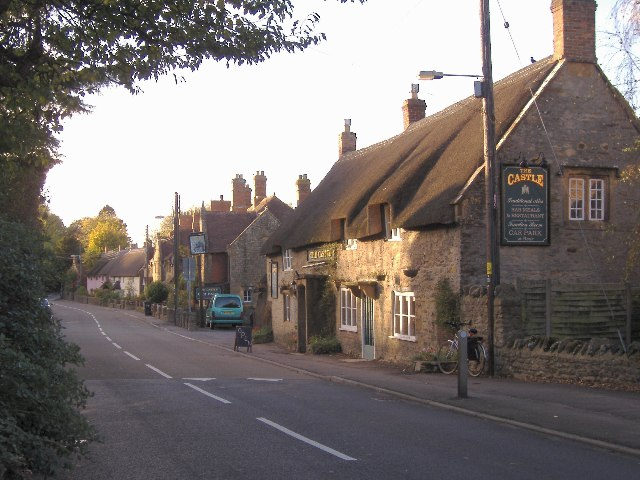
- High Street, West Coker

- Location within Somerset
- Population: 2,828
- OS grid reference: ST515135
- Unitary authority: Somerset Council
- Ceremonial county: Somerset
- Region: South West
- Country: England
- Sovereign state: United Kingdom
- Post town: YEOVIL
- Postcode district: BA22
- Dialling code: 01935
- Police: Avon and Somerset
- Fire: Devon and Somerset
- Ambulance: South Western
- UK Parliament: Yeovil

West Coker is a large village and civil parish in Somerset, England, situated 3 miles (4.8 km) south west of Yeovil.

== History ==
The name Coker comes from Coker Water ("crooked stream" from the Celtic Kukro).

Artifacts from early settlement in the parish include a polished stone axe and boat shaped-bronze brooch. A Roman villa has been excavated and a bronze plate inscribed to the god Mars discovered. From this Mars was given the title Mars Rigisamus (which means "greatest king" or "king of kings") as it depicts a standing naked male figure with a close-fitting helmet; his right hand may have once held a weapon, and he probably originally also had a shield (both are now lost). The same epithet for a god is recorded from Bourges in Gaul. The use of this epithet implies that Mars had an extremely high status, over and above his warrior function.

The manor descended with its neighbour East Coker until the 14th century when it passed to a junior branch of the Courtenay family. It was later held by the Dukes of Somerset and Northumberland protectors of Edward VI and later still by the Portmans of Orchard Portman.

The original manor house burned down during an attack in the Wars of the Roses, although the current hamstone manor house has medieval origins, the earliest surviving portions probably being of around 1500. It is a grade I listed building.

The village had a long history of growing hemp and flax for sailcloth manufacture, which made "Coker Canvas" highly prized by naval captains during the Napoleonic Wars. Dawe's Twineworks, a late 19th-century historic building in the village used for the manufacture of rope and twine, was a featured candidate on the BBC Restoration TV series in 2006. The ropewalk was on the Heritage at Risk Register until local volunteers formed the Coker Rope & Sail Trust and raised substantial funding, including from the National Lottery Heritage Fund. Dawe's Twineworks is now Britain’s only surviving Victorian twineworks with its original working machinery, and is open to visitors on the fourth Saturday of every month.

== Governance ==
The parish council has responsibility for local issues, including setting an annual precept (local rate) to cover the council’s operating costs and producing annual accounts for public scrutiny. The parish council evaluates local planning applications and works with the local police, district council officers, and neighbourhood watch groups on matters of crime, security, and traffic. The parish council's role also includes initiating projects for the maintenance and repair of parish facilities, as well as consulting with the district council on the maintenance, repair, and improvement of highways, drainage, footpaths, public transport, and street cleaning. Conservation matters (including trees and listed buildings) and environmental issues are also the responsibility of the council. The Parish Council also looks after the recreation ground which has a pavilion, a tennis court, cricket pitches, children's sports areas and the Scouts and Guides buildings.

For local government purposes, since 1 April 2023, the parish comes under the unitary authority of Somerset Council. Prior to this, it was part of the non-metropolitan district of South Somerset (established under the Local Government Act 1972). It was part of Yeovil Rural District before 1974.

The village is in 'Coker' electoral ward. The wards stretches from Odcombe in the north west to Barwick in the north east and Hardington Mandeville in the south west. The population of the ward at the 2011 census was 5,310.

It is also part of the Yeovil county constituency represented in the House of Commons of the Parliament of the United Kingdom. It elects one Member of Parliament (MP) by the first past the post system of election.

== Geography ==
Nearby is the Hardington Moor Site of Special Scientific Interest and national nature reserve where meadows are examples of species-rich unimproved neutral grassland, which is now nationally rare. The rare French oat-grass is very abundant on the site and the fields are home to a wide variety of plant species, most notably adder's tongue, corky-fruited water-dropwort and large numbers of green-winged orchid. Invertebrates found at the site include butterflies such as gatekeeper, small tortoiseshell and common blue. Less commonly seen are large skipper, green-veined white and green hairstreak.

== Transport ==
The parish has no railway station, the nearest being Yeovil Junction on the West of England line. There are a few bus routes: the main ones are: Route CR6 (First Hampshire & Dorset) Bridport-Yeovil which operates three journeys a day Monday to Friday, and Route 96 which run approximately every 90 minutes on weekdays (South West Coaches) Chard/Crewkerne-Yeovil.

== Village features and services ==
* Education: West Coker Primary School serves the local community with a student population of roughly 30 pupils. *

Community Spaces: The West Coker Village Hall, administered by the West Coker Commemoration Fund charity, provides a venue for a variety of events. Additionally, the Queen Elizabeth II Jubilee Pavilion, opened in November 2022 at the Recreation Ground on Halves Lane, offers a space for sports and community activities.

Media: The village benefits from a regular community publication, the Ropewalker, which keeps residents informed of local news and events.

Points of Interest:

* Dawe's Twineworks: This museum preserves the history of rope and twine production in West Coker, featuring working machinery and interactive exhibits.

* Hatherstone Wood: This small woodland was developed in 1999 as part of the Woodland Trust's "woodland on your doorstep" scheme.

* West Coker Fen: A designated nature reserve, West Coker Fen provides habitat for a diverse range of flora and fauna, including rare orchids and wetland birds. It is a popular destination for nature enthusiasts and walkers.

== Literary Reference ==
West Coker is Thomas Hardy's Narrowbourne, and features in the story A Tragedy of Two Ambitions in his collection Life's Little Ironies published in 1894.

== Religious sites ==
The Church of Saint Martin of Tours has 13th- or 14th-century origins but was mostly rebuilt in 1863-64. Within the church is a quarter of the carpet used at the Coronation of Queen Elizabeth II.

== Notable people ==
- Lieutenant-Colonel Sir Matthew Nathan, GCMG (1862–1939) a British soldier and civil servant, who variously served as the governor of Sierra Leone, Gold Coast, Hong Kong, Natal and Queensland, died in the village.
- Lee Collins (1988-2021), professional footballer, notably for Port Vale and latterly captain of Yeovil Town died staying at the Lanes Hotel in the village.

== See also ==
- East Coker
