= Hardington Moor =

Nature reserve in Somerset, England

- Site of Special Scientific Interest
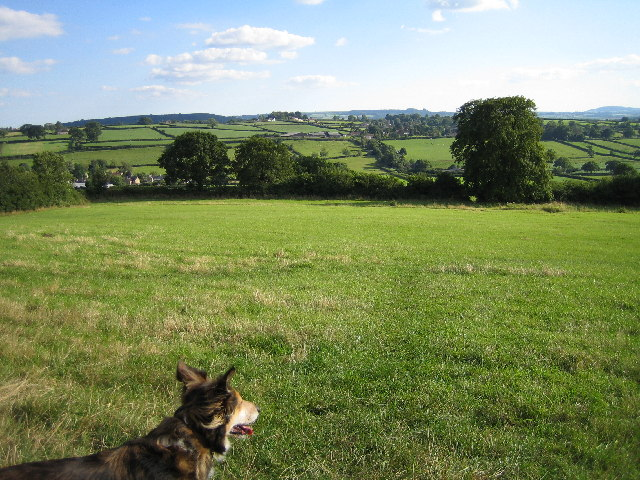

- Location within Somerset
- Location of Hardington Moor.
- Area of search: Somerset
- Grid reference: ST515130
- Coordinates: 50.91441°N 2.69127°W
- Interest: Biological
- Area: 8.7 hectares (0.087 km^{2}; 0.034 sq mi)
- Notification date: 1994

Hardington Moor (grid reference ST515130) is an 8.7 hectare biological Site of Special Scientific Interest between Hardington Mandeville and West Coker in Somerset, notified in 1994.

Hardington Moor National Nature Reserve covers partly calcareous clay-rich soils on sloping ground and comprises three meadows surrounded by established hedges. The meadows are examples of species-rich unimproved neutral grassland, which is now nationally rare. The rare French oat-grass is very abundant on the site and the fields are home to a wide variety of plant species, most notably adder's tongue, corky-fruited water-dropwort and large numbers of green-winged orchid. Invertebrates found at the site include butterflies such as gatekeeper, small tortoiseshell and common blue. Less commonly seen are large skipper, green-veined white and green hairstreak.

== Sources ==
- English Nature citation sheet for the site (accessed 9 August 2006)
