= Nature reserves in Nailsea =

Environmentally protected areas in Somerset, England

There are several nature reserves in the surroundings of Nailsea, North Somerset, England, which is located at 51°25′55″N 2°45′49″W.

== Moorend Spout ==
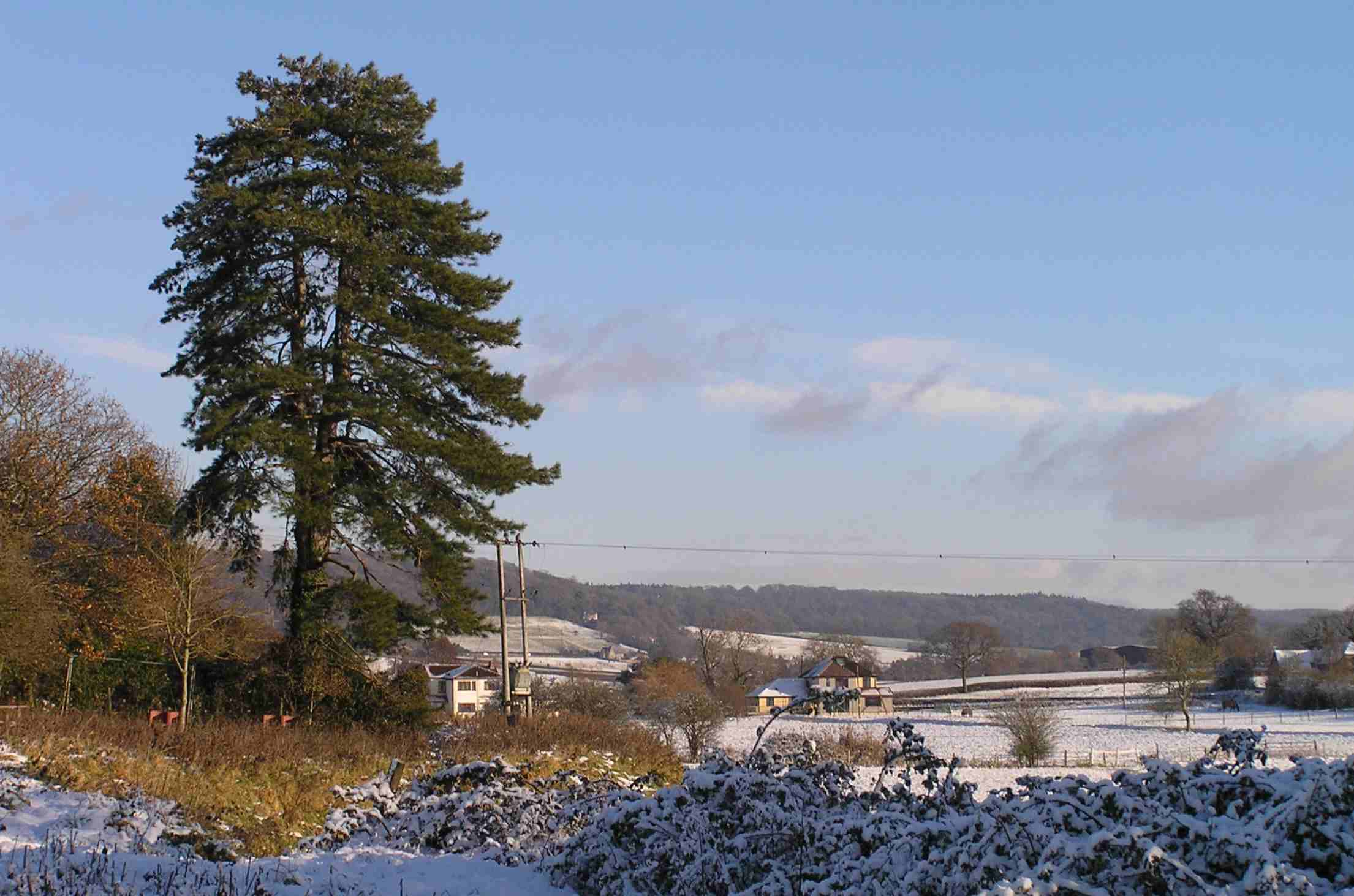
Moorend Spout in snow, January 2011

Moorend Spout lies on six acres of land between Tickenham and Nailsea (ST466715), which was purchased in 2009 with a grant provided by the Landfill Communities Fund. The site comprises wet meadow lying between the rivers Land Yeo and Middle Yeo. Many springs arise in the Alder carr, and a waterfall flows under a bridge carrying the public footpath. Wetland habitats like this are rapidly being lost in the UK. This area is low lying and waterlogged, and traversed by a well-used public footpath. It is now owned and managed by a charitable trust (Nailsea Environment & Wildlife Trust; NEWT). The trustees are hoping to restore the orchids that grew there only a short time ago. Many insects, including dragonflies and damselflies, are present, together with kingfishers and otters.

== Netcott’s Meadow ==
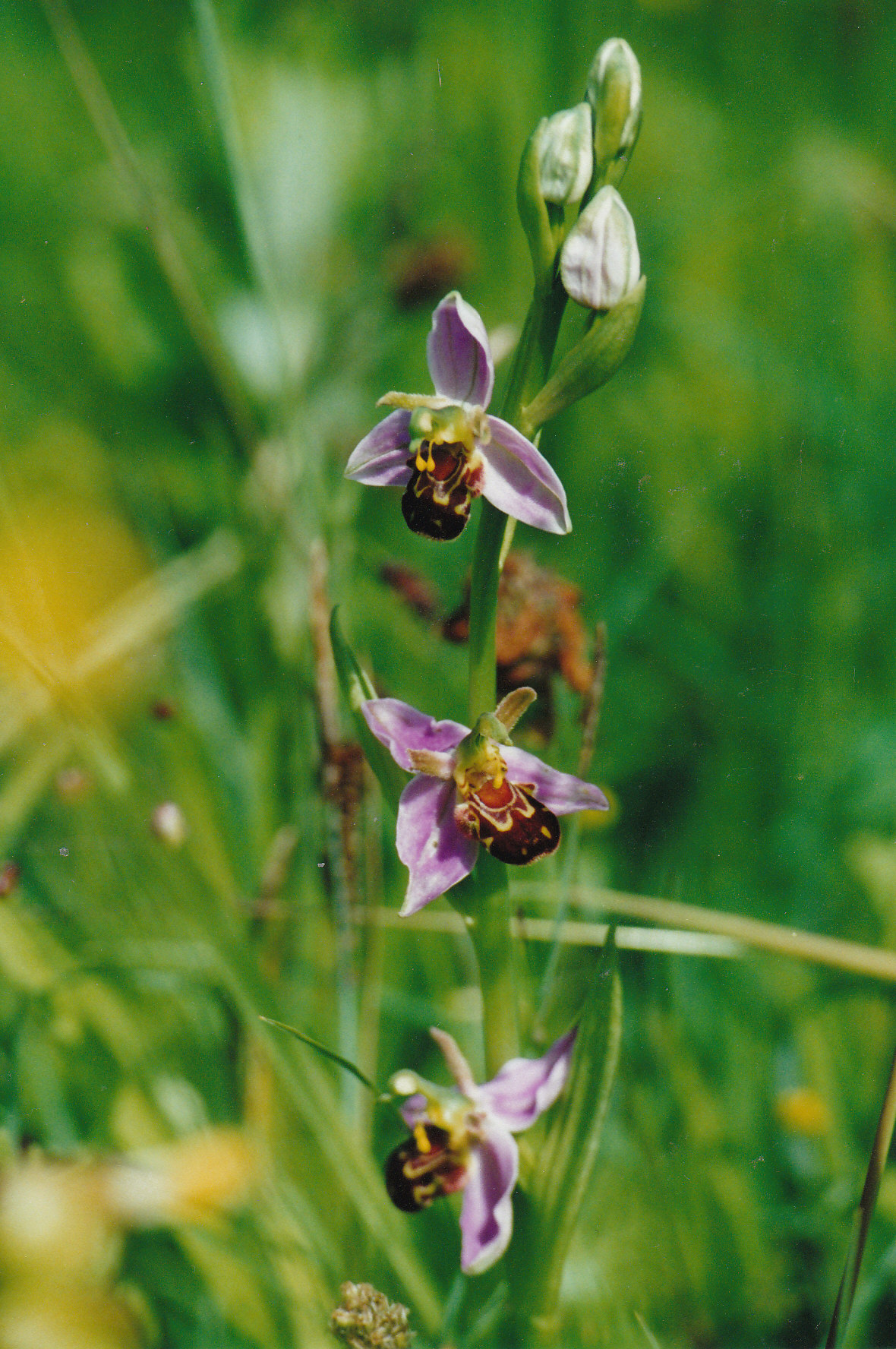
Bee orchids at Netcott's Meadow, June 2000

Netcott’s Meadow is a small area of damp grassland to the North of Backwell Lake (ST476695). It was managed by the Avon Wildlife Trust but owned privately. It is no longer accessible to the public. It has abundant wild flowers best seen in early June. Several species of orchids grow here, including the common spotted orchid (Dactylorhiza fuchsii), southern marsh orchid (Dactylorhiza praetermissa) and green-winged orchid (Orchis morio), and in some years there are many bee orchids (Ophrys apifera), although these may be absent at other times. Yellow rattle (Rhinanthus minor) also grows here, a plant that is parasitic on various grasses and other plants, which has seeds that rattle when shaken, as its name implies.

== Stockway North Nature Reserve ==
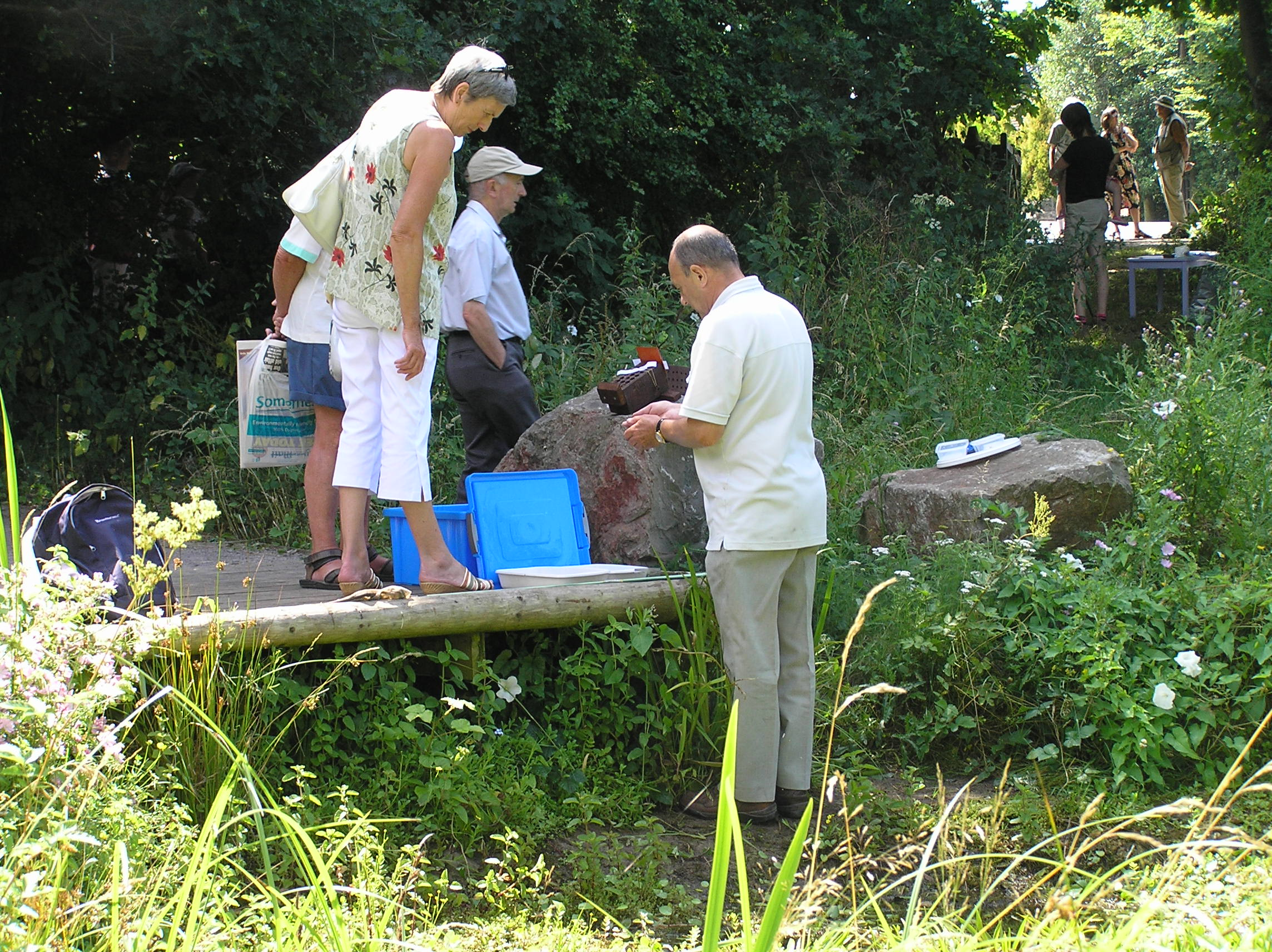
Open day at Stockway North Nature Reserve

Stockway North Nature Reserve is in the 19th century Pennant Sandstone quarries behind the Garden of Rest and occupy about 0.75 acres in the centre of Nailsea (ST472708). After being filled with domestic refuse in the early 20th century, these were neglected, and with natural regeneration it was occupied by local wildlife. Work to restore the site started in 1996, when much of the urban rubbish was removed. With financial assistance from Nailsea Town Council and North Somerset Council, a group – The Friends of Stockway North Nature Reserve – was formed in 1998 to manage this land, involving the community in a project to encourage the wildlife, to raise awareness of the public to the natural environment, as a teaching resource for schools, and as an extension to the adjacent Garden of Rest.

== Backwell Lake ==
Backwell Lake(ST478694, also known as Bucklands Pool) was constructed by Wessex Water and came into use in 1978 as a balancing pond to control the surface water between the Weston-super-Mare to Bristol railway line and the new estates built to the south of Nailsea, preventing the flooding of the River Kenn. The lake is quite shallow, being at most about 2 metres deep and occupies an area of about 4 hectares. It is now a significant wildlife site, designated as a Local Nature Reserve that attracts many water birds. The Lake is open to the public, but fishing is restricted. It is used by many people for walking, dog exercise, bird watching and fishing.

== Jubilee Stone Wood and Badgers Wood Nature Reserves ==
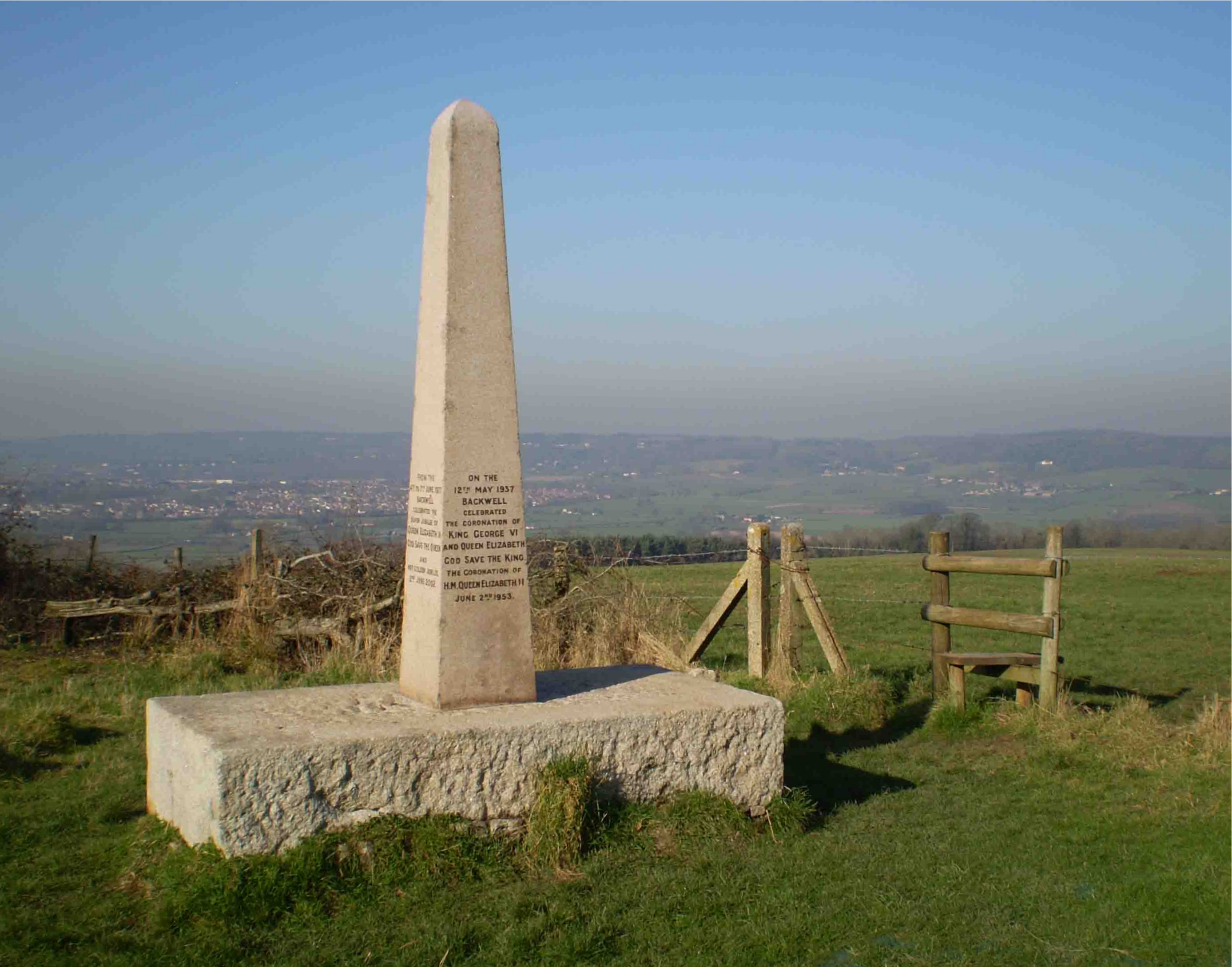
Jubilee Stone, Backwell

Jubilee Stone Wood and Badgers Wood Nature Reserves (ST495679) are primarily broadleaf woodland with open areas of limestone grassland. Both reserves are located high above the historic village of Backwell, North Somerset. They are home to many rare species, including the hazel dormouse, greater horseshoe bat and the yellow birds-nest plant (Monotropa hypopitys). They also have some fascinating archaeology dating back over 5000 years with an adjacent Neolithic human burial cave, a 14th-century rabbit warren and cottage, 17th-century lead mines and a 19th-century limekiln.

== Nowhere Wood ==
Nowhere Wood is a small wood, also known as Trendlewood (ST480703). The name Trendlewood appears to mean 'round wood' and the name Nowhere Wood is derived from a small hamlet linked to the village by Nowhere Lane that still runs through the wood. The wood contains several Pennant Sandstone quarries, abandoned about 1900. The trees and shrubs have grown to cover the spoil heaps, and vegetation overhangs the rock face. Squirrels have built their dreys in the trees and at dusk the bats come out to forage. A group, The Friends of Trendlewood Park, has now been established to restore the wood, the surrounding parkland and meadows and to encourage the wildlife.

== Tyntesfield ==
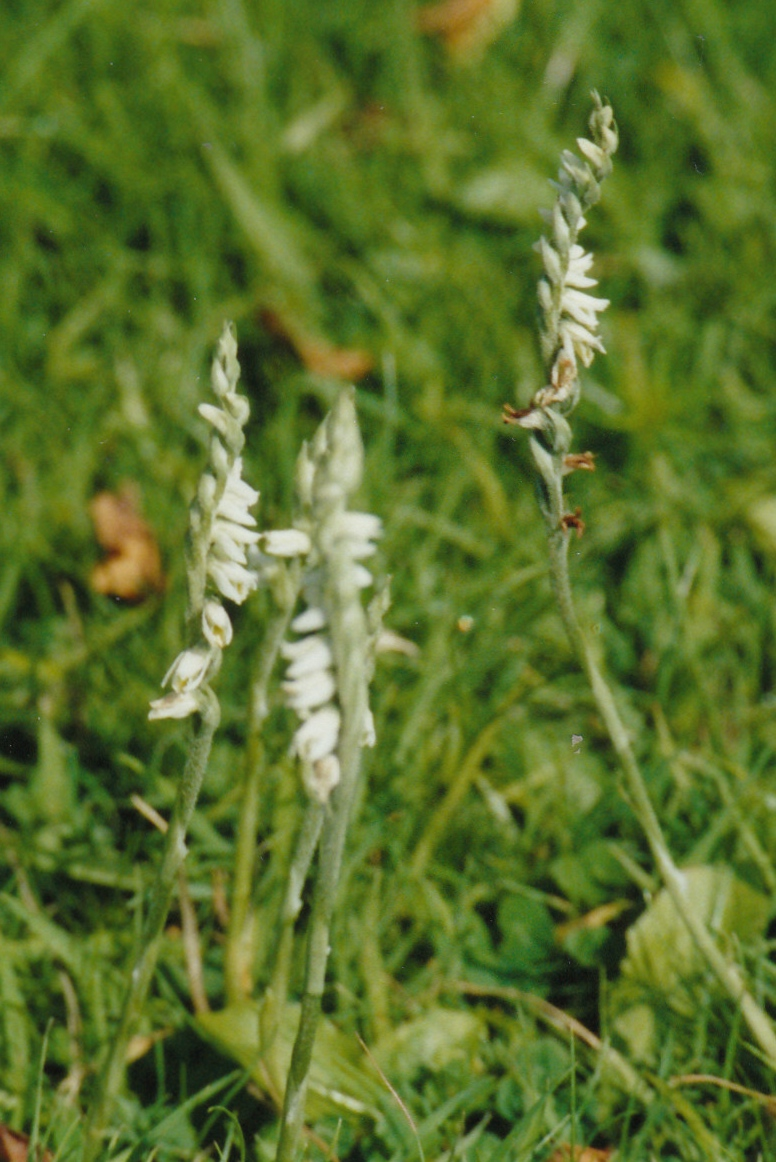
Ladies tresses orchid in Tyntesfield lawn Sept 2004

Tyntesfield (ST505712), formerly the home of the Gibbs family, came on to the market in 2002 and was acquired by the National Trust with assistance from the National Heritage Memorial Fund and many local private benefactors. It is surrounded by 200 Ha of gardens, farmland and unspoilt woodland. Much of this still remains to be explored, though it is clear that there is considerable potential for wildlife. The buildings contain several bat roosts and eight species of bat are known to live in this area, notably the lesser horseshoe bats (Rhinolophus hipposideros), which roost in the courtyard. Over 90 individuals of this endangered species have been counted there. Other bat species found include the greater horseshoe bat (Rhinolophus ferrumequinum), brown long-eared bat (Plecotus auritus), and serotine bat (Eptesicus serotinus), whiskered bat (Myotis sp), and the two pipistrelle species, (Pipistrellus pipistrellus and P. pygmaeus). The female glow worm (Lampyris noctiluca) may be seen on a warm June night in the area close to the house at Tyntesfield. These beetles are in rapid decline, probably due to the increase in urban lights that may distract the males. Their food is mainly snails and slugs, which are in plentiful supply in this area. The orchid Autumn Ladies Tresses (Spiranthes spiralis) grows in the lawn outside the main house.

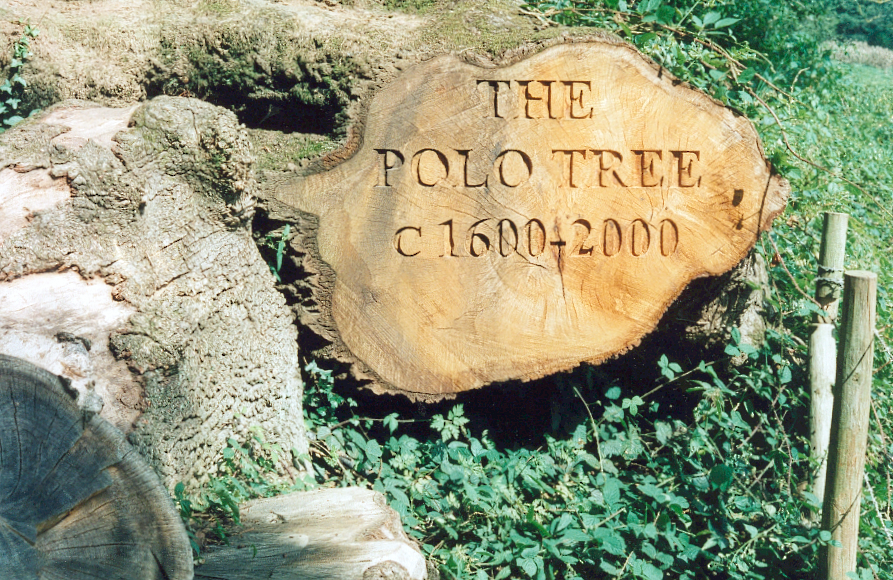
Polo-oak seat in Towerhouse Wood

== Towerhouse Wood ==
Towerhouse Wood (ST475719) is a site of semi-natural ancient woodland about 1 km to the north of Nailsea owned by The Woodland Trust which is famous for its bluebells, veteran Oaks and for its pond, which is constantly producing bubbles of gas. The Wood is being invaded by alien trees and shrubs that could overwhelm our native plants if they are not controlled. A large variety of wild animals are found in the wood, now including dormice, rabbits, roe deer, badgers, grey squirrels, and five species of bat. A lime kiln marked on a map dated 1769 is found on private land in the NW corner of the wood. To the south of the Wood there is a Mesolithic site first studied in 1956 which yielded many worked flints.

== St George’s Flower Bank ==
St George’s Flower Bank (ST 507753), which is adjacent to the main Portishead to Bristol road (A369), is owned by North Somerset Council and managed by volunteers. Seeds that lay dormant in the 'seed-bank' until the soil was disturbed, produced wildflowers that have become rare in other places. The site is managed as a traditional hay meadow, scything, and removing the grass in late July. Scrub and trees that normally cover roadsides are kept in check, and this management has produced a site that has now been officially designated as a Local Nature Reserve.

== See also ==
- List of local nature reserves in Somerset
