= List of local nature reserves in Somerset =

The ceremonial county of Somerset consists of three unitary authorities, Somerset (administered by Somerset Council), North Somerset and Bath and North East Somerset.

Local nature reserves (LNRs) are designated by local authorities under the National Parks and Access to the Countryside Act 1949. The local authority must have a legal control over the site, by owning or leasing it or having an agreement with the owner. LNRs are sites which have a special local interest either biologically or geologically, and local authorities have a duty to care for them. They can apply local bye-laws to manage and protect LNRs.

There are 40 local nature reserves in Somerset recognised by Natural England. The smallest is Wellington Basins, which covers 0.53 hectares (1.3 acres) of small ponds and surrounding grassland and woodland. This provides a habitat for grey wagtail, dipper and reed bunting. The largest, covering 129.56 hectares (320.1 acres), is Weston Woods on Worlebury Hill, which includes Worlebury Camp Iron Age hill fort. The woodland provides a habitat for mammals including deer, badgers, foxes and bats. Birds include woodpeckers, buzzards and treecreepers. Several of the sites are Sites of Special Scientific Interest (SSSI). The list includes sites owned or managed by both Avon Wildlife Trust and Somerset Wildlife Trust.

== Sites ==
Site	Photograph	Area (Note: Unless otherwise stated, the area is taken from the Natural England map of each site. (Click on the identify icon (i) in the "Feature Tools" and then click on the site.))	Location (Note: The location is taken from the Natural England details page for the site.)	Map (Note: The maps are on the Natural England database of Local Nature Reserves.)	Details (Note: Details are on the pages on each site in the Natural England database of Local Nature Reserves.)	Description
Ash Priors Common		20.78 hectares (51.3 acres)	Ash Priors; 51.0527°N 3.2105°W; ST152288	Map	Details	This reserve covers unimproved neutral grassland, semi-natural deciduous woodland, wet heath, scrub, carr, stream, ponds and hedgerows. The plants to be found at the site include early marsh-orchid and twayblade orchid while the animals include the eurasian harvest mouse, viviparous lizard and tree pipit. It was the first and is the largest local nature reserve run by Taunton Deane Borough Council.
Berrow Dunes		16.7 hectares (41 acres)	Berrow; 51.2776°N 3.0157°W; ST292536	Map	Details	The dunes, west of the village of Berrow, have a golf course, and is a noted site for various unusual plants, including a strong colony of lizard orchids. A 200 hectares (490 acres) area, which includes the reserve, was designated in 1952 as a SSSI. Berrow Marsh, contained within the dunes between the village and the beach, is a mixture of reedbed and salt marsh. Birds found here include many wetland species such as reed and sedge warbler and in winter occasional jack snipe among large numbers of common snipe.
Bickenhall Orchard	–	0.6 hectares (1.5 acres)	Bickenhall; 50.9603°N 3.0045°W; ST295183	Map	Details	Apple trees with mistletoe in a grass orchard with herbs and orchids.
Bincombe Beeches		5.36 hectares (13.2 acres)	Crewkerne; 50.8872°N 2.7925°W; ST443100	Map	Details	The site has beech trees up to 200 years old, oaks and hazels. Birds include blackbirds, woodpeckers, goldcrests and jackdaws, and there are small mammals such as badgers and foxes.
Bucklands Pool/Backwell Lake		5.52 hectares (13.6 acres)	Backwell; 51.4216°N 2.7528°W; ST477694	Map	Details	The lake, which is also known as Buckland's Pool is next to the road between Nailsea and Backwell at Buckland's Batch. The lake was built as a balancing pond in the mid-1970s. It has now become a wildlife haven for birds, bats and dragonflies, which are attracted by the open water and surrounding vegetation. Bird species include gadwall, shoveler, pochard, tufted duck, grey heron and mute swans.
Cadbury Hill/Henley Quarry		20.84 hectares (51.5 acres)	Yatton; 51.3817°N 2.8039°W; ST441650	Map	Details	This site comprises ancient semi-natural woodland, scrub and unimproved grassland. Species of interest include marsh tit, noctule bat, slow worm, wood anemone, bluebell, betony, small scabious, rock rose and small leaved lime. On the northern limestone slope grow hundreds of common spotted orchids. The Iron Age hill fort has many ant hills, which are visited by green woodpeckers. The grassy plateau of the hill fort is owned and managed by Yatton and Congresbury Parish Councils.
Camerton Batch		2.02 hectares (5.0 acres)	Camerton; 51.3198°N 2.4570°W; ST682579	Map	Details	The spoil heap or batch is a result of coal mining on the Somerset Coalfield in the 19th century. Camerton New Pit survived to be nationalised, eventually closing in 1950. In the centre of the village is Camerton Batch which is now covered with conifer. It is important for geology.
Carrs Woodland		21.1 hectares (52 acres)	Twerton; 51.3847°N 2.4073°W; ST717651	Map	Detail	A woodland area in the valley of Newton Brook. Plants include the bath asparagus.
Chard Reservoir		37.05 hectares (91.6 acres)	Chard; 50.8844°N 2.9428°W; ST338098	Map	Detail	A 36.97-hectare (91.4-acre) reservoir which is owned and managed by South Somerset District Council. It is a recipient of the Green Flag Award. The reservoir was built on the river Isle in 1842 to provide water for the Chard Canal which closed in 1868. The site is used for dog walking, fishing and birdwatching, with a bird hide having been installed. Birds which are spotted regularly include herons, egrets, kingfishers, cormorants, grebes, gulls, ducks and also a wide range of woodland birds including nuthatch, treecreeper and woodpeckers. Rarities have included ring-necked duck, great white egret, cattle egret and yellow-browed warbler. The water is stocked with carp.
Cheddar Valley Railway Walk		28.6 hectares (71 acres)	Yatton to Winscombe; 51.3456°N 2.8334°W; ST420610	Map	Detail	Following the route of the Cheddar Valley Line, this linear reserve passes through the Biddle Street SSSI. The site supports birds, bats, amphibians and reptiles.
Children's Wood/Riverside		19.53 hectares (48.3 acres)	Taunton; 51.0252°N 3.0800°W; ST243256	Map	Detail	Alongside the River Tone, this reserve provides a habitat corridor for animals. Birds recorded include the kingfisher and grey wagtail. The site is also important for butterflies, dragonflies and damselflies.
Church and Wains Hill (Poets Walk)		8.95 hectares (22.1 acres)	Clevedon; 51.4325°N 2.8724°W; ST394707	Map	Detail	This reserve includes a hill fort dating from the Iron Age on Wain's Hill and Church Hill. It has calcareous grassland, coastal scrub and woodland.
Eastfield, Sedgemoor Hill		7.42 hectares (18.3 acres)	High Ham; 51.0715°N 2.8042°W; ST437305	Map	Detail	Grassland with orchids and butterflies.
Eastwood and Battery Point		11.68 hectares (28.9 acres)	Portishead; 51.4944°N 2.7670°W; ST468775	Map	Detail	The Eastwood area is broadleaf woodland on a coastal limestone ridge which leads to Battery Point which had a defensive gun position and Portishead Point Lighthouse is on the promontory. There is also geological interest in the fossils, folds and faults found in the area.
Felton Common		40.37 hectares (99.8 acres)	Winford; 51.3833°N 2.6947°W; ST517651	Map	Detail	Open calcareous grassland with scrub and bracken. There are birds including kestrel, sky lark, song thrush, willow warbler, spotted flycatcher and several species of invertebrates.
Folly Farm		98.49 hectares (243.4 acres)	Stowey; 51.3427°N 2.5649°W; ST607605	Map	Detail	Folly Farm is a traditionally managed visitable farm and nature reserve run by the Avon Wildlife Trust. The farmhouse is 17th century and the surrounding land includes neutral grassland, flowery meadows and woodlands. The 250 acres (100 ha) nature reserve includes the Folly Oak which is over 400 years old.
Frieze Hill Community Orchard		1.39 hectares (3.4 acres)	Taunton; 51.0239°N 3.1214°W; ST214255	Map	Detail	This site has been converted from allotments to rough grassland and an orchard. The kingston black and yarlington mill varieties of apples are among those grown.
Gadds Valley		3.69 hectares (9.1 acres)	Cheddon Fitzpaine; 51.0565°N 3.0965°W; ST232291	Map	Detail	Open grassland and woodland.
Hurstone Farm Woodlands		9.78 hectares (24.2 acres)	Waterrow; 51.0152°N 3.3507°W; ST053248	Map	Detail	Woodland on the banks of the River Tone. The woodland, hedgerows and open grassland provide a habitat for dormice, otter and several bat species. Bryophyte species include black spleenwort.
Kensington Meadows		2.12 hectares (5.2 acres)	Bath; 51.3921°N 2.3442°W; ST761659	Map	Detail	Mixed woodland and open meadow next to the River Avon.
Manor Road Community Woodland		20.93 hectares (51.7 acres)	Keynsham; 51.4042°N 2.4808°W; ST666673	Map	Detail	Woodland and grassland that supports a range of bird species.
Middle Hill Common		1.49 hectares (3.7 acres)	Weston in Gordano; 51.4672°N 2.7982°W; ST446745	Map	Detail	Grassland and wild flower meadow, which supports invertebrates and butterflies.
Moldrums Ground		2.55 hectares (6.3 acres)	Penselwood; 51.0845°N 2.3562°W; ST751317	Map	Detail	The site includes a dry woodland surrounding unimproved grassland. Ponds on the site provide a habitat for northern crested newt.
Netherclay Community Woodland		3.91 hectares (9.7 acres)	Bishop's Hull; 51.0202°N 3.1341°W; ST205251	Map	Detail	A woodland with oak, ash, black poplar, dogwood and hazel.
Norton Hillfort		2.04 hectares (5.0 acres)	Norton Fitzwarren; 51.0308°N 3.1472°W; ST196263	Map	Detail	The site surrounds the Iron Age hill fort of Norton Camp. It consists of woodland of oak, ash, and sycamore trees with an underlying flora of bluebell, wood anemone and moschatel.
Otterhead Lakes		21.53 hectares (53.2 acres)	Otterford; 50.9171°N 3.1031°W; ST225136	Map	Detail	A pair of reservoirs fed by the River Otter and managed by the Otterhead Estate Trust Company Limited, working with the Somerset Wildlife Trust on behalf of Wessex Water. The lakes are the centrepiece of the one mile long nature reserve. It includes dry woodland which has a ground flora including common bluebell, dogs mercury and twayblade. More moist areas are home to marsh penywart, royal fern rhododendron and sycamore. There are dormice, badgers and bats in the woods and bird species include kingfisher, dipper and wagtail.
Screech Owl		11.7 hectares (29 acres)	Huntworth; 51.1116°N 2.9778°W; ST316351	Map	Detail	A wetland area which supports a variety of birds, bats and small mammals.
Silk Mills Park and Ride		7.08 hectares (17.5 acres)	Taunton; 51.0230°N 3.1270°W; ST210254	Map	Detail	Landscaping and ponds in three areas next to the River Tone created when the park and ride was created. The woodland and grassland supports aquatic and marginal vegetation. There are also a variety of birds, bats, reptiles and invertebrates.
Silver Street		2.12 hectares (5.2 acres)	Midsomer Norton; 51.2810°N 2.4853°W; ST662536	Map	Detail	An ancient woodland, next to Midsomer Norton railway station, including ash, beech, field maple, hazel, hawthorn, oak, holly, sycamore and wild cherry. There is also a pond and some adjacent grassland.
Slader's Leigh		0.66 hectares (1.6 acres)	Winscombe; 51.3024°N 2.8312°W; ST421562	Map	Detail	A wildflower meadow with plants including devil's-bit scabious, cowslip, betony, common spotted orchid and tormentil which provide a habitat for a range of butterflies.
South Taunton Streams (Mill, Galmington, Blackbrook 1&2)		8.24 hectares (20.4 acres)	Taunton; 51.0145°N 3.0741°W; ST247244	Map	Detail	Four sites providing a range of flora which support water voles, otters, kingfisher, sand martin, dippers and bats.
St George's Flower Bank	–	1.48 hectares (3.7 acres)	Easton in Gordano; 51.1509°N 2.7033°W; ST512752	Map	Detail	Flower meadow alongside a main road.
Street Heath		8.18 hectares (20.2 acres)	Glastonbury; 51.4741°N 2.7684°W; ST463393	Map	Detail	The heath is a biological SSSI. The nature reserve is managed by Somerset Wildlife Trust, with examples of plant communities that were once common on the Somerset Levels. It possesses a vegetation consisting of wet and dry heath, species-rich bog and carr woodland, with transitions between all these habitats. Rare ferns present include marsh fern and royal fern. Old peat workings and rhynes have a wetland community which includes bulrush, yellow flag iris, cyperus-like sedge and lesser bur-reed. Insects recorded include 33 species of butterflies, 200 moths and 12 grasshoppers and crickets, with several notable rarities. Birds breeding in the carr woodland include the local willow tit.
Swains	–	0.67 hectares (1.7 acres)	Wellington; 50.9707°N 3.2326°W; ST135197	Map	Detail	A meadow with cuckoo flower, meadowsweet, and dove's-foot crane's-bill. There is also a pond which provides a habitat for amphibians including great crested newt, palmate newt and toad.
Twerton Roundhill		4.66 hectares (11.5 acres)	Twerton; 51.3685°N 2.3971°W; ST724633	Map	Detail	Grassland with a range of wildflowers including greater knapweed and agrimony.
Uphill Hill		17 hectares (42 acres) (Note: The areas of Uphill Hill and Walborough Common are not given by NE as although there are separate information pages for the sites, the map shows them as a single site with an area of 38 hectares. The areas for these sites are based on the Visit Weston-super-Mare site Uphill Local Nature Reserve, which states that Uphill has an area of 17 hectares (42 acres), which leaves 21 hectares (52 acres) for Walborough.)	Uphill; 51.3174°N 2.9821°W; ST316580	Map	Detail	Open grassland around a disused quarry. There are a range of flowers including cowslip, primrose and green-winged orchid. This site is adjacent to Walborough Common and together they cover 38.14 hectares (94.2 acres), which is partly coterminous with Uphill Cliff SSSI.
Walborough Common		21 hectares (52 acres)	Uphill; 51.3174°N 2.9821°W; ST316580	Map	Detail	Salt marsh with sea barley, slender hare's-ear and sea clover and limestone grassland with Somerset hair-grass, honewort, green-winged and early purple orchids. These attract redshank, dunlin, shelduck, black-tailed godwit, skylark, linnet, rock and meadow pipit. This site is adjacent to Uphill Hill and together they cover 38.14 hectares (94.2 acres), which is partly coterminous with Uphill Cliff SSSI.
Weirfield Riverside		0.88 hectares (2.2 acres)	Taunton; 51.0204°N 3.1156°W; ST218251	Map	Detail	A linear nature reserve along the bank of the River Tone providing alder and willow woodland, bramble, scrub and rough grassland. The wetter areas which are sometimes flooded include hemlock water dropwort, and yellow flag.
Wellington Basins		0.53 hectares (1.3 acres)	Wellington; 50.9796°N 3.2399°W; ST130207	Map	Detail	Small ponds and surrounding grassland and woodland which provide a habitat for grey wagtail, dipper and reed bunting.
Weston Woods		129.56 hectares (320.1 acres)	Weston-super-Mare; 51.3598°N 2.9716°W; ST324627	Map	Detail	A wooded area on Worlebury Hill which includes Worlebury Camp Iron Age hill fort. The woodland provides a habitat for mammals including deer, badgers, foxes and bats. Birds include woodpeckers, buzzards and treecreepers.

== See also ==
- List of national nature reserves in Somerset
- List of local nature reserves in England
- List of Sites of Special Scientific Interest in Somerset
