= Weston-Worle Ridge =

Hill range in North Somerset, England

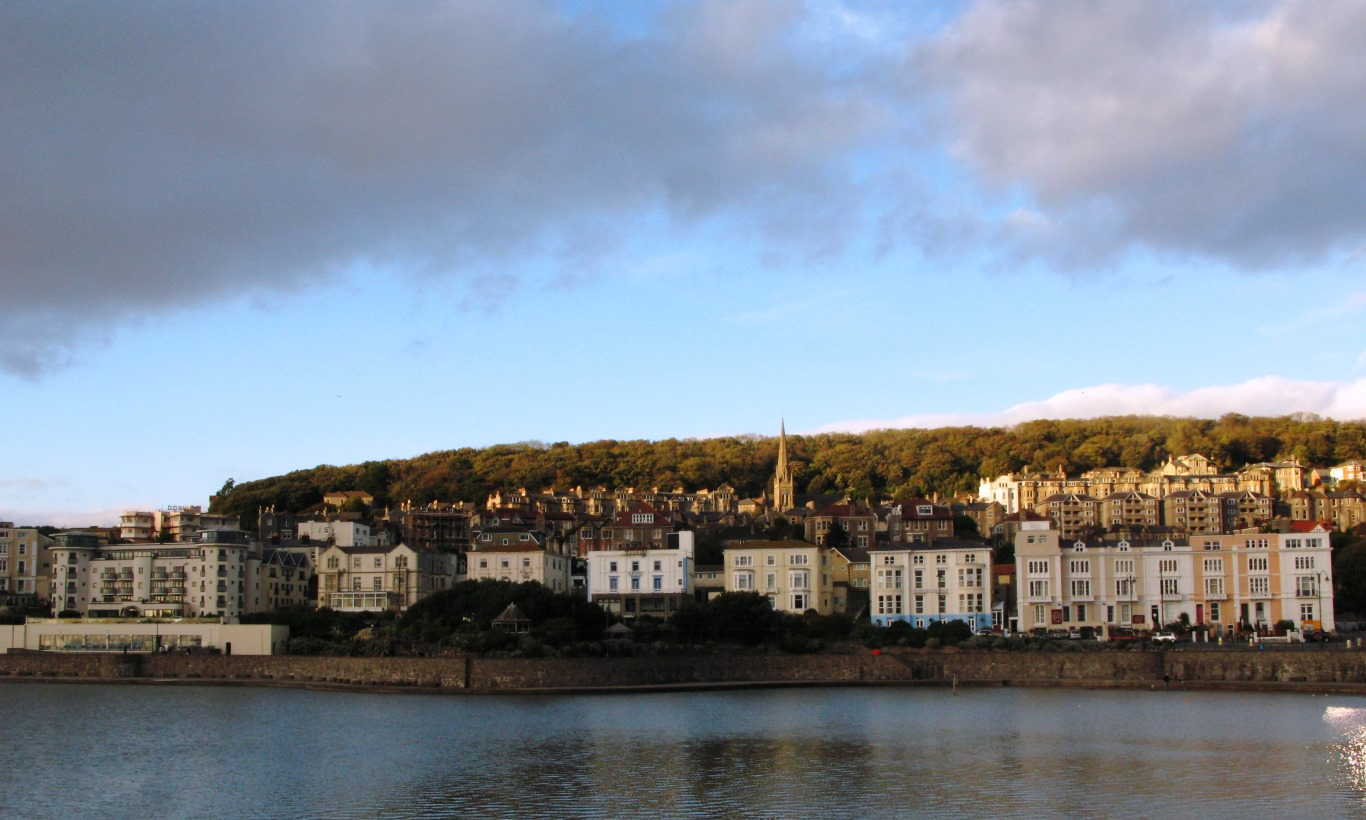
- A view of Worlebury Hill, the western peak.

Geography
- Location: North Somerset, England
- Range coordinates: 51°22′N 2°59′W

Geology
- Mountain type: Hill

The Weston-Worle Ridge is a range of three hills just north of Weston-super-Mare. Going from west to east, these hills are Worlebury Hill, Milton Hill, and Worle Hill.
