= North Exmoor SSSI =

Protected conservation area in England

North Exmoor
- Site of Special Scientific Interest
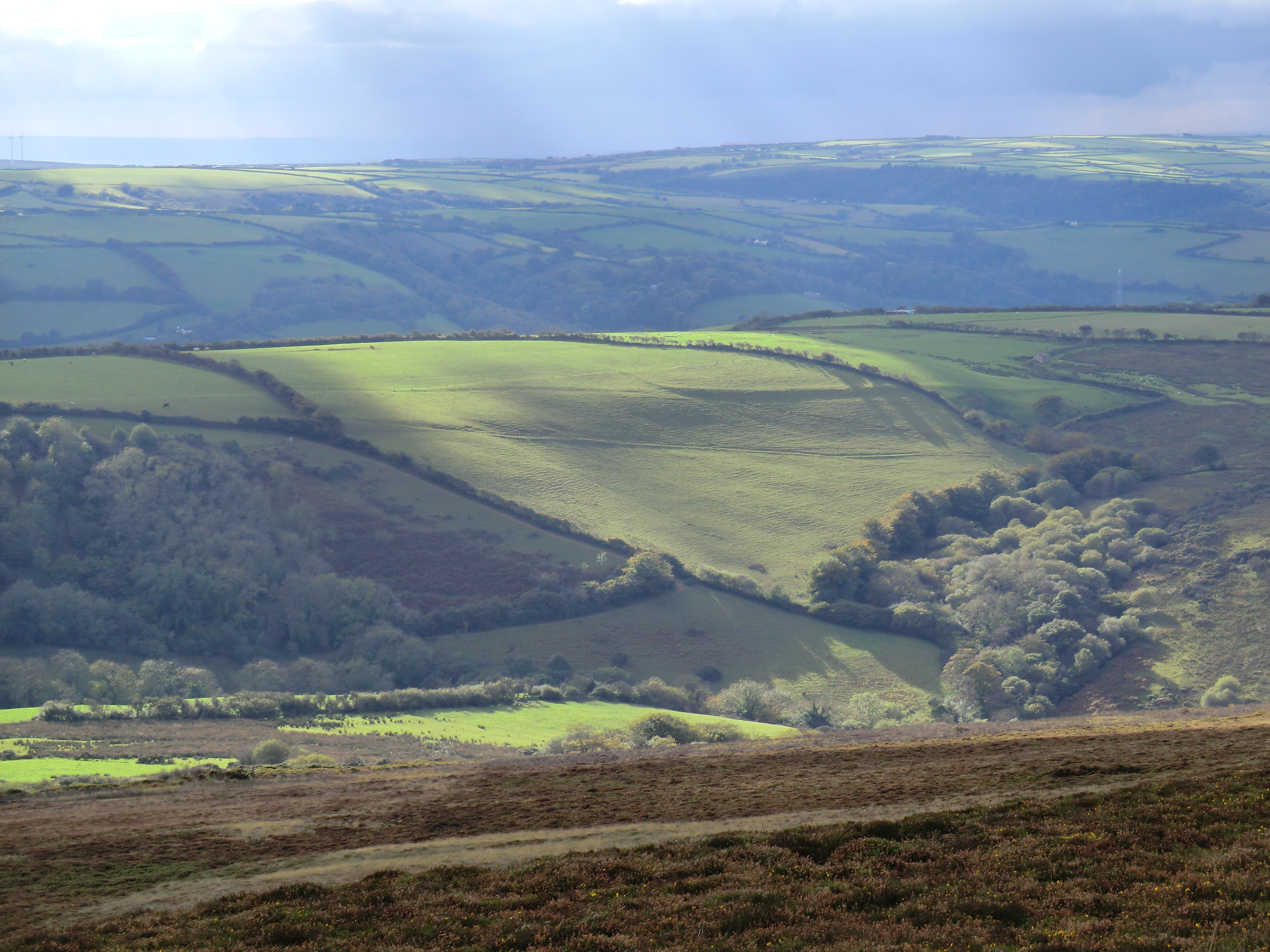

- Location within Somerset
- Location of North Exmoor.
- Area of search: Somerset & Devon
- Grid reference: SS800430
- Coordinates: 51.17361°N 3.71794°W
- Interest: Biological
- Area: 12,005.3 hectares (120.053 km^{2}; 46.353 sq mi)
- Notification date: 1954

North Exmoor (grid reference SS800430) is a 12,005.3-hectare (29,666-acre) biological Site of Special Scientific Interest (SSSI) in Devon and Somerset, notified in 1954.

This site is within Exmoor National Park and includes the Dunkery Beacon and the Holnicote and Horner Water Nature Conservation Review sites, and the Chains Geological Conservation Review site. The site is nationally important for its south-western lowland heath communities and for transitions from ancient semi-natural woodland through upland heath to blanket mire. The site is also of importance for its breeding bird communities, its large population of the nationally rare heath fritillary butterfly (Mellicta athalia), an exceptional woodland lichen flora and its palynological interest of deep peat on the Chains. The ancient woodland is mostly to be found around Horner and Hawkcombe Woods near Porlock where it is open to the moorland and is grazed by domestic stock and red deer (Cervus elaphus) of which there is a large population.

The site has been divided into units, and these are assessed periodically by Natural England, which superseded English Nature in 2006 and is the designated authority for monitoring SSSIs.
