= Hardington Mandeville =

Village and civil parish in Somerset, England

Coordinates: 50.9009°N 2.6910°W

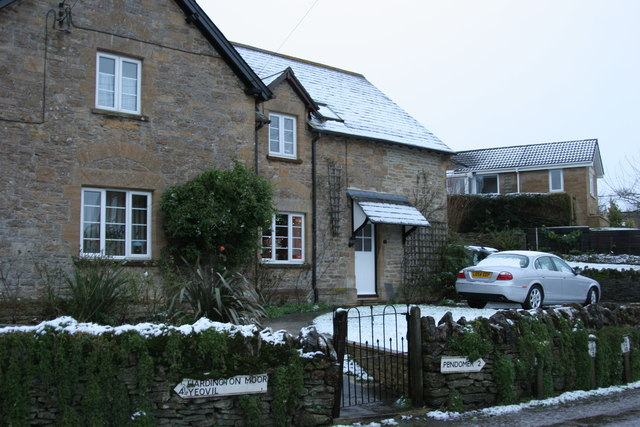
- Broadstone Villas

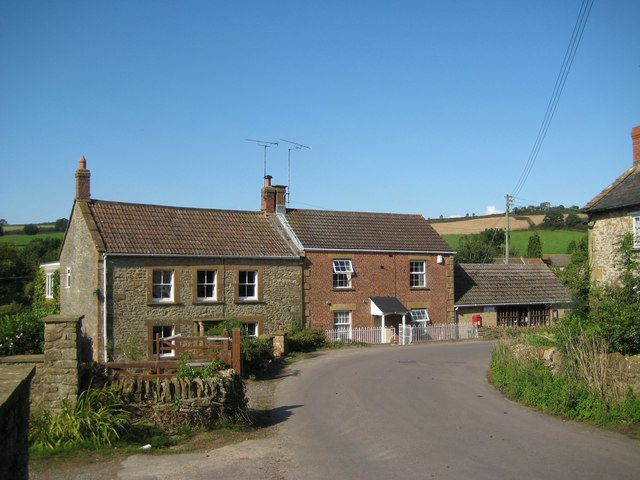
- Hardington Moor

- Location within Somerset
- Population: 585 (2011)
- OS grid reference: ST515115
- Unitary authority: Somerset Council
- Ceremonial county: Somerset
- Region: South West
- Country: England
- Sovereign state: United Kingdom
- Post town: YEOVIL
- Postcode district: BA22
- Dialling code: 01935
- Police: Avon and Somerset
- Fire: Devon and Somerset
- Ambulance: South Western
- UK Parliament: Yeovil

Hardington Mandeville is a village and civil parish in Somerset, England, situated 3 miles (4.8 km) south west of Yeovil. The village has a population of 585.

== History ==
The Hardington part of the name of the village means settlement of Heardred's people.

The manor was held before the Norman Conquest of 1066 by Gunhilda, the daughter of Godwin, Earl of Wessex and then by William the Conqueror. During the 12th century it was granted to the Mandeville family, from which the second part of the name is taken. It was later held by the Portmans of Orchard Portman.

The parish was part of the hundred of Houndsborough.

== Notable people ==
- Local councillor and village resident Cathy Bakewell was made Baroness of Hardington Mandeville in 2013.
- Sir Herbert Bartlett (1842 – 1921), English civil engineer and contractor, was born in Hardington Mandeville.
- Roger Burridge (1957-2020), folk musician, recording artist, and member of Fairport Convention was born at Hill End and lived there until he left school.
- Rev. Henry Holditch Thomas Cleife (1849-1914), author of England's Greatest National Sin: being selections and reflections on our Asiatic opium policy and traffic, and Mutual Recognition in the Life Beyond, was rector 1883-1914.
- Rev. Richard James Hunt (1874-1938), missionary and linguist, author of The Livingstone of South America, was rector 1934-38.
- Harald James Penrose O.B.E. (1904-1996), experimental test pilot, naval architect and aviation author, lived at Broadhill Cottage for the last decade of his life.
- Rev. Canon Leonard Sharland (1904-78), missionary to the Sudan and Canon of Khartoum Cathedral, was rector 1969-76.
- Gilbert Vassall (1876-1941), the top-flight sportsman who excelled at cricket, football, and long jump, was born at Hardington Rectory (now Hardington House).
- Harry Vassall (1860-1926), Oxford and international rugby player, author of Football: the Rugby Game, and a leading figure in rugby's history, spent his childhood at Hardington Rectory (now Hardington House).

== Governance ==
The parish council has responsibility for local issues, including setting an annual precept (local rate) to cover the council's operating costs and producing annual accounts for public scrutiny. The parish council evaluates local planning applications and works with the local police, district council officers, and neighbourhood watch groups on matters of crime, security, and traffic. The parish council's role also includes initiating projects for the maintenance and repair of parish facilities, as well as consulting with the district council on the maintenance, repair, and improvement of highways, drainage, footpaths, public transport, and street cleaning. Conservation matters (including trees and listed buildings) and environmental issues are also the responsibility of the council.

For local government purposes, since 1 April 2023, the parish comes under the unitary authority of Somerset Council. Prior to this, it was part of the non-metropolitan district of South Somerset (established under the Local Government Act 1972). It was part of Yeovil Rural District before 1974.

It is also part of the Yeovil county constituency represented in the House of Commons of the Parliament of the United Kingdom. It elects one Member of Parliament (MP) by the first past the post system of election.

== Geography ==
Nearby is the Hardington Moor biological Site of Special Scientific Interest and National Nature Reserve where the meadows are examples of species-rich unimproved neutral grassland, which is now nationally rare. The rare French oat-grass is very abundant on the site and the fields are home to a wide variety of plant species, most notably adder's tongue, corky-fruited water-dropwort and large numbers of green-winged orchid. Invertebrates found at the site include butterflies such as gatekeeper, small tortoiseshell and common blue. Less commonly seen are large skipper, green-veined white and green hairstreak.

== Religious sites ==
The Church of Saint Mary was rebuilt in 1123 on the site of an earlier church. It has had renovation work in the 15th century and again in 1864. The circular font is thought to be original dating from 1123, and the clock mechanism was built and installed before 1707. There are 6 bells in the tower, 3 of which are from the Purdue (Closworth) foundry, with the earliest being dated 1591. It has been designated as a Grade II* listed building.

Collinson states that, "In this parish are the remains of an ancient chapel of elegant workmanship, converted some time since into a weaving shop."

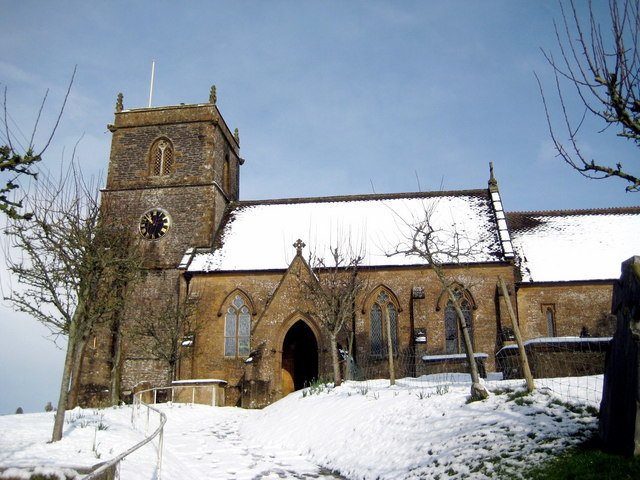
Church of the Blessed Virgin Mary

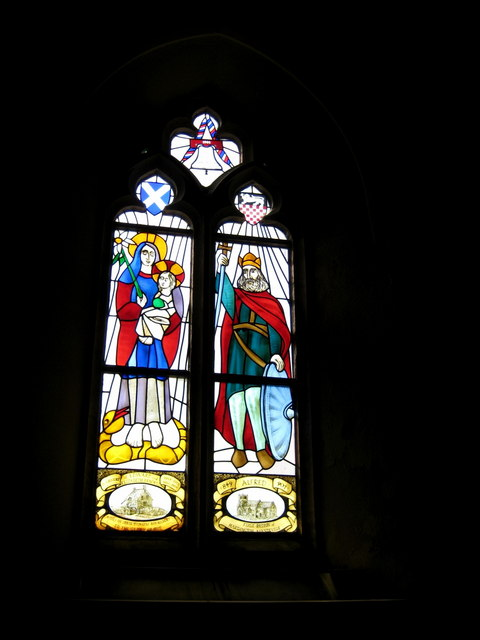
Memorial window - St Mary's
