= Hawkcombe Woods =

Nature reserve in Somerset, England

Coordinates: 51°12′06″N 3°35′36″W

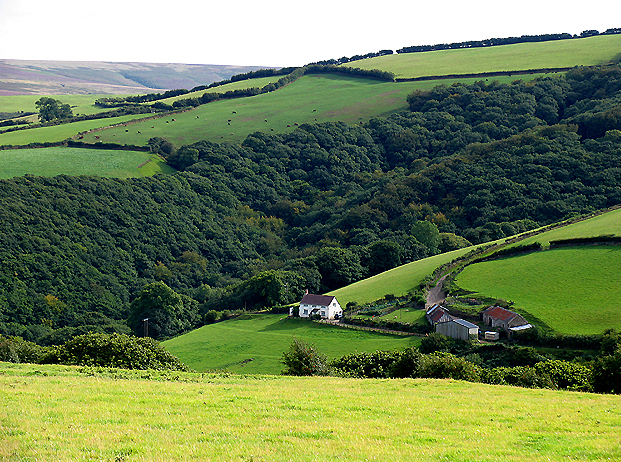
The western end of Hawkcombe Woods

Hawkcombe Woods is a national nature reserve near Porlock on Exmoor, Somerset, England.

The 101 hectares (250 acres) woodlands are notable for their lichens, heath fritillary butterfly, red wood ant colonies, dead wood invertebrates and ancient pollards.

They are part of the North Exmoor Site of Special Scientific Interest.

== Hawkcombe head ==
Hawkcombe head is a Mesolithic flint working site. Radiocarbon dating of flint tools and charcoal shows the site was occupied between 6390 and 6210 BC. The possible site of a building with hearths has been identified through archaeological excavation.
