= Worlebury Hill =

Upland area in Somerset, England

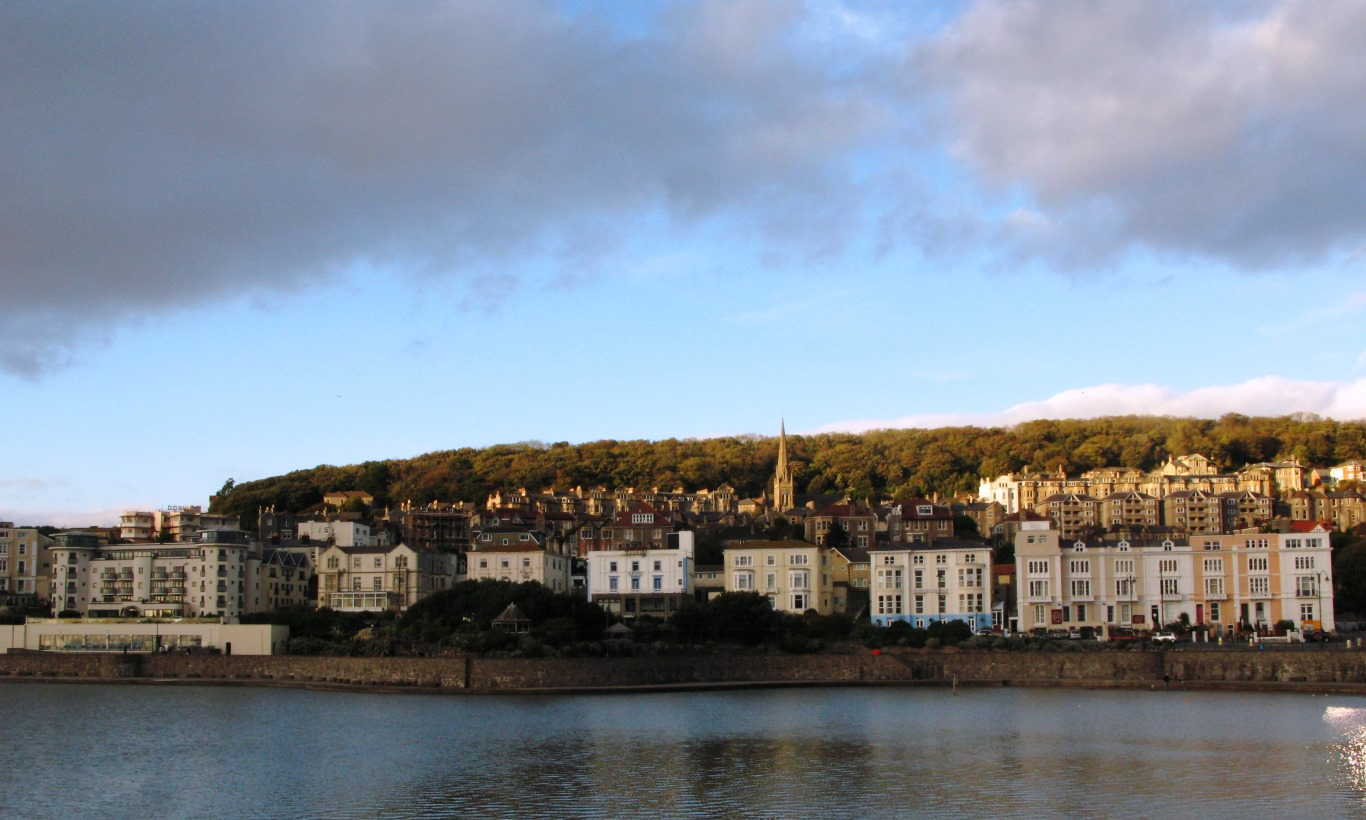
- The western end of the hill viewed from the south across Marine Lake

Highest point
- Coordinates: 51°21′28″N 2°58′49″W

Geography
- Location: North Somerset, England
- Parent range: Weston-Worle Ridge

Geology
- Mountain type: hill

Worlebury Hill is the name given to an upland area lying between the flatlands of Weston-super-Mare and the Kewstoke area of North Somerset, England. Worlebury Hill's rises from sea level to its highest point of 109 metres (358 ft), and the western end of the hill forms a peninsula, jutting out into the Bristol Channel, between Weston Bay and Sand Bay. A toll road follows the coast around the hill from Sand Bay in the north to the now derelict Birnbeck Pier in the west, although tolls are not currently collected on the road. Worlebury Golf Club is situated on the Hill and the area is known for being one of the wealthiest areas in the county of Somerset.

== History ==
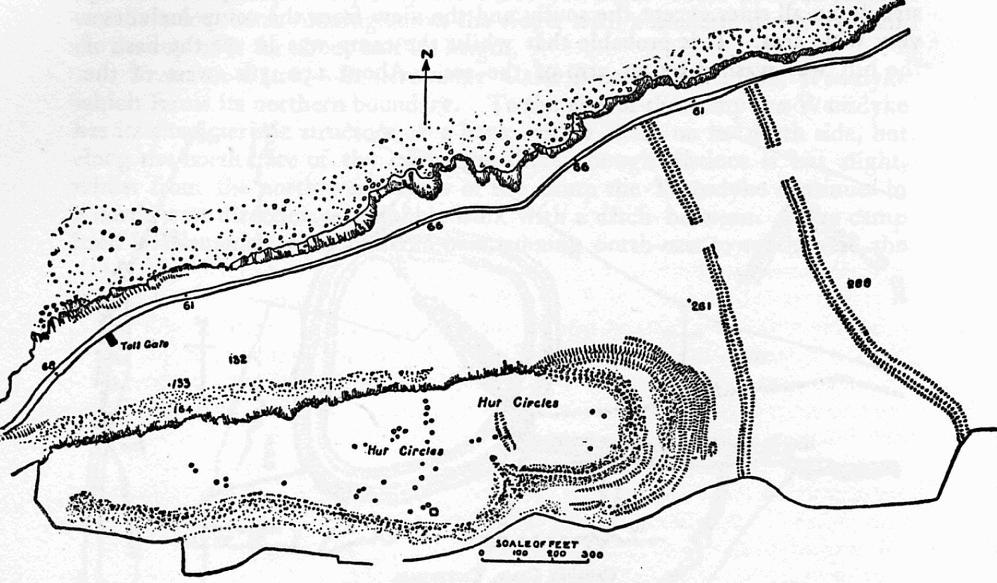
Plan of Worlebury Camp

The hill is the site of the Iron Age hillfort Worlebury Camp which occupies the western end of the wooded east-west ridge. It is a partly multi-vallate hillfort with stone-built ramparts. Excavated in the nineteenth century, structural details of several storage pits and the ramparts were discovered. The site is a Scheduled Monument (1011260) and was added to the Heritage at Risk Register in 2017, its condition noted as 'declining'. A condition survey and an analytical earthwork survey revealed some evidence about the use of the hillfort and its later history but many questions remain.

It seems likely that the name 'Worlebury' was corrupted by confusion with 'Whortleberry' - a common local vernacular term for the Bilberry (Vaccinium myrtillus). Maps from the early Victorian era show the hill's name as 'Worle Berry'. While the Bilberry is not currently found on Worlebury Hill, it is an abundant and familiar plant in the Mendips, not too far away, on similar soils. However, the placename Worle is recorded in the Domesday Book and Bury was an Old English term, used to refer to a fortification - i.e. the hillfort.

Many of Weston-super-Mare's large Victorian residences are built on the lower slopes of the southern side of the hill, but the rest of the hill is heavily wooded. There are ancient fortifications at the top of the hill. Quarrying took place at various places on the hill from the late 18th century until the town quarry was abandoned in 1953. Before the flatlands were adequately drained, the main route to Bristol ran eastwards along the hillside.

== Weston Woods ==
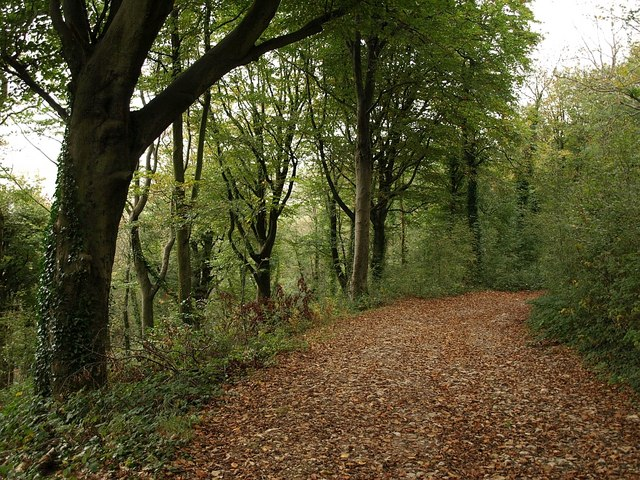
A footpath through Weston Woods

Weston Woods, which cover a large part of the hill top, contain patches of Ancient Woodland; the woods were awarded a Planting Places Award in a scheme run by Sustainability South West to celebrate "brilliant examples of urban greenspaces" on 6 March 2008. The woods are a 129.56 hectares (320.1 acres) local nature reserve. The woodland provides a habitat for mammals including deer, badgers, red foxes and bats. Birds include great spotted woodpeckers, buzzards and treecreepers.

In 2020, North Somerset Council initiated a consultation on plans to remove "thousands of trees" to protect the remains of the Iron Age fort.
