= Ebbor Gorge =

Limestone gorge in Somerset, England

- Site of Special Scientific Interest
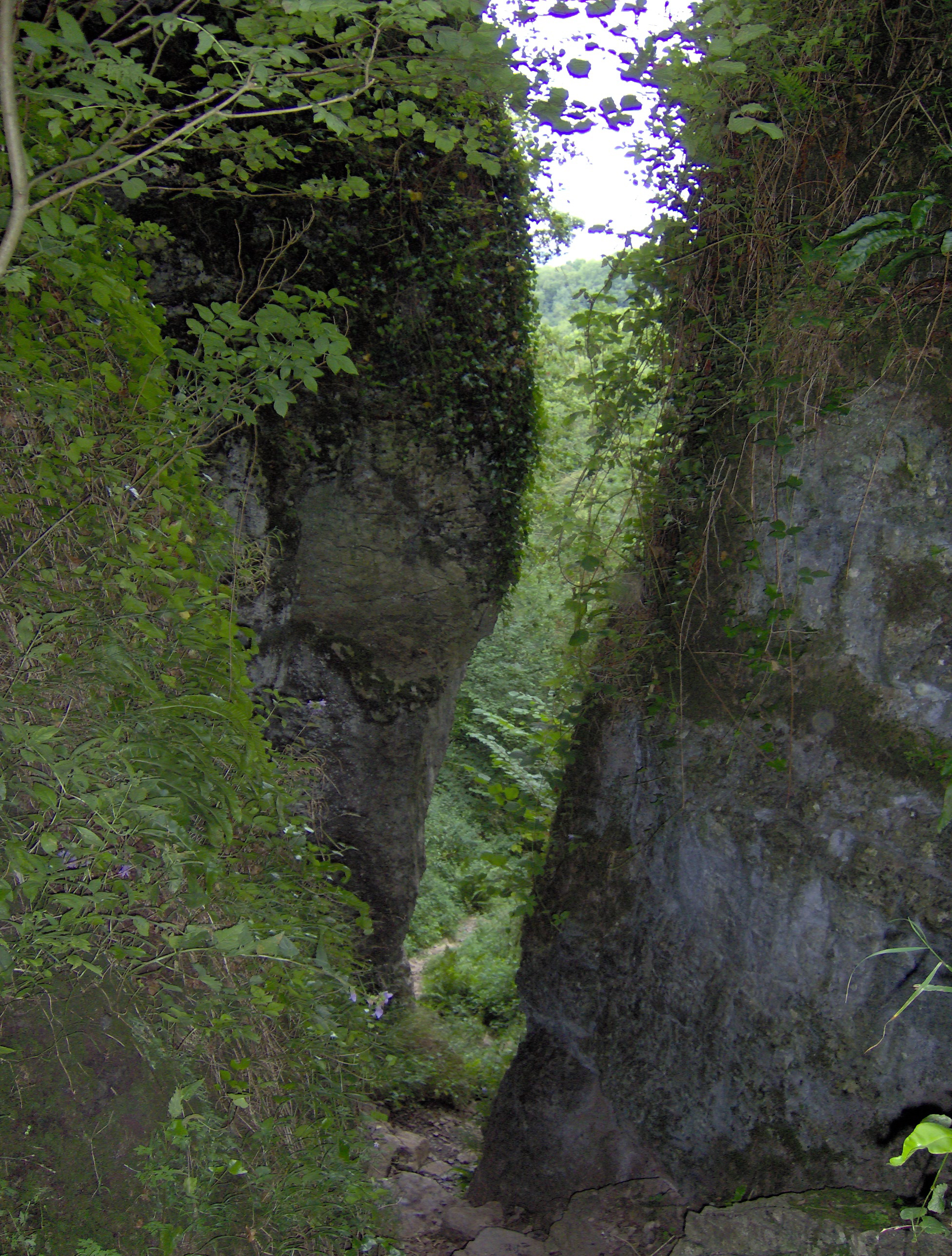

- Location within Somerset
- Location of Ebbor Gorge.
- Area of search: Somerset
- Grid reference: ST525485
- Coordinates: 51.234°N 2.682°W
- Interest: Biological
- Area: 156.8 acres (0.635 km^{2}; 0.2450 sq mi)
- Notification date: 1952

Ebbor Gorge is a limestone gorge in Somerset, England, designated and notified in 1952 as a 63.5-hectare (157-acre) biological Site of Special Scientific Interest in the Mendip Hills. It was donated to the National Trust in 1967 and is now managed by Natural England as a national nature reserve.

The gorge was cut mostly into the Clifton Down Limestone, part of the Lower Carboniferous Pembroke Group, by water. The site was occupied by humans in the Neolithic Era and their tools and flint arrow heads have been discovered, along with pottery from the Bronze Age. There are also fossils of small mammals from the Late Devensian. The nature reserve provides a habitat for a variety of flora and fauna, including flowers, butterflies and bats.

== Geology ==
Ebbor Gorge lies on the southwest-facing slope of the Mendip Hills and consists of a steep-sided ravine cut into 350-million-year-old Carboniferous Limestone of the Dinantian. The gorge was cut into Clifton Down Limestone by meltwater in the Pleistocene Epoch. The lowest part of the gorge is formed in the Namurian Quartzitic Sandstone Group and the South Wales Lower Coal Measures, over which younger limestones have been thrust to the north-east, as demonstrated by the BGS maps (1:50,000 sheet 280, Wells). An example of the rare mineral mendipite was found at the head of the gorge.

A stream issuing to the west of the site runs down the tributary valley of Hope Wood before joining the main gorge. The original watercourse which may have cut the gorge into the limestone became diverted underground and now emerges at Wookey Hole Caves to form the River Axe.

== History ==
Various caves within the gorge were inhabited by neolithic people from which flint tools are held in the Wells and Mendip Museum. One particularly fine flint flake can be seen in the museum at King John's Hunting Lodge in Axbridge. Human and animal bones from the Neolithic were recovered from Outlook Cave in 1907. Bones from the Palaeolithic have been found at Savory's Hole.

Several caves occur within the Gorge, of which Bridged Pot and Gully Cave provide some of the best Late Devensian small-mammal assemblages known from Britain. Most of the deposits remain in situ and include steppe pika, Arctic lemming, Norway lemming, various voles, red deer and reindeer. Bronze Age finds include pottery from the Beaker culture, a stone axe and flint knife.

== Current use ==
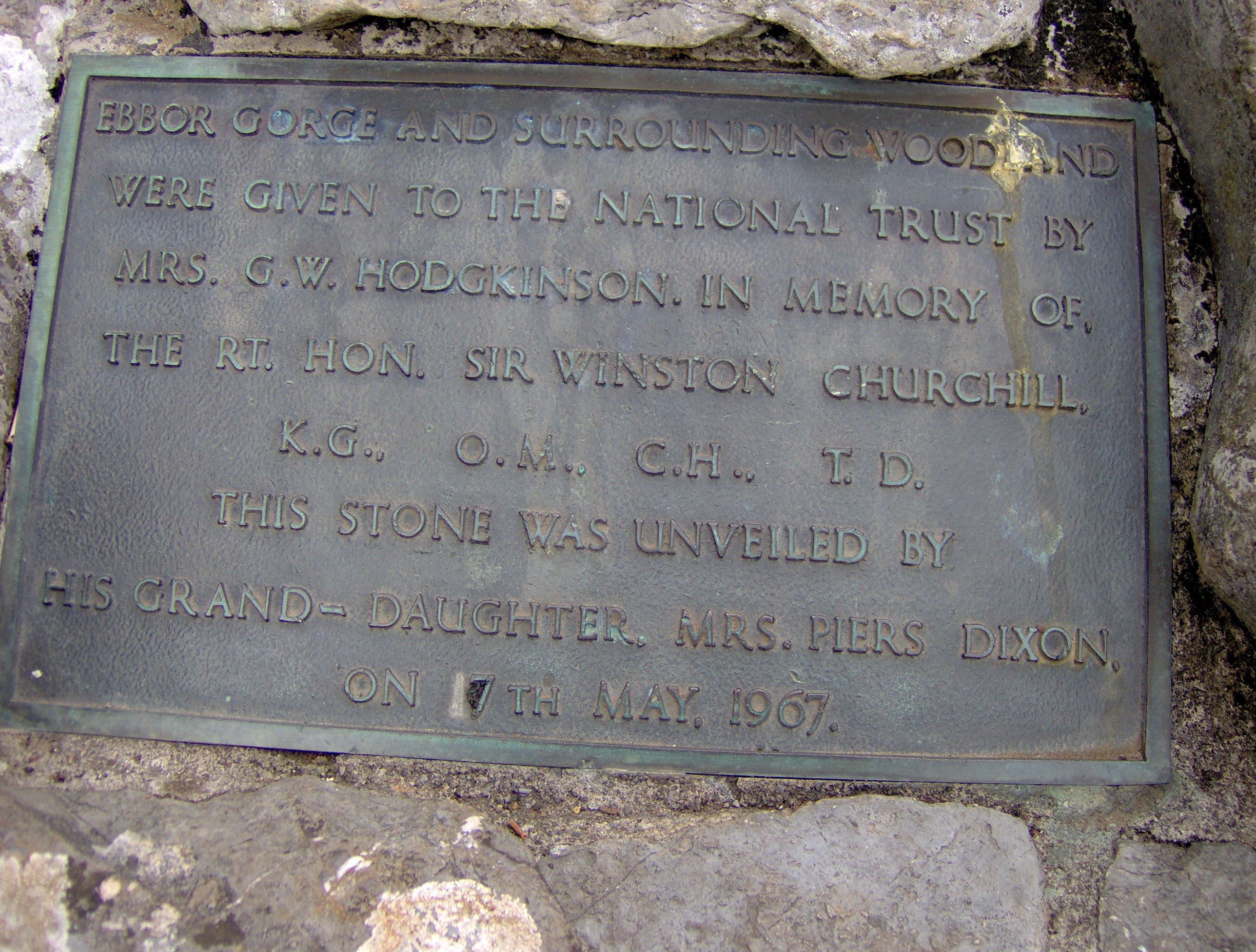
Plaque at Ebbor Gorge commemorating the donation of the land

A 40-hectare (99-acre) area of the gorge is owned by the National Trust, and managed by Natural England as a national nature reserve. The land was donated to the National Trust by Mrs G.W. Hodgkinson, in 1967, in memory of Winston Churchill. The site was purchased in 1931 by Wookey Hole Caves Ltd.

The site is close to Wookey Hole village and caves and offers views across the Somerset Levels to Glastonbury Tor and beyond. There are three marked trails of varying lengths around the steeply wooded gorge, the longest being 3 kilometres (1.9 mi) long, the shortest of which is suitable for wheelchair users.

== Biology and ecology ==
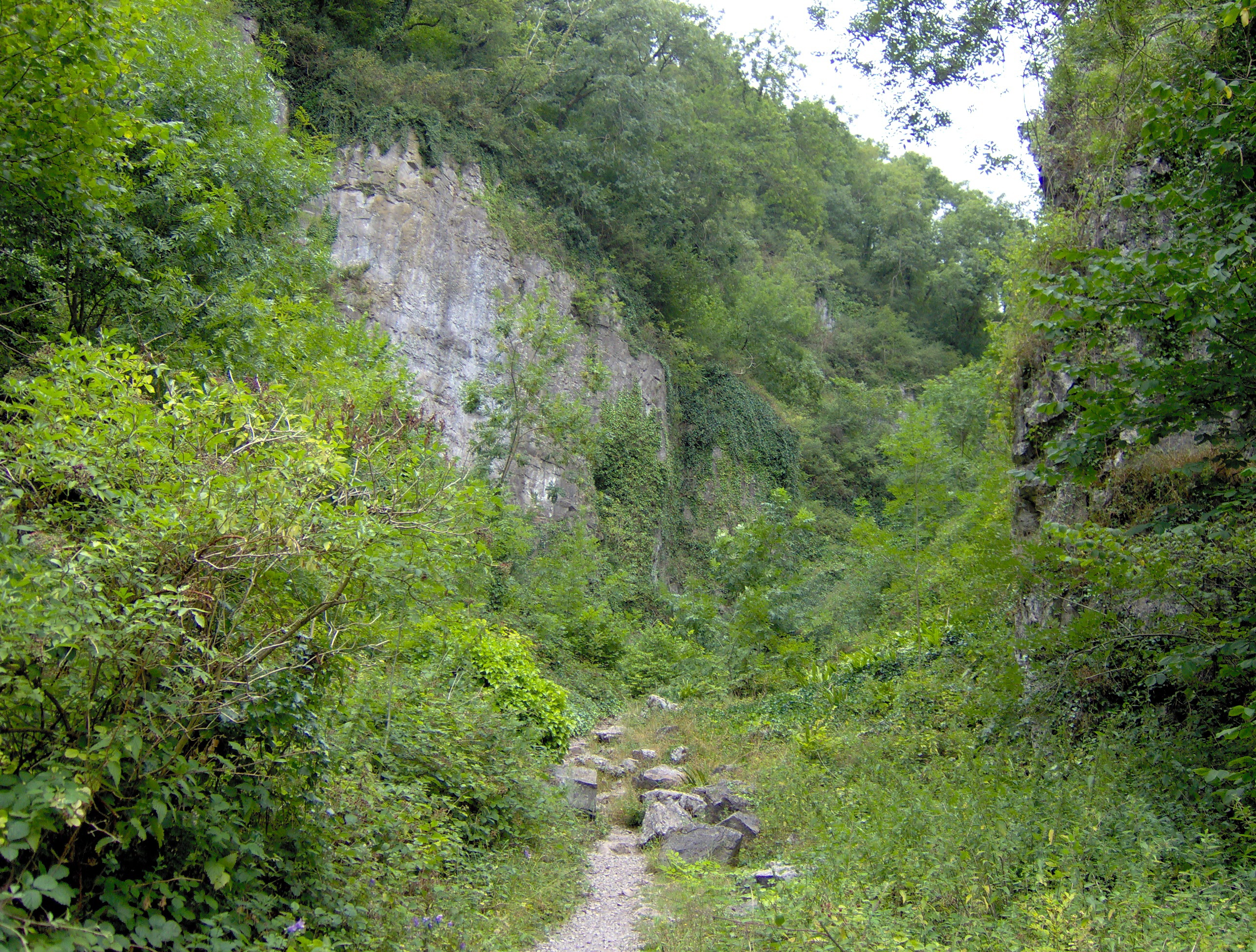
The path into the gorge

Because of the ecology of the area 63.5 hectares (157 acres) was designated as a biological Site of Special Scientific Interest in 1952. The ground flora is indicative of the calcareous nature of the site, with dog's mercury (Mercurialis perennis) being locally dominant. Many of the associated species are characteristic of ancient woodland. Wood anemone (Anemone nemorosa) and common bluebell (Hyacinthoides non-scripta) are both locally abundant. The valley of the main gorge is humid and provides ideal conditions for fungi and ferns. It contains a substantial assemblage of bryophytes with over 120 species recorded including the nationally rare Bryum canariense and the very rare Amblystegiella confervoides.

The varied age and canopy structure of woodland encourages a high diversity of butterflies, nationally scarce species including the white-letter hairstreak (Strymonidia walbum) and high brown fritillary (Fabriciana adippe), while species such as the chalkhill blue (Lysandra coridon) and brown argus (Aricia agestis) occur on the limestone grassland. Greater horseshoe bats (Rhinolophus ferrumequinum) and lesser horseshoes (Rhinolophus hipposideros) regularly use sites in the Gorge as hibernacular roosts. The site also supports birds of prey and a few red deer.
