= Clifton Down Limestone =

- Stratigraphic range: Carboniferous
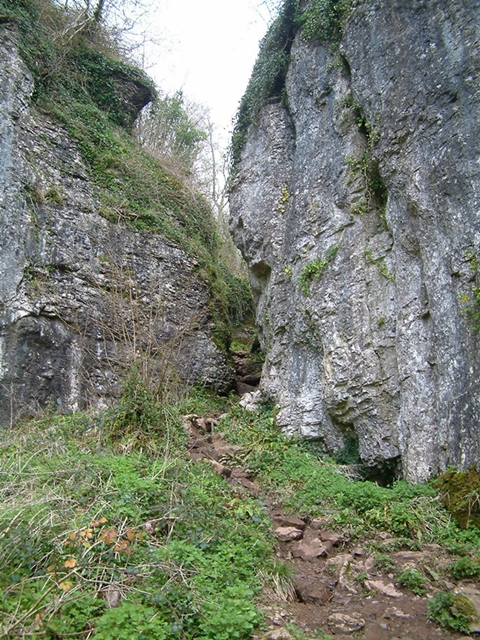
- Clifton Down Limestone in Ebbor Gorge, Somerset
- Type: Formation
- Unit of: Pembroke Limestone Group, Carboniferous Limestone Supergroup

Location
- Region: England
- Country: United Kingdom

The Clifton Down Limestone is a geologic formation in England. It preserves fossils dating back to the Carboniferous period.

== See also ==
- List of fossiliferous stratigraphic units in England
