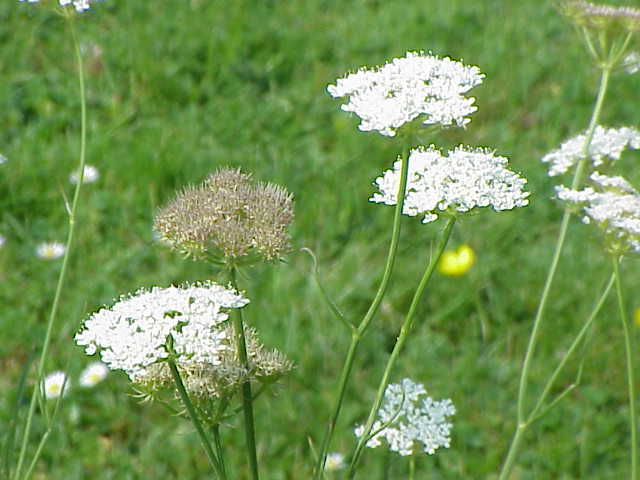

Conservation status
- Least Concern (IUCN 3.1)

Scientific classification
- Kingdom: Plantae
- Clade: Embryophytes
- Clade: Tracheophytes
- Clade: Angiosperms
- Clade: Eudicots
- Clade: Asterids
- Order: Apiales
- Family: Apiaceae
- Genus: Oenanthe
- Species: O. pimpinelloides

Binomial name
- Oenanthe pimpinelloides L.

= Oenanthe pimpinelloides =

Species of flowering plant

Oenanthe pimpinelloides is a species of flowering plant in the family Apiaceae known by the common name corky-fruited water-dropwort. It is a plant of tall, lightly grazed or infrequently mown grassland and coastal meadows in Europe and neighbouring parts of Asia and North Africa.

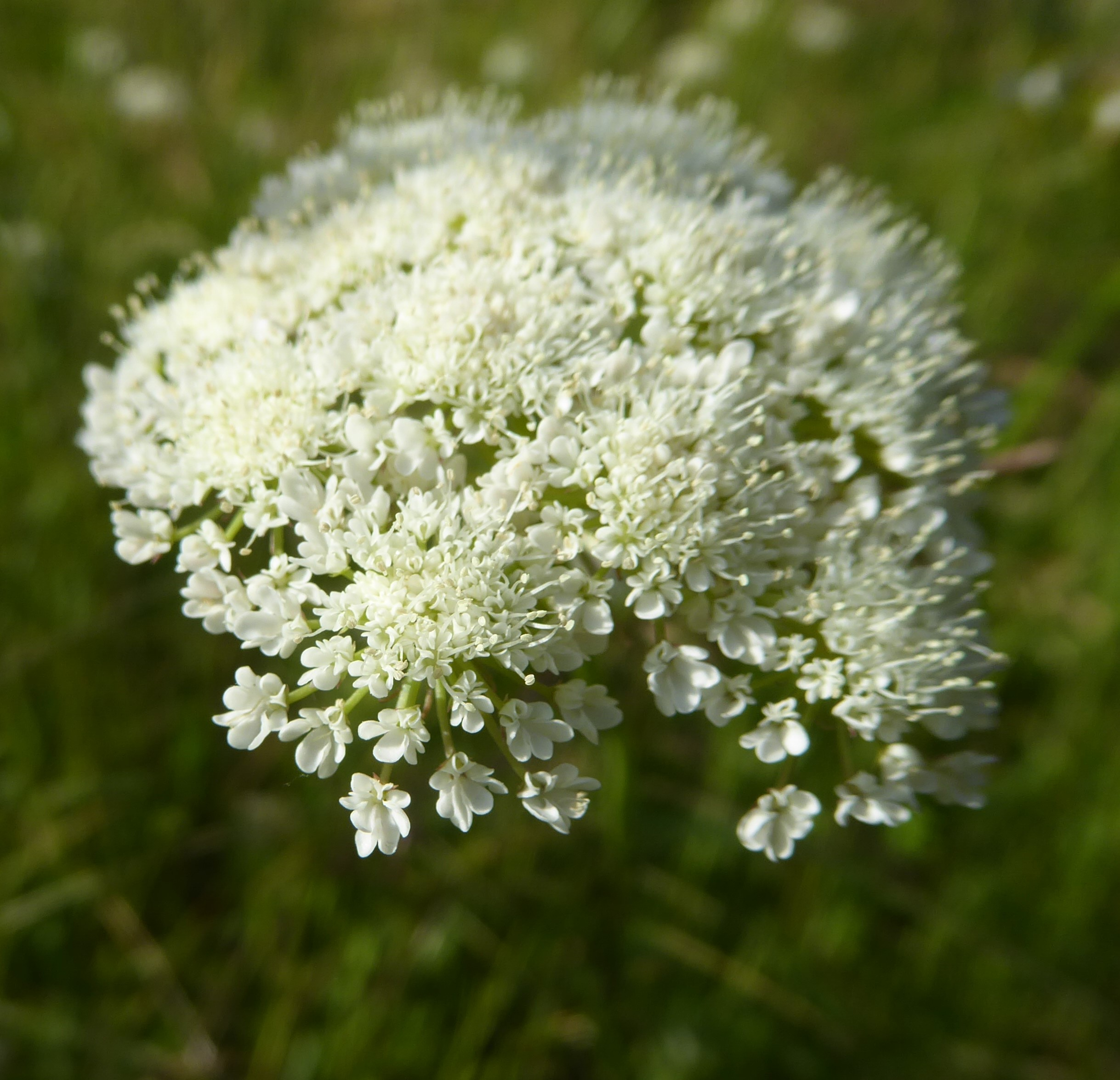
The outer flowers have enlarged "radiating" petals.

== Description ==
Corky-fruited water-dropwort is a hairless, upright perennial with a solid, strongly grooved stem measuring up to 100 cm in height and 0.5 cm in diameter. The roots contain ovoid tubers a short distance from the base of the stem. The lanceolate to ovate lower leaves are twice pinnate with broad, toothed, cuneate segments 55 mm long and have a petiole up to 10 cm long. The petiole may exude sparse white latex when pierced. The upper leaves are once- or twice-pinnate, and the blade is at least the same length as the petiole; the linear, entire lobes are 10–30 mm long.

The main umbels each have of 6–15 smooth rays, 1–2 cm long, which thicken after flowering. Below these rays is a whorl of up to 5 small linear-lanceolate bracts. The peduncles of the secondary umbels (umbellules) are longer than the rays and also thicken after flowering, producing fruiting heads that are distinctively flat-topped. Each umblellule is subtended by 12-20 small, linear bracteoles.

It flowers from June to August in the UK. The terminal umbels have both male-only and bisexual flowers, while the lateral umbels produce only male flowers. The non-fruiting male-only flowers are on longer stalks (pedicels) than the bisexual ones. Each tiny flower has 5 pointed, green sepals and 5 white petals, the outermost of which are slightly larger (a phenomenon known as "radiating"). There are 5 stamens, and 2 styles which project from the bulbous centre of the flower (the stylopodium). The stylopodium is the organ which secretes nectar onto its surface, attracting unspecialised species of pollinating insect, such as flies. The fruit is a schizocarp: a hard capsule that splits into two one-seeded mericarps as it matures. Each schizocarp is 3-3.5 mm long, with a prominent ridge on each mericarp. Like the rays and the peduncles, the individual pedicels also thicken after flowering.

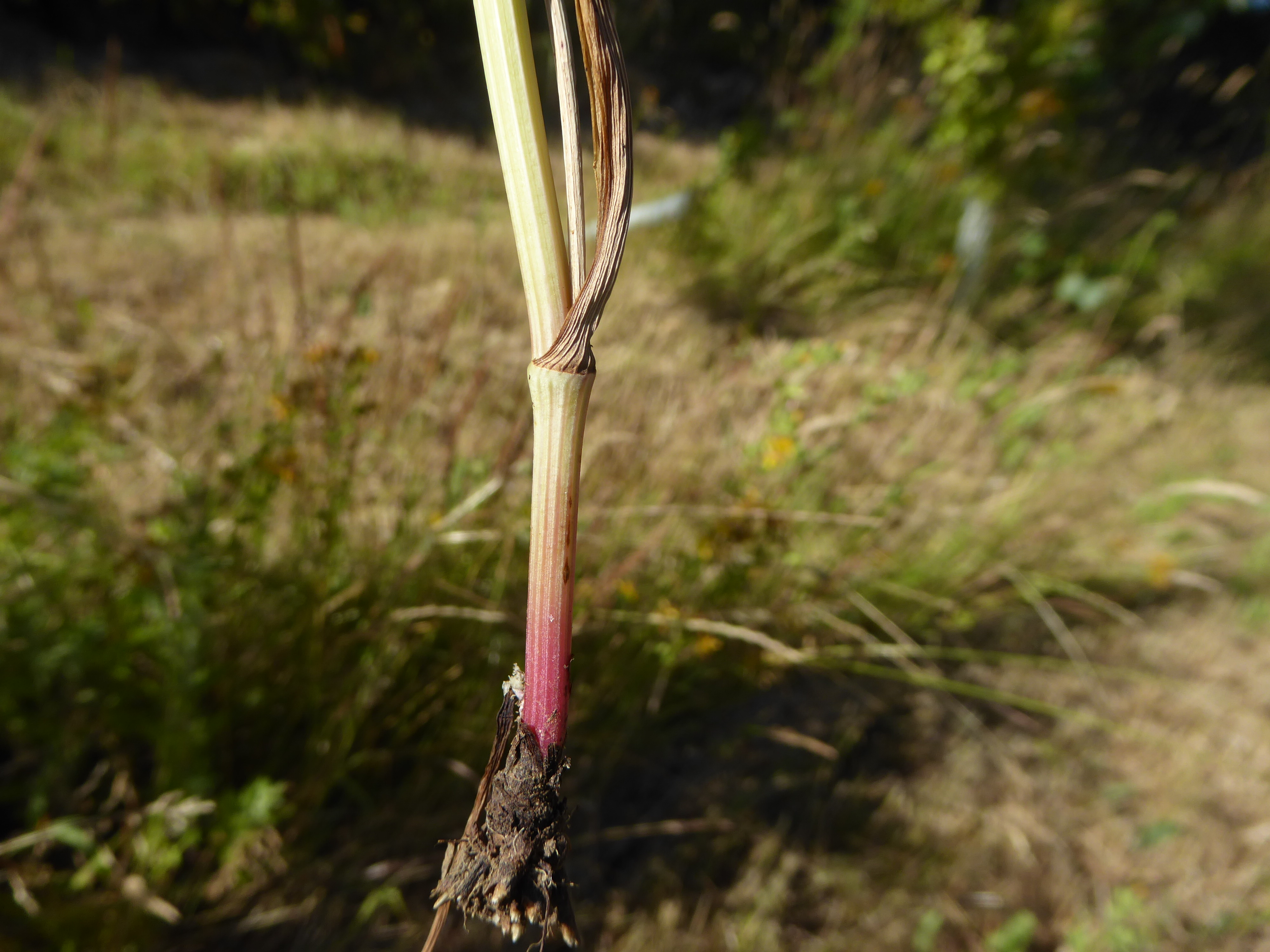
The lower part of the stem is often tinged purple

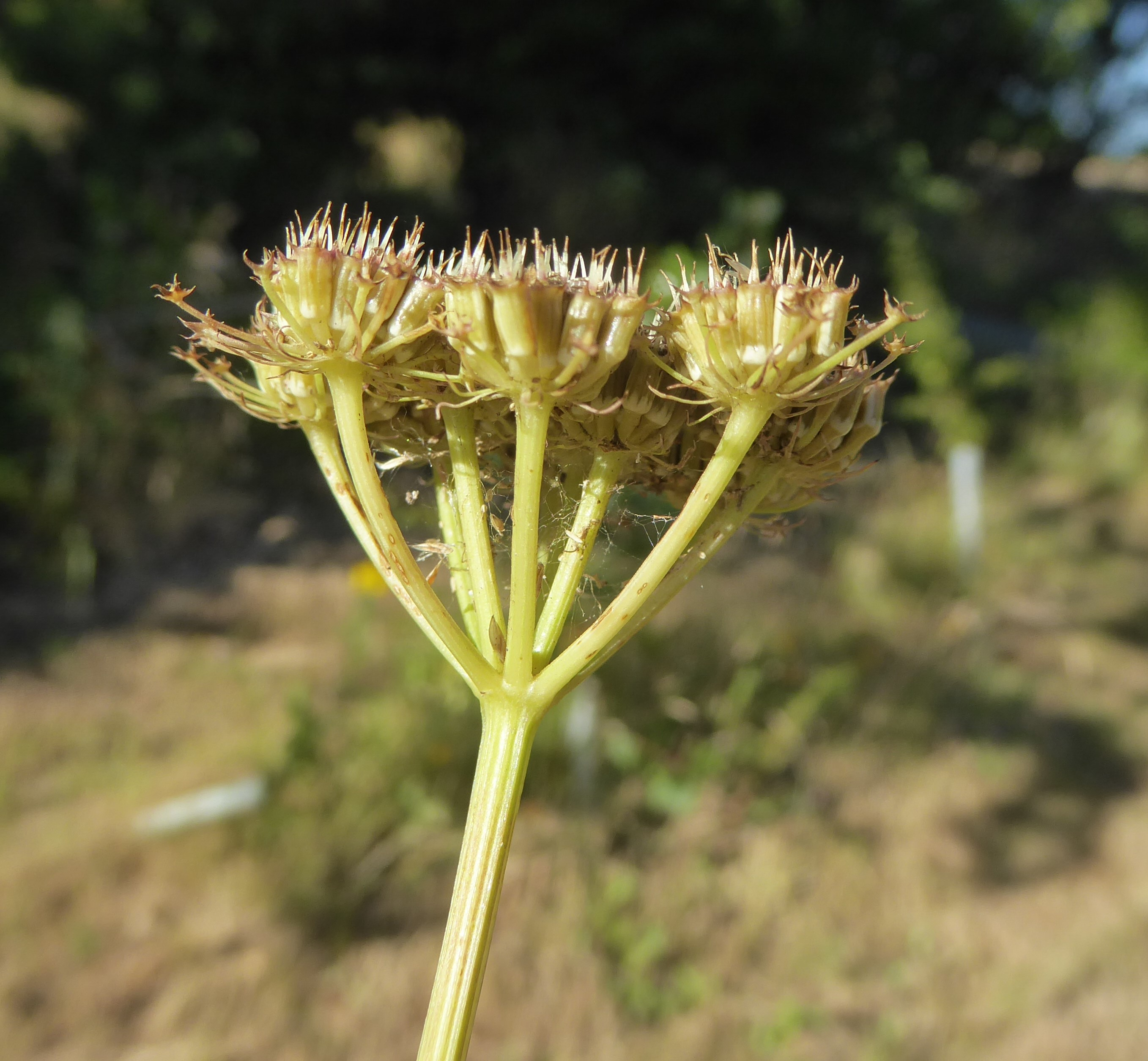
A fruiting umbel, showing the characteristic flat top and the long pedicels where male flowers have faded.

== Identification ==
Unlike other species in the genus, Oenanthe pimpinelloides has ovoid to globose root tubers (‘potatoes’) that are situated some distance from the base of the stem. Narrow-leaved water-dropwort may also have tubers of this shape (the only other species displaying such a character), but in contrast to O. pimpinelloides, these are held close to the base of the plant. However, on the grounds of conservation and wildlife law, the plant should not be uprooted to examine this character for identification purposes; different morphological features and habitat context should be looked at instead.

Amongst the British species, corky-fruited water-dropwort is distinctive because it tends to grow in dry habitats and has flat-topped umbels. The bracts distinguish it from narrow-leaved water-dropwort, which has similarly fine foliage.

O. pimpinelloides has been frequently confused with the very similar O. incrassans in southeast Europe, which is sometimes treated as a subspecies.

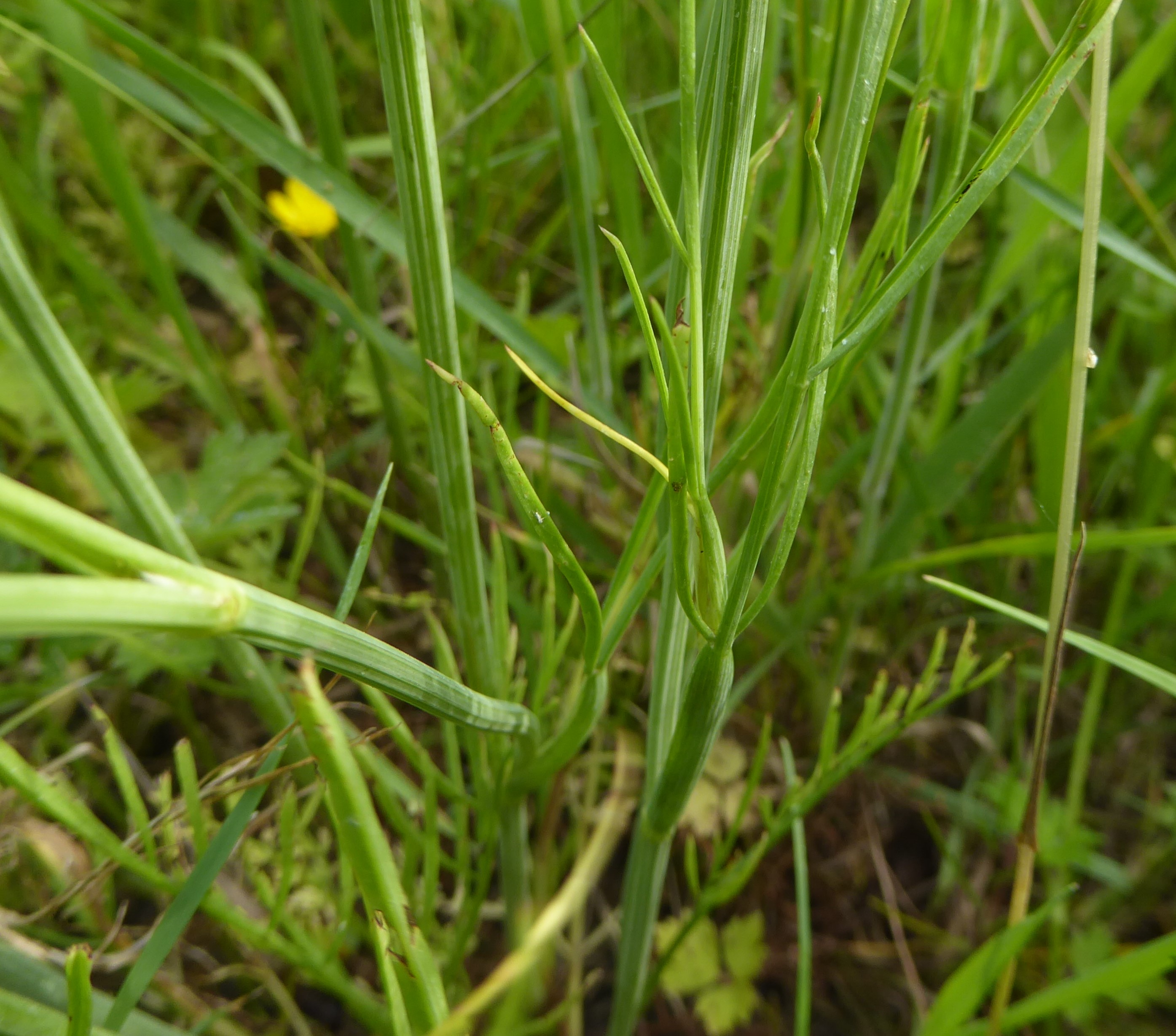
The upper leaves have narrow, linear segments

== Taxonomy and nomenclature ==
The scientific name for corky-fruited water-dropwort was coined by Peter Artedi, who developed the modern binomial classification system, and defined the species on the basis of its involucral characters. However, Artedi's original Oenanthe pimpinelloides was not adequately separated from O. lachenalii and it was not until 1844 that a useful distinction between those two species was made.

The original (ambiguous) name was published after Artedi's death by Linnaeus in Species Plantarum, in 1753, and that name still stands for this species, although numerous synonyms have been proposed over the years, including Oenanthe globosa Georgi (1800), Oenanthe graminifolia Gaudin (1828), Oenanthe anatolica K. Koch (1846), and Phellandrium mathioli Bubani (1899). A full list can be found in the Synonymic Checklists of the Plants of the World.

The following subspecies are currently recognised: O. pimpinelloides subsp. incrassans (Bory & Chaub.) Strid (2012), which occurs only in Greece; O. pimpinelloides subsp. callosa (Salzm. ex DC.) Maire, which is only in Morocco; and O. pimpinelloides subsp. pimpinelloides, which accounts for all other populations but is rarely recorded.

There are no reported hybrids.

Its chromosome number is 2n = 22.

The generic name Oenanthe, which comes from the Ancient Greek οίνος, "wine" and άνθος, "flower", was used in ancient times for certain Mediterranean plants and later adopted to describe this genus. The Latin specific epithet “pimpinelloides” means “resembling Pimpinella”, another genus in the same family (Apiaceae). The "dropwort" part of the common name is a reference to the tubers produced amongst the roots of this and certain other species in the genus.

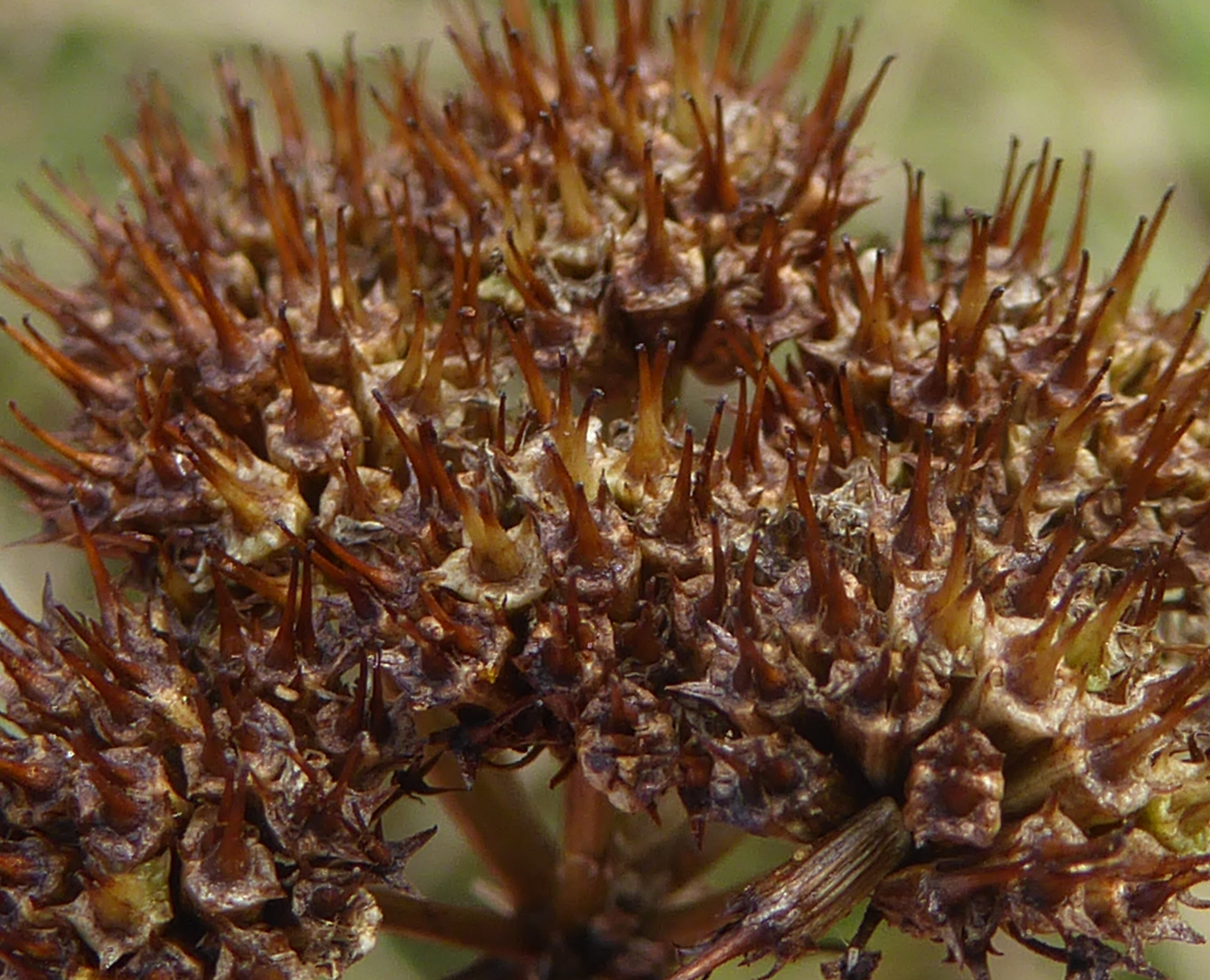
Mature fruit

== Habitat and ecology ==
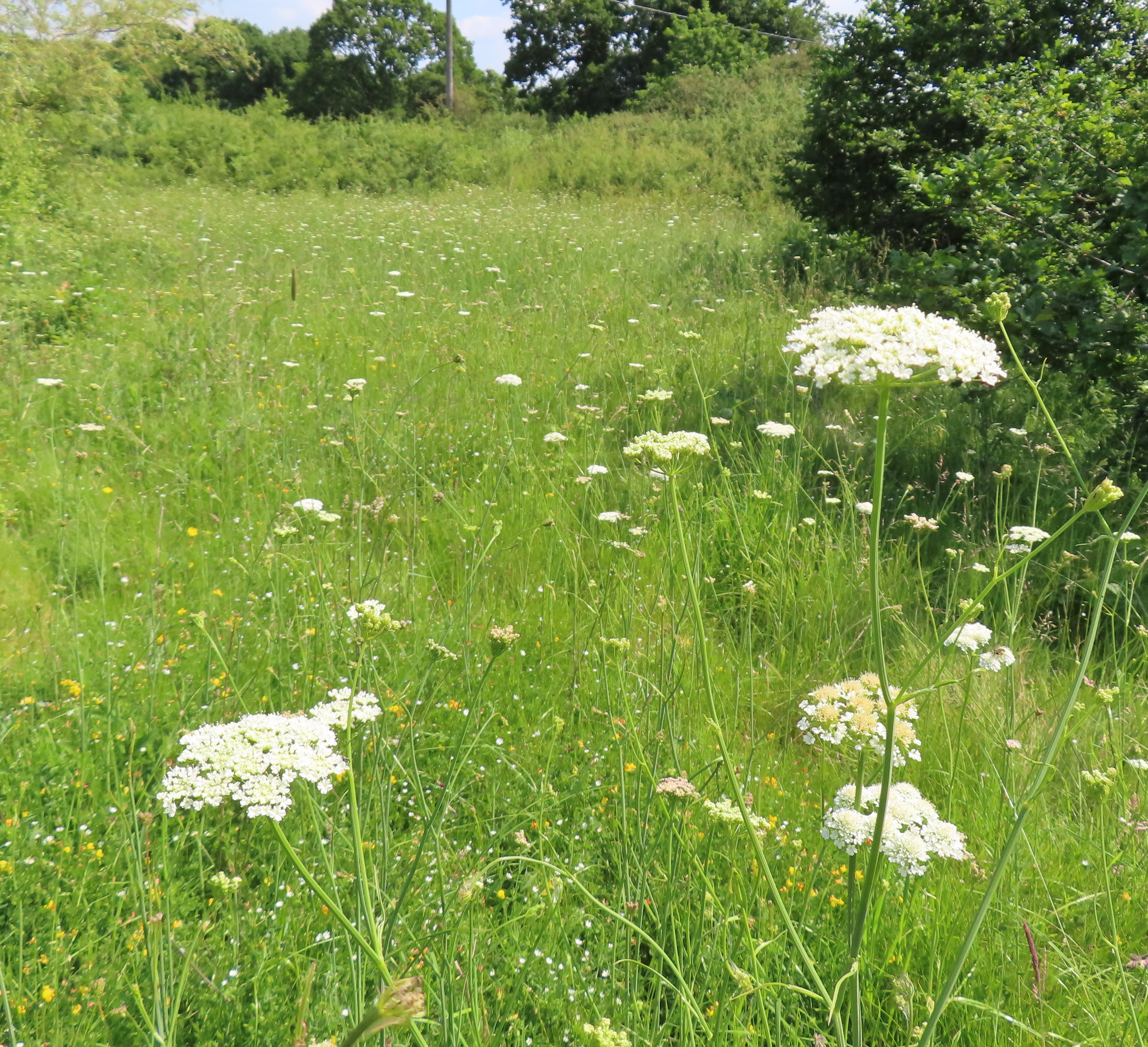
A corky-fruited water-dropwort meadow in Kent.

This is a plant of damp to dry grassland, hay meadows, old pastures and roadsides. Being more resistant to water stress than its congeners, it is the only water-dropwort that grows in dry lowland habitats in some parts of its natural range. Although it is usually described as a grassland plant, its habitat is often somewhat ruderal and tending towards scrub. In Sardinia, it has been described as a plant of myrtle scrub around Mediterranean temporary ponds, and in Turkey it is often found under hazel trees.

Under the European Nature Information classification system EUNIS it is considered a characteristic species of "Atlantic false oat-grass meadows" (E2.211), which are restricted to the southern parts of the British Isles and western France. This is equivalent to MG1 Arrhenatherum elatius in the British NVC, although it was omitted from the original description of that community. False oat-grass meadows are characteristic of southern English counties such as Somerset and Hampshire, although this community is now more often found on road verges and field margins.

A different, but analogous, habitat for it is the EUNIS "Mediterranean tall humid grasslands" (E3.1), which are widespread throughout southern Europe as far east as the Black Sea.

Its Ellenberg values in Britain are L = 7, F = 7, R = 6, N = 3, and S = 0.

Five species of insect are known to feed on corky-fruited water-dropwort in the UK. Three of these are flies: Kiefferia pericarpiicola larvae produce galls on the flowers and seeds; Lasioptera carophila is a midge which also produces galls in the flowers or stems; and carrot fly can attack the roots. The remaining two species are Lepidoptera: Depressaria daucella caterpillars feed among the flowerheads, while Agonopterix yeatiana larvae roll the leaves and shoots.

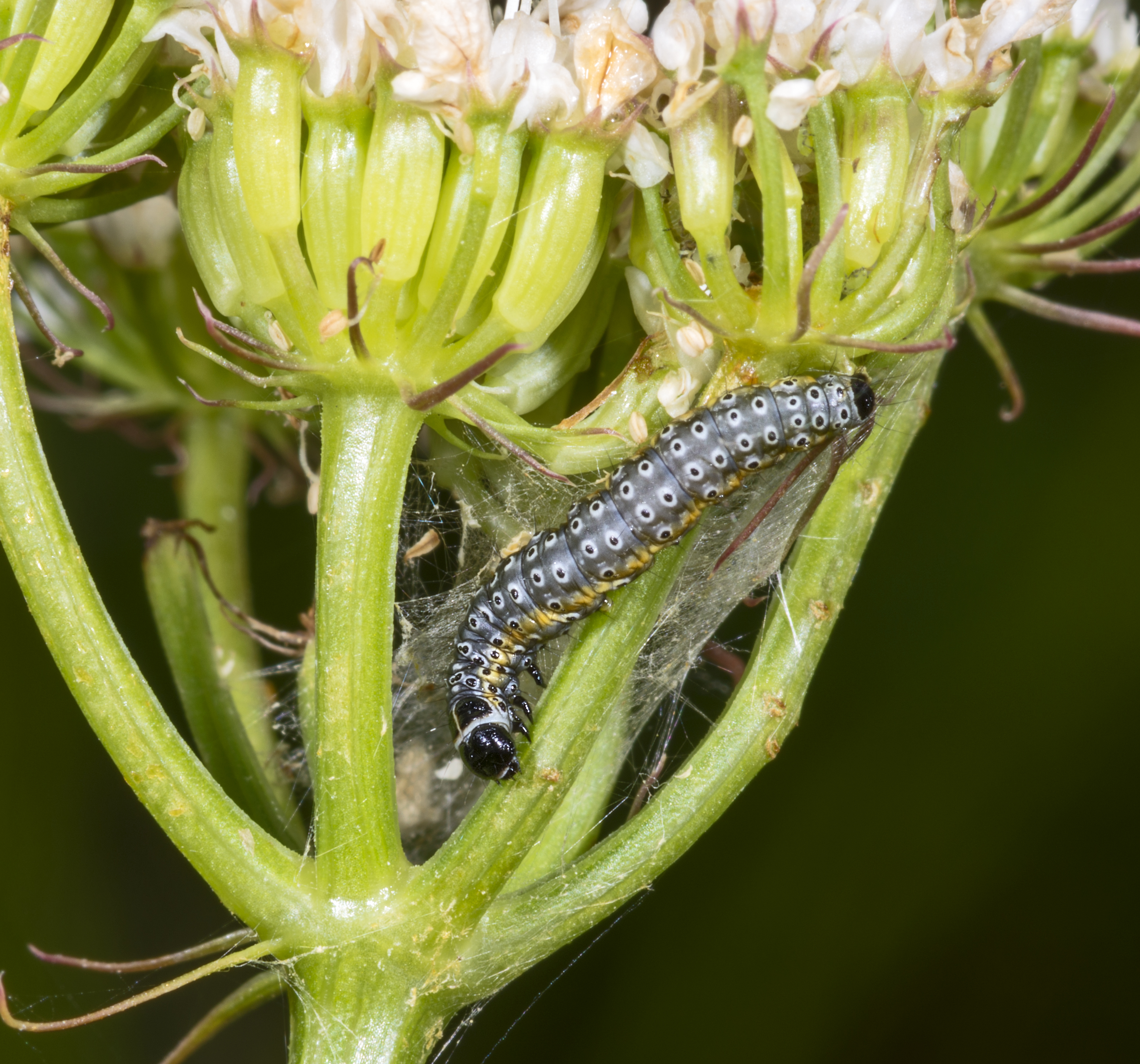
Larva of Depressaria daucella on a flowerhead of O. pimpinelloides

O. pimpinelloides can be a noxious weed in New Zealand on account of its vigorous, persistent growth where no natural enemies occur, potentially outcompeting native eucalypts.

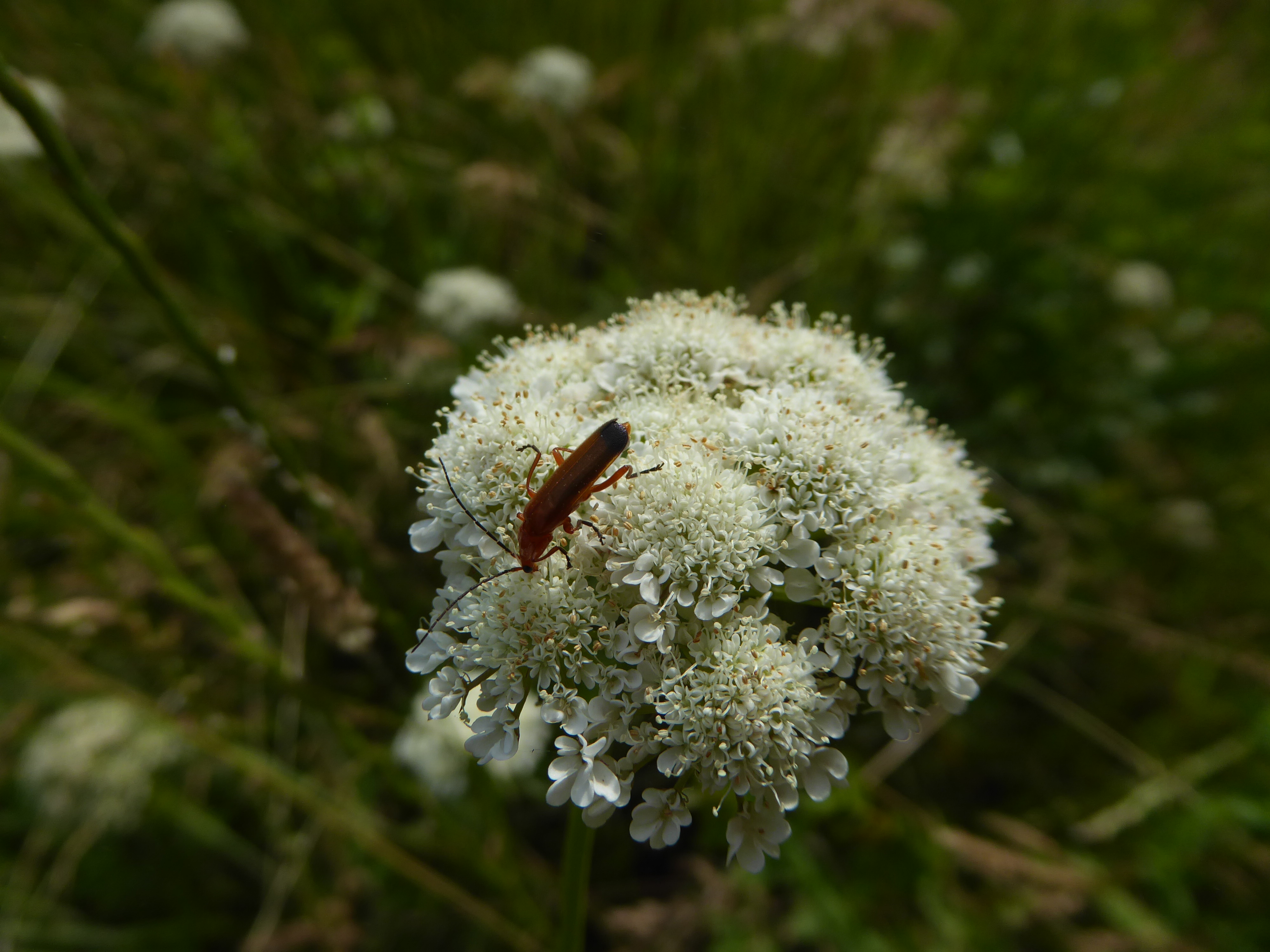
Pollination is by unspecialised insects such as this bonking beetle, Rhagonycha fulva

== Distribution and status ==
Corky-fruited water-dropwort is widely distributed in Europe, ranging from western Ireland and southern Britain to Turkey, then into western Asia including Israel, Jordon, Lebanon, and Syria. It also extends south through France, Spain, Portugal, and Morocco.

The centre of the world distribution of corky-fruited water-dropwort (Œnanthe faux boucage) is in France, where it is most common in the south-west, and overall is classified as "Least Concern". However, it becomes scarcer (VU) inland in places like the Rhône-Alpes region and even Critically Endangered at the northern edge of its range in Upper Normandy.

In the UK, its natural range is restricted to a few counties such as Somerset, Dorset, and Hampshire; where it is locally common. However, it may be naturalized elsewhere in the country, such as in Cambridgeshire. In 2006, several plants were discovered growing around fishermen’s platforms dug into the bank of a lake at RAF Waterbeach. The following year, about a dozen plants were found growing in a naturalized state on a lawn around a small pond at the British Antarctic Headquarters at High Cross, Cambridge.

A new Irish record for the species was made at Duncannon in County Wexford in 2006.

== Uses ==
The related species hemlock water-dropwort is highly poisonous, and it is often assumed that corky-fruited water-dropwort would be similarly dangerous, but there is no record of it ever harming humans or livestock, and it often occurs in hay meadows and pastures without any ill effect on cattle, sheep or horses.

Mrs Grieve described it as innocuous, and suggested that the tubers have "something the flavour of a filbert"; she did not consider it to have any medicinal properties, however. In Turkey it is reported to be consumed by the locals after roasting or cooking with yoghurt and bulgur wheat or pickled and cooked in the winter. It is said to be used as a digestive stimulant.
