= Helyar =

Helyar is a surname. Notable people with the surname include:

- John Helyar (born 1951), American journalist and author
- William Helyar (1559–1645), English Anglican archdeacon
  - Helyar Almshouses, a building

== See also ==
- Helyer
