= The Dry Salvages =

1941 poem written by T. S. Eliot

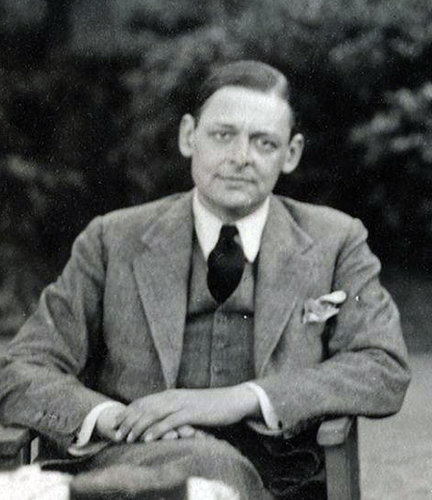
T. S. Eliot in 1934

The Dry Salvages is the third poem of T. S. Eliot's Four Quartets, marking the beginning of the point when the series was consciously being shaped as a set of four poems. It was written and published in 1941 during the air-raids on Great Britain, an event that threatened him while giving lectures in the area. The title comes from the name of a marine rock formation off the coast of Cape Ann, Massachusetts, where he spent time at as a child.

The poem discusses the nature of time and what humanity's place is within time. Life is described metaphorically as travelling in a boat and humanity's fixation on science and future gain keeping the travellers from reaching their destination. Within the poem, Eliot invokes the image of Krishna to emphasise the need to follow the divine will, instead of seeking personal gain.

== Background ==
Eliot began working on The Dry Salvages during World War II, at a time when London was experiencing air-raids near the end of 1940. During the time, he moved around often and spent his time writing mostly lectures or tiny poems. However, he was able to find time to work on the third poem that would become part of the Four Quartets: Eliot envisioned that Burnt Norton, East Coker, The Dry Salvages, and a fourth, yet unwritten poem would be united in a set. Eliot wrote the poem quickly and sent the first draft off on 1 January 1941 to John Hayward. After Hayward received the draft, the two began corresponding about edits and alterations to the poem. Geoffrey Faber joined in and then the poem was soon finished. It was published in the February 1941 issue of the New English Weekly.

According to a note by Eliot under the title, "The Dry Salvages—presumably les trois sauvages—is a small group of rocks, with a beacon, off the north east coast of Cape Ann, Massachusetts. Salvages is pronounced to rhyme with assuages." The location is a place that Eliot knew, and the poem links the image of Cape Ann to Eliot's boyhood sailing at Gloucester Harbor. The Dry Salvages also invokes images of the Mississippi River and Eliot's childhood in St Louis. Originally, these images and the other personal references were intended to be discussed in an autobiographical work that was to collect a series of essays about Eliot's childhood.

== Poem ==
The poem is described as a poem of water and hope. It begins with images of rivers and the sea, of water, and of Eliot's past; this water later becomes a metaphor for life and how humans act. The narrator compares rivers to a "strong brown god" that humanity tames especially in city life, while the sea is powerful, mysterious, and filled with many discordant "voices" that embody both creative and destructive forces of time and nature beyond human control.

In the second section, the poem transitions into an image of a ringing bell and a discussion on time and prayer. Images of men drowning dominate the section before giving way to a brief insight into how science and ideas on evolution separate mankind from a proper understanding of the past. Here, the narrator suggests that life is like "drifting wreckage" and a "boat with a slow leakage", emphasizing a sense of aimless persistence in the face of mortality and existential ambiguity.

In the third section, the narrator invokes the Bhagavad Gita, wherein the wise creator god Krishna tells the uncertain warrior Arjuna that the divine will, and not future benefits or rewards, matters, comparing the audience to "voyagers". The narrator urges the audience to "fare forward" without being bound by past or future, underscoring a timeless journey of self-realization where each moment holds potential meaning.

The fourth section is a short, sixteen-line prayer to the Virgin Mary for fishermen, sailors, and the drowned.

The end of The Dry Salvages starts with a discussion about how people attempt to see the future through various superstitious means. Then the narrator tries to convince the reader that resignation about death is necessary. Such resignation should be viewed as hinting at "the point of intersection of the timeless with time" or glimpses of the divine, leading one to become satisfied "if our temporal reversion nourish...the life of significant soil" (with a reference to East Coker in the form of "the wild thyme unseen, or the winter lightning") and pushing the self towards redemption and the eternal life in the next world. By acting properly, one would be able to overcome life and move towards the next world.

== Themes ==
The central image of The Dry Salvages is water and the sea. The images are similar to the Odyssey but represent internal aspects. Humanity loses itself to technology and theories like evolution that separate mankind philosophically from the past. According to Eliot, within each man there is a connection to all of mankind. If we just accept drifting upon the sea, then we will end up broken upon rocks. We are restrained by time, but the Annunciation gave mankind hope that he will be able to escape. This hope is not part of the present. What we must do is understand the patterns found within the past to see that there is meaning to be found. This meaning allows one to experience eternity through moments of revelation. Through Christ, we are able to overcome time unless we do not know him. Our corruption can be overcome and that we are able to join the eternal.

Eliot invokes images of original sin and Adam's fall when talking about the past and points out that such events can be forgotten but can still affect mankind. Eliot brings in the image of Krishna to discuss how the past and future are related: Krishna, speaking to Arjuna, claims that death can come at any time and that men should always find the divine will instead of worrying about what their actions will bring. If an individual were to follow Krishna's words then they would be able to free their self from the limitations of time. Even if it cannot be fully attained, the effort in attempting it is still important. The way for mankind to understand the divine will is through prayer and through the power of the Holy Spirit.

Many of the images connect back to his earlier works. The images of life as boat adrift with a leak is similar to the "Death by Water" section of The Waste Land. Like images about old age and experience found in East Coker, this image reinforces the need to look at the whole of life and try to see things beyond the limitations of time. Men are supposed to progress, but they aren't supposed to focus on what they can gain in the future. The prayer to the Virgin Mary is intended to help guide the journey which would end with understanding eternity and the Annunciation. It is Mary who will guide the metaphorical sailors to their proper harbour. While connecting back to his earlier works, Eliot also connects back to his family's past; the "Dry Salvages" was part of the landscape his ancestor Andrew Eliot travelled to in 1669.

== Sources ==
Part of The Dry Salvages refers to Eliot's joining the Anglican Church and his personal pursuit of the divine. There are also many references to events and places that Eliot knew as a child. In terms of literary allusions, Eliot brings in Krishna's and Arjuna's discussion from the Bhagavad-Gita on acting according to the divine will along with allusions to Dante's Paradiso, the philosophy of Heraclitus, and the Book of Common Prayer. In regard to these allusions, Eliot would mark up his own editions of the works to note where he used quotes or allusions to lines within his work. In particular, his edition of the Mahabharata included a page added which compared battle scenes with "The Dry Salvages".

== Reception ==
A review in the Times Literary Supplement dated 4 September 1941 stated that there was a "note of quiescence, even of bleak resignation" in the poem and that it "lost that spice of wit which was woven into the logic of the earlier poems". Later, Bernard Bergonzi claimed that "The Dry Salvages is the least satisfactory of the sequence, though at the same time it contains some of its best lines. The opening lines are poor, in a weakly sub-Whitmanesque fashion. Yet the writing suddenly picks up at the words, 'The river is within us,' and from there to the end of the section we have a magnificently sustained sequence". F. B. Pinion believed that "'The Dry Salvages' is a complicated, uneven, and rather prosy poem, in which Eliot continues to say the same thing, with some progression, mainly in maritime imagery".

== See also ==
- East Coker, the previous poem in the Four Quartets
- Little Gidding, the final poem in the Four Quartets
