= Hundred of Houndsborough =

Historical Hundred of Somerset, England

Houndsborough Hundred
- Area
- 18,890 acres (7,640 ha)
- History
  - Created: Before 1086
- Status: Hundred
- Subdivisions
  - Type: Parishes
  - Units: Barwick, Chilton Cantelo, Chinnock (East, Middle, and West), Chiselborough, Closworth, Coker, Hardington Mandeville, Haselbury Plucknett, Norton-under-Hamdon, Odcombe, Pendomer, North Perrott, and Sutton Bingham

The Hundred of Houndsborough is one of the 40 historical Hundreds in the ceremonial county of Somerset, England, dating from before the Norman conquest during the Anglo-Saxon era although exact dates are unknown. Each hundred had a 'fyrd', which acted as the local defence force and a court which was responsible for the maintenance of the frankpledge system. They also formed a unit for the collection of taxes. The role of the hundred court was described in the Dooms (laws) of King Edgar. The name of the hundred was normally that of its meeting-place.

It is also known as Houndsborough Barwick and Coker Hundred.

There were 11 places listed at the time of the Domesday Book, however at the time the hundreds were called Hundesbera and Licget or Liet. Licget or Liet. It was also called Coker Hundred at a later time.

It consisted of the ancient parishes of: Barwick, Chilton Cantelo, Chinnock (East, Middle, and West), Chiselborough, Closworth, Coker, Hardington Mandeville, Haselbury Plucknett, Norton-under-Hamdon, Odcombe, Pendomer, North Perrott, and Sutton Bingham. It covered an area of 18,890 acres (7,640 ha).

The importance of the hundred courts declined from the seventeenth century. By the 19th century several different single-purpose subdivisions of counties, such as poor law unions, sanitary districts, and highway districts sprang up, filling the administrative role previously played by parishes and hundreds. Although the Hundreds have never been formally abolished, their functions ended with the establishment of county courts in 1867 and the introduction of districts by the Local Government Act 1894.
