= Church of All Saints, Sutton Bingham =

Church in Somerset, England

Church of All Saints
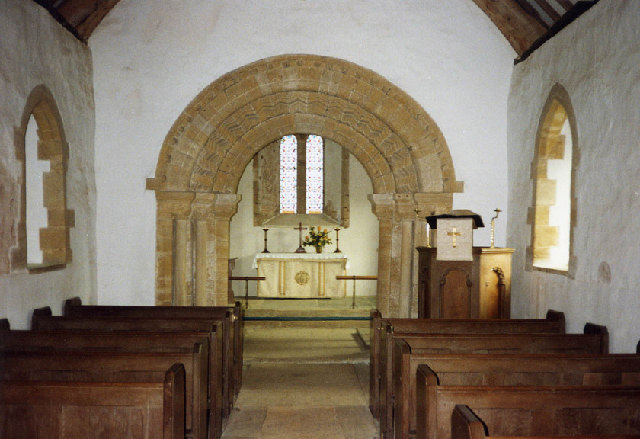

- Location within Somerset
- 50°53′51″N 2°38′37″W
- Location: Sutton Bingham, Closworth, Somerset, England

History
- Built: 12th century

Listed Building – Grade I
- Official name: Church of All Saints
- Designated: 19 April 1961
- Reference no.: 1057236

The Church of All Saints in Sutton Bingham in the civil parish of Closworth, Somerset, England, dates from the 12th and 13th centuries and has been designated as a Grade I listed building.

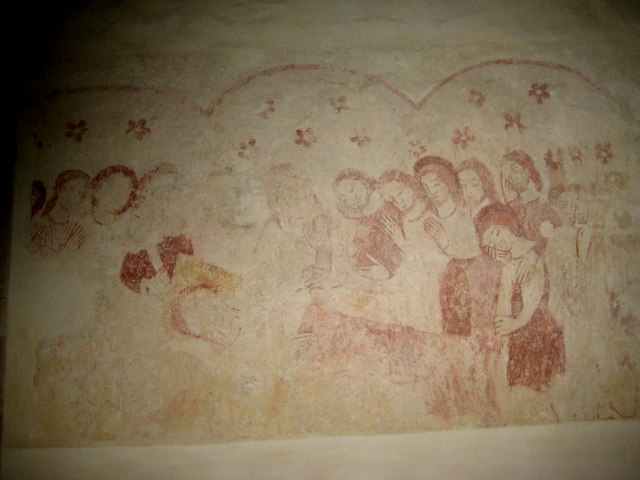
Death of the Virgin: Wall painting in the nave.

The interior includes a series of 14th-century wall paintings, including, in the Chancel, the Coronation of the Virgin, and several bishops and saints. There is a fine Romanesque chancel arch, shown at right. On the north wall of the nave is a portrayal of the Death of the Virgin (pictured below right). The murals were whitewashed during the Reformation and remained obscured until they were rediscovered in the 1860s.

The small belfry contains two bells, one dates from around 1250 and the other is from 1685.

The church is close to the shore of Sutton Bingham Reservoir, built in the 1950s.

== Parish status ==
The church is in a joint parish with

- St Mary's Church, East Chinnock
- St Michael and All Angels' Church, East Coker
- St Mary's Church, Hardington Mandeville
- St Roch's Church, Pendomer
- All Saints' Church, Closworth
- St Martin of Tours' Church, West Coker

== See also ==
- List of Grade I listed buildings in South Somerset
- List of towers in Somerset
- List of ecclesiastical parishes in the Diocese of Bath and Wells
