= East Coker (poem) =

1940 poem by T. S. Eliot

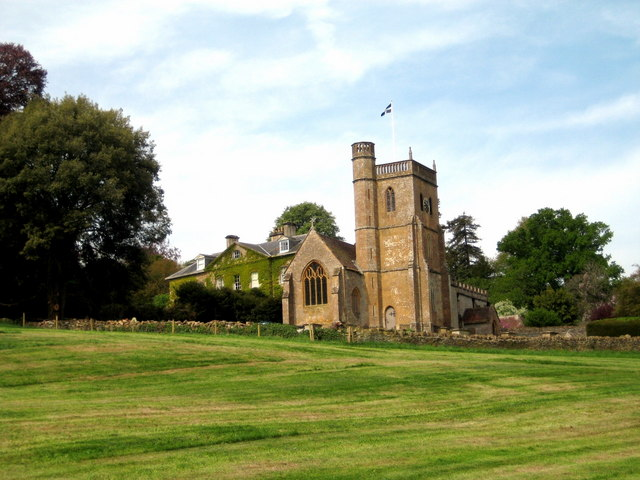
Coker Court and the parish church in East Coker, Somerset

East Coker is the second poem of T. S. Eliot's Four Quartets. It was started as a way for Eliot to get back into writing poetry and was modelled after Burnt Norton. It was finished during early 1940 and printed in the UK in the Easter edition of the 1940 New English Weekly, and in the US in the May 1940 issue of Partisan Review. The title refers to a village in Somerset that was connected to his Eliot family ancestry and where Eliot's ashes were placed in St Michael and All Angels' Church, East Coker.

The poem discusses time and disorder within nature that is the result of humanity following only science and not the divine. Leaders are described as materialistic and unable to understand reality. The only way for mankind to find salvation is through pursuing the divine by looking inwards and realising that humanity is interconnected. Only then can people understand the universe.

== Background ==
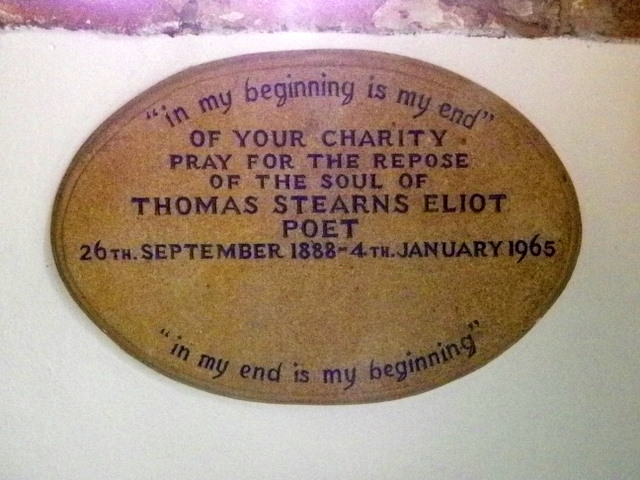
Memorial plaque in St Michael and All Angels' Church, East Coker

In 1939, T. S. Eliot thought that he would be unable to continue writing poetry. In an attempt to see if he could still, he started copying aspects of Burnt Norton and substituted another place: East Coker, a place that Eliot visited in 1937 with the parish church, where his ashes were later kept. The place held a particular importance to Eliot and family because their ancestor, Andrew Eliot, left the village to travel to America in 1669. A plaque in the church invites prayers for the soul of "Thomas Stearns Eliot, poet".

He managed to complete two sections by February 1940, but finished the rest during that month. John Davy Hayward, Herbert Read and others helped review and edit it. East Coker was published in the March 1940 New English Weekly for its Easter edition. It was later reprinted May and June, and it was published on its own by Faber and Faber in September. With the completion of the poem, Eliot began creating the Four Quartets as a series of four poems based on the same theme with Burnt Norton as the first in the series and East Coker as the second.

== Poem ==
East Coker is described as a poem of late summer, earth, and faith. As in the other poems of the Four Quartets, each of the five sections holds a theme that is common to each of the poems: time, experience, purgation, prayer, and wholeness. The time theme is stated in the first section as "In my beginning is my end" which, given proper attention, might prove to lead into the eternal moment. The first section reflects on how things rise, fall, and are reborn, drawing on images of countryside houses built and destroyed, of rural life, seasons, traditional rituals, music and dance, and honoring the dead to evoke the passage of time. The poet emphasizes how life is intertwined with death and human actions are part of an eternal rhythm.

The second section discusses disorder within nature, which is opposite to the discussion of order within nature found in the second section of Burnt Norton. Also, rational knowledge itself is described as being inadequate for explaining reality. Those who pursue only reason and science are ignorant. Even our progress is not progress as we continue to repeat the same errors as the past. The poet dismisses "the wisdom of old men", and says he wants to hear of their "folly". "The only wisdom we can hope to acquire", the poet claims, "is the wisdom of humility: humility is endless."

The third section discusses the rulers of secular society and their flaws, within a meditation on mortality. All people, regardless of status, encounter death and the unknown, symbolized by the dark. Images of "running streams, and winter lightning. The wild thyme unseen and the wild strawberry" are featured. The tone is somber, and the poet urges the soul to be still and wait in faith. In this stillness lies hope for spiritual insight, but it must come from embracing the darkness and waiting without expectation; transformation and enlightenment come from surrender and acceptance. Here, the poet interrupts the flow of the poem to ask the reader in an informal tone if they want him to repeat his insights.

The fourth, which is a formal section, deploys a series of Baroque paradoxes in the context of the Good Friday mass. One such paradox is the "wounded surgeon", a Christ-like figure who heals through painful interventions, within a "hospital" that encompasses "the whole Earth". The fourth section contemplates humanity's need to endure suffering and purification to find oneness, spiritual healing, renewal and salvation, evoking intense imagery of blood.

This past manner of paradoxes is regarded ironically by the poet in the fifth section as he looks back on his period of experimentation in "the years of l'entre deux guerres" as "largely wasted". He welcomes approaching old age as a new opportunity to find renewal, although it might only be a rediscovery of "what has been lost and found and lost again". Life complexifies as one grows older, and the world becomes "stranger" and more interconnected; real wisdom comes from recognizing the fleeting nature of individual moments and understanding broader patterns of life and history.

Despite the poem's doubt and darkness, a note of hope is struck by the first line of the fifth section, "So here I am in the middle way". This refers to the first line of Dante's Inferno, "Midway in our life's journey, I went astray". Although the descent is predicated on going astray, so is persevering beyond it into the light. The poet encourages spiritual exploration, especially for older people, suggesting that true understanding comes from embracing both stillness and movement. The poet evokes imagery of light, darkness, and the sea to reflect the soul's journey, searching for deeper communion and unity; he ends, "in my end is my beginning."

== Themes ==
East Coker gives a message of hope that the English communities would survive through World War II. In a letter dated 9 February 1940, Eliot stated, "We can have very little hope of contributing to any immediate social change; and we are more disposed to see our hope in modest and local beginnings, than in transforming the whole world at once... We must keep alive aspirations which can remain valid throughout the longest and darkest period of universal calamity and degradation." The poem also relied on the war as a way to connect to Eliot's idea that there was a united humanity. In particular, Stephen Spender claimed that "the war modified [Eliot's] attitude by convincing him that there was a Western cause to be positively defended. And after the war there was a Germany to be brought back within the Western tradition".

The poem served as a sort of opposite to the popular idea that The Waste Land served as an expression of disillusionment after World War I, even though Eliot never accepted this interpretation. World War II itself has a direct mention in only a few of Eliot's writings. However, World War II does affect the poem, especially with the disruption caused by the war being reflected within the poem as a disruption of nature and heaven. The poem describes society in ways similar to The Waste Land, especially with its emphasis on death and dying. The place is connected to where Eliot's family originates, and, as such, is also the place where his family will symbolically end. In the second part of the poem, nature is experiencing disorder, and it is suggested that humans too may burn, and also that reason, knowledge, and science cannot save people. The errors of our past become the reasons for war and conflict and we need to become humble in order to escape the destruction. However, darkness consumes the rulers of the world and society. This is, in part, due to Adam's fall, and the resulting concept of original sin. Christ is our savior and we need to seek redemption to overcome our human failings. Eliot states that he has been involved with fighting for humanity and trying to help mankind learn what is important. Only through Christ is man able to be redeemed.

In a twist from expectation, Eliot's poem suggests that old men should go out and explore. He warns that people should trade wisdom for pointless experience and argues that men should explore human experience itself. This concept is hinted of in The Waste Land and draws from the ideas within Dante's Convivio. Dante argues that old men are supposed to return to God and describes the process in a way similar to the travels of Odysseus. Unlike Homer's hero, Dante argues that men should not travel in the material world but in the spiritual world. Both Dante and Eliot put forth a similar view to Augustine of Hippo when they focus on internal travels. Through these travels, mankind is able to have faith in salvation and able to see that there is more to the world than darkness. Eliot explains within the poem that we are all interconnected through time and that we must realise this. Only through this realisation is mankind able to understand the truth of the universe. This, in turn, would allow humanity to break free from the burden of time. As Russell Kirk explains: "That end, for those who apprehend a reality superior to 'birth, copulation, and death'—a reality transcending the rhythms of physical nature—is to know God and enjoy Him forever."

Family and family history also play an important role in the poem. Eliot found information on his family from the book A Sketch of the Eliot Family (1887), which described how Eliot's family lived in East Coker for 200 years. When Andrew Eliot left, he disrupted the family history. Similarly, Eliot broke from his own family when he travelled away from his family, a family that he saw was declining. Within the poem, Eliot emphasises the need for a journey and the need for inward change.

== Sources ==
According to Eliot the poetic aspects of the poem are grounded in the tradition of John Cleveland, Edward Benlowes, William Blake, and W. B. Yeats's early work. Additionally, many of the images are connected to the poetry of Stéphane Mallarmé. In terms of theology, Eliot is orthodox in his theory and relies primarily on the writings of St Augustine. There are some additional influences from the works of Thomas Browne and John of the Cross. In applying these views upon society, Eliot was heavily influenced by the writings of Christopher Dawson and Dawson's reliance on understanding God as the first step to a better society.

Besides the many literary sources, Eliot also draws on his personal feelings and experience, especially on the great stress that he felt while composing the poem. Similarly, Eliot used the image of pilgrims coming to America and the stories of them that were common throughout his childhood. In particular, his mother wrote poems about the pilgrims arriving in New England, and Eliot found information related to his family's history in A Sketch of the Eliot Family.

== Reception ==
East Coker sold almost 12,000 copies during its initial publication. Eliot's response was to claim that its popularity proved that it was a bad poem. Regardless of the truthfulness of the statement, he enjoyed the fact that the poem could inspire people during the war. Upon receiving an essay from a schoolboy analysing East Coker, Eliot wrote a complimentary reply, praising the boy's review despite his interpretation of the poem differing from Eliot's. Eliot's friend, Emily Hale, liked the poem so much that she read the poem to her Smith College students "as if it were a love-letter from God".

Early reviews focused on discussing the poem in terms of its content and not its style. In the Southern Review, James Johnson Sweeney, Spring 1941, and Curist Bradford, Winter 1944, discussed paraphrases of the poems and the sources of various passages. However, Andrews Wanning, Spring 1941, stated that Burnt Norton was a better poem than East Coker and that "'Burnt Norton' is a poem of suggestion, 'East Coker' a poem of argument and explanation". Another American critic, Delmore Schwartz, did not appreciate the tone within East Coker, especially that expressed in the fifth section.
