= Pendomer =

Village in Somerset, England

Coordinates: 50.8919°N 2.6803°W

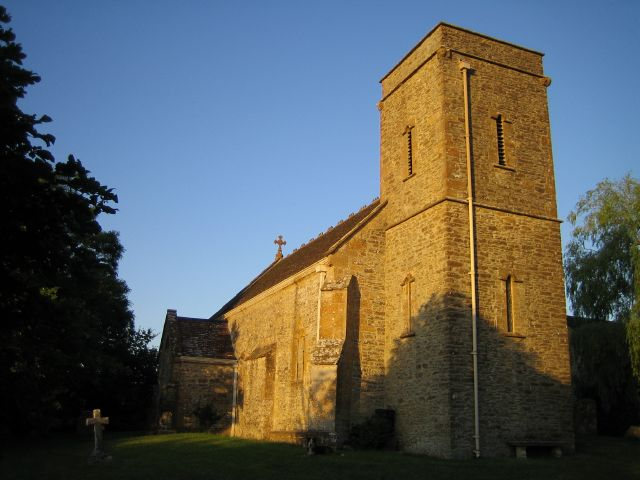

- Location within Somerset
- Civil parish: Closworth
- Unitary authority: Somerset
- Ceremonial county: Somerset
- Region: South West
- Country: England
- Sovereign state: United Kingdom
- UK Parliament: Yeovil

Pendomer is a village and former parish in the parish of Closworth, 4.5 miles south-west of Yeovil, in the county of Somerset, England, and on the border with Dorset.

== Twentieth-century administrative changes ==
=== Civil parish ===
In 1931, the parish had a population of 54. On 1 April 1933, the civil parish of Pendomer was united with that of Closworth and Sutton Bingham.

=== Ecclesiastical parish ===
In 1906, the benefices of Pendomer and Sutton Bingham were united to form the benefice of Pendomer with Sutton Bingham.

In 1969, this amalgam was divided, and the historical parish of Pendomer was united with Hardington Mandeville to form the benefice of Hardington Mandeville with Pendomer.

In 1981, the benefice of Hardington Mandeville with Pendomer was united with the benefice of East Chinnock.

== Geography ==
In 1919, the parish covered 1,114 acres. The contiguous parishes were Hardington Mandeville, East Coker, and Halstock.

The village of Pendomer stands at the end of a no through road, with access via Hardington, East Coker, and Halstock.

The surrounding vale is on Fuller's Earth Clay, which can be sticky after prolonged rainfall.

Birt's Hill, which is over 500 feet above sea level, was, in 1887, used to fire signal rockets to celebrate Queen Victoria's Golden Jubilee.

Other high ground is at Kit Hill (336), Pen Hill (365), and Abbot's Hill (c. 400).

"Broad River," a tributary of the River Parrett, begins in the fields south of the village.

Pen Wood lies on the northern slope of Birt's Hill. In 1958, the Forestry Commission bought the wood (which covered 242 acres) along with other land in Pendomer, East Coker, and Sutton Bingham. Between 1964 and 1967, the Commission cleared and replanted 80% of the area, leaving the remainder to conserve the flora and fauna.

The railway line between Exeter and London Waterloo runs through the parish.

The Macmillan Way Abbotsbury-Langport Link crosses the parish diagonally from northwest to southeast, intersecting with the village.

== History ==
The Domesday Book has an entry for Pendomer under the name "Penne." In the 12th century, "domer" was added to denote ownership by the Domer family.

Pendomer's tithe map was surveyed by William Wadham of Martock in 1840.

The railway line was built between 1858 and 1860. The single track line was opened on 19 July 1860, and subsequently improved to double lines, which was opened on 1 June 1866. Two ganger's cottages stood near the bridge at Kit Hill until their demolition in the late 1960s.

During the 19th and early 20th century, the Helyar/Heneage family of Coker Court owned much of the parish. This family also held the advowson of the church until 1958.

In the 19th and early 20th century, the farms in the parish comprised Abbot's Hill, Bryant's, Grove, Kit Hill, Lower Pen, Manor, Parsonage, and Pen Hill.

A school opened in the village in 1875. In the 1880s, it closed and the village children were sent to East Coker School instead.

During the Second World War, Austin, Arthur, and Alan Whetham (three brothers born in the village) and John Philip Jones (of Pen Hill Farm) made up half of the top secret "Coker Patrol", part of Churchill's clandestine resistance network. Alan Whetham later joined the Royal Electrical and Mechanical Engineers and was killed in action in Belgium in February 1945.

The population as recorded by the decennial census was as follows:

	Males	Females	Total
1801	48	47	95
1811	37	41	78
1821	38	32	70
1831	52	46	98
1841	47	34	81
1851	45	33	78
1861	48	48	96
1871	44	47	91
1881	35	34	69
1891	39	33	72
1901	25	29	54
1911	30	21	51
1921	38	33	71
1931	31	23	54

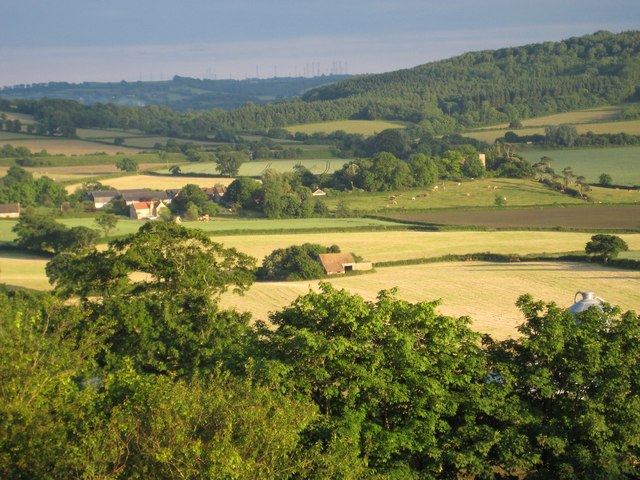
Looking southeast from Pen Lane towards Pendomer village and Birt's Hill.

== Literary references ==
In Thomas Hardy's poem, "At Wynyard's Gap", the unnamed gentleman tells his female hunting companion that the hounds have headed in full cry "Towards Pen Wood...and bear towards the Yeo."

== Notable people ==
Pendomer Rectory was the childhood home of Brigadier-General Arthur Beaumont Helyar C.B.E. (1858-1933), of the Royal Artillery, whose commands included the Territorial Artillery (Lowland Division) Scotland between 1908 and 1912, the artillery of the 13th Division in Egypt in 1915, and the artillery of the 10th Division in Greece and on the Bulgarian frontier in 1915-16.

His grave is in Pendomer churchyard, close to those of his parents, brother, and two of his sisters.
