= Helyer =

Helyer is a surname. Notable people with the surname include:

- William Allen alias Helyer (fl. 1550s), MP for Westbury (UK Parliament constituency)
- Richard Helyer (died 1446), English Archdeacon

== See also ==
- Heller (surname)
- Helyar
