= Meditation (writing) =

Type of written work

A meditation (derived from the Latin meditatio, from a verb meditari, meaning "to think, contemplate, devise, ponder") is a written work or discourse intended to express its author's reflections, or to guide others in contemplation. Often they are an author's musings or extended thoughts on deeper philosophical or religious questions. In the case of Marcus Aurelius, writing was therapeutic. He would use writing as a form of therapy, often aiming to write short and memorable paragraphs. Meditative writing is reflective, involving the conscious observance and manipulation of one's mind for beneficial purposes. Writing focuses one's mind on the task at hand, restructuring thought processes. Descartes' Meditations afford a famous example. In Meditations, Descartes hopes to have his readers follow along in meditative exercises. He hopes readers read the entire Meditations, rather than just a part, explaining that he wants people reading it to be in serious deliberation. Descartes's Meditations offer particular insight into this style of writing, letting readers know that Meditations is meant to delve into the various aspects of self, and our ideas of ourselves. He examined seemingly unconscious ideas of the mind, and, in bringing them to consciousness, clarifies them in the readers own mind. Meditations, according to Descartes, are not meant to be an idle task, but should go on to affect all aspects of life: from social interactions to how we perceive ourselves. There are other varieties of meditative writing. Some view meditations more like writing therapy, a way to vent out and deal with one's emotions, whereas Descartes and the Stoics viewed meditations as a form of contemplation.

Examples of meditations are:

- Thomas Traherne's Centuries of Meditations
- T. S. Eliot's Four Quartets
- Meditations, a series of personal writings by Marcus Aurelius, Roman Emperor 161–180 CE, setting forth his ideas on Stoic philosophy
- Meditations on First Philosophy by René Descartes
