= Sutton Bingham Reservoir =

Reservoir in Somerset, UK

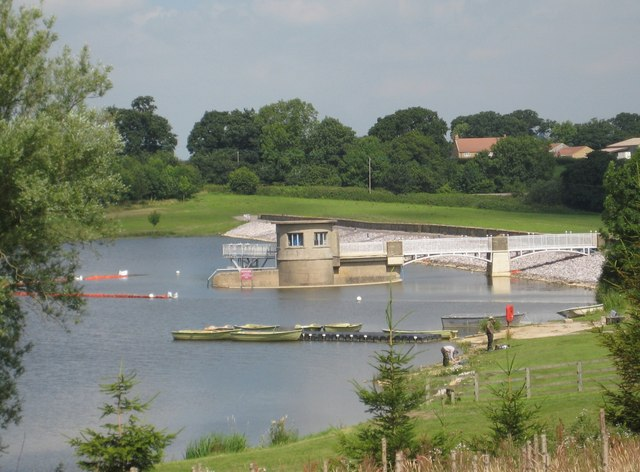

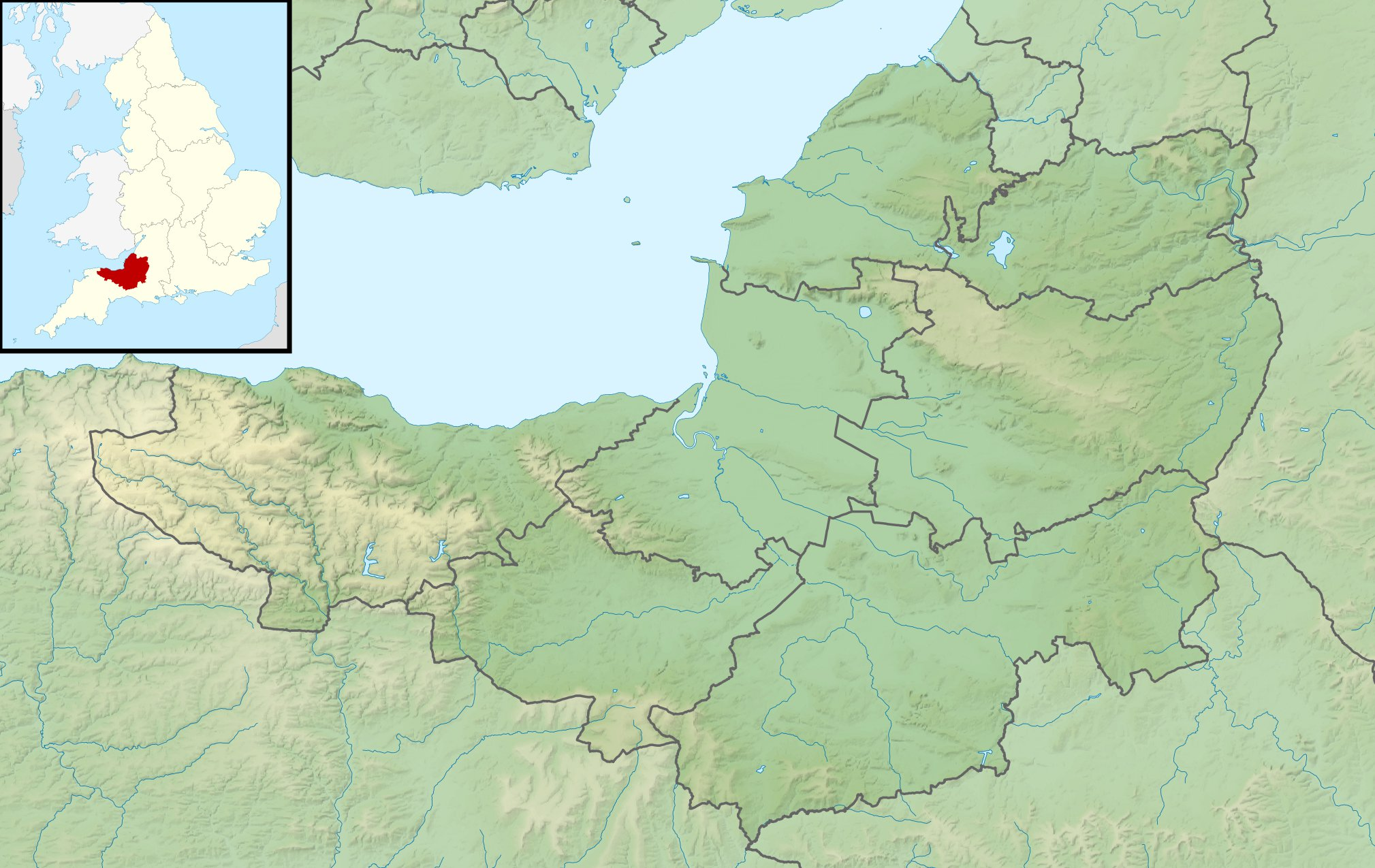
- Location within Somerset
- Location: Sutton Bingham, Closworth, Somerset, England
- Coordinates: 50°53′54″N 2°38′33″W
- Built: 1950s
- Surface area: 142 acres (57 ha)

Sutton Bingham Reservoir is a reservoir near the village of Sutton Bingham in the civil parish of Closworth, Somerset, England.

The reservoir was built in the 1950s to supply water to Yeovil. The remains of Sutton Mill are under the water, and close to the shore is the 12th-century Church of All Saints.

It now provides an environment for overwintering wildfowl and migrant birds including the osprey. It is also used for fishing, and sailing by Sutton Bingham Sailing Club and the Sutton Bingham and District Canoe Club.
