= St Martin of Tours' Church, West Coker =

St Martin of Tours’ Church, West Coker
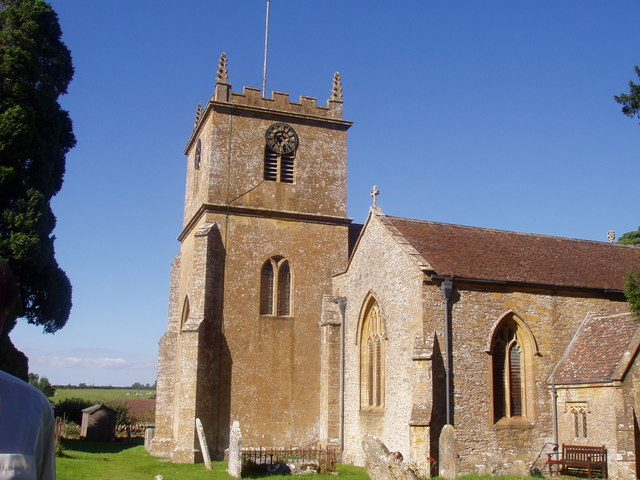
- St Martin of Tours’ Church, West Coker
- St Martin of Tours’ Church, West Coker
- 50°55′10.71″N 2°41′20.65″W
- Location: West Coker
- Country: England
- Denomination: Church of England
- Churchmanship: Broad Church

History
- Dedication: St Martin of Tours

Architecture
- Heritage designation: Grade II* listed

Administration
- Province: Province of Canterbury
- Diocese: Diocese of Bath and Wells
- Archdeaconry: Wells
- Deanery: Yeovil
- Parish: West Coker

St Martin of Tours' Church, West Coker is a Grade II* listed parish church in the Church of England in West Coker, Somerset.

== History ==
The church dates from the 13th century. It was rebuilt between 1863 and 1864 under the supervision of the architect, James Mountford Allen of Crewkerne. The contractor was Robert Bartlett and Son of West Coker. The north and south arcades were rebuilt with the addition of one bay westward on the north side. The chancel arch was rebuilt. The plaster between the rafters of the chancel was stencilled and emblazoned by Mr Stansell of Taunton. The chancel was fitted with oak stalls, and the floor tiled with encaustic tiles from Maw & Co. The reredos was made by A.W. Blacker of Dawlish. The church reopened on 14 October 1864.

== Organ ==
A new organ was installed in 1885. The gift of Miss Wood, sister-in-law of the Rector, it cost £500 (equivalent to £55,550 in 2025) and was built by Nicholson and Lord of Walsall.

== Bells ==
The tower contains a ring of 8 bells. Four dating from 1770, and one of 1779 were cast by Thomas II Bilbie of the Bilbie family. and the remaining three are by Llewellins and James and date from 1911.

== Parish status ==
The church is in a joint parish with

- St Mary's Church, East Chinnock
- St Mary's Church, Hardington Mandeville
- St Roch's Church, Pendomer
- All Saints’ Church, Closworth
- St Michael and All Angels' Church, East Coker
- All Saints’ Church, Sutton Bingham

== See also ==
- List of ecclesiastical parishes in the Diocese of Bath and Wells
