= Barwick, Somerset =

Village in Somerset, England

Coordinates: 50.9233°N 2.6205°W

Barwick
- Location within Somerset
- Population: 1,221 (2011)
- OS grid reference: ST564139
- Unitary authority: Somerset
- Ceremonial county: Somerset
- Region: South West
- Country: England
- Sovereign state: United Kingdom
- Post town: YEOVIL
- Postcode district: BA22
- Dialling code: 01935
- Police: Avon and Somerset
- Fire: Devon and Somerset
- Ambulance: South Western
- UK Parliament: Yeovil

Barwick is a village and parish in Somerset, England, about 2 miles (3.2 km) south of Yeovil and on the border with Dorset. The parish, which includes the village of Stoford, has a population of 1,221.

== History ==
The earliest signs of habitation in the area were the relics of a Bronze Age burial which were found in 1826, a little to the north of the village of Stoford, which may be a Saxon name derived from Stow-Ford.

Settlement may go back as far as Saxon times, the earliest mention of Barwick being in 1185. In the Middle Ages, Stoford was shown as a new town and in an Inquisition or survey of 1273 there were 74 burgages each paying 10d (ten pence) a year. The total population of the borough in 1273 was probably over 500. Stoford kept its borough status for at least 300 years. A guildhall was mentioned in 1361 and there is proof of a separate borough court. There was still a 'borough of Stoford' in the musters of 1569.

The parish was part of the hundred of Houndsborough.

== Governance ==
The parish council is responsible for local issues. It sets an annual precept (local rate) to cover the council's operating costs and produces annual accounts for public scrutiny. The parish council evaluates local planning applications and works with the local police, district council officers, and neighbourhood watch groups on matters of crime, security and traffic. The parish council's role also includes initiating projects for the maintenance and repair of parish facilities, as well as consulting with the district council on the maintenance, repair and improvement of highways, drainage, footpaths, public transport and street cleaning. Conservation matters (including trees and listed buildings) and environmental issues are also the responsibility of the council.

For local government purposes, since 1 April 2023, the village comes under the unitary authority of Somerset Council. Prior to this, it was part of the non-metropolitan district of South Somerset, which was formed on 1 April 1974 under the Local Government Act 1972, having previously been part of Yeovil Rural District.

It is also part of the Yeovil county constituency represented in the House of Commons of the Parliament of the United Kingdom. It elects one Member of Parliament (MP) by the first past the post system of election. It was part of the South West England constituency of the European Parliament prior to Britain leaving the European Union in January 2020, which elected seven MEPs using the d'Hondt method of party-list proportional representation.

The civil parish was renamed Barwick and Stoford on 1 April 2018, and this is the title of the parish council.

== Barwick Park ==
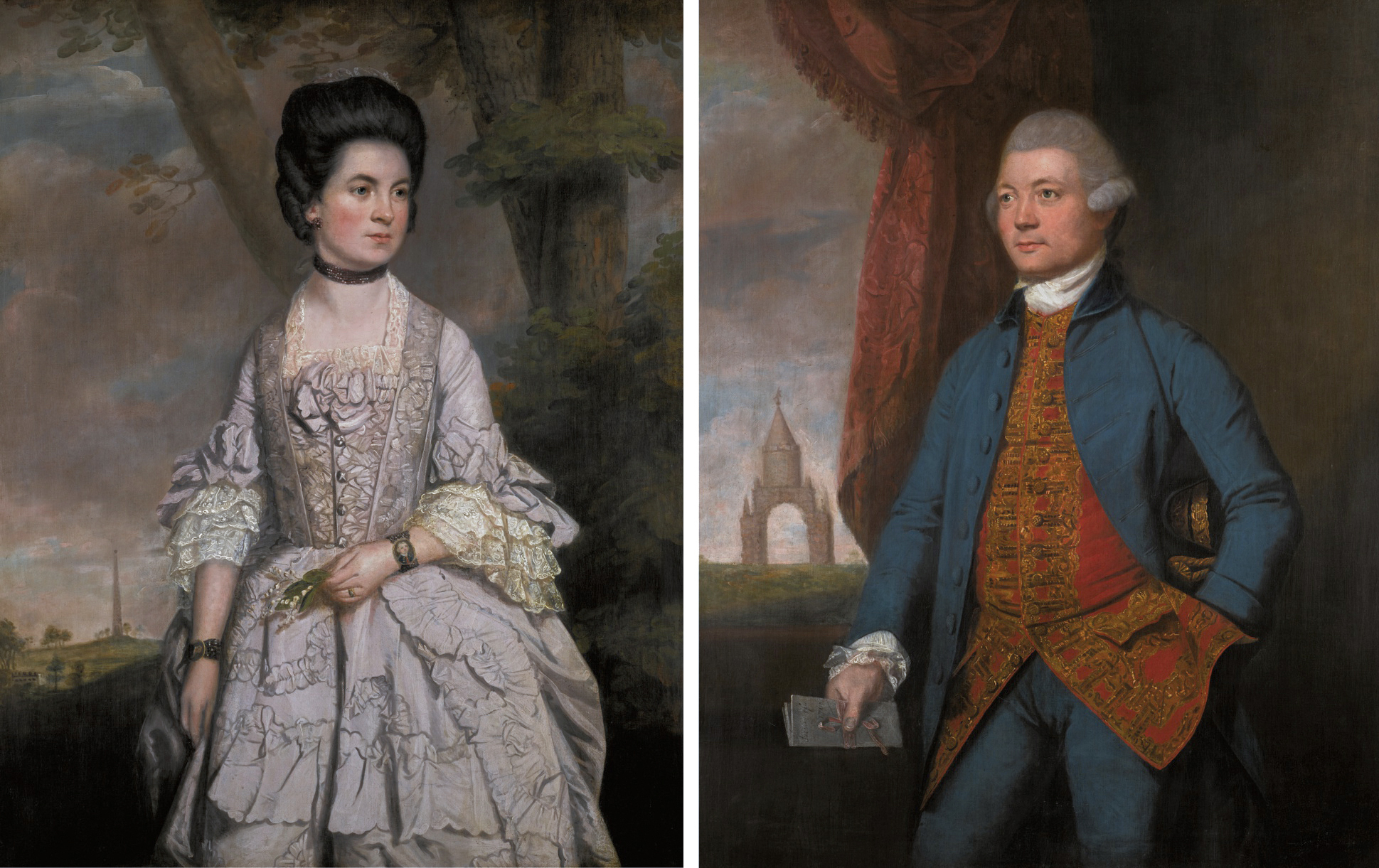
John and Grace Newman (Thomas Beach, 1768)

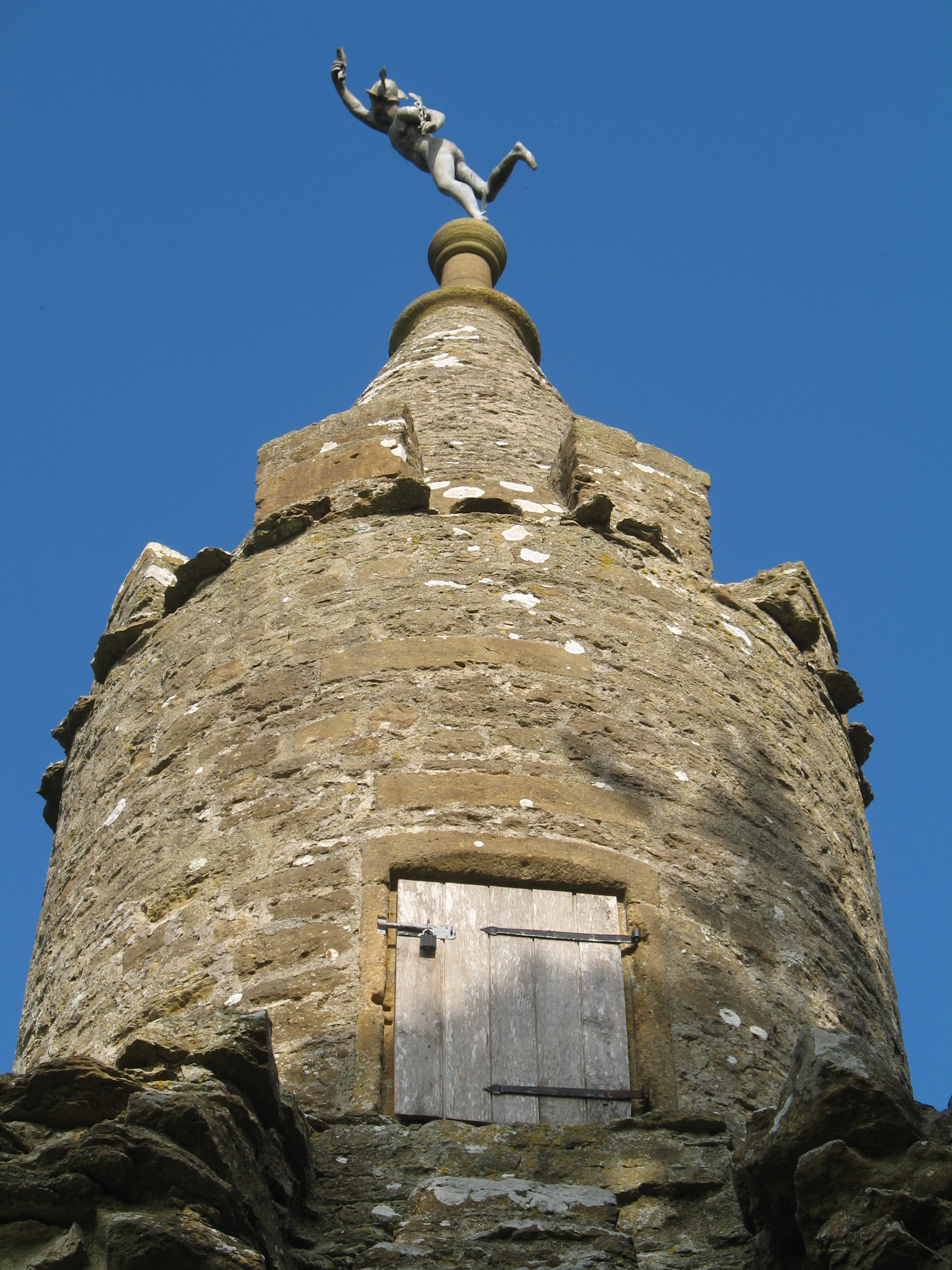
Jack the Treacle Eater, one of the Barwick follies

The estate originally formed part of the property of Syon Abbey, and passed through various hands after the Dissolution in the 1530s. The present house and park are thought to have been built in 1770 by John and Grace Newman, whose relations owned neighbouring Newton Surmaville.

The house was set in pleasure grounds containing a lake and grotto, while the surrounding parkland was ornamented with a Gothic lodge and a group of four follies. In the early 19th century the estate passed to Thomas Messiter, a barrister, who was John Newman's nephew and in 1830 the mansion was remodelled in a Jacobean Revival style. An orangery was constructed adjoining the north side at the same period. During the early 20th century the estate was let to various persons.

During World War II, it was the location of a prisoner of war camp, initially housing Italian prisoners from the Western Desert Campaign, and later German prisoners after the Battle of Normandy.

Following derequisition of the property, after the war, the Messiter family carried out considerable modernisation and repairs and took up residence.

At some point following this the property became a school known as Broadhembury College and remained so up until the end of the 1960s when the school changed hands. From the early 1970s through to the mid 1980s the mansion and surrounding grounds were let to Pagems Schools Ltd and Headmaster Major Arthur Gray for use as a privately run boarding school attracting boys from London, Liverpool, Bristol, Swansea and several other areas around the country. During this time further modifications took place that included a new classroom block, swimming pool and gymnasium. The school was also part of the Sea Cadet Corps, known as T.S. Gryphon with affiliations to HMS Hampshire (D06)|H.M.S. Hampshire and nearby RNAS Yeovilton H.M.S. Heron. The school closed around 1986/87 due to bankruptcy.

In the 1990s the estate was sold to a private owner, and substantial repairs were carried out to the house, orangery and landscape structures. The site remains in private ownership.

=== Barwick Park follies ===
Barwick Park boasts four follies. Locals say they were built to give the estate labourers work during a time of depression in the 1820s. They were possibly commissioned by George Messiter of Barwick to mark the park boundaries at the four cardinal points: Jack the Treacle Eater (a stone arch topped by a round tower) to the east, the Fish Tower in the north, Messiter's Cone (also known as the Rose Tower), which is 75 feet (23 m) high, at the west end and the Needle to the south. However, paintings of Barwick House in the 1780s, forty years before the 1820s depression, include two of the follies.

The follies collectively ranked fourth on Countryfile's 2009 list of "Britain's top 10 follies".

== Transport ==
The parish contains Yeovil Junction railway station, on the London–Exeter line.

== The church ==
The Church of Saint Mary Magdalene is just off the A37 at the western end of the village, about half a mile away from the main centre of population. The church was built before 1219 as a chapel of the minster church in Yeovil. It has been rebuilt and restored since, particularly in the 1850 when the chancel was rebuilt. There is still a weekly service. The ecclesiastical parish is now part of the benefice of Holy Trinity, Yeovil. The most architecturally significant features of the church are the bench ends, dating from 1533 - the eve of the English Reformation. The bench ends depict scenes from village life as well as typical pagan symbolism from that period such as the Green Man and the unicorn, a symbol of eternal life. There are also religious objects dating back much earlier, presumably from the church originally on the site, e.g. the Norman font.

The church has been designated by English Heritage as a Grade II* listed building.

== Sport ==
A short lived greyhound racing track was opened on Saturday 22 August 1931 at Barwick Field on Long Lane near Barwick Park. The racing was independent (not affiliated to the sports governing body the National Greyhound Racing Club) and was known as a flapping track, which was the nickname given to independent tracks. The race distance was 525 yards, the racing ended in early 1932.

== Gallery ==
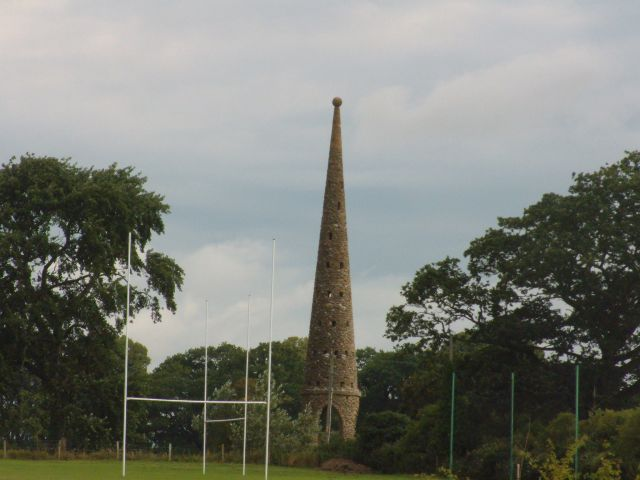
The Cone

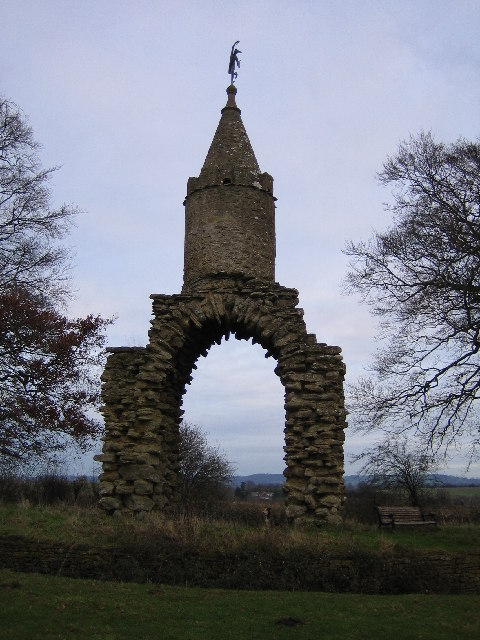
Jack the Treacle Eater

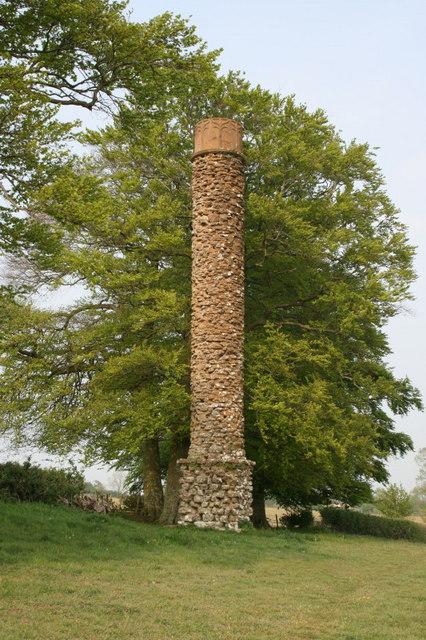
Fish Tower

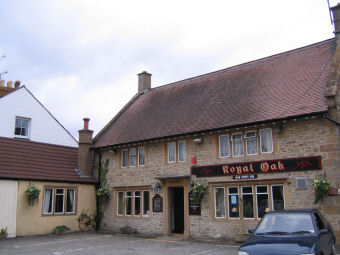
The Royal Oak in Stoford
