= St Michael and All Angels' Church, East Coker =

St Michael and All Angels’ Church, East Coker
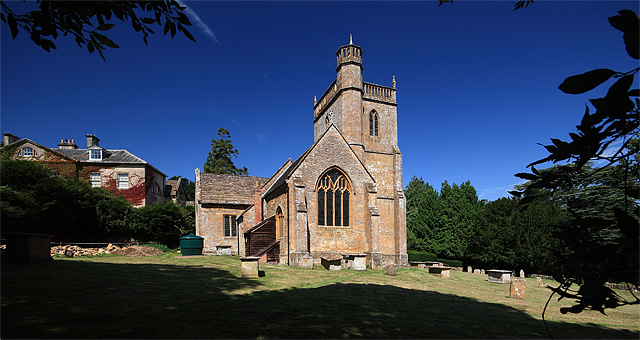
- St Michael and All Angels’ Church, East Coker
- 50°54′26.38″N 2°39′26.33″W
- Location: East Coker
- Country: England
- Denomination: Church of England
- Churchmanship: Broad Church
- Website: eastcokerchurch.org.uk

History
- Dedication: St Michael and All Angels

Architecture
- Heritage designation: Grade II* listed

Administration
- Province: Province of Canterbury
- Diocese: Diocese of Bath and Wells
- Archdeaconry: Wells
- Deanery: Yeovil
- Parish: East Coker

St Michael and All Angels’ Church is a Grade II* listed parish church in the Church of England in East Coker, Somerset.

== History ==
The church dates from the late 12th century, but much of the surviving fabric is 15th century. In the 14th century the rector was appointed by the Lord of the Manor at the adjoining Coker Court. The window of the south transept includes the coat of arms of the Helyar family who were the local lords, including William Helyar who became archdeacon of Barnstaple and built the Helyar Almshouses.

The central tower was replaced in 1791 by a north-east tower designed by Joseph Radford.

The brass eagle lectern was dedicated on Christmas Eve in 1898 in commemoration of the Diamond Jubilee of Queen Victoria's reign.

The church is noted as the resting place of the poet T. S. Eliot whose ashes were interred in 1965.

== Incumbents ==
Rectors up to Peter Falewell, after that, vicars

- Robert de St Nicolas 1297
- William de Middleton 1309
- Willaim de Weston 1344
- John de Southdon 1349
- Philip Le Doo 1349
- Robert de Bockton 1352
- Peter Falewell 1385
- Robert Box 1403
- Thomas Hitchecok 1403
- John Hoper 1406
- John Loder 1406
- Richard Spicer 1410
- Thomas Mapoudre 1437
- John Balam 1453
- John Rene 1453
- Robert Gefferey 1454
- William Pasley 1463
- John Godefellow 1490
- John Ashe 1515
- Richard Elys 1515
- Robert Philipson 1523
- John Gold 1572
- William Buckland 1609
- William Ford 1618
- William Walwyn 1648
- Richard Gove 1661
- Lewis Geanes 1668
- Robert Paul 1672
- Michael Cory 1674
- John Stanbury 1684
- Richard Short 1698
- Peter Bellinger 1713
- Henry White 1716
- William Short 1755
- John Free D.D. 1756
- James Carrington 1791
- Rowland Huyshe 1825
- William Gee 1864
- Charles Powell 1877
- Herbert Candland 1921
- Maurice Bailey 1923
- Leonard G Coates 1931
- Ivor G Sanders 1940
- George E Mullard 1948
- David J Hunt 1979
- Roger Burt 2000
- Charles Hatton 2011

== Organ ==
The pipe organ is by E. Lifford and Co of Yeovil. A specification of the organ can be found on the National Pipe Organ Register.

== Bells ==
The tower contains a ring of 8 bells, all dating from 1770 or 1771 and cast by Thomas II Bilbie of the Bilbie family.

== Parish status ==
The church is in a joint parish with

- St Mary's Church, East Chinnock
- St Mary's Church, Hardington Mandeville
- St Roch's Church, Pendomer
- All Saints’ Church, Closworth
- St Martin of Tours' Church, West Coker
- All Saints' Church, Sutton Bingham

== See also ==
- List of ecclesiastical parishes in the Diocese of Bath and Wells
