= Helyar Almshouses =

17th century English almshouses

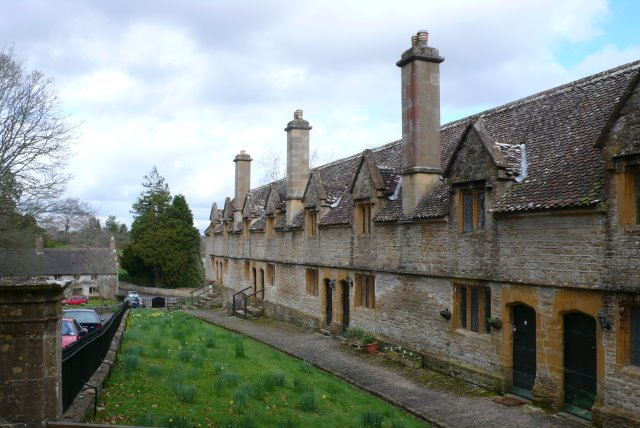

- Location within Somerset
- 50°54′30.93″N 2°39′23.32″W
- Location: East Coker, Somerset, England

History
- Built: 1640-1660
- Built for: Archdeacon Helyar

Site notes
- Restored: 19th century

Listed Building – Grade II
- Official name: Helyar Almshouses
- Designated: 19 April 1961
- Reference no.: 1345804

The Helyar Almshouses were erected between 1640 and 1660 by William Helyar Archdeacon of Barnstable of Coker Court, East Coker, Somerset, England.

The building work was interrupted by the plague of 1645 and the English Civil War, and the almshouses were not completed until 1660, by which time, the Archdeacon was dead, and the work was completed by his grandson (also William Helyar).

In 1868 the almshouses had an income of £46 per annum (equivalent to £4,497 in 2025). It still operates a charity and had an income of £9,313 in 2005.
