= William Helyar =

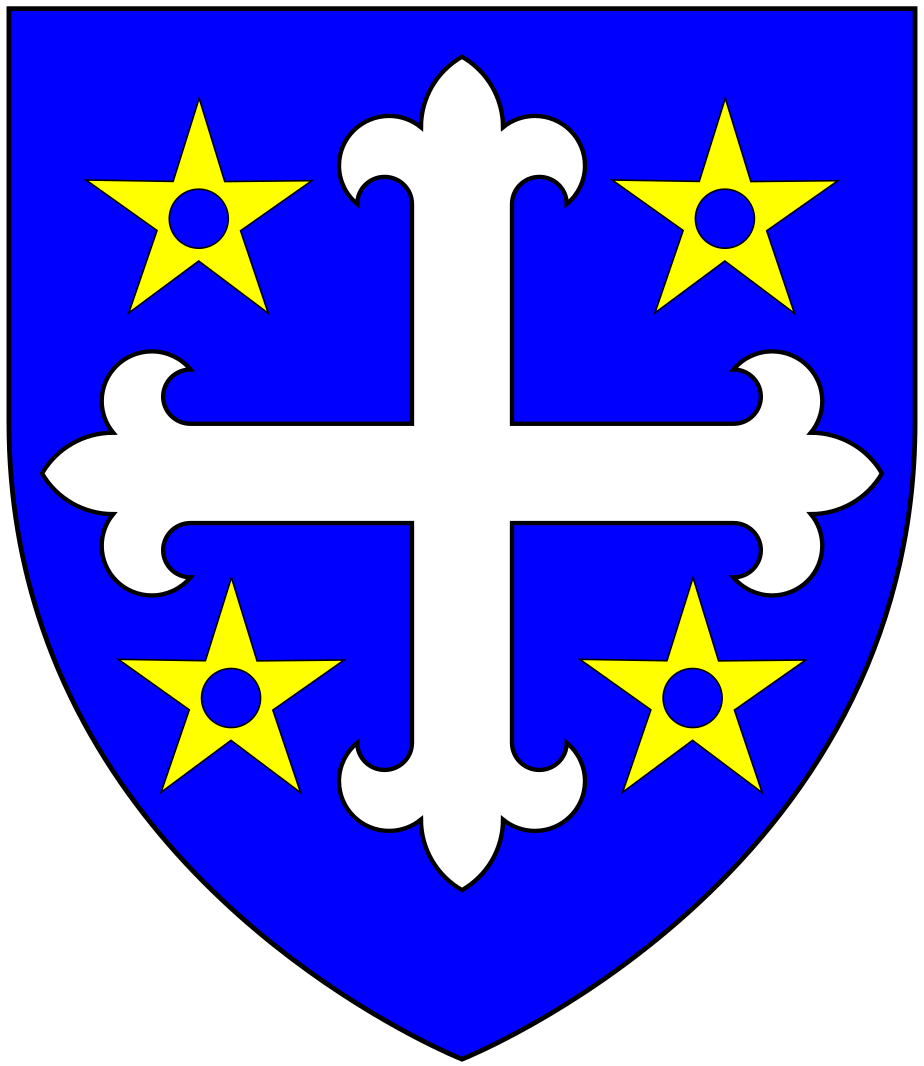
Arms of Helyar: Azure, a cross flory argent between four mullets pierced or

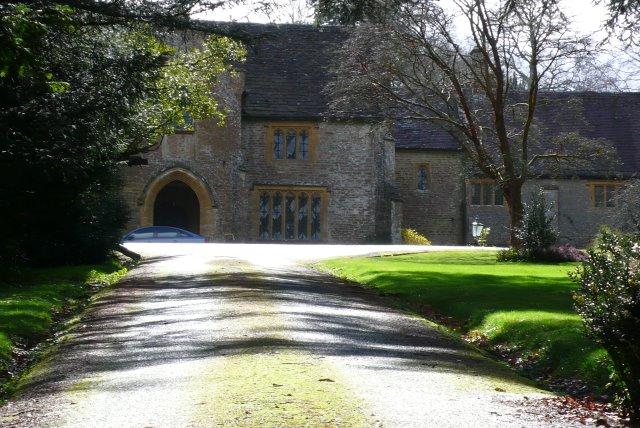
Coker Court

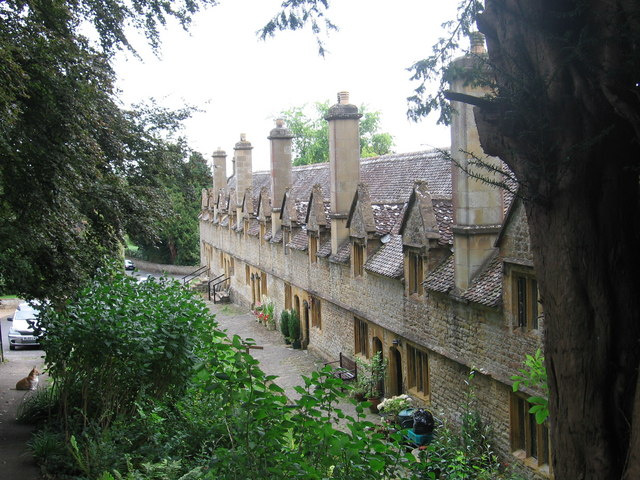
Helyar Almshouses

William Helyar (8 January 1559 – 21 November 1645) of Coker Court, East Coker, in Somerset, was Archdeacon of Barnstaple and a chaplain to Queen Elizabeth I.

== Biography ==
He was the son of William Helyar by his wife Alice Veale and was baptised on 8 January 1559 at St. Budeaux, Devon. He graduated M.A. from Exeter College, Oxford in 1587. His later clerical appointments included:

- Vicar in 1577 of Bickleigh, Devon
- Rector in 1582 of Dunchideock, Devon
- Rector in 1588 of Charlton, Devon
- Canon of Exeter Cathedral in 1596
- Vicar in 1602 of Heavitree, Devon
- Archdeacon of Barnstaple from 1605
- Rector of North Tawton, Devon, between 1610 and 1645

In 1616 he purchased Coker Court, the manor house of East Coker, Somerset, from Sir Edward Phelips. He started the construction of the Helyar Almshouses in East Coker in 1640, but died before their completion. They were finished by his grandson William Helyar.

During the Civil War, on 19 January 1642, he was dragged at midnight from his bed in Exeter by Roundheads and carried on board a ship, where he was detained until he consented to pay the sum of £800 (equivalent to £175,318 in 2023). He received a copy of the protection thus purchased:

"Whereas Archdeacon Helyar has submitted and sent eight hundred pounds to the parliament upon the propositions. These are therefore, to require all the forces of the parliament to take notice thereof and to protect him in his person, family, and goods, strictly charging and commanding that no man henceforth, molest or trouble him. January 19, 1642, signed, Jo. Northcote, Sam. Rolle” etc etc

=== Marriage and children ===
He married Mary Cary (died 1607), daughter of William Cary of Cockington, Devon, by whom he had children including:

- Henry Helyar (died 1634) who in 1621 married Christiana Cary (died 1634) daughter of William Cary (1576–1652), lord of the manor of Clovelly, Devon, JP for Devon, MP for Mitchell, Cornwall, in 1604. He predeceased his father. His son William Helyar (died 1697) thus succeeded his grandfather to the manor Coker Court in 1645.
- Elizabeth Helyar (christened 12 May 1591), who on 29 April 1606 married John Bridgeman, son of Thomas Bridgeman and later Bishop of Chester.
- William Helyar. Daughters: Mary (christened 25 April 1629), Phillis (baptism 1 February 1631) and Grace (christened 19 April 1634).
