= Closworth =

Village and civil parish in Somerset, England

Coordinates: 50.8923°N 2.6198°W

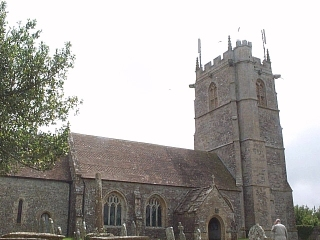
- Church of All Saints, Closworth

- Location within Somerset
- Population: 220 (2011)
- OS grid reference: ST565105
- Unitary authority: Somerset Council
- Ceremonial county: Somerset
- Region: South West
- Country: England
- Sovereign state: United Kingdom
- Post town: Yeovil
- Postcode district: BA22
- Dialling code: 01935
- Police: Avon and Somerset
- Fire: Devon and Somerset
- Ambulance: South Western
- UK Parliament: Yeovil

Closworth is a village and civil parish in Somerset, England, 5 miles (8.0 km) south of Yeovil, on the border with Dorset. The village has a population of 220.

The parish includes the villages of Pendomer and Sutton Bingham, the location for Sutton Bingham Manor, Sutton Bingham Sailing Club (SBSC) and Sutton Bingham and District Canoe Club (SBDCC). It sits on a reservoir of the same name owned by Wessex Water. It has an approximate population of 25.

== History ==
The village was named Clovesuurda meaning "homestead above the valley" in the Domesday Book of 1086, when it was the property of Robert, Count of Mortain. His son gave it to the newly formed priory at Montacute in 1102. After the Dissolution of the Monasteries the estate was bought by the Portmans of Orchard Portman who retained it into the 20th century.

The parish was part of the hundred of Houndsborough.

== Governance ==
The parish council has responsibility for local issues, including setting an annual precept (local rate) to cover the council's operating costs and producing annual accounts for public scrutiny. The parish council evaluates local planning applications and works with the local police, district council officers, and neighbourhood watch groups on matters of crime, security, and traffic. The parish council's role also includes initiating projects for the maintenance and repair of parish facilities, as well as consulting with the district council on the maintenance, repair, and improvement of highways, drainage, footpaths, public transport, and street cleaning. Conservation matters (including trees and listed buildings) and environmental issues are also the responsibility of the council.

For local government purposes, since 1 April 2023, the parish comes under the unitary authority of Somerset Council. Prior to this, it was part of the non-metropolitan district of South Somerset (established under the Local Government Act 1972). It was part of Yeovil Rural District before 1974.

It is also part of the Yeovil county constituency represented in the House of Commons of the Parliament of the United Kingdom. It elects one Member of Parliament (MP) by the first past the post system of election.

== Geography ==
The geology of the area is Cornbrash, the name applied to the uppermost member of the Bathonian stage of the Jurassic formation. The name was adopted by William Smith for a thin band of shelly limestone which, in the south of England, breaks up in the manner indicated. The Cornbrash is a very fossiliferous formation; the fauna indicates a transition from the Lower to the Middle Oolites, though it is probably more nearly related to that of the beds above than to those below.

== Churches ==
The Church of All Saints in Closworth village has 13th-century origins and is designated as a Grade II* listed building.

The Norman Church of All Saints in Sutton Bingham dates from the 12th and 13th centuries and has been designated as a Grade I listed building.

The Church of Saint Roch in Pendomer is 14th-century.

== Bellfounders ==
For nearly 200 years Closworth had a bell-foundry. Master bell-founders at Closworth included William Purdue I (active 1572–84), Thomas Purdue (active 1647–1691), Thomas Knight (active 1692–1714), William Knight (active 1709–47), William Elery (active 1732–57), Thomas Roskelly (active 1750–68), Richard Rock (active 1753–67) and James Smith (active 1762–67).
