= Coker Court =

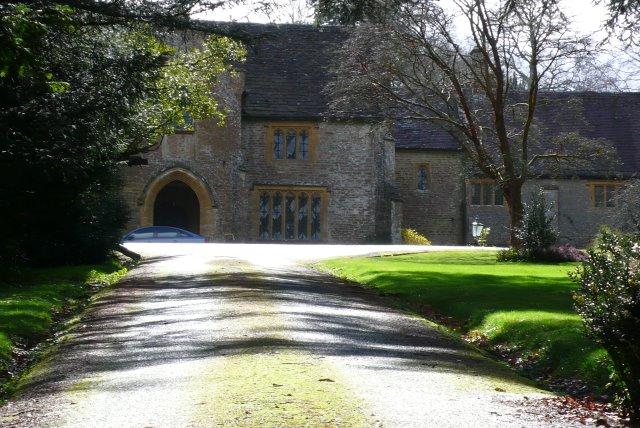

- Location within Somerset
- 50°54′25″N 2°39′33″W
- Location: East Coker, Somerset, England

History
- Built: 15th century

Listed Building – Grade I
- Official name: Coker Court
- Designated: 19 April 1961
- Reference no.: 1057176

Coker Court is a substantial manor house in East Coker, Somerset, England. It was built in the fifteenth and eighteenth centuries and has been designated as a Grade I listed building. It was erected by the Courtney family who were lords of the manor and rectors of the adjacent parish church. The building is constructed from locally quarried Hamstone with roofs composed of stone tiles.

== History ==
The Courtney family were lords of the manor in the 14th and 15th centuries and appointed the rectors of the adjacent St Michael and All Angels' Church. They built the present building, on the site of an earlier house during the early part of the 15th century. In 1616 it was bought by archdeacon Helyar who added to the structure of the building. William Helyar supported the king during the English Civil War. His grandson, another William Helyar, was Member of Parliament for Somerset in 1715. The Helyar family owned sugar plantations in Jamaica.

The MPs grandson, another William Helyar (died 1820; pictured), commissioned architect Joseph Dixon to design a new wing for the Court, in 1766.

The 18th-century portion was built by Sir William Chambers. The house is now divided into several properties.

== Architecture ==
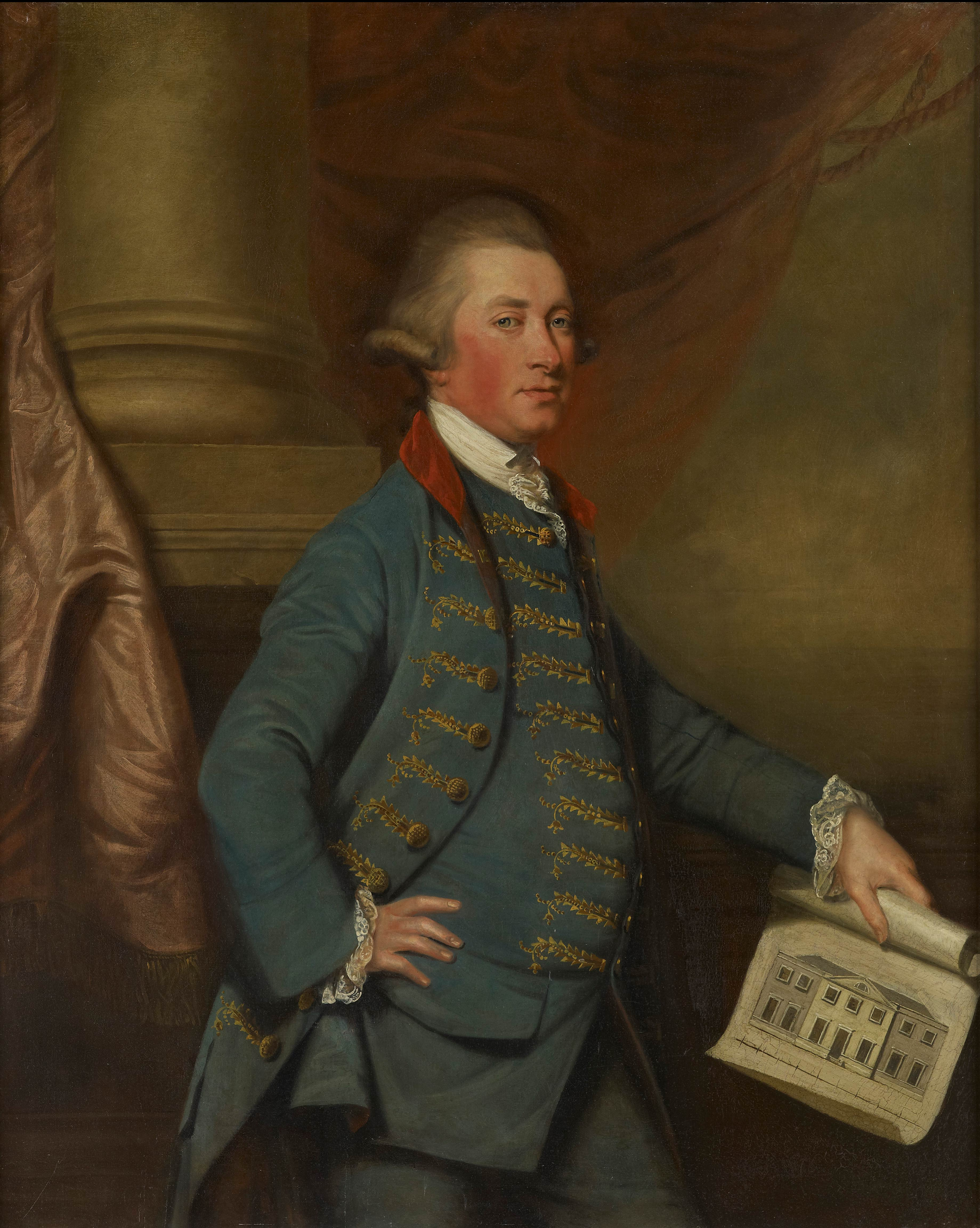
Portrait of William Helyar (died 1820), holding a design for the Georgian wing of Coker Court, Somerset by Thomas Beach, circa 1768

Coker Court is a manor house, constructed in the fifteenth century and now divided into several units. Major additions were made in the eighteenth century and further extensions in around 1900. The house is constructed of locally quarried Hamstone rubble with ashlar dressings, with roofs of stone tiles between coped gables. The extension is rendered and has a hipped roof. The chimney stacks are of stone, some of them rendered. The north front is the earliest part of the building, and has seven bays. The east front is the eighteenth-century structure and also has seven bays. To the south and west is the four-bay extension erected around 1900 as servants quarters, and now a separate dwelling house.

On the north front, bay 1 is the end of the eighteenth century addition and has a blind Venetian window while bay 2 has an oriel window, the two arched windows having tracery and diamond leaded panes. Bay 2 is separated from bay 3 by an angled buttress, and further full height buttresses separate bays 3, 4 and 5, which each have similar windows. Bay 6 has a projecting porch and is separated from bay 7 by another buttress. Bay 7 has twentieth century mullioned windows. The interior of the house has some interesting features including Chinese wallpaper and lacquerwork in some upstairs rooms. The house is a Grade I listed building, and the listing particulars state that it is "A very fine example in which either major portion would merit the high grading".

== Film ==
Part of the 1996 film Emma, based on the novel of the same name by Jane Austen, was shot on location at Coker Court.

== See also ==
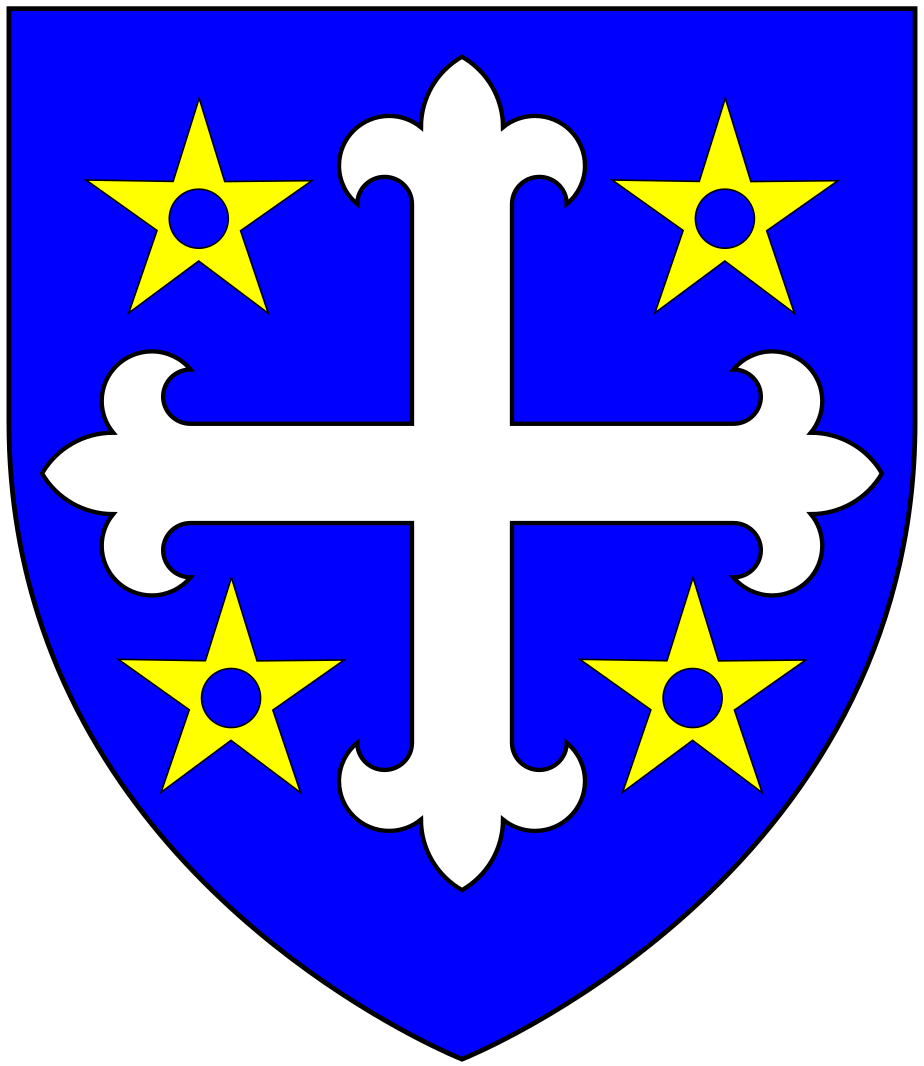
Arms of Helyar: Azure, a cross flory argent between four mullets pierced or

- List of Grade I listed buildings in South Somerset
