= East Coker =

Village in Somerset, England

Coordinates: 50.9101°N 2.6485°W

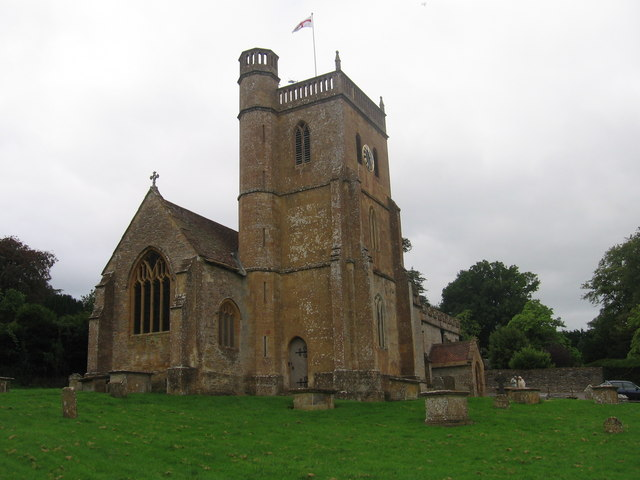
- St Michael and All Angels' Church, East Coker

- Location within Somerset
- Population: 1,667 (2011)
- OS grid reference: ST545125
- Unitary authority: Somerset Council
- Ceremonial county: Somerset
- Region: South West
- Country: England
- Sovereign state: United Kingdom
- Post town: YEOVIL
- Postcode district: BA22
- Dialling code: 01935
- Police: Avon and Somerset
- Fire: Devon and Somerset
- Ambulance: South Western
- UK Parliament: Yeovil

East Coker is a village and civil parish in Somerset, England. Its nearest town is Yeovil, two miles (3.2 km) to the north. The village has a population of 1,667. The parish includes the hamlets and areas of North Coker, Burton, Holywell, Coker Marsh, Darvole, Nash, Keyford as well as the southern end of the Wraxhill area.

== History ==
A Roman villa was discovered in East Coker in the 18th century and subsequent excavation has discovered artefacts including a mosaic; however, further work is needed to fully identify the plan of the building.

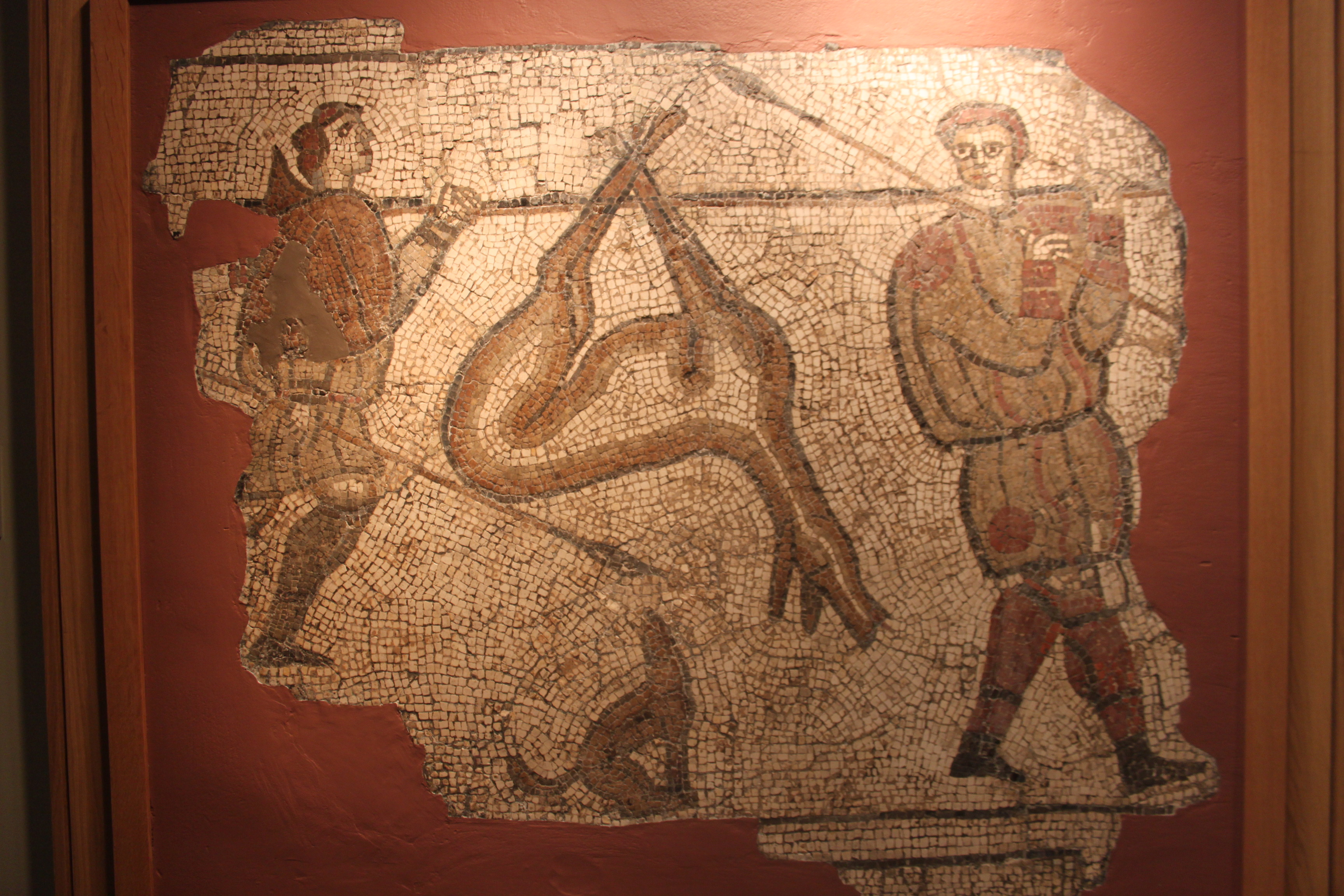
The East Coker Mosaic on display at the Museum of Somerset in Taunton Castle

In the Domesday Book of 1086 the villages of West and East Coker were known as Cocre.

The parish was part of the hundred of Houndsborough.

The Manor of East Coker was held by the Courtenay family of Powderham from 1306 until 1591. They built Coker Court as the manor house which was eventually sold to Edward Phelips, a wealthy landowner in the region. Upon Edward's death, the manor was left to his trustee, William Helyar, whose family it descended into for the next 300 years. After the last Helyar heir died in the first half of the 20th century, the lordship was acquired by a descendant of the Courtenay family who is the current lord of the manor.

In 1645, soon after the English Civil War, 70 people in the village died of the plague.

In 2011 South Somerset Council published a plan for local housing which included a proposal for the construction of 3,700 new houses on land between East Coker and Yeovil. Local opposition has been vocal. It included an application, supported by Andrew Motion, for World Heritage Site listing based on associations with T. S. Eliot, who wrote the poem East Coker, the second of his "Four Quartets" in 1940 after a visit to the village.

== Governance ==
The parish council has responsibility for local issues, including setting an annual precept (local rate) to cover the council's operating costs and producing annual accounts for public scrutiny. The parish council evaluates local planning applications and works with the local police, district council officers, and neighbourhood watch groups on matters of crime, security, and traffic. The parish council's role also includes initiating projects for the maintenance and repair of parish facilities, as well as consulting with the district council on the maintenance, repair, and improvement of highways, drainage, footpaths, public transport, and street cleaning. Conservation matters (including trees and listed buildings) and environmental issues are also the responsibility of the council.

For local government purposes, since 1 April 2023, the village comes under the unitary authority of Somerset Council. Prior to this, it was part of the non-metropolitan district of South Somerset (established under the Local Government Act 1972). It was part of Yeovil Rural District before 1974.

It is also part of the Yeovil county constituency represented in the House of Commons of the Parliament of the United Kingdom. It elects one Member of Parliament (MP) by the first past the post system of election.

== Landmarks ==
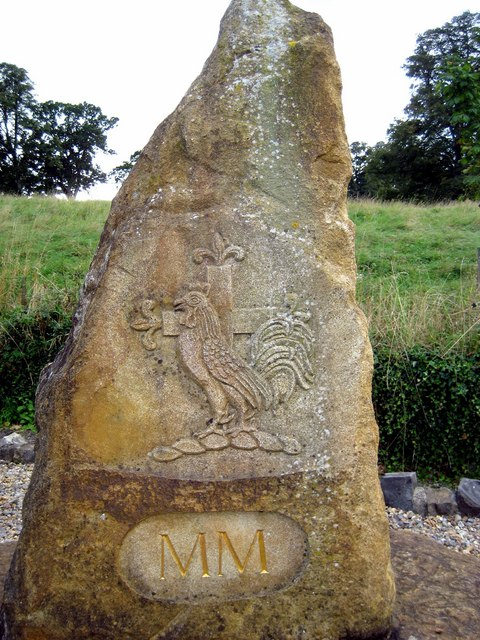
Millennium Stone, East Coker

Coker Court was built as a 15th-century manor house, and is now divided into several properties. The 18th-century portion was built by Sir William Chambers. It was used as Clare School at one time. It is listed Grade I.

Helyar Almshouses built between 1640 and 1660.

Hymerford House (also known as Grove Farmhouse) dates from the 15th century and is listed Grade I.

Naish Priory listed Grade I contains extant portions of a substantial and important establishment that was part of the manor of Coker and dates from the 14th century.

== Transport ==
The parish has no railway station, the nearest being Yeovil Junction railway station on the Exeter-London Waterloo line which passes through the parish. Previously the village was served by Sutton Bingham Station which was about one kilometre south of the village and closed to all traffic on 31 December 1962. There are a few bus routes, these are Route N8 (Nippy Bus) West Coker-Yeovil which operates hourly Monday to Friday Daytime between 8am and 5pm Route X37 (Sureline) Yeovil-Dorchester operates one journey in this direction only Monday to Friday Yeovil College Term time Only at 0927 arriving at Dorchester at 1020 in combination with a return service Route 212 (Sureline) Dorchester-Yeovil operates one journey in this direction only Monday to Friday Yeovil College Term time Only leaving Dorchester at 1200 arriving back in East Coker at 1314. The parish also has some innovative demand responsive transport provided by Nippy Bus, the N8 can be booked to pick up passengers off route in the parish after first registering and calling the company an hour before travel and will arrange a convenient time within the hours of operation to pick people up. There is also a night bus service Route N4 Crewkerne-Yeovil which operates on a demand responsive basis Wednesday-Saturday Nights, last journey from Yeovil Thursday-Saturday Nights is at 0250 in the early hours of the morning arriving in the parish around 0330.

== Industry ==
Coker Canvas. Samuel Hutchings of East Coker, sail cloth manufacturer in 1828. Sail cloth manufacturing in the 18th and 19th century. John Bullock of East Coker, sail cloth manufacturer 1740's - 1780's (father and son).

== Religious sites ==
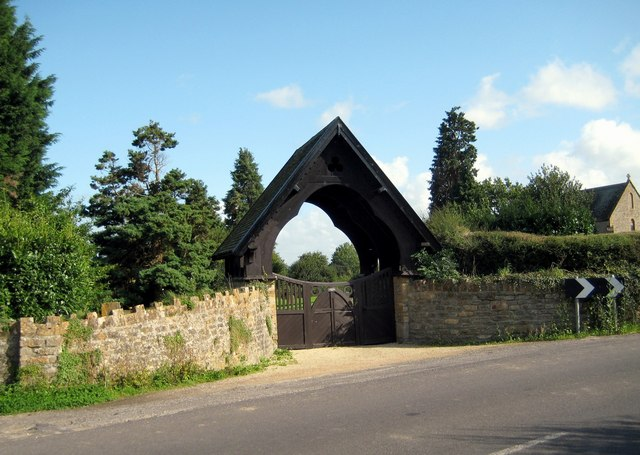
Lychgate East Coker Cemetery

The church of St Michael in East Coker dates from the 12th century and has been designated by English Heritage as a Grade II* listed building. The church is the final resting place of the ashes of T. S. Eliot, whose ancestors came from the village.

== Notable residents ==
- William Dampier (1651- 1715), buccaneer, sea captain, explorer, author and scientific observer.
- Gerald Basil Edwards (1899–1976), Guernsey-born author of The Book of Ebenezer Le Page.
- James Bree (1923–2008), actor.
- David Foot (1929–2021), a British journalist and historian
- Trevor Peacock (1931–2021), actor (who played Jim Trott in the BBC sitcom The Vicar of Dibley) lived in the village.
- Marcus Fysh (born 1970), politician and MP for Yeovil from 2015 to 2024, lived in Naish Priory

== Notable trees ==
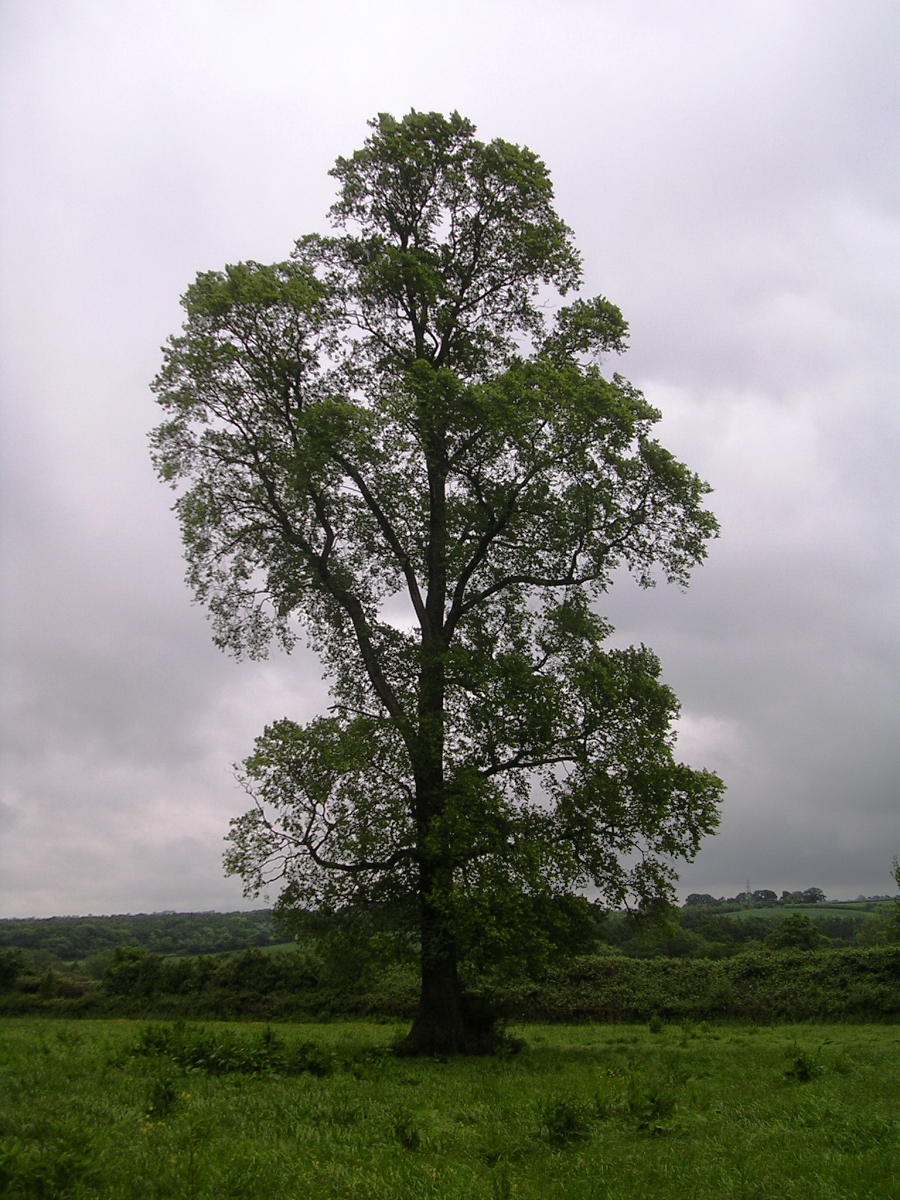
Ulmus minor tree

A superb specimen of the narrow-leaved (or smooth-leaved) elm Ulmus minor subsp. minor survives, unscathed by Dutch elm disease, in a pasture to the south-east of the village. Measured in 2008, it was more than 30 m in height, with a d.b.h. of 85 cm. Almost certainly planted as one of many ornamentals by the Helyar dynasty, the tree is a TROBI UK Champion, and has been adjudged the finest freestanding specimen in Europe.

The tree has been cloned at Le Pépinière Forestière de L'etat, Guémené-Penfao, France, as part of the Euforgen genetic resources conservation programme.
