= Queen's Golden Jubilee =

Queen's Golden Jubilee may refer to:

- Golden Jubilee of Queen Victoria in 1887
- Golden Jubilee of Elizabeth II in 2002
- Golden Jubilee of Margrethe II in 2022
