= John Davy Hayward =

British critic and editor

John Davy Hayward CBE (2 February 1905 – 17 September 1965) was an English editor, critic, anthologist and bibliophile.

== Early life ==
Hayward was educated at Gresham's School and in France before going up to King's College, Cambridge in 1923 to read English and modern languages. While still a Cambridge undergraduate, he edited and published the Collected Works of the Earl of Rochester.

== Career ==
From 1927, Hayward lived in London, working as an editor, critic, anthologist and bibliographer. He edited many of Jonathan Swift's works.

In 1929, he edited John Donne, Dean of St Paul's: Complete Poetry and Selected Prose for the Nonesuch Press.

For eleven years, from 1946 to 1957, he shared a house with his close friend the poet T. S. Eliot, gathering and archiving Eliot's papers and styling himself Keeper of the Eliot Archive. Eliot's book of verse called Poems Written in Early Youth was compiled and edited by Hayward. With Eliot's help he emended the poems from The Harvard Advocate and added the poems from Eliot's days at St. Louis' Smith Academy, plus the previously unpublished "The Death of Saint Narcissus". This friendship was strained by Eliot's unexpected marriage in January 1957 to his secretary Esmé Valerie Fletcher. To a large extent, she took over Hayward's functions in Eliot's life after they separated their households.

He was editor of The Book Collector from 1952 to 1965.

Since the mid-1920s Hayward had suffered from muscular dystrophy, and he died in 1965, a few months after Eliot. He bequeathed his entire collection of the literary manuscripts of T.S. Eliot to King's College, Cambridge.

== Bibliography ==
- Collected Works of the Earl of Rochester, ed. John Davy Hayward (1925)
- John Donne, Dean of St Paul's: Complete Poetry and Selected Prose, ed. John Hayward (Nonesuch Press, 1929)
- The Letters of Saint Evremond, Charles Marguetel de Saint Denis, Seigneur de Saint Evremond, ed. John Hayward (George Routledge & Sons, London, 1930)
- "Charles II", Great Lives Series (Duckworth, London, 1933)
- Gulliver's Travels & Selected Writings in Prose & Verse by Dean Swift, ed. John Hayward (Nonesuch Press, Bloomsbury, 1944)
- Seventeenth Century Poetry - An Anthology Chosen by John Hayward (Chatto & Windus, 1948)
- Since 1939 - Drama, the Novel, Poetry, Prose Literature by Robert Speaight, John Hayward, Henry Reed and Stephen Spender (1949)
- Selected Prose by T. S. Eliot, ed. John Hayward (Penguin Books, London, 1953)
- The Penguin Book of English Verse, ed. John Hayward (Penguin Books, London, 1956)
- Poems Written in Early Youth by T. S. Eliot, ed. John Hayward (private printing of 12 copies, 1950, published by Faber and Faber, 1967)
- Poetry Book Society Christmas 1966 supplement, ed. Eric W. W. White, with an introduction in memory of John Hayward

== Sources ==
- Janus: the Papers of John Davy Hayward
- The Harvard Advocate Poems of T.S. Eliot
- Webster's Dictionary: T.S. Eliot
