= The Chinnocks =

Group of villages in Somerset, England

Coordinates: 50°54′59″N 02°44′03″W

The Chinnocks are a group of three villages in Somerset, England, located south-west of Yeovil in the Somerset Council unitary authority area. The villages are:

- East Chinnock
- Middle Chinnock
- West Chinnock

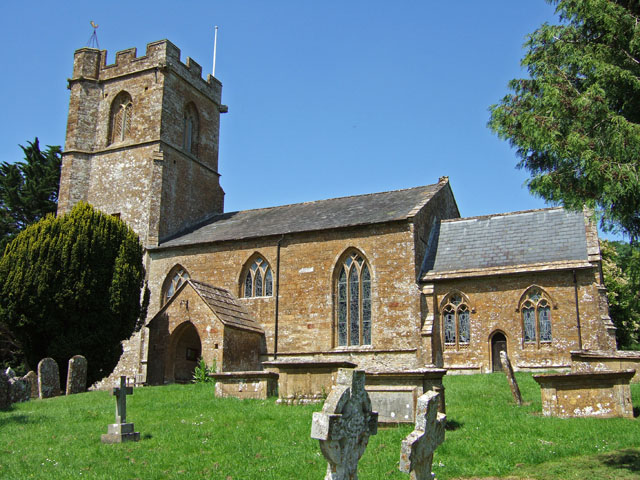
Church in East Chinnock

The origin of the name Chinnock is uncertain. It may be derived from the Old English cinu meaning ravine or cinn meaning a chin-shaped hill, with the addition of ock meaning little. An alternative derivation may be an old hill-name of Celtic origin.

== Geography ==
The three villages have been separate since at least 1066. East Chinnock and West Chinnock are approximately 3 km apart. Middle Chinnock lies close to West Chinnock and since 1884 has been part of the civil parish of West Chinnock, now known as West and Middle Chinnock.

== History ==
The three parishes were part of the hundred of Houndsborough.

== See also ==
- South Somerset
- Yeovil
