= Water parsley =

Water parsley is a common name for several species of plants and may refer to:

- Apium nodiflorum (Apiaceae), native to Africa, western Asia, and Europe
- Oenanthe (plant), primarily:
  - Oenanthe javanica (Apiaceae), native to eastern Asia
  - Oenanthe sarmentosa (Apiaceae), native to western North America
