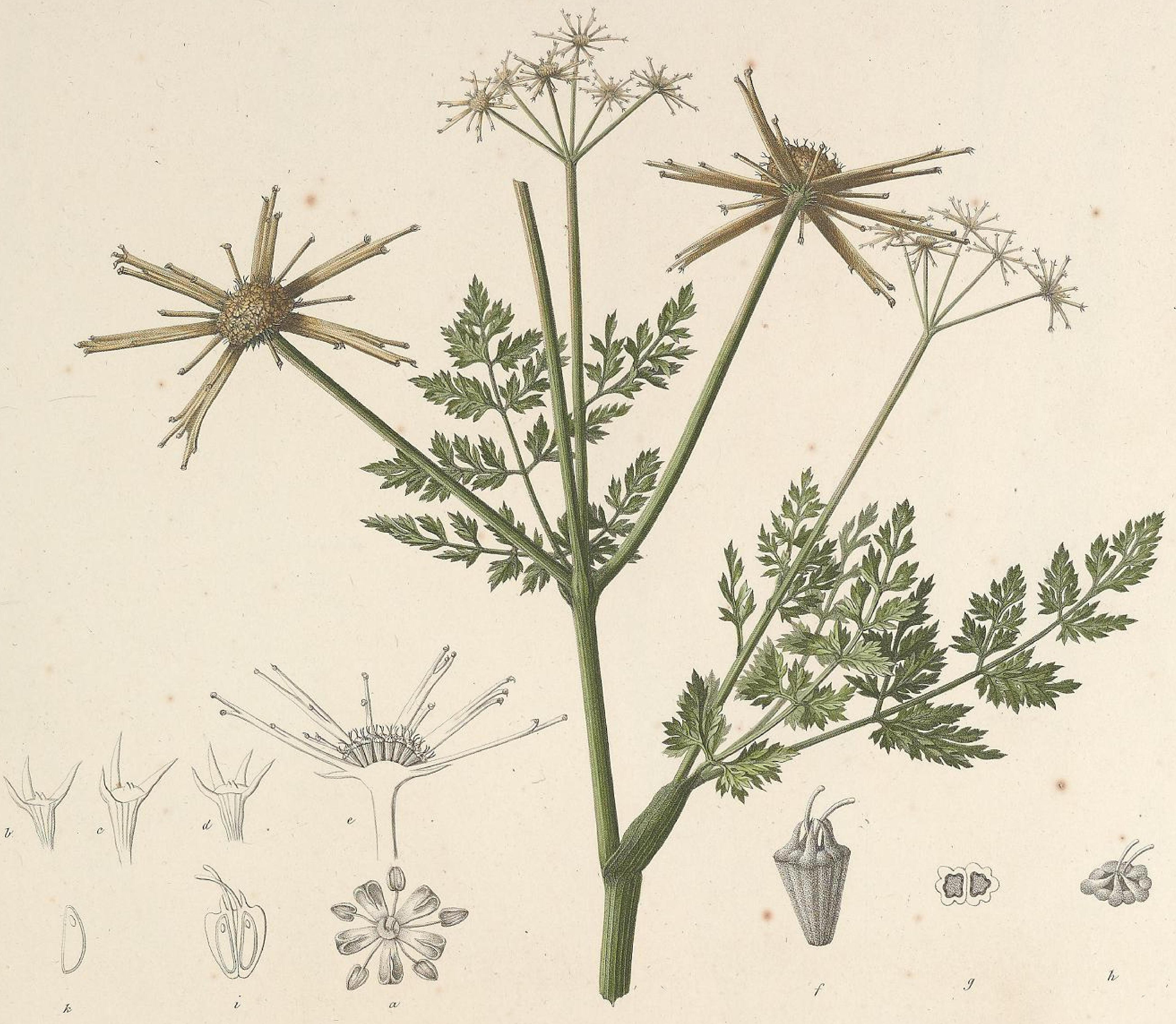

Scientific classification
- Kingdom: Plantae
- Clade: Tracheophytes
- Clade: Angiosperms
- Clade: Eudicots
- Clade: Asterids
- Order: Apiales
- Family: Apiaceae
- Genus: Actinanthus; Ehrenb.
- Species: A. syriacus

Binomial name
- Actinanthus syriacus Ehrenb.

= Actinanthus =

Genus of flowering plants

Actinanthus is a monospecific genus which contains only the species Actinanthus syriacus. It is native to Syria and Lebanon. GRIN lists it as a synonym of Oenanthe but Plants of the World Online lists it as a separate genus.
