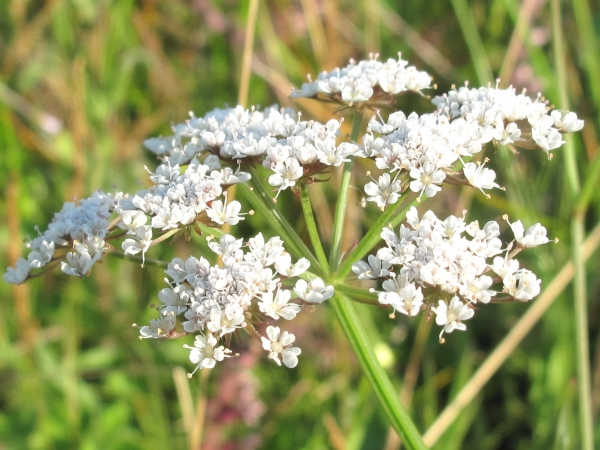

Conservation status
- Least Concern (IUCN 3.1)

Scientific classification
- Kingdom: Plantae
- Clade: Embryophytes
- Clade: Tracheophytes
- Clade: Spermatophytes
- Clade: Angiosperms
- Clade: Eudicots
- Clade: Asterids
- Order: Apiales
- Family: Apiaceae
- Genus: Oenanthe
- Species: O. silaifolia

Binomial name
- Oenanthe silaifolia M. Bieb.

= Oenanthe silaifolia =

Species of flowering plant

Oenanthe silaifolia, narrow-leaved water-dropwort, is a flowering plant in the carrot family, which is native to Europe and adjacent parts of Asia and North Africa. It is an uncommon plant of water-meadows and wetlands.

== Description ==
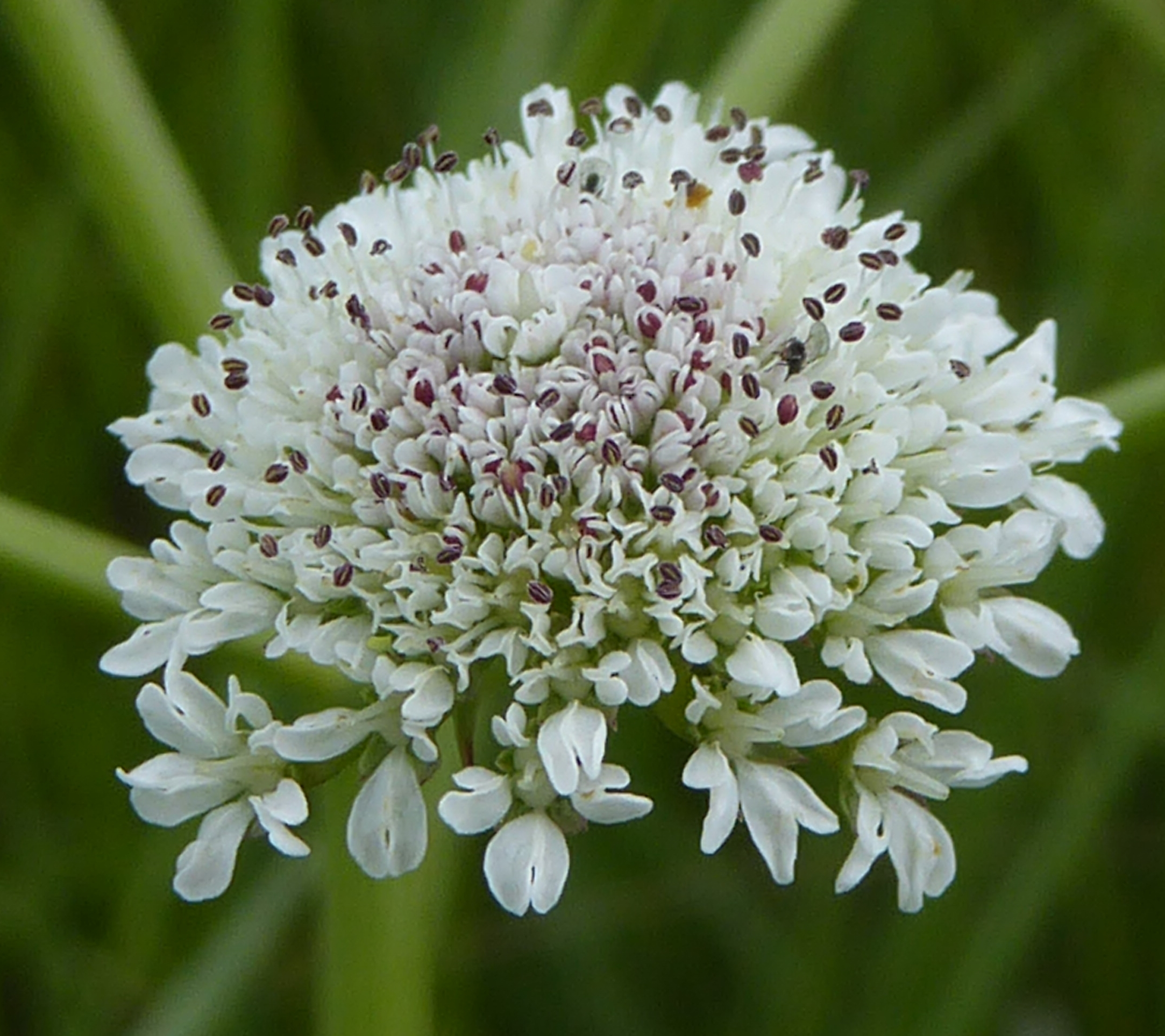
Close-up of a single flowerhead, or umbellule

Narrow-leaved water-dropwort is a hairless, tuberous perennial growing up to 100 cm tall with a stem that is solid below and hollow in the upper parts, grooved and striated, 0.7 cm in diameter. The upper leaves are once to twice pinnate with linear or lanceolate (sword-shaped) leaflets up to 3 cm long; the lower ones are 2-4 pinnate, with similarly narrow leaflets. The leaf stalks of the lower leaves are long, but the upper leaves have stalks that are shorter than the leaf blade. They do not form a sheath around the stem at their base.

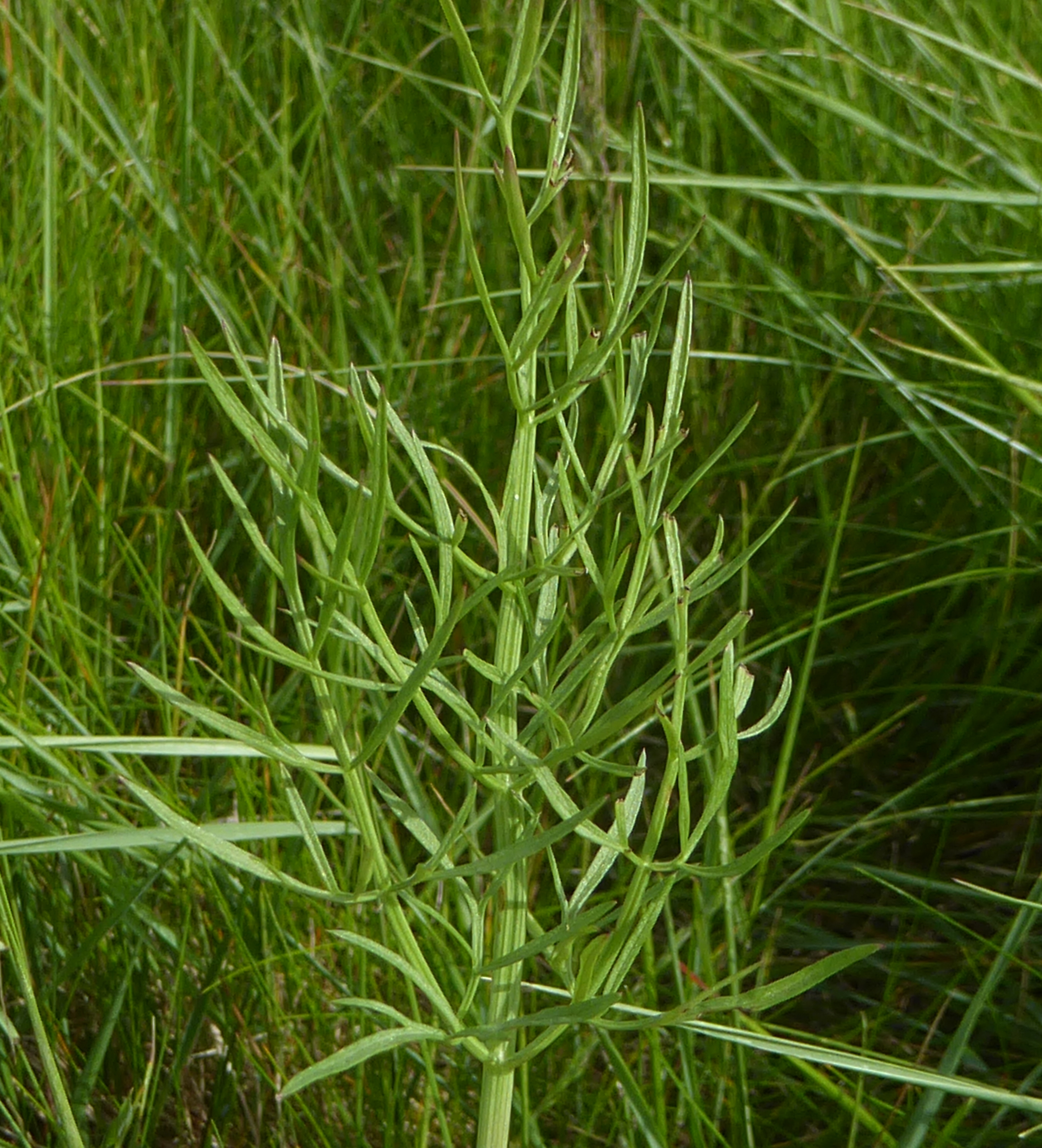
A leaf blade

It flowers in June in northern Europe, with primary umbels of 4-8 smaller rounded umbellules about 2 cm in diameter, each of which has numerous white flowers. There are no bracts on the main umbel and many (10-17) small, lanceolate bracteoles at the base of each of the individual secondary umblets. Plants are monoecious, with hermaphroditic and male flowers on the terminal umbels and only male flowers on the lateral ones. Each flower has 5 unequal petals with the outer ones slightly larger, 5 stamens and 2 prominent styles arising from a swollen base (stylopodium) at the top of the ovary. After flowering, the flower stalks thicken, and the umbels do not become flat-topped in fruit. The fruit are 3-3.5 mm long, cylindrical, with prominent ridges.

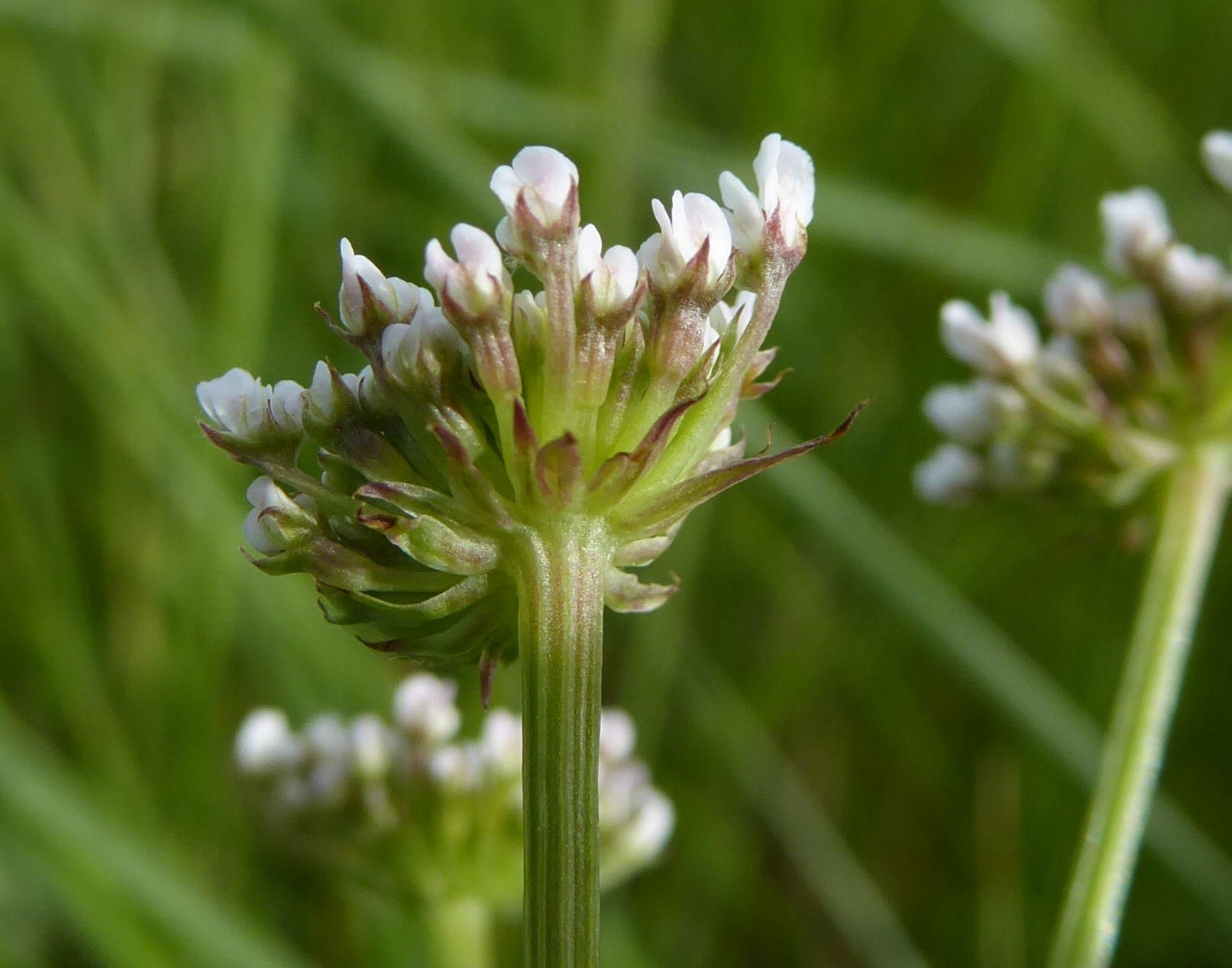
Close-up of the bracteoles below a single umbellule

== Taxonomy ==
The first description of narrow-leaved water-dropwort was by the German botanist Friedrich August Marschall von Bieberstein in his Flora Taurico-Caucasica in 1819. It has dozens of synonyms (i.e. other authors have subsequently named the same plant, but Bieberstein's name has precedence), including O. biebersteinii Simon (1903), O. peucedanifolia Heuff. ex Boiss. (1873) and Phellandrium lobelii Bubani (1899). A full list can be found in the Synonymic Checklists of the Plants of the World. A few forms and varieties have also been named, but none is currently accepted. It is not known to hybridise with any other species.

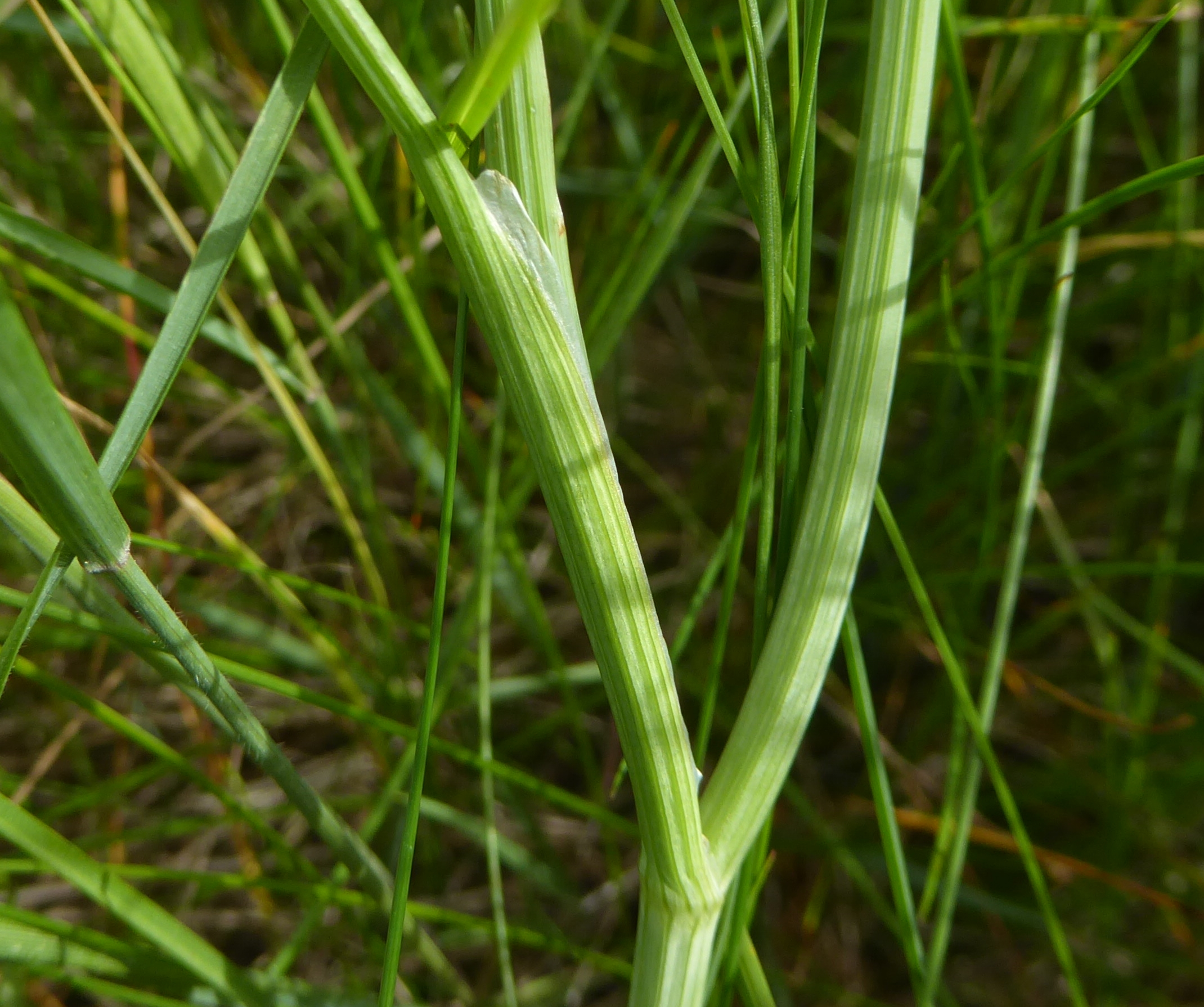
The petioles are not expanded, as they are in some other water-dropworts

Its chromosome number is 2n = 22 (based on British specimens).

The generic name Oenanthe, which comes from the Ancient Greek οίνος, "wine" and άνθος, "flower", was used in ancient times for certain Mediterranean plants and later adopted to describe this genus. The specific epithet "silaifolia" means "with leaves like silaum" and refers to its uniformly narrow leaflets. A "dropwort" is a plant with drop-shaped tubers.

== Identification ==
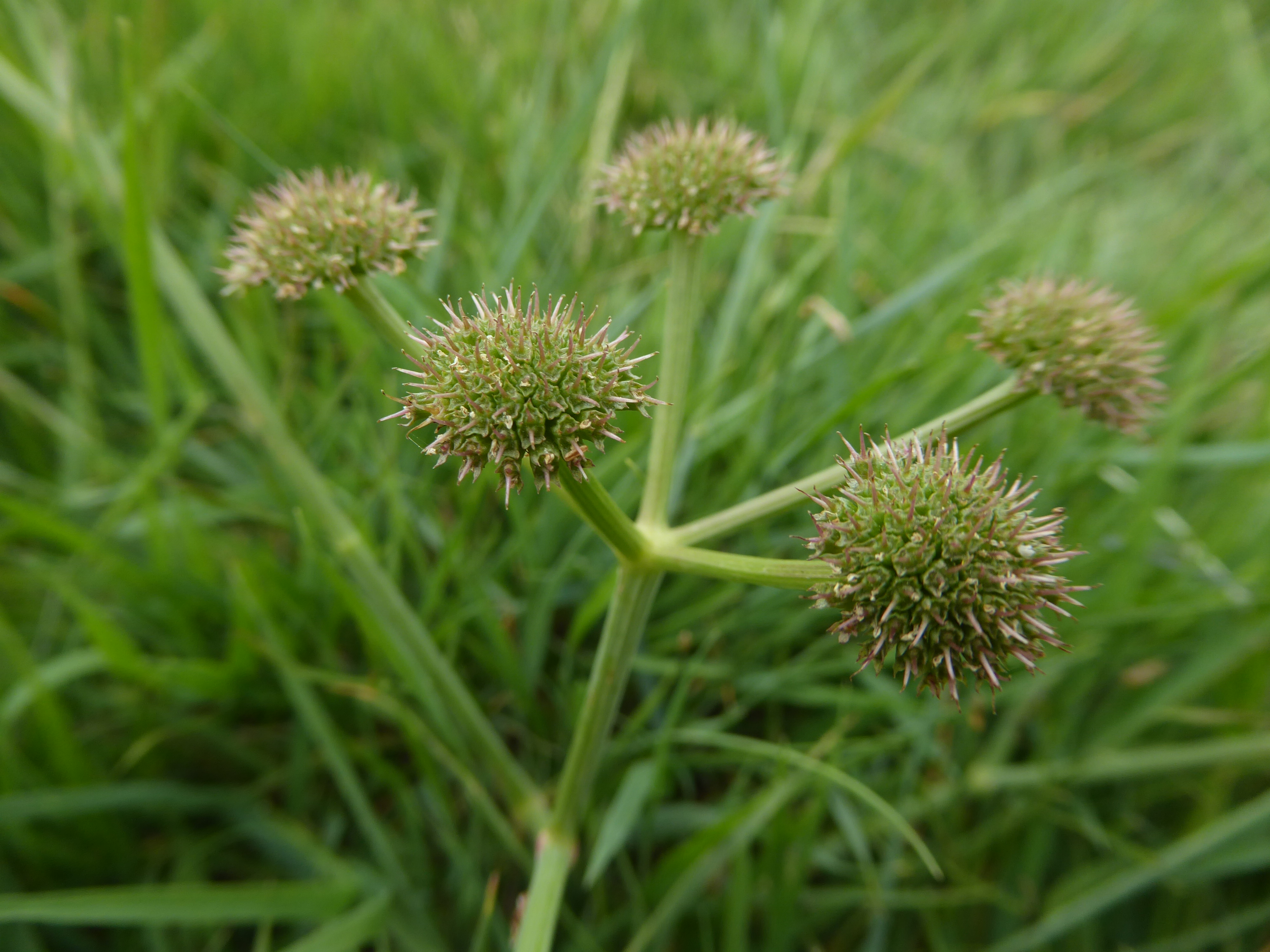
The fruiting umblets are not flat-topped

Great care must be taken to distinguish this species from several very similar ones. In Britain, it can most easily be confused with corky-fruited water-dropwort and parsley water-dropwort. Both of these are likely to have slightly broader segments on the lower leaves and will usually have bracts on the main umbels. Unlike the other two, parsley water-dropwort has rays and pedicels that do not thicken in fruit, while corky-fruited water-dropwort is the only one to have umbels that become flat-topped in fruit. Fine-leaved water-dropwort also has stems which remain hollow as they age, with thin walls (<0.5 mm thick) while the other species often develop solid stems or thicker stem walls.

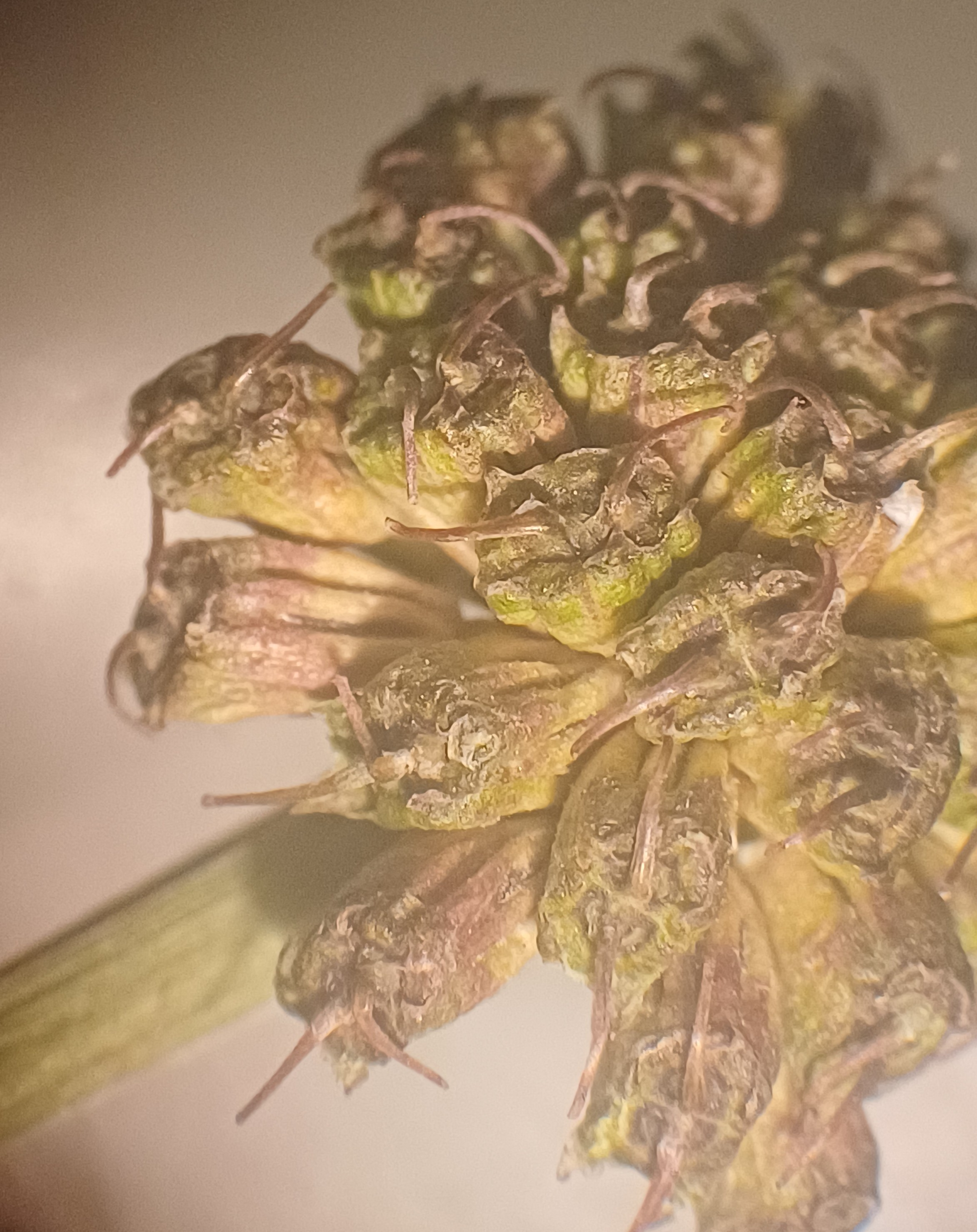
The mature umbel is dome-shaped, the fruits are deeply ridged, and the styles are separate at the base.

== Distribution and status ==
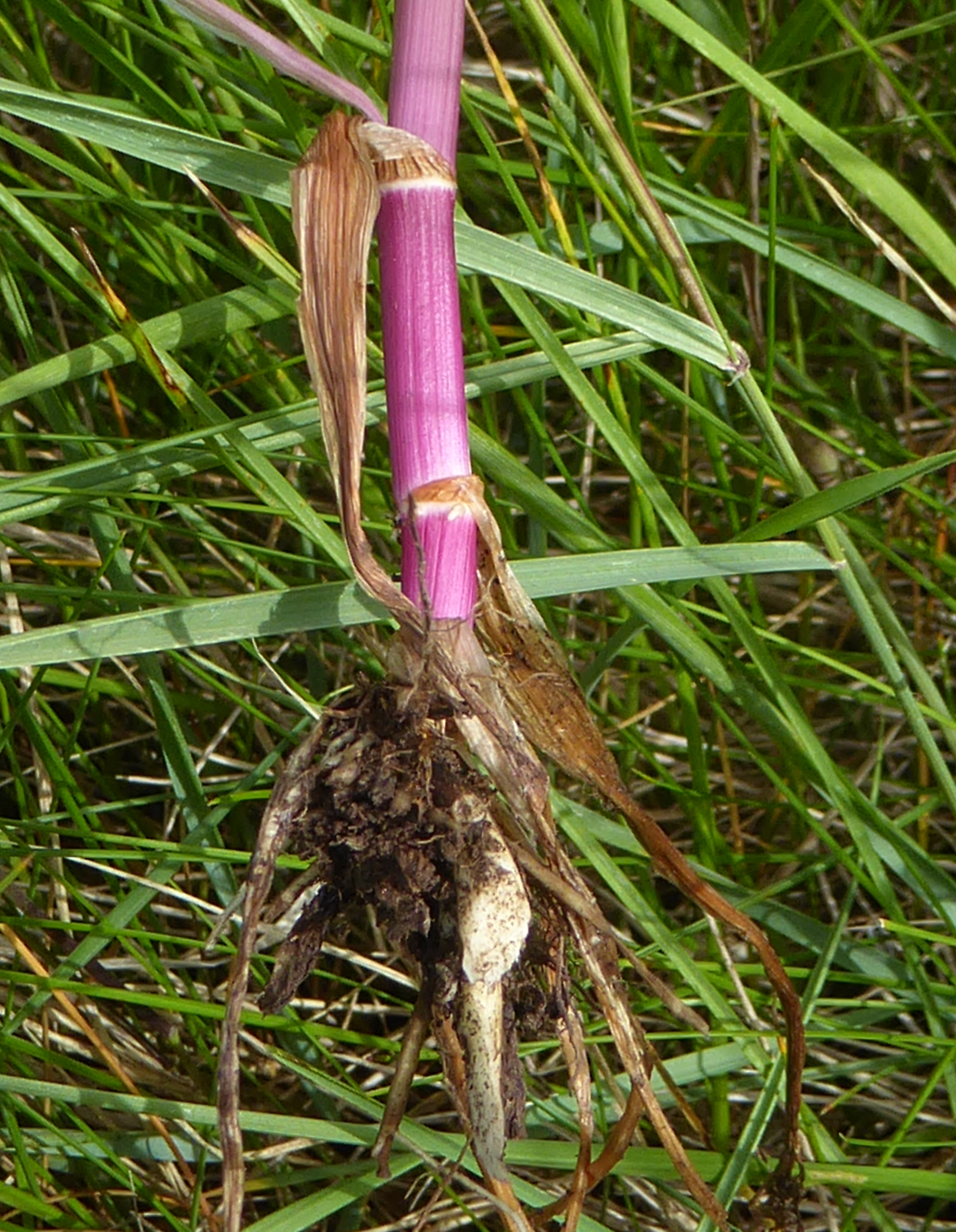
Lower stem and roots of narrow-leaved water-dropwort

The global range of narrow-leaved water-dropwort is centred on Europe, the main populations being in France, England, Spain, Italy and Greece. It extends as far north as The Netherlands, east to the Caspian Sea, and southwards as far as the Middle East and North Africa. It is not recorded as an introduction beyond its natural range.

In Britain, it is found from southern England as far north as Yorkshire, and as far west as SE Wales.

In Britain and France, it is classified as Least Concern, meaning that it is not rare nor declining at a particularly high rate. In certain counties and regions, however, it is judged to have a higher threat status. Overall, it appears to be increasing slightly in Britain, although there is uncertainty about the veracity of some records.

It is considered an axiophyte in all the British counties in which it occurs.

== Habitat and ecology ==
It is a plant of wet meadows, typically those which are flooded with calcareous river water during winter, but it is not tolerant of agricultural intensification and is common only in unimproved grasslands. It is also found on river banks and ditch sides.

Its Ellenberg values in Britain are L = 8, F = 9, R = 7, N = 5, and S = 0, whereas in the Czech Republic the assigned values are L = 8, T = 6, F = 8, R = 7, N = 6, and S = 2.

In a study of grasslands in the Marais Poitevin region of France, Oenanthe silaifolia was found not to contribute to the soil seed bank, which the authors of the study considered was because it primarily reproduces vegetatively. Any seeds that are produced may be short-lived. In Britain, populations in unimproved fields can number tens of thousands of plants, but the meadows are typically mown before flowering, so seed production is rare.

The vegetation community in which it grows is described in Croatia as Alopecurus pratensis-Oenanthe silaifolia grassland, in periodically flooded meadows with a slightly acidic reaction and high nutrient status, along with rare species such as Allium angulosum, Alopecurus rendlei and Fritillaria meleagris. The British equivalent is MG4 Alopecurus pratensis-Sanguisorba officinalis flood meadow grassland, which is also known for having populations of F. meleagris.

The parsnip moth is the only insect known to feed on narrow-leaved water-dropwort in Britain. The caterpillars eat this and various other types of umbellifer.

== Uses ==
Most water-dropworts (Oenanthe spp.) are toxic to some degree but, as a widespread component of pastures and hay meadows, narrow-leaved water-dropwort is clearly not harmful to livestock, although the tubers may be. It is not widely consumed by humans, but there are reports of the leaves being eaten as a vegetable or salad in Biga, Çanakkale, where it is known as Kazayağı.
