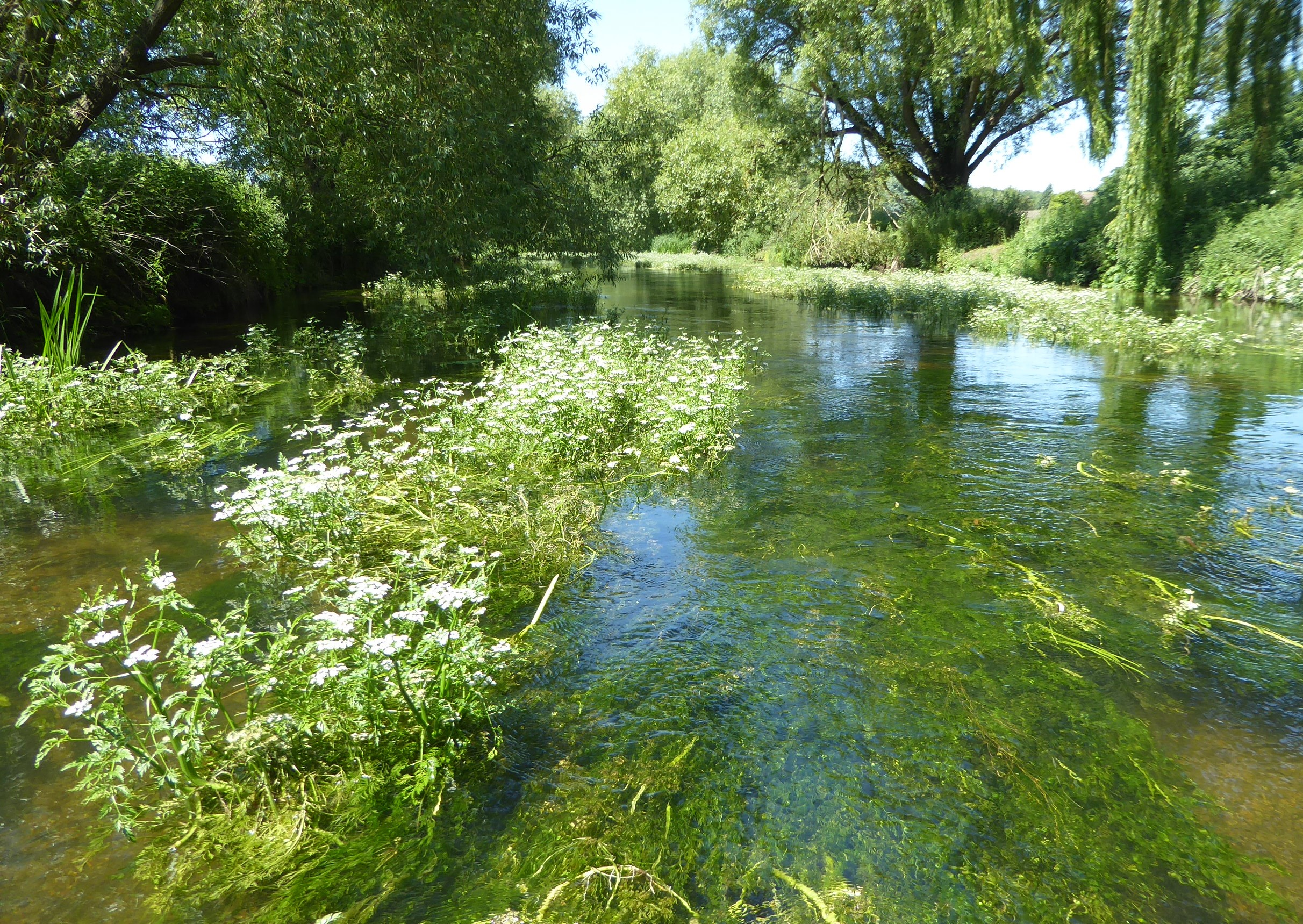

Conservation status
- Near Threatened (IUCN 3.1)

Scientific classification
- Kingdom: Plantae
- Clade: Tracheophytes
- Clade: Angiosperms
- Clade: Eudicots
- Clade: Asterids
- Order: Apiales
- Family: Apiaceae
- Genus: Oenanthe
- Species: O. fluviatilis

Binomial name
- Oenanthe fluviatilis (Bab.) Coleman

= Oenanthe fluviatilis =

Species of flowering plant

Oenanthe fluviatilis, the river water-dropwort, is a flowering plant in the carrot family, Apiaceae, which is endemic to north-west Europe. It grows only in clear, unpolluted rivers and is declining throughout its range.

== Description ==
River water-dropwort is a hairless perennial with hollow, ridged stems up to 1 m long, submerged or floating in rivers, or emergent in marginal swamps and during periods of low flow in summer. The stems creep along the surface of mud, or on the bottom of a river, rooting at the nodes. These extend upwards through the water column, becoming thicker as they ascend, to a diameter of about an inch (2.5 cm), with a central hollow about half that size. Young plants have tubers, which disappear as they mature, leaving just fibrous roots.

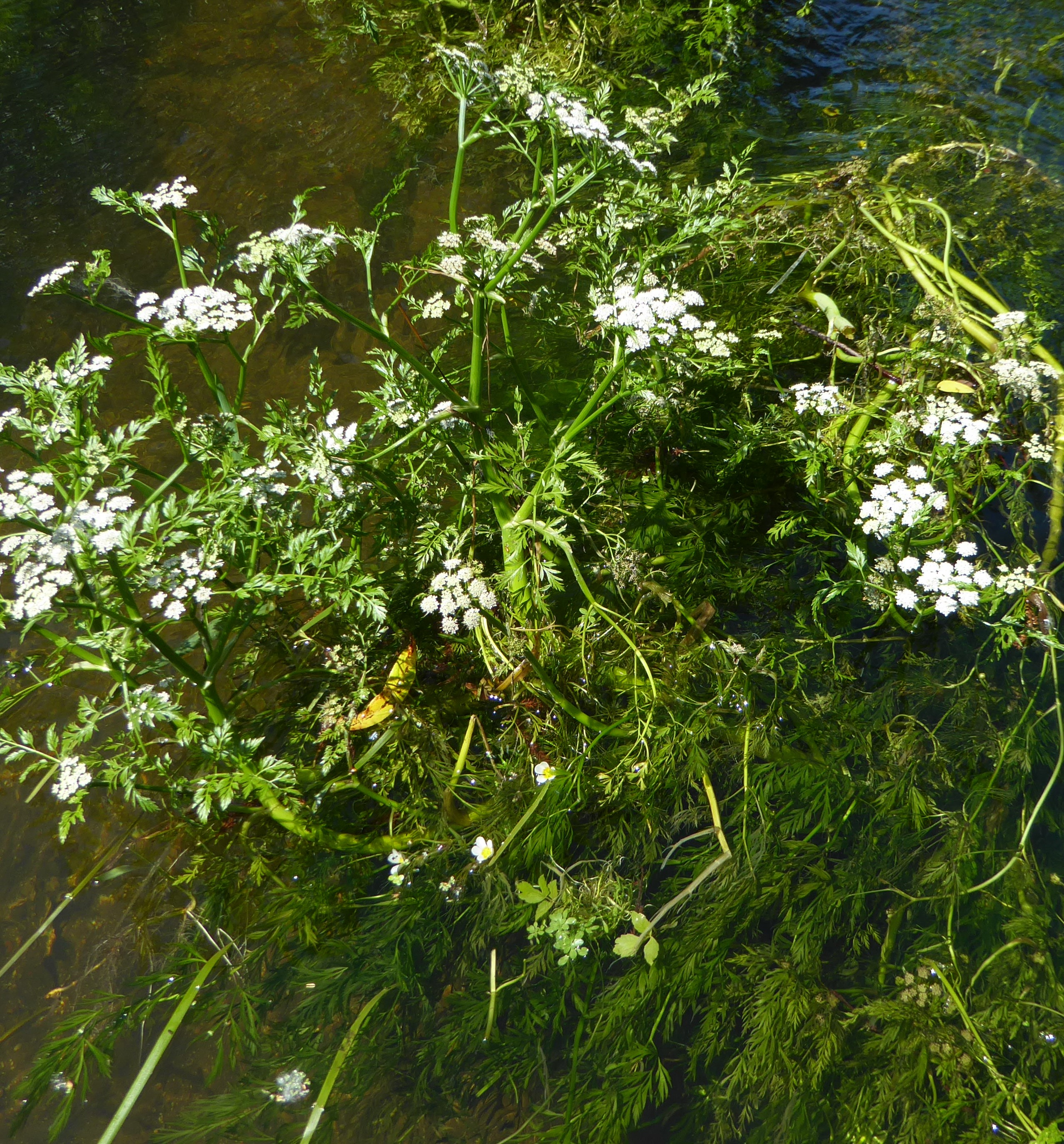
A flowering plant in a river

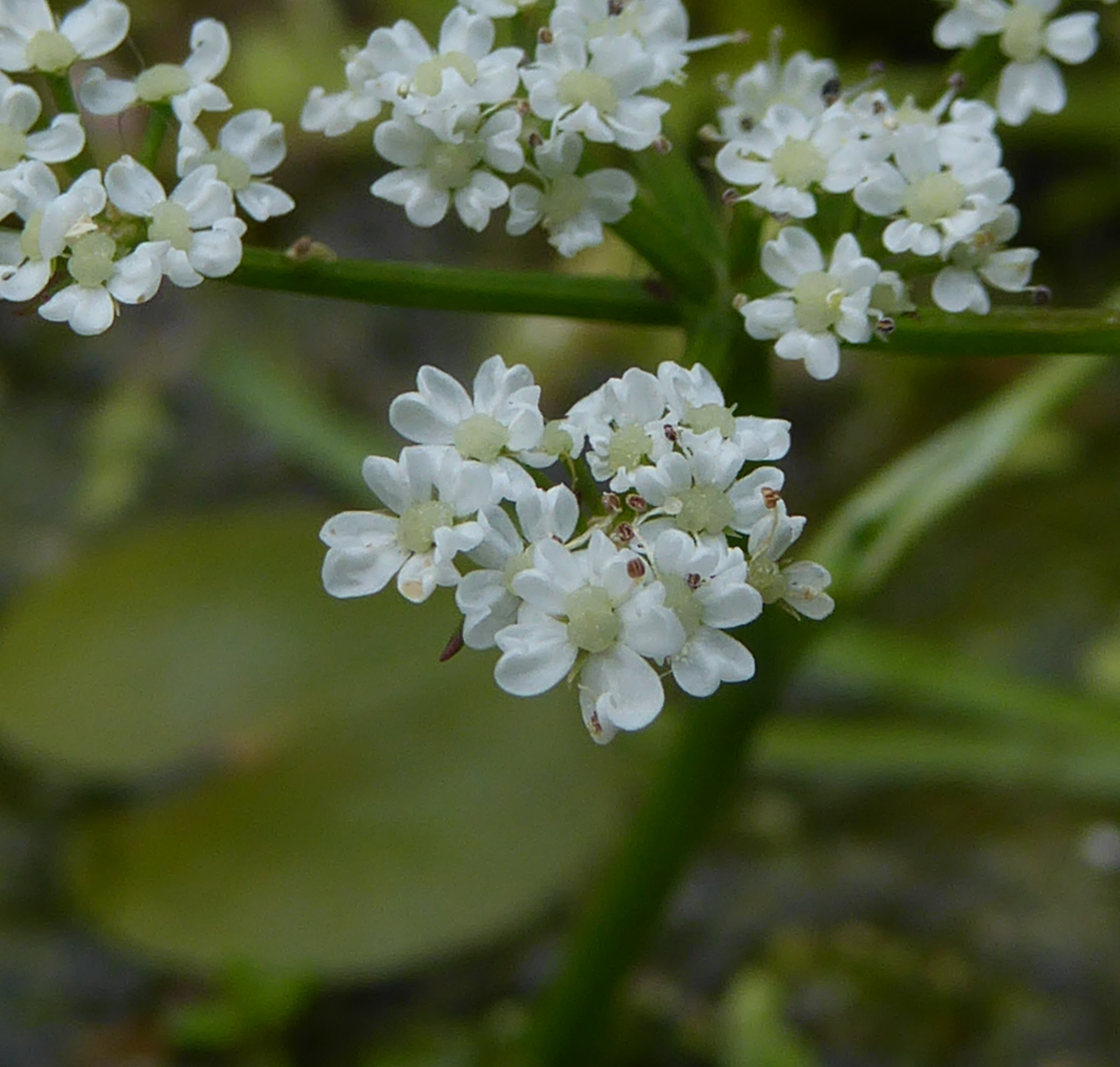
The flowers have only slightly radiating outermost petals

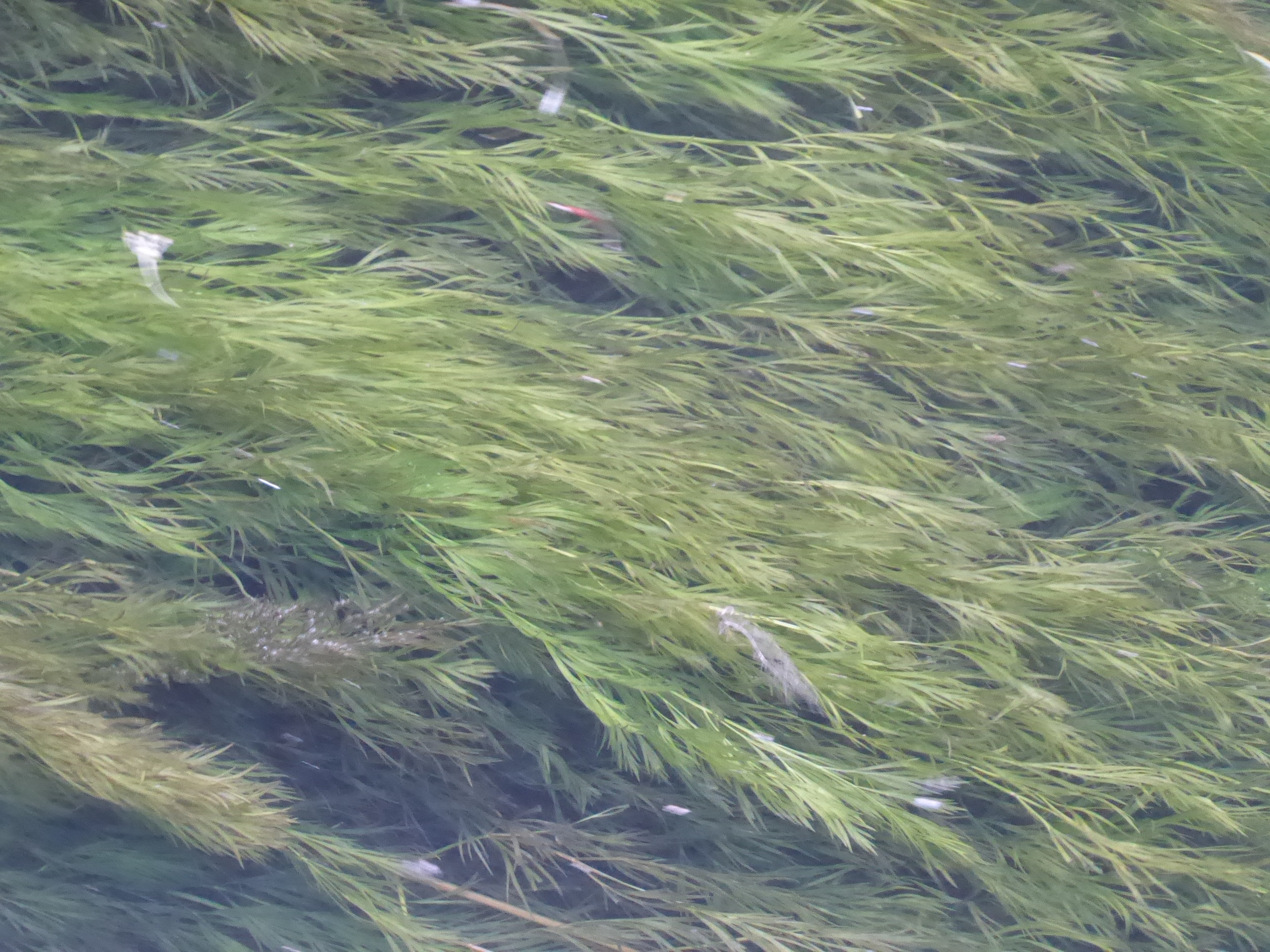
Underwater foliage in a fast-flowing stream

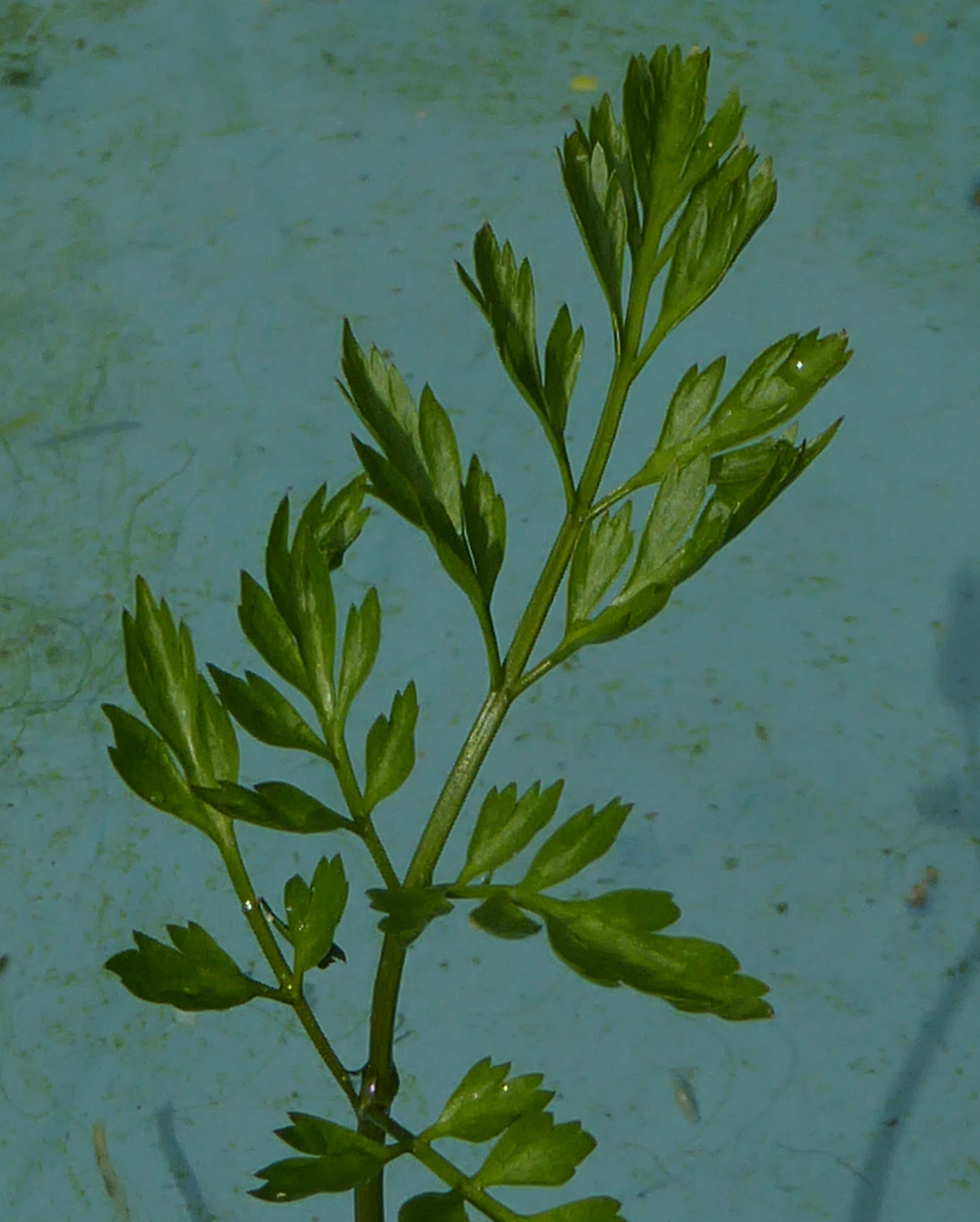
An emergent leaf from a plant of river water-dropwort, showing the characteristic shape of the leaflets

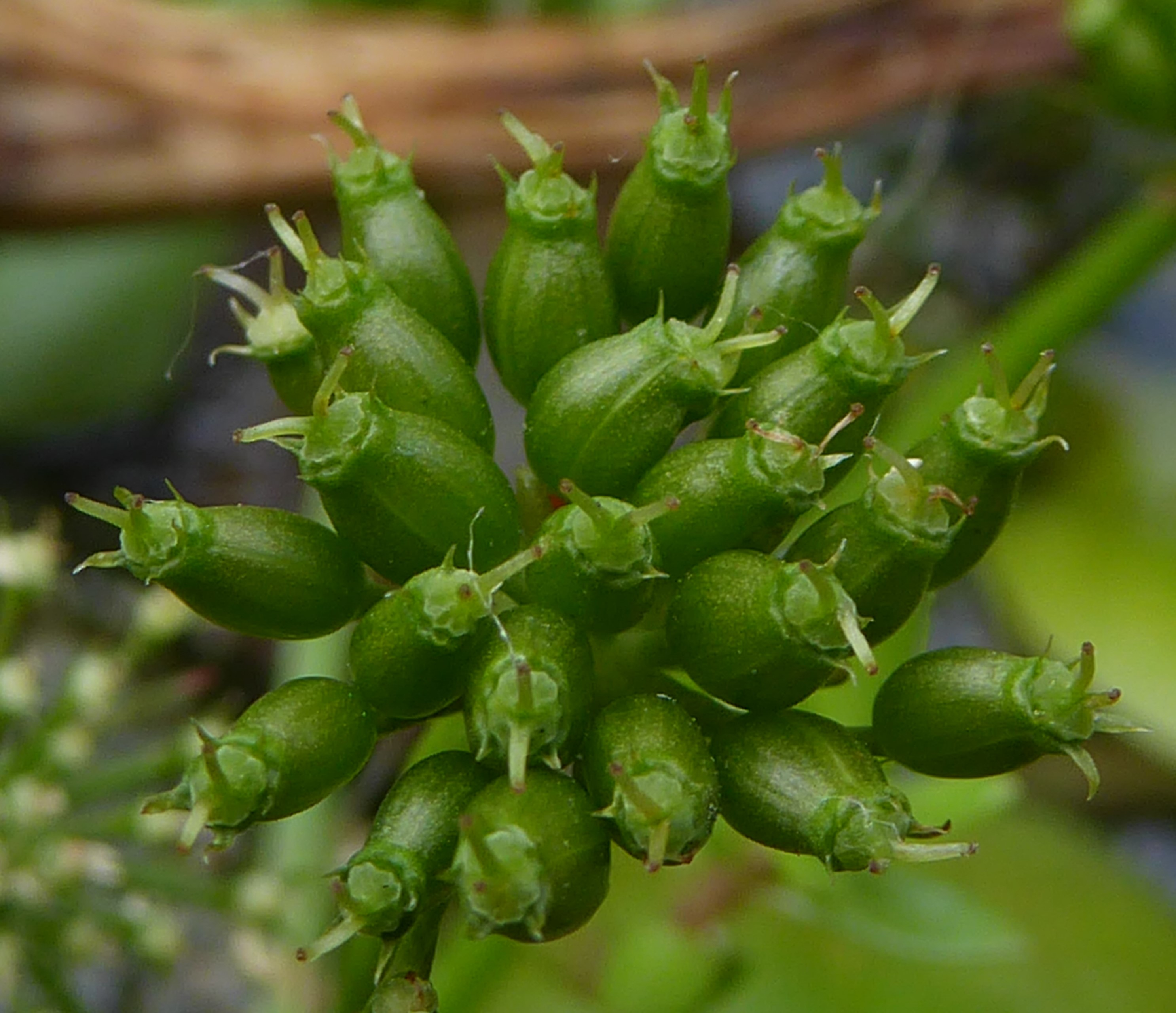
An umbellule of ripening fruits

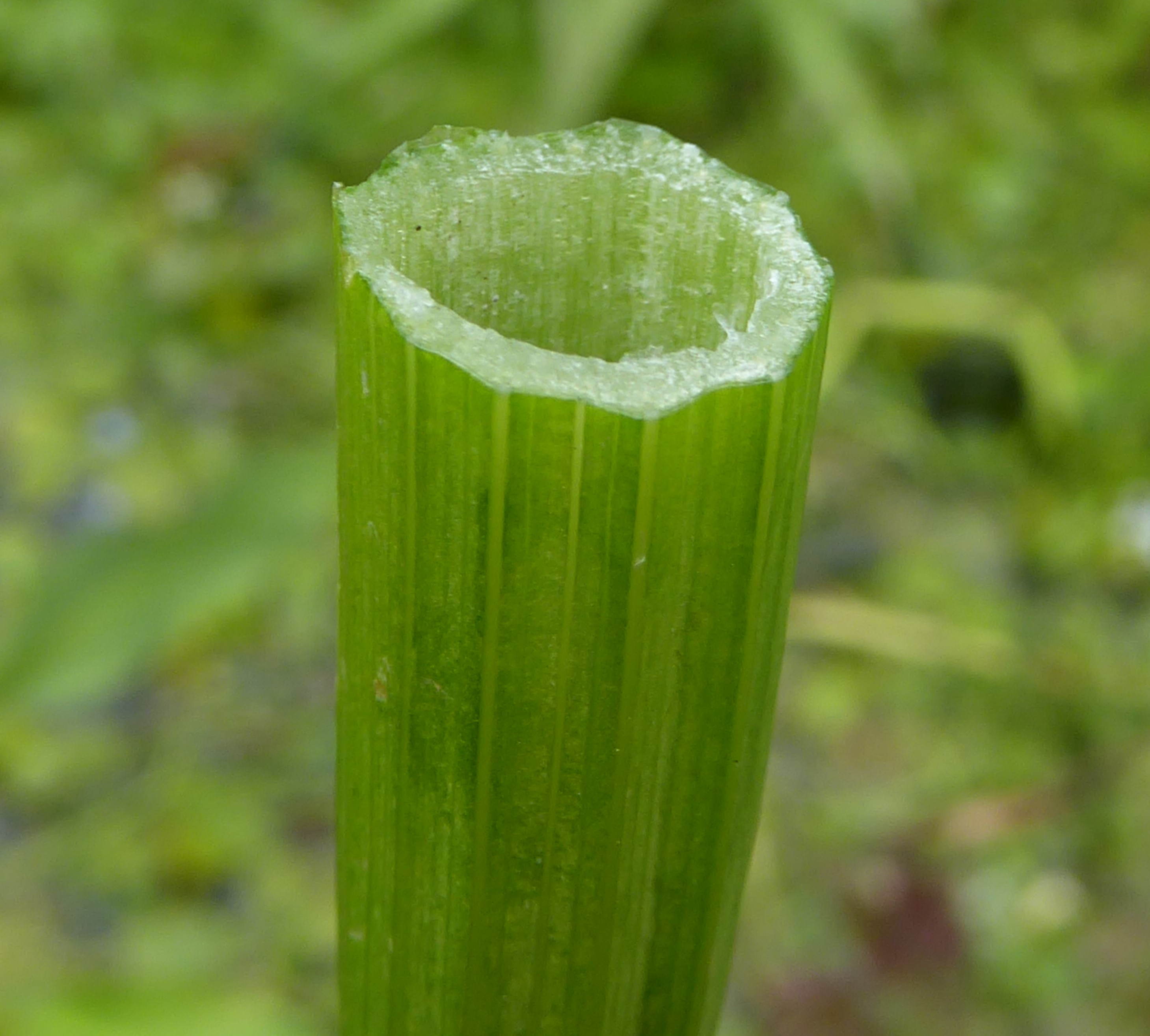
Cut section of the upper stem.

The lower, underwater leaves are once to twice pinnate, with distinctive cuneate (diamond shaped) segments which are deeply divided into almost linear lobes (especially so in faster-flowing water), with petioles as long as the leaf. These submerged leaves remain green throughout the winter but the plants are much reduced, hugging the bottom of the channel. In the summer, the upper, aerial, leaves sometimes form: they are 1-3 times pinnate with ovate, lobed segments about 1 cm long, and have petioles about one third the length of the blade. The petioles on both forms are solid and produce a sheath around the stem at their base.

The inflorescence is a compound umbel of 5-10 small, hemispherical umbellules, arising from the leaf nodes or from the tip of the stem. The rays do not thicken after flowering, as they do in some other species of dropwort. There are no bracts (or sometimes just one) on the main umbel, but the smaller umbellules each have 5-8 small, lanceolate bracteoles. The flowers are male or bisexual with 5 pointed sepals, 5 almost equal white petals, 5 stamens and (if present) 2 styles. The fruits are about 6 mm long with short, persistent styles less than a quarter as long as the fruit. Plants can also spread vegetatively from broken-off sections of stem, which take root readily.

== Identification ==
The underwater foliage is highly distinctive, with its diamond-shaped leaves and the ability of the plant to form a carpet on the bed of the stream, which remains green throughout the winter. Flowering plants could be confused with fine-leaved water-dropwort, although that species has more highly divided leaves (4-pinnate) and larger fruits (more than 5 mm long).

== Taxonomy ==
Barring a few false starts and minor confusions, river water-dropwort was overlooked as a species until the 1840s, largely because it rarely flowers. William Higgins Coleman (c. 1816–1863) first drew attention to it when he was working on his Flora of Hertfordshire. Other botanists, such as William Borrer, agreed that they had also seen it, but had assumed it was the underwater form of another species, such as cowbane.

Coleman initially reported his observations to Charles Babington who, in 1843, cautiously added it to his Manual of British Botany as Oenanthe phellandrium var. fluviatilis Bab., adding that it might in fact be a full species. The following year it was elevated to species status by Coleman (with Babington's encouragement). He described it as differing from fine-leaved water-dropwort by its 'delight' in running water, the presence of stolons (stems that root at the nodes), differences in leaf shape, and its larger fruits.

Because it was originally described as a variety, the type specimen refers to that (the basionym), rather than Coleman's species. A lectotype has recently been nominated by M.J.Y. Foley, of a specimen collected by Coleman from the River Lea near Hertford in 1841.

There are no subspecies of river water-dropwort, but one form has been described: O. fluviatilis f. submersus, in Denmark, but it has not been widely adopted. No hybrids are recorded.

Its chromosome number is 2n = 22 (based on British specimens).

The generic name Oenanthe, which comes from the Ancient Greek οίνος, "wine" and άνθος, "flower", was used in ancient times for certain Mediterranean plants and later adopted to describe this genus. The epithet "fluviatilis" is derived from the Latin word for river, fluvius. "Dropwort" is a reference to the tubers produced amongst the roots of certain other species in the genus, although they are not prominent in this plant.

== Distribution and status ==
River water-dropwort is entirely confined to North-west Europe, being recorded only in Ireland, England, Germany, Austria, France, Denmark and the Low Countries. In a global context it is considered to be Near Threatened (NT), with a population trend that is decreasing. It is possibly extinct in Germany.

In Britain, it was first recorded by Coleman in about 1841 on the River Lea in Hertfordshire, where it still grows. Earlier findings have been traced, such as a partial specimen collected by Robert Plot in the 1670s from Oxfordshire. It is currently known in at least 28 English counties and it appears to have been lost from a further 14. It does not occur in Wales or Scotland, but in Ireland it is found in some 26 counties (and lost from maybe half a dozen), mostly in the centre of the island.

The conservation importance of river water-dropwort is very high: it is entirely confined to clear, unpolluted river systems; it has a very restricted global distribution; and it is rare and decreasing across its range. In these regards, it is similar to highly protected species such as floating water-plantain. In Britain, it is classed as Least Concern, although it of international importance. Many of its sites are classified as Sites of Special Scientific Interest, such as the rivers Avon, Itchen, Kennet and the Moors River and river water-dropwort is always considered one of the key species in the designations. It is considered an axiophyte in any British county.

== Habitat and ecology ==
River water-dropwort grows in clean, hard-water lowland rivers, i.e. rivers that drain geological strata with high levels of soluble calcium (chalk, limestone and various soft rocks). In the Alsace region of France, it has been found to be associated with river water-crowfoot, hornwort, fennel pondweed and perfoliate pondweed in the more eutrophic, slow-flowing reaches of that part of the Rhine, where dissolved ammonia (N/NH_{4}) is about 45 μg/L, phosphate (P/PO_{4}) is about 33 μg/L and calcium levels are very high (100 ppm Ca^{++}).

The River Itchen in Hampshire is typical of its habitat in Britain. In this chalk stream it grows in a community of Ranunculus penicillatus, Sparganium emersum, Schoenoplectus lacustris and Groenlandia densa, and it is associated with a wide variety of rare and protected species.

Its Ellenberg values in Britain are L = 8, F = 11, R = 8, N = 6, and S = 0.

== Uses ==
There are very few references to this species in literature, presumably because it is so little-known. However, D.E. Allen reports that an infusion of "water-fennel" was once used in County Wicklow as a treatment for rheumatism, although he questions whether O. fluviatilis was really the plant in question.
