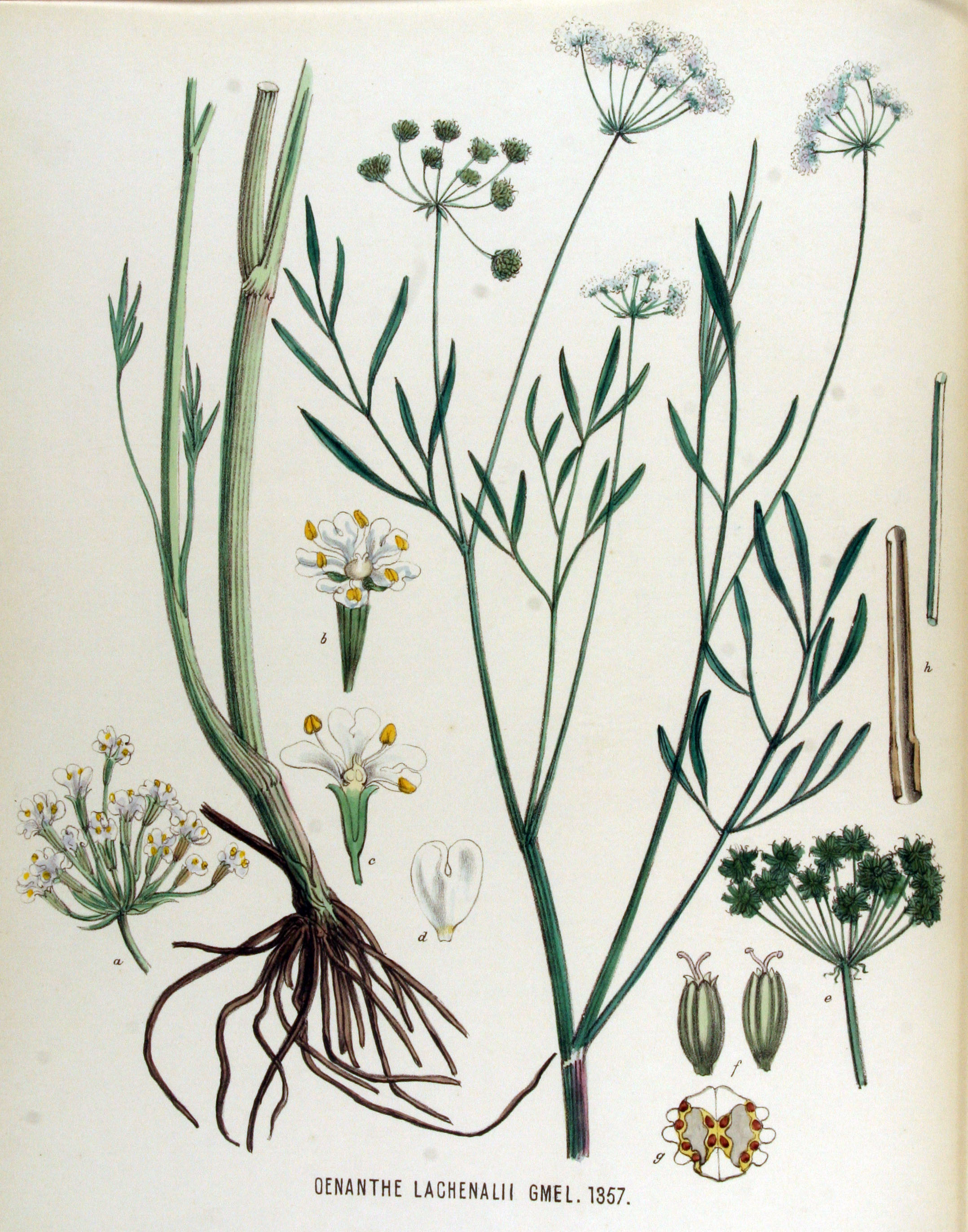

Conservation status
- Least Concern (IUCN 3.1)

Scientific classification
- Kingdom: Plantae
- Clade: Tracheophytes
- Clade: Angiosperms
- Clade: Eudicots
- Clade: Asterids
- Order: Apiales
- Family: Apiaceae
- Genus: Oenanthe
- Species: O. lachenalii

Binomial name
- Oenanthe lachenalii C.C. Gmel.

= Oenanthe lachenalii =

Species of flowering plant

Oenanthe lachenalii, parsley water-dropwort, is a flowering plant in the carrot family, which is native to Europe and parts of North Africa. It is a declining plant of coastal wetlands.

== Description ==
Parsley water-dropwort is a hairless perennial growing up to 100 cm tall with solid (sometimes becoming hollow with age), striated, cylindrical stems 0.4 cm in diameter. The roots are somewhat swollen, cylindrical in shape, but lacking the distinct tubers that occur in some other members of the genus. The upper leaves are once to twice pinnate with simple linear leaflets up to 5 cm long; the lower ones are twice pinnate, with wider, flat leaflets, more like those of other umbellifers. The leaf stalks are shorter than the leaf blade, sheathing the stem at the base, and with a celery scent.

It flowers between June and September in northern Europe, with umbels of 5-9 smaller umbels about 1-2 cm in diameter, each of which has numerous white flowers. There are about 5 awl-shaped bracts on the main umbel and 5-7 small bracteoles at the base of each of the individual umbellules. Plants are monoecious, with hermaphroditic and male flowers in all umbels, but the proportion of hermaphroditic flowers decreases as the season progresses. Each flower has 5 unequal petals with the larger, outer ones slightly larger, 5 stamens and 2 prominent styles arising from a swollen base (stylopodium) at the top of the ovary. After flowering, the flower stalks do not expand (as they do in some other species of water-dropwort) and the umbels do not become flat-topped.

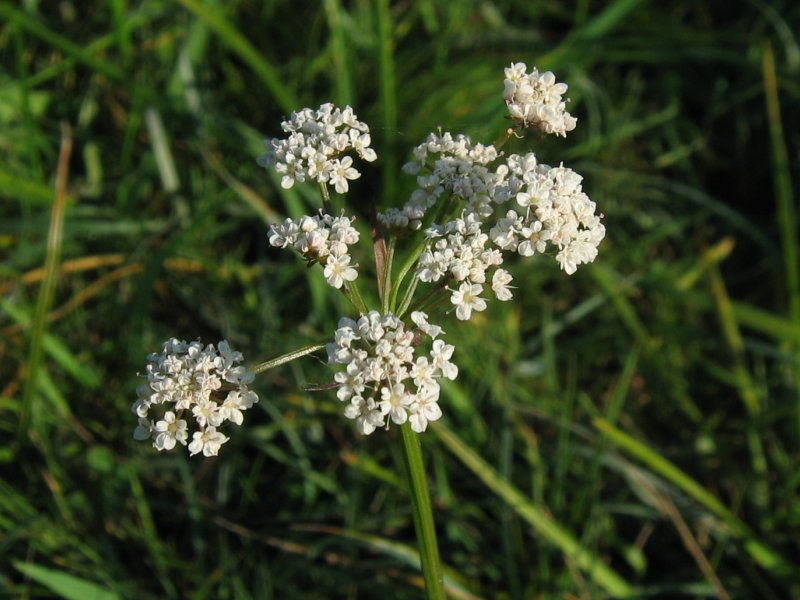
Flowers of parsley water-dropwort

== Identification ==
This species is very similar to narrow-leaved water-dropwort, to the extent that there is often confusion between them. In general, they should be easy to distinguish: parsley water-dropwort usually has bracts on the main umbels, the rays do not thicken after flowering, and the umblets do not become flat-topped in fruit. However, some plants lack bracts and could be difficult to identify in flower. Usually, parsley water-dropwort will have broader (parsley-like) leaflets on the lower leaves early in the year. The best way to confirm identification is from the mature fruit, which are winged in parsley water-dropwort and only ridged in the other species.

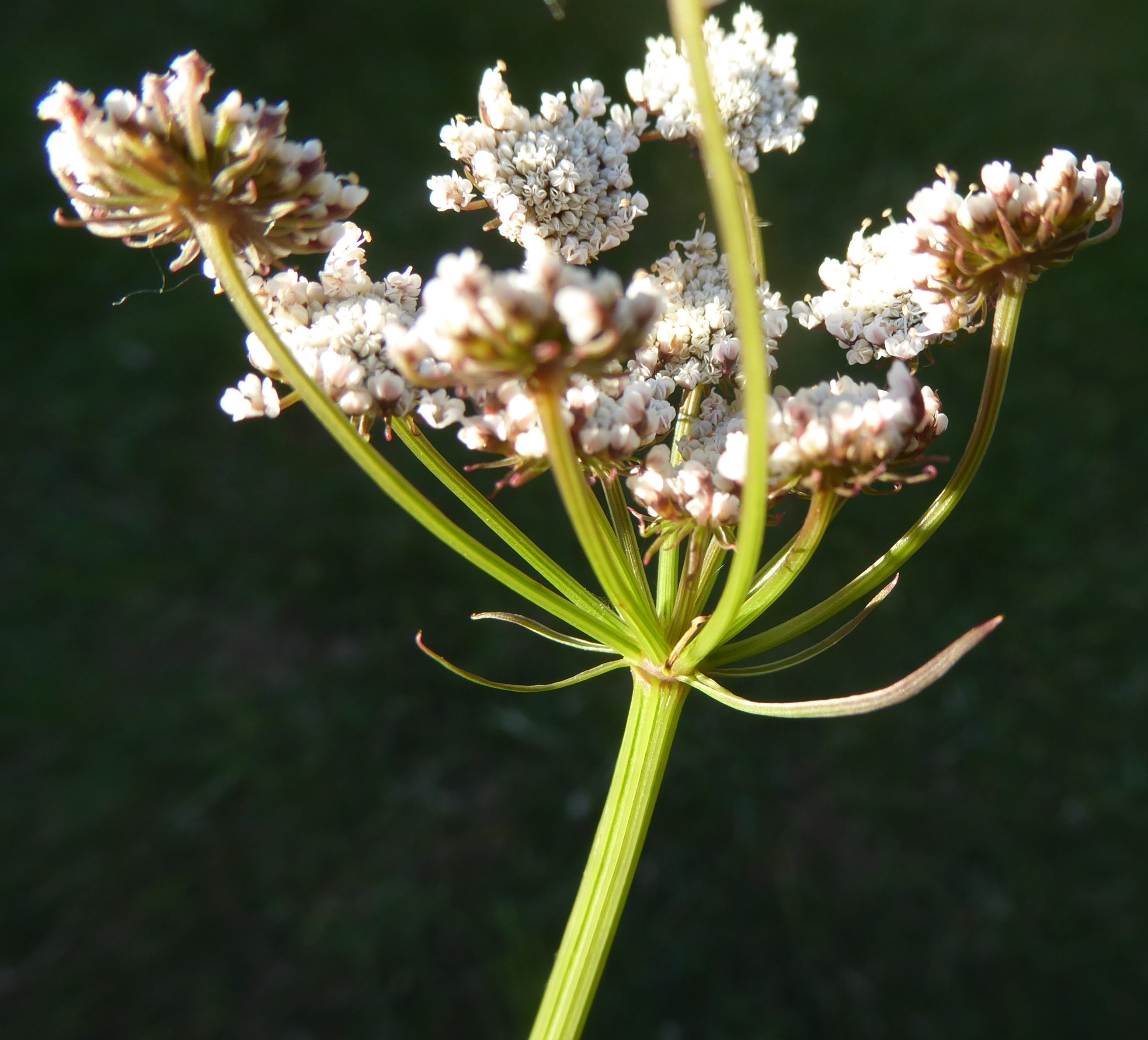
A fresh umbel, showing the bracts

== Taxonomy ==
The first description of parsley water-dropwort was by the German botanist Karl Christian Gmelin in his Flora Badensis Alsatica in 1805. It has many synonyms (i.e. other authors have subsequently named the same plant, but Gmelin's name has precedence), including O. approximata Mérat (1812), O. foucaudii Tess. (1891) Phellandrium tabernaemontani Bubani (1899). A full list can be found in the Synonymic Checklists of the Plants of the World. A few forms and varieties have also been named, but none is currently accepted.

It is not known to hybridise with any other species.

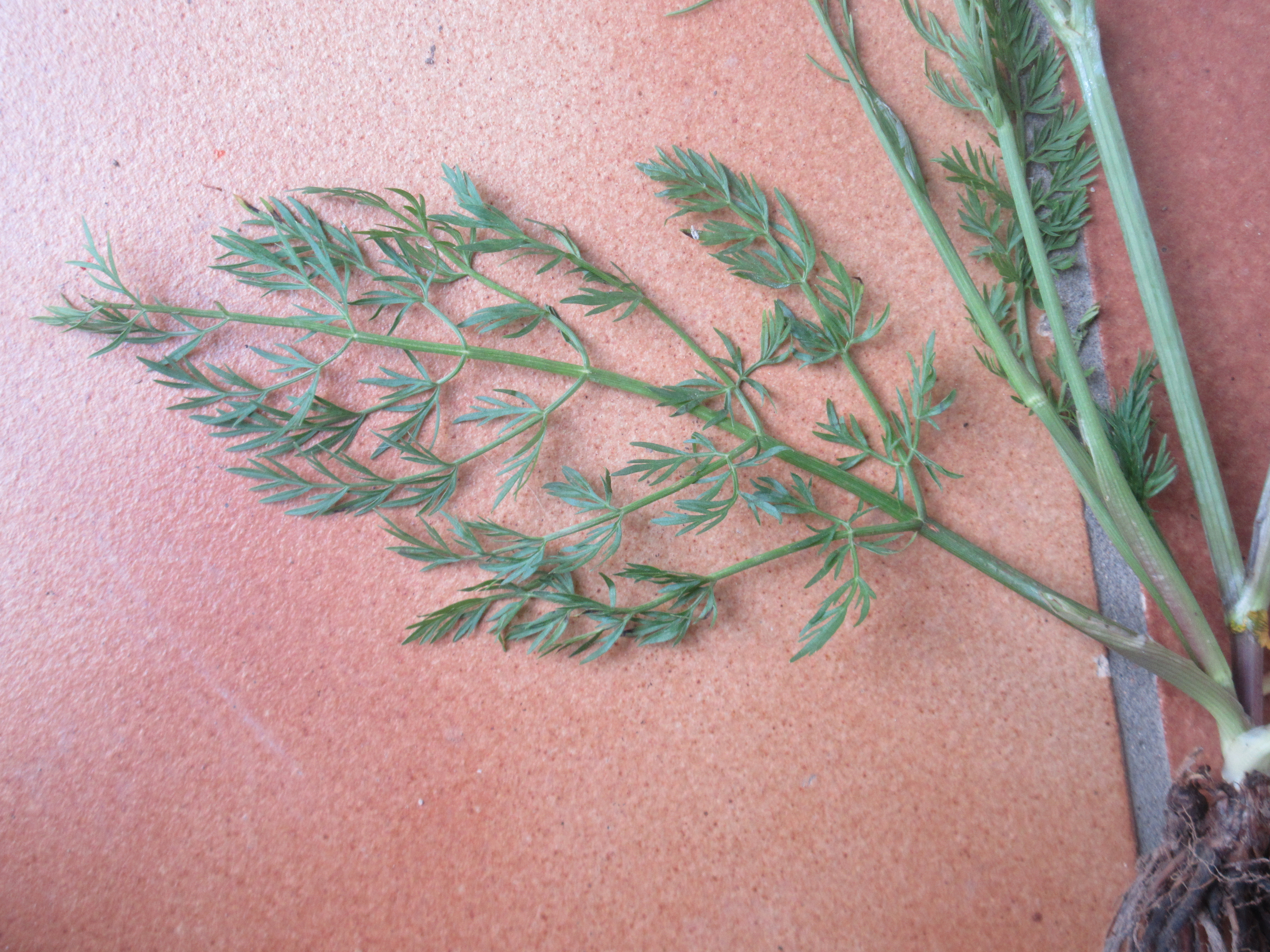
Lower leaf of parsley water-dropwort

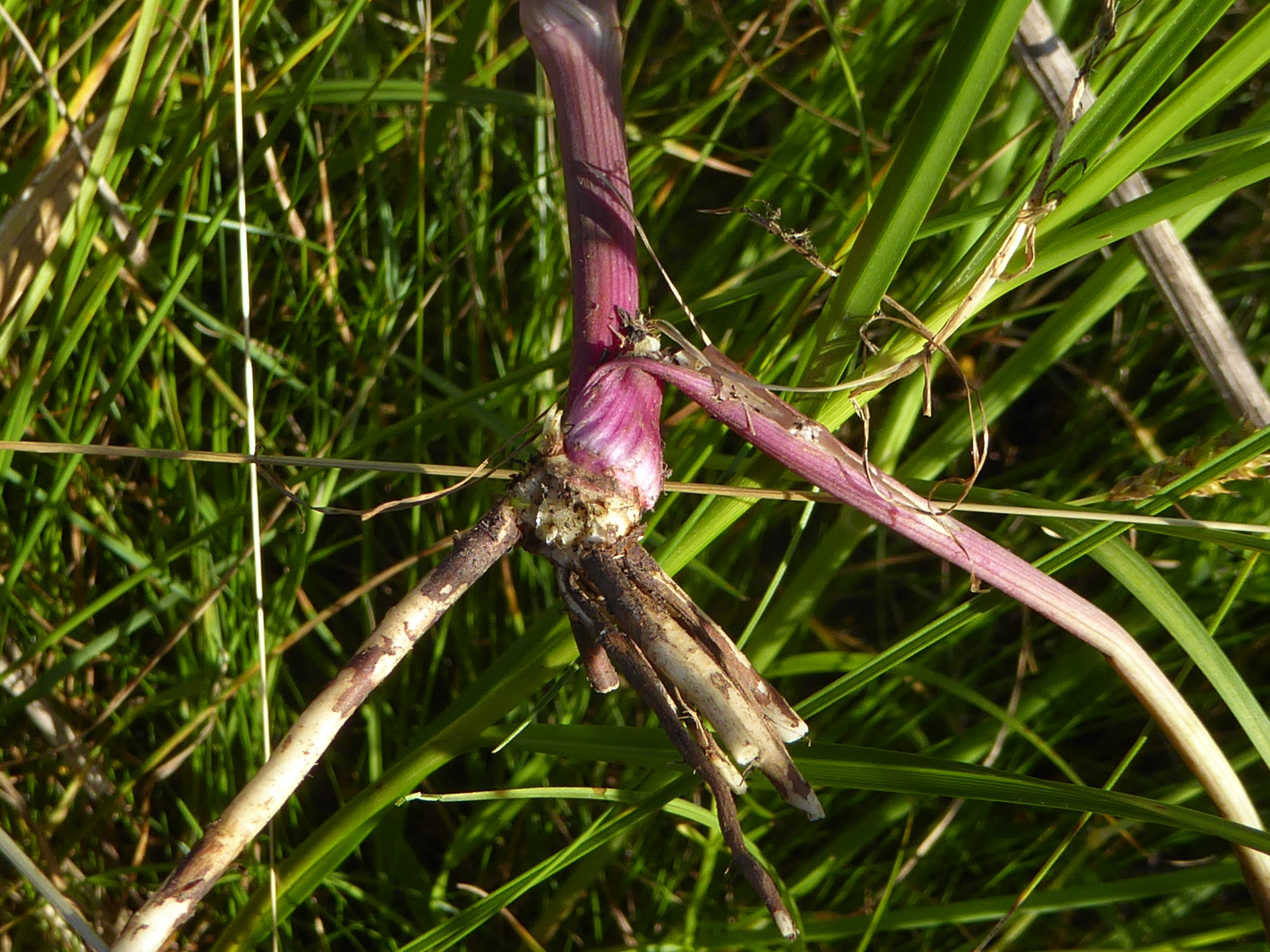
The roots are slightly swollen but do not bear distinct tubers

The generic name Oenanthe, which comes from the Ancient Greek οίνος, "wine" and άνθος, "flower", was used in ancient times for certain Mediterranean plants and later adopted to describe this genus. The "dropwort" part of the common name is a reference to the tubers produced amongst the roots of certain other species in the genus.

Its chromosome number is 2n = 22 (based on British specimens).

== Distribution and status ==
The global range of parsley water-dropwort is in Western Europe as far as Poland and Greece, extending northwards to southern Scandinavia and southwards as far as the coast of Africa. It is not recorded as an introduction beyond its natural range.

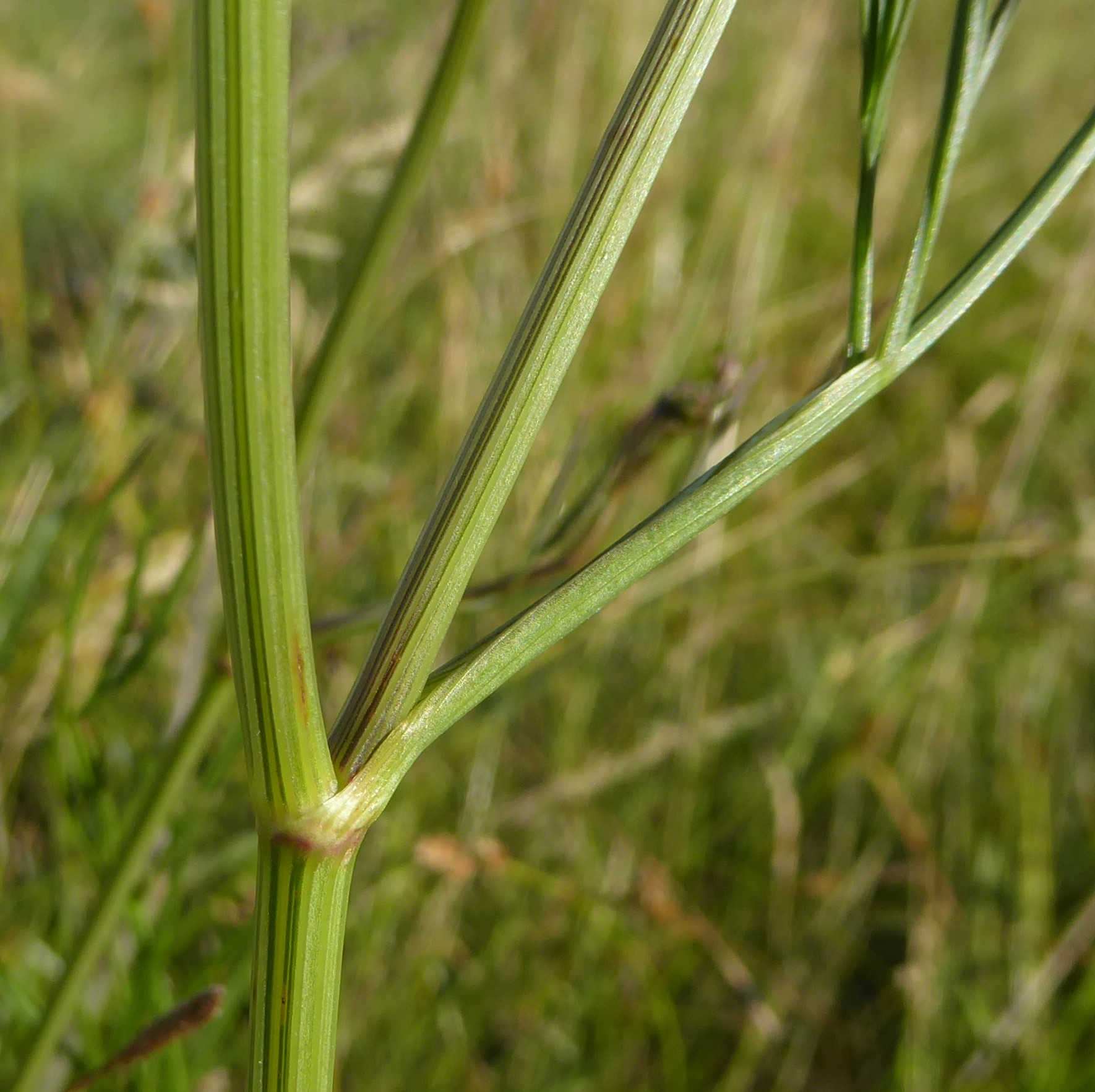
The petioles barely clasp the strongly ribbed stem

In Britain, it is classified as Least Concern, meaning that it is not rare nor declining at a particularly high rate. It is, however, under threat, especially inland. In England, it has been assessed as decreasing by 24% between 1969 and 1999, and in one English county, Kent, by as much as 41%, although it is still not scarce. Causes of decline include drainage of wetlands and agricultural intensification.

It is considered an axiophyte in any British county.

In France, it is widespread and classified as Least Concern, indicating that populations are generally stable, overall. However, it is rare and threatened in some inland régions such as Alsace, where it is Critically Endangered (CR) and Île-de-France (Endangered, EN). In the Auvergne it is thought to be extinct, or 'locally extirpated'.

== Habitat and ecology ==
This is a wetland plant, occurring primarily in slightly brackish grassland close to the coast. It is also found in freshwater inland marshes, particularly in France and Spain. In Britain, its ecological preferences are described as varying from the upper part of salt marshes, through brackish dykes to base-rich fen-meadows inland. It is fairly common around the coast of both Britain and Ireland, with the exception of northern and eastern Scotland.

Its Ellenberg values in Britain are L = 8, F = 8, R = 8, N = 5, and S = 3.

In the Aiguamolls de l'Empordà, in Spain, studies show that it occurs in a variety of habitats, from tall fescue/meadow barley meadows with wild celery, saltmarsh rush and narrow-leaved bird's-foot trefoil, to wetter water finger-grass/divided sedge grassland and through to brackish marsh with annual beard-grass, sea aster and Somerset rush.

== Uses ==
Although it can be a component of hay meadows, parsley water-dropwort is considered to be poisonous to livestock, albeit not as toxic as hemlock water-dropwort. No part of the plant is edible by humans, and it appears to have no commercial uses.
