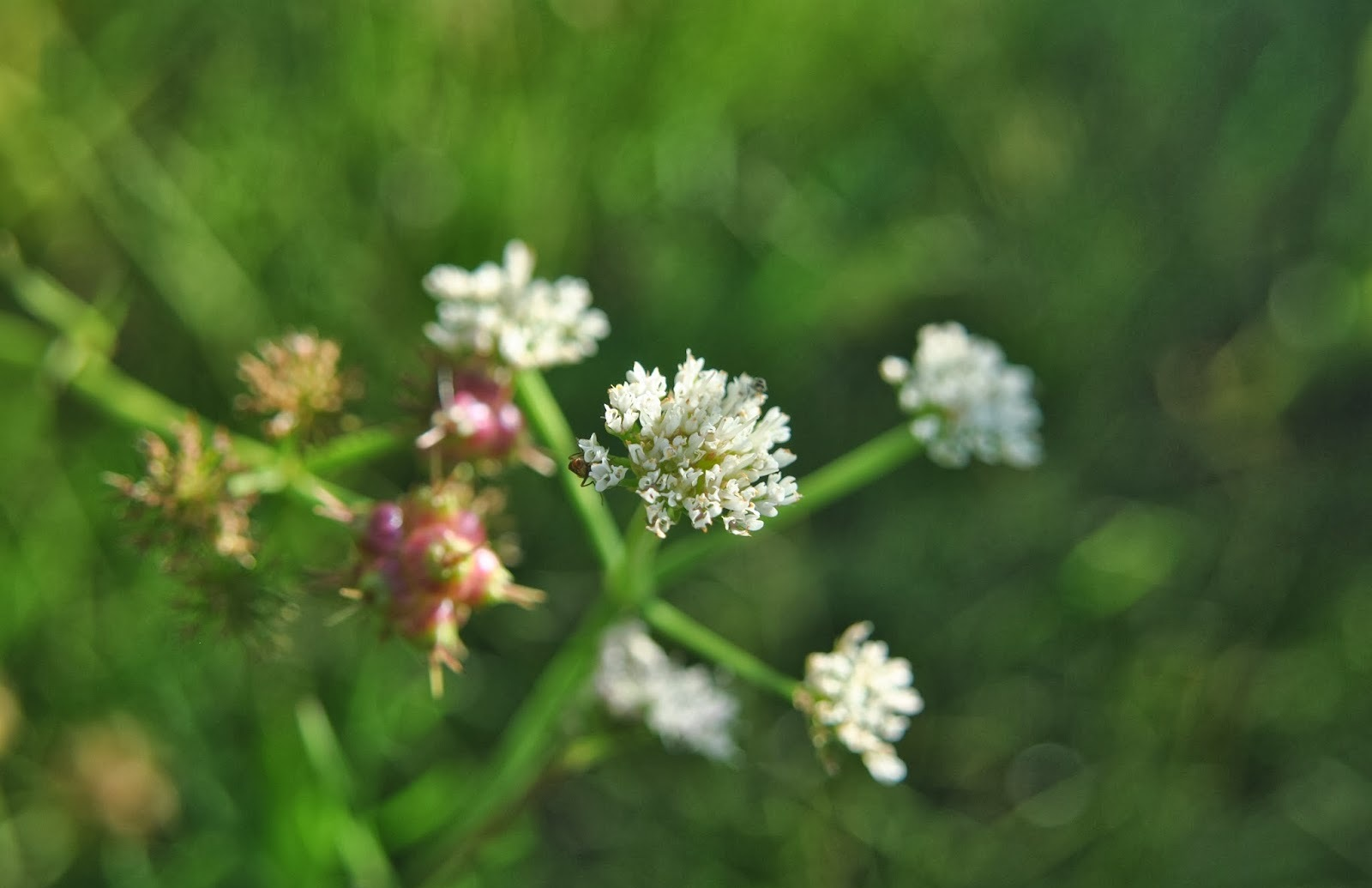
- In Montevideo, Uruguay

Scientific classification
- Kingdom: Plantae
- Clade: Tracheophytes
- Clade: Angiosperms
- Clade: Eudicots
- Clade: Asterids
- Order: Apiales
- Family: Apiaceae
- Genus: Oenanthe
- Species: O. globulosa

Binomial name
- Oenanthe globulosa L.

Synonyms
- Globocarpus oenanthoides

= Oenanthe globulosa =

Species of plant

Oenanthe globulosa is a species of perennial herb in the family Apiaceae. They have a self-supporting growth form and simple, broad leaves.

== Sources ==
This article incorporates text from a free content work. Licensed under CC0 (license statement/permission). Text taken from Oenanthe globulosa. Encyclopedia of Life.
