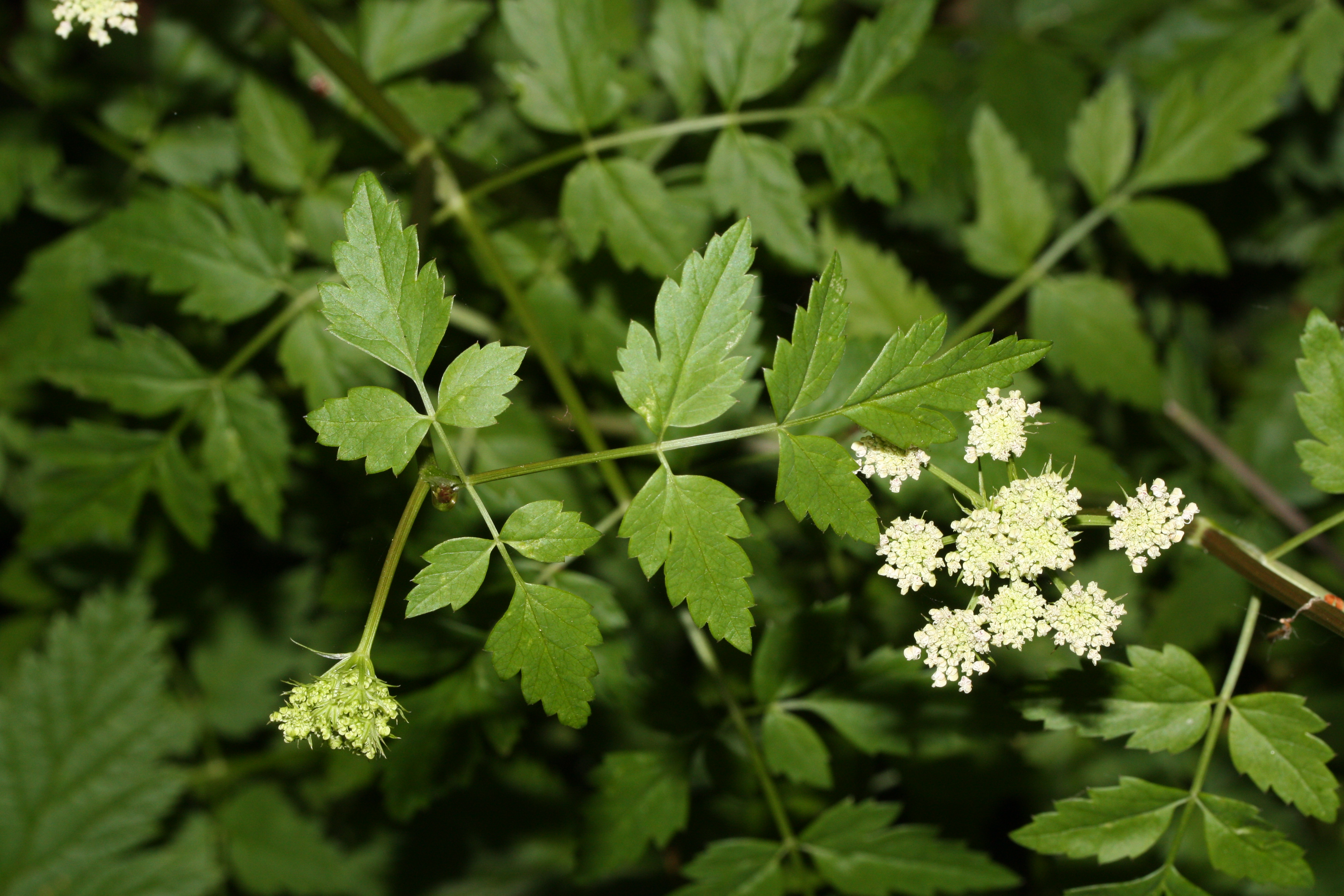

Scientific classification
- Kingdom: Plantae
- Clade: Tracheophytes
- Clade: Angiosperms
- Clade: Eudicots
- Clade: Asterids
- Order: Apiales
- Family: Apiaceae
- Genus: Oenanthe
- Species: O. sarmentosa

Binomial name
- Oenanthe sarmentosa C.Presl ex DC.

= Oenanthe sarmentosa =

Species of flowering plant

Oenanthe sarmentosa is a species of flowering plant in the family Apiaceae known by the common name water parsley. It is native to western North America from Alaska to California, where it grows in wet areas, such as streambanks. It is sometimes aquatic, growing in the water. The plant has been used in cultivation in wetlands, and the recent discovery of several colonies growing by a stream in Illinois demonstrates its capacity to become a noxious weed if it is introduced elsewhere. This is a perennial herb growing to a maximum height near 1.5 meters. The leaves have blades up to 30 centimeters long borne on petioles up to 35 centimeters in length. The parsley-like leaf blade is divided into serrated, lobed leaflets. The inflorescence is a compound umbel of many flowers with bright white to red-tinged petals.
