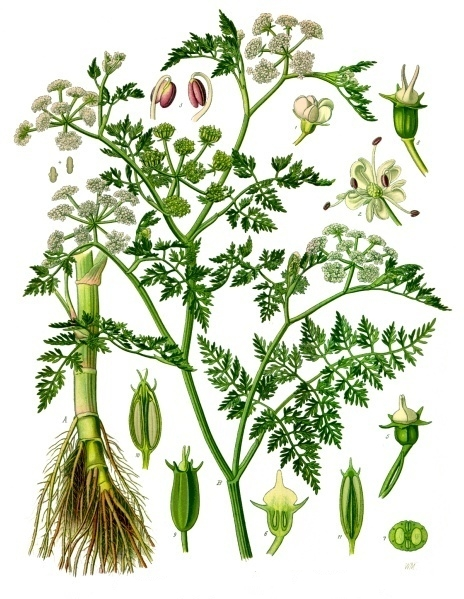
- Oenanthe aquatica

Scientific classification
- Kingdom: Plantae
- Clade: Tracheophytes
- Clade: Angiosperms
- Clade: Eudicots
- Clade: Asterids
- Order: Apiales
- Family: Apiaceae
- Subfamily: Apioideae
- Tribe: Oenantheae
- Genus: Oenanthe; L.

Synonyms
- List: Dasyloma DC.; Globocarpus Caruel; Karsthia Raf.; Oenosciadium Pomel; Phellandrium L.; Stephanorossia Chiov.; Volkensiella H.Wolff; Cyssopetalum Turcz.

= Oenanthe (plant) =

Genus of flowering plants

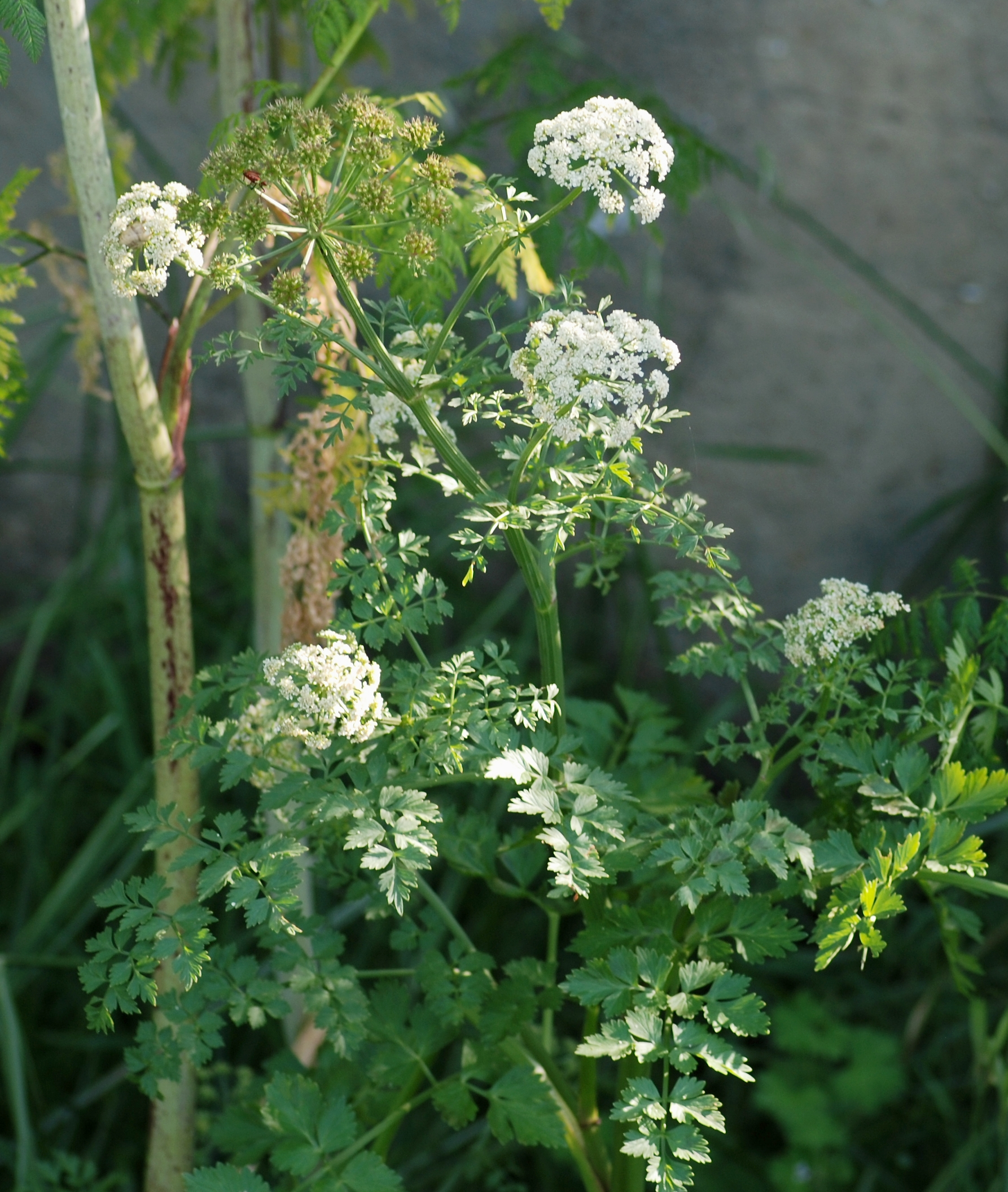
Contrast between hemlock water dropwort (Oenanthe crocata, right) and poison hemlock (Conium maculatum, spotted stems on left)

Oenanthe, known as water dropworts, oenanthes, water parsleys, and water celeries, are a genus of plants in the family Apiaceae. Most of the species grow in damp ground, such as in marshes or in water.

Several of the species are extremely poisonous, the active poison being oenanthotoxin. The most notable of these is O. crocata, which lives in damp, marshy ground, and resembles celery with roots like a bunch of large white carrots. The leaves may be eaten safely by livestock, but the stems, and especially the carbohydrate-rich roots are much more poisonous. Animals familiar with eating the leaves may eat the roots when these are exposed during ditch clearance: one root is sufficient to kill a cow, and human fatalities are also known. It has been referred to as the most poisonous of all British plants, and is considered particularly dangerous because of its similarity to several edible plants.

The species O. javanica, commonly known as Chinese celery or Japanese parsley (seri; not to be confused with mitsuba or Japanese wild celery, Cryptotaenia japonica) is edible and grown in several countries of eastern Asia, as well as in Italy and India, where the spring growth is relished as a vegetable.

== Taxonomy and naming ==
The name "Oenanthe" was used in ancient times to refer to several different plants, one of which was described by Pedanius Dioscorides as having "white flowers... and many round heads." This was [mis]interpreted by medieval herbalists as dropwort or an umbellifer. By the 18th century it was being widely used for water-dropworts. For example, in Hortus Cliffortianus hemlock water-dropwort was called Oenanthe foliis omnibus multifidis obtusis subaequalidus. Linnaeus formalised it as a generic name in Species Plantarum in 1753.

Although the word is ultimately derived from the Ancient Greek οίνος, "wine" and άνθος, "flower", this has no meaning when applied to the water-dropworts other than as an arbitrary name for the genus. Subsequent speculation that it refers to the smell of the flowers or intoxication caused by these plants are probably mistaken.

The word "dropwort" refers to the tubers produced amongst the roots of certain species in the genus.

=== Species ===
As of 2020, Kew's Plants of the World Online accepts 33 species of Oenanthe:

- Oenanthe abchasica Schischk.
- Oenanthe aquatica (L.) Poir.
- Oenanthe banatica Heuff.
- Oenanthe benghalensis (DC.) Miq.
- Oenanthe crocata L.
- Oenanthe cyclocarpa Pimenov & Kljuykov
- Oenanthe fedtschenkoana Koso-Pol.
- Oenanthe fistulosa L.
- Oenanthe fluviatilis (Bab.) Coleman
- Oenanthe foucaudii Tess.
- Oenanthe globulosa L.
- Oenanthe hookeri C.B.Clarke
- Oenanthe incrassans Bory & Chaub.
- Oenanthe incrassata Bory & Chaub.
- Oenanthe javanica (Blume) DC.
- Oenanthe lachenalii C.C.Gmel.
- Oenanthe linearis Wall. ex DC.
- Oenanthe lisae Moris
- Oenanthe mildbraedii H.Wolff
- Oenanthe millefolia Janka
- Oenanthe montis-khortiati Soldano
- Oenanthe palustris (Chiov.) C.Norman
- Oenanthe peucedanifolia Pollich
- Oenanthe pimpinelloides L.
- Oenanthe pringlei J.M.Coult. & Rose
- Oenanthe procumbens (H.Wolff) C.Norman
- Oenanthe prolifera L.
- Oenanthe sarmentosa C.Presl ex DC.
- Oenanthe silaifolia M.Bieb.
- Oenanthe sophiae Schischk.
- Oenanthe thomsonii C.B.Clarke
- Oenanthe tricholoba Greuter
- Oenanthe virgata Poir.

== Identification ==
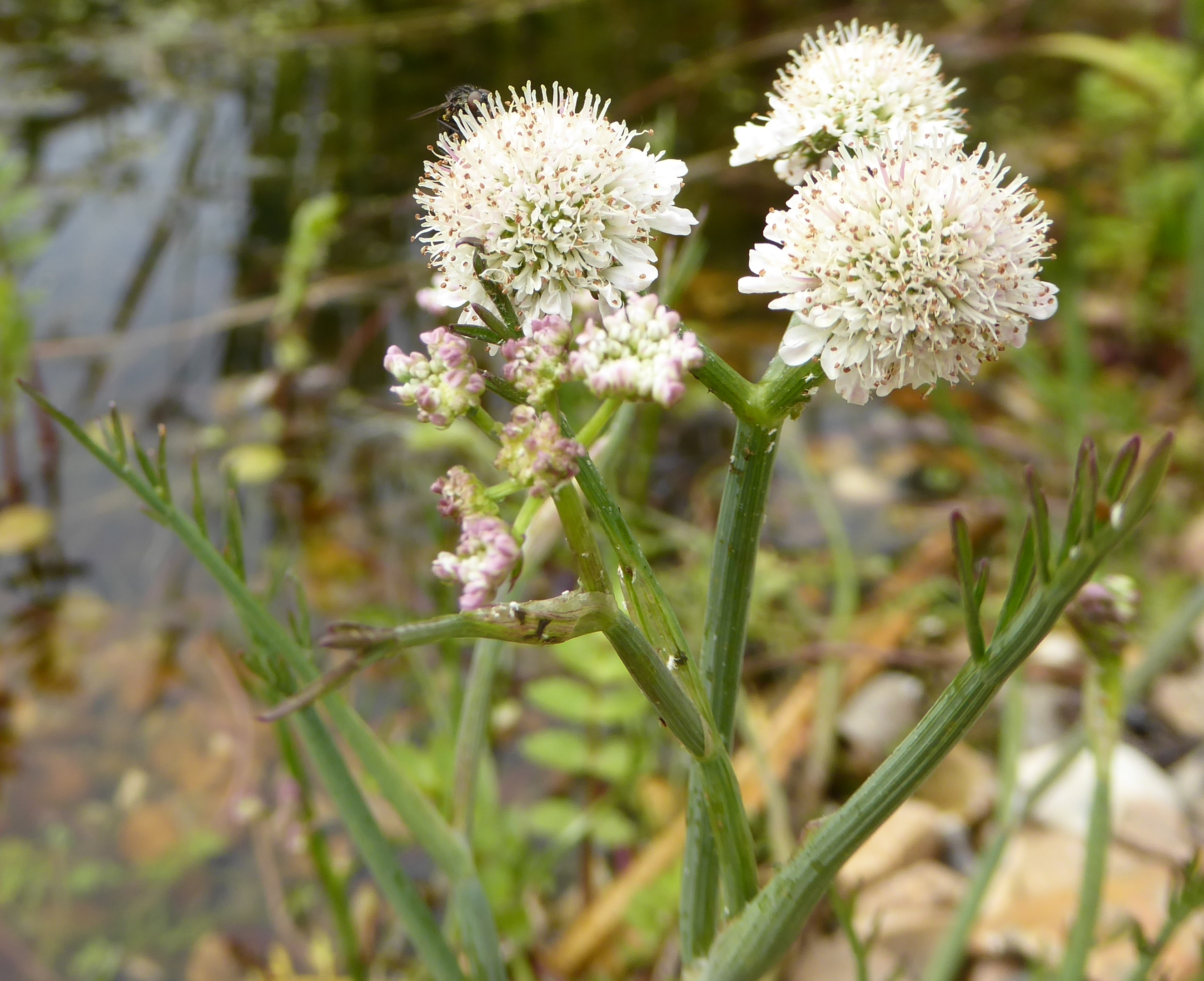
Tubular water-dropwort inflorescence, showing the lack of bracts, the stalks (rays) of the umbels, and the narrow segments of the upper leaves

The following simplified key can be used to distinguish the six British water-dropworts, by eliminating them one by one. To use the key, a few terms are needed: bracts are small, leaf-like appendages at the bottom of the primary umbels; rays are the branches of the primary umbels; petioles are leaf stalks. Refer to the notes on the species pages to confirm the identification.

1. Plants with bracts and ovate leaflets... O. crocata

2. Plants with bracts and narrow leaflets, rays thickening in fruit... O. pimpinelloides

3. Plants with bracts and narrow leaflets, rays not thickening in fruit... O. lachenalii

4. No bracts, upper leaves with ovate segments... O. aquatica

5. No bracts, upper leaves with narrow segments, petiole hollow... O. fistulosa

6. No bracts, upper leaves with narrow segments, petiole solid, rays thickening in fruit... O. silaifolia

7. No bracts, upper leaves with narrow segments, petiole solid, rays not thickening in fruit... O. lachenalii

== Sardonic grin ==
Scientists at the University of Eastern Piedmont wrote that they had identified hemlock water dropwort (Oenanthe crocata) as the plant responsible for producing the sardonic grin. This plant is a possible candidate for the "sardonic herb", which was a neurotoxic plant referred to in ancient histories. It was purportedly used for the ritual killing of elderly people and criminals in Nuragic Sardinia, in which they were intoxicated with the herb and then dropped from a high rock or beaten to death.

== Fossil record ==
Oenanthe aquatica fossil fruit halves have been recorded from Upper Miocene of Bulgaria, Pliocene of Thuringia and the Pliocene and Pleistocene of Poland.

== Gallery ==
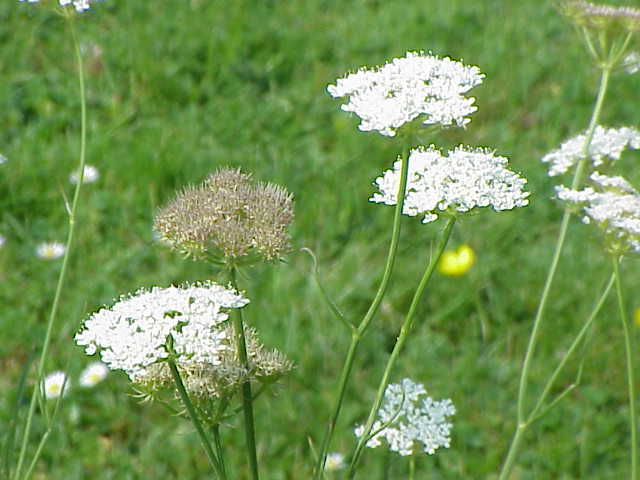
Corky-fruited water dropwort (Oenanthe pimpinelloides)

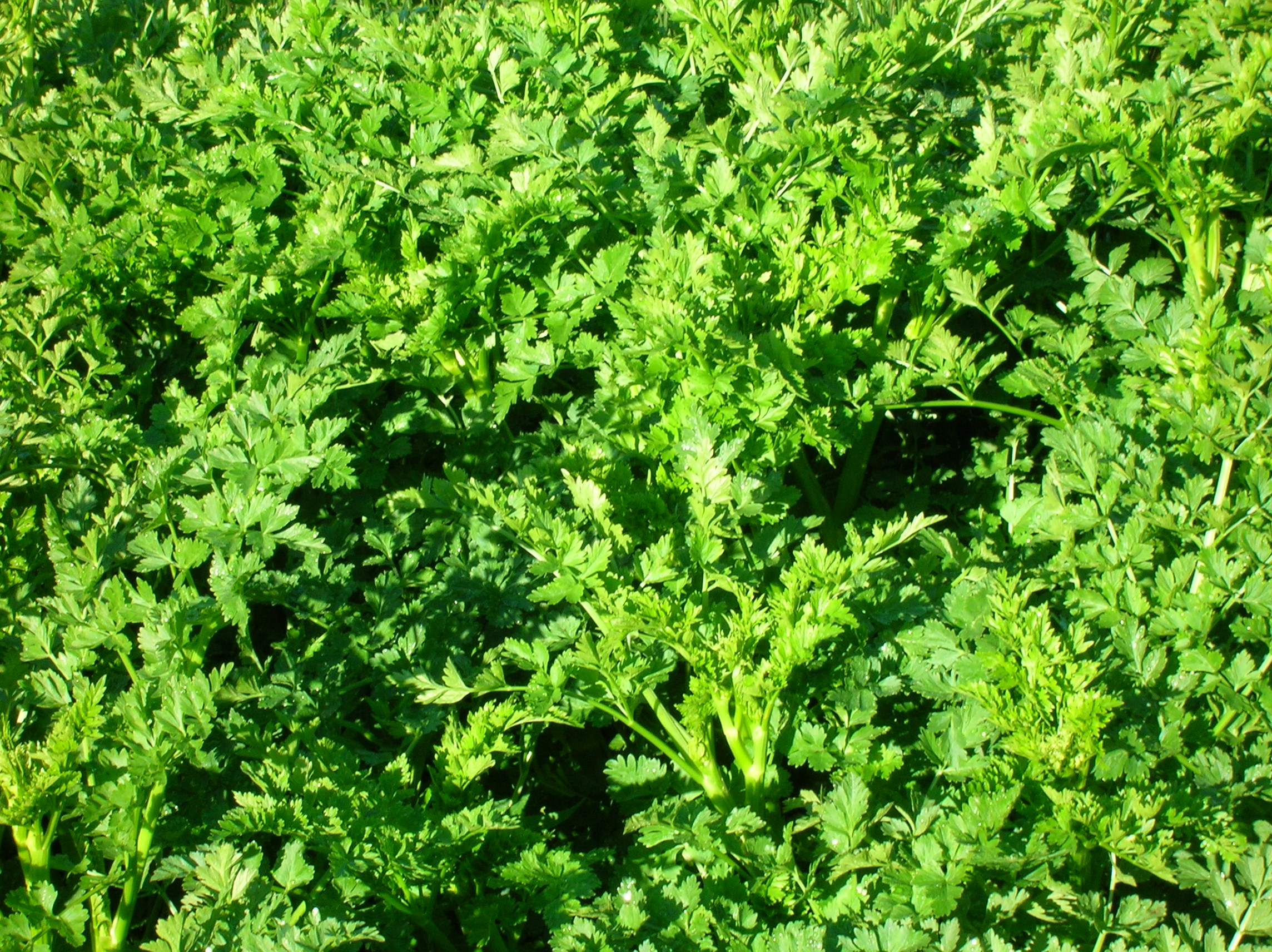
Hemlock water dropwort (Oenanthe crocata) in spring
