= Axiophyte =

Plant that indicates an area with high conservation interest

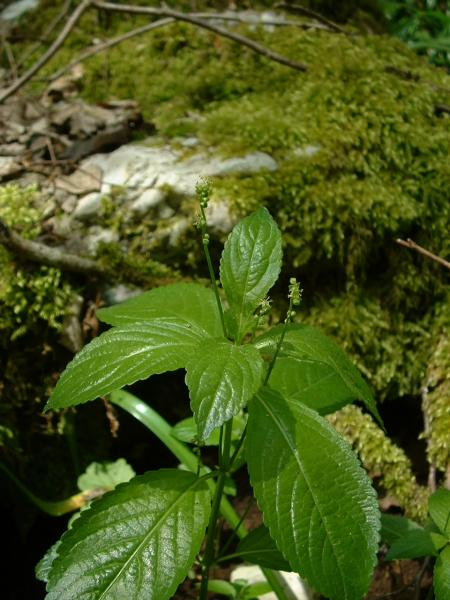
Dog's mercury, an axiophyte associated with ancient woodlands in the UK

An axiophyte (Greek: "worthy plant") is a plant that is of particular interest to botanists, conservationists and ecologists. The significance of axiophytes is from their strong association with habitats considered to be of high merit for conservation. Axiophytes are a relatively recent concept which has its roots in such ideas as "ancient woodland indicator species". According to the Botanical Society of Britain and Ireland (BSBI), around 40% of plant species can be considered axiophytes.

Very rare species are not considered axiophytes; for a species to be a useful indicator of quality habitat it must be relatively frequent in those habitats, but scarce elsewhere. A typical example would be dog's mercury (Mercurialis perennis), a plant slow to colonise new sites, but common in ancient woodland and old hedgerows.

The number of axiophytes on a site provides a crude, but convenient, measure of its nature conservation importance. It is a particularly useful approach when comparing otherwise similar sites. Over time axiophyte numbers can be used for monitoring. They have been used as a metric for evaluating the ecological value of areas at a landscape scale and in setting strategic conservation priorities

The BSBI gives the following criteria for axiophytes:

- 90% restricted to these conservation habitats;
- Recorded in fewer than 25% of tetrads in the county.

(An exception to the 25% rule can be made for species in conservation habitats that are particularly well represented and widespread in the county.)

The concept of axiophytes appears not to have been used outside the UK, but it offers the potential to assist in setting conservation priorities in any area, although local work would be needed to set appropriate criteria.

== See also ==
- Indicator species
