= Titchfield Abbey =

Medieval abbey in Hampshire, England

Coordinates: 50.856°N 1.232°W

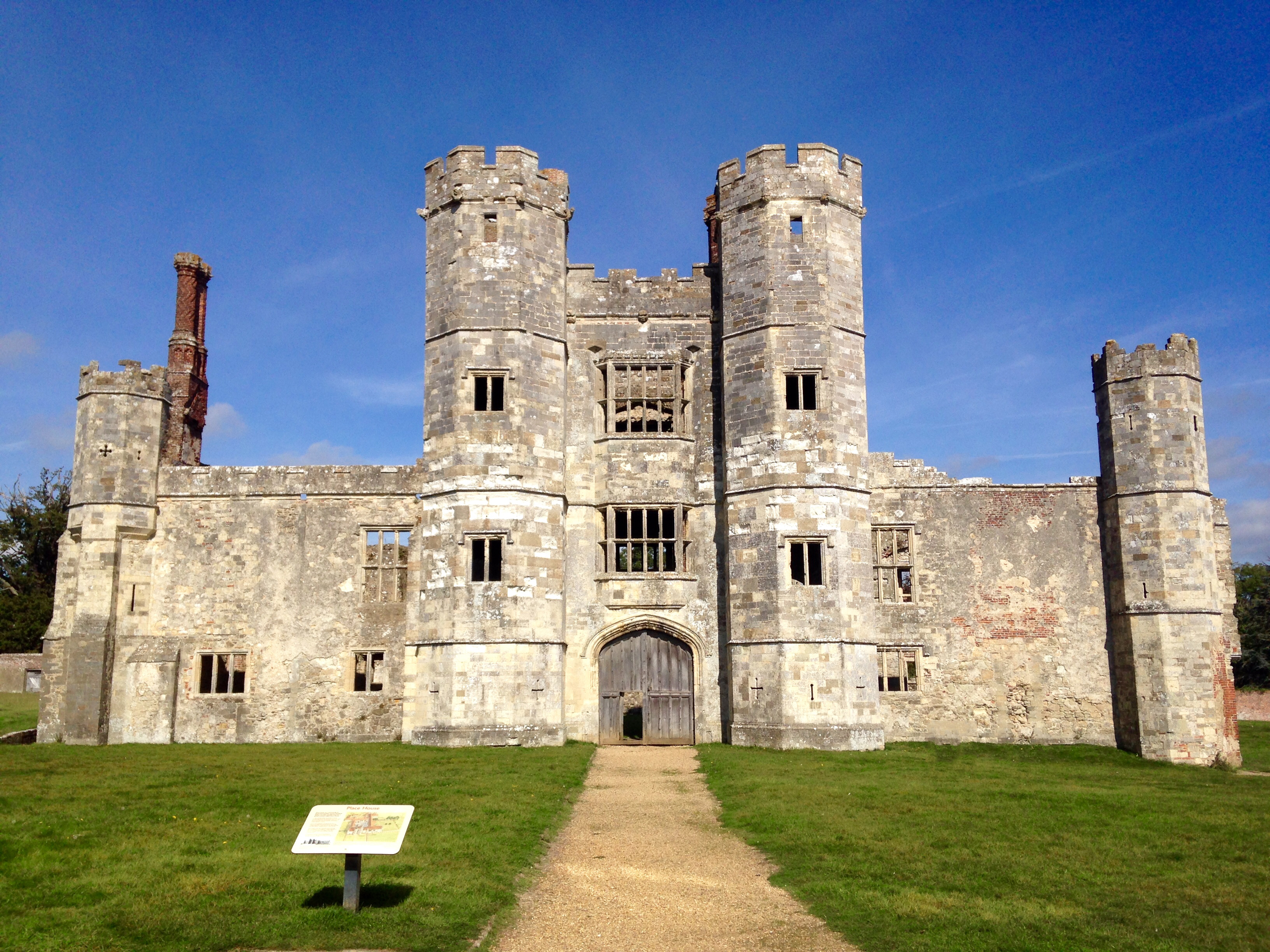
- Titchfield Abbey in October 2014
- Interactive map of Titchfield Abbey

Monastery information
- Full name: The Abbey Church of the Assumption of the Blessed Virgin, Titchfield
- Other name: Place House (post-monastic period)
- Order: Premonstratensian
- Established: 1222
- Disestablished: 1537
- Mother house: Halesowen Abbey
- Dedication: The Assumption of the Blessed Virgin
- Diocese: Diocese of Winchester

People
- Founder: Peter des Roches
- Important associated figures: William Shakespeare, Henry VI, Margaret of Anjou, Charles I, Thomas Wriothesley, Henry Wriothesley

Site
- Location: Titchfield, Hampshire, United Kingdom
- Visible remains: nave of church, ruins of east range, foundations and massive Tudor gatehouse of post-Dissolution mansion
- Public access: yes, (English Heritage)

Titchfield Abbey is a medieval abbey and later country house, located in the village of Titchfield near Fareham in Hampshire, England. The abbey was founded in 1222 for Premonstratensian canons, an austere order of priests. The abbey was a minor house of its order, and became neither wealthy nor influential during its three centuries of monastic life; the inhabitants were devoted to scholarship, as shown by their very impressive library.

The abbey was closed in 1537 by King Henry VIII during the dissolution of the monasteries and the building was converted into a mansion by Thomas Wriothesley, a powerful courtier. Later in the sixteenth century the mansion was home to Henry Wriothesley, who was a patron of William Shakespeare. In 1781 the mansion was abandoned and partially demolished. The remains were purchased by the government in the early twentieth century and are now a Scheduled Ancient Monument under the care of English Heritage.

== Foundation ==
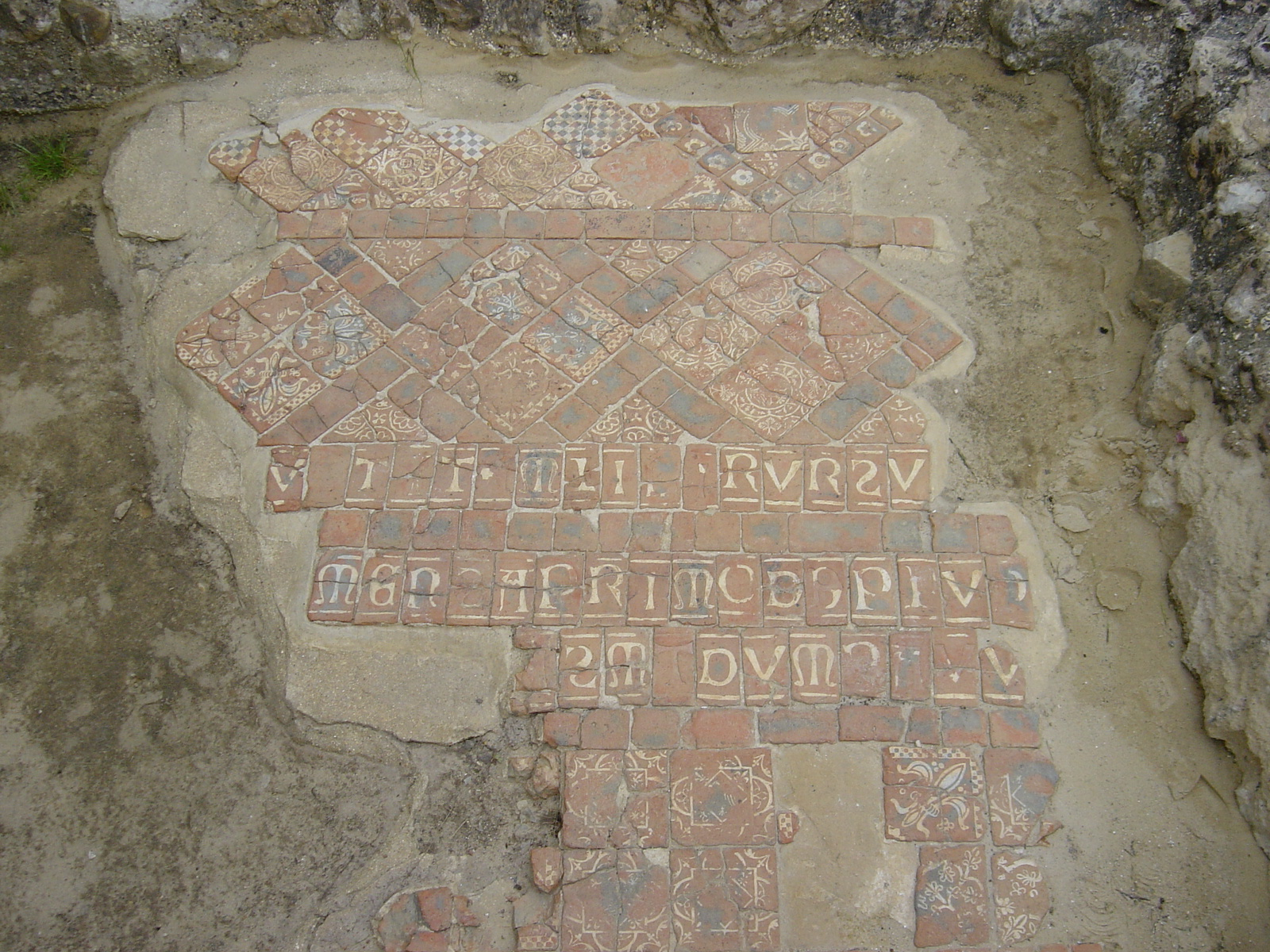
Medieval tiles in Titchfield Abbey located in front of the door to the refectory. The Latin inscription reminds the canons to remember the poor before they sat down to eat.

The builder of the abbey was Bishop Peter des Roches of Winchester, a powerful politician, churchman and government official who founded several religious houses, including Netley Abbey (1236), also in Hampshire, Halesowen Abbey (1214) in Worcestershire and La Clarté-Dieu (1236) in his native France.

In 1222 the first inhabitants of the new monastery, under the leadership of Abbot Richard, arrived from Halesowen Abbey. They were not monks, instead they were canons regular belonging to the Premonstratensian order (also known as the 'white canons' from the colour of their robes and Norbertines from the name of their founder, St. Norbert). They lived communally, following a very strict interpretation of the Rule of St Augustine, but in addition to engaging in a life of study and prayer within their abbeys, they also had a pastoral mission and served as parish priests ministering to the spiritual needs of the laity. The order was well known for the austerity of the lives led by its members, something that made it – as with the Cistercians – especially popular with wealthy benefactors in the twelfth and early thirteenth centuries.

Bishop Peter held one of the richest bishoprics in the mediaeval church and so was in a position to be generous in the endowment of his new abbey. He not only gave the manor of Titchfield itself but also extensive lands dotted around Hampshire, and this property was expanded by major grants from local aristocrats and King Henry III (who also granted the monastery important legal privileges in 1231), with the result that Titchfield was placed on a firm financial footing from the beginning.

== Abbey buildings ==
With stone hard to come by in the county of Hampshire, the abbey was built mainly using stone brought in from neighbouring Dorset, the Isle of Wight and even as far afield as Caen in France. The abbey buildings were centred around the church, which was comparatively small and lacking in grandeur. It was cruciform in plan with a narrow, aisle-less nave, a short eastern arm, six side chapels in the transepts and a tower with bells. It was in some ways a rather old fashioned design and deliberately austere, perhaps reflecting the strict doctrines of the order at the period of construction. Though it was restored once after nearly falling to ruin, unlike many of their fellows the canons of Titchfield never succumbed to the desire to create an elaborate new church in the later Middle Ages and kept their original building until the end of monastic life at the abbey.

North of the church stood a cloister surrounded on three sides by the domestic buildings of the house, including the chapter house, dormitory, kitchen, refectory, library, food storage rooms and quarters for the abbot. Though not large, the surviving ruins show that the abbey buildings were of very high quality with fine masonry and carving. As the Middle Ages progressed considerable investment was made to upgrade the domestic buildings to meet rising living standards, and it is probable that by the mid fourteenth century they were rather luxurious, as evidenced by the elaborate polychrome floor tiles (an expensive and high status product) still seen today all over the site.

The central core of the monastery was surrounded by a walled precinct containing gardens, fishponds (several of which still survive close to the abbey buildings), orchards, barns, guesthouses, stables, a farmyard and industrial buildings. Entrance to the abbey was strictly controlled by several gatehouses.

== Monastic history ==
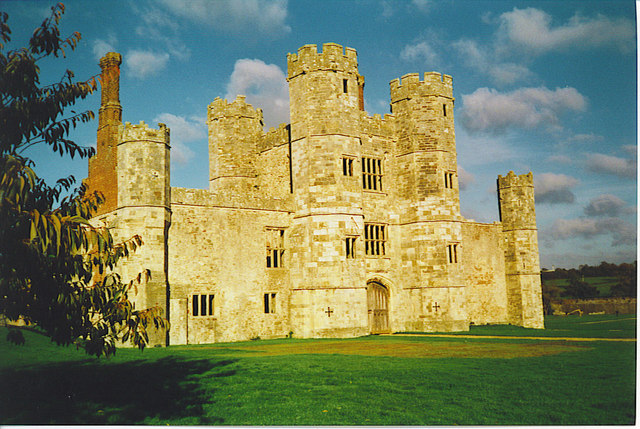
Wriothesley's gatehouse - a vital symbol of seigneurial power for an early 16th-century courtier's house, cuts through the nave of the Premonstratensian canons' church, seen left and right of the tower. The choir, transepts and altar - now lost - were on the right of the picture

The internal affairs of the abbey seem to have been largely quiet. It was generally well run over its history and maintained a good reputation for the life led by its canons. As with other Premonstratensian houses, Titchfield Abbey was visited once a year by the father-abbot from the parent house (in this case Halesowen Abbey); or instead, in certain years, by a commission of the General Chapter of Prémontré, the headquarters of the Premonstratensian Order. The abbey remained tolerably solvent for most of its existence, however, in common with many religious houses and secular lords it experienced severe financial difficulties in the latter half of the 14th century and the early 15th century due to the economic and social crisis resulting from the effects of the Black Death. The scale of the disaster can be judged by the fact that on the Titchfield estates in the plague years of 1348-1349 close to 60% of the tenants died, together with a vast number of animals, and when the plague returned in 1361-1362 the agricultural population took another massive hit. When John Poole, abbot of the mother house of Halesowen Abbey inspected Titchfield in summer 1420 he found the coffers empty, the abbey's accounts deeply in the red and the barns and storehouses nearly empty of food and fodder. Despite this, in the following years the canons managed to retrieve the situation and in the last years of its existence Titchfield was again prosperous. Inspections by senior abbots of the order from 1478 to 1502 noted that Titchfield was excellently managed, discipline was good and the finances were in order.

The abbey's location near Southampton and Portsmouth made it a convenient stopping place for journeys from England to continental Europe and it hence received many important visitors. Richard II and Queen Anne stayed at the abbey in 1393, and Henry V was a guest on his way to Southampton to invade France in 1415. On 23 April 1445, the abbey church was the venue for a royal wedding; the marriage of Henry VI to Margaret of Anjou was celebrated there by William Ayscough, Bishop of Salisbury.

== Library ==
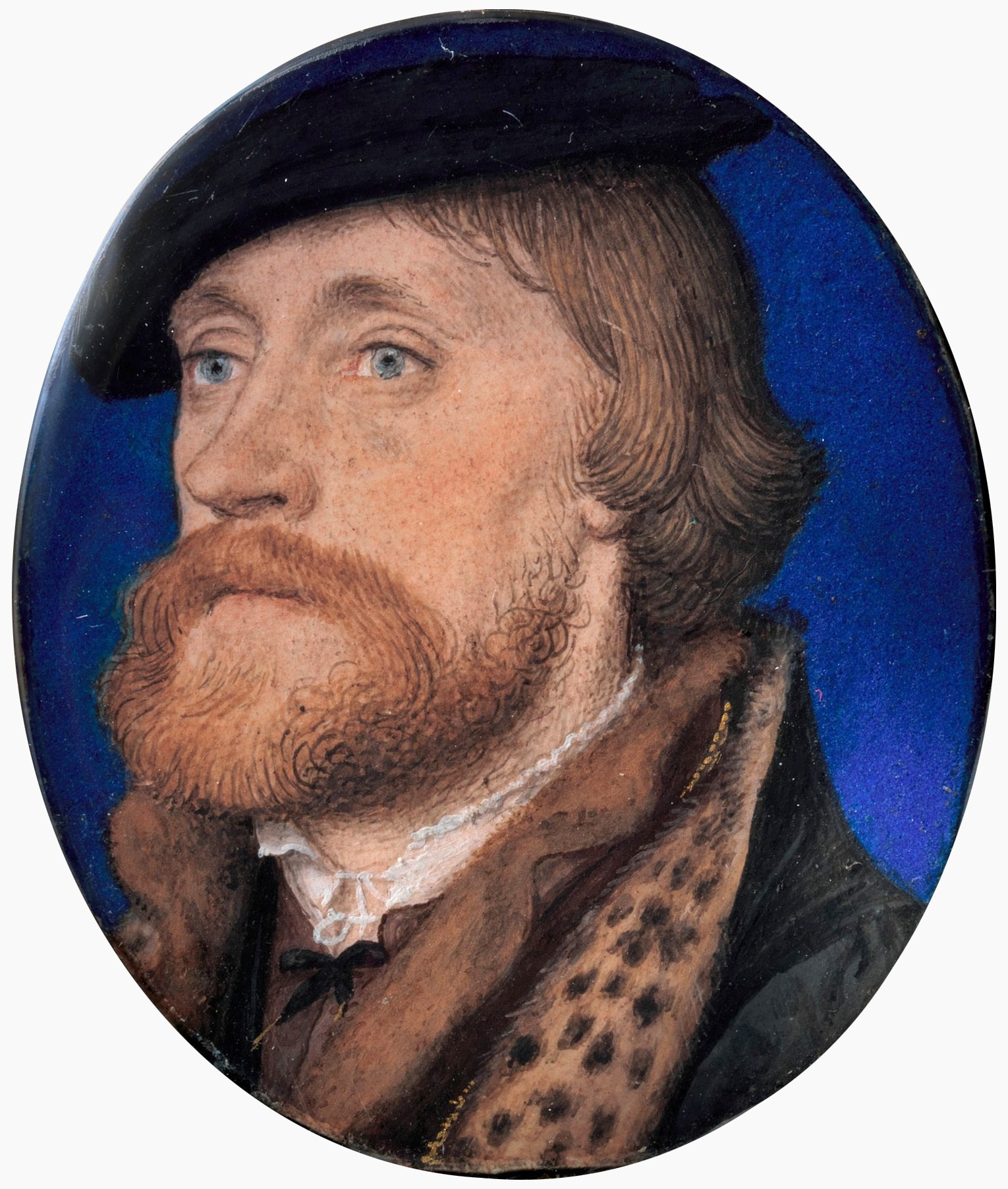
Thomas Wriothesley, 1st Earl of Southampton, who gained control of the abbey after the dissolution of the monasteries and made it his home. Portrait by Hans Holbein the Younger.

The Premonstratensians placed great emphasis on scholarship and the canons of Titchfield possessed a very impressive library, the catalogue for which survives. There were 224 volumes, each containing a number of different works bound together, as was common in the period, and some must have been very large to contain all the works recorded for them. The books were systematically organised by subject, shelf and location in the library room (probably the chamber between the chapter house and the church as this was the traditional location). There were books in Latin, English and French covering theology, church history, writings of the Fathers of the Church, medicine, law, philosophy, grammar, travel, legends, romances and records of the abbey. The canons also had another collection of more than 100 books used for services that they kept in the church. A library on this scale was huge for the period and is surprising for a minor house like Titchfield. It compares closely, for instance, with the holdings of the great royal foundation of Reading Abbey which had 228 volumes.

== Dissolution ==
Henry VIII dissolved the abbey in 1537. In 1535 the abbey's income was assessed in the Valor Ecclesiasticus, Henry VIII's great survey of church finances, at £280 gross, £249 net, so it avoided being destroyed in the first round of suppressions in 1536. However, several important courtiers, especially Thomas Wriothesley, desired to seize the abbey for themselves and put great pressure on the abbot, John Salisbury, Suffragan Bishop of Thetford to surrender on terms before he was made to by force. Abbot John bribed Wriothesley heavily to hold off, but when it was obvious to them that their abbey was doomed he and his canons took steps to secure their personal future by realising the assets for cash, including selling off the abbey's livestock, treasures and church plate. Titchfield finally fell in December 1537. The abbot proved a tough negotiator in the surrender, securing 100 marks a year as a pension for himself and comfortable incomes for his eight canons and three novices. Despite this, Abbot John remained in government favour, being made Dean of Norwich Cathedral in 1539, and later Bishop of Sodor and Man. He died in 1573.

== Place House ==
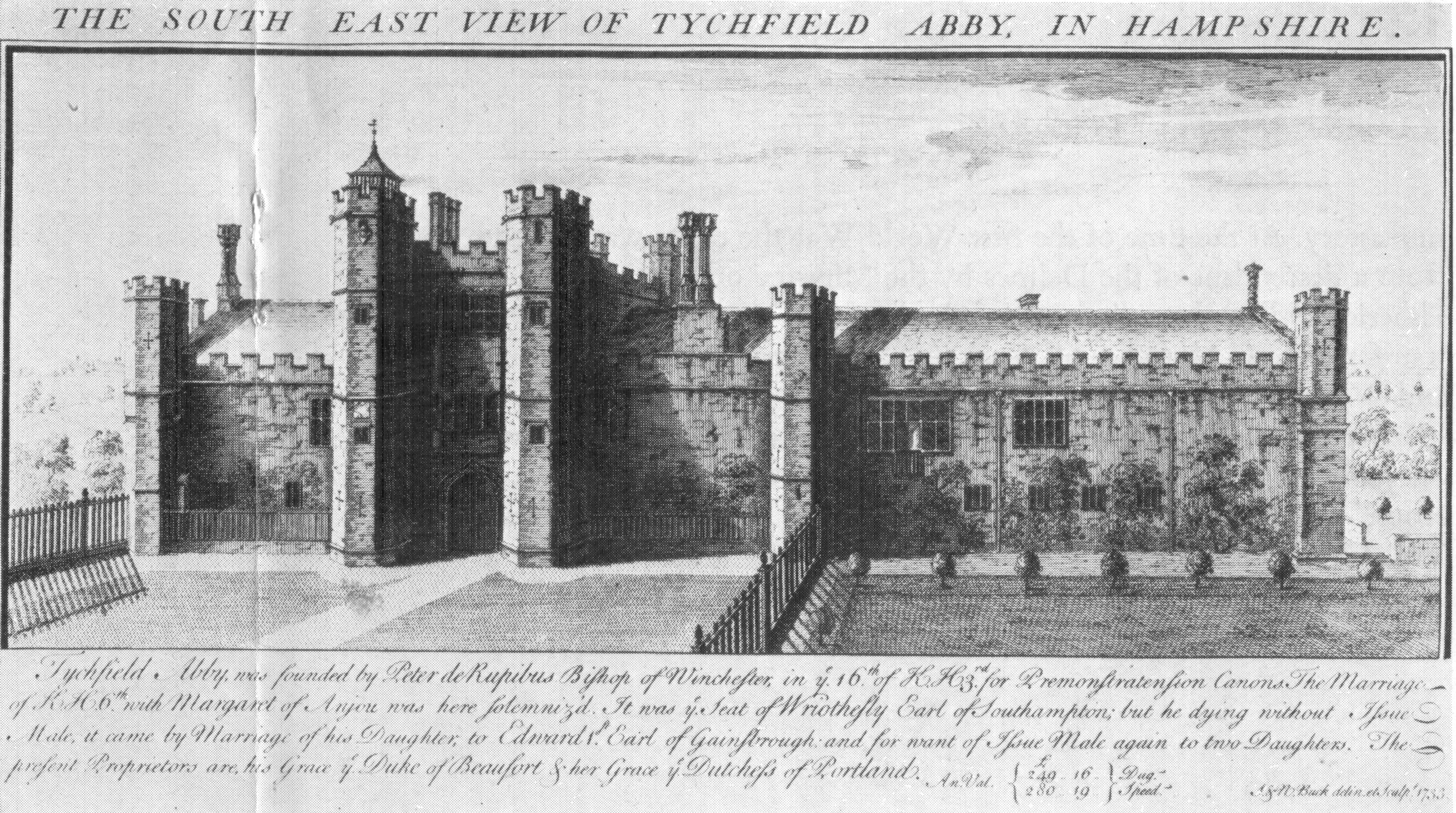
After the Dissolution the abbey was converted into a Tudor mansion called Place House. This view shows it as it looked in 1733.

Wriothesley won the battle to gain control of Titchfield and immediately began work to turn it into a mansion for himself, to be known as Place House. Within days of the departure of the canons the commissioners who had taken the surrender of Titchfield sent a report to Wriothesley detailing the state of his new property:

The church is the most naked and barren thing that ever we knew, being of such long continuance. The vestments you gave and two old chalices excepted, forty [pounds Sterling] will be the rest. At Michelmas last there were two teams of oxen and now not one ox, but a few calves and lambs, hogs of small value; certain brewing vessels, a dozen rusty platters, dishes and saucers... As for the few hangings left, we esteem them at 20 shillings...

The royal commissioners went on to note that the cost of converting the abbey into a house would be on the order of £200, but the charges on the estate from paying the pensions of the canons and the abbot would be £120 yearly. They recommended that the east end of the church and the tower be demolished during the conversion. Eleven days after the surrender of the abbey a consortium of local men led by a Mr Shelonde contracted to buy marble, altars, sculpture and other fittings from the church. It is also recorded that the tiled floors of the church were taken up and sold, however, only 10% of them were worth saving. Despite this selling-off of materials from the former abbey buildings, the bare stones left behind were vital building blocks for the new house, and Wriothesley supplemented this valuable resource with fresh Caen stone.

In contrast to the parlous state of the abbey buildings, the commissioners remarked upon the impressive series of four fishponds to the north-west of the property. These measured "a mile in length to ford and harbour" and contained an estimated 100,000 "carpes, tenches, breams and pike."

Unlike his similar project at Beaulieu Abbey, which he had also been granted by King Henry, Wriothesley chose to convert the main abbey buildings, including the church, into his house. It was an imaginative scheme, built under the direction of master mason Thomas Bartewe, a prominent contractor for King Henry's contemporary fortification works along the South Coast. He constructed a spectacular castellated gatehouse with four octagonal turrets which was forced through the middle of the nave to provide the appropriate seigneurial emphasis needed for a classic Tudor courtyard house. The cloister became the central courtyard of the house (a magnificent fountain was placed in the middle), the old refectory, with the addition of a grand porch, became the great hall, while the rest of the abbey was turned into fine apartments for the family. The church tower was initially kept as part of the house but it was soon demolished on the advice of John Crayford, one of the king's commissioners who helped to oversee the reconstruction on behalf of Wriothesley. Crayford was anxious to see the tower pulled down as, if it was left standing, the chimneys would have to be raised some twenty feet higher - and at great cost - to avoid defacing the church tower with their smoke. Other features of the mansion included a private indoor theatre and a deer park.

The resulting palatial dwelling attracted favourable notice from Wriothesley's contemporaries: in 1540, the traveller and historian John Leland noted in his Intinerary,

Mr Wriothesley hath buildid a right stately house embatelid, and having a goodeley gate and a conducte [fountain] castelid in the middle of the court of it...

Place House was considered sufficiently "embatelid" that it was regarded as a castle or fortified house, the building of which officially required a royal licence to fortify, something which Wriothesley neglected to secure. He obtained a pardon for this oversight in 1542.

As the home of an important noble, the new mansion continued to play host to important guests. Wriothesley's son, the second Earl of Southampton entertained both Edward VI and his sister Elizabeth I. Under the fourth Earl, Titchfield was host to Charles I twice, once in 1625 in company with Queen Henrietta Maria, the second time in November 1647 when the king was on the run from Parliamentary forces after having escaped from the Hampton Court. Charles II visited the next owner of the house, Edward, Earl of Gainsborough in 1675.

From the Earls of Gainsborough Titchfield passed to the Dukes of Beaufort who lived at Place House until 1741, at which point the estate was sold to the Delme family. They lived there for another forty years until, in 1781, a decision was made to abandon the mansion and deliberately demolish much of it to create a romantic ruin. When this happened local people took stone from the abbey for their homes; evidence can be seen in walls and foundations of older houses in Titchfield village. Much, though, is inside the buildings; in The Bugle Hotel in Titchfield, for example, a big fireplace was salvaged from the ruins.

== Present day ==
Though a great deal has been destroyed, there are still major remains of the abbey and Place House to be seen. In fact, the pulling down of Place House has revealed more of the abbey than would otherwise be visible. The nave of the church still stands to full height and with it Wriothesley's gatehouse. To the east of the gatehouse ruins, the barest outline of the former church can be seen, including the choir and transepts. Fragments of the cloister buildings survive, including the entrance arches to the chapter house and library in the east range. In the abbey's grounds, the fishponds have been maintained and are used regularly for fishing. In addition, to the west of the abbey, and outside of the wall ringing the English Heritage site, there is a fragment of an outlying abbey building, the use of which is not recorded.

Substantial stretches of the late mediaeval tile floors survive to this day. An inscription which used to lie before the entrance to the canons' refectory, was later covered and preserved beneath the steps leading up to Wriothesley's banqueting hall. Two other patches of tiling survive to the north of the gatehouse. Following the expulsion of the canons, these were concealed beneath the spiral staircases installed in Wriothesley's reconstruction, and therefore escaped being torn out with the rest of the tiles along the cloister walk. In winter, the tiles are covered over with sand by English Heritage staff in order to protect them from damage in the cold weather.

The abbey has been the setting for concerts, including folk and blues festivals and open-air theatre and is now under the care of English Heritage. It is open to the public.

== See also ==
- Peter des Roches
- Beaulieu Abbey
- Halesowen Abbey
