= Thomas Stevens (monk) =

English Cistercian monk and clergyman

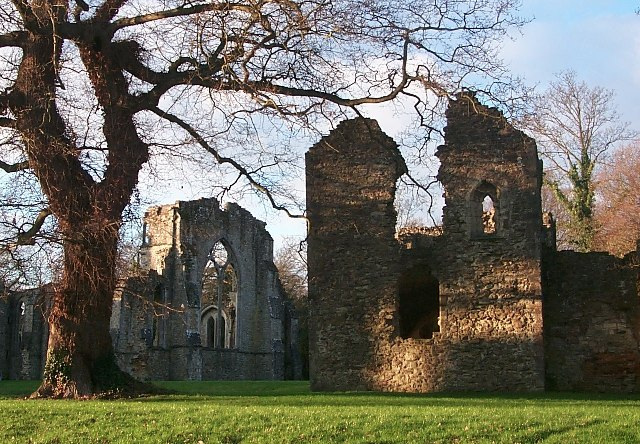
The abbot's two-storey vaulted house (right) at Netley Abbey was Steven' lodging in 1529-1536.

Thomas Stevens (or Stephens), Abbot of Netley Abbey and later of Beaulieu Abbey; (b. probably. c. 1490) (died 1550) was an English and Cistercian monk and clergyman. As abbot of Netley and later of Beaulieu he had the right to a seat in the House of Lords.

Little is known of Stevens' early life, but at some time in the late fifteenth or early sixteenth century he became a monk at the small and poor Cistercian monastery of Netley Abbey in Hampshire. There he took holy orders and rose through the ranks so that by 1529 he was elected abbot of Netley, succeeding John Corne.

== Abbot ==
Stevens was evidently a skilled administrator and agriculturalist. Under his stewardship his often financially troubled abbey of Netley remained solvent (a difficult task given the small endowment and the heavy cost of providing hospitality to travellers by land and sea and the king’s sailors) and he was able to build up a farm surplus worth more than £100, a sum not far off the annual net income of the abbey, and to pay down the debts. The amount of £100 was considerable for this period. He also maintained high standards of religious life at the abbey, and he and his seven monks were the object of good reports to the king from the local gentry and were much respected in the neighbourhood. That the Abbot was also trusted by the government, is shown by his being given custody of two Franciscan friars, who presumably had offended the king by opposing his religious policies.

Notwithstanding the Abbot's apparent complacency, those policies were soon to have a dramatic effect on his own life. In 1535 Netley's income was assessed in the Valor Ecclesiasticus, Henry VIII's general survey of church finances, at £160 gross, £100 net, which meant the following year that it came under the terms of the first Suppression Act, Henry's initial move in the Dissolution of the monasteries, which closed all monasteries with incomes of less than £200 per year. Abbot Stevens and his seven monks were forced to surrender their house to the King in 1536.

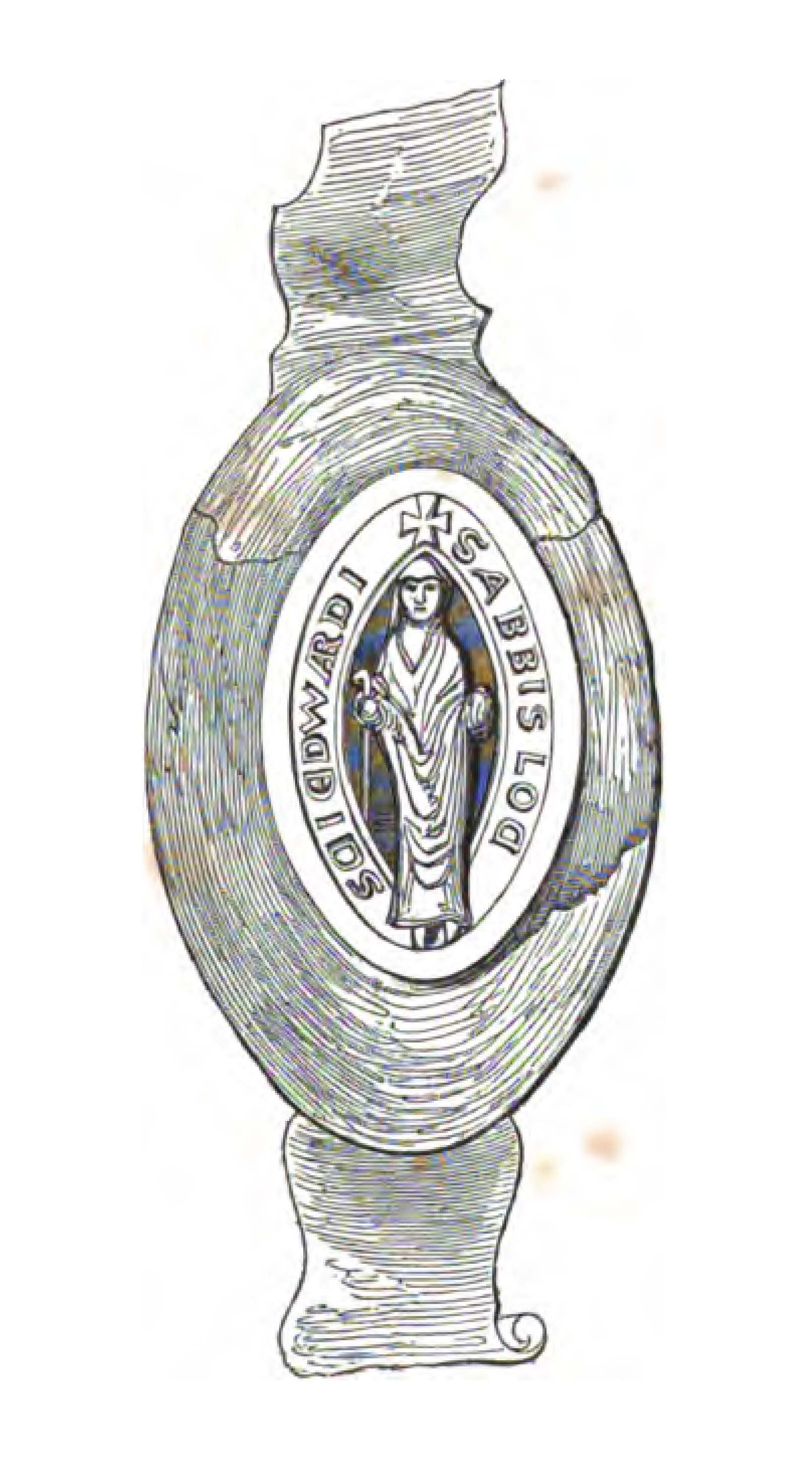
The seal of the abbots of Netley. Thomas Stevens would have used this to authenticate official documents as abbot.

Yet this was not the end of Thomas' career as an abbot. In fact, shortly before the closure of Netley, Henry appointed him abbot of Netley's mother house, Beaulieu Abbey, a wealthy royal foundation across Southampton Water. This was unusual, and is symptomatic of the general breakdown, since the post was elective. Thomas and six of his monks (the other desired to resign and become a secular priest) crossed Southampton Water to join Beaulieu in 1536. At Beaulieu Stevens continued the policy he had presumably already begun of currying favour with the government, especially Thomas Cromwell, King Henry's chief minister, who held the fates of the English clergy in his hands, as well as bribing Thomas Wriothesley, 1st Earl of Southampton, another minister who had his eyes on taking over the abbey for himself, with the fine horses from the abbey stables. Now the currying aimed ostensibly at saving Beaulieu.

However, there came a setback. Stevens had barely been abbot of Beaulieu for a year when a crisis occurred which enabled the government to put pressure on him to surrender his monastery, were this needed, and perhaps to menace a worse fate. In September 1537 James Manzi (or Mangii), a Florentine on the run from the government for unspecified offences that might be construed as treason, took sanctuary at the abbey. Cromwell sent agents to arrest him, but the abbot was absent when they arrived and in the meanwhile the fugitive escaped. The abbot conducted an investigation into the affair and Manzi was soon recaptured, but suspicion remained that he had been somehow involved in the escape in the spirit of the old laws of the sanctuary (thus potentially incurring serious criminal charges) and Stevens was obliged to throw himself on the mercy of Cromwell and Wriothesley.

Since by early 1538 it was clear that Beaulieu was doomed, the abbot began to make provision for his future. One of his last acts as abbot before he was finally forced to surrender was to grant the mill and parsonage of Beaulieu to a friend and give his sister a manor house belonging to the abbey, conduct not a uncommon practice among heads of institutions suppression by Henry's government, as insurance against not getting a decent pension (compare the similar transactions at neighbouring Titchfield Abbey). The king’s commissioners arrived at the gates of the abbey in March 1538 and, after negotiations, the great monastery surrendered on 2 April 1538, the deed being signed by Thomas and 20 of the monks. It is probable that by now Stevens had had a change of mentality, after all his attachment to Beaulieu was not that of a lifetime, and his appointment there, despite the tensions, had been something of a windfall. Now he was destined to receive a handsome pension of 100 marks a year for a largely ceremonial role in an event he could do nothing to prevent. It made him a wealthy man, and made him disinclined to any great fellow-feeling for his fellow monks. In a letter to Thomas Wriothesley written shortly after the abbey was extinguished, he fell to describing his monks at Beaulieu as "lewd monks, which now, I thank God, I am rid of". On the other hand, he displayed more apparent sympathy for the people who had taken sanctuary at the abbey and who lived in the abbey grounds. He pleaded with the government for their lives, with the result that they were given either pardons or protection and the right to remain living in the former abbey precinct.

== Later life ==
Thomas continued his career in the church after the fall of Beaulieu and already in 1539 was made rector of Bentworth in Hampshire. In May 1548 he was also made Treasurer of Salisbury Cathedral and given the prebend of Calne while retaining his rectory. Since he could only be in one place at a time, somewhere he was an absentee incumbent. The appointment under the Protestantising Edward VI suggests that Stevens was now of flexible theological views. At some point he married, too, and had children, who are mentioned in his will.

Stevens' will, which he wrote on 9 August 1550, perhaps already in bad health, and its codicil, written three days later, reveals more details about Thomas' subsequent life. At that date he had a daughter, Mary Stevens, to whom he left all his property, specifically noting his plate and an estate he had recently bought at Alton. Mary was clearly young because he created a trust supervised by a friend, Christofer Wallison, to manage the property and help her make a suitable marriage. Mary was present at the creation of the will and agreed not to marry anyone without the consent of Christofer. At his death Thomas was a rich man, which can be seen from the large sums he was able to leave as gifts to friends and his servants, many of whom are named in the will. It was a long way from the poor Cistercian monk of Netley.

He must have died shortly after making his will, which was probated by the Archbishop of Canterbury in London on 9 September 1550.

== See also ==
- Netley Abbey
- Beaulieu Abbey
- Salisbury Cathedral

== Bibliography ==
- Page, William; Doubleday, H. Arthur (1973a), "Houses of Cistercian monks: Abbey of Beaulieu", A History of the County of Hampshire: Volume II, The Victoria County History, pp. 140–146, ISBN 0-7129-0592-8
- Page, William; Doubleday, H. Arthur (1973b), "Houses of Cistercian monks: Abbey of Netley", A History of the County of Hampshire: Volume II, The Victoria County History, pp. 146–149, ISBN 0-7129-0592-8
- Heale, Martin (2016), The Abbots and Priors of Late Medieval and Reformation England, Oxford University Press
- Hockey, Dom Frederick (1976), Beaulieu, King John's Abbey A history of Beaulieu Abbey Hampshire 1204-1538, Pioneer Publications, ISBN 0-9502786-1-0
- Horn, Joyce (1973), Fasti Ecclesiae Anglicanae 1541-1857: Volume VI: Salisbury Diocese, University of London, Institute of Historical Research, ISBN 0-901179-91-4
- Knowles, Dom. David (1959), Bare Ruined Choirs, Cambridge University Press, ISBN 0-521-09930-7
