= Beaulieu Abbey =

Medieval Cistercian abbey in England

Coordinates: 50.82164°N 1.44913°W

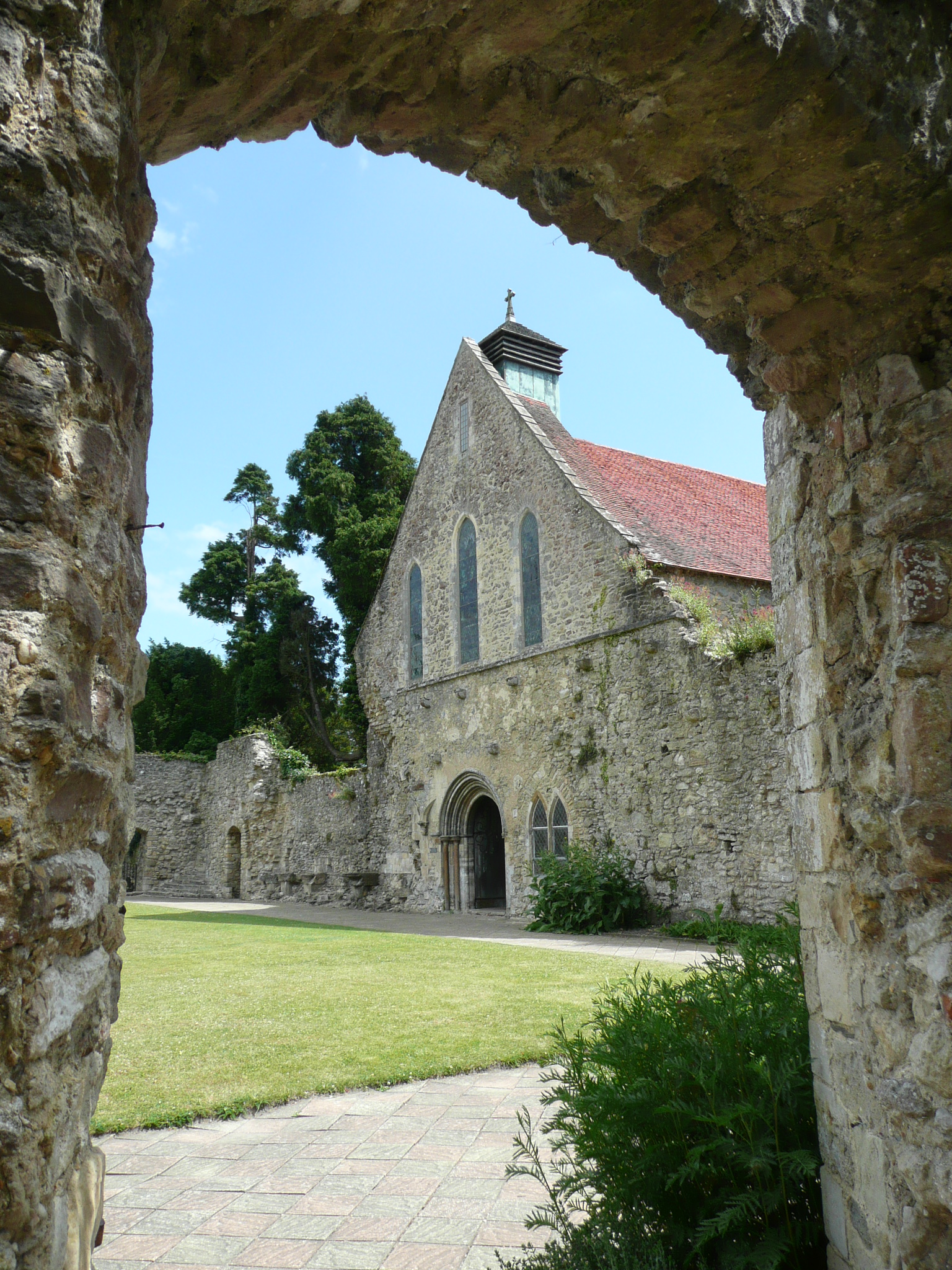
- The cloister and refectory of Beaulieu Abbey seen from the west range
- Interactive map of Beaulieu Abbey

Monastery information
- Full name: The Abbey Church of St Mary, Bellus Locus Regis (Latin: "The beautiful place of the king")
- Other name: Beaulieu Abbey
- Order: Cistercian
- Established: 1203/1204
- Disestablished: 1538
- Mother house: Cîteaux Abbey, France
- Dedication: Virgin Mary
- Diocese: Winchester
- Controlled churches: Shilton, Inglesham, Coxwell, St Keverne

People
- Founder: King John
- Important associated figures: King John, Thomas Wriothesley, 1st Earl of Southampton, Abbot Thomas Stevens

Site
- Location: Beaulieu, Hampshire, England
- Visible remains: cloister, refectory (now the parish church) and west range, gatehouse, foundations of the church, many other ruins, earthworks
- Public access: yes

Beaulieu Abbey (/ˈbjuːli/ BEW-lee) was a Cistercian abbey in Hampshire, England. It was founded in 1203–1204 by King John and (uniquely in Britain) populated by 30 monks sent from the abbey of Cîteaux in France, the mother house of the Cistercian order. The Medieval Latin name of the monastery was Bellus Locus Regis ("The beautiful place of the king"') or monasterium Belli loci Regis. Other spellings of the English name which occur historically are Bewley (16th century) and Beaulie (17th century).

== History ==
=== Foundation ===
The first Abbot of Beaulieu was Hugh, who stood high in the king's favour, often served in important diplomatic missions and was later to become Bishop of Carlisle. The king granted the new abbey a rich endowment, including numerous manors spread across southern England (particularly in Berkshire), land in the New Forest, corn, large amounts of money, building materials, 120 cows, 12 bulls, a golden chalice, and an annual tun of wine. John's son and successor, King Henry III was equally generous to Beaulieu, with the result that the abbey became very wealthy, though it was far from the richest English Cistercian house.

Monks from Beaulieu founded four daughter houses, Netley Abbey in Hampshire (1239), Hailes Abbey in Gloucestershire (1246), Newenham Abbey in Devon (1247) and St Mary Graces Abbey in London (1350).

=== Buildings ===
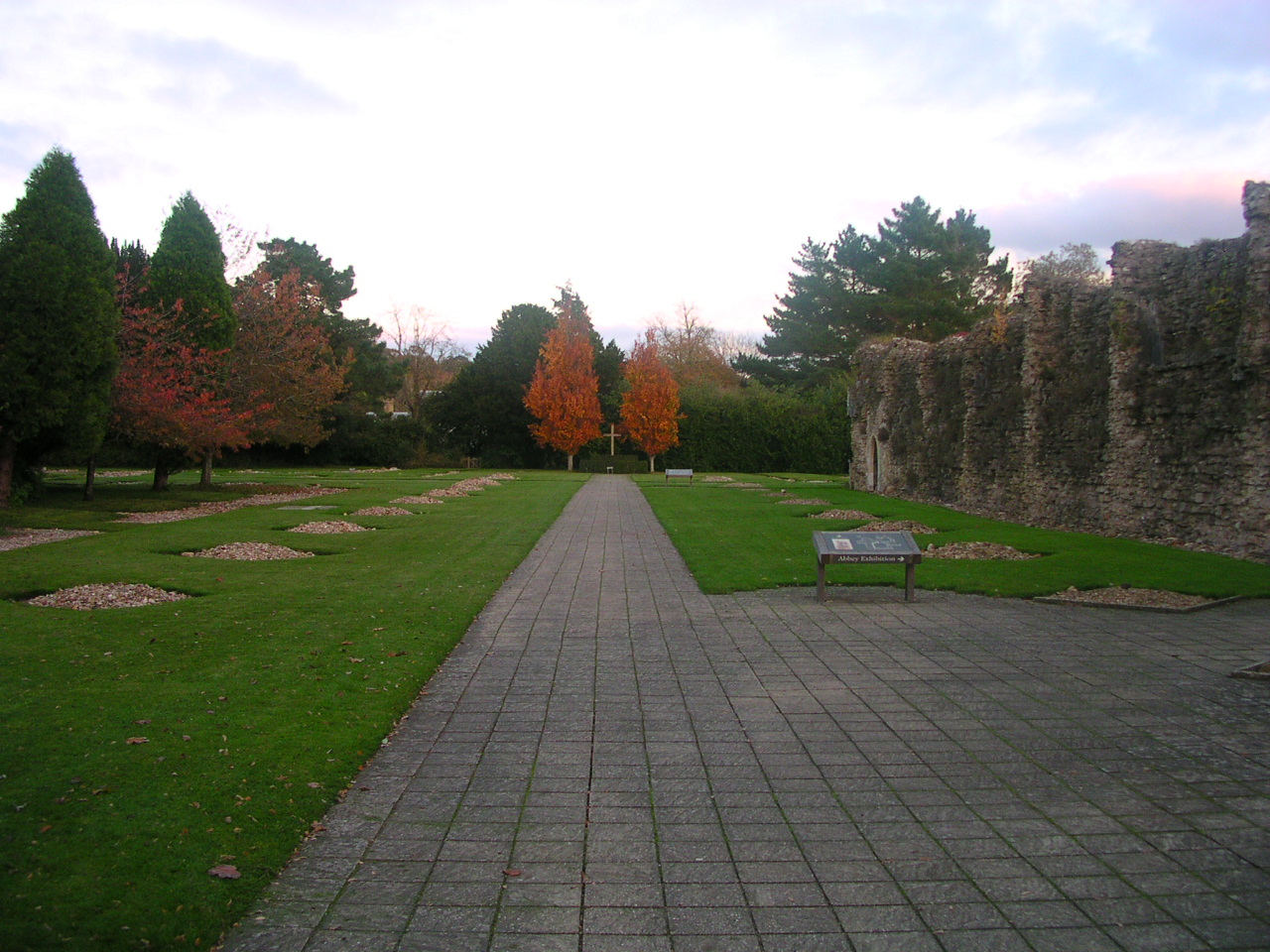
The surviving wall and marked out foundations of the abbey church.

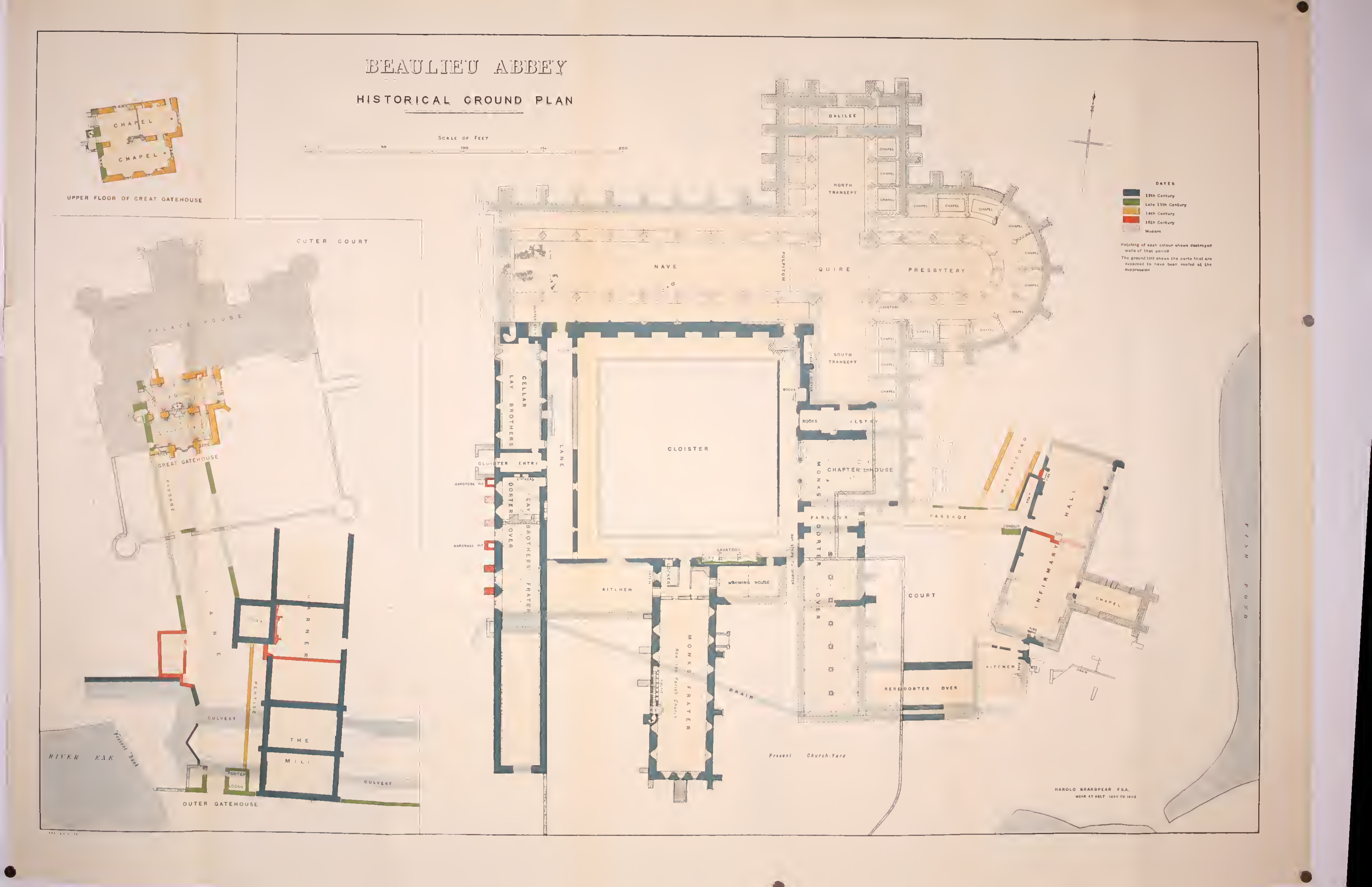
Historical ground plan of the abbey, from the description by Hope and Brakspear (1906)

The abbey's buildings were of a scale and magnificence reflecting its status as an important royal foundation. The church was a vast cruciform structure in early gothic style and heavily influenced by French churches of the order, especially those of Cîteaux, Bonport and Clairvaux. The church was 102-metre (335 ft) long and had a semi-circular apse with 11 radiating chapels. The building took more than four decades to complete and was finally dedicated in 1246, in the presence of King Henry III and his queen, of Richard, Earl of Cornwall, and of many prelates and nobles.

South of the church stood a cloister, ranged around which were the chapter house, refectory, kitchens, storehouse and quarters for the monks, lay brothers and the abbot. A separate infirmary complex lay to the east of the main buildings, connected to them by a passage. The abbey was surrounded by workshops, farm buildings, guesthouses, a mill, and extensive gardens and fishponds. Strongly fortified gatehouses controlled entry to the monastic enclosure, which was defended by a wall. A water gate allowed access to ships in the river.

=== Exemption and sanctuary ===
Pope Innocent III constituted Beaulieu an "exempt abbey", meaning that the abbot had to answer to no local bishop but only to the Pope himself. Beaulieu was also invested by the same Pope with special privileges of sanctuary, much stronger than usual and covering not only the abbey itself but all the 23.5 hectare precinct around as included in the original grant made by King John. As Beaulieu was the only abbey in its region with such large and strongly enforced sanctuary rights, it soon became a refuge for fugitives, both ordinary criminals and debtors and also political enemies of the government. Among these latter were Anne Neville, wife of Warwick the Kingmaker, who sought sanctuary after the Battle of Barnet (1471). Twenty-six years later, Perkin Warbeck fled to Beaulieu from the pursuing armies of Henry VII.

=== Dissolution ===
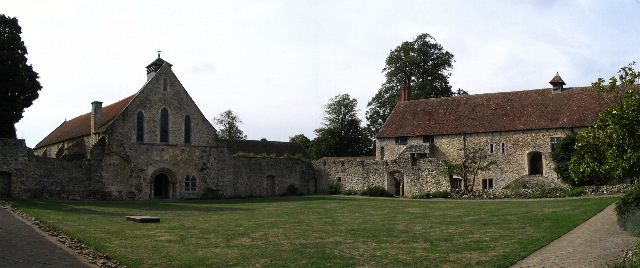
The cloister at Beaulieu Abbey seen from the door to the church. On the left can be seen the refectory – now the parish church of Beaulieu – on the right the west range, home of the abbey's lay brothers.

In 1535 the abbey's income was assessed in the Valor Ecclesiasticus, Henry VIII's general survey of church finances prior to the expropriation, at £428 gross, £326 net. According to the terms of the first Suppression Act, Henry's initial move in the Dissolution of the Monasteries, this meant that it escaped immediate confiscation, though the clouds were gathering.

The last abbot of Beaulieu was Abbot Thomas Stevens, elected in 1536, who had formerly been abbot of the recently dissolved abbey of Netley, across Southampton Water. Though Beaulieu managed to survive until April 1538, at that point it was finally forced to surrender to the government. Many of the monks were granted pensions, the abbot receiving 100 marks per year. Abbot Thomas ended his days as treasurer of Salisbury Cathedral. He died in 1550.

At the dissolution of the monastery in 1538, the Commissioners for the Dissolution reported to the government that thirty-two sanctuary-men, who were here for debt, felony, or murder, were living in houses in the monastic precincts with their wives and families. When the abbey was dissolved there was some debate about what to do with them, however, in the end it was decided, after pleading by the former abbot and certain government officials, to allow the debtors to live in their houses on the abbey grounds permanently. Pardons were given to some of the criminals too, including one Thomas Jeynes, a murderer.

== Country mansion ==
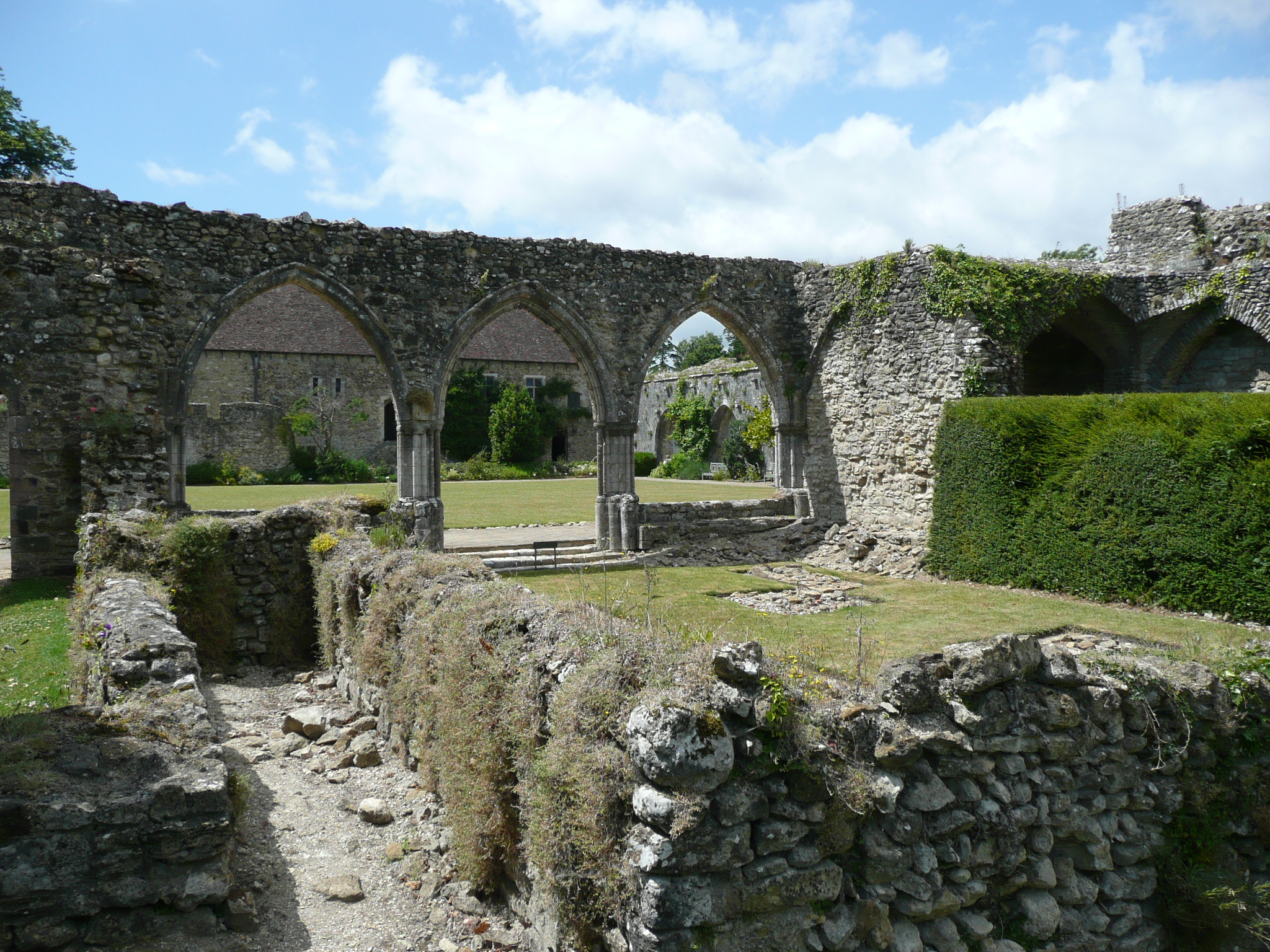
The interior of the chapter house of Beaulieu Abbey.

After Beaulieu fell there was much competition amongst courtiers to gain ownership of the abbey and its valuable estates, but eventually Thomas Wriothesley, 1st Earl of Southampton, won the struggle and King Henry granted him the abbey itself and 3,441 hectares of the Beaulieu lands.

As soon as he took over, Wriothesley set about building himself a house on the site. He demolished the church, as was common practice but, unusually, instead of converting the buildings around the cloister into a home he chose the great gatehouse as the core of his mansion (compare Wriothesley's other converted monastery at Titchfield Abbey or the conversion of neighbouring Netley Abbey). This survives – much extended – as the modern country house at Beaulieu known as Palace House. Lord Southampton preserved the monks' refectory, which he gave to the people of Beaulieu village to be their parish church, a function it still serves today. The west range of the abbey, known as the Domus, was also saved. The rest of the abbey was allowed to fall into ruin.

== Today ==
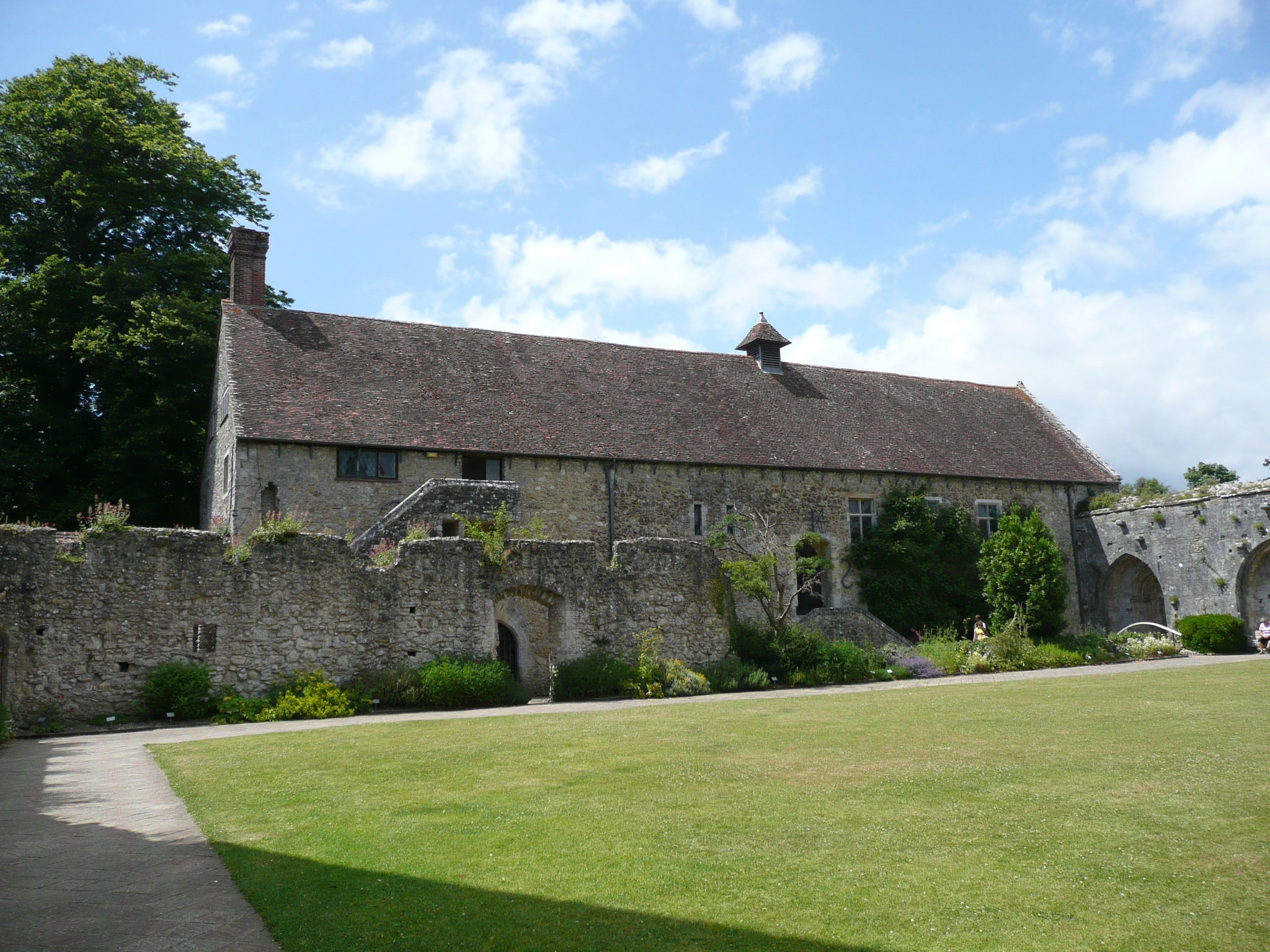
The Domus, or lay-brothers' living quarters, now a museum

Although a great deal was destroyed at the time of the Dissolution of the Monasteries, there is still much to see. The layout of the 102-metre-long church can be seen on the lawns. The position of the altar is marked by a cross and flanking trees. The south wall of the nave, where the cloister leant against it, still stands. At each end is a fine processional door between the church and the cloister. The cloister arcades themselves have vanished, but the open space is still enclosed by walls and planted with fragrant herbs. To the east lay the sacristy, the chapter house, the slype or passage to the infirmary, and the monks' day room. Of these the main survival is the façade of the chapter house, with three large Gothic arches. The dormitory that stood above these rooms has vanished, as has most of the reredorter extending east from its southern end. The south range contained the warming room, the refectory (aligned north-south in the Cistercian manner) and the kitchen. The warming room and the kitchen have largely disappeared, but the refectory survives as the parish church. It is a fine 13th-century building, with elaborate shafted lancet windows and an intact reader's pulpit, for reading biblical passages at mealtimes. Between the east and south ranges, the lower part of the dormitory staircase can be seen. The west range, now called the Domus, was initially the lay brothers' refectory and dormitory and, later, chambers for important guests once the lay brothers had vanished. It is separated from the main cloister by a 'lane', to segregate the monks from the lay brothers. It now houses an exhibition of monastic life prior to Thomas Wriothesley's takeover. Visitors can view a series of modern embroidered wall hangings made by Belinda, Lady Montagu, depicting scenes from medieval monastic life and the history of the abbey since 1204. Beyond the central claustral buildings, foundations remain of the infirmary. The abbey stood within two walled courtyards, of which much of the precinct walls still stand. The smaller outer gatehouse is still used as such, while the inner gatehouse has been greatly altered for use as Beaulieu Palace House. Although the passage has been blocked up at each end, the tierceron vaulting remains inside. Beaulieu remains in the hands of the descendants of Wriothesley, who still live there.

The Abbey is open to the public as part of the visitor attraction known as "Beaulieu", which includes:

- Beaulieu Abbey
- National Motor Museum
- Beaulieu Palace House
- Secret Army Exhibition – an exhibit about the Special Operations Executive training at Beaulieu during World War II
- Gardens
- A monorail
- Rides

The Domus is regularly used for events, dining and corporate hospitality.

== Folklore ==
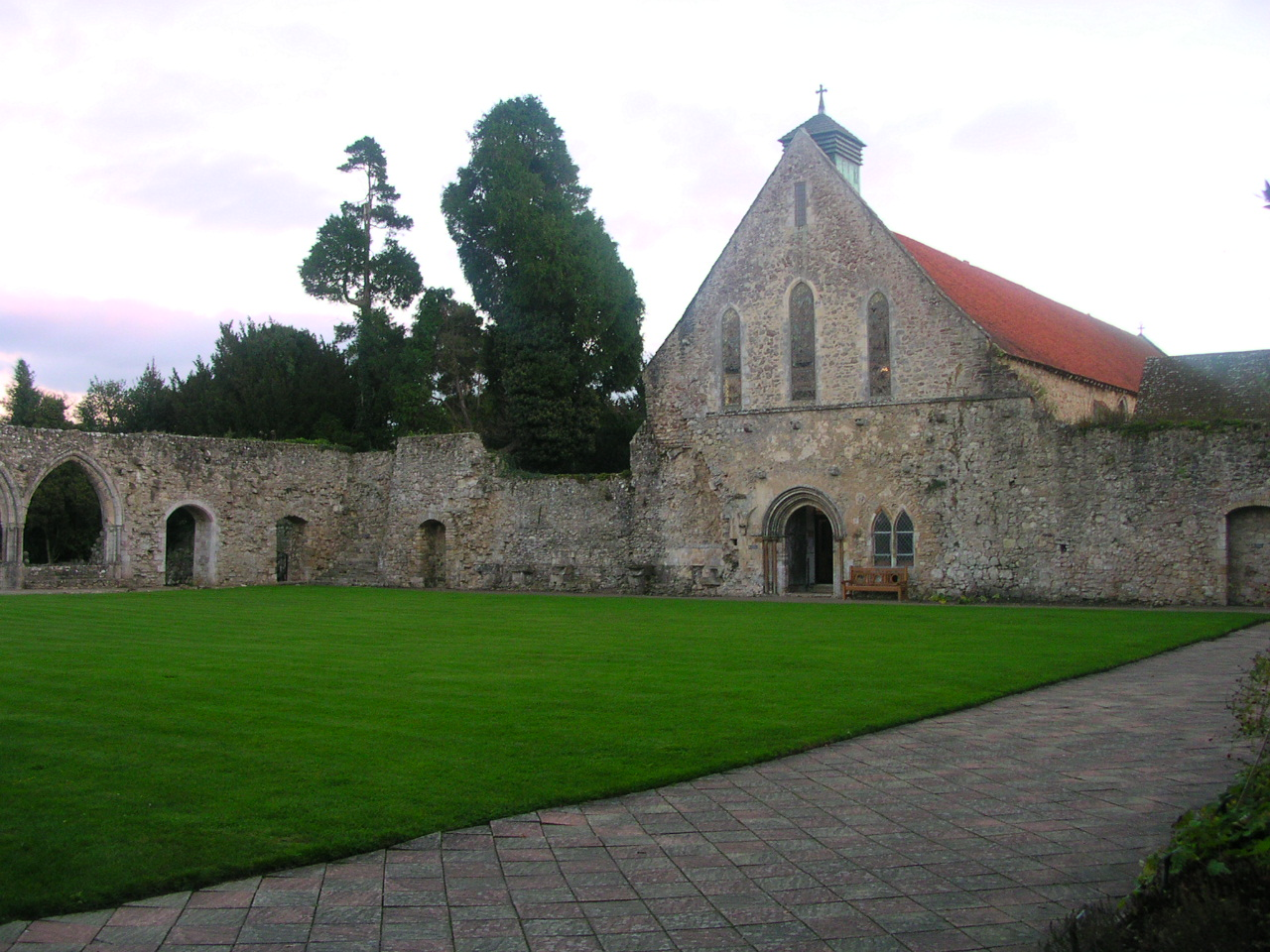
The cloister and the refectory

=== Foundation legend ===
Beaulieu Abbey was the sole religious foundation of King John. The legend of this event, first told in a Kirkstall chartulary, is related by the antiquarian William Dugdale, who incorrectly suggested that "King John being offended with the Cistercian order in England, and the Abbots of that Order coming to him to reconcile themselves, he caused them to be trod under his Horses Feet, for which Action being terrified in a Dream, he built and bestowed the Abby of Beau-lieu in Newforest for 30 monks of that order." The legend was repeated in a later work by the topographer Thomas Cox. Modern re-tellings of the king's "babbling dream" state that he dreamed of being scourged with rods and thongs by the abbots he had commanded be trampled and he awoke to find his body still ached from the blows in his dream. The king is said to have taken great interest in the construction of the abbey and even to have expressed a desire to be entombed beneath the high altar.

=== Reported hauntings ===
Beaulieu, according to the official website, is one of the most haunted places in Britain, with reported sightings going back over a hundred years.

The sound of Gregorian chant, considered an omen by local tradition, have been reported by Mrs Elizabeth Varley, daughter of John Douglas-Scott-Montagu, 2nd Baron Montagu of Beaulieu, and Michael C. Sedgwick, former curator of the National Motor Museum, amongst others.

Among the many reported sightings of monks (allegedly white and brown clad) in the abbey ruins and in the parish church, including one by the actress Margaret Rutherford, is an often repeated tale involving a group of local boys sheltering from a storm in a disused boathouse who see a rowing boat making for the shore.

The eccentric Reverend Robert Frazer Powles, Vicar of Beaulieu (1886–1939), claimed to have gone so far as to converse with ghostly monks whom he knew by name, and even to have celebrated candlelit midnight mass every Christmas Eve for them.

== In culture ==
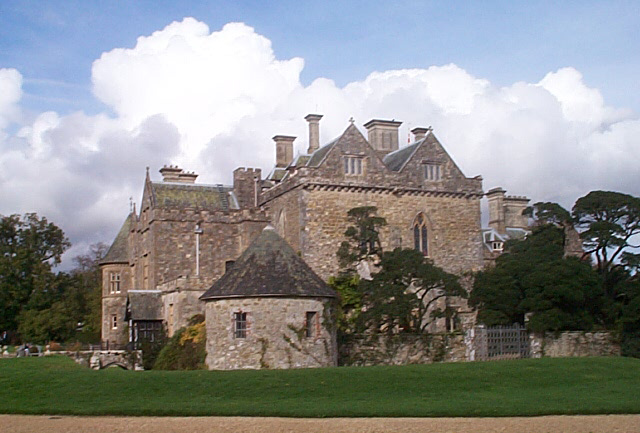
The post-Dissolution mansion at Beaulieu, known as Palace House, was built around the medieval gatehouse of the abbey (the double gabled building in the centre-right of the picture).

Beaulieu Abbey is the setting of the opening chapters in Sir Arthur Conan Doyle's historical novel The White Company. F. T. Prince's poem "At Beaulieu"', from his 1963 collection, The Doors of Stone, describes the double heart-coffin on display in the Abbey. Prince, who was Professor of English at the University of Southampton from 1957 to 1974, probably visited the site sometime in the late 1950s/early 1960s. Sir John Betjeman's poem "Youth and Age on Beaulieu River" is based on a visit he made to the New Forest. Beaulieu Abbey plays a prominent role in Edward Rutherfurd's novel The Forest.

== Burials at the abbey ==
- Isabel Marshal
- Thomas Skevington

== See also ==
- Great Coxwell Barn
- Titchfield Abbey
- Baron Montagu of Beaulieu
- List of English abbeys, priories and friaries serving as parish churches
