= Netley Abbey =

Ruins of 13th-century abbey in Hampshire, England

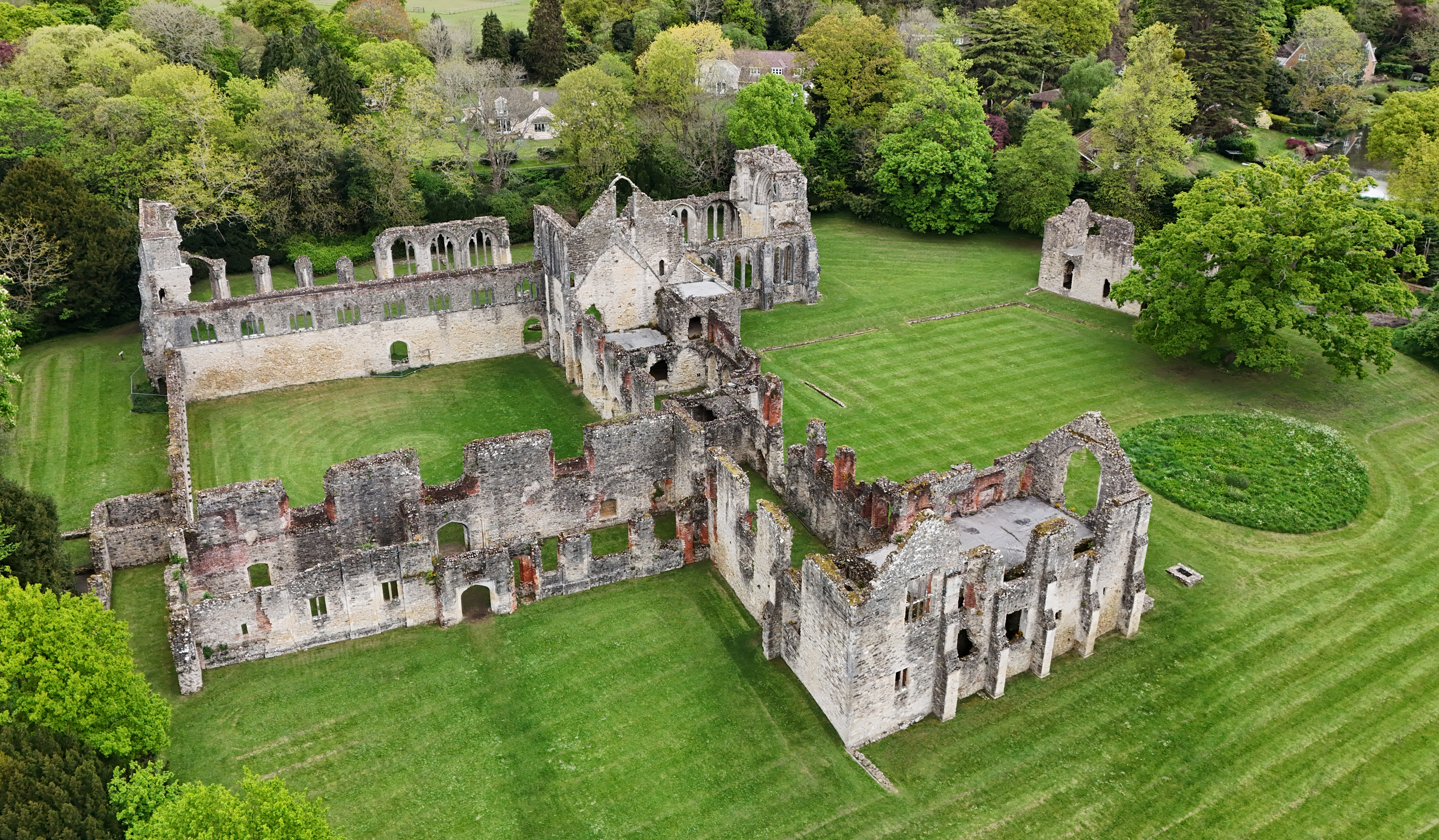
- Ruins of Netley Abbey
- Interactive map of Netley Abbey

Monastery information
- Full name: The Abbey Church of St Mary of Edwardstow (Sanctae Mariae de Loco Sancti Edwardi)
- Other names: Latin: Laetus Locus (Happy Place), Lieu-Saint-Edward, Letley
- Order: Cistercians
- Established: 1239
- Disestablished: 1536/7
- Mother house: Beaulieu Abbey
- Dedication: Virgin Mary and Edward the Confessor
- Diocese: Diocese of Winchester

People
- Founders: Peter des Roches and Henry III
- Important associated figures: William Paulet, Abbot Thomas Stevens

Site
- Location: Netley, Hampshire, United Kingdom
- Grid reference: SU453090
- Visible remains: major ruins of church, monastic buildings and post-Dissolution mansion
- Public access: open to the public (English Heritage)

Netley Abbey is a ruined late medieval monastery in the village of Netley near Southampton in Hampshire, England. The abbey was founded in 1239 as a house for monks of the austere Cistercian order. Despite royal patronage, Netley was never rich, produced no influential scholars nor churchmen, and its nearly 300-year history was quiet. The monks were best known to their neighbours for the generous hospitality they offered to travellers on land and sea.

In 1536, Netley Abbey was seized by Henry VIII of England during the Dissolution of the Monasteries and the buildings granted to William Paulet, a wealthy Tudor politician, who converted them into a mansion. The abbey was used as a country house until the beginning of the eighteenth century, after which it was abandoned and partially demolished for building materials. Subsequently the ruins became a tourist attraction, and provided inspiration to poets and artists of the Romantic movement. In the early twentieth century the site was given to the nation, and it is now a Scheduled Ancient Monument, cared for by English Heritage. The extensive remains consist of the church, cloister buildings, abbot's house, and fragments of the post-Dissolution mansion. Netley Abbey is one of the best preserved medieval Cistercian monasteries in southern England.

== Foundation ==
Netley was conceived by the influential Peter des Roches, who was Bishop of Winchester from 1205 until his death in 1238; the abbey was founded shortly after his death, in 1239. The founder's charter shows the name of the abbey as "the church of St Mary of Edwardstow", or the Latin "Ecclesia Sanctae Mariae de loco Sancti Edwardi" although the title of the charter calls it "Letley"; the present name of Netley is most likely derived from this. The abbey was one of a pair of monasteries which the bishop intended as a memorial to himself; the other is La Clarté-Dieu in Saint-Paterne-Racan, France. Des Roches began to purchase the lands for Netley's initial endowment in about 1236, but he died before the project was finished and the foundation was completed by his executors. According to the Chronicle of Waverley Abbey, the first monks arrived to settle the site on 25 July 1239 from neighbouring Beaulieu Abbey, a year after the bishop's death. The fact of its founder prior death before designation of the endowment was complete, put the incipient abbey in a difficult financial situation. It is thought that only after the house was taken under the wing of Henry III, who became interested in it in the mid-1240s, was progress made on the buildings. The King eventually assumed the role of patron in 1251.

== Buildings ==
=== Church ===
The fruits of royal patronage were demonstrated by the construction of a large church (72 metres (236 ft) long), built in the fashionable French-influenced Gothic style pioneered by Henry's masons at Westminster Abbey. The high quality and elaborate nature of the church's decoration, particularly its mouldings and tracery, indicate how the machine of royal patronage lead to a move away from the deliberate austerity of the early Cistercian churches towards the grandeur then considered appropriate to a secular church such as a cathedral. Construction of the church proceeded from east to west. The sanctuary and transepts were built first to allow the monks to hold services, and the nave was completed over time. It is not known precisely when the building work began, but major gifts by King Henry of roofing timber and lead from Derbyshire in 1251 and 1252 indicate that some of the eastern parts of the church, and probably of the east cloister range too, had by then reached an advanced stage. The presence of a foundation stone at the base of the southeast pier of the crossing inscribed "H. DI. GRA REX ANGE" (Latin for Henry by the Grace of God King of the English) shows that the foundations of the centre of the church reached ground level after 1251, the year Henry III formally became the abbey's patron. Taking many decades to complete, the church was probably finished between 1290 and 1320. Dating the various parts of the building relies predominantly on stylistic criteria.

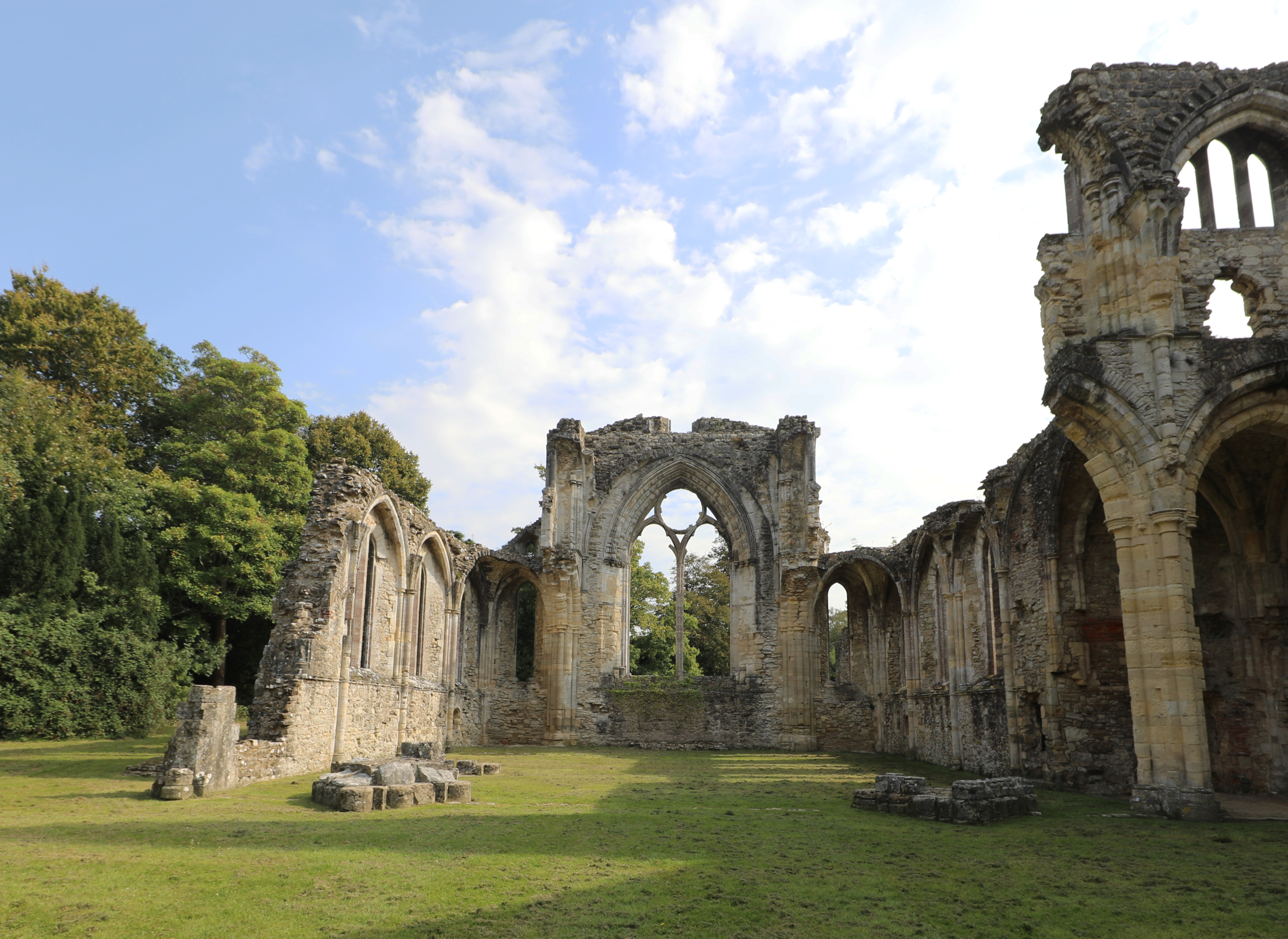
The east window of the church

The church was cruciform in shape, with vaulting and a square sanctuary and a low central tower containing bells. It was aisled throughout, with a pair of chapels on the east side of each transept. There was no triforium, but a narrow gallery surmounted by a clerestory of triple lancet windows ran above each bay of the arcade, as can be seen in the surviving section in the south transept. The vaulting sprang directly from the top of the arcade. The wall at the eastern end of the sanctuary, probably built after 1260, had a large window which features an upper rose and elaborate tracery; the aisle windows were simple paired lancets recessed within an arch. In the nave, the south aisle had plain triple lancets set high in the wall to avoid the cloister roof. The north aisle windows by contrast had richly decorated cusped tracery, reflecting the changes in taste over the long period of construction, and suggesting that this was among the last parts of the church to be finished, probably in the very late thirteenth or early fourteenth centuries. The west wall of the church also has a large window, the tracery of which was destroyed in a collapse during the eighteenth century. Surviving fragments show that it was built in a "freer and more advanced style" than other parts of the church, and suggest a date around the turn of the fourteenth century.

Internally, the church was subdivided into several areas. The high altar was against the east wall of the sanctuary, flanked by two smaller altars on the side walls. To the west, under the tower, were the monks' choir stalls where they sat during services, and further west was a pulpitum or rood screen, which blocked access to the ritual areas of the church. In the nave, the lay brothers had their own choir stalls and altar for services. The monks of Netley kept up a schedule of services and prayer both day and night following the traditional canonical hours; a staircase in the south transept went up to the monks' dormitory, allowing them to convenient access to the night services. The lay brothers had their own entrance to the church at the west end via a covered gallery from their accommodation.

Unlike other orders of monks who allowed parishioners and visitors admission to the nave, the Cistercians officially reserved their churches solely for the use of the monastic community. Others had to worship in a separate chapel in the abbey grounds close to the main gate. Over time this rule was relaxed to allow pilgrims to visit shrines, as at Hailes Abbey with its relic of the Holy Blood, and to allow the construction of tombs and chantries for patrons and wealthy benefactors of the house, as in the churches of other orders. Excavated sculpture shows that the church at Netley featured a number of elaborate tombs and monuments.

The interior of the church was richly decorated. The walls were plastered and painted in white and maroon with geometric patterns and lines designed to give the impression of ashlar masonry. Architectural detail was also picked out in maroon. The floors were covered in polychrome encaustic tiles featuring foliage, heraldic beasts, and coats of arms including those of England, France, the Holy Roman Empire, Queen Eleanor of Castile, Richard of Cornwall and many powerful noble families. The chapels in the south transept had tiles with symbols of Edward the Confessor and the Virgin Mary. The windows of the church were filled with painted glass, six panels of which have been recovered. They show scenes from the life of the Virgin Mary, the Crucifixion, monks, monsters and humorous animals.

=== Cloister and east range ===
South of the church stands a cloister surrounded by ranges of buildings on three sides, the church forming the fourth. As is known, the cloister was the heart of the abbey, where the monks spent most of their time when not in church, engaged in study, copying books and the creation of illuminated manuscripts. The monks' desks were placed in the north walk of the cloister, and a cupboard for books in current use was carved into the external wall of the south transept.

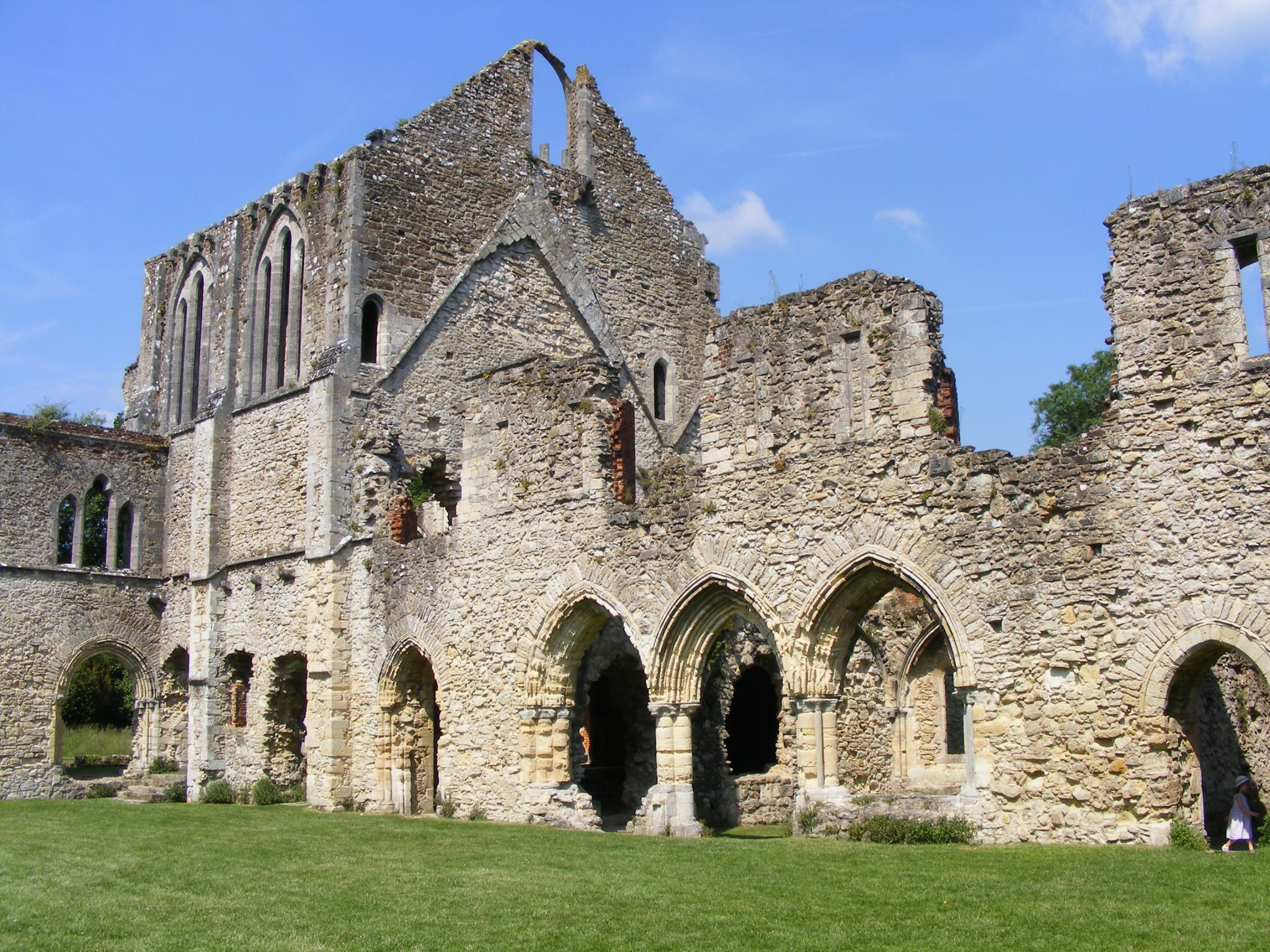
The cloister showing the south transept of the church and the east range. The triple arches in the centre formed the entrance to the chapter house. The two second floor windows, with three tall lights each, are partially modern reconstructions.

The east range, which was started at the same time as the church and probably took about 10 years to build, contained many of the abbey's most important rooms. The vaulted library and sacristy were on the ground floor, adjacent to the church. To the south was the chapter house, where the deliberations of the abbey took place and the monks met to transact business and to listen to a daily reading of a chapter of the Rule of St Benedict. At Netley this was a magnificent apartment divided into three aisles with vaults springing from four columns; a stone bench ran around the walls for the monks to sit on, and the abbot's throne was in the centre of the east wall. The entrance to the chapter house from the cloister is via an elaborately moulded arched doorway, flanked on each side by a window of similar size. The windows had sills and columns of Purbeck Marble, the whole forming an impressive composition appropriate to the second most important space in the abbey after the church. The windows on either side of the door would have been unglazed, so as to allow representatives of the laybrothers (who were not members of chapter) to listen to debates. The chapter house was also the site of some tombs, traditionally those of the abbots of a monastery. When the room was excavated, archaeologists discovered scattered human remains and evidence of graves beneath the medieval floor level, indicating that a number of burials.

The parlour lies south, an austere, barrel vaulted room little more than a passageway through the building. Here the monks could talk without disturbing the silence in the cloister, which Cistercian rules insisted on. South of this runs a long vaulted hall with a central row of pillars supporting the roof. This room was much altered over time and probably served several purposes during the lifetime of the abbey. Initially, it may have served as the monks' day room and accommodation for novices, but as time went on it may have been converted into the misericord where the monks—initially only the sick, but by the later middle ages the whole convent—could eat meat dishes not normally allowed in the main dining hall.

The monks' dormitory was on the top floor of the east range, a long room with a high pitched roof (the mark of which can still be seen on the transept wall) which ran the length of the building. This was entered by two staircases: the day stair went down into the cloister in the south-east corner; the night stair led into the south transept of the church to allow the monks to get easily from bed to choir at night. Initially the dormitory was an open hall, with the monks' beds placed along the walls, one under each of the small, slit-like windows. During the fourteenth century, when views of the necessity of sleeping in the same space together for the common life changed, the dormitory at Netley would, as at other houses, have been divided into sections with wooden dividers to give every monk his own private area, each leading off a central corridor. The treasury, a tiny vaulted room, was at the north end of the dormitory, presumably located for security at night.

=== Reredorter and infirmary ===
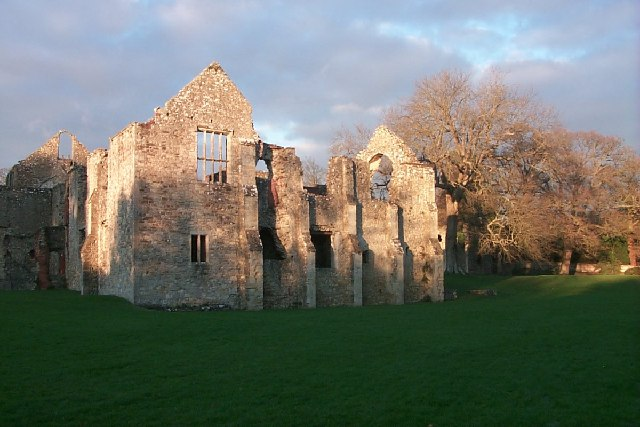
Façade of the reredorter (communal latrine), with the windows of the Tudor long gallery on the left

Another large building lies crosswise at the south end of the east range. Its lower level consists of a vaulted hall equipped with a grand thirteenth-century hooded fireplace and its own garderobe. It is not clear what this chamber was used for, but it may have been the monastic infirmary—if so, it was a most unusual, perhaps unique, arrangement. Normally in a medieval Cistercian monastery an infirmary with its own kitchens, chapel and ancillary buildings would have been located east of the main buildings around a second, smaller cloister, but at Netley these seem to be absent. So far, excavations have not revealed whether Netley had a separate infirmary complex.

The upper floor of this building was the reredorter or latrine. It is a large room with a door conveniently leading into the monks' dormitory. The stalls were in the south wall and the effluent dropped into an underground stream which runs in a vaulted passage underneath the building.

To the west of the reredorter block was the buttery, a room where the monks' wine (some of it direct from the king's cellars at Southampton) and beer were stored. Excavations in this area have revealed fragmentary remains which may be part of a separate kitchen for the richer diet allowed to the residents of the infirmary.

=== South range ===
During the Tudor conversion of the abbey to a private house the south range was extensively rebuilt, and only the north wall of the medieval structure remains, which makes tracing the monastic layout difficult. Going east to west, first came the day stair, then the warming house where the communal fire burned constantly to allow the monks to warm themselves after long hours of study in the unheated cloister. The room was probably vaulted and had its great fireplace on the west wall to allow heat to rise to the refectory or dining hall next door. It is likely that, as at the great Cistercian house Fountains Abbey, the chamber above the warming house was the muniment room, where the abbey's charters, records and title deeds, as well as those of local lords, were kept.

The refectory projected south from the centre of the range, as was usual in Cistercian monasteries. This is now almost completely demolished save for the north wall, although the foundations survive underground and have been excavated. It was a long hall with a dais for the abbot and important guests at the south end. There was a pulpit in the west wall to allow a monk to read to the community during the meal. The kitchen lies west; it had a central fireplace, as was Cistercian custom, and was placed to allow food to be served through hatches both to the choir monks' refectory and to the separate dining hall for the lay brothers on the west side.

=== West range ===
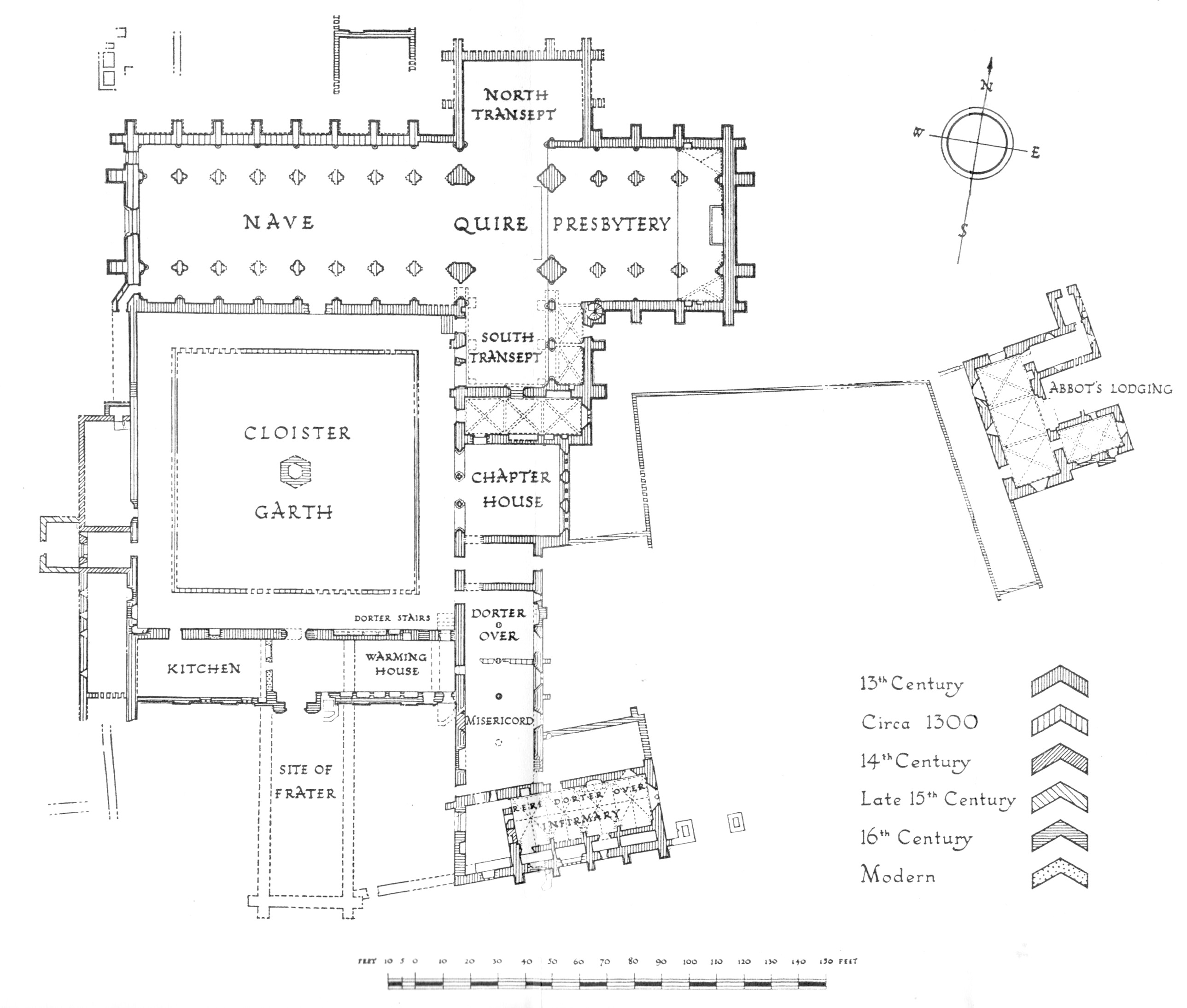
Plan of the abbey

The west range at Netley is small and does not run the full length of the west side of the cloister. It is divided in two by the original main entrance to the abbey, with an outer parlour where the monks could meet visitors. North of this on the ground floor were cellars for food storage, and to the south was the lay brothers' refectory. The upper floor, reached by a stair from the cloister, was the dormitory for the lay brothers. Netley was a late foundation, built at a time when the lay brothers were a declining part of the Cistercian economy, and it is probable that they were fewer in number, hence the small size of the accommodation needed. By the time the west range was completed in the fourteenth century they were rapidly disappearing, and had all but vanished by the end of the century. During the late fourteenth and fifteenth centuries most Cistercian houses took advantage of the large area of the monastery then left empty and converted the lay brothers' quarters to new uses. At some houses, such as Sawley Abbey in Lancashire, a series of comfortable chambers for the use of monastic officials or guests were built; elsewhere, such as Hailes Abbey in Gloucestershire, the west range was turned into a private dwelling of great elegance for the abbot. The ruins of the west range at Netley are too fragmentary to be sure of their purpose in the latter part of the medieval period.

All the buildings around the cloister were finished in the fourteenth century. There were subsequently few major structural changes during the monastic period aside from the re-vaulting of the south transept of the church at the end of the fifteenth century. It is likely, however, that there were many internal changes to match the rising standards of living during the later Middle Ages (as seen at Cleeve Abbey in Somerset) that have left no evidence on the surviving remains.

=== Precinct ===
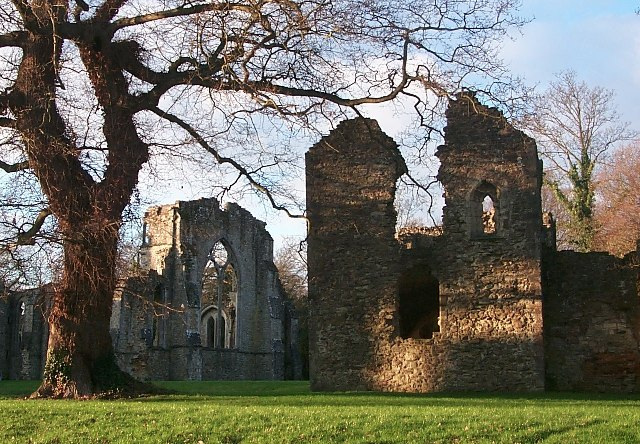
The abbot's house with the church and cloister to the left

A stone building to the east of the main complex is thought to have been the abbot's house. It contains two levels of vaulted apartments consisting of two halls, bedchambers, a private chapel and service rooms. The upper level was reached by an external staircase, which allowed this floor to be used independently if needed.

The central core of the monastery was surrounded by a precinct containing an outer (public) courtyard and an inner (private) courtyard, gardens, barns, guesthouses for travellers, stables, fishponds, the home farm and industrial buildings. The site was defended by a high bank and moat, part of which remains east of the abbey. Entrance was strictly controlled by an outer and inner gatehouse. A chapel, known as the capella ante portas (Latin for chapel outside the gates) was placed by the outer gatehouse for the use of travellers and the local population. Of the precinct buildings, only the abbot's house, the moat and the fishponds have left visible remains.

Netley's fresh water was supplied by two aqueducts which ran for several miles east and west of the abbey, up into the areas of modern Southampton and Eastleigh. The remains of the eastern aqueduct, now known as Tickleford Gully, can be seen in Wentworth Gardens, Southampton.

== Monastic history ==
Henry III added to the endowment left by Peter des Roches, donating farmland, urban property in Southampton and elsewhere, and spiritual revenues from churches. By 1291, taxation returns show that the abbey had a clear annual revenue of £81, a comfortable income. However, shortly afterwards a period of bad management resulted in the abbey accruing substantial debts, and it was soon almost bankrupt. In 1328 the government was forced to appoint an administrator, John of Mere, to address the crisis. Despite forcing the abbot to apply revenues to debt repayment and to sell many of the estates, the operation was only partly successful. Ten years later the abbey was again appealing to the king for help with a disastrous financial situation. The monks blamed their problems on the cost of providing hospitality to the many travellers by sea, and the king's sailors who landed at the abbey. The king provided some small grants enabling the abbey to overcome its difficulties but the property sales meant that the abbey's income never recovered and it settled into what has been described as genteel poverty.

Nevertheless, Netley remained a much respected institution by its neighbours until the end of its life as a monastery. It was not known for scholarship, wealth, or particular fervour, but it was highly regarded for its generosity to travellers and sailors, and for the devout lives ("by Raporte of good Religious conversation") led by its monks. The abbot was summoned on many occasions to sit in Parliament with fellow prelates in the House of Lords as one of the Lords Spiritual. Surviving reports suggest the abbey had a peaceful and scandal-free domestic life.

== A surviving book ==
It is not a unique case among English medieval monasteries that almost nothing has survived of what must have been a number of books owned by the house as such or in the keeping of individual monks. These would include at least a small library with biblical texts, spiritual works and perhaps some books on practical subjects, bearing in mind that the management of the abbey plant would have been a considerable challenge. Furthermore, the celebration of the liturgy for a large part of the day and night would necessitate texts for the different participants, who as monks were for the most part not spectators but active participants, some of them with particular roles.

Current scholarship has identified a single book as having belonged to Netley Abbey; it is now conserved as British Library Arundel MS 69. The volume has an inscription, added in the 15th century on folio 265v: "Codex iste pertinet ad domum sancte Marie de Netteley" ("This codex (i.e. a book not a scroll) belongs to the house of Saint Mary of Netteley"). The volume itself is a Latin manuscript executed in the 13th century, a copy of Roger of Hoveden's Chronica ("Chronicles"). Roger (died c. 1201) was an English historian of the reigns of Henry II and Richard I particularly important for his account of the years 1148–1170. Little is known in detail about his life, but he may have been a priest and was a courtier to Henry II, and accompanied Richard I to the Holy Land on the Third Crusade and served as a local justice in the north of England, and more generally as a negotiator between the crown and various barons and monastic houses.

== Dissolution ==
In 1535 the abbey's income was assessed in the Valor Ecclesiasticus, Henry VIII's general survey of Church finances prior to the plunder, at £160 gross, £100 net, which meant the following year that it came under the terms of the First Suppression Act, Henry's initial move in the Dissolution of the Monasteries. At the beginning of the following year, the King's commissioners, Sir James Worsley, John Paulet, George Paulet and William Berners, delivered a report to the government on the monasteries of Hampshire which provides a snapshot of Netley on the eve of the Dissolution. The commissioners noted that Netley was inhabited by seven monks, all of them priests, and the abbey was:

A hedde house of Monkes of thordre of Cisteaux, beinge of large buyldinge and situate upon the Ryvage of the Sees. To the Kinge's Subjects and Strangers travelinge the same Sees great Relief and Comforte.

— Sir James Worsley

In addition to the monks, Netley was home to 29 servants and officials of the abbey, plus two Franciscan friars of the strict Observant part of that order who had been put into the abbot's custody by the King, presumably for opposing his religious policies. The royal officers also found plate and jewels (these were certainly objects for worship, such as reliquaries or crosses) in the treasury worth £43, "ornaments" worth £39, and agricultural produce and animals worth £103. The abbey's debts were moderate at £42.

Abbot Thomas Stevens and his seven monks were forced to surrender their house to the King in the summer of 1536. Abbot Stevens and six of his brethren—the seventh opted to resign and become a secular priest—crossed Southampton Water to join their mother house of Beaulieu. Abbot Stevens was appointed Abbot of Beaulieu in 1536 and administered it for two years until Beaulieu in turn was forced to surrender to the King in April 1538. The monks received pensions after the fall of Beaulieu; Abbot Thomas ended his days as treasurer of Salisbury Cathedral, and died in 1550.

== Country house ==
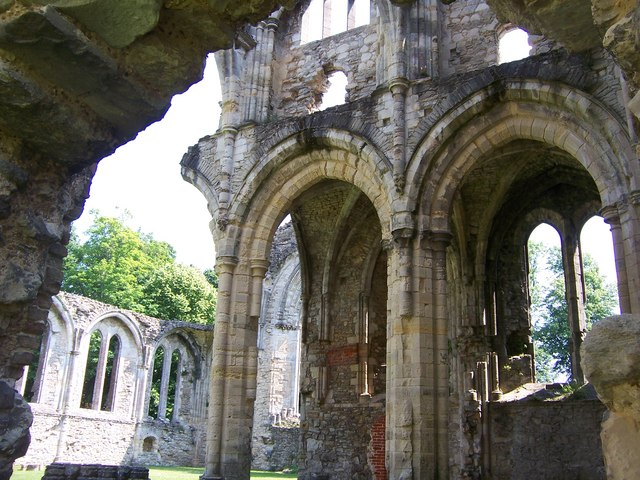
The south transept showing the surviving arcade and chapels. After the Dissolution this area became William Paulet's private apartments.

Following the dissolution of Netley, on 3 August 1536, King Henry granted the abbey buildings and some of its estates to Sir William Paulet, his Lord Treasurer and subsequently Marquess of Winchester. As soon as he took over, Sir William started the process of turning the abbey into a palace suitable for one of the most important politicians in England. He converted the nave of the church into his great hall, kitchens and service buildings, the transepts and crossing became a series of luxurious apartments for his personal use, the presbytery was retained as the chapel of the mansion. The monks' dormitory became the long gallery of the mansion and the latrine block became several grand chambers. He demolished the south range and refectory and built a new one with a central turreted gatehouse to provide the appropriate seigneurial emphasis needed for a classic Tudor courtyard house. He likewise demolished the cloister walks to make a central courtyard for his house and placed a large fountain in the centre. The precinct buildings were demolished to create formal gardens and terraces.

His eventual successor William Paulet, 4th Marquess of Winchester (c.1560–1629) of Basing House, Hampshire, on encountering financial difficulties, sold Basing and Hound in 1602 to Edward Seymour, 1st Earl of Hertford (1539–1621), of Tottenham House in Wiltshire, who used it as a residence, and died there in 1621. His eventual descendant William Seymour, 3rd Duke of Somerset (1652–1671) died aged 19 without progeny when his title passed by law to his heir male but his unentailed estates including Netley and Hound, passed top his sister Elizabeth Seymour, wife of Thomas Bruce, 2nd Earl of Ailesbury (1656–1741), who sold Netley in 1676 to Henry Somerset, 3rd Marquess of Worcester (1629–1700), later Duke of Beaufort.

Theophilus Hastings, 7th Earl of Huntingdon, inhabited the abbey until the close of the seventeenth century.

== Romantic ruin ==
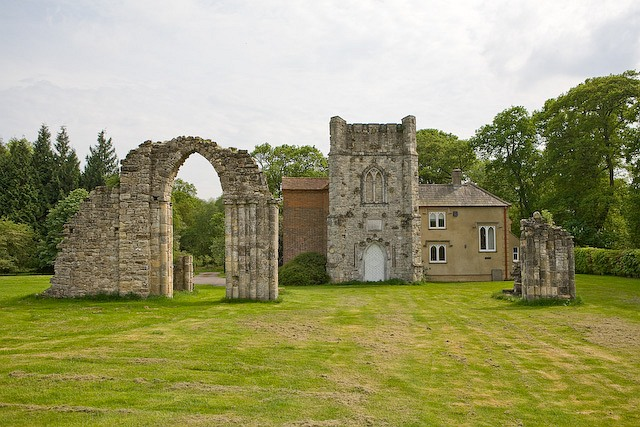
The Castle, Cranbury Park. Built from fragments of the north transept of Netley Abbey moved to Cranbury Park in the 1760s.

Around 1700, Netley Abbey came into the hands of Sir Berkeley Lucy (also spelled Sir "Bartlet"), who decided in 1704 to demolish the by now unfashionable house in order to sell the materials. Sir Berkeley made an agreement with a Southampton builder, Mr Walter Taylor, to take down the former church. However, during the course of the demolition, the contractor was killed by the fall of tracery from the west window of the church and the scheme was halted.

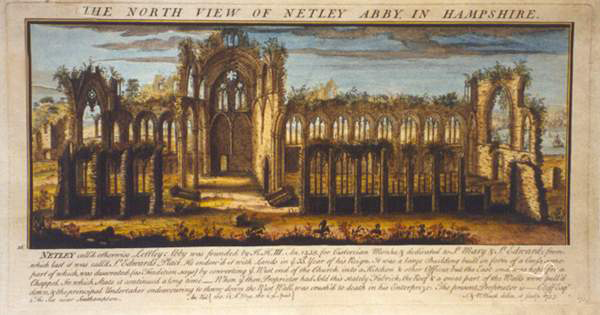
This print with hand-colouring by the antiquarian engravers Samuel and Nathaniel Buck in 1732–1733 shows the abbey church fundamentally as it stands today.

The abbey was subsequently abandoned and allowed to decay. In the 1760s Thomas Dummer, who owned estates in the area, moved the north transept to his estate at Cranbury Park near Winchester where it can be still be seen as a folly in the gardens of the house (at 51°00′08″N 01°21′49″W).

By the second half of the eighteenth century, the abbey, by then partially roofless and overgrown with trees and ivy, had become a famous ruin that attracted the attention of artists, dramatists and poets. In the nineteenth century, Netley became a popular tourist attraction (the novelist Jane Austen was among those who visited) and steps were taken to conserve the ruins. Archaeological excavations directed by Charles Pink and Reverend Edmund Kell took place in 1860. During the same period the owners decided to remove many of the Tudor additions to the building to create a more medieval feel to the site, resulting in the loss of much evidence of the abbey's post-Dissolution story.

In 1922, the abbey was passed into state care by the then owner, Tankerville Chamberlayne, one time Member of Parliament (MP) for Southampton. Conservation and archaeological work on the abbey has continued.

== In literature and art ==
Soon after the abbey had been allowed to fall into ruin, it began to attract the attention of artists and writers, and was a popular subject throughout the eighteenth and nineteenth centuries. In 1755, the antiquarian Horace Walpole praised the ruins in his letters following a visit with the poet Thomas Gray, claiming they were "In short, not the ruins of Netley, but of Paradise". In 1764, George Keate wrote The Ruins of Netley Abbey, A poem, which showed a romantic appreciation of the ruins and evoked sympathy for the life formerly led there by the monks. He prefaced his poem with a heartfelt plea for the preservation of the remains.

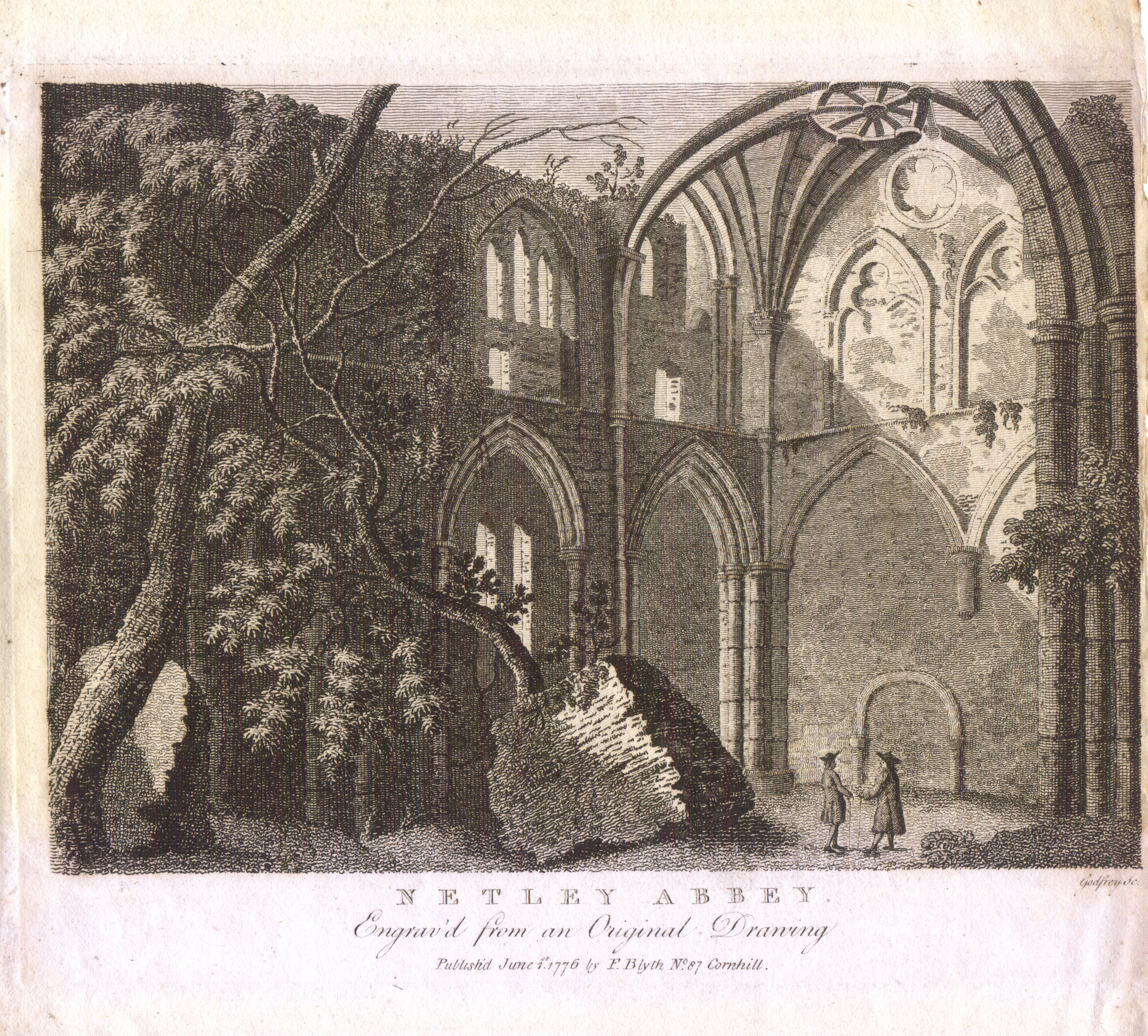
A pair of gentlemen visit the ruined south transept in 1776. Of particular interest is the high vault of the church, which has since collapsed.

Keate was followed by other romantic poets including William Sotheby (Ode, Netley Abbey, Midnight, 1790). Sotheby's view of the abbey was gothic; he peoples the ruins with spectral processions and ghostly Cistercians. Nor was he the only one; in 1795 Richard Warner wrote a potboiler entitled Netley Abbey, a Gothic Story in two volumes, featuring skullduggery at the abbey during the middle ages. Dark deeds before the Dissolution also appeared in the section of Richard Harris Barham's Ingoldsby Legends (1837–1845) covering Netley. This complex satire pokes fun at the medieval church and the monks (whom he accuses of having walled up an erring nun in one of the vaults and ensuring God's revenge upon them) and the tourists who crowded contemporary Netley, while at the same time showing appreciation of the beauty of the ruins.

Netley Abbey, an Operatic Farce, by William Pearce, was first performed in 1794 at Covent Garden. The set of the first production featured an elaborate mockup of the abbey ruins seen in the moonlight.

The earliest surviving depiction of the abbey is by the engravers Samuel and Nathaniel Buck, who specialised in landmarks and great ruins. Their engraving (1733) shows the church of the abbey much as it is today, with the exception of the high vault of the south transept still present. The picture has notable errors and was clearly done from memory and rough sketches. The most famous artist to paint the ruins was John Constable, whose 1833 painting of the west end of the church shows it among trees.

== Present day ==
=== Condition ===
The visitor today will find the shell of the church and monastic buildings around the cloister plus the abbot's house. Little of the post-Dissolution mansion remains aside from the south range, foundations, alterations to the medieval structure in red Tudor brick and traces of the formal gardens. In most places the abbey stands close to its original height. The sacristy/library, the south transept chapels, the treasury, the reredorter undercroft and the lower floor of the abbot's house still have their vaults intact. Medieval heraldic polychrome tiles found on the site can be seen in the sacristy, and Henry III's foundation stone remains in the church. The abbey ruins are set in wooded parkland to the west of the village of Netley and constitute the most complete surviving Cistercian monastery in southern England. The site is maintained by English Heritage, and is open to the public. Netley is an Ancient Monument protected by law.

=== Events ===
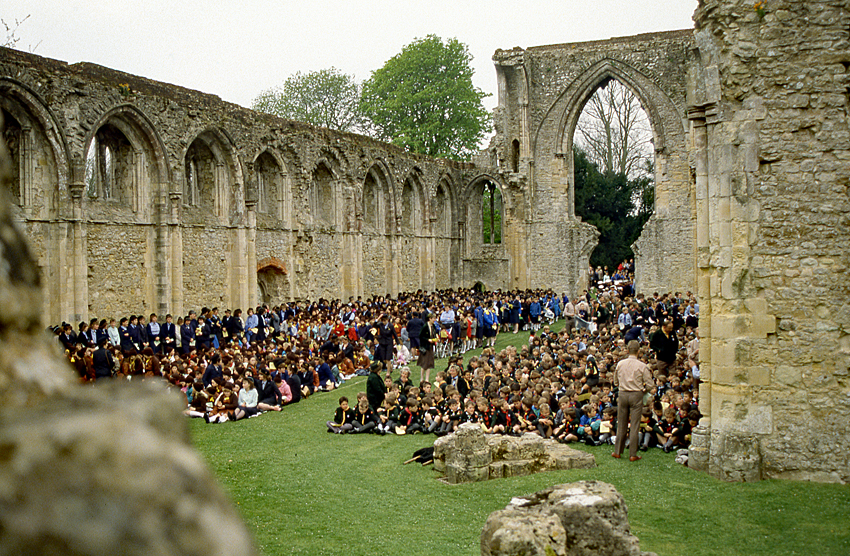
Southampton scout groups St George's Day parade at Netley Abbey

During the summer months the abbey is occasionally host to events such as open-air theatre and was the site of a flashmob wedding on 25 June 2011.

=== 2018 closure ===
Netley Abbey was closed to the public in June 2018 due to safety concerns. English Heritage has taken the decision after scaffolding set up in the nave for conservation work was found to "fall far short" of expected standards.

== Local legends ==
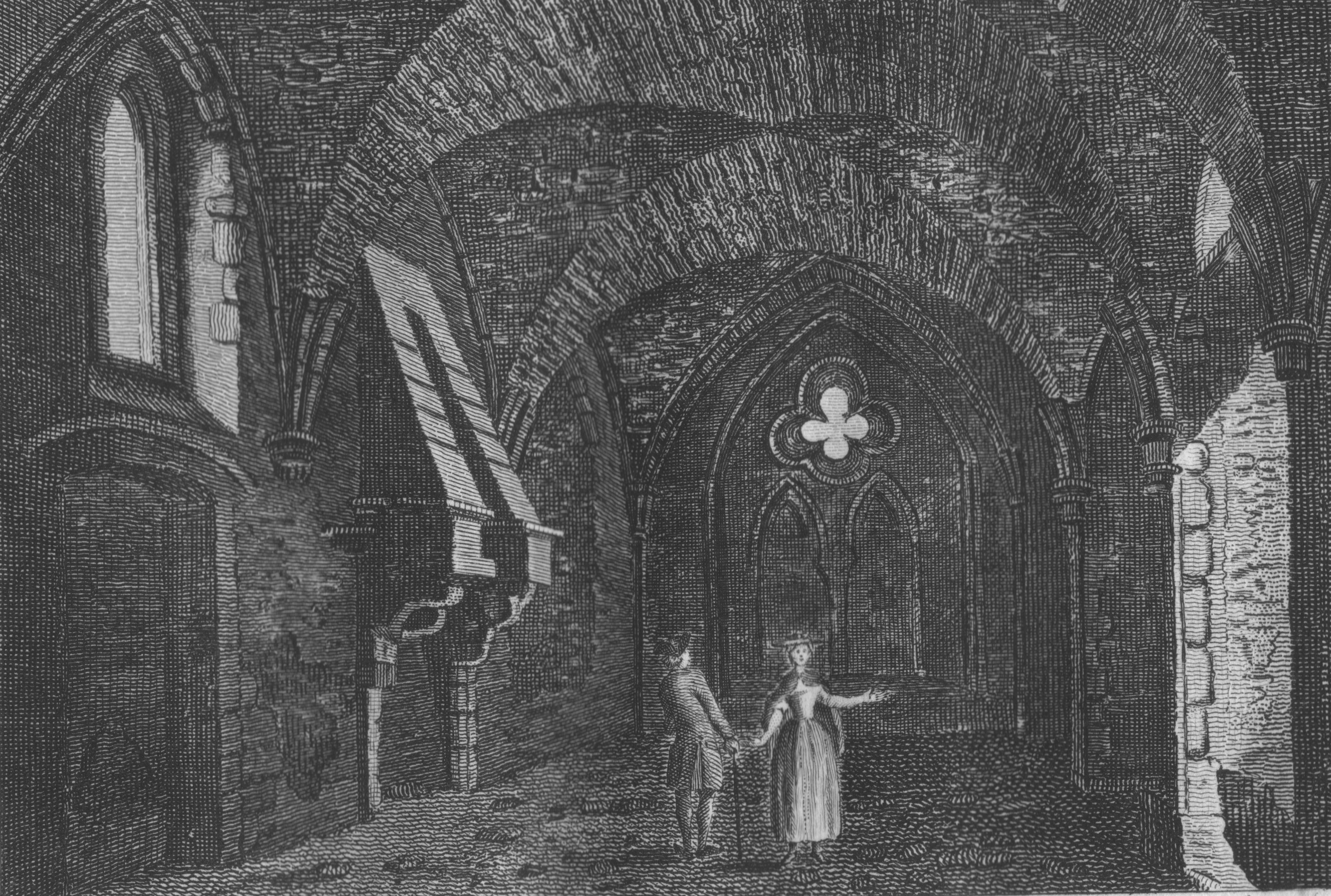
A lady and gentleman explore the lower floor of the reredorter in 1784.

=== Walter Taylor ===
Over the years several legends have grown up around the abbey, the best attested of which is that of Walter Taylor, the builder contracted to demolish the church. Legend has it that before starting the work he was warned in a dream that he would be punished if he committed sacrilege by damaging the building. The story is recounted by the eighteenth-century antiquary Browne Walters:

The earl (sic), it is said, made a contract with a Mr. Walter Taylor, a builder of Southampton, for the complete demolition of the Abbey; it being intended by Taylor to employ the materials in erecting a town house at Newport and other buildings. After making this agreement, however, Taylor dreamed that, as he was pulling down a particular window, one of the stones forming the arch fell upon him, and killed him. His dream impressed him so forcibly that he mentioned the circumstance to a friend, who is said to have been the father of the well-known Dr. Isaac Watts, and in some perplexity asked his advice. His friend thought it would be the safest course for him to have nothing to do with the affair, respecting which he had been so alarmingly forewarned, and endeavoured to persuade him to desist from his intention. Taylor, however, at last decided upon paying no attention to his dream, and accordingly began his operations for the pulling down of the building; in which he had not proceeded far, when, as he was assisting at the work, the arch of one of the windows, but not the one he had dreamed of (which was the east window still standing), fell upon his head and fractured his skull. It was thought at first that the wound would not prove mortal; but it was aggravated through the unskilfulness of the surgeon, and the man died.

— Browne Walters

=== Blind Peter ===
Another local legend states that during the Dissolution of the Monasteries the abbey's treasure was hidden down a secret tunnel with a lone monk to guard it. After many years of searching a treasure hunter called Slown is said to have entered an underground passage he had discovered only to return a few moments later screaming, "In the name of God, block it up," before dropping dead.

=== The walled up nun ===
The story of the nun walled up in a small room recounted in Richard Barham's The Ingoldsby Legends was a creation of the author and has no basis in fact or genuine folklore, as the author himself admits with a smile in his notes to the poem, attributing his story to one James Harrison:

a youthful but intelligent cab driver of Southampton, who "well remembers to have heard his grandmother say that 'Somebody told her so'."

— Richard Harris Barham
