= Peter des Roches =

13th-century Bishop of Winchester and Justiciar of England

- Bishop of Winchester
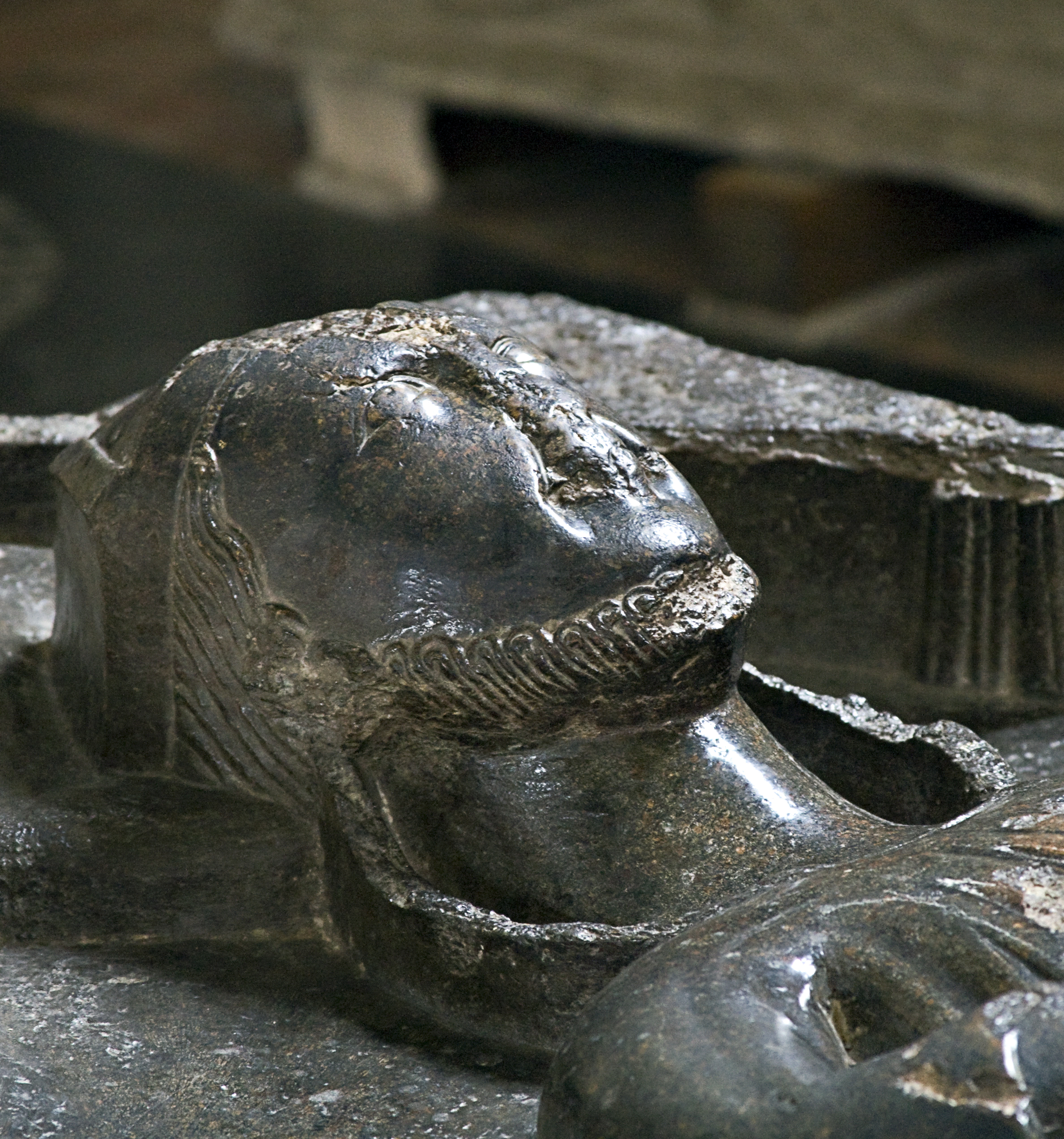
- Head of the effigy on Roches' tomb in Winchester Cathedral
- Appointed: 1205
- Term ended: 9 June 1238
- Predecessor: Richard Poore
- Successor: Ralph Neville
- Other posts: Precentor of Lincoln; Archdeacon of Poitiers

Orders
- Consecration: 24 March 1206 by Pope Innocent III

Personal details
- Died: 9 June 1238
- Denomination: Catholic

Chief Justiciar of England
- In office 1213–c. 1215
- Monarchs: John; Henry III
- Preceded by: Geoffrey Fitz Peter
- Succeeded by: Hubert de Burgh

Peter des Roches (died 9 June 1238) (Latinised as Petrus de Rupibus ("Peter from the rocks")) was bishop of Winchester in the reigns of King John of England and his son Henry III. He was a native of the Touraine, in north-central France.

== Biography ==
Towards the end of Richard I's reign, Peter became Lord Chamberlain and an influential counsellor. He held the ecclesiastical offices of Archdeacon of Poitiers, treasurer of Poitiers, and was a precentor of the diocese of Lincoln in 1204.

In early 1205, through John's influence, Peter was elected to the see of Winchester. His election was disputed but, on appeal, confirmed on 25 September 1205 by Pope Innocent III. Peter was consecrated on 24 March 1206, and stood by John's side during the whole period of the papal interdict due to John's refusal to accept Stephen Langton as Archbishop of Canterbury.

In 1213 Peter was made Chief Justiciar in succession to Geoffrey Fitz Peter. This promotion was justified by the fidelity with which Peter supported the king through the First Barons' War. However, by 1215, Hubert de Burgh was Chief Justiciar. In 1216, Peter was named Sheriff of Hampshire.

At the battle of Lincoln in 1217 Peter led a division of the royal army and earned some distinction by his valour; but he played a secondary part in the government so long as William Marshal held the regency. After Marshal's death in 1219 Peter led the baronial opposition to Hubert de Burgh, with varying success. At first the justiciar was successful.

Peter was responsible for founding several monasteries in England and France, including Titchfield Abbey and Netley Abbey, both in Hampshire, England, and La Clarté-Dieu in Poitou, France. He gave his protection to the first group of Dominican friars to come to England in 1221.

In 1225 a plot to ship Eleanor of Brittany to France was reported. She was the cousin of Henry III and so always posed a potential threat to the crown and was thus viewed as a state prisoner and then confined at Bristol Castle. The plot might have been false and only fabricated to discredit Peter, and he eventually fell out of royal favor in spring 1234.

Peter participated in the Sixth Crusade alongside William Briwere, who was Bishop of Exeter. An army of other crusaders accompanied them to the East, although whether they were English or mercenaries recruited on the Continent is unclear. The contingent left from Brindisi in August 1227. Both bishops were influential advisors to Frederick II the Holy Roman Emperor even though Pope Gregory IX had ordered that no one collaborate with Frederick, who was at the time excommunicated. Both bishops ignored the papal orders and worked closely with Frederick's agents and Frederick himself. The financial resources both bishops brought were especially appreciated by the crusaders. On the 18th of February 1229, both bishops were witnesses at the Treaty of Jaffa which restored Jerusalem to the Christians. After the crusade, he spent time in Italy.

In July 1232 Hubert de Burgh was overthrown by the action of Peter des Roches who then became the chief minister of Henry III. Peter persuaded him to revoke royal charters in favour of Peter and his associates, provoking a civil war in 1233 and leading to his own downfall in 1234. Peter died on 9 June 1238.

== Legends ==
The Lanercost Chronicle relates that Peter, out hunting one day, encountered King Arthur, dined with him, and asked for a token of their meeting. Arthur told him to close his hand, then open it, whereupon a butterfly flew out. For the rest of his life Roches was able to repeat this miracle, so that he became known as the Butterfly Bishop.

== Citations ==
Political offices
Preceded by Geoffrey Fitz Peter	Chief Justiciar; 1213 – c. 1215	Succeeded by Hubert de Burgh
Catholic Church titles
Preceded by Richard Poore	Bishop of Winchester; 1205–1238	Succeeded by Ralph Neville
