= Abbey of La Clarté-Dieu =

Abbey in Indre-et-Loire, France

Coordinates: 47.6015°N 0.4562°E

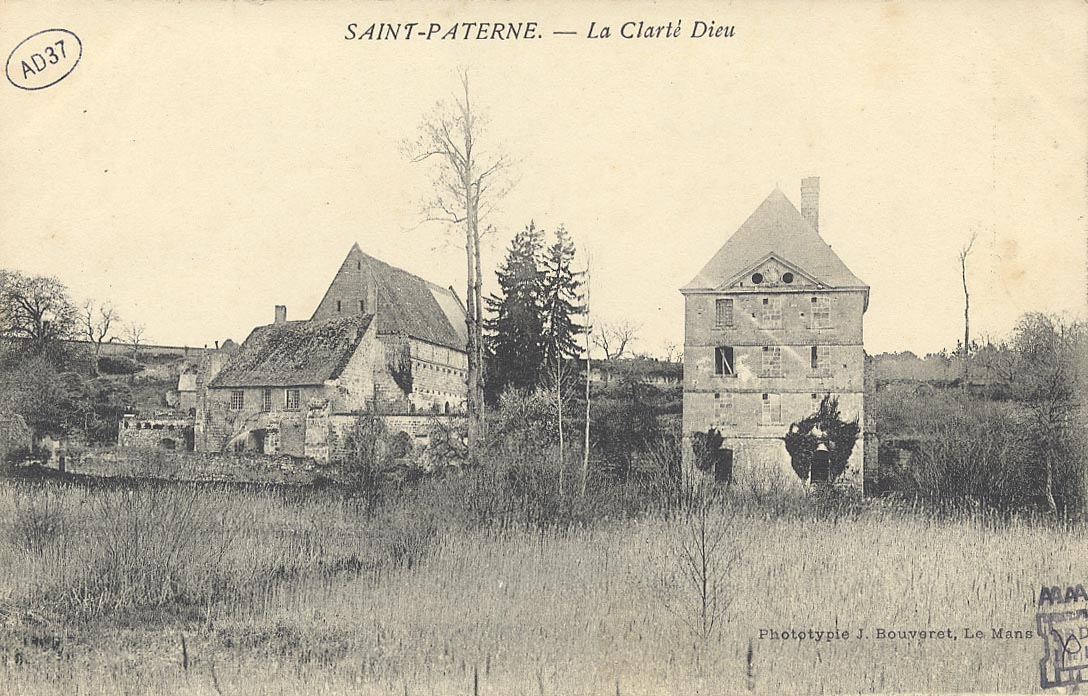
Abbey site (postcard of c. 1900)

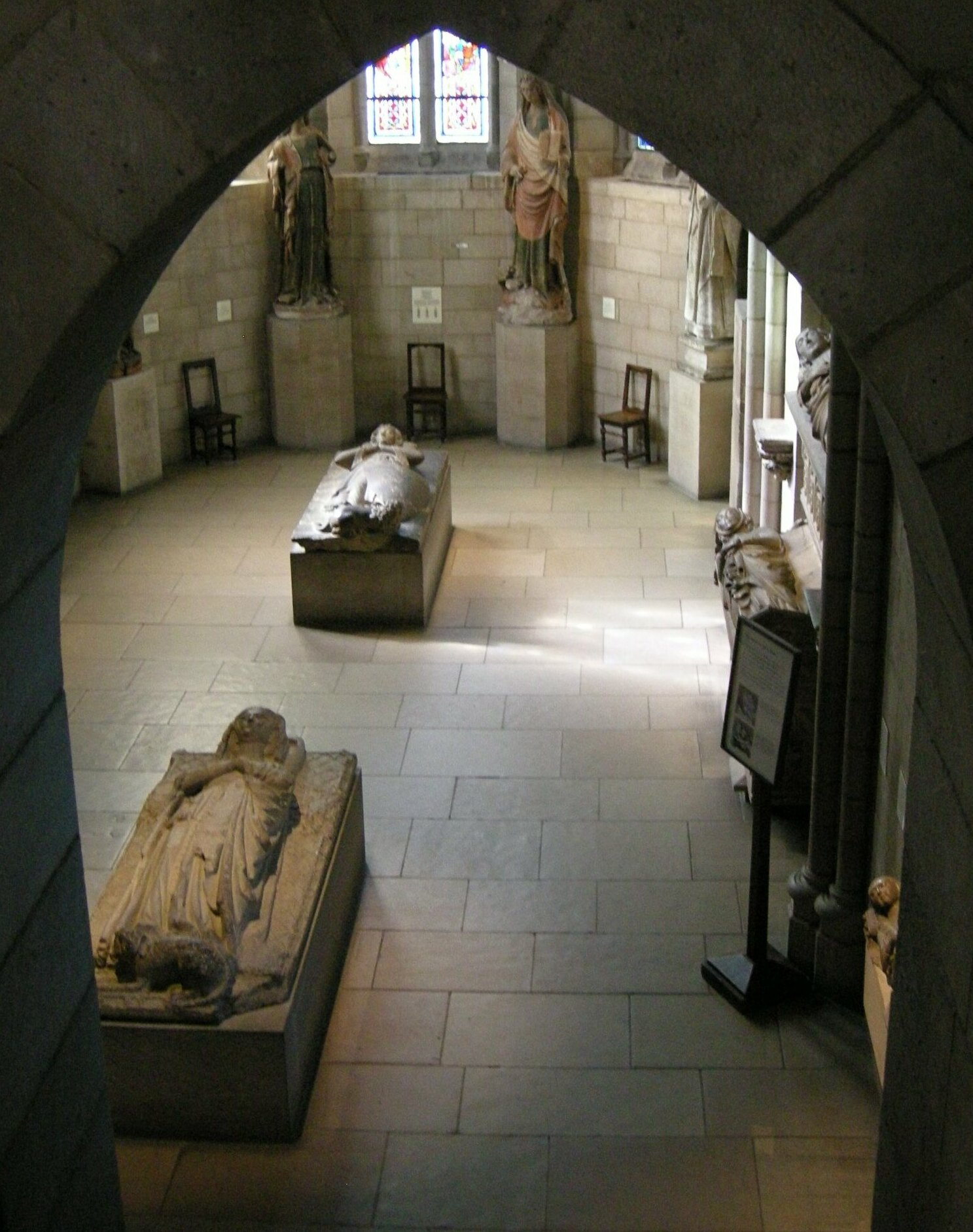
Tomb effigy of Jean d'Aluye (foreground), French, 13th century. Originally in the Abbey of La Clarté-Dieu in Northern France, now in the Cloisters, New York.

The Abbey of La Clarté-Dieu was a Cistercian monastery located in Saint-Paterne-Racan, France. The abbey was founded in 1239 by the executors of Peter des Roches, Bishop of Winchester, as one of a pair, the other being Netley Abbey in Hampshire, England. The bishop had conceived the idea of founding a pair of monasteries some years before and had begun collecting the necessary endowments for them, but his death in 1238 prevented him from completing the project. The first monks arrived at the site in 1240.

The abbey was severely damaged in the course of the Hundred Years War and the cost of rebuilding proved a heavy burden on the finances of the community. Nevertheless, La Clarté-Dieu managed to survive until the French Revolution when it was closed and sold off along with all the other monasteries of France. Following the revolution the abbey was for a long time used as a farm and some of the buildings were allowed to fall into ruin. Despite this, much of the mediaeval abbey remains in excellent condition along with some fine post-mediaeval additions. The abbey is preserved as a monument historique and is open to the public.
