= Reredorter =

Communal latrine in mediaeval monasteries

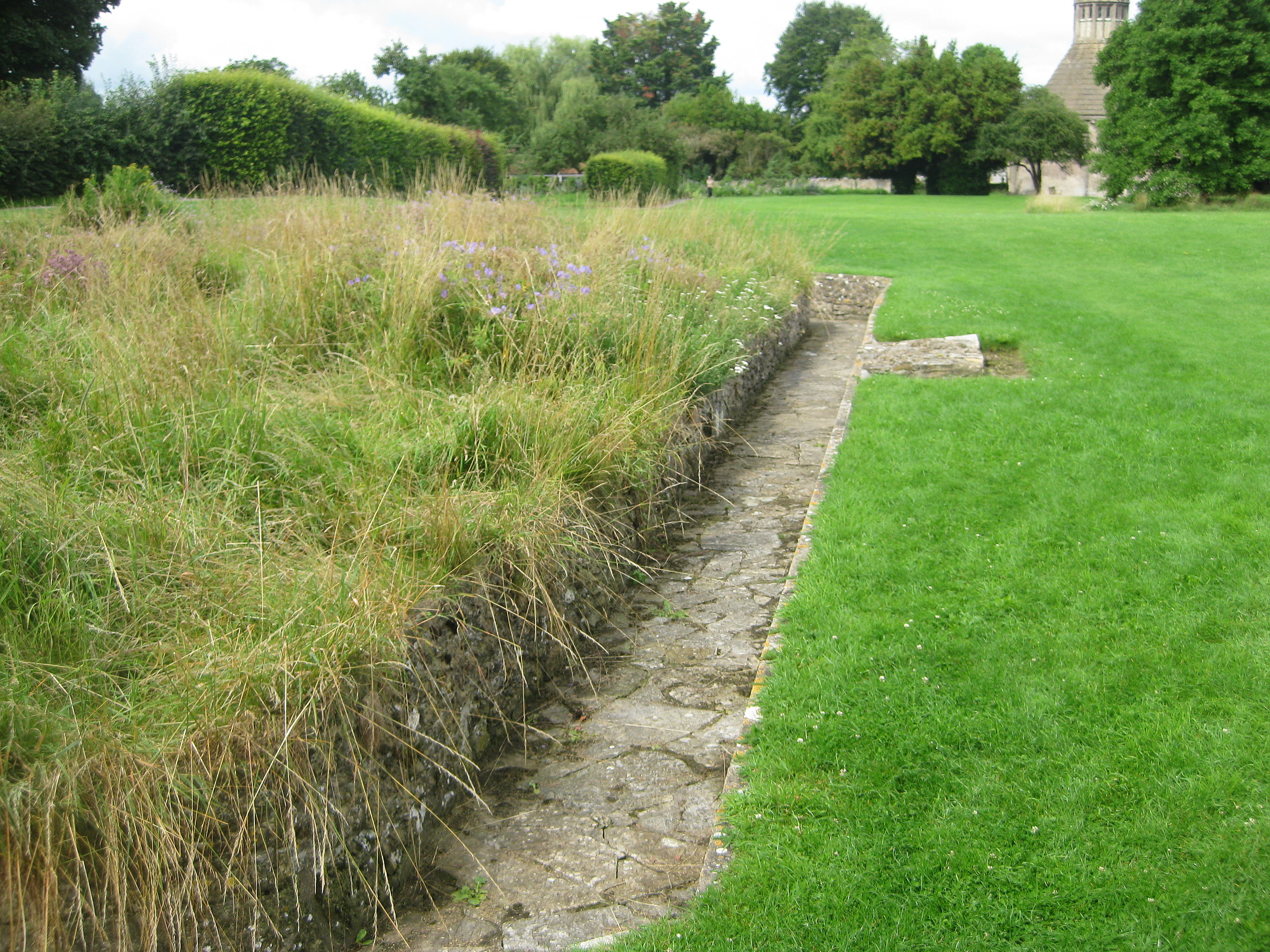
Remains of the reredorter at Glastonbury Abbey

The reredorter or necessarium (the latter being the original term) was a communal latrine found in mediaeval monasteries in Western Europe and later also in some New World monasteries.

== Etymology ==
The word is composed from dorter and the Middle English prefix rere-, coming from Anglo-French rere "backward, behind," from Latin retro. It was coined in the 19th century; the mediaeval term was necessarium (place of necessity).

== Siting and features ==
It was normally attached to the south end or the east side of the monks' dormitory or "dorter" on the east of the main cloister, that is, the end away from the church, with seats arranged on the first floor of the building allowing direct access from the dormitory. Waste fell down chutes or between walls (as far as 7 metres (23 ft)) and was usually carried away by a stream, river or conduit; availability of a suitable stream was often a factor in siting a monastery, and some monasteries have unusual ground plans to enable facilities such as the reredorter to have access to the water.

Sophisticated water engineering was used at Cîteaux Abbey, Roche Abbey and the Carmelite Desierto de Los Leones in Mexico to ensure both that these rooms remained fresh and that the effluent did not pollute water needed for cooking and washing. There appear to have been as many seats as there were monks, separated by screens, and each with a window.

In some monasteries there were two reredorters, one for the monks and one for the lay brothers. The lay brothers' reredorter was most often to the west of the cloister, attached to their dormitory in a similar way to that of the monks. An example was at Valle Crucis Abbey in Clwyd.
