= List of monastic houses in Devon =

The following is a list of the monastic houses in Devon, England.

Monasteries in Devon
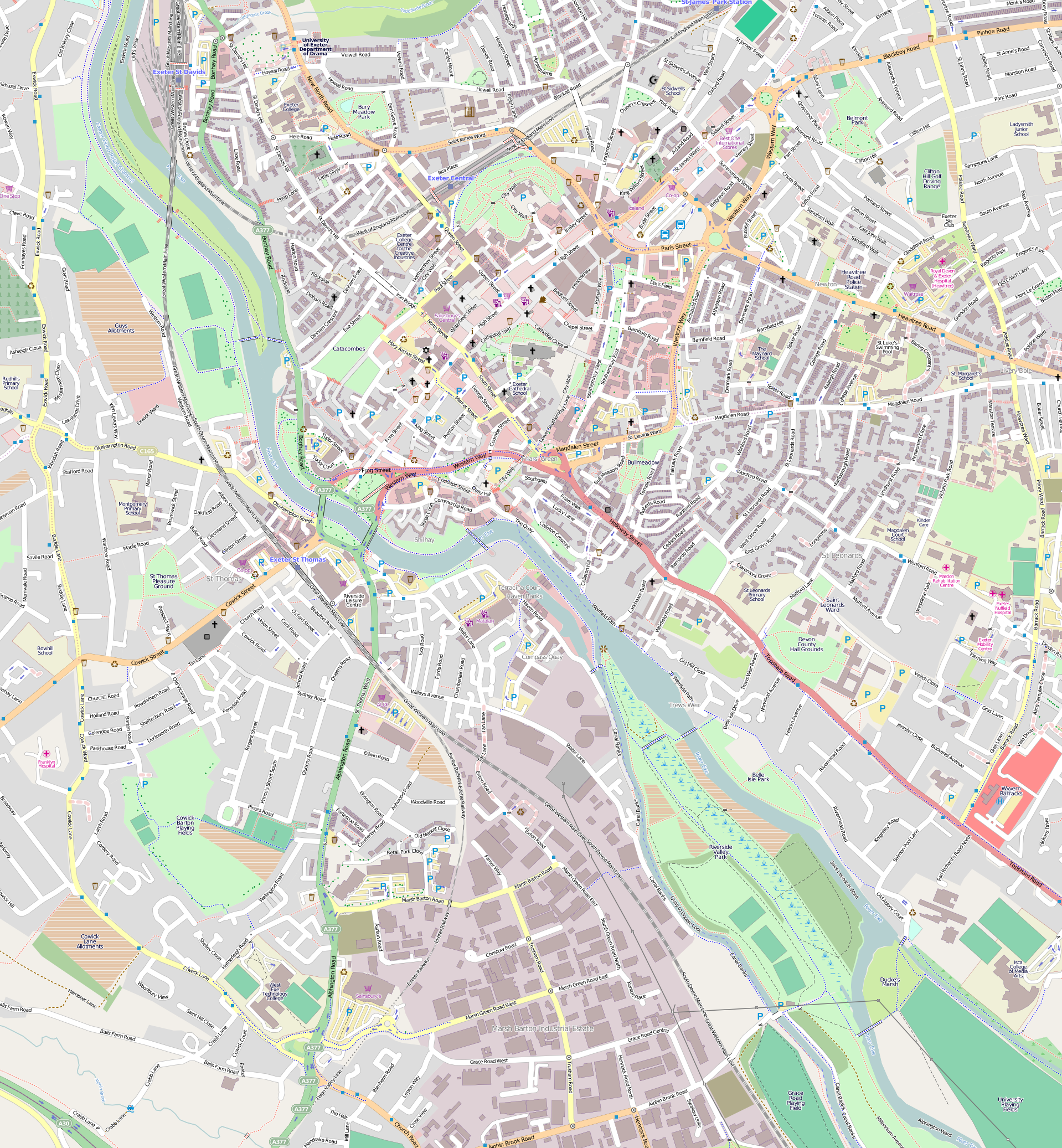
Monasteries in Exeter
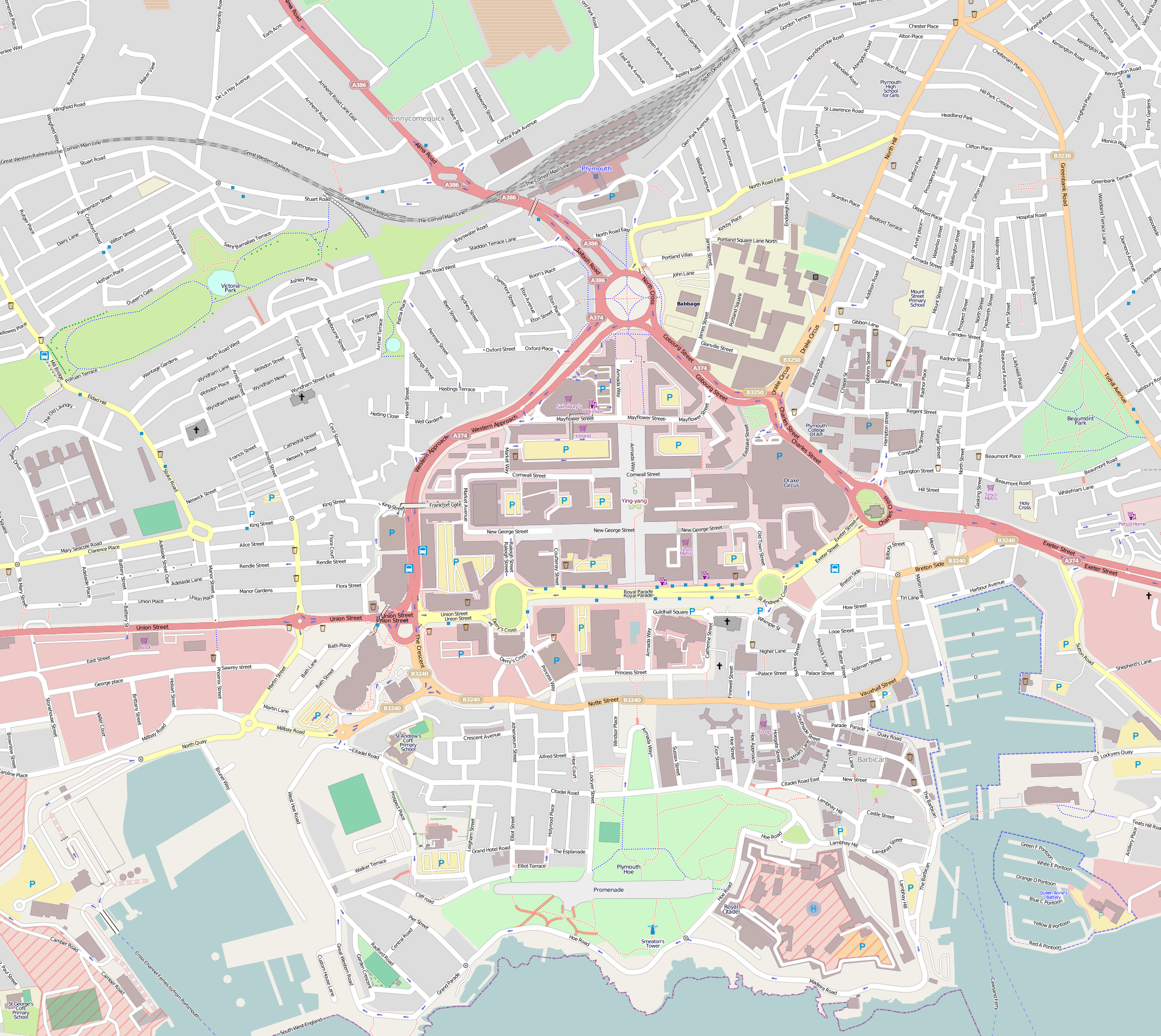
Monasteries in Plymouth Central

Alien houses are included, as are smaller establishments such as cells and notable monastic granges (particularly those with resident monks), and also camerae of the military orders of monks (Knights Templar and Knights Hospitaller). Monastic hospitals are included where they had the status or function of an abbey, priory, or preceptor/commandery.

Abbreviations and key

Status of remains
Symbol	Status
None	Ruins
*	Current monastic function
^{+}	Current non-monastic ecclesiastic function (including remains incorporated into later structure)
^	Current non-ecclesiastic function (including remains incorporated into later structure) or redundant intact structure
^{$}	Remains limited to earthworks etc.
^{#}	No identifiable trace of the monastic foundation remains
^{~}	Exact site of monastic foundation unknown
^{≈}	Identification ambiguous or confused

Locations with names in italics indicate possible duplication (misidentification with another location) or non-existent foundations (either erroneous reference or proposed foundation never implemented) or ecclesiastical establishments with a monastic name but lacking actual monastic connection.

Trusteeship
EH	English Heritage
LT	Landmark Trust
NT	National Trust

Foundation	Image	Communities & provenance	Formal name or dedication & alternative names	References & location
Allerton Cell		Benedictine hermits cell dependent on Tavistock		50°26′31″N 3°44′42″W
Axminster Monastery ^{~}		Saxon monks or secular canons collegiate founded before 757 when Cyneheard the atheling was interred in the minster; secular canons collegiate founded c.936 by King Athelstan; made dependent on York, Yorkshire 1060 by Edward the Confessor; dissolved 1535; collegiate and parochial church of St Mary possibly built on site during the Norman period		50°46′54″N 2°59′58″W (possible)
Axmouth Priory		Benedictine monks alien house: possible monastic grange, dependent on Montebourg; founded before 1387 (during the reign of Henry II) by Richard de Rivers, Earl of Devonshire; dissolved 1414; granted to Walter Erle (Earl) 1552		50°42′50″N 3°02′58″W
Barnstaple Priory		Cluniac monks alien house: daughter house of St-Martin-des-Champs, Paris founded c.1107 (before 1199) by Johel of Totness; became denizen: independent from 1403; dissolved 1535; granted to William, Lord Howard 1537/8	The Priory Church of Saint Mary Magdalene, Barnstaple The Church of Saint Mary the Virgin	51°05′19″N 4°03′45″W
Barnstaple Austin Friary (?)		Augustinian Friars licensed 1348 and 1353 — apparently never established due to objection by the prior of the Cluniac house		
Burlescombe Priory ^{≈}		Augustinian Canons Regular recorded in the time of Richard I, (probably Canonsleigh Priory, in the parish of Burlescombe)	Burdlescombe; possibly Canonsleigh	
Bodmiscombe Preceptory		Knights Hospitaller founded after 1200(?) (possibly during the reign of Henry III); dissolved before 15th century?; apparently absorbed by Buckland 14th/15th century	Bothemescomb Preceptory	50°52′50″N 3°16′06″W
Braunton Monastery		traditionally site of monastery purportedly founded 5th century by St Branock (Brynach of Nevern)		
Brightley Priory ^{#}		Cistercian monks — from Waverley, Surrey founded 3 May 1136 (or 1132, 1133 or 1138) by Richard fitz Baldwin de Brioniis, Lord of Okehampton and Sheriff of Devon; abandoned 1141; transferred to Forde, Dorset; site now occupied by Brightley Farm, where a building is possibly a monastic chapel		50°45′31″N 3°59′18″W (approx)
Buckfast Monastery		Benedictine monks founded 1018 by Aylward, Duk; Buckfast Abbey (see immediately below) built on site		50°29′35″N 3°46′32″W
Buckfast Abbey *		Savignac monks — from Savigny founded 27 April 1136 by Ethelwerd, son of William Pomerei; built on site of Benedictine monastery (see immediately above); Cistercian monks orders merged 17 September 1147; dissolved 1539; granted to Sir Thomas Dennys 1539/40; became ruinous Benedictine monks priory founded 1882, rebuilt 1884 to 1938 (church 1906 to 1938); raised to abbey status 1902; affiliated to the English Congregation 1960; extant	The Abbey Church of Our Lady, Buckfast ____________________; Buckfastre Abbey	50°29′35″N 3°46′32″W
Buckland Abbey		Cistercian monks — from Quarr, Isle of Wight founded 1278 by Amicia, Countess of Devonshire; dissolved 1539; granted to Sir Richard Greynfeld (Grenville) 1541/2; converted into a mansion named the 'Cider House' by 1576; sold to Sir Francis Drake 1581; remained with that family to 1946; house granted to NT 1949 currently principally in use as a museum; (NT)	The Abbey Church of Saint Benedict, Buckland	50°28′52″N 4°08′01″W
Canonsleigh Abbey ^		On site of Leigh, in the parish of Burlescombe; Augustinian Canons Regular — from Plympton? priory founded c.1161-1173 by Walter II de Claville, (a descendant of the Domesday Book tenant Walter I de Claville), lord of the manor of Burlescombe; dissolved before 1285; Augustinian Canonesses abbey founded before 1285 by Maud, Countess of Devon; dissolved 1539; remains now incorporated into farm buildings	The Priory Church of the Blessed Virgin Mary and Saint John the Evangelist, Leigh (1161–1285) The Priory Church of the Blessed Virgin Mary and Saint John the Evangelist and Saint Etheldreda, Leigh (1285–1539) ____________________; Leigh Abbey; Canon's Leigh; Burlescombe Priory? (see above)	50°56′53″N 3°19′46″W
Chudleigh Abbey		Brigittine nuns transferred from Spettisbury, Dorset 1887; transferred to Marley House, Rattery (now Syon Abbey) 1925	The Abbey Church of Saint Bridget of Syon, Chudleigh	
Churchill Monastery		uncertain order and foundation		51°09′11″N 4°00′03″W (approx)
Cornworthy Priory		Augustinian Canonesses founded 1205/1238 by the Edgecomb family; dissolved 1539; granted to Edward Harris and John Williams 1560	Court Prior	50°23′19″N 3°39′31″W
Cove		Knights Hospitaller member of Bodmiscombe Preceptory		
Cowick Priory ^{#}		Benedictine monks alien house: cell dependent on Bec-Hellouin; founded 1144: granted as cell to Bec-Hellouin by William Fitz-Baldwin; became denizen: granted to Eton College 1451; granted to Tavistock after 1464; dissolved 1538	The Priory Church of Saint Andrew, Cowick ____________________; Cowick Priory	50°43′15″N 3°32′30″W
Crediton Monastery		monks founded 739; secular episcopal diocesan cathedral founded 909: see reputedly transferred from Bishops Tawton (Note: Crediton — see transferred from Bishops Tawton to Crediton, T. Tanner, Notitia Monastica, p.86; cf S. Baring-Gould, Devon (ed. 1916), p.107); see transferred to Exeter 1050; secular collegiate refounded 1050; dissolved 1548	St Gregory (possibly)	50°47′23″N 3°39′08″W
Dartmouth Austin Friars		Augustinian Friars (under the Limit of Oxford) (founded at Clifton in Dartmouth 1331); dissolved before 1348; church of St Petrox built on site 16th century		50°20′32″N 3°33′58″W (possible)
Dartmouth Monastery		monks? uncertain order and foundation chapel of St Patrick in the Castle annexed as a cell to a "great abbey"		
Denbury Priory		Benedictine monks dependent on Tavistock; founded 1086; dissolved 1539; site now on Wrenwell Farm	Denbury Cell; Denbury Grange	50°30′00″N 3°39′55″W
Dunkeswell Abbey		Cistercian monks daughter house of Forde, Dorset; founded 16 November 1201 by William Briwere; dissolved 1539; granted to John, Lord Russell 1534/5; site in multiple ownership, with the Holy Trinity parish chapel built on site 1842		50°51′48″N 3°13′17″W
Exeter Cathedral Priory ^{+}		founded ?before c.690; Benedictine? monks 932 (see immediately below) secular canons founded 1050; episcopal diocesan cathedral founded 1050: see transferred from Crediton; extant	The Priory Church of the Blessed Virgin Mary and Saint Peter The Cathedral Church of Saint Peter in Exeter	50°43′21″N 3°31′47″W
Exeter Monastery		Saxon founded 868 by King Etheldred		50°43′21″N 3°31′44″W
Exeter Monastery		Benedictine monks founded 932 by King Athelstan; monks repeatedly fled through Danish raids but recalled by Canute 1019		50°43′21″N 3°31′44″W
Exeter Nunnery (?)		Augustinian Canonesses supposedly founded c.968; purportedly rebuilt as the Deanery 15th century Later sources deny its existence.		50°43′20″N 3°31′52″W
Exeter Priory (?)		Carthusian monks licence granted to Richard Stapleton 1331/2 to build and endow a monastery — apparently never established		
Exeter Blackfriars ^{#}		Dominican Friars (under the Visitation of London) founded before 1232; dissolved 1538; house named 'Bedford House' built on site, demolished 1773	Exeter Blackfriars	50°43′26″N 3°31′42″W
Exeter Greyfriars		Franciscan Friars (under the Custody of Bristol) founded before 1240; transferred by Thomas Bitton (Bytten), Bishop of Exeter, to new site south of the South City Gate c.1292-1303 (see immediately below); dissolved 1538		50°43′17″N 3°32′14″W
Exeter Greyfriars		Franciscan Friars (under the Custody of Bristol) transferred by Bishop Bytten from behind the North and West Gates c.1292-1303 (see immediately above)		50°43′19″N 3°32′08″W
Exeter — Polsloe Priory		Benedictine nuns founded before/c.1160: transferred from Oldbury, Warwickshire; dissolved 1536 (1538); granted to John, Earl of Warwick during the reign of Edward VI; largely demolished, remaining range converted into country house	The Priory Church of Saint Katherine, Polsloe ____________________; Polleshoo Priory	50°44′03″N 3°30′07″W
Exeter — St James Priory ^{#}		Cluniac monks daughter house of the abbey of St Martin-in-the-fields, Paris; founded before 1143 (1141) by Baldwin de Redverus (Redvers/Rivers), Earl of Devon; dissolved; house built on site called 'The Old Abbey'	St James	50°42′31″N 3°30′56″W
Exeter — St Nicholas Priory ^	St Nicholas Priory, Exeter	Benedictine monks — from Battle, Sussex founded 1087 by William the Conqueror; dissolved 1536; granted to Sir Thomas Denys 1540/1; private houses built on site 1820; monastic architecture restored; in ownership of Exeter Corporation 1913; open to public as a museum 1916; (closed for repair until 2008)	The Priory Church of Saint Nicolas, Exeter ____________________; Benedictine Priory of St Nicholas	50°43′19″N 3°32′06″W
Exminster Monastery ^{#}		pre-conquest monastic or secular community founded 8th century		50°40′49″N 3°29′42″W
Frithelstock Priory		Augustinian Canons Regular — Arroasian founded c.1220 by Sir Robert Beauchamp, Kt.; dissolved 1536; granted to Arthur Viscount Lisle 1537/8	The Abbey Church of Saint Mary and Saint Gregory, Frithlestock ____________________; Frethelstoke Priory; Fristoke Priory	50°57′18″N 4°11′19″W
Hartland Abbey		secular college founded before 1066 by Gytha, wife of Earl Godwin; Augustinian Canons Regular — Arroasian founded 1161-9 (secular collegiate church of St Nectan and its endowments granted to Richard, Archdeacon of Poictiers by Geoffrey of Dinam; approved by Henry II and Bartholomew, Bishop of Exeter); dissolved 21 February 1539; granted to William Abbot 1545/6; remains (cloisters) incorporated into house named 'Hartland Abbey' built on site	Hertland Abbey	50°59′46″N 4°30′27″W
Indio Monastery		uncertain order and foundation		50°35′17″N 3°40′46″W (approx)
Ipplepen Priory ^{#}		Augustinian Canons Regular alien house: cell, daughter house of St Pierre-Rille founded c.1143(?): church granted by the Fougères family to the priory, transferred from Notre-Dame-de-Fougères; dissolved c.1414; granted to Ottery St Mary 1438; house called 'The Priory' possibly built on site		50°29′16″N 3°38′22″W (approx)
Ivybridge Priory +		Sisters of the Sacred Hearts of Jesus & Mary — from St. Quay 1910; Augustinian (Augustinian Recollect) founded 1932; closed 2016 with building now in parochial use; originally 'Cadleigh House'	St Austin's Priory	50°23′24″N 3°56′59″W
Kerswell Priory		Cluniac monks alien house: cell dependent on Montacute, Somerset; founded 1119–1129; became denizen: independent from 1407; dissolved 1538 or 1539; granted to John Etherege (Atherege) 1546/7; 16th century house built on site	Careswell Cell	50°51′00″N 3°18′59″W
Leigh Cell		Sauvignac monks grange(?) dependent on Buckfast(?) founded c.1137(?); Cistercian monks orders merged 17 September 1147	Leigh Grange	50°18′34″N 3°48′39″W (approx)
Marsh Barton Priory ^{#}		Augustinian Canons Regular dependent on Plympton founded 1142; dissolved 1539	St Mary St Mary de Marsh	50°42′28″N 3°31′36″W
Modbury Priory		Benedictine monks alien house: dependent on St-Pierre-sur-Dives founded c.1140 by Sir Peter-sur-Dive, sic. (Note: Modbury — founder given by W. Cobbett: clearly confusing the name of the parent house), or (purportedly) by a member of the Chambernoun family; extant 1430; dissolved c.1441; granted to Eton College by Edward VI; nominally reverted to Tavistock c.1461-67	St George	50°20′55″N 3°53′25″W
Newenham Abbey		Cistercian monks daughter house of Beaulieu, Hampshire founded 6 January 1246 or 1247 by Reginald de Mohun, Earl of Somerset; dissolved 1539; leased to the Duke of Suffolk; granted to Thomas, Duke of Norfolk 1562/3	The Priory Church of the Blessed Virgin Mary, Newenham ____________________; Neuham Abbey	50°46′13″N 3°00′42″W
Otterton Priory		Benedictine monks alien house: cell dependent on Mont-St-Michel, Normandy; founded before 1087 by the monks of Mont-St-Michel; dissolved 1414; subsequently granted to Syon Abbey; granted to Richard Duke at the dissolution of Syon 1539; part of claustral building converted into mansion	Otterington Priory	50°39′32″N 3°18′10″W
Ottery St Mary Monastery	supposed pre-Conquest monastery ("disproved" (Note: Ottery St Mary — establishment disputed by T. Tanner, Notitia Monastica p.88))			
Pilton Priory^{+}		Benedictine monks founded ?before 12th century purportedly by King Athelstan (evidence lacking and disputed); dissolved 1539	The Priory Church of Saint Mary the Virgin, Pilton	51°05′18″N 4°03′45″W
Plymouth — St Dunstan's Abbey		Sisters of the Most Holy Trinity founded by Priscilla Lydia Sellon with the support of the Henry Phillpott, Bishop of Exeter; transferred to Berkshire 1906; property transferred to St Mary the Virgin at Wantage, who continued in use as St Dunstan Abbey School for Girls	The Abbey Church of Saint Dunstan, Plymouth; St Dunstan of Glastonbury	50°22′29″N 4°09′14″W
Plymouth Blackfriars(?)		purported Dominican Friars founded 1431; site now occupied by the Black Friars Distillery; possible confusion with Greyfriars		50°22′04″N 4°08′16″W
Plymouth Greyfriars		Franciscan Friars (under the Custody of Bristol) founded 1383; in private ownership 1513; dissolved 1538	Plymouth Friary	50°22′07″N 4°08′09″W
Plymouth Whitefriars ^{#}		Carmelite Friars founded before 1296–7; dissolved 1538		50°22′18″N 4°07′50″W
Plympton Priory		secular collegiate founded 904 (before 909); Augustinian Canons Regular church built on site 1121 by William Warlewas (Bishop of Exeter 1150-9); dissolved 1539	The Priory Church of Saint Peter and Saint Paul, Plympton	50°23′14″N 4°03′29″W
St Michael's Monastery		Benedictine monks purported cell dependent on Malmesbury	St Michael	
Sidmouth Priory (Augustinian) (?)		purported foundation of Augustinian Canons Regular probable confusion with Benedictine founded (see immediately below)		50°40′34″N 3°14′49″W
Sidmouth Priory		Benedictine monks alien house: cell or grange dependent on Mont St Michel founded 11th century: manor granted by William the Conqueror; dissolved 1414(?); Bridgettine monks grange of Syon Abbey c.1431; dissolved; remains incorporated in Marlborough Hotel		50°40′42″N 3°14′17″W
Tavistock Abbey		Benedictine monks founded 961/974 (or 975-80) (begun by Ordgar, Earl of Devonshire and completed by his son); dissolved 1539; granted to John, Lord Russell 1539/40; mansion built on site, now 'The Bedford Hotel'	The Abbey Church of the Blessed Virgin Mary and Saint Rumon, Tavistock ____________________; Tavestock Abbey	50°32′58″N 4°08′42″W
Teignmouth Abbey ^		Benedictine nuns (founded at Dunkirk, Flanders 1662, daughter of Ghent) transferred from Hammersmith, London 1862; now divided up as private housing	The Abbey Church of Saint Scholastica, Teignmouth	50°33′25″N 3°29′25″W
Torre Abbey		Premonstratensian Canons — from Welbeck, Nottinghamshire founded 1196 by William Briwere; dissolved 1539; granted to Sir John St.Leger 1543/4; country house built on site, now in ownership of Torbay Corporation	Torr Abbey	50°27′48″N 3°32′28″W
Totnes Priory		Benedictine monks alien house: cell dependent on St-Serge, Angers founded c.1088 by John Aluredi; became denizen: independent from before 1416; dissolved 1536; granted to Catherine Champernoun and others 1543/4; rebuilt priory church in parochial use, municipal buildings built on claustral site		50°25′55″N 3°41′16″W
Totnes Trinitarian Priory		Trinitarian monks founded 1271; dissolved 1509 (suppressed to 1519); granted to the vicars of Exeter Cathedral 1519; seized by the Crown; returned to the vicars 16th century until 1801	Little Totnes Priory; Werland Priory; Warland Priory	50°25′45″N 3°41′03″W
Townstall Monastery, Dartmouth		supposed alien cell		
Yodby Monastery		uncertain order and foundation		

== See also ==
- List of monastic houses in England
