= List of monastic houses in Dorset =

There are multiple monastic houses in Dorset, England.

Monasteries in Dorset

Alien houses are included, as are smaller establishments such as cells and notable monastic granges (particularly those with resident monks), and also camerae of the military orders of monks (Knights Templar and Knights Hospitaller). Monastic hospitals are included where they had the status or function of an abbey, priory, or preceptory/commandery.

Abbreviations and key

Status of remains
Symbol	Status
None	Ruins
*	Current monastic function
^{+}	Current non-monastic ecclesiastic function (including remains incorporated into later structure)
^	Current non-ecclesiastic function (including remains incorporated into later structure) or redundant intact structure
^{$}	Remains limited to earthworks etc.
^{#}	No identifiable trace of the monastic foundation remains
^{~}	Exact site of monastic foundation unknown
^{≈}	Identification ambiguous or confused

Locations with names in italics indicate possible duplication (misidentification with another location) or non-existent foundations (either erroneous reference or proposed foundation never implemented) or ecclesiastical establishments with a monastic name but lacking actual monastic connection.

Trusteeship
EH	English Heritage
LT	Landmark Trust
NT	National Trust

== Alphabetic listing ==
Foundation	Image	Communities & provenance	Formal name or dedication & alternative names	References & location
Abbotsbury Abbey ^{+}		secular canons collegiate founded c.1026 by Orcus, steward to Canute; Benedictine monks — from Cerne; founded 1044 (during the reign of Edward the Confessor) by Orcius or by his widow Tola (Note: Abbotsbury — foundation: T. Tanner, Notitia Monastica, p.105); dissolved 12 March 1539; granted to Sir Giles Strangwaies 1543/4; much in private ownership, partly in parochial use	The Abbey Church of Saint Peter ____________________; Abbotesbury Abbey; Abbodesbirig Abbey	50°39′52″N 2°35′56″W
Beaminster		pre-conquest monastic or secular community founded before 862	Bebingmynster	50°48′29″N 2°44′32″W (approx)
Bindon Abbey		Cistercian monks — from Little Bindon dependent on Forde; founded 22 or 27 September 1172 by Roger de Newburgh and his wife Maud; dissolved 1539; granted to Sir Richard Poynings 1540/1; now in private ownership		50°40′50″N 2°12′29″W
Blackmoor Priory Hermitage		order and foundation uncertain hermitage in existence by 1300, with brothers apparently following a rule similar to Augustinian Friars; dissolved/abandoned, becoming a free chapel after 1424	Hermitage	50°51′40″N 2°28′45″W (approx)
Bridport Whitefriars (?)		purported foundation for Carmelite Friars founded 1261; probably ceased to exist before 1365		50°43′31″N 2°46′00″W
Bridport Priory		order uncertain 13th century; converted into a residence named 'St Jones'		50°43′31″N 2°46′00″W
Cerne Abbey ^, Cerne Abbas		monastic before 604 founded by St Augustine (Note: Cerne — foundation: William of Malmesbury, Gesta Pontificum Anglorum, Rolls Series, 184-5) hermitage; secular ? 9th century; Benedictine monks founded before 987 by Engleward (Egelward) (Note: Cerne — foundation: T. Tanner, Notitia Monastica, p.104 states "Where the parish church is now was anciently an heremitage, after that a small monastery of three Religious, founded [citing J. Leland, Collectanea iii, p.67] founded pretty early in Saxon times by a rich man, named Egelward" [citing J. Leland, Collectanea, i, p.26 and William of Malmsbury — adding "if any credit is to be given to the legendary story in Capgrage's Life of St. Austin, that this monastery was originally founded by Augustin the monk, it outh (sic?) to be placed much higher. It must be conceded, that Reyner, tract. ii, p.138. and Camden in his Britannia, at Cerne, seem to believe this story; and that Camden quotes Will.Malmsbury for it. But quaere"]); purportedly destroyed by Canute (Note: Cerne — destruction: ibid., citing J. Leland, Collectanea, iii, p.67); dissolved 1539; granted to John Dudley and ___ Ascough 1574/5; remains now incorporated into private house	St Peter St Mary, St Peter and St Benedict St Edwold (St Athelwold) ____________________; Cernell Abbey	50°48′34″N 2°28′32″W
Charminster		pre-conquest monastic or secular community; parish church of St Mary (dating from 11th century) possible successor of minster on site		50°43′59″N 2°27′21″W
Chilcombe Camera		Knights Hospitaller dissolved before 1308		50°43′01″N 2°40′52″W
Christchurch Priory ^{+}		tradition of very early monastery; secular canons collegiate founded before/c.1060; manor and church granted by Henry I to Richard de Redvers and Baldwin de Redvers, Earl of Devon; Augustinian Canons Regular founded 1150, by petition of Hilary, Bishop of Chichester, and Henry of Blois, Bishop of Winchester, to Richard de Redvers, 2nd Earl of Devon; dissolved 28 November 1539; granted to Joseph Kirton 1545/6; on site of earlier church demolished 1094; priory church 1540, now in parochial use	The Priory Church of Christ, Christchurch Church of the Holy Trinity, Twyneham ____________________; Twyneham Priory; Twinham Priory	50°43′57″N 1°46′28″W
Cranborne Priory		tradition of early monastery Benedictine monks founded c.(?)980 by Haylward Snew (Aylward Sneaw (Snow)); becoming dependent on Tewkesbury (of which Cranborne was previously the mother house) in 11th century; abbot and 57 monks removed to Tewkesbury 1102, Cranborne reduced to priory status, becoming a cell dependent on Tewkesbury; dissolved 31 January 1540; granted to Thomas Francis 1559/60	The Abbey Church of the Blessed Virgin Mary and Saint Bartholomew The Priory Church of The Blessed Virgin Mary and Saint Bartholomew, Cranborne ____________________; Cranbourne Priory; Cranburn Cell	50°55′07″N 1°55′26″W
Dorchester Greyfriars ^{#}		Franciscan Friars Minor, Conventual (under the Custody of Bristol) founded before 1267 by "the ancestors of Sir John Chidiock"; dissolved 1538 (1536); granted to Sir Edmund Peckham 1543/4		50°43′01″N 2°26′08″W
Forde Abbey ^		Cistercian monks daughter house of Waverley, Surrey; (community founded at Brightley, Devon 1136 or 1138) transferred from Brightley 1146/8?; dissolved 1539; claustral remains now incorporated in a mansion with public access		50°50′33″N 2°54′41″W
Frampton Priory		Benedictine monks alien house: daughter house of the Abbey of Saint-Étienne, Caen, Normandy; founded before 1077 by William the Conqueror; dissolved before 1414; granted to St Stephen's College, Westminster 1437; granted to Sir Christopher Hatton 1571/2, who sold it to John Brown, Esq.		50°45′01″N 2°31′54″W
Fryer Mayne Preceptory		Knights Hospitaller founded before 1275; shared single preceptor with Baddesley 15th century; formally merged with Baddesley 1471; dissolved; granted to William Pole and Edward Downing 1563/4	Friary Mayne Preceptory; Friar Mayne Preceptory; Freyer Mayne Preceptory; Mayne Preceptory; Mayne Ospitalis	50°43′04″N 2°24′44″W
Gillingham Friary		possible Dominican Friars founded c.1267: Henry II granted oak for repair of the Dominicans' church; no other reference		51°01′59″N 2°17′12″W
Gillingham Minster		Saxon minster 19th century St Mary's Parish Church possibly on site		51°02′18″N 2°16′39″W
Hilfield Friary *		Franciscan Friars founded 1921 in farm buildings; extant	The Friary of Saint Francis, Hilfield	50°50′18″N 2°31′31″W
Holme Priory		Cluniac monks alien house: dependent on Montacute founded 1142 (mid 12th century or c.1107) by Robert de Lincoln; became denizen: independent from 1407; dissolved 1539; granted to John Hannon 1547; parish church until 1746; mansion named 'Holme Priory House' built on site of remains	The Blessed Virgin Mary ____________________; East Holme Priory; Holne Priory; Holme Cell	50°40′24″N 2°08′39″W
Horton Priory		Benedictine monks abbey founded 961 (960 or (c.)970) by Ordgar, Earl of Devonshire, or his son Ordulph (Edulph); probably destroyed in raids by the Danes 997; refounded c.1050; reduced to priory cell status 1122 under Henry I, dependent on Sherborne; dissolved 1539; granted to Edward, Duke of Somerset 1547; then to William, Earl of Pembroke; 18th-century church built on site of ruins of previous parochial church on the site of the priory	St Wolfrida ____________________; Horton Abbey; Horton Cell	50°52′00″N 1°57′31″W
Iwerne Minster		pre-conquest monastic or secular community; parish church of St Mary possible successor of minster on site		50°55′46″N 2°11′20″W
Kingston Camera		Knights Hospitaller member of Fryer Mayne, with Stinsford church		50°43′07″N 2°24′36″W (approx)
Little Bindon Abbey		Cistercian monks — from Forde founded 1149 by William de Glastonia; transferred to Bindon 1172; much of the masonry used in the construction of Lulworth Castle		50°37′05″N 2°14′29″W
Loders Priory		Benedictine monks alien house: daughter house of Montebourg Abbey, Normandy founded c.1107 (during the reign of Henry I) by Richard de Redvers; Carthusian monks under the charterhouse of St Anne at Coventry 1399-1414; priory church now in parochial use; Bridgettine nuns (under Syon, Isleworth) 1414	St Mary Magdalen ____________________; Lodres Priory	50°44′45″N 2°43′21″W
Lulworth Abbey		Trappist monks — from La Valsainte, Switzerland founded 1795 by Mr Thomas Weld; raised to abbey status 1813; forced to leave England and returned to Melleray 1817	The Monastery of the Most Holy Trinity, Lulworth	
Lyme Friary (?)		Carmelite Friars — to be licensed to William Darre, chaplain — apparently never established	Lyme Regis Friary	
Lytchett Minster		pre-conquest monastic or secular community		
Melcombe Priory, Melcombe Regis		Dominican Friars (under the Visitation of London) founded 1418 by ___ Rogers Esq. of Bryanston; dissolved 1538; granted to Sir John Rogers 1543/4	Milton Friary; Melcombe Regis Friary	50°36′55″N 2°27′30″W (approx)
Milton Abbey ^, Milton Abbas		secular college founded 938 (or 933) by King Athelstan; Benedictine monks founded 964; destroyed by fire 1309; rebuilt 1322; dissolved 1539; granted to Sir John Tregonwell 1539/40; restored 1789 and 1865; domestic remains incorporated into a mansion 1771; the abbey church is owned by the Diocese of Salisbury but used by Milton Abbey School in term time as its chapel. The abbey church is open to the public and accessed through the school grounds.	The Priory Church of Saint Michael and Saint Mary, Milton The Abbey Church of The Blessed Virgin Mary, Saint Samson and Saint Branwalader, Milton ____________________; Middleton Abbey	50°49′11″N 2°17′15″W
Muckleford Grange		possible Tironensian monks alien house: cell (grange?) dependent on Tiron Abbey, Normandy; estate granted to Tiron, de facto controlled by Andwell (Hampshire)		50°44′29″N 2°30′33″W (approx)
Piddletrenthide Priory		Benedictine monks cell dependent on Hyde Abbey, Hampshire founded unknown; dissolved 1354 (1345?); chapel demolished after 1382	Piddletrenthide Cell	50°47′56″N 2°25′37″W
Poole — St George's Friary		Friars of St George — apparently a guild property		
Povington Priory		Benedictine monks alien house: grange: dependent on Bec-Hellouin; foundation date unknown, manor granted to Bec-Hellouin by Robert Fitz Gerold; dissolved 1230; reckoned to be a parcel of Ogbourne by 1291	Povington Grange	50°38′15″N 2°10′15″W
Shaftesbury Abbey		Benedictine nuns founded c.888 by Alfred (or before 860 by Alfred, his father Æthelbald and brothers Æthelbert and Ethelred), possibly on site of 7th-century Saxon minster (see immediately below); Benedictine nuns refounded during the reign of Edgar; dissolved 2 March 1539; granted to William, Earl of Southampton 1547/8; remains now within a walled garden	The Abbey Church of Saint Mary, Shaftesbury The Abbey Church of Saint Mary, Saint Edward, King and Martyr, Shaftesbury	51°00′19″N 2°11′55″W
Shaftesbury Minster		Saxon nuns possibly founded before c.670; destroyed? in raids by the Danes before 888; Benedictine nunnery possibly built on site (see immediately above)		51°00′19″N 2°11′55″W (possible)
Shapwick Grange		purported priory order and foundation uncertain; acquired by the Carthusians at Sheen, Surrey (Greater London) after 1414; (limited corroboration for existence and status)	Shapwick Priory	50°48′48″N 2°05′06″W
Sherborne Abbey ^		founded before 672: granted by Cenwealh, King of Wessex; Saxon minster and bishop's see secular episcopal diocesan cathedral priory founded 705; Benedictine monks cathedral priory refounded c.993; see transferred to Old Sarum between 1075 and 1078; raised to abbey status 1172; dissolved 18 March 1539; granted to Sir John Horsey 1546/7; church now in parochial use monastic buildings now incorporated into a public school	The Blessed Virgin Mary ____________________; Shireburn Abbey	50°56′48″N 2°31′00″W
Spettisbury Priory		Benedictine nuns alien house: cell dependent on Préaux Abbey, Normandy; founded before 1100 (during the reign of William II) by Robert de Beaumont, Count of Meulan and Earl of Leicester; annexed to Toft Monks 1324; privately leased 1390; granted to Witham Priory by Henry V; dissolved 1535; granted to Charles Blount, Lord Mountjoy 1543/4	dedication unknown ____________________; Spetisbury Priory; Spectesbury Priory	50°49′07″N 2°07′36″W
St Monica's Priory, Spetisbury		Augustinian Canonesses Regular of the Windesheim Congregation 1800; Bridgettine Nuns 1861; Canons Regular of the Lateran 1887; Ursuline Nuns 1907-1926; sold at auction to Thomas Oakley 9 June 1927	The Priory of Saint Monica, Spetisbury	50°49′18″N 2°07′31″W
Stour Provost Grange		Benedictine monks alien house: grange dependent on the Abbey of St-Leger, Préaux; founded c.1070; dissolved c.1471		50°59′17″N 2°18′02″W
Sturminster Marshall		pre-conquest monastic or secular community (Note: Sturminster Marshall: J. Hutchins, History of Dorset, 3rd edition revised by W. Shipp and J. W. Hodson, vol.3 (1868), p.367 reports a local tradition that a certain house in the village had once been the residence of monks)		
Sturminster Newton		pre-conquest monastic or secular community		
Tarrant Abbey		Anchoresses of no order founded c.1186; Cistercian nuns founded c.1100 by Richard le Poor, Bishop of Chichester (later of Salisbury), built by Ralph de Kahaynes; raised to abbey status before 1228; dissolved 13 March 1539; granted to Sir Thomas Wyat 1541/2; site now occupied by Abbey Farm; Tarrant Abbey House possibly incorporates remains of the abbey	St Mary and All Saints ____________________; Tarrant Crawford Abbey; Tarrant Kains Abbey; Tarrent Abbey; Tarrant Cell; possibly 'Camesterne' ('Camestrum') (St Mary Magdalene)	50°49′53″N 2°07′20″W
Wareham Nunnery		Benedictine? nuns alien house: reputedly founded c.672 (late7th/early8th century); said to have been destroyed in raids by the Danes 876; traditionally refounded 915 by Elfleda; dissolved 997-8: again destroyed by the Danes; destroyed again 1015; monastic property in possession of the Abbey of Saint Wandrille (which held the minster) 1086; Benedictine priory built on site (see immediately below)	The Blessed Virgin Mary ____________________ monasterium of holy virgins	50°41′03″N 2°06′28″W
Wareham Priory		Benedictine monks alien house: cell dependent on Lyre Abbey, Normandy founded 12th century (during the reign of Henry I) by Robert, Earl of Leicester on site of earlier nunnery (see immediately above); ownership passed to Mount Grace, Yorkshire 1398; dissolved 1414; Carthusian monks granted to the Carthusians at Sheen, Surrey (Greater London) after 1414; dissolved 1536; granted to Thomas Reve and George Cotton; house named 'The Priory of Lady St Mary House' ('The Priory') built on site 16th century, possibly incorporates remains of the priory	Lady St Mary Priory ____________________; Warham Priory	50°41′03″N 2°06′28″W
West Lulworth Priory		Cistercian monks — from Forde Abbey founded 1149 (or 1171(?) by William de Glastonia); transferred to Bindon 1172; site close to 13th century Little Bindon chapel		50°37′06″N 2°14′29″W
Wilcheswood Monastery		order uncertain founded 1373 by Roger le Walleys, lord of the manor of Langton Wallis (Note: Wilcheswood — foundation: Victoria County History: A History of the County of Dorset, Volume 2, p.98 cites Coker, Survey of Dorset, (1732), but states the foundation was "certainly founded many years earlier, probably in the first part of the century"); earliest dated charter 1295 (speculated to have followed Augustinian and Premonstratensian rules, or a small collegiate church); apparently dissolved 1536	St Leonard ____________________; Wilcheswood Priory; Wilkswood Priory	
Wimborne Minster		Benedictine? nuns and monks founded before 705 by Cuthburh; destroyed ? 998; converted into a college of secular canons before 1066; dissolved 1547; granted to Edward, Duke of Somerset 1547; then to Giles Keylway and William Leonard; then to Edward, Lord Clinton	St Cuthburga ____________________; Winburn Priory; Twinborn Priory	50°47′56″N 1°59′17″W
Winterborn Monkton Grange		Cluniac monks alien house: grange dependent on Cluny founded before 1214; dissolved c.1450	Winterborn Grange; Winterborn Monckton	50°41′26″N 2°28′07″W
Yetminster		Saxon minster		

== See also ==
- List of monastic houses in England
