= St Nicholas' Priory, Exeter =

Historic building in Exeter, England

Benedictine Priory of St Nicholas
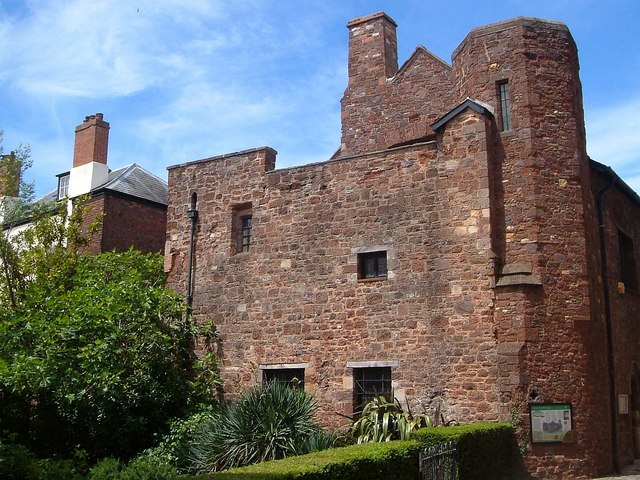
- St Nicholas Priory, Exeter

- Location within Devon and the United Kingdom

Religion
- Affiliation: Roman Catholic
- Ecclesiastical or organisational status: events venue
- Status: events and private hire

Location
- Location: Exeter, England
- Coordinates: 50.7218°N 3.5350°W

Architecture
- Type: Priory
- Completed: 1087

The Benedictine Priory of St Nicholas or just St Nicholas Priory was a Benedictine monastery founded in Exeter, England, in 1087. At the Dissolution of the Monasteries the church and chapter house range were pulled down but the domestic buildings were left intact. Parts of the north and west ranges of the monastery survive with the west range now being a museum owned by Exeter Historic Buildings Trust.

== History ==
In 1068, William the Conqueror laid siege to Exeter, where the mother of Harold Godwinson, whom he had just defeated in the Battle of Hastings, was living. After her hasty departure William gave the church of St Olave at Exeter to Battle Abbey. Monks, who were sent from Battle to administer the church and its possessions, set about building a monastery with its own church, which was dedicated to Saint Nicholas in 1087. In the 12th and 13th centuries the Priory gathered gifts of land and property, and new monastic buildings were erected as funds permitted. Hospitality was built into the monastic rule, and a guest house or wing was essential within a monastery. The monks provided hospitality for pilgrims and other travellers, and accommodation for important guests.

The Priory had a very important and lively life within the city until the dissolution of the smaller monasteries by King Henry VIII in 1536, when the monks were pensioned off and their church and cloisters were pulled down. Some of the stone was used to repair the nearby Exe Bridge. The remaining buildings and precinct were then sold by the Crown. Between 1575 and 1602, the building was turned into an impressive Elizabethan town house. After that the building became subdivided into houses and businesses. Between 1820 and 1913, the Priory was divided into five lots of premises, each of which were given entrance doors and new windows. Exeter Corporation bought the Priory in 1913 in order to restore it to show its original monastic architecture. It was opened to the public as a small museum three years later. Repairs and reinterpretation were undertaken in 2007 with funding from the HLF and Renaissance. During the 2007 development, the Priory was partially restored to how it looked when it was a wealthy Tudor merchant’s house, with methods used at the same period 500 years ago. Then, at the beginning of 2009, the priory had further maintenance, which was carried out by Devon-based Sub-Lime Renovations.

It is designated as a Grade I listed building by Historic England.

== From Museum to Events Venue ==
From 1916, the priory was used as a museum. It is currently furnished as an Elizabethan town house, home of the wealthy Hurst family, in 1602. It has replica furniture and it is painted in the bright colours used in the Elizabethan period. It gives an insight into Tudor life from Exeter's collection of artefacts. It has been enhanced with modern amenities such as toilets and a gift shop. After being closed as a result of structural problems from 2015 until 2018, it was reopened under the Exeter Historic Buildings Trust as an events and private hire venue. It is open to explore for free every Sunday (13:00–16:00) from February to November, and runs an events programme throughout the year.

== See also ==
- Exeter Blackfriars
- Exeter Cathedral
- Exeter Greyfriars
- Exeter monastery
- Polsloe Priory
- St James Priory, Exeter
