= Marston Magna =

Village and civil parish in Somerset, England

Coordinates: 50.9994°N 2.5839°W

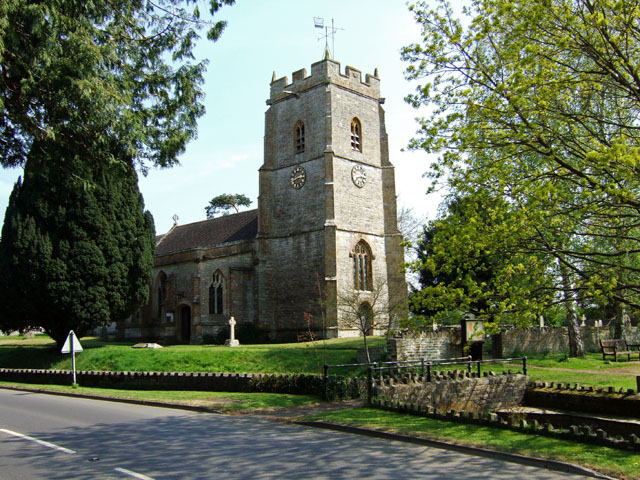
- Church of St Mary, Marston Magna

- Location within Somerset
- Population: 523 (2011)
- OS grid reference: ST591224
- Unitary authority: Somerset Council
- Ceremonial county: Somerset
- Region: South West
- Country: England
- Sovereign state: United Kingdom
- Post town: YEOVIL
- Postcode district: BA22
- Dialling code: 01935
- Police: Avon and Somerset
- Fire: Devon and Somerset
- Ambulance: South Western
- UK Parliament: Glastonbury and Somerton

Marston Magna (also known as Broad or Great Marston) is a village and civil parish in Somerset, England, situated 5 miles (8.0 km) north of Yeovil. The village has a population of 523.

== History ==
The name Marston Magna means larger settlement by a marsh.

It was held as nine separate estates before the Norman Conquest.

The parish was part of the hundred of Horethorne.

The site of the medieval manor house survives as a moat and fish ponds south of the village.

In the early 18th century the estate was held by Sir John St Barbe, 1st Baronet (d.1723) and was passed on through the families of Ashington and Sydenham of Combe, Dulverton, Somerset.

== Governance ==
The parish council has responsibility for local issues, including setting an annual precept (local rate) to cover the council's operating costs and producing annual accounts for public scrutiny. The parish council evaluates local planning applications and works with the local police, district council officers, and neighbourhood watch groups on matters of crime, security, and traffic. The parish council's role also includes initiating projects for the maintenance and repair of parish facilities, as well as consulting with the district council on the maintenance, repair, and improvement of highways, drainage, footpaths, public transport, and street cleaning. Conservation matters (including trees and listed buildings) and environmental issues are also the responsibility of the council.

For local government purposes, since 1 April 2023, the parish comes under the unitary authority of Somerset Council. Prior to this, it was part of the non-metropolitan district of South Somerset (established under the Local Government Act 1972). It was part of Yeovil Rural District before 1974.

It is also part of the Glastonbury and Somerton county constituency represented in the House of Commons of the Parliament of the United Kingdom. It elects one Member of Parliament (MP) by the first past the post system of election.

== Landmarks ==
The manor house on Church Green dates from 1613.

== Religious sites ==
The Church of St Mary can date its origins to before the Norman Conquest, however the present building largely dates from around 1360, with further rebuilding in the 15th century. It has been designated as a grade I listed building. The church was held by Polsloe Priory, near Exeter from the 12th century until the dissolution of the monasteries.

== In fiction ==
In the 1992 novel The English Patient, Marston Magna features as the home of the character Madox. In the novel, Madox travels by bus to the nearby town of Yeovil and commits suicide in an unnamed church there.

In the film of the book, the character is referred to in Anthony Minghella's screenplay as coming from the county of Dorset.
