= Martin Blake (clergyman) =

English vicar

Rev. Martin Blake, detail from the mural monument he erected to his young son Nicholas Blake (d.1634) in St Peter's Church, Barnstaple

Mural monument to Nicholas Blake (d.1634), 9 year-old son of Rev. Martin Blake, erected by his father in St Peter's Church, Barnstaple

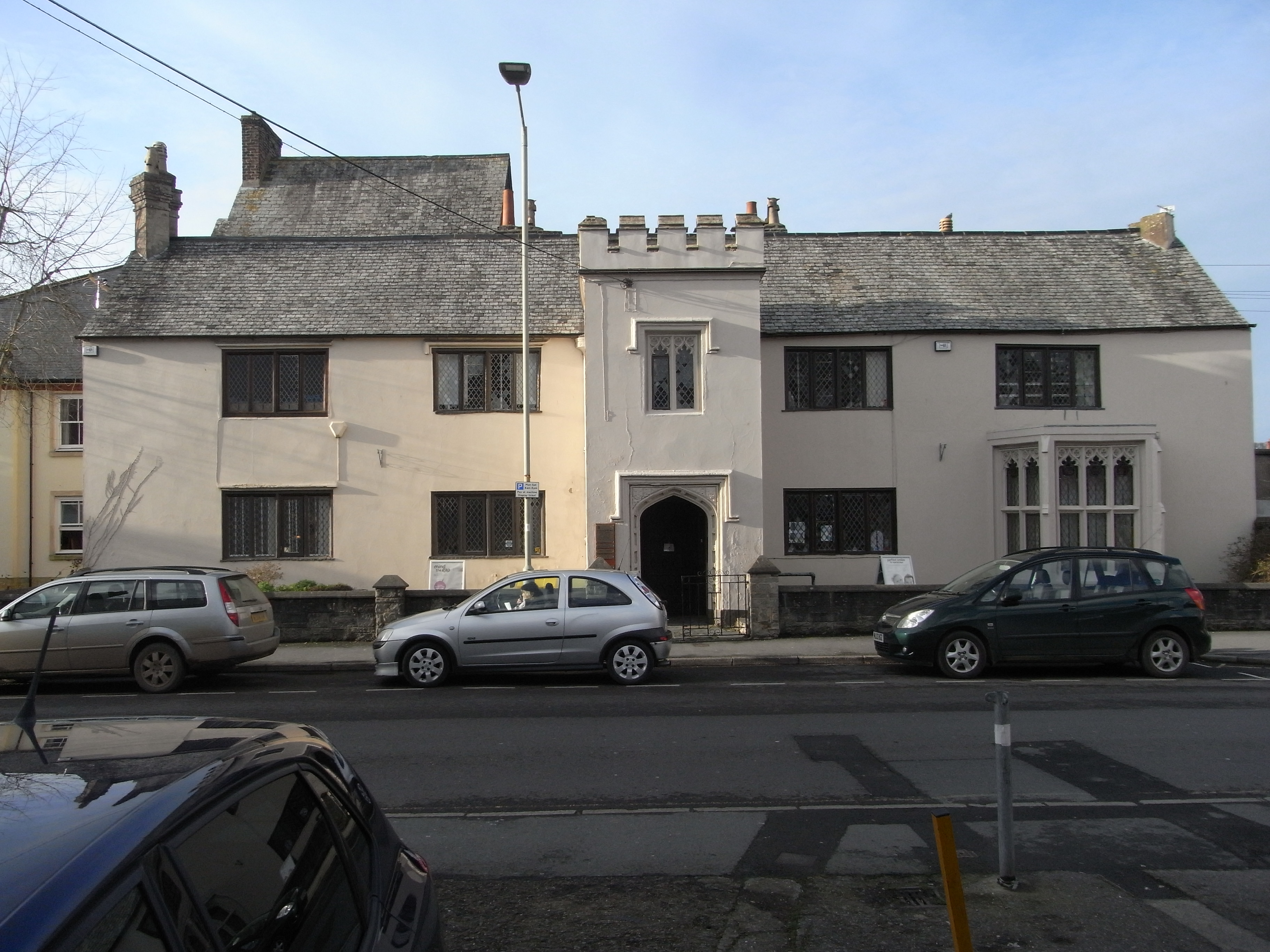
Old Vicarage, Barnstaple, built originally in 1311 at the entrance of Barnstaple Priory. The surviving building, entirely re-built "at his own great charge" by Rev Martin Blake (with 19th c. additions and restorations) today occupies the same site

Rev. Martin Blake (1593-1673) was vicar of Barnstaple in Devon, 1628–56; 1660–73, and suffered much for his adherence to the Royalist cause during the English Civil War, as related in John Walker's Sufferings of the Clergy (1714). According to Chanter (1882), "The eventful history of the Rev. Martin Blake has been often written in public history and local annals".

== Origins ==
This "learned and noted man" was born on 20 September 1593 in Plymouth, Devon, the second son of Nicholas Blake (1552-1645/6), merchant and Mayor of Plymouth in 1625, by his first wife Joan Goddard (d.1619) of Kingsbridge, Wiltshire.

== Career ==
He was educated at Plymouth Grammar School, founded in 1561 by, amongst others, a certain William Blake, probably his grandfather. He then went to Balliol College, Oxford, shortly after in 1611 transferring to Exeter College, Oxford, especially popular with Devonshire families, where he remained for eight years. He received his Batchelor's degree on 24 May 1614 and Masters on 25 February 1616. Shortly thereafter his elder brother William Blake died, and their father sought to recall Martin, now the eldest son and heir apparent, to the family business in Plymouth. Martin persuaded the Bishop of Oxford to ordain him Deacon, which put an end to his father's plans, and indeed won his approval. His father purchased for Martin the next presentations to the livings of the parishes of Fremington and King's Nympton in North Devon. At about this time, he met his future wife Elizabeth Delbridge, a younger daughter of John Delbridge of Barnstaple, merchant and a Member of Parliament for Barnstaple, whom he married in St Peter's Church, Barnstaple on 28 February 1619-20. At Oxford he was strongly influenced in his religious views by his brother-in-law Dr George Hakewill and by John Downe.

=== Vicar of Barnstaple ===
He was appointed Vicar of Barnstaple on 1 December 1628.

=== Civil War ===
He suffered much during the Civil War and Commonwealth for his adherence to the Royalist cause. During the Siege of Plymouth he wrote a letter to that town's mayor Philip Francis urging him to stay loyal to the king, and he was suspected by the mainly Parliamentarian townspeople of Barnstaple of having been instrumental in its capture by Royalists. He was thrice dispossessed of the living of Barnstaple, but was re-instated after the first two events, having been summoned to appear before various Parliamentarian committees. On one occasion he was seized by a party of cavalry and taken on "a bitter, stormy, winter day" to Exeter, 35 miles to the south-east. Tradition relates that on one of these occasions he was dragged from his pulpit in St Peter's Church whilst giving a sermon. He was finally reinstated following the Restoration of the Monarchy in 1660, and remained in office until his death in 1673.

A letter dated 12 October 1646 was sent on behalf of Blake by Richard Ferris, Mayor of Barnstaple, and other aldermen to Sir John Bampfylde, 1st Baronet (c.1610-1650) of Poltimore and North Molton and Tamerton Foliot, one of Devonshire's Parliamentarian leaders during the Civil War.

It was said by a certain George Fairchild, in a 1710 letter to Walker, that the favour occasionally shown by Parliament to Martin Blake was due to "General Blake", presumably Robert Blake (1598-1657), General at Sea, one of the most important military commanders of the Commonwealth, following the Civil War. It is unclear whether the two men were related.

== Rebuilds Barnstaple Vicarage ==
During the Civil War, Martin rebuilt "at his own great charge" the Vicarage House at Barnstaple, which survives today with 19th century additions and alterations, on the same site as the one built in 1311 by the Prior and Convent of Barnstaple Priory, at the entrance to the now demolished Priory.

== Paige bequest ==
The will of Gilbert Paige (c.1595-1647) of Crock Street, Barnstaple, and Rookabeare House in the adjoining parish of Fremington, Devon, a merchant who was twice Mayor of Barnstaple in 1629 and 1641, dated 1640, bequeathed to his "kinsman Master Martin Blacke the summe of two and twentie shillings, the residue of all my goods and chattailes whatsoever not before given and bequeathed".

== Allows monuments ==
Many of the surviving elaborate mural monuments in St Peter's Church, Barnstaple, were erected during Blake's tenure as vicar, for example those to Richard Ferris, Richard Beaple and Elizabeth Chichester (d. 18 December 1628), a daughter of John II Chichester (d.1608) of Hall, Bishop's Tawton and wife of Richard Delbridge, Blake's brother-in-law.

== Marriages and children ==
Blake married twice:

- Firstly on 28 February 1619-20 in St Peter's Church, Barnstaple, to Elizabeth Delbridge, a younger daughter of John Delbridge of Rumsum in the parish of Bishop's Tawton, near Barnstaple, a leading merchant, thrice Mayor of Barnstaple and a Member of Parliament for Barnstaple. She was the favoured choice of his mother shortly before her death. His children by his first wife included the following:
  - Nicholas Blake (1625-12 Feb.1634), second son, the principal subject of the monument, died aged 9.
  - William Blake, depicted with his sister Mary in a roundel on the left of the monument, as children both wearing white robes, each holding a martyr's palm-frond. Within the roundel is inscribed: sequuntur agnum ("they follow the Lamb (of God)")
  - John Blake (baptised 26 June 1631), youngest son, the only son who survived his father. Mayor of Barnstaple in 1686. He married on 4 January 1665/6 at Barnstaple, his cousin Mary Downe, elder daughter of Rev. Richard Downe, Rector of Tawstock, near Barnstaple, by his wife Mary Lovet, a daughter of Sir Robert Lovet of Corfe in the parish of Tawstock and of Liscombe in the parish of Soulbury in Buckinghamshire, and sister of Anne Lovet, second wife of Edward Bourchier, 4th Earl of Bath of Tawstock Court. By his wife he had three sons and two daughters.
  - Mary Blake (1621–22), eldest child, born at Barnstaple, died as an infant aged one.
  - Elizabeth Blake, born at King's Nympton 22 January 1623, baptised at Barnstaple. She is depicted with her sister Agnes in a roundel on the right of the monument, as children both wearing white robes, each holding a martyr's palm-frond. Within the roundel is inscribed: non esurie(n)t amplius neq(ue) sitient (Book of Revelation 7:16, "they shall hunger no more, neither thirst any more")
  - Agnes Blake
  - Joan Blake (baptised 17 May 1635 died Sept 1651), died aged 17.
- Secondly on 10 March 1648/9 at Taunton, he married Mary Harris, a daughter of Richard Harris of Barnstaple and widow of George Musgrave of Nettlecombe and North Petherton in Somerset.

== Monument to son ==
In 1634 Blake erected the surviving mural monument in St Peter's Church, Barnstaple, to his nine-year-old son Nicholas Blake (d.1634) and other children, but "as much in allusion to his own position and sufferings", described by Chanter (1882) as "perhaps the most noteworthy and interesting monument in the church", "not only a work of art, but of allegorical literature and imagination, telling its tale as fully in its medallions, cartouches and sculptured mottoes as if written - an actual instance of 'sermons in stone'".

== Death and burial ==
He died and was buried at Barnstaple in September 1673.

== Surviving writings ==
His surviving writings include:

- The humble apologie of Martin Blake a minister of God in & for the town of Barnstaple, toward the cleering of himselfe from some aspersions cast upon him, in reference to these unhappy tymes, folio 176, Walker.
- A short relation of my long premeditated & late acted troubles, folio 343, Walker.
- Humble petition of Martin Blake to the Committee for Plundered Ministers, folio 371, Walker.
