= Barnstaple Priory =

Former priory in Devon, England

Coordinates: 51.088473°N 4.062436°W

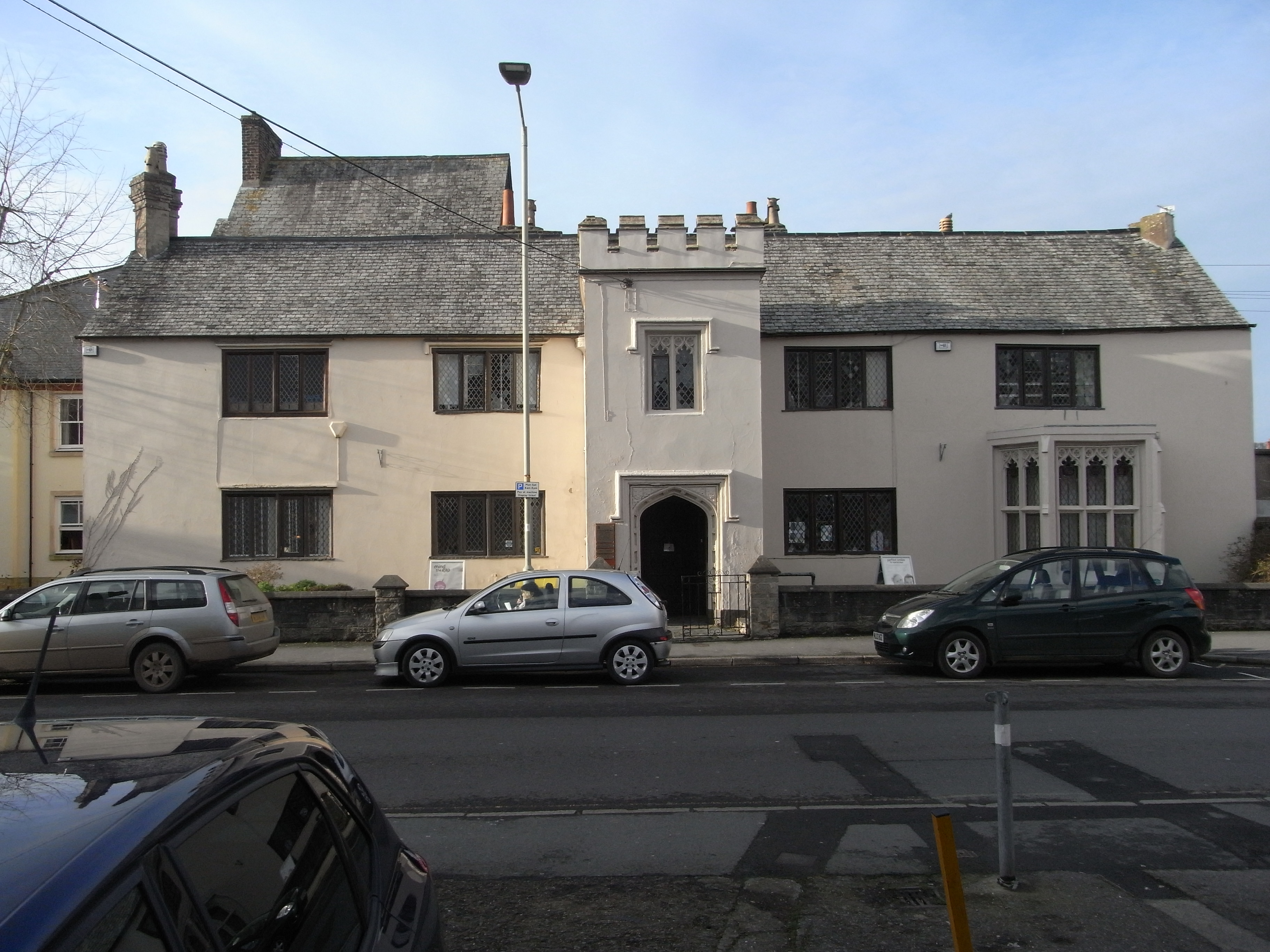
Old Vicarage, Barnstaple, built originally in 1311 "at the entrance of the Priory". The surviving building, entirely re-built "at his own great charge" by Rev Martin Blake (d.1673), Vicar of Barnstaple, (with 19th c. additions and restorations) today occupies the same site

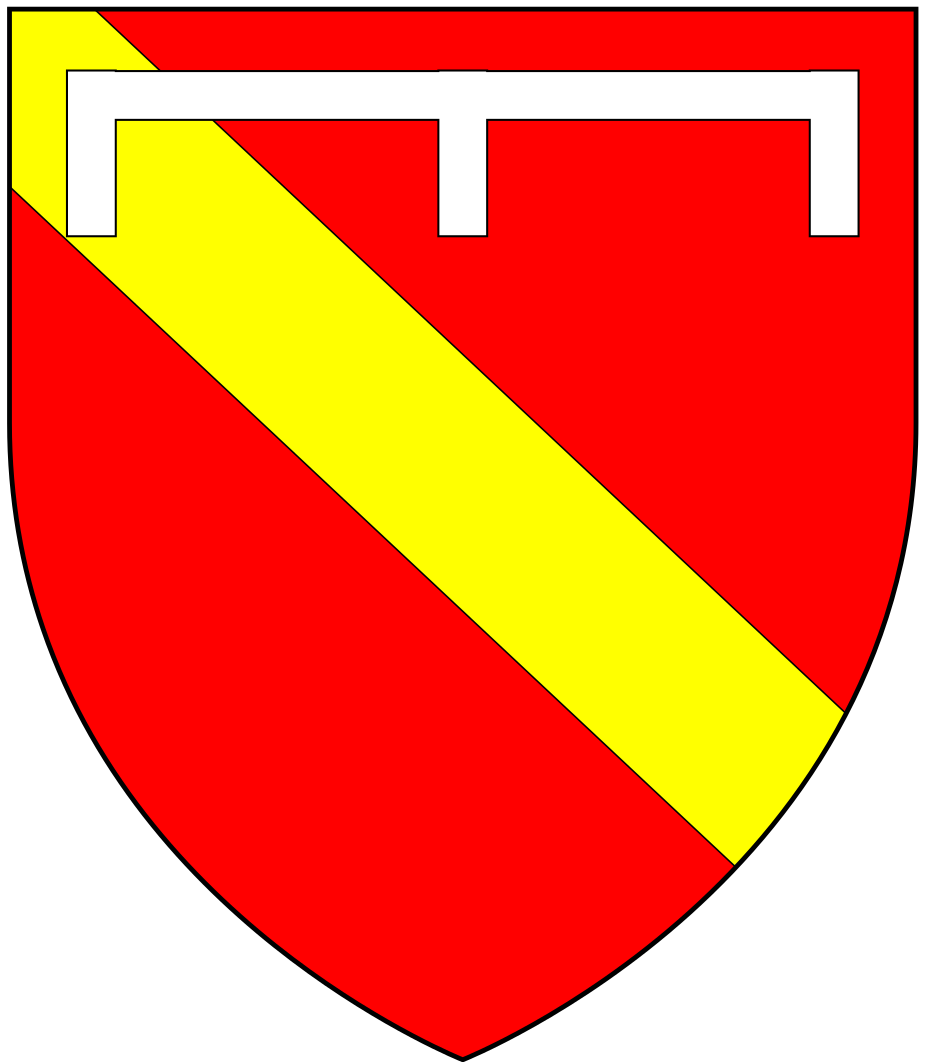
Arms of Barnstaple Priory: Gules, a bend or in chief a label of three points argent

The Priory of St Mary Magdalene in Barnstaple was a priory in Devon, England. It was founded in about 1107 by Juhel de Totnes, feudal baron of Barnstaple, who had earlier founded Totnes Priory in about 1087 at the caput of his former feudal barony of Totnes, from which he had been expelled. Barnstaple Priory was of the Cluniac order. It was dedicated to St Mary Magdalene. It was situated on land outside the town walls stretching from the North Gate to the East Gate with the River Yeo forming its northern boundary. Nearby to the north across the River Yeo was the Benedictine Pilton Priory of St Mary the Virgin, a cell of Malmesbury Abbey, founded slightly later, between 1107 and 1199.

== Endowments ==
Juhel endowed it with part of the demesne land of Barnstaple Castle as well as with the manors of Pilton and Pilland, members of the barony, which were contiguous and situated immediately to the north across the River Yeo. The exact grant stated in the charter was one virgate of land in each manor, which comprised exactly one half of their total areas as recorded in Domesday Book of 1086. It appears that the other virgate within each manor was later granted to Pilton Priory, and Barnstaple's share of Pilland became known as Bradiford. The grant within Pilton included the wood, waters and meadows, with fishing rights on the rivers Taw and Yeo. Also granted was Barnstaple town mill at which the inhabitants were required by their tenure to grind their corn, a valuable source of revenue to the Priory. Also granted to the new priory were the Church of St Peter, Barnstaple, with all its appurtenances, which was the Saxon church in the town of Barnstaple, and today the parish church, and the Chapel of St Sabinus, which is not identifiable today but which may have been located in the crypt of the surviving St Anne's Chapel, next to the parish church. Juhel stated in his foundation charter that he intended himself to enter the priory as a monk and hoped "quickly to pass to the glory of my maker".

== Dissolution ==
Following the Dissolution of the Monasteries the priory was leased by King Henry VIII, later granted absolutely, to William Howard, 1st Baron Howard of Effingham (c. 1510-1573), the eldest son of Thomas Howard, 2nd Duke of Norfolk. Its lands and possessions remained in the Howard family until 1609 when the lands in Pilton and Bradiford started to be sold piecemeal by William Howard, Lord Howard of Effingham (1577–1615), with the larger holdings being purchased by Henry Rolle (1545–1625) of Stevenstone.

== Barnstaple vicarage house ==
The Vicarage House at Barnstaple was erected originally in 1311, "at the entrance of the Priory", by the Prior and Convent. During the Civil War the surviving building (in 2018 used as a dentist's surgery) was "built new from the ground" on the same site and "at his own great charge" by Rev Martin Blake (d.1673), Vicar of Barnstaple 1628-56; 1660–73, who notably suffered much for his adherence to the Royalist cause as related in John Walker's Sufferings of the Clergy (1714). It includes much 19th c. additions and restorations, undertaken by Rev. Henry Luxmore (born 1793, Bridestowe, Devon), Vicar of Barnstaple 1820-60 and by his successor Rev. Gilbert Innes Wallas, Vicar 1861-77.

== Sources ==
- Lamplugh, L., Barnstaple: Town on the Taw, 2002, Cullompton
- Reed, Margaret A., Pilton: its Past and its People, Barnstaple, 1985
