= St Mary's Church, Marston Magna =

Church in Somerset, England

Church of St Mary
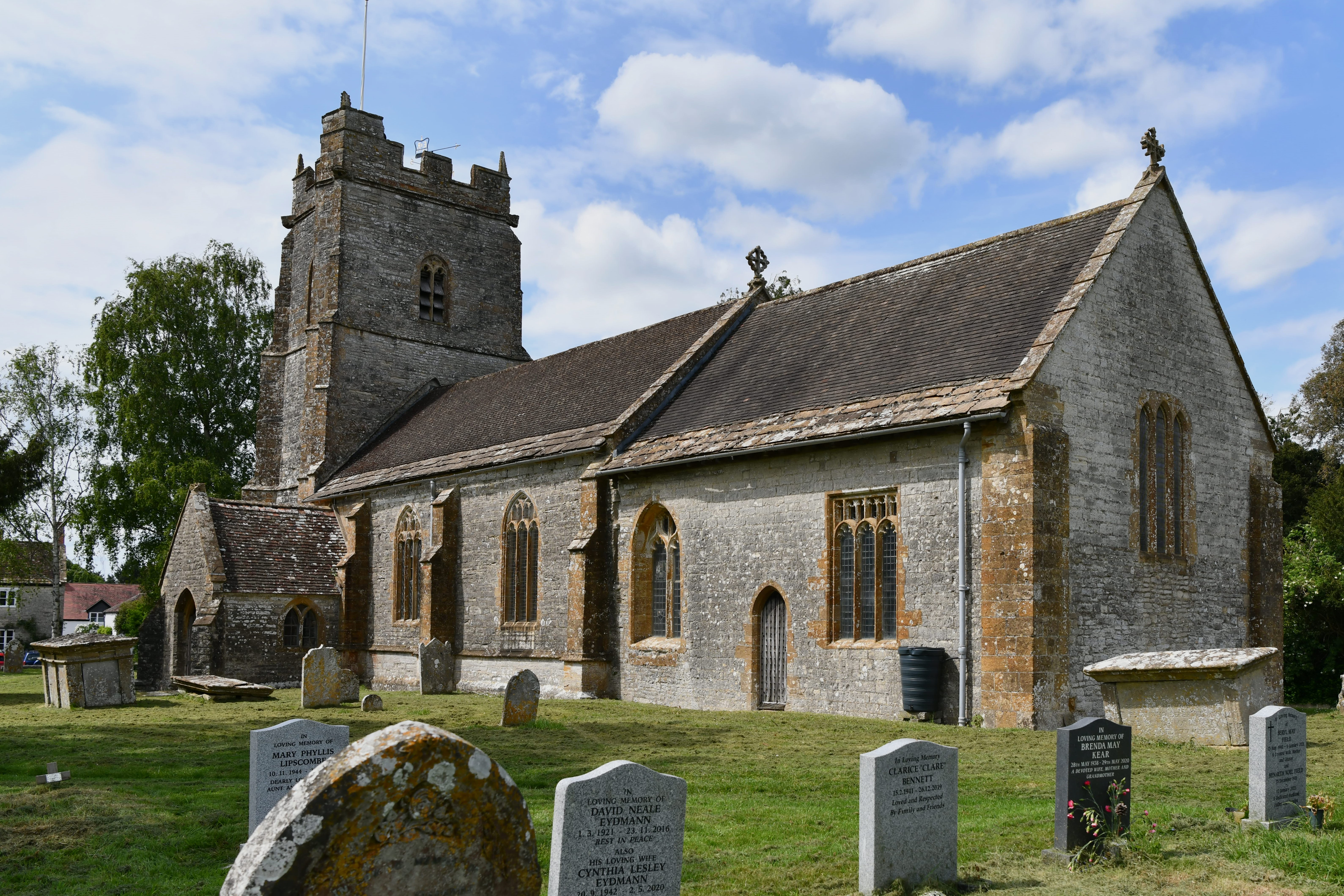
- Church of St Mary in 2026

- Location within Somerset
- 50°59′55″N 2°34′46″W
- Location: Marston Magna, Somerset, England

History
- Built: c. 1360

Listed Building – Grade I
- Official name: Church of St Mary
- Designated: 19 April 1961
- Reference no.: 1296098

The Church of St Mary in Marston Magna, Somerset, England can date its origins to before the Norman Conquest, however the present building largely dates from around 1360, with further rebuilding in the 15th century. It has been designated as a grade I listed building.

The church was held by Polsloe Priory, near Exeter from the 12th century until the dissolution of the monasteries.

There are two small windows heads on each side of the central arch which remain from the Saxon church which once stood on the site, and the north wall, which includes herringbone masonry, and the font are Norman. The triple lancet east window dates from around 1230, although the glass is Victorian. The Lady Chapel is from the 15th century, as is the oak screen below the west gallery and rood screen.

The three stage tower has a stair turret on the south east corner leading to the belfry, which is surmounted by battlements, crocheted pinnacles and gargoyles. The vestry in the base of the tower includes a clock by William Monk, who also made the clock in Sherborne Abbey, and dating from 1710. The bells were dedicated in 1912 when new land was added to the churchyard at the expense of the governors of Winchester College.

== See also ==
- List of Grade I listed buildings in South Somerset
- List of towers in Somerset
- List of ecclesiastical parishes in the Diocese of Bath and Wells
