= Polsloe =

Suburb of Exeter, Devon, England

Coordinates: 50°43′47″N 3°30′28″W

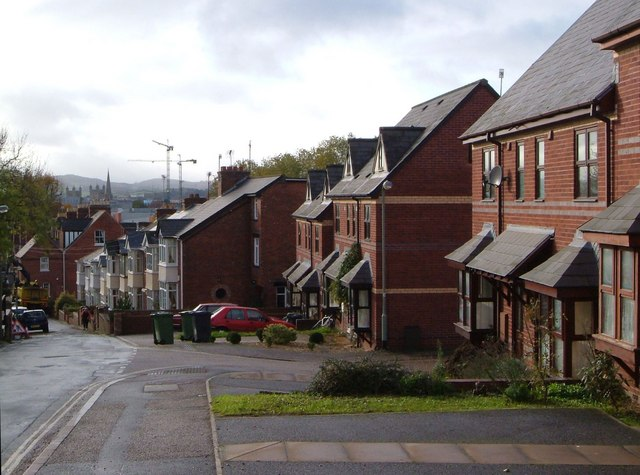
The view from Polsloe Road down Jesmond Road towards Exeter city centre. The twin towers of the cathedral are visible in the distance.

Polsloe is a suburb of the city of Exeter in Devon, England. It lies to the east of the city centre and is served by Polsloe Bridge railway station.

The name Polsloe is derived from Poll's marsh, named after Poll, the owner of land here at the time of the Domesday Book. The Benedictine priory, Polsloe Priory was founded here in around 1159.

In 1899 the Exeter Brick and Tile Company built a factory on land that formerly belonged to the priory. The factory was capable of making 100,000 bricks each week, taking advantage of a nearby band of red clay which is particularly well-suited to such use.

The main road in this suburb is Polsloe Road which runs north from Heavitree Road to Blackboy Road which leads out to Whipton. Polsloe Road follows the line of an Iron Age ridgeway track that ran from the River Exe towards Stoke Hill. Until the 19th century the road was known as Workhouse Road after the Heavitree Workhouse.

Until boundary changes came into effect in 2016, Polsloe was a ward. In 2001 the population of the ward of Polsloe was 6,197, making it the 7th most populous out of 18 wards in the city. The population increased to 6,786 at the 2011 census.
