= Holme Priory =

Coordinates: 50.673251°N 2.144031°W

Holme Priory, also known as East Holne Priory, was a priory in Dorset, England.

== 12th century ==
The priory of Holme, or Holne as it was anciently called, a cell of the Cluniac priory of Montacute in Somerset, was founded towards the middle of the twelfth century by Robert de Lincoln, the son of Alured de Lincoln. The founder, in his charter for the endowment of the new establishment, recites that 'moved by divine instinct to build a house of religion in honour of God' he has given to God and the church of St. Peter of Montacute and the monks serving God there his land which is called Holne, in perpetual alms for the maintenance of thirteen monks, the gift being made with the concurrence of Beuza his wife and Alured his son, by the counsel and consent of the bishop of Salisbury, in the presence of the prior and monks of Montacute, and of Gilbert the monk, 'to whom I afterwards personally gave the place,' for the souls of King Henry, of the donor's father and mother, of himself, his wife, and children, relations, and friends. The original endowment also consisted of three virgates of land at Weston Worth (Wrda) in Purbeck, a tithe of the bread, meat, and fish provided for the use of his household (de dispensa domus mee) and that of his heirs, a salt-pan of the salt works adjacent to his manor of Langton, with tithes of his demesne at Okeford Fitzpaine, at Winterborne Whitchurch, Langton near Abbotsbury, and Corton in Portisham, besides tithes of the demesne at Cheselbourne and Watercombe, the gift of Bardolph 'my knight.' Alured, the founder's son, added to the gifts of his father and confirmed all former grants, stating that they were bestowed in free alms, quit of all suit and service save of celebrating divine offices for the soul of the founder, of his ancestors and successors, and of all the faithful departed.

== 13th century ==
An inquisition, held in June 1281, as to the lands and tenements of the prior of Montacute in the isle of Purbeck reported that these were extended to the value of £16 6s. 2d., and included, besides the advowson of the church of Holme, valued at 60s., a garden and curtilage with 34 acres of arable land, 40 acres of meadow, a turbary, fish-pond, fixed rents (reddit' assis') of the villeins, their works, pleas, perquisites, fines of land and heriots within the manor of Holme. The Taxatio of 1291 gives the priory an income only of £5 10s. 8d., the spiritualities, amounting to £2 13s. 8d., derived from pensions from the following churches:—Puddletown, Warmwell, Corton, Langton Herring, and Powerstock; the temporalities were valued at £2 17s., of which £2 1s. 8d. came from Weston Worth in Purbeck.

== 14th century ==
As a cell subordinate to an alien house, Holme was constantly in the hands of the crown during the Hundred Years' War. On 8 October 1324, the farm of the lands of the prior of Montacute in Holme and Plush was committed by Edward II to Walter Beril and Roger de Blokkesworthe until the superior had found sufficient security to satisfy the King, after which they were ordered to amove their hand. Edward III, shortly after his accession, made a general restoration to the abbot of Cluny of all his lands and possessions in England, but they were subsequently re-seized, and in 1337 the prior of Holme was ordered to pay a fine of six marks and 40s. for the custody of his priory. In 1339 Edward III granted to William de Montacute, earl of Salisbury and his heirs the advowson of the Priory of Montacute, with the custody whenever it should be seized into the king's hand by reason of the war with France, and at the earl's petition the following year he added on similar terms the advowson and custody of Carswell, Holme, St. Carric, and Malpas, cells pertaining to the said priory 'from the time of which memory does not exist.'

== 15th century ==
One of the earliest acts of Henry IV on his accession was to restore, among others, the alien priory of Montacute with its subject cells, remitting the farm lately paid to the king and his heirs or, by virtue of a former grant, to the earl of Salisbury and his heirs, and reserving only the payment of the ancient 'apport,' paid in time of peace to the head house. The prior in 1407, by the payment of a sum of 300 marks, obtained a charter of denization for his house, which made the priory, with all its possessions, advowsons, etc., indigenous of England, and provided that its superior should be elected by the convent without collation or institution of the abbot of Cluny. Holme continued up to the Dissolution as a dependent cell with a prior 'dative and removable' by the head house.

== Management ==
Though ordained by the founder for the maintenance of thirteen monks, there appears from early times to have been a considerable decline from the original design. The inquisition held in 1281 declared that the prior of Montacute held the church and manor of Holme subject to the charge of finding four monks to sing for the soul of Alured de Lincoln, his progenitors and successors. Two years previous to that the priors of Mont Didier in France and Lenton in England, appointed by the abbot of Cluny, in 1279, to visit English houses of the order, found here two monks and a prior, while a fifteenth-century description, probably drawn up from visitation reports of 1298, 1390, and 1405, stated that the community consisted of a prior and two monks. Leland, in the sixteenth century, said that the four cells belonging to Montacute had only two monks each.

With regard to the internal condition and management of the house, the visitors appointed in 1279 reported that the inmates lived well and commendably according to the rule, fulfilling their religious duties as far as the exigencies of the place permitted and the limited number of the community. The prior, who had been in office for three years, had taken over the house burdened with a debt of twenty marks, which he had managed to pay off, and it was now free of debt. The buildings and church were in good repair, and there was a sufficient store to last till the following harvest. The Cluniac order being exempt from episcopal jurisdiction and visitation by the ordinary the Salisbury registers throw no light on the history of the house, but various references are made to it in other records. In January 1331, a commission of oyer and terminer was issued on the complaint of the abbot of Bindon against John de Montacute, sometime abbot of Bindon, who, both before and after his deposition, proved such a source of trouble to his house; in his quarrel with his own community he seems to have enlisted the active support of the then prior of Holme, Walter de Welham, at all events the two, with others, were accused of breaking into the abbey by night, driving away cattle, and carrying off books, vessels, and ornaments of the church, together with the conventual seal, which they further proceeded to append to various documents to the prejudice of the community. In 1348 a certain Ralph de Midelneye was charged with having acquired from the same prior, Walter de Welham, then deceased, certain premises in Winterborne Wast, Bockhampton, and Swanage, and having entered on the same without obtaining a licence of the king. Edward III, in 1344, directed the mayor and bailiffs of Dover to permit Gerard de Noiale, prior of Holme, to cross the Channel in order to visit the Roman court 'for the correction of his soul.'

== 16th century ==
The Valor of 1535 states that John Wales was then prior of this cell, valued at £16 9s. 4d., and on the surrender of Montacute Priory on 20 March 1539, the same John was appointed to serve the cure of Holme with a stipend of £8; in the event of his being 'impotente and lame' and past work he should receive a pension of £5 13s. 4d. The house and site of the dissolved cell were granted by Henry VIII to Richard Hamper for a term of twenty-one years; Edward VI, in the first year of his reign, bestowed the reversion of the property on the duke of Somerset and his heirs. By the attainder of the duke the estate reverted again to the crown, by whom it was granted to John Hannam of Wimborne Minster, in whose family it remained till the reign of William and Mary, when it came into the Bond family.

== See also ==
- East Holme
- List of monastic houses in Dorset

== Sources ==
- Page, William, ed. (1908). "The Priory of Holne or East Holme". A History of the County of Dorset. Vol. 2. London: A. Constable, Ltd. pp. 80–82.
