= Ipplepen Priory =

Former priory in Devon, England

Coordinates: 50.487876°N 3.639565°W

Ipplepen Priory was an Augustinian monastic house in the English village of Ipplepen in the county of Devon.

The priory was founded in circa 1143 AD and it was dependent upon the Abbey of St Pierre de Rille, near Fougères in France.

Ipplepen Priory is mentioned in a Bishop's register of 1274 AD and it was dissolved circa 1414 AD.

== See also ==
- List of monastic houses in Devon
