= Exeter monastery =

Collection of religious buildings in England

Coordinates: 50.7217°N 3.5299°W

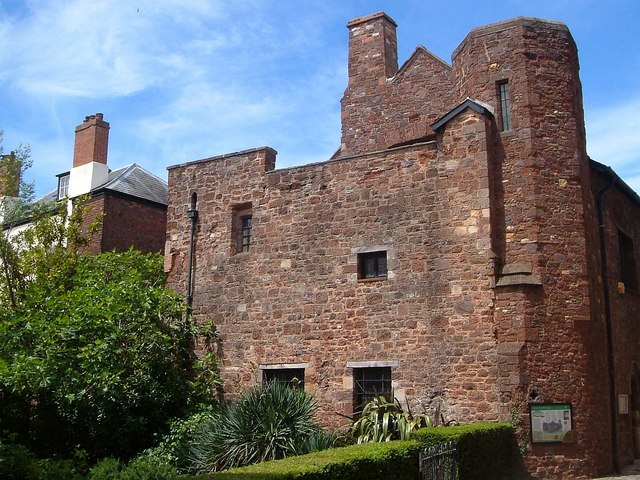
St Nicholas' Priory, Exeter, the remains of part of a Benedictine monastery.

Various monasteries and other religious houses have existed at various times during the Middle Ages in the city of Exeter, Devon, England.

== Monastic buildings ==
The monastic buildings in Exeter included:

Anglo-Saxon foundations

- The Priory Church of the Blessed Virgin Mary and Saint Peter – a late 7th-century Saxon minster or monastery, possibly founded before c. 690. It was established on the site of a Roman basilica in what is now Cathedral Yard. The basilica had been built on the site of a Roman bath house.
- John Hoker writes of a convent of monks, sometimes called the Saxon monastery, dedicated to St. Mary and St. Peter. It was founded by King Æthelred of Wessex in 868 on the site of the present cathedral. It was soon abandoned due to fears of Viking attacks, but restored by King Edgar in 968. It was destroyed by Sweyn Forkbeard's invasion of 1003 and abandoned, but restored again by Canute in c. 1019.
- The Abbey Church of St Mary and St Peter, a Benedictine monastery, founded in 932 by King Æthelstan and dedicated to Saint Mary and Saint Peter. It was located on the site of the existing Priory Church. The building was eventually replaced by the Church of St Mary Major, Exeter.
- The Nunnery of Saint Augustine, a nunnery of Augustinian Canonesses founded circa 968, on what later became Exeter's Cathedral close

Norman and later foundations

- The Benedictine Priory of St Nicholas, a Benedictine monastery founded in 1087
- St James Priory, a Cluniac priory founded in 1146
- Polsloe Priory, a Benedictine priory for women (a nunnery) founded circa 1159
- Exeter Blackfriars, a Dominican priory founded before 1232
- Exeter Greyfriars, a Franciscan friary founded before 1240
- Exeter Priory, a Carthusian priory licensed in 1331–2 but never established

== History ==
The origins of monasticism in Exeter are uncertain. Christianity arrived in Britain when Exeter was still a Roman city and the area's military and civic capital. However, the end of Roman rule in Britain led to the city being nearly abandoned for over 400 years. During the Post-Roman period it was part of the Romano-British kingdom of Dumnonia. Celtic Christianity was introduced to the area during the fifth century by Welsh, Irish and Breton missionaries and a church and cemetery are thought to have existed on the site of the present Exeter Cathedral at this time. The defeat of the British in 682 by King Centwine of Wessex allowed the Saxons to reach Exeter, and in the late seventh century the church appears to have become a monastery under abbot Wulfhard. The Saxons gave the name Monkton to Exeter as a consequence of the large number of monks that it contained. According to Willibald, an Anglo-Saxon priest who wrote a "Life" of Saint Boniface, the saint was educated at a monastery in 690 in a place variously called Adestancester, Escancastre, or Examchester, names that have been identified with Exeter.

During the tenth century the population of Exeter grew to around 2,000 and the monastery was re-founded as a minster church by King Æthelstan in c. 930. The foundations of the minster were discovered in 1971 under the parish church of St Mary Major when it was demolished. King Edgar reintroduced monks to the city in 968 under the rule of Bishop Sideman, the Bishop of Crediton. A monastic revival was encouraged by the king during his reign and he identified Exeter as a place suitable for monks to join the clergy. Exeter was sacked by the Danes in 1003, but the Benedictine monastery was restored by Cnut in 1019.

Bishop Leofric was appointed as Bishop of Cornwall and Bishop of Crediton in 1046. In 1050 he merged the two bishoprics to create the united see of Devon and Cornwall and moved the episcopal see to Exeter. The new combined see incorporated Exeter's three monastic buildings of the time, all of which were located in Saint Peter's Close. The nunnery of Saint Augustine, the Saxon monastery and the Benedictine monastery were united to form the Cathedral Church. The monastery was suppressed and converted into a secular cathedral.

During the subsequent two centuries a number of priories and friaries were founded. These were all dissolved with the Dissolution of the Monasteries under Henry VIII and little remains. There is one building surviving from Polsloe Priory: the main part of the west range, built of the local red sandstone and believed to date from around 1320. Nothing is extant from St James Priory except a cob wall surrounding the building currently on the site, which may be the precinct wall of the priory. Parts of the Benedictine Priory of St Nicholas survive. The guest wing and a kitchen at its northern end were converted into an Elizabethan town house after dissolution, and this is now maintained as St Nicholas' Priory museum by Exeter City Council. The refectory was used as a Georgian town house and is now owned by the Exeter Historic Buildings Trust.

== See also ==
- List of monastic houses in Devon
