= East Holme =

Village and civil parish in Dorset, England

Coordinates: 50.6726°N 2.1481°W

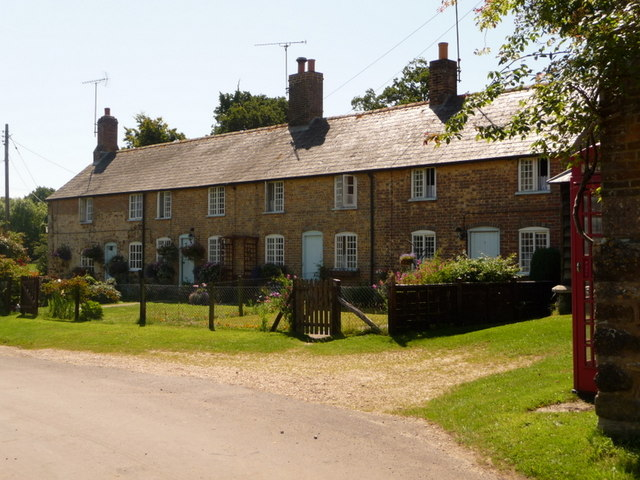
- East Holme

- Location within Dorset
- Population: 50
- OS grid reference: SY895860
- Unitary authority: Dorset
- Ceremonial county: Dorset
- Region: South West
- Country: England
- Sovereign state: United Kingdom
- Post town: Wareham
- Postcode district: BH20
- Police: Dorset
- Fire: Dorset and Wiltshire
- Ambulance: South Western
- UK Parliament: South Dorset

East Holme is a small village and civil parish situated about halfway between Wool and Wareham in Dorset, England. The village is sprawled around a large house called Holme Priory. In 2013 the estimated population of the civil parish was 50.

The South West Main Line from London Waterloo to Weymouth runs through the village and, although the train does not stop, the village contains one of only a few of the remaining staffed gate crossings. These have become particularly rare in the area.

== Parish church ==
East Holme is also fortunate to contain the church of St, John the Evangelist standing rather apart from the rest of the village, which was built in 1865. The footpath across the park to the church is signposted and crosses in front of the priory, a fine late 18th century house, built on the site of a former, small Cluniac priory.

Following the dissolution the Priory church survived as the parish church until 1715. A new parish church was built in 1865 to the designs of John Hicks, and is one of his more elaborate churches. Now it has a faintly seedy air, which somehow suits this fine example of high Victorian taste. Built from local materials - dark brown hearthstone quarried close by, With a Purbeck limestone roof, and Purbeck Marble shafts inside.

The painted decoration inside the church is by Miss Selina Bond.

== See also ==
- Holme Priory
