= Loders Priory =

Priory in Dorset, England

Coordinates: 50.745865°N 2.722539°W

Loders Priory was a priory in Loders, Dorset, England.

== History ==
This alien priory, cell to St. Mary of Montebourg, was founded about the beginning of the twelfth century in connexion with the manor which Richard de Redvers had given to the Norman abbey, said to be of his foundation. Henry I by charter confirmed the grant and testified to Roger, bishop of Salisbury, 1107—37, and Aiulf the Chamberlain (sheriff of Dorset), that for the souls of his father and mother, of himself, his wife and children, and all his relations, he had granted to the abbey of Montebourg and Urse its abbot that the manor of Loders, which Richard de Redvers had given by his permission, should be assessed at five hides henceforth and for ever both in geld and other dues. (Note: Cal. Doc. France, 313.) Baldwin, earl of Exeter, confirming the gifts of his father to the abbey, which was to be wholly quit of all dues to the donor and his heirs, specifies the manor of Loders with all its appurtenances and the church, in Dorset, and the manor, appurtenances, and church of Axmouth, in Devonshire; (Note: Ibid. 316.) these are included in the charter of Henry II ratifying to the abbey the previous gifts of the reputed founder and his family. (Note: Dugdale, Mon. vi, 1097. Among other grants to the abbey by Henry II was one directing that the house, which was under his protection, should enjoy all such liberties and dues as it enjoyed in the time of his father; and another stating that the abbot and monks should be free of toll and passage and of all dues wheresoever they should go or whatever they should buy, provided it should be for the use of the monks. Cal. Doc. France 319.)

Besides the church of Loders the abbot of Montebourg held in Dorset before the end of the twelfth century the chapel of St. Andrew of Bradpole, the gift of William de Moreville; (Note: Ibid. 316.) the church of Powerstock, the gift of Roger Arundel; (Note: Chart. of Salisbury in Twelfth and Thirteenth Cent. (Rolls Ser.), 26.) and the church of Fleet granted by Hawysia Redvers, the sister of Earl Richard, (Note: Ibid. 28.) the last two being confirmed by Jocelin, bishop of Salisbury, in 1157. (Note: Ibid. 29.) About the year 1215 the abbot and convent of St. Mary, Montebourg, released to Bishop Herbert Poor and the chapter of Salisbury their churches of Powerstock and Fleet, (Note: Reg. St. Osmund. (Rolls Ser.), i, 225.) and by a mutual arrangement were allowed to retain the church of Loders and chapel of Bradpole as a prebend in Salisbury, thereby entitling the foreign superior to a stall in the cathedral choir and a voice in the chapter. (Note: Ibid. 226.) In the Taxatio of 1291 this prebend of Loders 'with the chapel' was assessed at £20, the vicarage at £5, (Note: Pope Nich. Tax. (Rec. Com.), 181b.) the temporalities of the prior of Loders within the parish were reckoned at £26. (Note: Ibid. 183b.) A commission was appointed on 18 October 1313, to investigate a complaint of the prior that John, rector of St. Mary's church in the neighbouring town of Bridport, had carried away his goods at Bradpole. (Note: Pat. 7 Edw. II, pt. 1, m. 11d.)

The external history of Loders as an alien dependency follows very closely that of Frampton, with which it is frequently coupled during the period of the French wars. On its seizure by John in 1204, together with the property of other Norman landowners in England, the land was reported to be worth £33 unstocked, with the stock £40. (Note: Rot. Norman. (Hardy), 124.) The sheriff the following year was ordered to restore to Prior Baldwin full possession of his property 'which he holds of the abbot of Montebourg,' for which he had given two palfreys to the king with a promise to pay whatever he had formerly paid to the abbot, and not to transport any goods abroad without licence. (Note: Rot. de Finibus 1199–1215 (Hardy), 313.)

The prior received from Edward I in 1294, 1295, and 1297 letters of protection with licence to retain the custody of his goods on the same terms and under the same circumstances as the prior of Frampton. (Note: Pat. 22 Edw. I, m. 8; 24 Edw. I, m. 21; 25 Edw. I, m. 12d.) On the seizure of alien property by Edward II in 1324 his goods within the manor of Loders and Bothenhampton, taken into custody from 8 October to 28 December, were valued at £99 1s. 3d., (Note: Mins. Accts. bdle. 1125, No. 7.) the extent of the yearly value of his lands was returned at £54 8s. 5½d.; the church of Loders, which the monks held in proprios usus, a prebend of Salisbury, was worth £24; the advowson of the vicarage 100s., and of the vicarage of Bradpole £10. (Note: B.M. Add. MS. 6164, fol. 270.) On the eve of a threatened invasion of the French in the autumn of 1326 the bishop advised the king that in accordance with his mandate he had caused Ralph Pothyn of Loders Priory, a foreigner, to be transferred to the abbey of Sherborne as further removed from the coast. (Note: Sarum Epis. Reg. Mortival, i, fol. 236.)

The outbreak of war in 1337 resulted in the priory being again taken into the hands of the king, who restored it to the prior, 3 August, on condition that he should pay 10 marks and a yearly farm of £70 for the custody, (Note: Close, 11 Edw. III, pt. 2, m. 37.) the payment of this amount superseding all other dues. The possessions of the priory at Loders and Bothenhampton, with the custody of which the sheriff had been charged, were valued at £52 2s. and £34 17s. (Note: Mins. Accts. bdle. 1125, No. 9. An inventory of the household goods of the cell, including beds or rather uno lecto xx^{s}, is informing as to the internal equipment of a small religious house. Ibid.) An interesting record under the year 1339 states that the king wrote to the bishop of Winchester cancelling his order for the removal of the prior of Appledurcombe in the Isle of Wight and two of his monks from their priory near the sea coast to Hyde Abbey, owing to the war with France, desiring that they should be transferred instead to the house of the prior of Loders within the cathedral close of Salisbury, 'which is further still from the sea.' (Note: Rot. Aleman. 13 Edw. III, m. 6d. On the other hand the prior of Loders and the heads of other alien cells as well as of native houses were ordered in 1338 to repair to manors nearer the sea in order to defend the coast from attack. Rymer, Foedera (Rec. Com.), ii (2), 1062.)

Events in 1343 throw some light on a common enough feature of most dependent cells: the state of subjection in which the house was kept by the foreign superior. The bishop, we may note, beyond instituting the prior appointed by the abbot and convent of Montebourg and receiving official notification of his withdrawal, neither exercised nor attempted to exercise any jurisdiction in the priory; the check placed that year on the arbitrary methods of the abbot came from the king, who in February wrote to the sheriff that whereas he had committed to brother Roger, prior of Loders, an alien, the custody of his house for a certain farm, the abbot, his superior, on the false suggestion of the death of the prior had committed the management to another monk, and was endeavouring forcibly to remove the former contrary to the appointment made by the king, who forbade any such substitution to be allowed. (Note: Close, 17 Edw. III, pt. 1, m. 27d. This order was addressed to the escheator in the Isle of Wight for the benefit of Roger Hariel, prior of Appledurcombe, as well as to the sheriff of Somerset and Devon for Roger, prior of Loders, who appear to be one and the same person, as Roger Hariel was certainly appointed to Loders in 1320 and occurs here in 1344 and later.) The following year Roger Hariel, prior of Loders, obtained from the pope an indult that he should not be removed from the priory without reasonable cause, (Note: Cal. Pap. Letters, iii, 116. In February, 1346, he received as prior of Loders another indult to choose a confessor. Ibid. iii, 210.) and as the next presentation does not occur until 1361 he seems to have made good his position. This is the nearest approach to any hint as to the internal condition of the house that can be discovered.

An inquisition held at Bridport the Wednesday after the Feast of the Annunciation, 1387, states that the possessions of the priory in the parish of Loders at that date were worth £70 and at Axmouth, Devonshire, £30. (Note: Add. MS. 6164, fol. 506.) Richard II, in the early part of 1399, bestowed the house with all its appurtenances, rendering a yearly farm of £80 to the crown, on the Carthusian priory of St. Anne by Coventry, (Note: Pat. 22 Ric. II, pt. 3, m. 4.) but the grant can barely have taken effect, for in November, almost immediately after his accession, Henry IV restored it to its former owners in the person of the prior, Sampson Trigal, (Note: Ibid. 1 Hen. IV, pt. 2, m. 13.) the grant being confirmed to William Burnell, collated to the priory in March 1401. (Note: Ibid. 2 Hen. IV, pt. 3, m. 20.) On the final suppression of alien houses in 1414 Henry V made over the possessions of this cell to the abbess and convent of the nunnery of Syon, which he had founded in the manor of Isleworth, Middlesex, the grant being ratified by Henry VI in 1424, (Note: Ibid. 2 Hen. VI, pt. 3, m. 20.) and confirmed by Edward IV in the first year of his reign, (Note: Ibid. 1 Edw. IV, pt. 3, m. 1.) the manor appearing as parcel of the possessions of the abbey of Syon in the Valor of 1535. (Note: Valor Eccl. (Rec. Com.), i, 425.)

=== Priors of Loders ===
- Baldwin, occurs in 1205 (Note: Rot. de Finibus, 1199–1215 (Hardy), 313.)
- R[oger or Robert], occurs in surrender deed of abbot of Montebourg, probably of the year 1213 (Note: Reg. Rubrum, fol. 142.)
- Robert, occurs 1308 (Note: Sarum Epis. Reg. Simon of Ghent, ii, fol. 73.)
- William de Carentonio or le Condu, presented 1313, (Note: Ibid. fol. 126.) withdrawn 1320
- Roger de Hariel, presented 1320 (Note: Ibid. Mortival, i, fol. 87d.)
- Robert Dore, presented 1361, (Note: Ibid. Wyville, ii (Inst.), fol. 285.) resigned 1364
- Sampson Trigal, presented 1364 (Note: Ibid. fol. 305.)
- William Burnell, collated 1401 (Note: Ibid. Mitford.)

== See also ==
- List of monastic houses in Dorset

== Sources ==
- Page, William, ed. (1908). "The Priory of Loders". The Victoria History of the County of Dorset. Vol. 2. London: A. Constable, Ltd. pp. 116–118.
