= Roger de Newburgh =

Anglo-Norman nobleman

Roger de Newburgh (b. 1135-1192) was an Anglo-Norman Aristocrat and son of Robert de Neubourg.

Roger de Newburgh settled in Dorset, England, where he inherited from his father the manor of Winfrith and extensive estates. In 1172, de Newburgh and wife Matilda (whom he married in 1170), founded the Cistercian monastery Bindon Abbey in Dorset which they endowed with lands. The Abbey contains the remains of ten generations of the de Newburgh family.

Roger de Newburgh died about 1192 and was buried in Bindon Abbey. Roger's son and heir was Robert II de Newburgh.
