= Bindon Abbey =

Ruined monastery in Dorset, England

Coordinates: 50.682°N 2.220°W

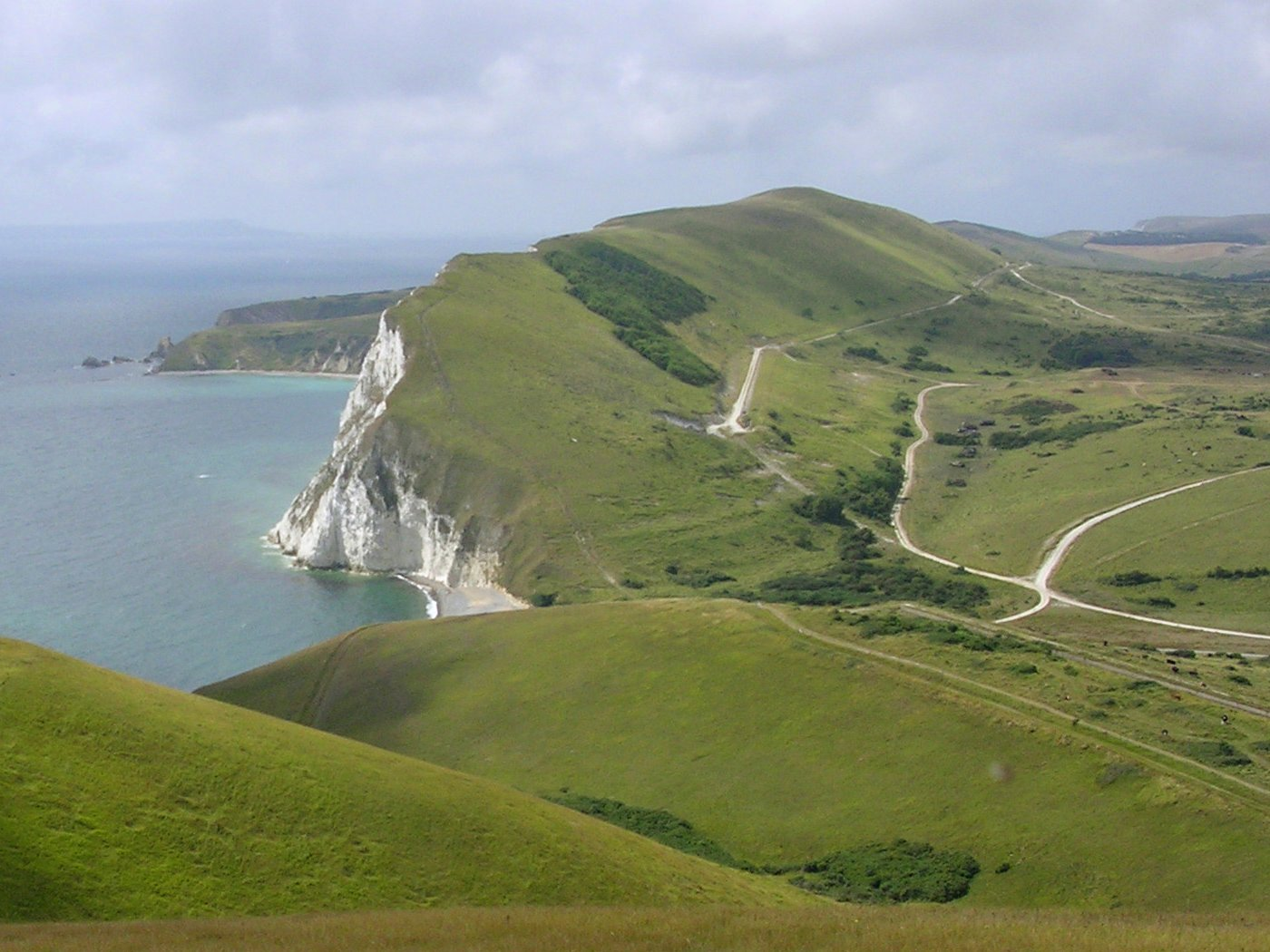
Bindon Hill, original site of the monastery

Bindon Abbey (Bindonium) was a Cistercian monastery, of which only ruins remain, on the River Frome about half a mile east of Wool in Dorset, England.

== History ==
The monastery was founded in 1149 by William de Glastonia on the site since known as Little Bindon near Bindon Hill on the coast near Lulworth Cove as a daughter house of Forde Abbey, but the terrain proved too demanding to sustain the community. In 1172 the monastery moved to a site near Wool, the gift of Roger de Newburgh and his wife, Matilda de Glastonia (the granddaughter of the original founder), who also endowed it with further estates in the county. The monastery retained the name of its original location.

The abbey had the support of the Plantagenet kings, and Henry III granted several letters of protection. In 1280 the abbey was granted the right to a weekly market and annual fair at Wool.

In 1296 the abbot was accused of causing the deaths of two monks. From the 14th century the abbey suffered from a number of internal and economic difficulties which seriously reduced its income and wealth. By 1329 it was said to be 'grievously burdened with debt for want of good rule'. In the Valor Ecclesiasticus of 1535 its annual income was valued at £147, making it one of the smaller monasteries. It was scheduled for Dissolution in 1536, but John Norman, the then abbot, paid the Crown the enormous sum of £300 to save it. The abbey was nevertheless suppressed in 1539.

The site was granted to Thomas Poynings, Baron Poynings, from whom it passed to Thomas Howard, Viscount Howard of Bindon. It was bought in 1641 by the Weld family, later prominent as Roman Catholics, the present landowners.

In 1559 Thomas Howard built a country house on the site of the monastery, but this was burnt down during the English Civil War, although the outline of Howard's gardens, with their moated water features, are visible. The Welds reused the stone for the construction of the nearby Lulworth Castle.

== Buildings and site ==
The foundations of the monastery and the surviving walls show that it followed the standard Cistercian layout of a cruciform church with a nave and two side aisles and a straight east end, with two chapels off each arm of the transept (the so-called 'Bernardine' plan). From an 18th-century engraving, it appears that the elevation of the church featured pointed arches on round piers, like the surviving church at Buildwas Abbey. Most of the construction seems to have taken place around the turn of the 12th and 13th centuries. Later records refer to royal gifts of timber for rebuilding in 1213 and 1235; these works are no longer in evidence, although fragments of the 14th century pulpitum have been excavated. The conventual buildings lay around the cloister to the south of the church. In the chapter-house in the east range the recessed shafts of the columns that supported the ceiling vaulting are still to be seen, a feature derived from the mother house at Forde. Little remains of the south range with the kitchen and refectory.

Access to the ruins is by permission of the current tenants.

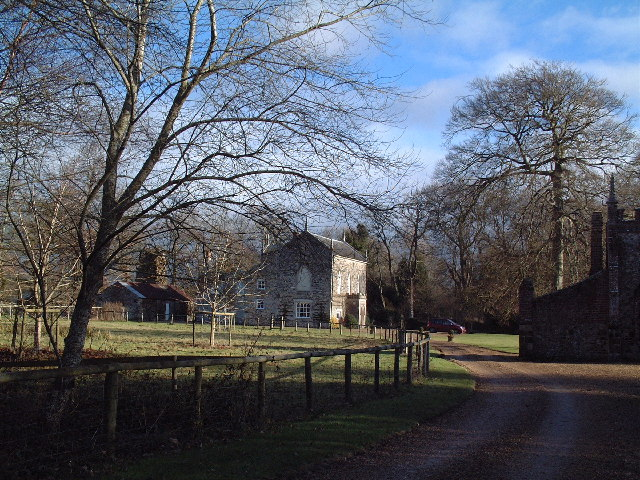
Bindon Abbey House, late 18th century

Between 1794 and 1798 a small "Gothick" house, Bindon Abbey House, was built on part of the former abbey grounds. This and a contemporaneous gatehouse are still in existence. Bindon Abbey House is currently used by Bindon Abbey Wellness Retreat to provide a range of treatments and retreat days.

The mill on the River Frome – Bindon Mill – to the north of the ruins would originally have been part of the monastery. It was converted into a residence between 2006 and 2009.

== Burials ==
- Roger de Newburgh

== Literary references ==
The abbey ruins and the former grave of one of the abbots, which may still be seen, feature in Thomas Hardy's Tess of the d'Urbervilles.

== Sources ==
- Calthrop, M. M. C., 1908: The Abbey of Bindon. In: The Victoria History of the County of Dorset, ed. William Page, Vol. 2, pp. 82 – 90. London: Constable. Text available from: British History Online. ISBN 0-19-722718-X
- Dru Drury, G., 1932–33: The Bindon Abbey Charter of A.D. 1313. Proceedings of the Dorset Natural History and Archaeological Society, Vol. LIV, pp. 35 – 73; Vol. LV, pp. 20 – 25
- Dru Drury, G., 1933: The Abbots of Bindon. Proceedings of the Dorset Natural History and Archaeological Society, Vol. LV, pp. 1 – 19.
- Fergusson, Peter, 1984: Architecture of Solitude: Cistercian Abbeys in Twelfth-Century England, pp. 112 – 113. Princeton, N.J.: Princeton University Press. ISBN 0-691-04024-9
- Hutchins, John, 1861: The History and Antiquities of the County of Dorset, 3rd ed., ed. W. Shipp and J. W. Hodson, Vol. 1, pp. 349 – 360. Westminster: J. B. Nichols
- Moule, H. J., 1885: Bindon Abbey and Woolbridge. Proceedings of the Dorset Natural History and Antiquarian Field Club, Vol. VII, pp. 54 – 65
- Mowl, Timothy, 2003: Historic Gardens of Dorset. Tempus Publishing. ISBN 0-7524-2535-8
- New, Anthony, 1985: A Guide to the Abbeys of England and Wales, pp. 67 – 69. Constable & Company. ISBN 0-09-463520-X
- Newman, John and Nikolaus Pevsner, 1972: The Buildings of England: Dorset, pp. 93 – 94. Harmondsworth: Penguin. ISBN 0-14-071044-2
- Royal Commission on Historical Monuments England, 1970: An Inventory of Historical Monuments in the County of Dorset, Vol. 2, South-East, pp. 404 – 408, plates 201 – 204. London: HMSO. ISBN 0-11-700457-X
