= Gillingham Friary =

Dominican friary in Gillingham, England

Coordinates: 51.033005°N 2.286583°W

Gillingham Friary was possibly a Dominican friary in the town of Gillingham, Dorset, England.
