= Bodmiscombe Preceptory =

Former priory in Devon, England

Coordinates: 50.88048°N 3.268368°W

Bodmiscombe Preceptory was a priory in Devon, England. It was run by the Knights Hospitaller and was possibly founded during the reign on Henry III and dissolved into Buckland Abbey in the 15th century.
