= Axminster Monastery =

Former monastery in Devon, England

Coordinates: 50.7817388°N 2.9993668°W

Axminster Monastery was a monastery in Devon, England. Cyneheard the Ætheling was buried in the minster.
