= John Walker (biographer) =

English clergyman and ecclesiastical historian

John Walker (1674–1747) was an English clergyman and ecclesiastical historian, known for his biographical work on the Church of England priests during the English Civil War and Interregnum.

== Life ==
The son of Endymion Walker, he was baptised at St Kerrian's, Exeter, 21 January 1674. His father was mayor of Exeter in 1682. On 19 November 1691 he matriculated at Exeter College, Oxford, he was admitted Fellow on 3 July 1695, and became full Fellow on 4 July 1696 (vacated 1700).

On 16 January 1698 he was ordained deacon by Sir Jonathan Trelawny, the bishop of Exeter; he graduated B.A. on 4 July, and was instituted to the rectory of St Mary Major, Exeter, on 22 August 1698. On 13 October 1699 he graduated M.A. (incorporated at Cambridge, 1702).

By diploma of 7 December 1714 Walker was made D.D. at Oxford, and on 20 December he was appointed to a prebend at Exeter. On 17 October 1720 he was instituted to the rectory of Upton Pyne, Devon, on the presentation of Hugh Stafford. He died in June 1747 and was buried on 20 June in his churchyard, near the east end of the north aisle of the church. He had married at Exeter Cathedral, on 17 November 1704, Martha Brooking, who died on 12 September 1748, aged 67.

== Sufferings of the Clergy ==
The publication of Edmund Calamy's Account (1702–1713), on the nonconformist ministers silenced and ejected after the 1660 English Restoration, suggested to Charles Goodall and to Walker a similar work on the deprived and sequestered clergy. Goodall advertised for information in the London Gazette; finding that Walker was engaged on a similar task, he passed on the materials he had collected.

Walker gathered particulars by help of query sheets, circulated in various dioceses; those for Exeter and Canterbury were printed by Calamy. Among his helpers was Mary Astell. His manuscript collections were presented to the Bodleian Library in 1754 by Walker's son William, a druggist in Exeter; the lost ‘Minutes of the Bury Presbyterian Classis’ (Chetham Society, 1896) were edited from the transcript in the Walker manuscripts.

Walker's book Sufferings of the Clergy appeared in 1714, The subscription list contained over thirteen hundred names. The work consists of two parts:

- a history of ecclesiastical affairs from 1640 to 1660, the object being to show that the ejection of the Puritans at the Restoration was a just reprisal for their actions when in power;
- a catalogue of the deprived clergy with particulars of their sufferings.

It does not profess to give biographies; the list of names adds up to 3,334 (Calamy's ejected add up to 2,465), but if all the names of the suffering clergy could be recovered, Walker thinks they might reach ten thousand (i. 200). A third part, announced in the title-page as an examination of Calamy's work, was deferred (pref. p. li), and never appeared; Calamy is plentifully attacked in the preface. Walker tried to distinguish doubtful from authenticated matter, and mentions the charges brought against some of his sufferers; but his tone was counter-productive to his argument.

The work was hailed by Thomas Bisse in a sermon before the Corporation of the Sons of the Clergy (6 December 1716) as a "book of martyrology" and "a record which ought to be kept in every sanctuary". John Lewis disparaged it as "a farrago of false and senseless legends". It was criticised, from the nonconformist side, by John Withers (died 1729) of Exeter, in an appendix to his ‘Reply’ (1714), to two pamphlets by John Agate, an Exeter clergyman; and by Calamy in The Church and the Dissenters Compar'd as to Persecution (1719).

An ‘Epitome’ of the Attempt was published at Oxford, 1862. A small abridgment of the Attempt, with biographical additions and an introduction by Robert Whittaker, was published in 1863 under the title The Sufferings of the Clergy.

== List of publications ==
- Sufferings of the Clergy, archive.org text

== Notes ==
Attribution

This article incorporates text from a publication now in the public domain: "Walker, John (1674-1747)". Dictionary of National Biography. London: Smith, Elder & Co. 1885–1900.
