= Bridport Priory =

Priory in Dorset, England

Coordinates: 50.725192°N 2.76657°W

The Priory of St John the Baptist, otherwise Bridport Priory, also known as the Hospital of St John the Baptist, was a mediaeval hospital and priory in Bridport, Dorset, England. It was formerly asserted mistakenly that the priory and the hospital were separate establishments but it is now accepted that both names refer to a single foundation.

The hospital, run by an Augustinian community under the direction of a prior or warden, was established in the early 13th century, some time before 1240, when its existence is attested by a charter. It included a chapel. An inventory of goods belonging to the priory was made on 9 October 1452, including the mass books, vestments and altar goods, the furniture of the hall and pantry, and the kitchen equipment. In the Valor Ecclesiasticus of 1535 its income was assessed at £8/16/1d. It was dissolved in 1547. (Note: cf Chantry#Abolition of Chantries Acts, 1545 and 1547)

The hospital was located next to the east bridge. The site is now occupied by Granby House, 124–128 East Street. Nothing survives of the hospital buildings except for a few remnants at the rear of the current premises, including an oriel window, apparently dating from around 1500 and possibly from the prior's lodging, and an original beam inside.
