= Préaux =

Préaux may refer to the following places in France:

- Préaux, Ardèche, a commune in the department of Ardèche
- Préaux, Indre, a commune in the department of Indre
- Préaux, Mayenne, a commune in the department of Mayenne
- Préaux, Seine-Maritime, a commune in the department of Seine-Maritime
- Préaux-Bocage, a commune in the department of Calvados
- Préaux-du-Perche, a commune in the department of Orne
- Préaux-Saint-Sébastien, a commune in the department of Calvados
- Les Préaux, a commune in the department of Eure

== Other ==
- Préaux Abbey, formerly at Les Préaux, Normandy
