= Dartmouth Friary =

Former friary in Devon, England

Coordinates: 50.342263°N 3.566088°W

Dartmouth Friary was an Augustinian friary in Dartmouth, Devon, England. It was founded in 1331 and ceased to function as a friary in 1347.

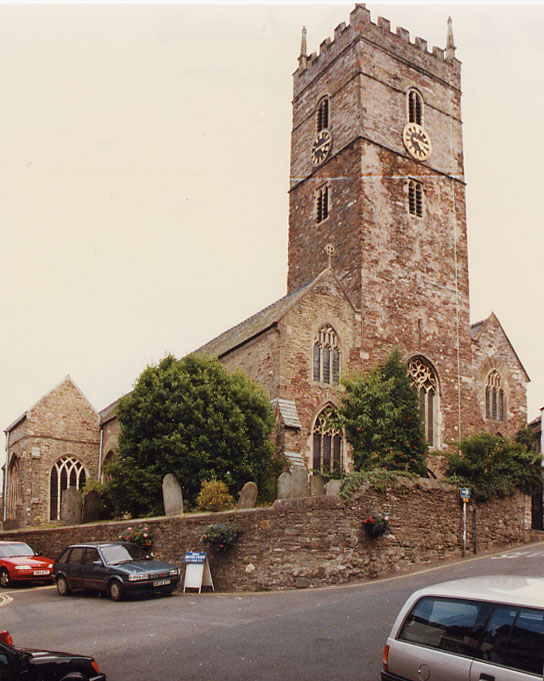
St Saviour, Dartmouth, Devon

== Background ==
Dartmouth is a town near the mouth of the River Dart, on its steep western bank. Its church at Townstal, an historic parish in the higher part of the settlement, was granted to Torre Abbey in about 1198, shortly after the founding of that Abbey by the Premonstratensian order. In 1329 the vicar of Townstal allegedly drowned himself and the Bishop of Exeter punished this crime by issuing an interdict that forbade any religious services from taking place at the church for two years. The Bishop gave permission to William Bacon, one of the wealthiest burgesses of the town, to hold private services at his house, but nothing was done for the general public of the town. In 1330 King Edward III visited Dartmouth and was petitioned by the town's burgesses to allow them to build a church down by the waterside because of what they said was the "very great fatigue of their bodies" in climbing the hill to Townstal. Their petition was granted by a charter dated 16 February 1330 which allowed William Bacon to assign to Torre Abbey an acre of land in Clifton, near the river, to "build anew the parish church". However both the canons of Torre Abbey and the Bishop of Exeter opposed the building of a new church so nothing was done. In 1331, permission was granted "for aged and infirm parishioners" to celebrate mass at the chapel of St. Clare in a lower part of the town, but everyone else was clearly still expected to climb the hill to Townstal.

== Augustinian friary ==
Dissatisfied with the situation, early in 1331 William Bacon negotiated to give the acre of land in Clifton to two Augustinian Hermits on which they should build an "oratory and dwelling houses". They apparently started building promptly because later in 1331 Bishop Grandisson ordered action to be taken against two men "posing as priests" at Dartmouth, and he also excommunicated Bacon. In 1334, the bishop lifted Bacon's excommunication and the following year he allowed the friars to use their newly built chapel, but only for preaching, not for the celebration of mass or to hear confessions.

In 1340, a widow named Elena Cove won a case at the Exeter assizes in which she accused the friars, William Bacon, and several other Dartmouth burgesses of depriving her of a house and half an acre of land at Clifton. As a result of this case, the land was restored to her, reducing the chapel's landholding by half. By 1344 Bishop Grandisson and the Arches court of Canterbury had ordered the friars to demolish their chapel on the grounds that it had been built on a site "belonging to the Abbot and Convent of Torre". The friars appealed to the Pope in Avignon against this decision, but the pope's court eventually decided against them too, holding that papal privilege meant that "no new churches or oratories could be built in territory held in advowson by the [Torre] Abbey".

== Bishop of Damascus ==
According to entries in Bishop Grandisson's registers, in March 1344, before the decision made in Avignon reached Dartmouth, Bishop Hugo of Damascus OSA, a suffragan bishop in partibus arrived in the town. He consecrated the friary church and grounds, apparently claiming to act with the authority of the pope, then heard confessions, granted indulgences to several parishioners, absolved several who were excommunicate, and confirmed and anointed some children. He was then said to have gone into several taverns where he drank, showing people the ring which he wore, saying it had been given to him by the Pope himself. This attempt to save the friary was ultimately unsuccessful, and shortly after the result of the appeal reached Devon the Augustinian Friars were forced to leave.

== Later history ==
The issues relating to the chapel were not resolved until 1372, when a charter dated 4 and 5 October stating that the Abbot and the vicar of Townstal assented to its consecration at the expense of the parishioners who were also to bear the cost of services, with the proviso that if it was neglected in favour of the mother church at Townstal, then it would be closed. At first dedicated to the Holy Trinity, by Bishop Brantingham on 13 October 1372, a chantry chapel of St. Saviour is mentioned by 1496; this latter dedication eventually took over, and the church now standing on the site is known as St Saviour's, which is a Grade I listed building. Two pairs of columns with pointed arches at the west end of the nave may be survivals from the 14th-century building.

== Sources ==
- Freeman, Ray (1990). Dartmouth and its Neighbours. Phillimore. ISBN 0-85033-697-X.
- Jenkins, John Christopher (2010). Torre Abbey: Locality, Community, and Society in Medieval Devon (Thesis submitted for the Degree of Doctor of Philosophy). University of Oxford. pp. 162–167. (This is a pdf file but the downloaded file omits the file suffix)
