= Sidmouth Priory =

Former priory in Devon, England

Coordinates: 50.678409°N 3.238081°W

Sidmouth Priory was a priory in Devon, England.

An Alien priory of Benedictine monks, a monastic cell or monastic grange dependent on Mont St Michel founded in the 11th Century through their ownership of Otterton Priory. The manor was granted by William the Conqueror and dissolved in 1414; occupied by Bridgettine monks as a grange of Syon Abbey in circa 1431. Currently dissolved and the remains of the chapel of St Peter are incorporated in the Marlborough Hotel in Sidmouth which now known as Dukes Seaside Inn.

The earliest record of the chapel is 1322, when due to the movement of the River Sid, when the parish boundaries between Sidmouth and Salcombe Regis had to be redrawn with a line drawn eastwards from the chapel towards what is now Port Royal.
