= Leigh Cell =

Former monastery in Devon, England

Coordinates: 50.309351°N 3.810883°W

Leigh Cell was a monastery near Churchstow in Devon, England.
