= Mayne Preceptory =

Monastery in Dorset, England, UK

Coordinates: 50°40′41″N 2°22′23″W

Mayne Preceptory was a medieval house of Knights Hospitaller in Dorset, England, which caused the name of the settlement to change from Maine in Domesday (one of two manors named Maine in Cullifordtree Hundred) to Friar Mayne by the mid-14th century. It was formerly located in West Knighton parish, now in modern Broadmayne parish.

The preceptory was established between 1290 and 1338. It declined in activity until 1533, where it began leasing its bailiwick to provide stipends for rectories, vicarages and the larger preceptories in other locations. Its lands were forfeited to the crown at the Dissolution of the Monasteries in the early 16th century and were eventually sold.

The preceptory also owned a property at Kingston in Stinsford, given to the Hospitallers by Thomas del Boys, sometimes described as the 'camera' of Kingston (camera meaning in this context an estate with no community and farmed out to a tenant). In 1338 it comprised a house (messuagium) and garden, 68 acres of arable land, an acre and a half of meadow, pasture for 6 oxen, 8 cows and 100 sheep, and the church of Stinsford. The preceptory also owned further property at Waye(i.e., Westbrook in Upwey).
