= Church of St Mary Major, Exeter =

Historic former church in Exeter, England

Coordinates: 50.7224°N 3.5313°W

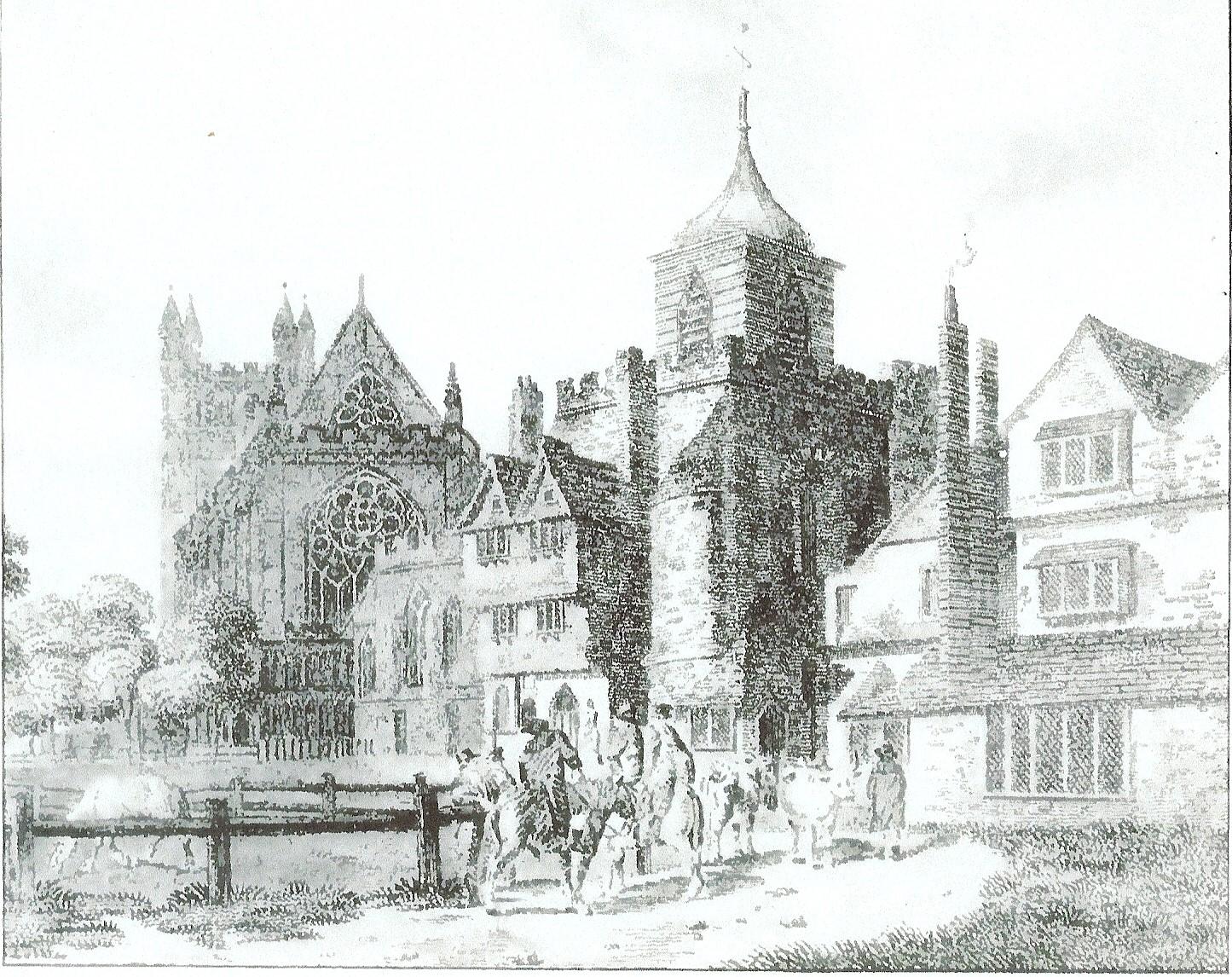
View from north-west: Centre with square tower, the Church of St Mary Major, Exeter, the Norman building demolished in 1865. At left is the west front of Exeter Cathedral. The axis of St Mary Major is towards the north-east, whilst the cathedral is more to due east, as is apparent from the depiction.

The Church of St Mary Major, formerly Exeter Minster, was a historic church and parish in the City of Exeter, Devon, dating from the 7th century. It pre-dated the first Exeter Cathedral by some five centuries, was rebuilt several times, but was finally demolished in 1971. It was situated to the immediate south-west of Exeter Cathedral, the site today being a grass lawn.

== History ==
The earliest known form of a building on the site was a Roman bath-house, built 60–65 AD. In the 7th century the Saxons built on the site of the bath-house a monastery or minster. Saint Boniface (c. 675–754), supposed to have been born in Crediton, Devon, was educated at Exeter Minster in 680, when the monastery of Escancastre, or Examchester was under the rule of Abbot Wulfhard. It was refounded circa 930 by the Anglo-Saxon King Æthelstan but was burnt down by Viking raiders in 1003. It was rebuilt by King Canute in 1018. In 1050 the See of Crediton moved its seat to Exeter Minster, by licence of King Edward the Confessor, which was the founding of the See of Exeter. After the Norman Conquest of 1066, in 1114 Bishop William Warelwast commenced the building of a new cathedral to house the See of Exeter, on the site of the present Exeter Cathedral, to the immediate north-east of Exeter Minster. The new cathedral was completed circa 1220, whereupon the minster was vacated by the bishop, and was converted to a parish church dedicated to Saint Mary. The "Major" suffix appears to indicate a church of special status, as in the Basilica di Santa Maria Maggiore in Rome. It was demolished in 1865 in order to build a larger church to house the expanded population of the city, which new building was consecrated in 1867. It escaped the bombing in World War II which so much of the city suffered, but was finally demolished in 1971, being by then little attended by parishioners. Following the demolition several Saxon graves were discovered on the site, together with the foundations of the Roman bath-house and Saxon Minster. The site is now a level grass lawn.

== See also ==
- Exeter monastery
- Church of St Mary Steps, Exeter
