= Melcombe Priory =

Priory in Melcombe Regis, Dorset, England

Coordinates: 50.615142°N 2.45847°W

Melcombe Priory was a Dominican priory in Melcombe Regis, Dorset, England.

== History ==
This, the last Dominican foundation in England, was founded in 1418 by Sir Hugh Deverell and John Rogers of Bryanston, with the licence of Pope Martin V, on the basis that the town of Melcombe Regis was at that time without any church or other religious foundation.

The friars also built part of the defences of the town, in the form of a jetty and a tower, for which they received concessions from the Crown.

The priory was taken into the King's hand in 1538 at the Dissolution of the Monasteries. In 1541 the site and buildings were leased to Sir John Rogers, grandson of the founder, for 21 years, and bought outright by him in 1543.

The dedication of the priory church was either to Saint Dominic or to Saint Winifred. The buildings were mostly ruinous by 1650, but some still remained in 1803. The site, in Governor's Lane and Maiden Street, with the burial ground apparently to the north, was cleared for building development in 1861.

== Sources ==
- British History Online: Victoria County History of Dorset vol 2 - The Dominican Friars of Melcombe Regis
