= St Monica's Priory, Spetisbury =

Religious house in England

St Monica's Priory, Spetisbury was a religious house in Spetisbury, Dorset, England. Between 1800 and 1926 it passed through the hands of several different orders and was demolished in 1927.

== History ==
Spetisbury House was an 18th-century country house. In 1800 it was acquired by an exiled community of Augustinian nuns from Louvain, canonesses regular of the Windesheim Congregation. They ran a school here until 1861, when they established St. Augustine's Priory at Abbotsley House in Abbotskerswell, Devon, and sold the premises to a community of Bridgettines of Syon Abbey from Lisbon. They moved on in 1887 (to Chudleigh Abbey, Chudleigh), and the buildings were taken over by the Canons Regular of the Lateran based at Bodmin, who sold it in 1907 to a refugee community of Ursulines from Mortain in Normandy exiled by the French anti-religious laws.

The Ursulines moved away in 1926, selling the house to a contractor who demolished it for the materials in the following year.

The burial ground however was excluded from the sale and still survives as a garden.

== See also ==
- Spetisbury Priory
