= Totnes Trinitarian Priory =

Medieval monastic house in Devon, England

Coordinates: 50.42920°N 3.68427°W

Totnes Trinitarian Priory, also known as the Trinitarian hospital of Warland was a medieval monastic house in the town of Totnes in Devon, England. It was founded in 1271, and dissolved in 1509.

Parts of the priory's chapel still remain as ruins.
