= Exeter Blackfriars =

Former priory in England

Coordinates: 50.723763°N 3.528231°W

Exeter Blackfriars was a Dominican priory in the centre of Exeter, the county town of Devon in England. It was dissolved in 1538.

== Burials ==
- John Dinham (1406–1458) and wife Joan Arches (daughter of Richard Arches)
- Lady Isabel de Vere Courtenay, Daughter of Hugh de Vere, 4th Earl of Oxford and Hawise de Quincy

== See also ==
- Exeter monastery
