= Spetisbury Priory =

Monastery in Dorset, England

Coordinates: 50.821750°N 2.125303°W

Spetisbury Priory, also Spettisbury Priory, was a medieval priory in Spetisbury or Spettisbury, Dorset, England.

== History ==
The alien house of Benedictine monks at Spettisbury was a cell of the Abbey of St. Peter of Préaux in Normandy, under the priory of Toft in Norfolk. Lands and rights in both these places, and in Charlton Marshall in Dorset, were given to the abbey in the reign of William Rufus by Robert, Earl of Leicester and Count of Meulan, who in 1118 retired to the abbey to die.

After the suppression of alien houses in 1414 the priory at Spettisbury was eventually given to the charterhouse at Witham in Somerset.

After its dissolution it was granted in 1543/44 to Charles Blount, Lord Mountjoy.

== See also ==
- St Monica's Priory, Spetisbury
