= Exeter Greyfriars =

Friary in Devon, England

Coordinates: 50.721295°N 3.537093°W

Exeter Greyfriars was a Franciscan friary in Exeter, Devon, England. It was founded in the earlier part of the 13th century, before 1240, and was dissolved in 1538.

Excavations have revealed burials and some remains of the structures.

== See also ==
- Exeter monastery
