= St James Priory, Exeter =

Former priory in Devon, England

Coordinates: 50.708658°N 3.515571°W

St James Priory, Exeter was a priory in Devon, England.

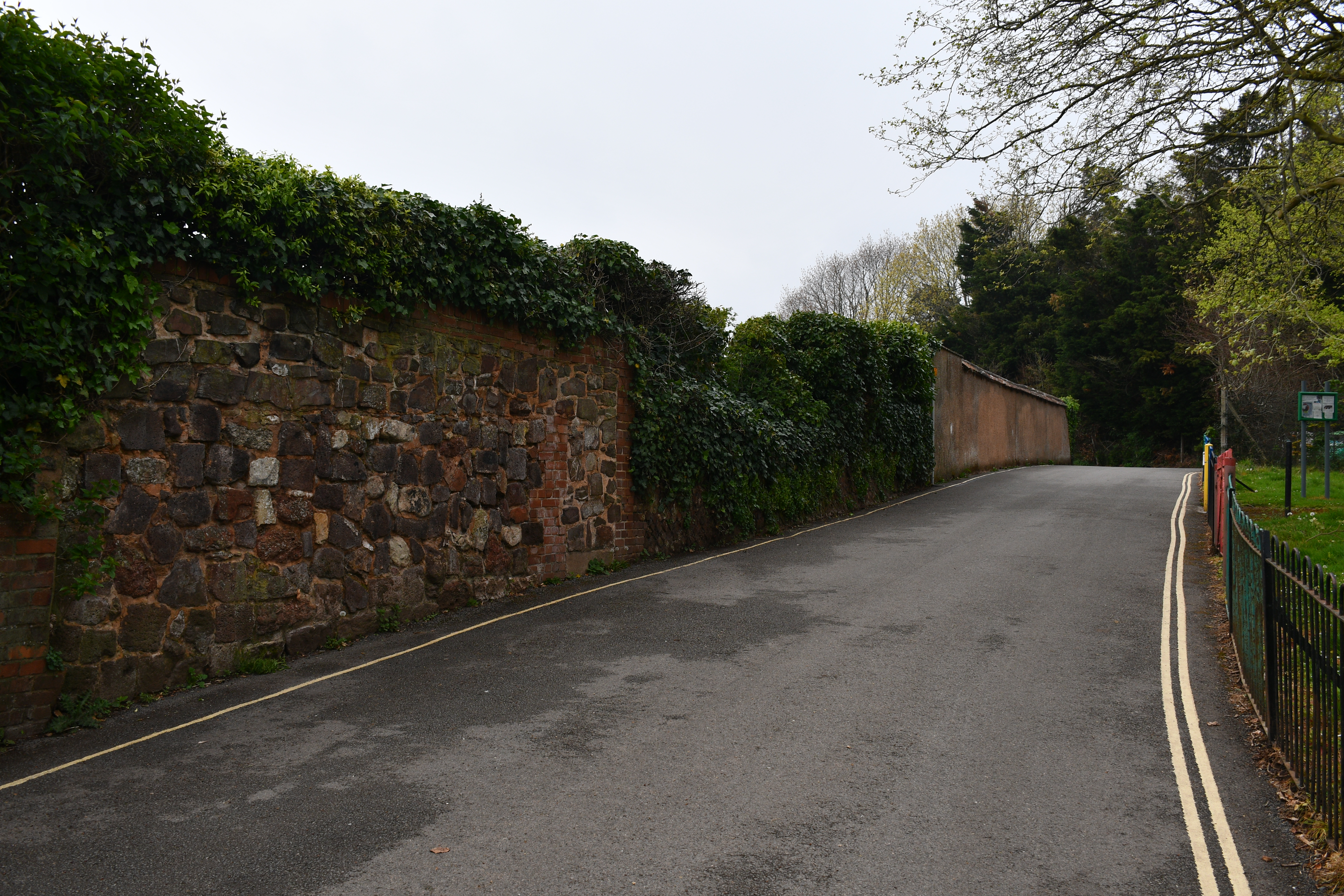
St James Priory, Exeter

The Feudal Manor of St James Priory was located in the current district of Heavitree, a suburb of the city of Exeter, Devon. The parcel had a value of 20 shillings (£1) and consisted of one villager, 2 slaves, and 2 carucates of land. Carucate was a unit of assessment for tax. A carucate was the amount of land cultivated by a team of eight oxen in one farming season, which was a nominal 120 acres. In many instances, there was not a direct relationship between a carucate and the actual size of the land taxed. Therefore, the land extension of the Manor was likely much smaller than 240 acres.

The name appears in Domesday Book of 1086, where it is recorded that the Viking of Whipton and the nobleman Roger Blunt were Lords of Heavitree in 1066 and 1086 respectively. In addition, it also stated that Ralph of Pomeroy was the Tenant-in-chief of the Lordship at the time of Roger Blunt.

== History ==
The priory was founded in 1146 by Baldwin de Redvers, the 1st Earl of Devon, a kinsman of the Dukes of Normandy. It was a cell to the Cluniac monastery of St Martin-des-Champs near Paris. The title was inherited by Baldwin's son and heir, Richard, who married Dionysia, daughter of Reginald de Dunstanville (illegitimate son of Henry I). They left two sons who later inherited the title of Earl.

Between 1284 and 1431, the Prior of St James held the Lordship in alms from the Barony of Plympton, which Barony was held by the Earls of Devon (the sons of Richard I, King of England and Duke of Normandy). Afterwards, the Lordship passed with the Earldom until the reign of Henry VI.

In 1444, Henry VI granted the Lordship to King's College, Cambridge, which he had founded in 1441. The Lordship of St James Priory was in King's College possession until 1992.

== See also ==
- Exeter monastery
