= Polsloe Priory =

Building in Exeter, Devon, England

Coordinates: 50°44′3″N 3°30′7″W

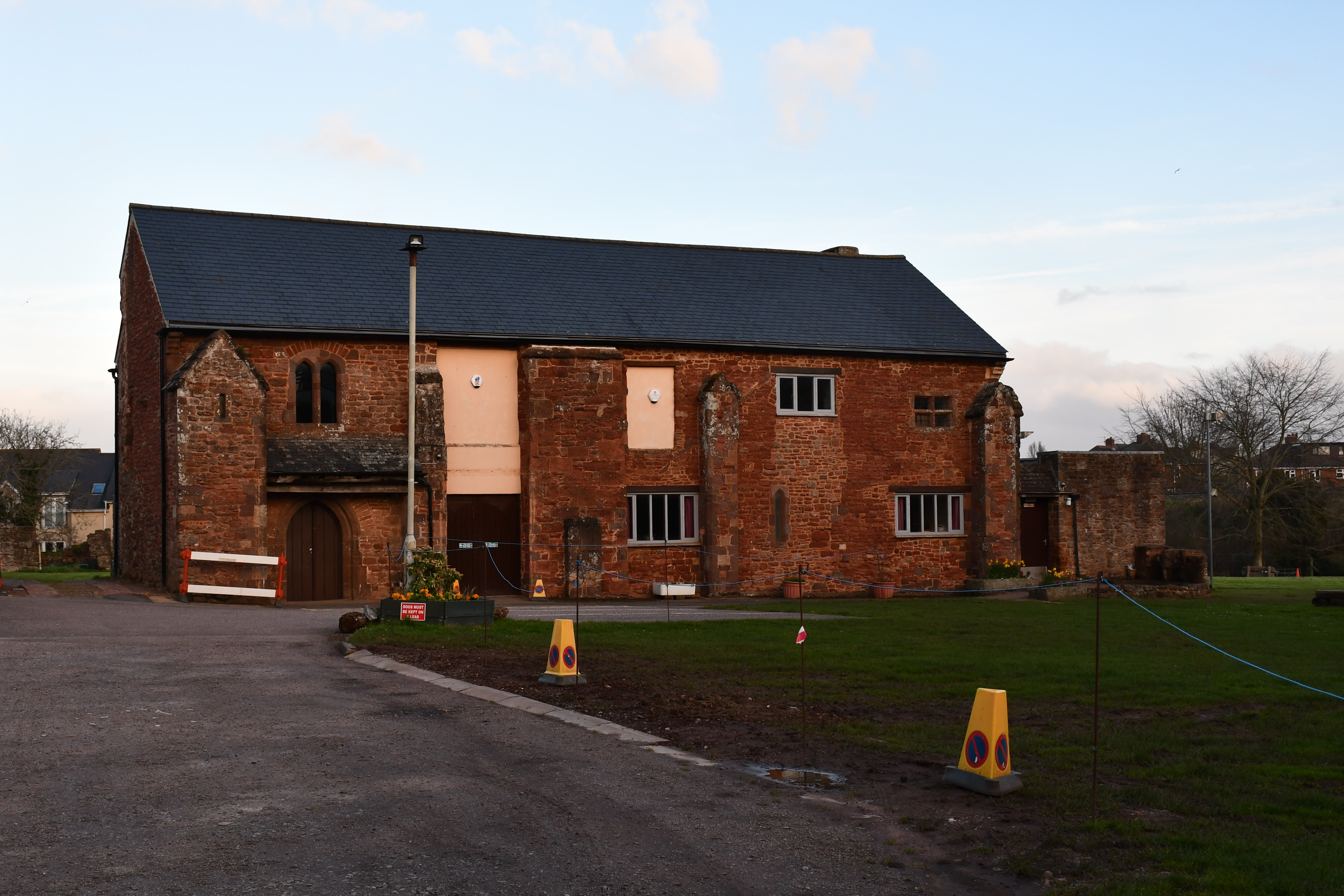
Remnants of Polsloe Priory in 2020, with a new roof

Polsloe Priory, also known as St Katherine's Priory, was a Benedictine priory for women (a nunnery) in Devon, England. It was founded in around 1159 on land to the east of Exeter, on a site that is now part of the city's suburb of Polsloe. At the time it was the only religious house for women in Devon, but two others were founded later: at Cornworthy and Canonsleigh Abbey. The first prioress of whom any record survives was Avelina in 1218. Amongst the holdings of the priory was the Church of St Mary, Marston Magna in Somerset.

In common with most other Catholic institutions, it was dissolved by Henry VIII, in 1539, even though it had paid a fine of £400 for exemption from the Suppression of Religious Houses Act 1535. At dissolution it had 14 nuns, including the prioress and subprioress.

Most of the buildings have been demolished, but one remains, built of the local red sandstone and believed to date from around 1320. English Heritage have designated it a Grade II* listed building. As of 2016 it is used by the local community association for occasional events, having passed from private to City Council hands in 1934.

== See also ==
- Exeter Cathedral
- Exeter monastery

== Sources ==
- Lega-Weeks, Ethel (1934), "The Pre-Reformation History of St. Katherine's Priory, Polsloe", Report and Transactions of the Devonshire Association, 66: 181–199
