= List of monastic houses in Hampshire =

The following is a list of the monastic houses in Hampshire, England.

Locations of monastic houses in Hampshire
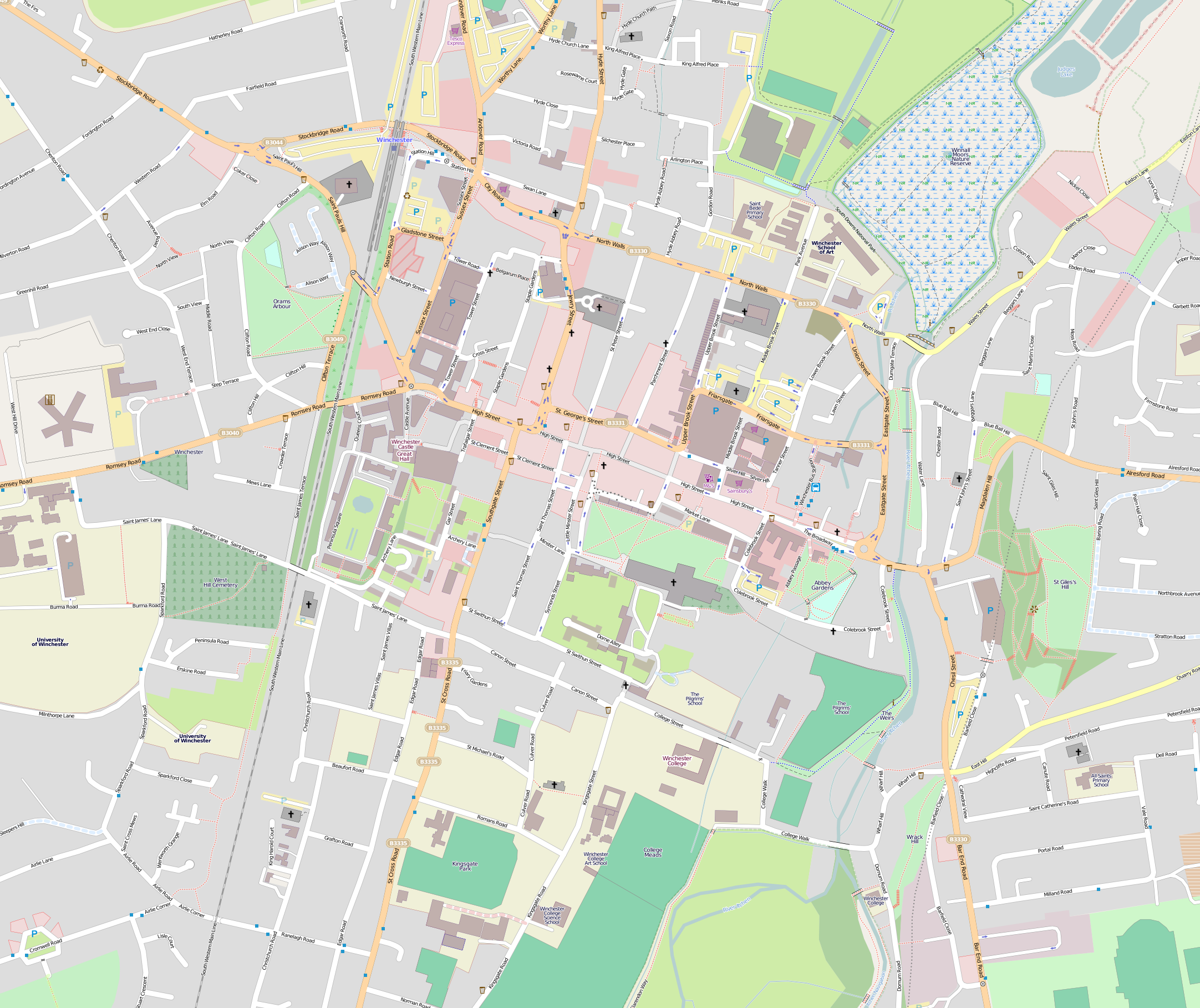
Locations of monastic houses in Winchester
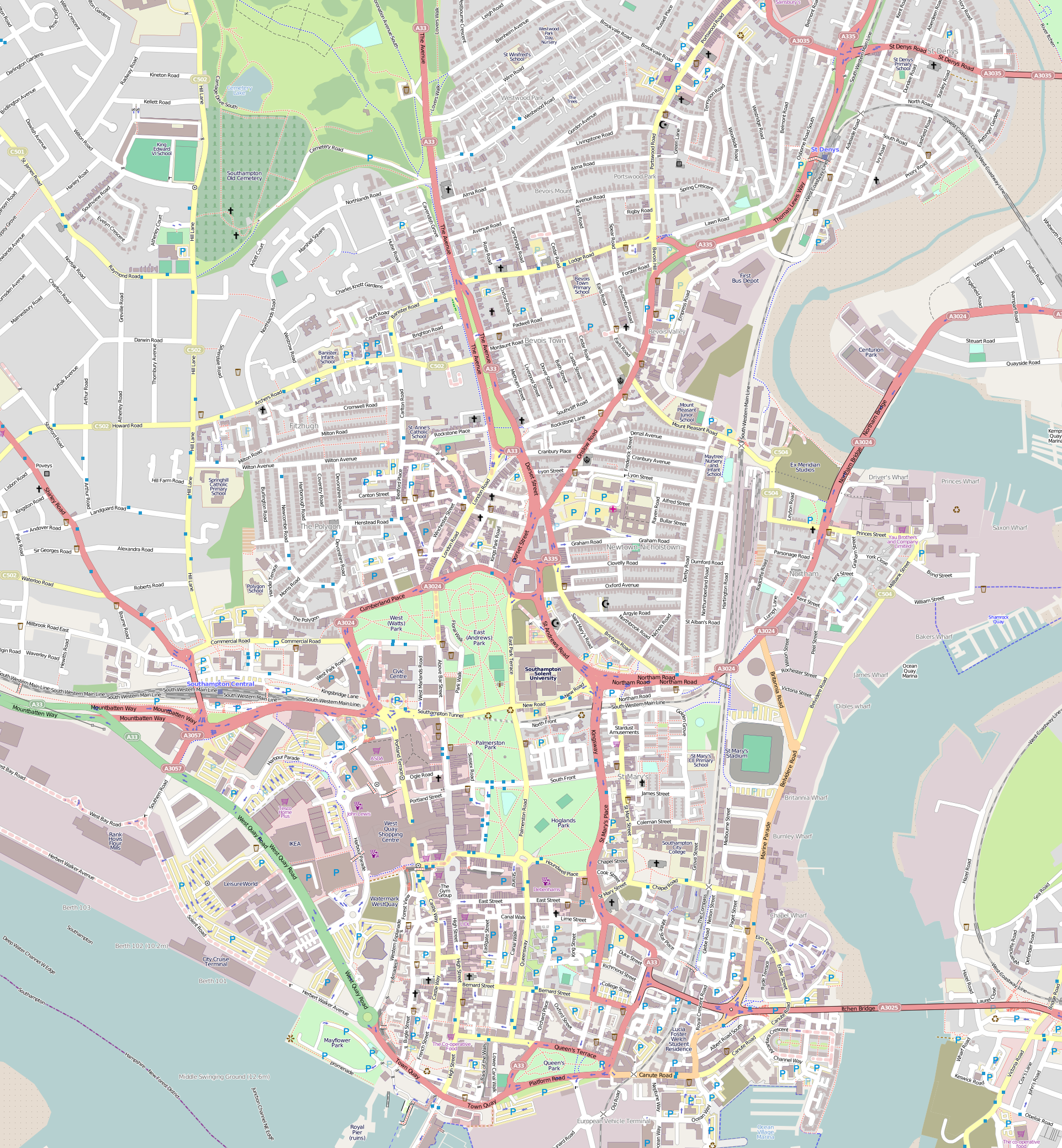
Locations of monastic houses in Southampton

Alien houses are included, as are smaller establishments such as cells and notable monastic granges (particularly those with resident monks), and also camerae of the military orders of monks (Knights Templar and Knights Hospitaller). Monastic hospitals are included where they had the status or function of an abbey, priory, or preceptor/commandery.

Abbreviations and key

Status of remains
Symbol	Status
None	Ruins
*	Current monastic function
^{+}	Current non-monastic ecclesiastic function (including remains incorporated into later structure)
^	Current non-ecclesiastic function (including remains incorporated into later structure) or redundant intact structure
^{$}	Remains limited to earthworks etc.
^{#}	No identifiable trace of the monastic foundation remains
^{~}	Exact site of monastic foundation unknown
^{≈}	Identification ambiguous or confused

Locations with names in italics indicate possible duplication (misidentification with another location) or non-existent foundations (either erroneous reference or proposed foundation never implemented) or ecclesiastical establishments with a monastic name but lacking actual monastic connection.

Trusteeship
EH	English Heritage
LT	Landmark Trust
NT	National Trust

Foundation	Image	Communities and provenance	Formal name or dedication and alternative names	References & location
Alton Abbey *		Anglican Benedictine monks founded 1895; extant	The Abbey of Our Lady and Saint John	51°07′59″N 1°01′41″W
Andover Priory		Benedictine monks alien house: dependent on St-Florent-de-Saumur; founded before 1087, church of St Mary granted to St-Florent by William the Conqueror, confirmed by the Pope 1146; dissolved c.1414; alienated to Winchester College	St Peter Blessed Virgin Mary	51°12′36″N 1°28′42″W
Andwell Priory		Tironensian monks alien house: daughter of Tiron founded between 1100 and 1135 (during the reign of Henry I) by Adam de Port of Maplederwell; dedicated 1215/38 by John, Bishop of Ardfert (officiating for Peter des Roches, Bishop of Winchester); dissolved 1391; granted to Winchester College	The Blessed Virgin Mary (or St John the Baptist?)	51°16′06″N 1°00′51″W
Baddesley Preceptory ^{#}		Knights Hospitaller transferred from Godsfield Preceptory; Hospitallers manor and estate of Godsfield here before 1167; transferred here before/c.1355; dissolved 1540; granted to Sir Nicolas Trockmorton 1539/40; house named 'Baddesley Manor' built on site	North Baddesley Preceptory; South Badeisley Preceptory	50°59′06″N 1°25′43″W; North Baddesley, Southampton
Beaulieu Abbey ^		Cistercian monks transferred from Faringdon Abbey, Berkshire daughter of Citeaux; founded 2 November 1203 (1204) by John; dissolved 1538; granted to Thomas Wriothesley Esq. 1538/9; now part of Beaulieu Palace House, in private ownership with public access	The Abbey Church of Saint Mary, Beaulieu ____________________; Bellus Locus Regis; De Bello Loco Regis; (Royal Beaulieu); abbatia quae vocitatur Bellus Locus	50°49′19″N 1°27′00″W
Breamore Priory		Augustinian Canons Regular founded 1128-33 by Baldwin de Reveriis and his uncle Hugh; dissolved 1536; granted to Henry, Marquis of Exeter 1536/7; Elizabethan manor house (1536) on site	The Priory Church of the Holy Trinity, Saint Mary and Saint Michael, Breamore ____________________; Bromere Priory	50°58′15″N 1°47′03″W
Breamore Minster ?		large pre-Conquest church suggested to have been a minster 10th century — evidence lacking	St Mary	
Damerham Monastery		Saxon monastery founded before 880–5; community mentioned in Alfred the Great's will; land granted to Glastonbury, Wessex (Somerset) after 944–6		
Eling Monastery ?		possible site of ancient monastery under Abbot Cimberth (Cynebert), (alternatively at Redbridge); founded c.680; strong evidence that the current Parish Church of St Mary, substantially restored 1863, was the pre-conquest minster, possibly Reodford/Redbridge	possibly Reodford Monastery; possibly Nursling Monastery	50°54′38″N 1°28′46″W (possible)
Ellingham Priory		Benedictine monks alien house: cell, dependent on St-Sauveur-le-Vicomte founded 1160, church of St Mary and land granted by William de Solariis to build a cell; dissolved 1414; granted to Eton College 1462	Church of Saint Mary Church of All Saints	50°52′27″N 1°47′46″W
Farnborough Abbey *		Premonstratensian Canons cell founded 1887; French Benedictine 1895; raised to abbey status 1903; English Benedictine cell of Prinknash Abbey, Gloucestershire 1947; priory 1969; independent community 1980; extant	The Abbey Church of Saint Michael the Archangel, Farnborough	51°17′49″N 0°44′58″W
Fordingbridge Preceptory ?		Knights Templar built 12th century on site of Saxon church; church owned by Templars, possible preceptory — lacking positive identification; transferred to Knights Hospitallers 1308–12; intact non-parochial chapel incorporated into present parochial church		50°55′25″N 1°47′42″W
Godsfield Preceptory		Knights Hospitaller founded before/c.1171; transferred to North Baddesley 1355; chapel on site c.1360-70		51°07′46″N 1°08′16″W
Hamble Priory		Tironensian monks alien house: daughter of Tiron founded between 1109 and 1140 by William Giffard, Bishop of Winchester; dissolved 1391; granted to Winchester College	Priory of St Andrew, Hamble ____________________; Hamble-en-le-rys; Hamblerice; Hamble-le-Rice	50°51′32″N 1°19′03″W
Hayling Priory		Benedictine monks alien house: daughter of Jumièges founded after/c.1067 ("by King William, and afterwards by King Henry I"), land granted by William the Conqueror; part of estate (possibly including church and conventual buildings) inundated by the sea 1324-5 and 1340; dissolved 1413; granted to Arundel College 1541/2; granted to the Carthusians at Sheen, Surrey (Greater London); site is now beneath the sea — a number of locations suggested as being the main site	Halling Priory; Hailing Priory	off shore from Hayling Island; 50°48′14″N 0°58′02″W (approx)
Marwell 'Priory'		Augustinian Canons Regular founded 13th century by Henry de Blois, Bishop of Winchester; secular college for four priests, of whom one was titled 'prior'; dissolved after 1540; granted to Sir Henry Seymore 1551	SS Stephen, Laurence, Vincent and Quintin, Martyrs ____________________; Merewell Priory; Merewelle Priory	51°00′16″N 1°17′08″W (approx)
Mottisfont Abbey ^		Augustinian Canons Regular founded 1201 (13th century) by William Brimere dissolved 1536; granted to William, Lord Sandys 1536/7; remains now incorporated into a mansion named 'Mottisfont Abbey' built 1538–40	The Priory Church of the Holy Trinity, Mottisfont ____________________; Mottisfont Priory; Motisfont Priory	51°02′28″N 1°32′06″W
Netley Abbey		Cistercian monks daughter of Beaulieu founded 25 July 1239, projected by Peter des Roches, Bishop of Winchester on land granted by him before 1238; co-founder with Henry III; dissolved 1536; granted to Sir William Paulet 1536/7; (EH)	The Abbey Church of the Blessed Virgin Mary and Saint Edward the Confessor, Netley ____________________; Locus Sancti Edwardi (Lieu-Saint-Edward); Nettely Abbey	50°52′44″N 1°21′27″W
Nursling Monastery ?		Benedictine monks founded 8th century by St Boniface; destroyed in raids by the Danes c.878; 'The Walls' reputedly the site of monastery; although argued that the monastery was at Romsey (Note: Nursling — Hase asserts monastery at Romsey); inconclusive evidence of pre-Conquest foundation from excavations during 1982	possibly Redford Monastery; Reodford Monastery	50°56′48″N 1°28′33″W (possible)
Pamber Priory ^{+}		Benedictine monks alien house: daughter of St Vigor, Cerisy (Cerisy-le-Forêt); founded 1100 (c.1120-30); dissolved 1135; dissolved 1414; granted to St Julian's Hospital, Southampton; granted to Queen's College, Oxford 1446 and continues in that ownership; priory church extant	St Mary and St John the Baptist ____________________; Monk Sherborne Priory; Sherborne Priory	51°19′18″N 1°08′02″W
Portchester Priory ^{+}		Augustinian Canons Regular founded 1128-9 (Note: foundation of Portchester according to research)(1133 (Note: traditional foundation of Portchester)), by William de Pont de l'Arche(d'Arch), chamberlain and sheriff of Hampshire, with the assistance of Henry I within the walls of the castle; site soon proved unsuitable; transferred to Southwick c.1145; dissolved 7 April 1538; granted to John White 1538/9; priory church in parochial use as the Parish Church of St Mary	St Mary ____________________; Porchester Priory	50°50′12″N 1°06′48″W
Portsmouth Blackfriars	projected house for Dominican Friars (1225) establishment never implemented			
Redbridge Monastery		founded c.680; possible site of ancient monastery under Abbot Cimberth (Cynebert), though more likely at Eling	Reodford Monastery (Note: source: Bede)	Redbridge
Romsey Abbey ^{+}		nuns probably founded c.907 by Edward the Elder or by Ethelwold, Saxon nobleman Benedictine nuns refounded 967 by King Edgar; dissolved 1539; granted to John Bellow and R. Pigot 1546/7; church now in parochial use	The Abbey Church of Saint Mary and Saint Elfleda, Romsey ____________________; Rumesey Abbey	50°59′23″N 1°30′05″W
Sapalanda Monastery		possible monastery, possibly from Winchester Cathedral Priory (Note: Sapalanda — communication and references from Christopher N. L. Brooke considers Winton Domesday to refer to land tenure, possibly monks from the Cathedral)		
Selborne Priory		Augustinian Canons Regular founded 1233–34 by Peter des Roches, Bishop of Winchester (charter dated 20 January 1233/4, confirmed by Pope Gregory IX September 1235); dissolved 1484: house financially and physically dilapidated; annexed by Magdalen College, Oxford 11 September 1484 (confirmed 1485)	Priory Church of the Blessed Virgin Mary	51°06′14″N 0°55′21″W
Southampton — Greyfriars		Franciscan Friars founded before 1235; Observant Franciscan Friars refounded 1498; dissolved 1534; Augustinian Friars founded 1534; dissolved 1538; granted to John Pollard 1544/5; granted to Arthur Darcy 1551	Southampton Austin Friars	50°53′51″N 1°24′11″W close to God's House, Southampton
Southampton — St Denys's Priory		Augustinian Canons Regular founded 1127 (1124) by Henry I; dissolved 1536; granted to Francis Dawtrey 1538/9	St Denis Priory; St Denys by Southampton Priory	50°55′26″N 1°22′52″W
St Leonard's Grange		Cistercian monks grange and chapel (Note: St Leonard's Grange — Victoria County History: A History of the County of Hampshire: Volume 4, p.654) dependent on Beaulieu; founded 13th century		
Southwick Priory		Augustinian Canons Regular (community founded at Portchester c.1128-9 (or 1133)); transferred here 1145, built 1145-53 (indulgences granted by the Archbishop of Canterbury to establish the canons at Southwick); dissolved 7 April 1538	Our Lady of Southwick	50°52′26″N 1°06′42″W
Temple Southington Preceptory		Knights Templar founded before 1240 (Note: A. A. Locke, Victoria County History: A History of the County of Hampshire, Volume 3, p.7, citing Calbourne Charter R., 1226–57; no further reference); dissolved before 1308	Temple Preceptory; Sotherington Preceptory	
Titchfield Abbey		Premonstratensian Canons — from Halesowen, Worcestershire (West Midlands) daughter of Halesowen; founded 1232-3 by Peter des Roches (Peter de Rupibis), Bishop of Winchester; dissolved December 1537; granted to Thomas Wriothesley 1537; converted into a mansion named 'Palace House' by 1542, much of which demolished 1781; (EH)	The Abbey Church of the Blessed Virgin Mary and Saint John the Evangelist, Titchfield ____________________; Tychfield Abbey	50°51′25″N 1°13′53″W
Ventnor Priory	Historical county location. See entry under List of monastic houses on the Isle of Wight			
Wherwell Abbey ^{#}		Benedictine nuns founded c.986 by Elfrida, widow of King Edgar, probably on site of Saxon minster; dissolved 21 November 1539; country house named 'The Priory' built on site mid-18th century, immediately to the south-east of the abbey church	The Abbey Church of the Holy Cross and Saint Peter, Wherwell ____________________; Whrewell Abbey	51°09′55″N 1°26′30″W
Winchester — St Augustine's Friary, possible earlier site ^{~}		Augustinian Friars (under the Limit of Oxford) founded before 1300 possibly on a site outside the city wall; in 1342 the Pope instructed the Bishop of Winchester to allow the friars to move from their premises to a site they had procured within the city wall 1341; the Pope sanctioned the move in 1346 (see immediately below)		
Austin Friary, Winchester ^{~}		Augustinian Friars (under the Limit of Oxford) (community founded before 1300 possibly on a site outside the city wall (see immediately above)) transfer sanctioned by the Pope 1346; dissolved 1538; house named 'The Friary' built in the vicinity of the site		51°03′32″N 1°19′06″W
Winchester Blackfriars		Dominican Friars (under the Visitation of London) founded c.1231 (before 1235); dissolved 1538		51°03′41″N 1°18′30″W
Winchester Greyfriars		Franciscan Friars (under the Custody of London) founded 1237; dissolved 1538; granted 1543/4	St Francis	51°03′51″N 1°18′37″W
Carmelite Friary, Winchester		Carmelite Friars founded before 1268 (1278) by Peter, rector of St Helen's, Winchester; dissolved 1538		51°03′25″N 1°18′54″W
Hyde Abbey		Benedictine monks (community founded at New Minster 901); transferred from New Minster, (see immediately below), 1110 (1109); dissolved 30 April 1539; granted to Richard Bethel 1545/6	New Minster	51°04′07″N 1°18′52″W
New Minster, Winchester		secular canons founded 901 by Edward the Elder, site granted by Alfred the Great; Benedictine monks refounded 964; transferred to new site at Hyde (see immediately above) 1110 (1109)	The New Minster	51°03′41″N 1°18′49″W
St. Mary's Abbey, Winchester ^{#}		Benedictine nuns founded c.902 (c.900 / 9th century) by Alfred the Great and his queen Ealhswith; completed before 908 by Edward the Elder refounded and rededicated 963 by Bishop Ethelwold; rededicated 1108; destroyed in the siege of Winchester; rebuilt 1141; dissolved 15 November 1539; granted to John Bello and John Broxholme 1546/7	St Mary ____________________; Nunnaminster Abbey; St Mary's Abbey	51°03′38″N 1°18′38″W
Priory of Saint Swithun		fictitious accounts of very early foundation; Saxon monastery built before 642-3 by King Cenwealh; Benedictine monks founded 648; episcopal diocesan cathedral founded c.662/3: see split from Dorchester; damaged in raids by the Danes 860 and 879; repaired; demolished 1093-4 when the East end of the new cathedral church was completed (see immediately below)	The Cathedral Church of the Holy Trinity, Saint Peter and Saint Paul in Winchester The Cathedral Church of the Holy Trinity, Saint Peter, Saint Paul and Saint Swithun in Winchester ____________________; Old Minster	51°03′40″N 1°18′50″W
Winchester Cathedral Priory ^{+}		secular canons founded c.942–1064: built 1079-1094 by Wakelin, Bishop of Winchester; Benedictine monks founded 964; dissolved 1539; episcopal diocesan cathedral founded 8 April 1093; extant	The Cathedral Church of the Holy Trinity, Saint Peter, Saint Paul and Saint Swithun in Winchester	51°03′39″N 1°18′47″W
Wintney Priory		Cistercian nuns founded before 1200 (during the reign of William the Conqueror) by the son of Peter Jeffrey; dissolved 1536; granted to Richard Hill, Esq., Sergeant of the King's Cellar 1538/9; 18th-century Wintney Farmhouse on site	Priory of the Blessed Virgin and St Mary Magdalene, Wintney ____________________; Winteney Priory	51°17′27″N 0°53′15″W

== See also ==
- List of monastic houses in England
