= List of monastic houses in Oxfordshire =

Locations of monastic houses in Oxfordshire
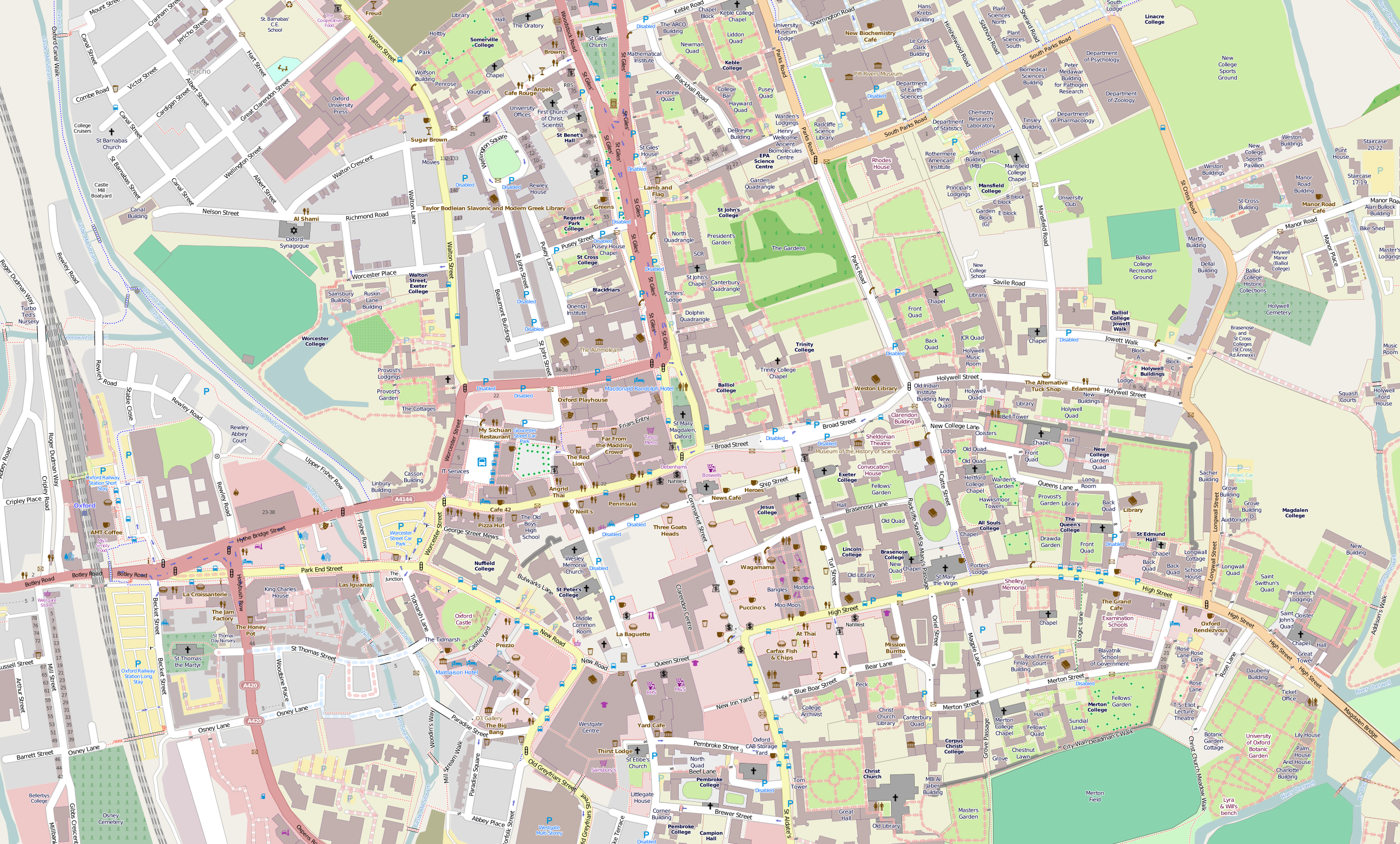
Locations of monastic houses in Oxford

The following is a list of the monastic houses in Oxfordshire, England.

Alien houses are included, as are smaller establishments such as cells and notable monastic granges (particularly those with resident monks), and also camerae of the military orders of monks (Knights Templar and Knights Hospitaller). Monastic hospitals are included where they had the status or function of an abbey, priory, or preceptor/commandery.

Abbreviations and key

Status of remains
Symbol	Status
None	Ruins
*	Current monastic function
^{+}	Current non-monastic ecclesiastic function (including remains incorporated into later structure)
^	Current non-ecclesiastic function (including remains incorporated into later structure) or redundant intact structure
^{$}	Remains limited to earthworks etc.
^{#}	No identifiable trace of the monastic foundation remains
^{~}	Exact site of monastic foundation unknown
^{≈}	Identification ambiguous or confused

Locations with names in italics indicate possible duplication (misidentification with another location) or non-existent foundations (either erroneous reference or proposed foundation never implemented) or ecclesiastical establishments with a monastic name but lacking actual monastic connection.

Trusteeship
EH	English Heritage
LT	Landmark Trust
NT	National Trust

Foundation	Image	Communities & provenance	Formal name or dedication & alternative names	References & location
Abingdon Abbey ^		Saxon (Benedictine?) monks probably minster and abbey; (community supposedly founded by Hean, at Bagley Wood, near Sunningwell 675); transferred here 695; destroyed c.872 in raids by the Danes; Benedictine monks founded c.954 (950); dissolved 9 February 1538; remains incorporated into town buildings; in local authority and trust ownership with public access to church	The Abbey Church of the Blessed Virgin Mary, Abingdon	51°40′14″N 1°16′31″W
Barton Cell		Augustinian Canons Regular ?cell, dependent on Oseney; possibly an estate without resident canons		
Bicester Priory		Augustinian Canons Regular founded 1182-5, endowed by Gilbert Basset, Baron of Hedington; dissolved 1536; granted to Charles, Duke of Suffolk 1538/9	St Edburga ____________________; Burchester Priory	51°53′42″N 1°09′09″W
Bruern Abbey ^{#}		Cistercian monks — from Waverley, Surrey; founded 1147; dissolved 1536; granted to Sir Antony Coke 1610/1; site now occupied by 18th century private house named 'Bruern Abbey'	The Abbey Church of Saint Mary of the Heath of Tretone, Bruern ____________________; Brueria Abbey; Bruerne Abbey	51°51′27″N 1°38′46″W
Burford Priory ^		Hospital of St John the Evangelist founded 13th century dissolved 1538; restored 1637; Anglican Benedictine founded 1901; sold off 2008; now in use as a country house, incorporating remains of the medieval hospital	Priory of Our Lady, Burford ____________________; The Priory	51°48′33″N 1°38′20″W
Caversham Cell		Augustinian Canons Regular status unknown, dependent on Notley, Buckinghamshire; founded 1162; dissolved c.1538		
Charlton on Otmoor Priory		Benedictine monks alien house: grange dependent on St Evroul; founded 1086 (1081) by Hugh Grentemoisnil; dissolved 1414; granted to Sir Thomas White and others	Charleton Priory	
Charney Manor ^{~}		Benedictine Monks residential manor, chapel and farm; granted to Abingdon before 1066; range c.1280; leased as a manor house from 1494; remodelled/rebuilt 16th, 17th and 19th century; converted and in use as a hotel 20th century		51°38′52″N 1°27′01″W
Cholsey Abbey		Benedictine monks founded 986 by King Ethelred II probably destroyed in raids by the Danes 1006; dissolved; granted to Sir Francis Englefield; probable slight remains incorporated into medieval parish church	Cholsey Grange	51°34′44″N 1°09′32″W
Clanfield Preceptory		Knights Hospitaller founded before 1279; united to Quenington before 1433		51°42′58″N 1°35′46″W
Clanfield Cell		Sisters of the Order of St John of Jerusalem cell foundation unknown dissolved c.1180: transferred to Buckland, Somerset		
Clattercote Priory		Gilbertine canons hospital founded 1148-66, possibly by Robert de Chesney; hospital ceased before 1262; priory, refounded 1251-62; dissolved 1538(?); granted to Thomas Lee c.1559; site now occupied by a private house	St Leonard	52°08′21″N 1°19′56″W
Cogges Priory		Benedictine monks alien house: dependent on Fécamp; founded 1103 by Manasses Arsic; dissolved 1414; granted to Eton College	St Mary	51°47′04″N 1°28′40″W
Cold Norton Priory		Augustinian Canons Regular hospital of St George and church of St John the Evangelist founded 1148-58 by Avelina de Norton; dissolved 1507: no canons remaining; granted to St Stephen's, Westminster	The Priory Church of Saint John the Evangelist, Cold Norton	51°57′01″N 1°30′45″W
Coxwell Grange ^{#}		Cistercian Monks probably grange with chapel; founded 1205 (1204); dependent on Beaulieu, Hampshire; Court House Farm built on site 16th century; (NT)		51°38′38″N 1°36′45″W
Dorchester Abbey ^{+}		secular cathedral founded 634, new see of the West Saxons created; see transferred to Winchester 663 see of Mercia 670s; see restored after 869 (875); see transferred to Lincoln 1072; secular canons collegiate founded 1072: built on site of episcopal diocesan cathedral; dissolved c.1140 by Alexander, Bishop of Lincoln; Augustinian Canons Regular — Arroasian (?) founded c.1140 by Alexander, Bishop of Lincoln; dissolved 1536; granted to Edmond Ashfield 1544/5; restored by James Cranston c.1845, William Butterfield 1846-53, and George Gilbert Scott 1859-74; church continues in parochial use as the Parish Church of SS Peter and Paul	The Abbey Church of Saint Peter, Saint Paul and Saint Birinus	51°40′13″N 1°16′50″W
East Hendred Cell		Carthusian monks grange: manor and chapel dependent on Sheen, Surrey, (Greater London), but apparently grange status, possibly without resident monks		51°35′20″N 1°20′15″W
Eynsham Abbey		Benedictine monks founded 1005 by Æthelmar (Ailmer), Earl of Cornwall, on the site of 9th century church; destroyed and monks dispersed at the Norman Conquest, after 1066; restored before 1086 by Remigius, Bishop of Lincoln transferred to Stow, Lincolnshire 1091; returned c.1094-5; dissolved December 1539; granted to Sir Edward North and William Darcey 1543/4	St Mary (also St Andrew and St Eadburgh given) ____________________; Egnesham Abbey	51°46′41″N 1°22′31″W
Faringdon Abbey		Cistercian monks — from Cîteaux founded before 2 November 1203: manor granted to Citeaux by King John; transferred to Beaulieu, Hampshire 1204; monastic cell or grange early 13th century; probably merged with Coxford Grange; privately leased 1351; granted to Sir Francis Englefield	Saint Mary; Farendon Priory; Faringdon Minster	51°39′34″N 1°35′02″W
Godstow Abbey		Benedictine nuns with small community of Benedictine monks under a master attached to the nunnery founded by Easter 1133 by Ediva (Editha), widow of Sir William Launcelene, assisted by Henry I, built on land granted by John de St John; dissolved 17 November 1539; granted by Henry VIII to his physician, Dr George Owen before 1547	St Mary and St John the Baptist ____________________; Godeston Abbey	51°46′42″N 1°17′59″W
Goring Priory		Augustinian Canonesses founded 12th century (during the reign of Henry I) by Thomas de Druval who granted a church and land; dissolved 1539(?); granted to Charles, Duke of Suffolk c.1531; later granted to Sir Thomas Pope; part of conventual church in parochial use	The Priory Church of the Blessed Virgin Mary, Goring	51°31′20″N 1°08′24″W
Gosford Preceptory		Knights Hospitaller foundation unknown, land granted by Robert d'Oilly; dissolved c.1180(?); hospitallers' oratory/chapel built c.1234; united to Quenington before 1433; granted to Antony Stringer and John Williams 1542/3		
Gosford Cell		Sisters of the Order of St John of Jerusalem cell; foundation unknown dissolved c.1180: transferred to Buckland		
Helenstowe Nunnery, Abingdon		nuns founded c.675; site now occupied by St Helen's Church	The Church of the Holy Cross and Saint Helen, Helenstowe	
Littlemore Priory		Benedictine nuns founded before 1154 by Robert de Sandford; dissolved 1525, suppressed for Wolsey's college; granted to William Owen and John Bridges c.1539	St Mary, St Nicholas and St Edmund	51°42′59″N 1°12′42″W
Merton Preceptory		Knights Templar founded c.1156, granted by Simon, Earl of Northampton; dissolved c.1240(?), became a limb of Sandford		
Milton Cell		Benedictine monks purported cell dependent on Abingdon — evidence lacking		
Minchery Priory		Benedictine nuns site now occupied by Minchery Farm, also called 'The Priory and...?....'		
Minster Lovell Priory		Saxon minster Benedictine monks alien house: cell dependent on Ivry; founded c.1200-6, St Kenelm's Church granted to Ivry 1200; dissolved 1414 (1415); granted to Eton College 1441		51°47′48″N 1°32′14″W
Oddington Grange		Cistercian monks dependent on Thame; founded c.1141; possibly on the site of Otley Abbey		
Oseney Abbey		Augustinian Canons Regular priory founded 1129 by Robert d'Oilly (son of the Lord of Oxford) and his wife Edith; raised to abbey status c.1154; mitred abbey 1481; dissolved 17 November 1539; episcopal diocesan cathedral founded 1542: new see created; see transferred to Christ Church, Oxford 1546; fell into decay and demolished	St Mary ____________________; Oseney Priory; Aseney Priory; Osney Abbey	51°44′58″N 1°16′17″W
Otley Abbey		Cistercian monks dependent on Waverley, Surrey; founded 22 July 1137: land granted by Robert Gait; abandoned, transferred to Thame c.1141; Oddington Grange probably established on site (though possibly deserted village rather than monastic)	Ottley Abbey; Ottelei Abbey; Oddington Grange?	51°50′43″N 1°12′47″W (possible)
Oxford Austin Friars ^{#}		Austin Friars (under the Limit of Oxford) founded 1266-7; Henry III regarded as founder 1268; impoverished and ruinous at dissolved July 1538; Oxford Wadham College founded 1612 by Nicholas Wadham		51°45′21″N 1°15′16″W
Oxford Blackfriars — St Aldate's		Dominican Friars (under the Visitation of Oxford) founded 1221; transferred to new site (see immediately below) 1245	oratory: St Mary	
Oxford Blackfriars — St Ebbe's		Dominican Friars (under the Visitation of Oxford) (community founded at St Aldates (see immediately above) 1221); transferred here 1245; dissolved 1538		
Oxford Cathedral Priory ^{+}		Augustinian Canonesses founded c.727 by Didanus, petty king; destroyed in raids by the Danes c.874?; destroyed in raids by the Danes 1002; rebuilt; secular canons founded 1004; Augustinian Canons Regular — from Holy Trinity, Aldgate, Middlesex (Greater London) refounded 1122; dissolved April 1524, suppressed for Cardinal Wolsey's college; episcopal diocesan cathedral and college chapel founded 1546: see transferred from Oxney; extant	St Frideswide's Priory, Oxford	51°45′00″N 1°15′17″W
Oxford — Canterbury College		Benedictine monks dependent on Canterbury; founded 1331 (1349) by Simon de Islip, Archbishop of Canterbury; lapsed; refounded 1363-70 by Archbishop Islip; secular 1365; constituted as a monastic college c.1368-70; dissolved c.1539; made part of Christ Church, Oxford 1546/7; rebuilt 1773		51°45′04″N 1°15′16″W
Oxford Crutched Friars		Crutched Friars founded 1342: licence granted to Crutched Friars of London 29 July 1342 to acquire land in Oxford; dwelling-place apparently moved a number of times; Bishop forbade completion of church began 1349; dissolved before 1362; property disposed of 1362		51°45′01″N 1°15′46″W
Oxford — Durham College		Benedictine monks priory cell dependent on Durham, County Durham; founded 1286-91, land purchased by Durham 1286, completed 1291; dissolved 1540; Trinity College founded on site 1554-5 by Sir Thomas Pope and his wife Elizabeth		51°45′19″N 1°15′26″W
Oxford Friars of the Sack		Friars of the Sack founded 1261-2; ruinous parish church of St Budoc acquired by the friars, becoming the conventual church; dissolved, granted to Franciscan Friars c.1309		51°45′04″N 1°15′41″W
Oxford — Gloucester College		Benedictine monks priory cell dependent on Gloucester, Gloucestershire; founded 1283, house granted by John Giffard; college founded 1291; dissolved 1538; Worcester College founded 1714 under the will of Sir Thomas Cookes	Glocester College; Glocester Hall	51°45′18″N 1°15′50″W
Oxford Greyfriars, earlier site		Franciscan Friars Minor, Conventual (under the Custody of Oxford) friars from Canterbury moved to Oxford via London, residing with the Dominicans for eight days in autumn 1224, then hired a house at St Ebbe's before transferred to new site (see immediately below) 1244-5		
Oxford Greyfriars		Franciscan Friars Minor, Conventual (under the Custody of Oxford) (community founded at St Ebbe's 1224) transferred here from earlier site (see immediately above) 1244-5: house and land granted to the townsmen for the friars' use by Richard the Miller; dissolved1538		51°45′02″N 1°15′45″W
Oxford — London College		purportedly Benedictine monks and secular college (in fact secular only) founded after 1421		
Oxford — St Albans Hall		Benedictine monks founded c.1140; part of Oxford — Gloucester College; now part of Merton College		51°45′04″N 1°15′08″W
Oxford, St Bernard's College		Cistercian monks abbey, founded 1437 (1436) by Henry Chichele, Archbishop of Canterbury, who granted land; dissolved 1540; refounded as St John's College during the reign of Mary	St Mary and St Bernard	
Oxford, St Mary's College		Augustinian Canons Regular priory, founded 1435 by Thomas Holden and his wife Elizabeth; dissolved 1540		
Oxford Trinitarian Priory, earlier site		Trinitarians founded before 1286: granted by Edmund, Earl of Cornwall 1293; transferred to new site (see immediately below) c.1313	The Holy Trinity	51°45′07″N 1°14′52″W
Oxford Trinitarian Priory		Trinitarians community founded at earlier site (see immediately above) before 1286; transferred here c.1313 (site acquired before 1307); known as 'Trinity Hall' from late-15th century, apparently dependent on Moatenden; dissolved 1538	The Holy Trinity	51°45′09″N 1°14′57″W
Oxford Whitefriars, earlier site		Carmelite Friars founded 1256: site granted by Nicholas de Meules (de Molis); transferred to new site (see immediately below) 1317-18; incorporated into the Benedictines' college, Oxford — Gloucester College, until the Dissolution 1538		51°45′16″N 1°15′50″W
Oxford Whitefriars		Camelite Friars (community founded at earlier site (see immediately above) 1256); transferred here 1317-18 by Edward II to his manor, 'the Palace of Beaumont', together with the friars at Sheen, Surrey (Greater London); dissolved 1538; demolished 16th century	The King's Hall; the Palace of Beaumont	51°45′18″N 1°15′44″W
Pheleley Priory		Benedictine monks founded after 1100 (during the reign of Henry I); apparently connected with Tewkesbury, but assigned by Tewkesbury as a cell to Eynsham; annexed to /transferred to Eynsham after c.1145	Phelely Priory	51°52′41″N 1°25′55″W (possible)
Rewley Abbey		intended as a secular establishment by King Richard; Cistercian monks dependent on Thame; founded 11 December 1143 by Edmund, Earl of Cornwall; dissolved c.1536; granted to the Dean and Chapter of Christ Church, Oxford 1546/7		51°45′16″N 1°16′05″W
Sandford Preceptory		Knights Templar founded c.1240: lands granted to Temple Cowley by Thomas the younger, of Sandford; transferred from Temple Cowley; dissolved 1308-12; Knights Hospitaller transferred after 1312; dissolved 1371: incorporated into the camerae of the prior of England; becoming a farmhouse; granted to Edward Powell 1541/2 remnants now in use as part of a Four Pillars Hotel	Sandford-on-Thames Preceptory; Saunford Hospital	51°42′46″N 1°13′53″W
Sibford Camera		Knights Templar founded before(?)1185; dissolved 1312		52°01′49″N 1°29′29″W
Steventon Priory		Benedictine monks alien house: dependent on St-Mary-du-Pré, Rouen and Bec-Hellouin, Normandy founded 12th century (during the reign of Henry I) manor granted to St Mary de Pre (St Mary de Prato, called Bonne-Nouvelle), Rouen, a dependent of Bec-Hellouin; farmed out 1378; dissolved 1389; granted to Westminster Abbey by Richard II; officially a priory but actually a grange no monastic church prior's house now in private ownership with public access by appointment (NT)	Stenington Priory	51°37′08″N 1°19′42″W
Studley Priory		Benedictine nuns founded 12th century by Bernard of Walery (de St Walerico); dissolved 1536 (apparently suppressed), 19 November 1539 (surrendered); granted to John Croke 1539/40; converted into an Elizabethan manor house; now in use as the Studley Priory Hotel	St Mary ____________________; Stodeley Priory	
Temple Cowley Preceptory		Knights Templar founded 1136 by Queen Matilda; transferred to Temple Cowley c.1240 and thereafter reduced to status of camera		51°43′55″N 1°12′17″W
Thame Abbey		Cistercian monks transferred from Otley; dependent on Waverley, Surrey; (founded at Otley 22 July 1137); transferred here c.1140: site granted by Alexander, Bishop of Lincoln; dissolved 1539; granted to Edward, Duke of Somerset c.1547; remains incorporated into 18th century country house	Tame Abbey	51°43′39″N 0°57′49″W
Wallingford Priory ^{#}		Benedictine monks cell of St Albans, Hertfordshire founded 1097 or 1088 (1077-93, 1087-9) by Robert D'Oyley or Gilfrid, Abbot of St Alban; dissolved 1525(-8) by Cardinal Wolsey to fund Ipswich College; granted to John Norres c.1546;	The Priory Church of the Holy Trinity, Wallingford ____________________; Wallingford Cell; Waring Cell	51°36′05″N 1°07′35″W
Wroxton Abbey		Augustinian Canons Regular founded c.1217 by Magister Michael Belet dissolved c.1537 (1536); granted to Sir Thomas Pope who gave part to Trinity College, Oxford; scant remains incorporated into mansion called 'Wroxton Abbey' built on site 1618	The Priory Church of St Mary, Wroxton ____________________; Wroxton Priory	52°04′17″N 1°23′37″W
Westcot Camera		Knights Templar founded 13th century (during the reign of Henry III): holdings granted by Robert Achard; dissolved 1308-12; Knights Hospitaller transferred 1308-12	Westcott Camera	51°34′52″N 1°30′38″W
Wytham Abbey ^{#}		nuns — from Helenstow; purportedly transferred here after 700; dispersed to other houses during hostilities c.780;		51°46′08″N 1°20′05″W

== See also ==
- List of monastic houses in England
