= Baddesley =

Baddesley may refer to:

- Baddesley Clinton, Warwick - a moated manor house
- Baddesley Ensor, Warwickshire
- North Baddesley, Hampshire
  - Baddesley Preceptory
- South Baddesley, Hampshire
