= Culmer =

Culmer is an English surname, a variation of Colmer. Notable people with the surname include:

- Henry Lavender Adolphus Culmer, British-American painter
- John Culmer (1891–1963), Miami minister and civil rights leader
- Kaiwan Culmer (born 1996), Bahamian athlete
- Richard Culmer (1597–1662), may have been the eldest son of Sir Henry Culmer (c. 1574–1633), the first Baron Culmer
- Wil Culmer (1957–2003), Major League Baseball player for the Cleveland Indians
- William Culmer, the namesake of the William Culmer House, United States
