= Lewisham Priory =

Monastery in Kent / Greater London, England

Coordinates: 51°27′6″N 0°1′2″W

- Lewisham Priory
- OS grid reference: TQ 37868 74384
- Location: London
- Country: England

Lewisham Priory was a Benedictine monastic house in Lewisham, Kent (now London), England.

In 918 Elftrudis otherwise Ælfthryth, countess of Flanders, granted Lewisham, Greenwich and Woolwich, to St Peter's Abbey in Ghent. The priory, a dependency of St. Peter's Abbey and thus an alien priory, was founded in the same year.

The priory was dissolved and its possessions confiscated, like all alien priories, under the Act of 1414 by Henry V, who re-granted them to his new foundation, the Carthusian monastery Sheen Priory in Surrey.

The location of the medieval Lewisham Priory is unknown but has been suggested to be either next to St Mary's church, at Priory Farm (around the Catford section of the South Circular), or on the High Street where the 17th-century mansion of the same name was later built (now Albacore Crescent south of the hospital).
