= St Cross Priory =

Monastery on the Isle of Wight, England

St Cross Priory was an alien priory in Newport on the Isle of Wight, England. It was founded in about 1120 by monks from the Benedictine Abbey of Tiron. It was dissolved in 1391 when the priory was ceded to Winchester College. Thereafter, the buildings were repaired and a new water mill wheel was bought. Only ruins remain. The nearby St Cross Mill is a 19th-century structure built on the foundations of the monastic mill.
