= List of monastic houses on the Isle of Wight =

Locations of monastic houses on the Isle of Wight

The following is a list of the monastic houses on the Isle of Wight in England.

Alien houses are included, as are smaller establishments such as cells and notable monastic granges (particularly those with resident monks), and also camerae of the military orders of monks (Knights Templar and Knights Hospitaller). Monastic hospitals are included where they had the status or function of an abbey, priory, or preceptor/commandery.

Abbreviations and key

Status of remains
Symbol	Status
None	Ruins
*	Current monastic function
^{+}	Current non-monastic ecclesiastic function (including remains incorporated into later structure)
^	Current non-ecclesiastic function (including remains incorporated into later structure) or redundant intact structure
^{$}	Remains limited to earthworks etc.
^{#}	No identifiable trace of the monastic foundation remains
^{~}	Exact site of monastic foundation unknown
^{≈}	Identification ambiguous or confused

Locations with names in italics indicate possible duplication (misidentification with another location) or non-existent foundations (either erroneous reference or proposed foundation never implemented) or ecclesiastical establishments with a monastic name but lacking actual monastic connection.

Trusteeship
EH	English Heritage
LT	Landmark Trust
NT	National Trust

Foundation	Image	Communities and provenance	Formal name or dedication and alternative names	References and location
Appuldurcombe House, Wroxall		Benedictine monks alien house dependent on Montebourg; founded c.1100: manor granted by Richard de Redvers to Montebourg Abbey before 1090; dissolved 1414; 16th century Elizabethan house built on site; hotel 1859; leased for use as a college for young gentlemen 1867-1890s; Benedictine monks founded 1901–1908; virtually abandoned 1909; used to accommodate troops in the two World Wars; damaged by a mine 1943; currently a shell internally in ruins; (EH)	St Mary	50°37′01″N 1°14′01″W
Barton Priory		Augustinian Canons Regular — from Cambridge priory(?) founded 1275 by John Insula, Rector of Shalfleet and Thomas de Winton, Rector of Godshill; dissolved 1439; granted to Winchester College	The Holy Trinity; Barton Oratory; Burton College	50°44′50″N 1°15′52″W
St Mary's Priory, Carisbrooke^{#}		Cistercian monks alien house: priory cell dependent on Lire Abbey; founded c.1156 by Baldwin de Redvers: granted to Lire by William fitz Osbern, Marshall of William the Conqueror; granted to Mount Grace, Yorkshire, by Richard II; Benedictine monks restored by Henry IV; dissolved 1414; granted to the Carthusians at Sheen, Surrey by Henry V	The Priory Church of Saint Mary the Virgin, Carisbrooke	50°41′31″N 1°18′50″W
Carisbrooke Priory *		Dominican nuns currently owned by the Carisbrooke Priory Trust, a registered charity; extant	The Open Door	50°41′09″N 1°18′27″W
Newport Whitefriars?		Carmelite Friars (Note: Newport Whitefriars: only reference Bale: K. Egan, The Establishment and early Development of the Carmelite Order in England (PhD thesis, Cambridge 19665) citing B.M., Ms Cotton Titus D. X. f.128; B.M., MS. Harley p.539, f.144)		
Quarr Abbey		Savignac monks founded 27 April 1132 by Baldwin de Redvers (Redveriis); Cistercian monks orders merged 17 September 1147; dissolved 1536; granted to John and George Mills 1544/5	The Abbey Church of Our Lady of the Quarry; Quarrer Abbey	50°43′52″N 1°11′58″W
Quarr Abbey *, Binsted		Benedictine monks founded 24 May 1907 from Appuldurcombe House current house constructed from the ruined masonry of the former abbey; extant		50°43′53″N 1°12′17″W
St Cecilia's Abbey, Ryde * Appley House, Ryde		Solesmes nuns returned to France from exile Benedictine nuns daughter of Liege Abbey; founded at Ventnor 1882; transferred to Appley House 1922; priory attained abbey status 1926; aggregated into the Solesmes Community 1950; extant	Priory of the Peace of the Heart of Jesus; Abbey of the Peace of the Heart of Jesus (1926)	50°43′42″N 1°08′47″W
St Cross Priory		Tironensian monks alien house: cell dependent Tiron; founded before 1132 (c.1120): church founded (in the tenure of Gervase, Abbot de Insula (Quarr)) by Robert Colaws; dissolved 1391; granted to Winchester College; site apparently occupied by a viaduct and railway		50°42′09″N 1°17′45″W
St Helen's Priory		Cluniac monks alien house: dependent on Wenlock, Shropshire; founded c.1090 (before 1155); dissolved 1414		50°42′05″N 1°05′57″W
Ventnor Priory, Steephill View		Benedictine nuns daughter of Liege Abbey, Belgium, founded 1882; transferred to Appley House, Ryde 1922; Steephill View house now demolished; Priory Lodge, built 1970, now occupies the site	Pax Cordis Jesu	50°35′43″N 1°12′49″W

== See also ==
- List of monastic houses in England
