= Wintney Priory =

- Interactive map of Wintney Priory

Monastery information
- Order: Cistercian nuns
- Established: late twelfth century
- Disestablished: 1536
- Dedication: The Blessed Virgin and St. Mary Magdalene

People
- Founders: Richard and Christine Holte
- Important associated figures: The Cobreth family

Site
- Location: Hartley Wintney, Hampshire, England
- Coordinates: 51.290855°N 0.887532°W
- Visible remains: none
- Public access: no

Wintney Priory was a priory of Cistercian nuns in Hartley Wintney, Hampshire, England.

== Foundation ==
The priory was founded in the 12th century, and was dedicated to the Blessed Virgin and St. Mary Magdalene. There is some uncertainty over the name of the founder: the obituary of the convent calendar states that Richard Holte and Christina his wife, the daughter of Thomas Cobreth, founded the house and Geoffrey Fitz Peter founded the first church. But Leland states that the founders were Roger Cobreth and his son Thomas. The Cobreth family clearly had close associations with the priory since various members were benefactors and one Dame Diana Cobreth had her heart buried before the high altar.

== 12th to 16th centuries ==
The original temporary church or chapel was replaced in 1234 by a stone church, founded by Richard de Herriard. Several other members of the de Herriard family were benefactors of the convent.

In 1316 the priory's finances were in a poor state due to "negligence and poor administration" and the nuns were dispersing since no provisions were being made for their food. This was perhaps related to the famines of 1315 and subsequent years. The Archbishop of Canterbury instituted a commission with full powers "to visit the nunnery and to inquire, correct, reform and punish the excesses of delinquents". This seems to have turned matters around by the 1320s. However, in 1398 and again in 1404 the priory was exempted from collection of the second moiety of the tenth "because it is a house of poor nuns heavily encumbered".

Occasionally the nunnery's superiors were termed abbesses rather than prioresses.

The church of St. Mary, Hartley Wintney, was included in the original endowment and the prioress and nuns presented the vicars till the Dissolution.

== Dissolution ==
On 23 May 1536 commissioners visited the priory of Wintney, "a hedde house of nuns, order of Cisteaux". They estimated its annual value at £52 5s. 8d. and found there ten nuns, "by reporte of good conversation, which trooly desieren to contynue in the same religion". There were also two priests, a waiting servant, thirteen hinds, nine woman servants, and two "corrodiers" with their two servants. The church and mansion were in good repair save the tiling, but the kitchen and brewhouse were in great decay.

The priory was surrendered on 22 July 1536.

== Post-Dissolution ==
A grant of the site and lands of the prioress was given to Sir William Poulet, comptroller of the king's household, in August 1536. In May 1538 "the house and site of the dissolved priory of Wintney, with the church, steeple and churchyard of the same, the manor and rectory of Hartley Wintney and all lands pertaining" were granted to Richard Hill and Elizabeth his wife. A letter of 1538 from Richard Poulet to Mr. Hill ordered him "in the name of the king's commissioners, to cease to deface any of the buildings of the late priory of Wintney besides those which the king had given him, which were only the cloister and the dorter".

== Present day ==
An 18th-century farmhouse, Wintney Farm, stands on the site of the priory. The old parish church of St. Mary, which was originally a substantial church of the 13th and 14th centuries, and hence extant when the convent existed, still remains.

== See also ==
- List of monastic houses in Hampshire
- List of monastic houses in England
