= Colmer =

Colmer is an Eglish surname of possible suggested origins, either native English toponymic surname derived from any places named Colmer, or an alteration of German Kollmer. Notable people with the surname include:

- Chris Colmer (1980–2010), American football player
- Dave Colmer (born 1945), Welsh badminton player
- David Colmer (born 1960), Australian writer
- Keith Colmer (born 1967), American test pilot
- Malcolm Colmer (1945–2024), Anglican priest
- Mickey Colmer (1918–2000), American football player
- William M. Colmer (1890–1980), American politician

== See also ==
- Colmar (also spelled Colmer), Haut-Rihn, France
- Culmer
- Colmer's Hill, Dorset, England
- James Colmer, English department store
