= Andover Priory =

Priory in Andover, Hampshire, England

- Interactive map of Andover Priory

Monastery information
- Full name: Priory of Andover
- Order: Benedictine
- Established: post 1066
- Disestablished: 1414
- Mother house: St. Florent, Saumur
- Controlled churches: St. Mary, Andover; Foxcote

People
- Founder: William I of England

Site
- Location: Andover, Hampshire, England
- Coordinates: 51.210103°N 1.478321°W
- Visible remains: one wall beside the current church
- Public access: yes

Andover Priory was an alien priory of Benedictine monks in Andover, Hampshire, England.

== Foundation ==
After the conquest, William I bestowed several gifts on the Benedictine abbey of Abbey of Saint-Florent de Saumur, including the church of Andover, with a hide and 14 acres (57,000 m^{2}) of land, tithes of all the demesne lands in the parish, and extensive pasture rights, with wood for fuel, for fencing and for building purposes. The gift was renewed by William Rufus in 1100, he also directed that all churches built under the mother church of Andover should either be utterly destroyed or held by the monks of St. Florent. The abbey established the priory with a colony of monks soon after the church was given to them. The homes of the monks are described as being juxta ecclesiam (beside the church).

== An Alien Priory ==
As an alien priory (i.e., the dependency of a French mother-house) Andover would have had a certain inbuilt instability of status before the English crown, especially whenever there were hostilities between France and England, and particularly during the Hundred Years' War. Its fate would have shared the fluctuating fortunes of every alien priory.

At the dissolution of alien priories in 1414 the priory was granted to Winchester College. The college was obliged to pay yearly pensions of forty-five marks to the Crown, twenty marks to Joanna of Navarre, the widow of Henry IV and fifty-two marks to the ex-prior, Nicholas Gwyn.

A piece of ivy-covered wall next to the present parish church is believed to be the only surviving remnant of the priory.
