= Pheleley Priory =

Monastery in Oxfordshire, England

Coordinates: 51°52′41″N 1°25′55″W

Pheleley Priory was a small 12th-century Benedictine monastic community located in a detached part of Bloxham, near Charlbury, in the English county of Oxfordshire. It was a cell of Eynsham Abbey that developed from a hermitage. It never had a priory church and only ever housed a few monks. It merged with Eynsham in 1145.
