= Selborne Priory =

Priory of Augustinian canons in Selborne, England

- Interactive map of Selborne Priory

Monastery information
- Full name: Priory of St Mary, Selborne
- Order: Augustinian canons
- Established: 1233
- Disestablished: 1485

People
- Founder: Peter des Roches

Site
- Location: Selborne, Hampshire, England
- Coordinates: 51.10393°N 0.92261°W
- Visible remains: some earthworks
- Public access: no

Selborne Priory was a priory of Augustinian canons in Selborne, Hampshire, England.

== Foundation ==
The priory was founded in 1233 by Peter des Roches, Bishop of Winchester. The bishop initially endowed the priory with lands obtained by gift from James de Acangre, James de Norton, and King Henry III. The canons had the manor of Selborne with all its privileges and the churches of Selborne, Basing and Basingstoke. The foundation was confirmed by Pope Gregory IX in September, 1235.

== 13th to 15th centuries ==
The house acquired numerous small endowments over the years, but also various obligations such as the upkeep of the vicarages of the various churches. The original foundation was for fourteen canons but by the mid fifteenth century this number had fallen to just four and the priory was in serious debt.

== Dissolution ==
On 21 April 1478 the general chapter of the Augustinian Order authorised a visitation by the priors of Breamore and Tortington. And on 2 September 1484 Bishop Waynflete appointed a commission for the annexing of the priory to Magdalen College, Oxford. The evidence given to the commission showed that there were no canons in residence and the buildings were dilapidated. The decree of annexation was pronounced on 11 September 1484 and confirmed in 1485. The priory was dissolved by Wayneflete in 1486.

== Post-Dissolution ==
After the suppression, a chantry priest was maintained by Magdalen College at Selborne, to celebrate masses for the benefactors and founders of both college and priory. The muniments of the priory were transferred to the college and kept in the Founder's Tower. The chantry building remained intact until around 1550.

== Present day ==
No visible remains of the buildings can be seen above ground. Archaeological investigations were carried out in the 1960s and 1970s finding the remains of the church, cloister and other buildings. The complete surviving muniments are extensive.

== See also ==
- List of monastic houses in Hampshire

== Sources ==
- Doubleday, H. Arthur, ed. (1903). "Houses of Austin canons: The Priory of Selborne". A History of the County of Hampshire. Vol. 2. London: William Page. pp. 175–180 – via British History Online.
- The Buildings of England: Hampshire and the Isle of Wight, Nikolaus Pevsner and David Lloyd, 1967
- Baker, David; et al. (2014). Selborne Priory: Excavations 1953-71. Monograph. Vol. 12. Hampshire Field Club & Archaeological Society.
