= Bromhall Priory =

Priory in Sunningdale, Berkshire, England

Coordinates: 51.3905°N 0.6315°W

Bromhall Priory was a nunnery of Benedictine nuns at Sunningdale in the English county of Berkshire.

It was established in 1200 and when dissolved in 1524. An inquisition was held in 1522 into the lands of Bromhall Priory, where the prioress had resigned in September 1521 and left with two other nuns in December. The inquisition gave no explanation for the prioress's departure, but in 1524 Clement VII issued a bull suppressing the house, on account of the demerits of the nuns. It was described as a 'profane place' and the property was transferred by the Crown to St John's College, Cambridge.
