= Southwick Priory =

Priory in Southwick, Hampshire, England

- Interactive map of Southwick Priory

Monastery information
- Full name: Our Lady of Southwick
- Established: 1133
- Disestablished: 7 April 1538

People
- Founder: Henry I

Site
- Location: Portchester and Southwick, Hampshire, England
- Visible remains: Church at Portchester, one wall and earthworks at Southwick
- Public access: To churches

Southwick Priory or Our Lady at Southwick (/ˈsʌðɪk/) was a priory of Augustinian canons founded in Portchester Castle on Portsmouth Harbour and later transferred 2 miles (3.2 km) north to Southwick, Hampshire, England. It ceased at the Dissolution of the Monasteries in 1538.

== Foundation ==
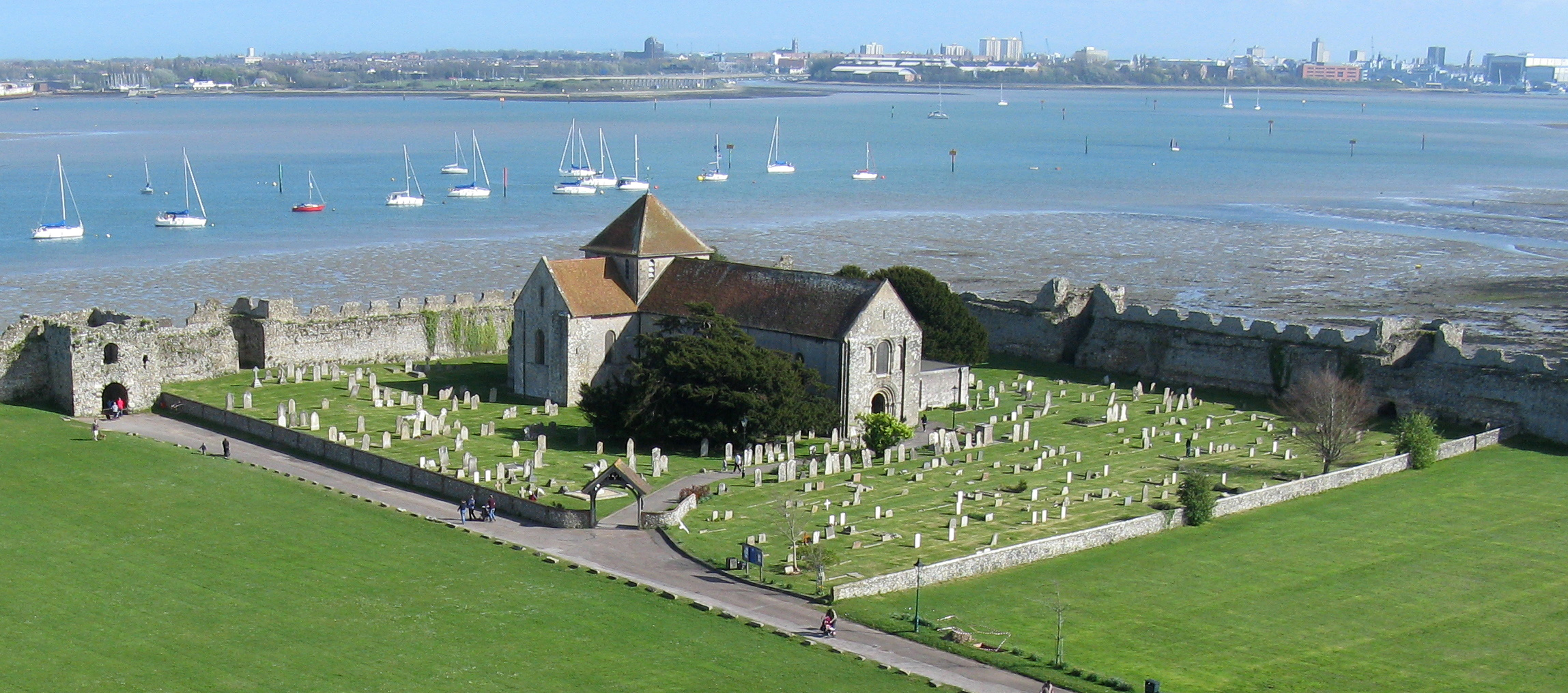
St Mary's Church within Portchester Castle is all that survives from the original Portchester Priory.

In 1133 Henry I founded a priory of Austin canons in the church of St. Mary, Portchester, within the walls of Portchester Castle. The foundation charter gave to the canons the church of Portchester, timber for fencing, building and fuel, common pasture in the wood of Hingsdon; the large manor of Candover; and a hide of land in 'each of' Southwick and Applestead. By the early part of the thirteenth century, the priory is referred to in charters (held at Lambeth Palace) as Southwick Priory and it is believed to have moved to the site in Southwick c. 1145–1153.

== 13th to 16th centuries ==
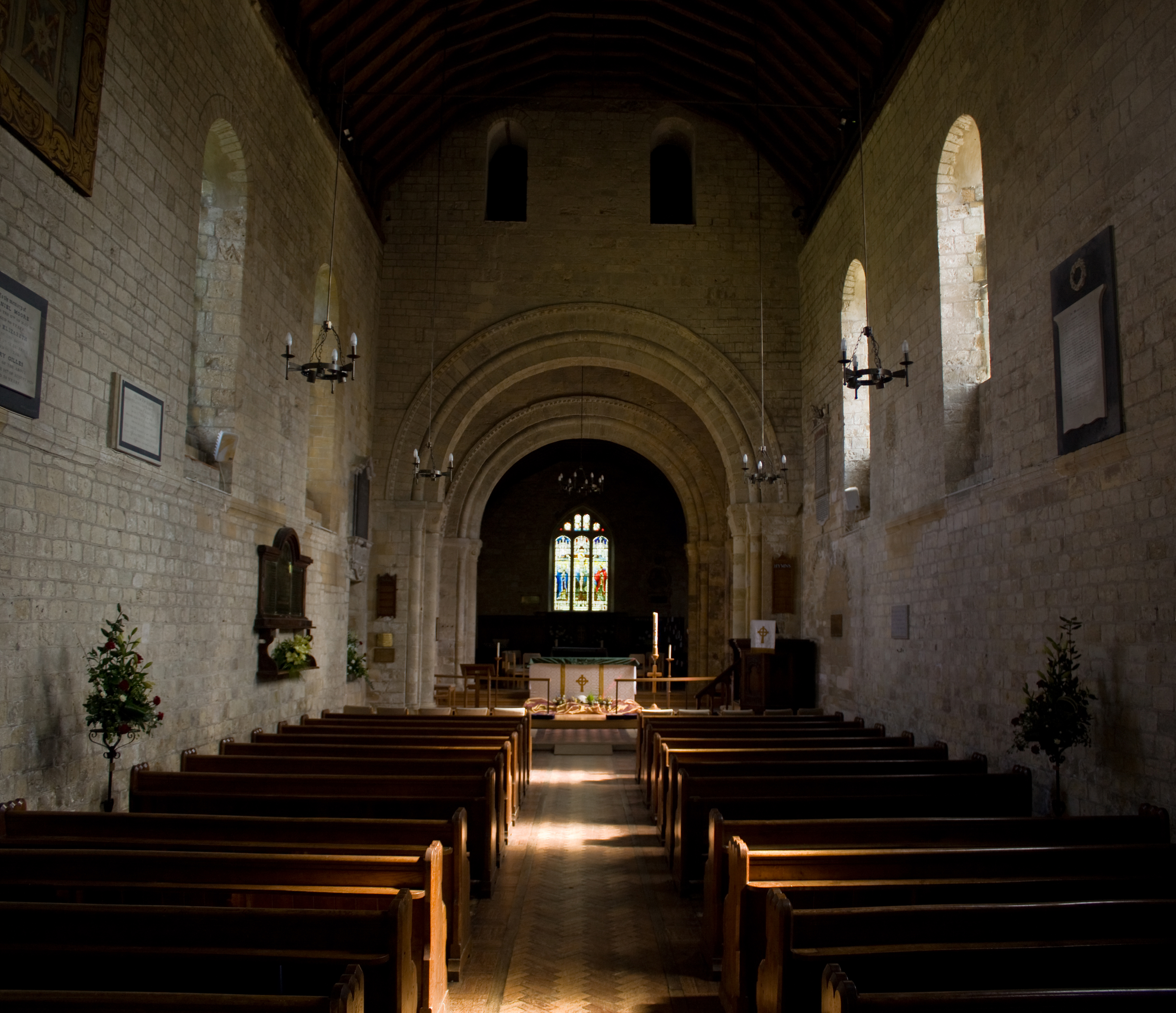
The interior of the church

Towards the end of the Middle Ages, the priory became a renowned centre of pilgrimage. In September 1510 Henry VIII passed through Southwick and made an offering of 6s. 8d. at Our Lady of Southwick. In 1538, shortly before the suppression, John Husee, a solicitor and servant of the Lisle family, wrote to Lord Lisle that Pilgrimage saints goeth down apace as Our Lady of Southwick, the Blood of Hales, St. Saviour's and others. And Leland mentions the fame of the pilgrimage to Our Lady of Southwick.

By the dissolution, the priory still holding Preston Candover had gained:

- the manors (almost all in Hampshire) of Southwick with its rectory, Newland, Hannington, Sutton Scotney, 'Moundesmer', 'Oldfishborne', Farlington with a fishery, Denmead Molens, Clanveld and Aldbourn, Weralles in Dorchester with the rectory, Colmer, Stubbington, Hoe, West Boarhunt, Boarhunt, Harbert and Bury
- the rectories of Nutley, Swindon, Portsea, Portsmouth and 'Wanstede,'
- lands and rents in Priors Dean, the city of Winchester and Andover.

Several of the manors of Southwick Priory and Breamore Priory were included in the dower lands of Anne of Cleves in 1540.

== Dissolution ==
In 1535, the Valor Ecclesiasticus estimated the annual value (net income) of the priory as £257 4s. 4d (equivalent to £190,840 in 2025). But one of the canons, James Gunwyn, wrote to Thomas Cromwell on 20 January 1536 claiming:

We are bound by the will of William Wykeham to have daily five masses in our church, which have not been said for more than forty years. On 26 May last the Commissioners sat in our place to ascertain the yearly value of our lands, that a tenth part might be assessed according to Act of Parliament, when my master (the prior) delivered them a book of the yearly rents which was not in all points made truly. Also on 22 September last we had a visitation of our house by Dr. Layton, when we had certain injunctions given us to be observed, several of which have been neglected hitherto. I send you this information in discharge of my oath of obedience, and would have done it earlier if I could have had a trusty messenger, for if my master knew of my writing he would convey away the plate, money and jewels in his keeping.

A letter to Lord Lisle of 16 March 1538 stated that the priory was to be suppressed, and that 'Our Lady of Southwick' was taken down. On 7 April 1538 the surrender was signed by the prior, William Norton, and twelve of the canons. James Gunwyn's signature is next to the prior's.

Prior Norton received the large pension of £66 13s. 4d.

== Post-Dissolution ==
The priory came into the possession of John White, a servant of Thomas Wriothesley, 1st Earl of Southampton. He pulled down the church and converted the prior's lodgings and other parts of the conventual buildings into a private house, known as Southwick Park, which became the family seat of one branch of the Norton family. In October 1551, Mary of Guise, mother of Mary, Queen of Scots, stayed in the house.

On the death of John White in 1567 the manor passed to his son and heir Edward. In 1580 Edward died, leaving a son and heir, John, White (d. 1606). Elizabeth I stayed on 30 August 1591 and rode to Portchester Castle the next day.

In 1606 John White settled the manor on his daughter and co-heir Honor on her marriage with Sir Daniel Norton, and they came into possession of the manor on the death of John White in the following year.

== Twin ruins and mansion on main estate ==
The church of St Mary at Portchester survives, inside the Roman wall of Porchester Castle, returned to parochial use. It is substantially a Norman building, and hence the one the priory originally used. No trace of the conventual buildings survive above ground except for some drain openings and the marks of the abutment of the cloister against the south wall of the nave.

The house that used materials from the priory was burnt down in 1750 and salvaged for scrap masonry. The site has been occupied since 1838 by Southwick House, which has been home to the Defence School of Policing and Guarding since 2005, and the regimental headquarters of the Royal Military Police since 2007.

Of the priory itself, one section of wall and some earthworks survive. Some remnants of the priory church may survive transferred and reset in the parish church of St James, Southwick. The contiguous estate at Southwick is still intact and is formally referred to as the Southwick Estate.

== See also ==
- List of English abbeys, priories and friaries serving as parish churches
