= William Culmer House =

Historic house in Salt Lake City, Utah, U.S.

- U.S. National Register of Historic Places
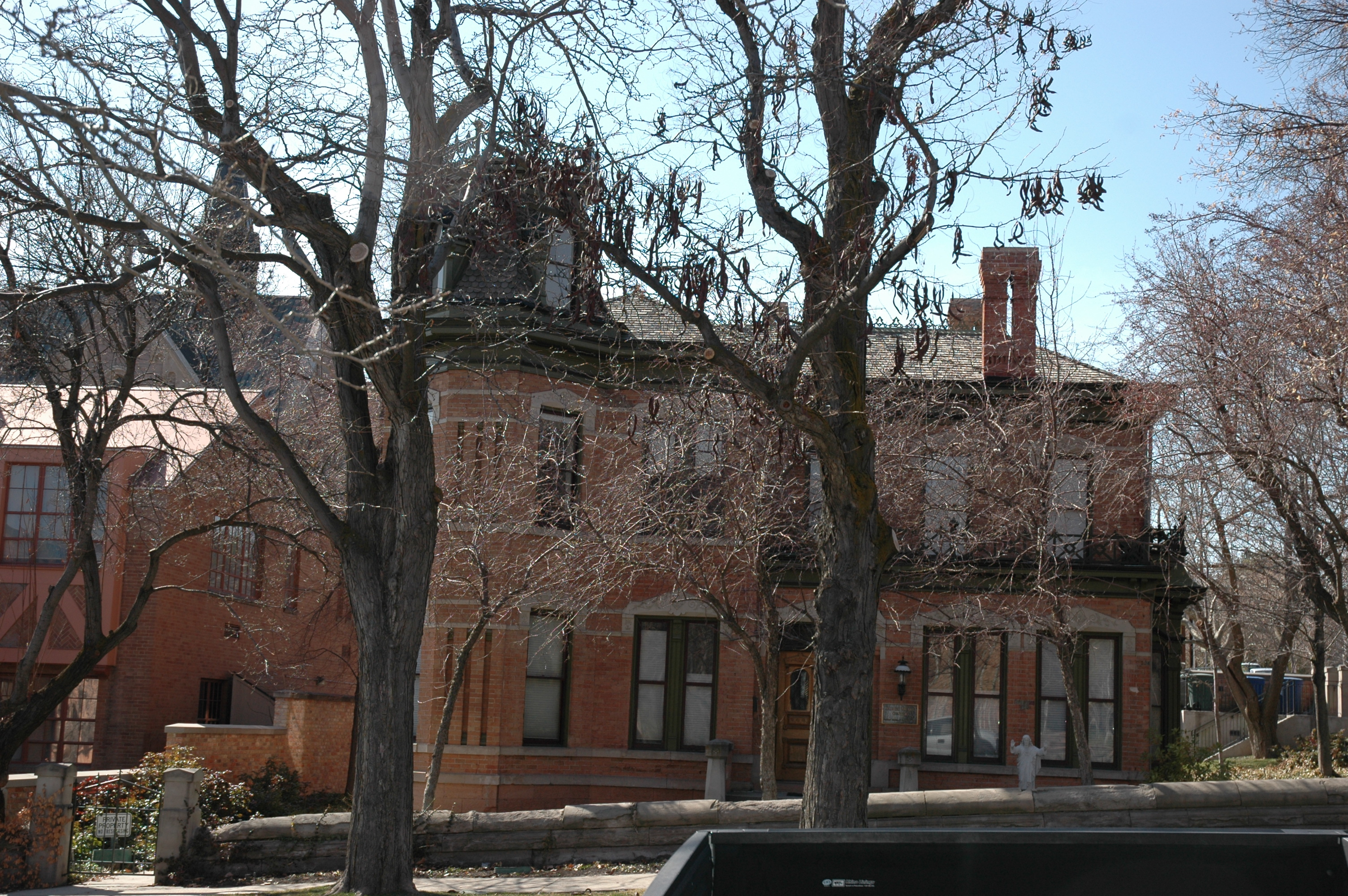

- Location within Utah Location within the United States
- Location: 33 C St., Salt Lake City, Utah
- Coordinates: 40°46′14″N 111°52′43″W
- Area: less than one acre
- Built: 1881
- NRHP reference No.: 74001935
- Added to NRHP: April 18, 1974

The William Culmer House, at 33 C St. in Salt Lake City, Utah, United States, was built in 1881. It was built for William Culmer, a successful businessman who had immigrated from England. It was listed on the National Register of Historic Places in 1974.

It currently serves as the Sacred Heart Center of the Roman Catholic Diocese of Salt Lake City.
