= Ellingham Priory =

Priory in Ellingham, Hampshire, England

Coordinates: 50.874242°N 1.796222°W

Ellingham Priory was a medieval monastic house in Ellingham, Hampshire, England. It was founded by William de Soleres in 1160. It was a cell to the Abbey of Saint-Sauveur-le-Vicomte in Normandy. The church of Ellingham formed part of the grant of William de Solers to Ellingham Priory.

It was dissolved in 1414 and sold to Eton College in 1462.
