= Carmelite Friary, Winchester =

Friary in Hampshire, England

Coordinates: 51°3′59.31″N 1°20′15.41″W

The Carmelite Friary, Winchester was a friary in Hampshire, England. It was founded in 1278 and suppressed in the early sixteenth century.
