= Franciscan Friary, Winchester =

Friary in Winchester, Hampshire, England

Coordinates: 51°3′6.86″N 1°20′8.47″W

Franciscan Friary, Winchester was a friary dedicated to St. Francis in Hampshire, England. It was founded by Albert of Pisa in 1237 and dissolved in 1538. There are no remains but the location is thought to have been somewhere between Lower Brook Street and Middle Brook Street.
