= Breamore Priory =

Priory in Breamore, Hampshire, England

- Interactive map of Breamore Priory

Monastery information
- Full name: The Priory Church of the Holy Trinity, Saint Mary and Saint Michael, Breamore
- Other name: Bromere Priory
- Order: Austin Canons
- Established: pre. 1135
- Disestablished: 1536

People
- Founders: Baldwin de Redvers and Hugh de Redvers

Site
- Location: Breamore, Hampshire, England
- Coordinates: 50.97085°N 1.78419°W
- Visible remains: none visible
- Public access: to Breamore House and Breamore Countryside Museum

Breamore Priory was a priory of Austin canons in Breamore, Hampshire, England, until the Dissolution of the Monasteries in 1536.

== History ==
The priory was founded some time towards the end of the reign of Henry I (1100–1135) by Baldwin de Redvers and his uncle Hugh de Redvers.

In the 14th century, the Courtenay Compendium was created at Breamore.

At the time of the Dissolution, the last prior, Prior Finch, wrote at least twice to Thomas Cromwell proffering his service and that of his house, and desiring Cromwell's favour. But according to the Valor Ecclesiasticus of 1535 the annual value of the priory was £200 5s. 1 1/2d., together with two pounds of pepper. However after deducting alms and other obligatory outgoings of £45 11s., the annual value was only £154 14s. 1 1/2d. and the pepper. This brought the house well below the £200 limit for the first series of dissolutions, and it was surrendered on 10 July 1536.

Soon afterwards, in November 1536, the site of the priory and all its possessions were granted to Henry Courtenay, 1st Marquess of Exeter, and his wife Gertrude. Several of the manors of Breamore and Southwick Priory were included in the dower lands of Anne of Cleves in January 1540.

A large manor house, Breamore House, was built on the site in 1583.

== Present day ==
No above ground remains of the priory survive, although cropmarks can be seen on satellite imagery of the site.

== Burials ==
- Isabella de Forz, Countess of Devon (1237–1293)

== See also ==
- List of monastic houses in Hampshire
- List of monastic houses in England

== Sources ==
- A History of the County of Hampshire: Volume 2, The Victoria County History 1973
