= Baddesley Preceptory =

- Interactive map of Baddesley Preceptory

Monastery information
- Other names: Godsfield, Godesfield
- Order: Knights Hospitaller
- Established: pre. 1304
- Disestablished: 1540

Site
- Location: Godsfield, and later North Baddesley, Hampshire, England
- Coordinates: 51.12917°N 1.13914°W; 50.98745°N 1.41612°W
- Visible remains: chapel at Godsfield, no remains at North Baddesley

Baddesley Preceptory was a preceptory of the Knights Hospitaller at North Baddesley in Hampshire, England. The preceptory was founded at Godsfield but was moved soon after the Black Death.

== Foundation ==
Land in Godsfield, Hampshire was first granted to the Hospitallers by Henry of Blois, Bishop of Winchester in the time of King John and in 1207 further land there was given by Adam de Port. There were further grants of land in Preston Candover and Child Candover. It is not known when a preceptory was first formed, but it was prior to 1304.

== 12th to 16th centuries ==
By 1355 the preceptory had moved to Baddesley, although it was still sometimes called Godsfield. The establishment was small with only the Preceptor a chaplain and four servants. They held managed land and buildings in several places in Hampshire, including Godsfield, Baddesley, Rownhams and the former Knights Templar possessions at Temple.

== Dissolution ==
The Valor of 1535 lists the annual value of the preceptory as £131 14s. 1d.. It was suppressed in 1540 and the lands were granted first to Sir Thomas Seymour, and later, in 1551, to Sir Nicholas Throckmorton.

== Present day ==
The 14th century chapel and priest's house at Godsfield survive. Nothing remains of the preceptory at North Baddesley, the site being occupied by the 18th century Baddesley Manor.
