= Dominican Friary, Winchester =

Dominican priory in Hampshire, England

Coordinates: 51°5′26.82″N 1°20′35.40″W

The Dominican Friary, Winchester, otherwise Winchester Blackfriars, was a priory of the Dominican Order in Winchester, Hampshire, England. It was founded between 1231 and 1234, one of the earliest Dominican foundations in England.

The friary, dedicated to Saint Catherine, was situated in the High Street, near Eastgate, between the River Itchen and Busket Street.

It was dissolved in 1538 and like the other friaries of Winchester its property soon passed into the possession of Winchester College. The site has been fully re-developed and there are no visible remains.
