= Alien priory =

Medieval English religious houses not under English control

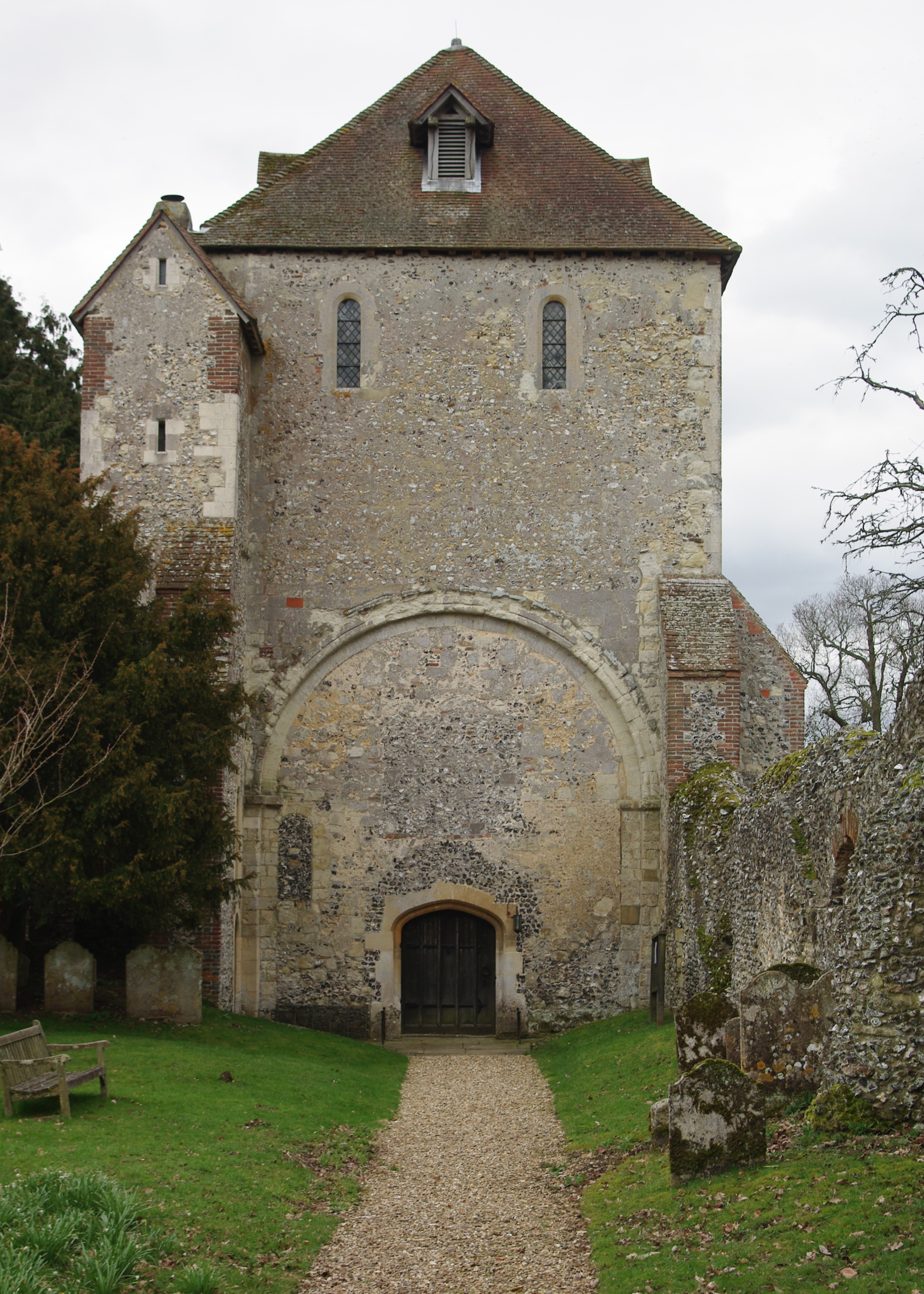
Pamber Priory in Hampshire, an example of an alien priory

Alien priories were religious establishments in England, such as monasteries and convents, which were under the control of another religious house outside England. Usually the mother-house was in France.

== History ==
Alien priories were small dependencies of foreign religious houses. Specifically, this pertained to property situated in England but owned by French religious houses.

The precedent went back at least as far as 912. Ælfthryth, daughter of Alfred the Great married Baldwin II, Count of Flanders. She received various properties under her father's will, and gave Lewisham Priory with its dependencies, Greenwich and Woolwich, to the abbey of St Peter at Ghent. Edward the Confessor gave the parish church at Deerhurst, and its lands to the monastery of St Denis.

The practice increased after the Norman Conquest. A number of Norman lords had founded monasteries on their lands in France, which in many cases sent monks to England to manage their property. William the Conqueror gave to the Abbey of Saint-Étienne in Caen, the manors of Frampton and Bincombe in Dorset. During the reign of William Rufus, Hamelin de Balun, founded the Benedictine priory of St Mary, at Abergavenny under the jurisdiction of the Abbey of Saint Vincent at Le Mans. The designation "Alien Priory" included any property owned by the French houses, regardless of whether there was an actual priory, or religious house, constructed upon it.

Some priories enjoyed more autonomy than others. A distinction was drawn between those where the prior was appointed and served at the will of the abbot of the motherhouse, and those where the prior was elected by the monks. In the latter case, the land was vested in the priory and could not be sold by the abbot. The priories paid an apport, a nominal fixed sum, annually to the mother-house.

A medieval abbey which held distant estates normally administered them by establishing a small cell or priory of two or three monks to manage a manor or group of manors and send the profits to the mother-house. King John compelled them to pay into the royal treasury the apport. During the reign of King Henry III (1216-1272), many alien priories were suppressed by Simon de Montfort's Parliament (the Parliament of Leicester, 1265), and their revenues were taken into the king's hands. The Crown, however, in most cases transferred the property to other monasteries.

In 1294, when King Edward I of England was at war with France, many of the alien priories were seized, numbering about a hundred, and their revenues were used to help pay for the war. In order to prevent the foreign monks in southern coastal areas giving possible help to invaders, he deported many of them to other religious houses that were twenty or more miles from the coast.

King Edward II of England subsequently followed this example, taking the alien priories into his own hands, but he not infrequently appointed their priors custodians for a consideration, obliging them to pay to the Crown the apport due to their superiors.

When Edward III came to the throne, he restored many of the alien priories to their original owners and waived the arrears of payments due to the Crown. But ten years later, when war broke out again with France, he reverted to the policy of his predecessors, and again seized the property of these French aliens. For twenty-three years, these foreign houses remained in his hands; but with the peace of 1361 most of them were restored, only to be again sequestrated eight years later when the war was renewed. In the time of Richard II, the alien priories continued mostly in the hands of the Crown.

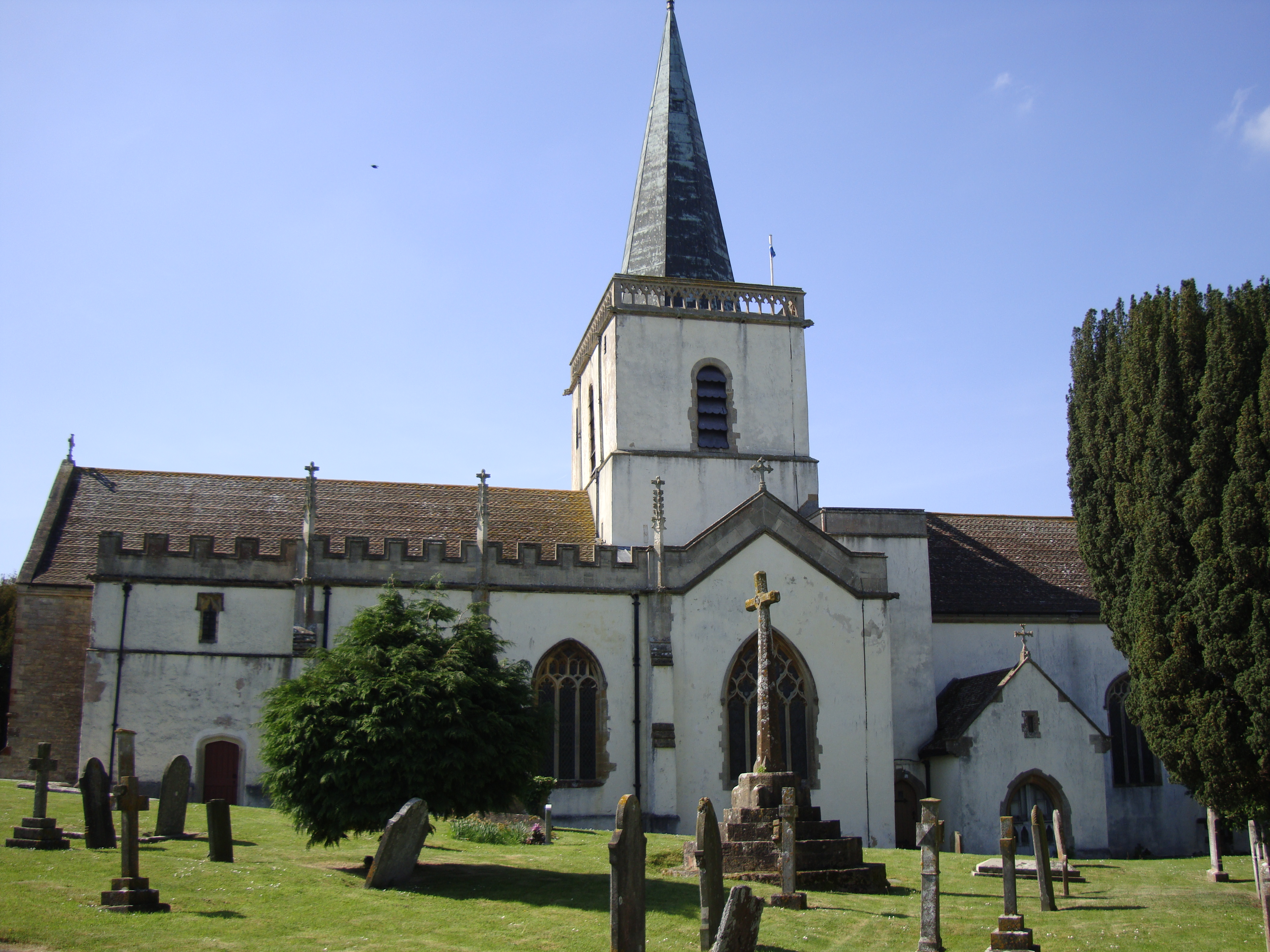
Stogursey Priory in Somerset. An alien priory dissolved in 1414 and granted to Eton College

After 1378, French monasteries (and alien priories dependent on them) maintained allegiance to the Avignon Papacy. Their suppression was supported by the rival Roman Popes, conditional on all confiscated monastic property being redirected into other religious uses. The king's officers first sequestrated the assets of the alien priories in 1295–1303 under Edward I, and the pattern repeated for long periods over the course of the 14th century, most particularly in the reign of Edward III.

In 1378, all the monks in alien priories were expelled from England. Most finally came to an end under Henry V in 1414, with a few exceptions surviving, for example Modbury Priory in Devon.

Owing to frequent wars between England and France in the late Middle Ages, successive English governments objected to money going overseas to France. They also objected to foreign prelates having jurisdiction over English monasteries.

== 15th century ==
Alien priories with functioning communities were forced to pay large sums to the king, while mere estates were confiscated and run by royal officers, the proceeds going to the king's pocket. Such estates were a valuable source of income for the Crown in its French wars. Most of the larger alien priories became naturalised (for instance Castle Acre Priory), on payment of heavy fines and bribes, but for around 90 smaller houses, their fates were sealed when Henry V dissolved them by act of Parliament in 1414.

The properties were taken over by the Crown; some were kept, some were given or sold to Henry's supporters, others were assigned to his new monasteries of Syon Abbey and the Carthusians at Sheen Priory; others were used for educational purposes. All these suppressions enjoyed papal approval but successive 15th-century popes continued to press for assurances that the confiscated monastic income would revert to religious uses.

The medieval understanding of religious houses as institutions associated monasteries and nunneries with their property: their endowments of land and income, and not their current personnel of monks and nuns. If the property with which a house had been endowed by its founder were to be confiscated or surrendered, then the house ceased to exist, whether its members continued in the religious life or not. The founder and their heirs had a legally enforceable interest in certain aspects of the house; their nomination was required at the election of an abbot or prior, they could claim hospitality within the house when needed, and they could be buried within the house when they died. In addition, though this scarcely ever happened, the endowments of the house would revert to the founder's heirs if the community failed or dissolved. The status of 'founder' was considered in civil law to be real property, and could consequently be bought and sold, in which case the purchaser would be called the patron. Like any other real property, in intestacy and some other circumstances the status of 'founder' would revert to the Crown—a procedure that many houses actively sought, as it might be advantageous in their legal dealings in the King's courts.

The founders of the alien priories had been foreign monasteries refusing allegiance to the English Crown. These property rights were therefore automatically forfeited to the Crown when their English dependencies were dissolved, but their example prompted questions as to what action might be taken should English houses cease to exist. Much would depend on who, at the time the house ended, held the status of founder or patron; as with other such disputes in real property, the standard procedure was to empanel a jury to decide between disputing claimants. In practice, the Crown claimed the status of 'founder' in all such cases that occurred. Consequently, when a monastic community failed (e.g., through the death of most of its members, or through insolvency), the bishop would seek to obtain papal approval for alternative use of the house's endowments in canon law. This, with royal agreement claiming 'foundership', would be presented to an 'empanelled jury' for consent to use of the property of the house in civil law.

The royal transfer of alien monastic estates to educational foundations inspired bishops and, as the 15th century waned, this practice was common. The subjects of these dissolutions were usually small, poor, and indebted Benedictine or Augustinian communities (especially those of women) with few powerful friends; the great abbeys and orders exempt from diocesan supervision such as the Cistercians were unaffected.

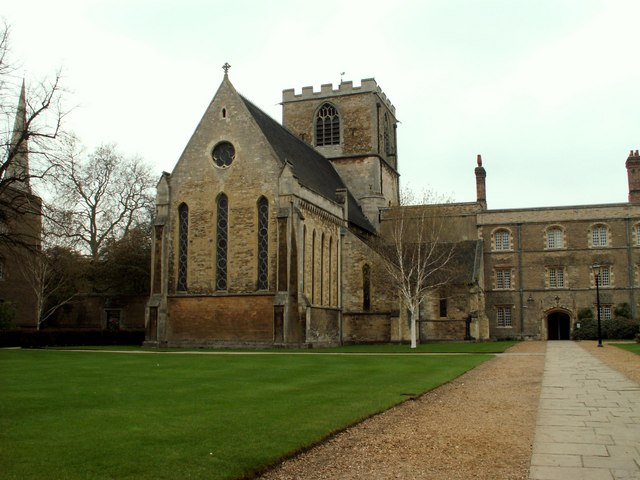
St Radegund's Priory, Cambridge; dissolved in 1496 and converted into Jesus College, Cambridge

The resources were transferred often to Oxford University and Cambridge University colleges: instances of this include John Alcock, Bishop of Ely dissolving the Benedictine St Radegund's Priory, Cambridge to found Jesus College, Cambridge (1496), and William Waynflete, Bishop of Winchester acquiring Selborne Priory in Hampshire in 1484 for Magdalen College, Oxford.

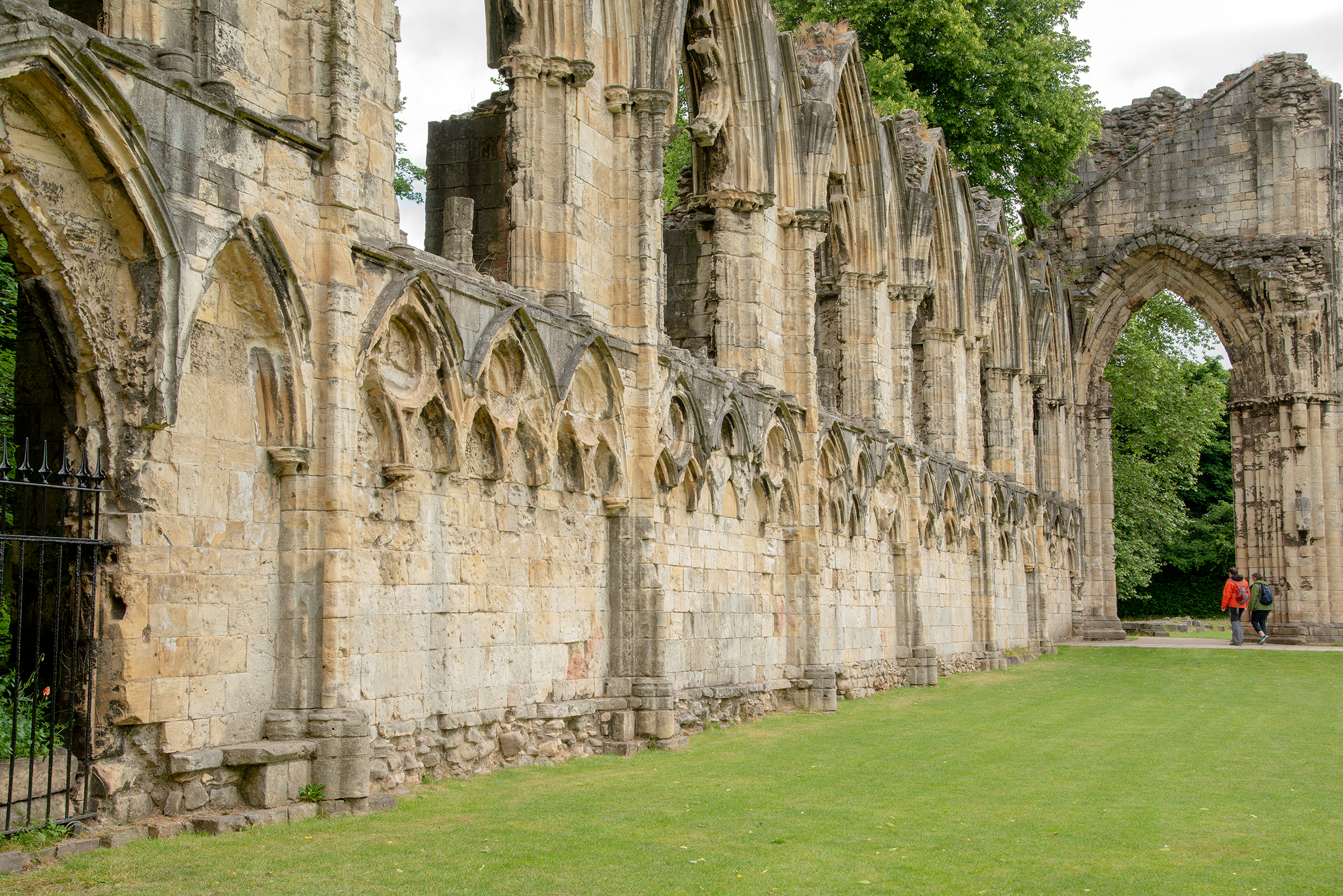
A portion of the ruins of St Mary's Abbey, York, founded in 1155 and destroyed c. 1539

Abolitions often faced strong resistance in practice. Members of religious houses proposed for dissolution might resist relocation; the houses invited to receive them might refuse to co-operate; and local notables might resist the disruption in their networks of influence. Reforming bishops found they faced opposition when urging the heads of religious houses to enforce their monastic rules, especially those requiring monks and nuns to remain within their cloisters. Monks and nuns in almost all late medieval English religious communities, although theoretically living in religious poverty, were paid an annual cash wage (peculium) and received other regular cash rewards and pittances, which softened claustral rules for those who disliked them. Religious superiors met their bishops' pressure with the response that the cloistered ideal was only acceptable to a tiny minority of regular clergy, and that any attempt to enforce their order's stricter rules could be overturned in counter-actions in the secular courts, if aggrieved monks and nuns obtained a writ of praemunire.

== 16th century ==
By the time Henry VIII turned to monastery reform, royal action to suppress religious houses had a history of more than 200 years; his innovation was in scale. The first case was that of the so-called 'alien priories'. As a result of the Norman Conquest of 1066, some French religious orders held substantial property through their daughter monasteries in England.

Some of these were granges, agricultural estates with a single foreign monk in residence to supervise; others were rich foundations in their own right (e.g., Lewes Priory was a daughter of Cluny and answered to the abbot of the French house).

In the following century, Lady Margaret Beaufort obtained the property of Creake Abbey (whose religious had all died of sweating sickness in 1506) to fund her works at Oxford and Cambridge. She was advised in this action by the staunch traditionalist John Fisher, Bishop of Rochester.

In 1522, Fisher himself dissolved the women's monasteries of Bromhall and Higham to aid St John's College, Cambridge. That same year, Cardinal Wolsey dissolved St Frideswide's Priory (now Oxford Cathedral) to form the basis of his Christ Church, Oxford; in 1524, he secured a papal bull to dissolve 20 other monasteries to provide an endowment for his new college. The remaining friars, monks and nuns were absorbed into other houses of their respective orders. Juries found the property of the houses to have reverted to the Crown as founder.

== See also ==
- Valor Ecclesiasticus
- Suppression of Religious Houses Act 1535
- Suppression of Religious Houses Act 1539
- Dissolution of the Monasteries

== Sources ==
- Coredon, Christopher (2007). A Dictionary of Medieval Terms & Phrases (Reprint ed.). Woodbridge: D. S. Brewer. ISBN 978-1-84384-138-8.
- "Ælfthryth (d.929)" . Dictionary of National Biography. London: Smith, Elder & Co. 1885–1900.
