= Faringdon Abbey =

Cistercian monastery in Oxfordshire, England

Coordinates: 51.659579°N 1.583995°W

Faringdon Abbey was a Cistercian abbey located at Wyke just north of the small town of Faringdon in the English county of Berkshire (now Oxfordshire).

The Royal manor of Faringdon was given to the Cistercian monks by King John in 1203 for the founding of an abbey. It was built at Wyke, a lost placename that was located just north of the town between the Radcot Road and Grove Wood. The abbey moved to Beaulieu in the New Forest a few months after it had been founded. However, it remained under the monks' control and the abbey site became one of their monastic granges.
