= North Baddesley =

Village and parish in Hampshire, England

Coordinates: 50.9779°N 1.4375°W

- Shops around Six Oaks Road, North Baddesley

- Location within Hampshire
- Population: 12,878; 6,823 (2011 Census)
- OS grid reference: SU395199
- Civil parish: North Baddesley
- District: Test Valley
- Shire county: Hampshire
- Region: South East
- Country: England
- Sovereign state: United Kingdom
- Post town: SOUTHAMPTON
- Postcode district: SO52
- Dialling code: 023
- Police: Hampshire and Isle of Wight
- Fire: Hampshire and Isle of Wight
- Ambulance: South Central
- UK Parliament: Romsey and Southampton North

North Baddesley is a large village and civil parish in Hampshire, England. It is situated 3 mi (5 km) east of the town of Romsey and 6 mi (10 km) north of Southampton. It occupies an area of approximately 9.15 km^{2} (3.53 sq mi), and is home to a population of just over 10,000 people, reducing to 7,000 at the 2011 Census. It is located in the Test Valley; a river famous for trout fishing.

== Location ==
Nearby towns and cities: Romsey, Southampton, Eastleigh, Winchester

Nearby villages: Rownhams, Chandler's Ford, Ampfield, Chilworth, Nursling

== History ==
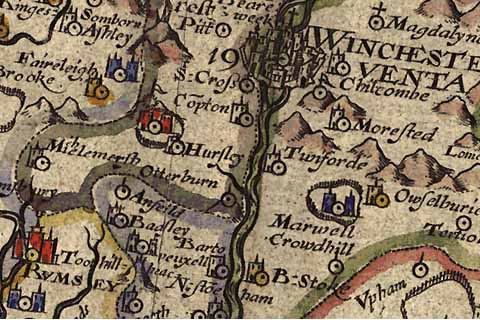
Map showing North Baddesley (Badley) dated 1607

The Domesday Book of 1086 shows North Baddesley or Badeslei as it was then called (ley meaning a wood, and Baed or Baeddi being a proper name, i.e. Baeddi's Wood) as a small hamlet with a church, four farms, seven smallholdings and a wood sufficient for ten hogs valued at 60 shillings (£3). The most notable event in North Baddesley's past was the arrival in the 12th century of the Knights of St John of Jerusalem, later known as the Knights Hospitaller, and their acquisition of the overlordship rights in the late 14th century. However, long before this, half the manor had already been transferred to the Knights as early as 1304, when the little church of All Saints was re-dedicated to St John the Baptist, the patron saint of Hospitallers. The church was almost opposite the Hospitallers preceptory, on the site now occupied by the present manor house. The Black Death of 1348–49 resulted in the transfer of the Hospitallers Hampshire headquarters from Godsfield near New Alresford to North Baddesley.

The Knights Hospitaller were a medieval order dedicated to the care and protection of pilgrims, and tending the sick and infirm, including the crusaders in their quest to return the Holy Land to the Christian world. A Europe-wide order, they became extremely large and wealthy landowners thanks to the patronage of rich and noble families.

The Knights Hospitaller were in Baddesley for about 400 years until 1541. Following the Dissolution of the Monasteries they were at odds with Henry VIII, as they still recognized the supremacy of Rome and were themselves suppressed. Their possessions were made forfeit to the crown.

After the departure of the Hospitallers, the manor changed hands several times. The Civil War of 1642–46 came and went without leaving any physical scars and there is no record of any significant happenings in Baddesley during this time. However, the then lord of the manor, Samuel Dunch was a strong parliamentarian. He was later related to the Cromwell family through the marriage of his son John in 1650 to Ann Major of Hursley Park, whose sister Dorothy was married to Richard Cromwell.

In 1767 the manor was bought by Thomas Dummer of Cranbury Park, Otterbourne, from whom it devolved to the Chamberlayne family. The Joyce family bought the manor house from the Chamberlayne's in 1981 and have lived there ever since.

Baddesley gradually expanded down Nutburn Road and in 1876 the first buildings south of the crossroads were erected. The school opened to serve both Baddesley and Chilworth, with Mr Dibble the headmaster living in the adjoining schoolhouse.

The modern village (south of Botley Road), was built on open farmland and common-land belonging formerly to the Willis Fleming family of North Stoneham Park, who were major local landowners. This is reflected in the names of local roads, Willis Avenue and Fleming Avenue.

The arrival of the 20th century was to change Baddesley forever, propelling it from a small hamlet with a population of 393 in 1901 to that of the largest village in the Test Valley. In 2001, 100 years later, it had a population in excess of 10,000, akin to that of a small town, consisting predominantly of the 1960s / 70s style small housing. The most recent development is a new estate off Rownhams Road which was completed in 2008.

== Development ==
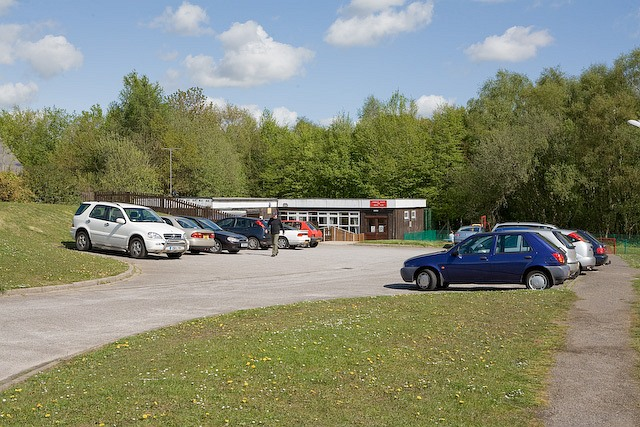
North Baddesley Community Centre

North Baddesley, although still a village, has many of the features, though few of the facilities, of a small town. In 1921 the population was fewer than 400, but by the outbreak of war in 1939 it was almost 1,000. Its proximity to Southampton and Eastleigh gave rise to considerable pressure for development after the war and large estates of modern houses were built. The most recent of the parish's developments is orientated to the north of Botley Road running up Nutburn Road.

There is a Community Centre on Fleming Avenue, and the church hall at All Saints church in the center of the village also provides space to many community initiatives.

Valley Park, which straddles the borough boundary with Eastleigh is now a community of 3000 dwellings, with a population of 7,500. Built from 1981 onwards, it was part of the parish of North Baddesley, but after much debate, it formed its own parish in 2006.

The old village lies to the north, and the manor house incorporates part of the Preceptory of the Knights Hospitaller, which was the Hampshire headquarters of the order after 1365. Reminders of this are found in the local place-names of Zionshill and Knightwood. The parish church is also of medieval foundation and is dedicated to St. John the Baptist, the patron saint of the Knights Hospitaller. However, the Knights seem to have had their own chapel in the Preceptory so it was probably not “a Knights Hospitallers Church” in a formal sense.

== Education ==
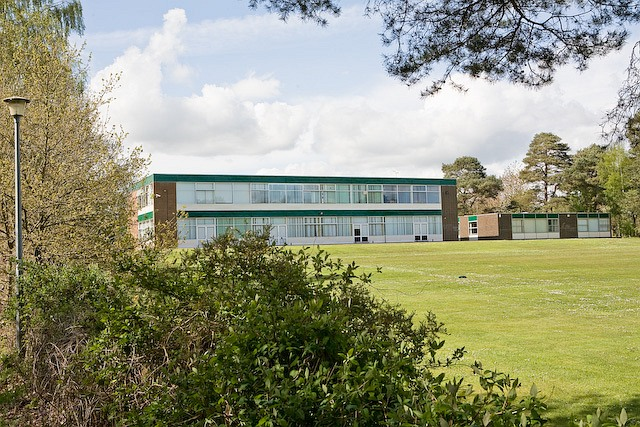
The junior school in 2008

North Baddesley Infant School was built in 1876 and has been an infant school since 1969. It has 270 pupils. North Baddesley Junior School underwent a £1.6million refurbishment in 2016–2017, and the two schools shared a £4.6 million expansion programme in 2017–2018, to become a three-form entry school.

== Baddesley Common ==
Baddesley Common and Emer Bog are areas of New Forest style grassland heath and bog. There is a wide variety of the plants which thrive in this environment and it is a Site of Special Scientific Interest (SSSI).

Marsh gentian, cross-leaved heath, lousewort, heath spotted orchid and petty whin are some specialist plants that occur in the wet heath areas.

White admiral and purple emperor butterflies glide through the woods and dragonflies chase over the bog and ponds. Several hundred different species of moth have been recorded.

There is also a boardwalk trail towards the back of the bog, which can be strolled to observe the woodland wildlife.

St John's Church is a mainly 17th-century building set on a hill-brow with a view over countryside. Baddesley Manor, opposite the church, is an 18th-century building as the successor of the medieval Preceptory of the Knights Hospitaller. The village was a stronghold of the Knights of St John.

== Notable people ==
North Baddesley was home to Keith Harris and Orville the Duck, as well as former Southampton FC player Matthew Le Tissier.

== Twin towns ==
North Baddesley is twinned with:

- Authie, France
- Carpiquet, France

== See also ==
- South Baddesley
