= Sheen Priory =

Carthusian monastery in London

Coordinates: 51.4681°N 0.3148°W

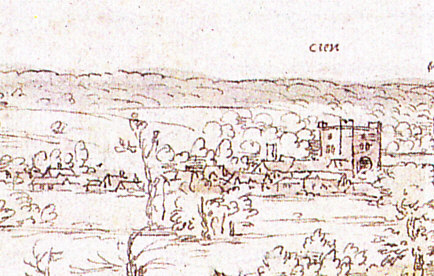
Sheen Priory from the west, c. 1558–62, detail from sketch of Richmond Palace (see below) by Wyngaerde. Note annotation above "cien". Ashmolean Museum, Oxford

Sheen Priory (ancient spelling: Shene, Shean, etc.) in Sheen, now Richmond, London, was a Carthusian monastery founded in 1414 within the royal manor of Sheen, on the south bank of the Thames, upstream and approximately nine miles (fourteen kilometres) southwest of the Palace of Westminster. It was built on a site approximately 1/2 mile (800 metres) north of Sheen Palace, which itself also occupied a riverside site, that today lies between Richmond Green and the River Thames.

All above-ground traces of the priory have disappeared, yet it is known that the foundations of the priory church lie to the immediate southwest of Kew Observatory, under the fairway of the 14th hole of the Royal Mid-Surrey Golf Course, in Richmond Old Deer Park. It is sometimes incorrectly referred to as Richmond Priory, due to the subsequent renaming of Sheen Manor in 1501.

== Background ==
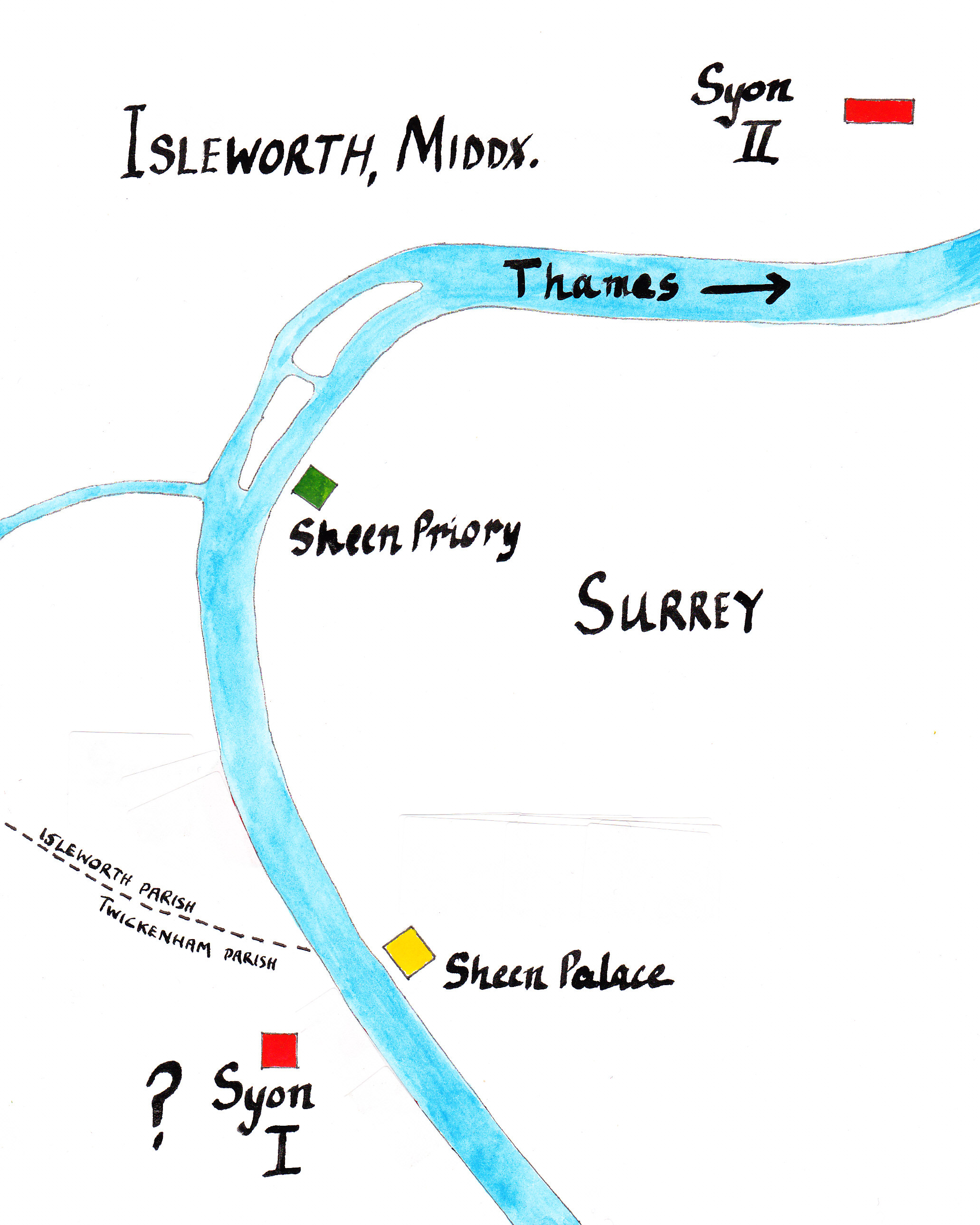
The King's Great Work of Henry V, centred around the rebuilt Sheen Palace, commenced winter 1413–14

Sheen Priory was built as part of King Henry V's "The King's Great Work" centred on Sheen Palace (renamed Richmond Palace in 1501). The royal manor of Sheen lay on the right (south), Surrey, bank of the River Thames, opposite the parish of Twickenham and the royal manor of Isleworth on the left (Middlesex) bank. Sheen had been a favourite residence of the last Plantagenet king Richard II (1377–1399) and his beloved wife Anne of Bohemia. When Anne died there of plague in 1394, Richard cursed the place where they had found great happiness and razed the palace to the ground. His throne was usurped by his cousin Henry Bolingbroke, Duke of Lancaster, who ruled as Henry IV (1399–1413). Henry IV had been involved in the murder of Richard II in 1400, and in the death of Richard le Scrope, Archbishop of York, and made a vow to expiate his guilt by founding three monasteries, but died before he could fulfil his vow. Henry IV had shown little interest in the ruined Sheen but his son Henry V (1413–1422) saw its reconstruction as a means of emphasising the dynastic link between his own House of Lancaster and that of Plantagenet, of unquestioned legitimacy, and decided at the same time to found the three monasteries pledged by his father all within one great building scheme, known as "The King's Great Work". This "Great Work" commenced in the winter of 1413–14, comprising the new Sheen Palace and the following monasteries nearby:

- A monastery of the Celestine Order, established probably in Isleworth Manor. This monastery was of French monks, who refused to pray for Henry V following his warring with France, probably at Agincourt in 1415, and was therefore dissolved by the King almost immediately after its foundation. It probably occupied the site in Isleworth to which Syon Monastery moved in 1431.
- The Monastery of St Saviour and St Bridget of Syon, of the Bridgettine Order (1415): Syon Monastery, sometimes called Syon Abbey. The first and original site of this monastery was probably almost due west of Sheen Palace, across the river, on the left bank of the Thames in Twickenham Parish.
- The House of Jesus of Bethlehem of Sheen, of the Order of Carthusians (1414): Sheen Priory, the subject of the present article, built within Sheen Manor, to the north of the new palace.

== Establishment of the priory ==
In 1414, Henry V established the priory, designated "The House of Jesus of Bethlehem of Shene", for 40 monks of the Carthusian order. It was built approximately 1/2 mile (800 metres) north of the existing royal manor house or palace, and had 30 cells round a great court or cloister.

The priory's endowments at its foundation included the church and rectory estate at Winterbourne Stoke, Wiltshire.

== Nomenclature ==
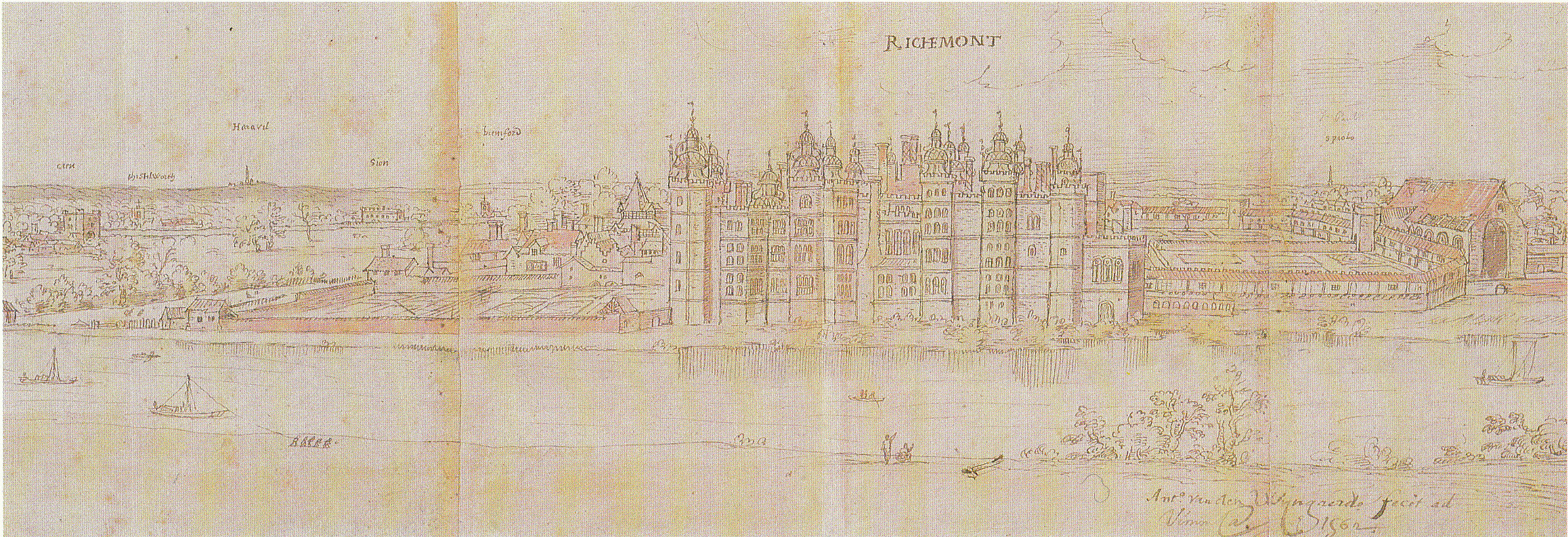
The new "Richmond" Palace of 1501, by Wyngaerde c. 1558–62. The view is from the west. The tower of the Sheen Priory Church can be seen at the far left (i.e. north), with the artist's annotation above "cien", not to be confused with "sion" which he has also depicted in its proper position. See detailed image above.

During the reign of King Henry VII (1485–1509), formerly styled "Earl of Richmond", the former royal manor house or palace of Sheen built by King Henry V was replaced in 1501 by a royal palace which was renamed "Richmond Palace" in honour of Henry VII. The name of the manor itself was likewise changed from "Sheen" to "Richmond". The name of Henry's earldom derived from his former stronghold, Richmond Castle in Yorkshire, itself named after Riche Mont (Rich Mountain) in France. The Priory of Sheen, although it then found itself within the newly renamed manor of Richmond, nevertheless retained its ancient appellation of "Sheen", being a religious establishment, the function of which was ostensibly the glorification of God not, as in the case of the new secular palace, of the new King and Tudor dynasty, victorious after the Battle of Bosworth in 1485. In 1500, at the command of Henry VII, the town of Sheen, which had grown up around the royal manor, was renamed Richmond, whereupon the entire ancient manor too, in which the new palace stood, became known as Richmond rather than Sheen. The ancient Manor of Sheen is now situated within today's London Borough of Richmond upon Thames.

The vestiges of Sheen Priory are thus situated in today's Borough of Richmond. That said, the ancient manor of Mortlake, which stood to the north and east of the ancient manor of Sheen, has in modern times been split into two new districts, North Sheen and East Sheen, although the area of neither was ever historically in Sheen Manor. Both are now in the London Borough of Richmond upon Thames.

== James IV of Scotland ==
Sheen Priory was the last resting place of the body of James IV of Scotland, who was killed at the Battle of Flodden in 1513. His body having been found on the battlefield by the victorious English, it was enclosed in a lead coffin and sent to London, and thence to Sheen Priory. It seems that the body was not physically buried at the Priory, on account of James IV having been excommunicated. In any event, before long both the body and the Priory were lost to history.

== Notable clerics trained at Sheen ==
The establishment is celebrated as having been the nursery of Cardinal Pole and many other distinguished churchmen in the early 16th century.

== Dissolution of the priory ==
Sheen Priory was dissolved in 1539 following the Dissolution of the Monasteries by King Henry VIII. Its buildings and assets became Crown property and were disposed of in accordance with the King's wishes.

== Sources ==
- Cloake, John (1990). Richmond's Great Monastery, The Charterhouse of Jesus of Bethlehem of Shene. London: Richmond Local History Society. ISBN 978-0950819860.
- Malden, H E (ed.) Victoria County History, Surrey, vol. 2 (1967) pp. 89–94. (Available at: www.British-history.ac.uk)
