= Dissolution of the monasteries =

1536–1541 disbanding of religious residences by Henry VIII

The dissolution of the monasteries, also known as the suppression of the monasteries, was a set of administrative and legal processes between 1536 and 1541, by which Henry VIII disbanded all Catholic monasteries, priories, convents, and friaries in England, Wales, and Ireland, seized their wealth, disposed of their assets, destroyed buildings and relics, dispersed or destroyed libraries and provided for their former personnel and functions.

Though the policy was originally envisaged as a way to increase the regular income of the Crown, much former monastic property was sold off to fund Henry's military campaigns in the 1540s. Henry did this under the Act of Supremacy, passed by Parliament in 1534, which made him Supreme Head of the Church in England. He had broken from Rome's papal authority the previous year. The monasteries were dissolved by two Acts of Parliament: the First Suppression Act in 1535 and the Second Suppression Act in 1539.

It has been described as "the greatest dislocation of people, property and daily life since the Norman Conquest" in Britain. Historian George W. Bernard argues that:

The dissolution of the monasteries in the late 1530s was one of the most revolutionary events in English history. There were nearly 900 religious houses in England, around 260 for monks, 300 for regular canons, 142 nunneries and 183 friaries; some 12,000 people in total, 4,000 monks, 3,000 canons, 3,000 friars and 2,000 nuns. If the adult male population was 500,000, that meant that one adult man in fifty was in religious orders.

== Background ==
At the time of their suppression, only some English and Welsh religious houses could trace their origins to Anglo-Saxon or Celtic foundations before the Norman Conquest of 1066. The overwhelming majority of the 625 monastic communities dissolved by Henry VIII had developed in the wave of monastic enthusiasm that swept western Christendom in the 11th and 12th centuries. Few had been founded later than the end of the 13th century; the youngest was the Bridgettine nunnery of Syon Abbey, founded in 1415.

Typically, 11th- and 12th-century founders endowed monastic houses with revenue from landed estates and tithes appropriated from parish churches under the founder's patronage. As a consequence, religious houses in the 16th century controlled appointment to about two-fifths of all parish benefices in England, disposed of about half of all ecclesiastical income, and owned around a quarter of the nation's landed wealth. An English medieval proverb said that if the abbot of Glastonbury married the abbess of Shaftesbury, their heir would have more land than the king of England.

200 more houses of friars in England and Wales constituted a second distinct wave of monastic zeal in the 13th century. Friaries, for the most part, were concentrated in urban areas. Unlike monasteries, friaries had no income-bearing endowments; the friars, as mendicants, were supported financially by donations from the faithful, while ideally being self-sufficient and raising extensive urban kitchen gardens.

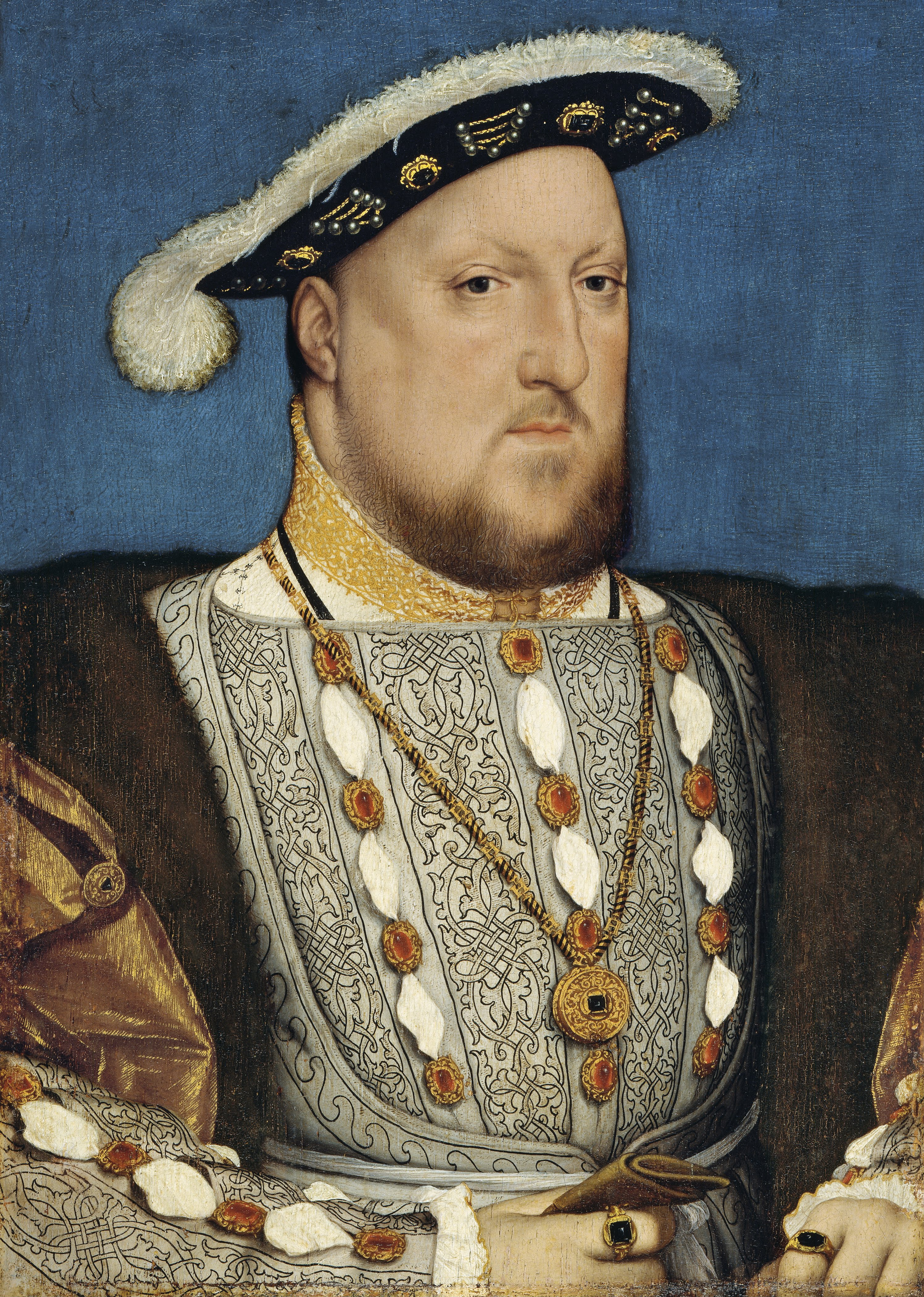
King Henry VIII c. 1537 by Hans Holbein the Younger. Thyssen-Bornemisza Museum, Madrid.

The Dissolution of the Monasteries took place in the political context of other attacks on the ecclesiastical institutions of Western Catholicism. Many of these were related to the Reformation in Continental Europe. By the end of the 16th century, monasticism had almost entirely disappeared from those European states whose rulers had adopted Lutheran or Reformed confessions of faith (Ireland being the only major exception). They continued in states that remained Catholic, and new community orders such as the Jesuits and Capuchins emerged alongside the older orders.

The religious and political changes in England under Henry VIII and Edward VI were of a different nature from those taking place in Germany, Bohemia, France, Scotland and Geneva. Across much of continental Europe, the seizure of monastic property was associated with mass discontent among the common people and the lower levels of clergy and civil society against powerful and wealthy ecclesiastical institutions. Such popular hostility against the church was rare in England before 1558; the Reformation in England and Ireland was directed from the king and high society. These changes were initially met with popular suspicion; on some occasions and in particular localities, there was active resistance to the royal programme.

=== Humanist criticisms of Late Medieval Western monasticism ===
Dissatisfaction with regular religious life, and with the gross extent of monastic wealth, was common amongst late medieval secular and ecclesiastical (church) leaders in the Latin West. G. W. Bernard says there was:

widespread concern in the later 15th and early 16th centuries about the condition of the monasteries. A leading figure here is the scholar and theologian Desiderius Erasmus who satirized monasteries as lax, as comfortably worldly, as wasteful of scarce resources, and as superstitious; he also thought it would be better if monks were brought more directly under the authority of bishops. At that time, quite a few bishops across Europe had come to believe that resources expensively deployed on an unceasing round of services by men and women in theory set apart from the world [would] be better spent on endowing grammar schools and university colleges to train men who would then serve the laity as parish priests, and on reforming the antiquated structures of over-large dioceses such as that of Lincoln. Pastoral care was seen as much more important and vital than the monastic focus on contemplation, prayer and performance of the daily office.

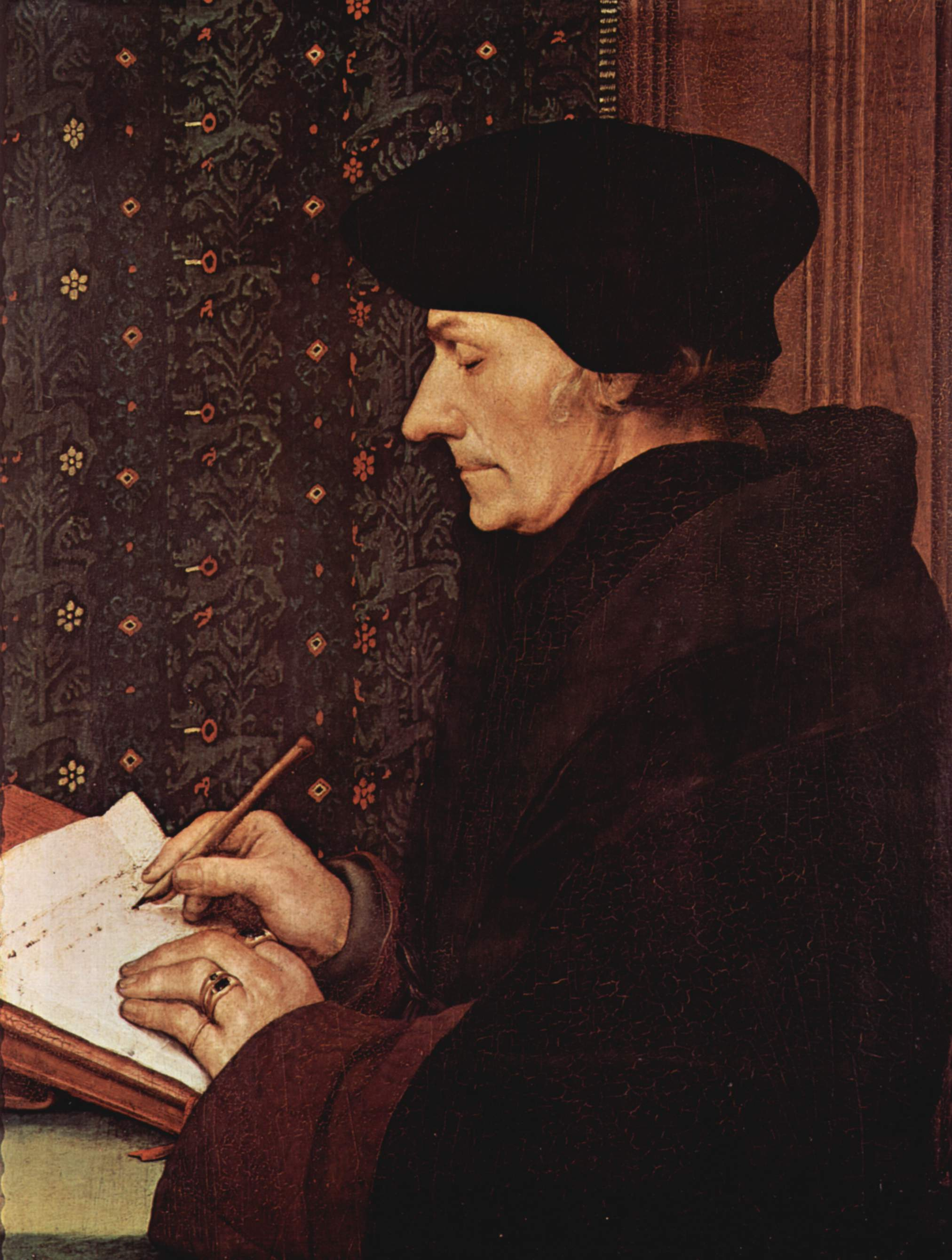
Desiderius Erasmus by Holbein; Renaissance humanist and influential critic of religious orders. Louvre, Paris.

Erasmus had made a threefold criticism of the monks and nuns of his day, saying that:

1. in withdrawing from the world into their own communal life, they elevated man-made monastic vows of poverty, chastity and obedience above the God-given vows of sacramental baptism; and elevated man-made monastic rules for religious life above the God-given teachings of the Gospels;
2. notwithstanding exceptional communities of genuine austere life and exemplary charity, many abbeys and priories were havens for idle drones, concerned only for their own existence, reserving for themselves an excessive share of the commonwealth's religious assets, and contributing little or nothing to the spiritual needs of ordinary people;
3. many monasteries were deeply involved in promoting and profiting from the veneration of relics, in the form of pilgrimages and purported miraculous tokens. The cult of relics was by no means specific to monasteries, but Erasmus was scandalised by the extent to which well-educated and highly regarded monks and nuns would participate in fraud (as he thought it) against gullible lay believers.

Summarising the state of monastic life across Western Europe, Catholic historian David Knowles said,

The verdict of unprejudiced historians at the present day would probably be—abstracting from all ideological considerations for or against monasticism—that there were far too many religious houses in existence in view of the widespread decline of the fervent monastic vocation, and that in every country the monks possessed too much of the wealth and of the sources of production both for their own well-being and for the material good of the economy.

=== Reforms ===
Pilgrimages to monastic shrines continued until forcibly suppressed in England in 1538 by order of Henry VIII, but the dissolution resulted in few modifications to England's parish churches. The English religious reforms of the 1530s corresponded little with the movement by Protestant Reformers, and encountered much popular hostility when they did. In 1536, Convocation adopted and Parliament enacted the Ten Articles, containing some terminology and ideas drawn from Luther and Melanchthon; but any momentum towards Protestantism stalled when Henry VIII expressed his support for the Six Articles of 1539, which remained in effect until after his death.

Cardinal Wolsey had obtained a papal bull authorising some limited reforms in the English Church as early as 1518, but reformers (both conservative and radical) had become increasingly frustrated at their lack of progress. In November 1529, Parliament passed Acts reforming what it considered to be abuses in the English Church. They set a cap on fees, both for the probate of wills and mortuary expenses for burial in hallowed ground; tightened regulations covering rights of sanctuary for criminals; and reduced to two the number of church benefices that could in the future be held by one man. These Acts were meant to demonstrate that royal jurisdiction over the Church would ensure progress in "religious reformation" where papal authority had been insufficient.

The monasteries were next in line. J. J. Scarisbrick remarked in his biography of Henry VIII:

Suffice it to say that English monasticism was a huge and urgent problem; that radical action, though of precisely what kind was another matter, was both necessary and inevitable, and that a purge of the religious orders was probably regarded as the most obvious task of the new regime—as the first function of a Supreme Head empowered by statute "to visit, extirp and redress".

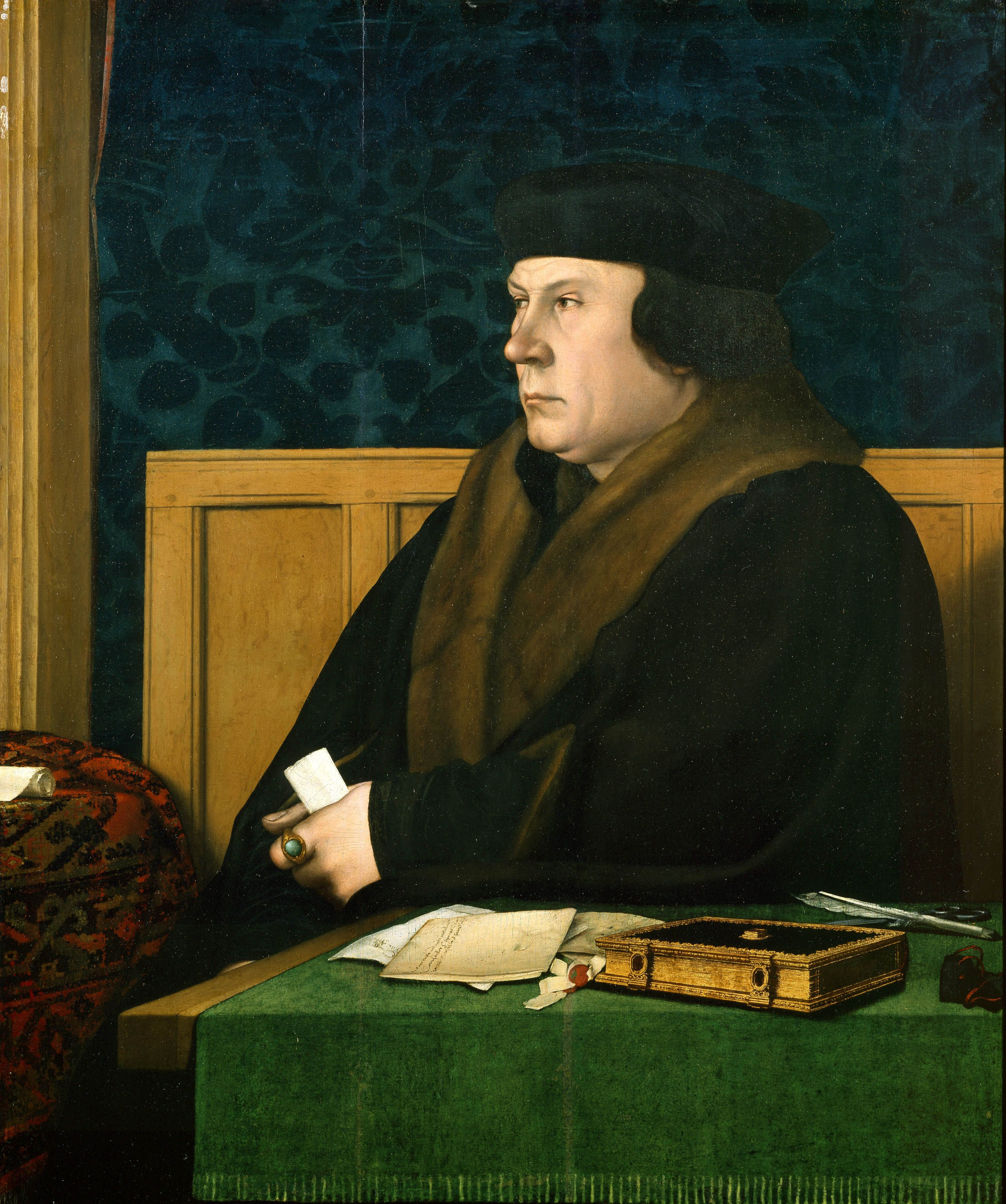
Thomas Cromwell by Hans Holbein: Chief Minister for Henry VIII and Vicegerent in Spirituals; created the administrative machinery for the Dissolution. Frick Collection, New York City

The stories of monastic impropriety, vice, and excess that were to be collected by Thomas Cromwell's visitors to the monasteries, including Richard Layton and Thomas Legh, may have been exaggerated but the religious houses of England and Wales—with the notable exceptions of those of the Carthusians, the Observant Franciscans, and the Bridgettine nuns and monks—had long ceased to play a leading role in the spiritual life of the country. Other than in these three orders, observance of strict monastic rules was partial at best. The exceptional spiritual discipline of the Carthusian, Observant Franciscan and Bridgettine orders had, over the previous century, resulted in their being singled out for royal favour, in particular with houses benefiting from endowments confiscated by the Crown from the suppressed alien priories.

Donations and legacies had tended to go instead towards parish churches, university colleges, grammar schools and collegiate churches, which suggests greater public approbation. Levels of monastic debt were increasing, and average numbers of professed religious were falling, although the monasteries continued to attract recruits right up to the end. Only a few monks and nuns lived in conspicuous luxury, but most were comfortably fed and housed by the standards of the time, and few orders demanded ascetic piety or religious observance. Only a minority of houses could now support the twelve or thirteen professed religious usually regarded as the minimum necessary to maintain the full canonical hours of the Divine Office. Even in houses with adequate numbers, the regular obligations of communal eating and shared living had not been fully enforced for centuries, as communities tended to sub-divide into a number of distinct familiae. In most larger houses, the full observance of the Canonical Hours had become the task of a sub-group of 'Cloister Monks', such that the majority of inhabitants were freed to conduct their business and live much of their lives in the secular world. Extensive monastic complexes dominated English towns of any size, but most were less than half full.

From 1534 onwards, Cromwell and King Henry wanted to redirect ecclesiastical income to the Crown – they justified this by contending that they were reclaiming what was theirs. Renaissance princes throughout Europe were facing severe financial difficulties due to sharply rising expenditures, especially to pay for armies, ships and fortifications. Many had already resorted to plundering monastic wealth. Protestant princes would justify this by claiming divine authority; Catholic princes would obtain the agreement of the papacy. Monastic wealth, regarded everywhere as excessive, offered a standing temptation for cash-strapped authorities.

Almost all official action in the English dissolution was directed at the monasteries. The closing of the monasteries aroused popular opposition, but resistors became the targets of royal hostility. The surrender of the friaries, from an official perspective, arose almost as an afterthought, once it had been determined that all religious houses would have to go. In terms of popular esteem, the balance tilted the other way. Almost all monasteries supported themselves from their endowments; in late medieval terms 'they lived off their own'. Unless they were notably bad landlords, they tended to enjoy widespread local support; they also commonly appointed local notables to fee-bearing offices. The friars were by contrast much more likely to have been the objects of local hostility, especially since their practice of soliciting income through legacies appears to have been perceived as diminishing family inheritances.

== Precedents for confiscations ==
By the time Henry VIII turned to monastery reform, royal action to suppress religious houses had a history of more than 200 years; his innovation was in scale. The first case was that of the so-called "alien priories". As a result of the Norman Conquest of 1066, some French religious orders held substantial property through their daughter monasteries in England.

Some of these were granges, agricultural estates with a single foreign monk in residence to supervise; others were rich foundations in their own right (e.g., Lewes Priory was a daughter of Cluny and answered to the abbot of the French house).

The royal transfer of alien monastic estates to educational foundations inspired bishops and, as the 15th century waned, this practice was common. The subjects of these dissolutions were usually small, poor, and indebted Benedictine or Augustinian communities (especially those of women) with few powerful friends; the great abbeys and orders exempt from diocesan supervision such as the Cistercians were unaffected.

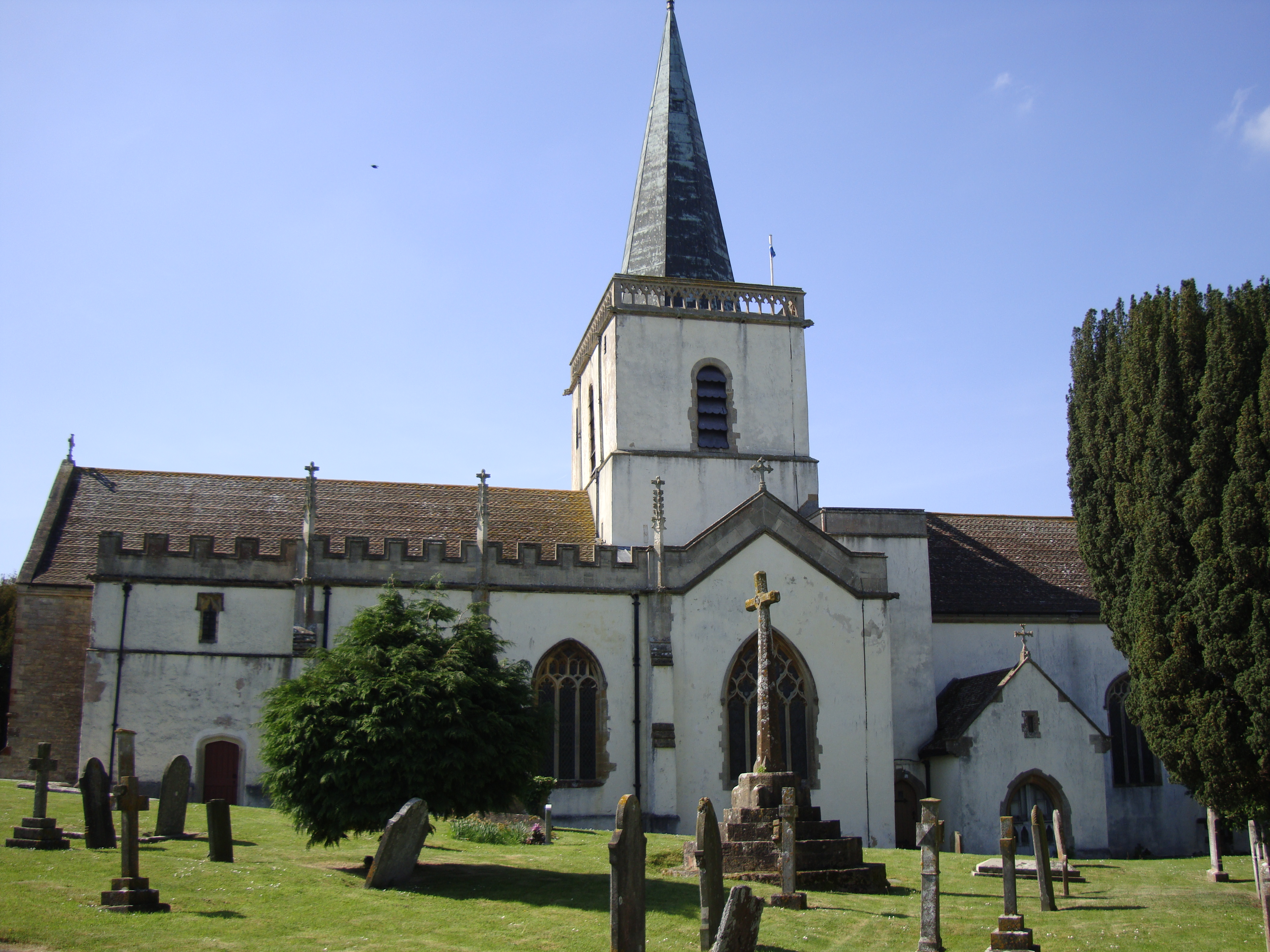
Stogursey Priory in Somerset. An alien priory dissolved in 1414 and granted to Eton College

The resources were transferred often to Oxford University and Cambridge University colleges: instances of this include John Alcock, Bishop of Ely dissolving the Benedictine St Radegund's Priory, Cambridge to found Jesus College, Cambridge (1496), and William Waynflete, Bishop of Winchester acquiring Selborne Priory in Hampshire in 1484 for Magdalen College, Oxford.

Dissolutions often faced strong resistance in practice. Members of religious houses proposed for dissolution might resist relocation; the houses invited to receive them might refuse to co-operate; and local notables might resist the disruption in their networks of influence. Reforming bishops found they faced opposition when urging the heads of religious houses to enforce their monastic rules, especially those requiring monks and nuns to remain within their cloisters. Religious superiors met their bishops' pressure with the response that the cloistered ideal was only acceptable to a tiny minority of regular clergy, and that any attempt to enforce their order's stricter rules could be overturned in counter-actions in the secular courts, if aggrieved monks and nuns obtained a writ of praemunire.

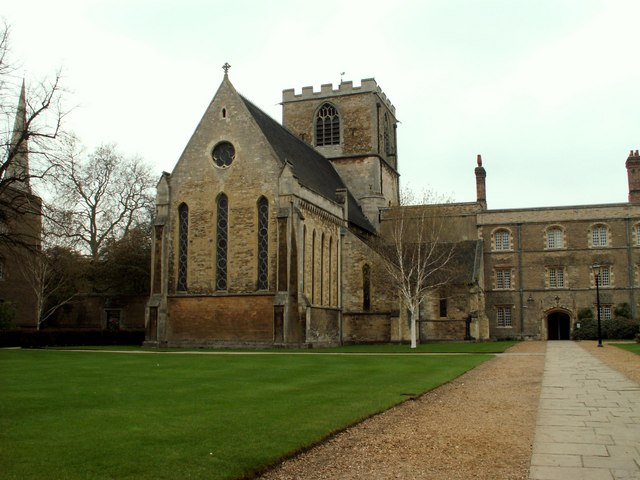
St Radegund's Priory, Cambridge; dissolved in 1496 and converted into Jesus College, Cambridge

In the following century, Lady Margaret Beaufort obtained the property of Creake Abbey in Norfolk (whose religious had all died of sweating sickness in 1506), to fund her works at Oxford and Cambridge. She was advised in this action by the staunch traditionalist John Fisher, Bishop of Rochester.

In 1522, Fisher himself dissolved the women's monasteries of Bromhall and Higham to aid St John's College, Cambridge. That same year, Cardinal Wolsey dissolved St Frideswide's Priory (now Oxford Cathedral) to form the basis of his Christ Church, Oxford; in 1524, he secured a papal bull to dissolve 20 other monasteries to provide an endowment for his new college. The remaining friars, monks and nuns were absorbed into other houses of their respective orders. Juries found the property of the houses to have reverted to the Crown as founder. In 1525, Wolsey dissolved Bayham Abbey to fund his colleges in Oxford and Ipswich. The local villagers rioted and restored the canons to the Abbey for a week before they were forcibly removed.

The King actively supported Wolsey, Fisher and Richard Foxe in their programmes of monastic reform; but even so, progress was painfully slow, especially where religious orders had been exempted from episcopal oversight by papal authority. It was also never certain that juries would find in favour of the Crown in disposing of the property of dissolved houses; any action that impinged on monasteries with substantial assets might be expected to be contested by a range of influential claimants. In 1532, the priory of Christchurch Aldgate, facing financial and legal difficulties, petitioned the King as founder for assistance, only to find themselves dissolved arbitrarily. Rather than risk empanelling a jury, and with papal participation no longer being welcome, the Lord Chancellor, Thomas Audley, recommended that dissolution should be legalised retrospectively through a special act of Parliament.

== Continental precedents ==
In 1521, Martin Luther had published De votis monasticis (On the monastic vows), a treatise which declared that the monastic life had no scriptural basis, was pointless and also actively immoral, incompatible with the true spirit of Christianity. Luther also declared that monastic vows were meaningless and that no one should feel bound by them. Luther, a one-time Augustinian friar, found some comfort when these views had a dramatic effect: a special meeting of the German province of his order held the same year voted that henceforth every member of the regular clergy should be free to renounce their vows, resign their offices, and marry. At Luther's home monastery in Wittenberg all the friars, save one, did so.

News spread among Protestant-minded rulers across Europe, and some, particularly in Scandinavia, moved very quickly. In the Riksdag of Västerås in 1527, initiating the Reformation in Sweden, King Gustav Vasa secured an edict of the Diet allowing him to confiscate any monastic lands he deemed necessary to increase royal revenues, and to allow the return of donated properties to the descendants of the donors. By the following Reduction of Gustav I of Sweden, Gustav gained large estates, as well as loyal supporters among the nobility who reclaimed donations given by their families to the convents. The Swedish monasteries and convents were simultaneously deprived of their livelihoods. They were banned from accepting new novices, and forbidden to prevent their existing members from leaving. However, the former monks and nuns were allowed to reside in the convent buildings for life on state allowance, and many communities survived the Reformation for decades. The last of them was Vreta Abbey, where the last nuns died in 1582, and Vadstena Abbey, from which the last nuns emigrated in 1595, about half a century after the Reduction.

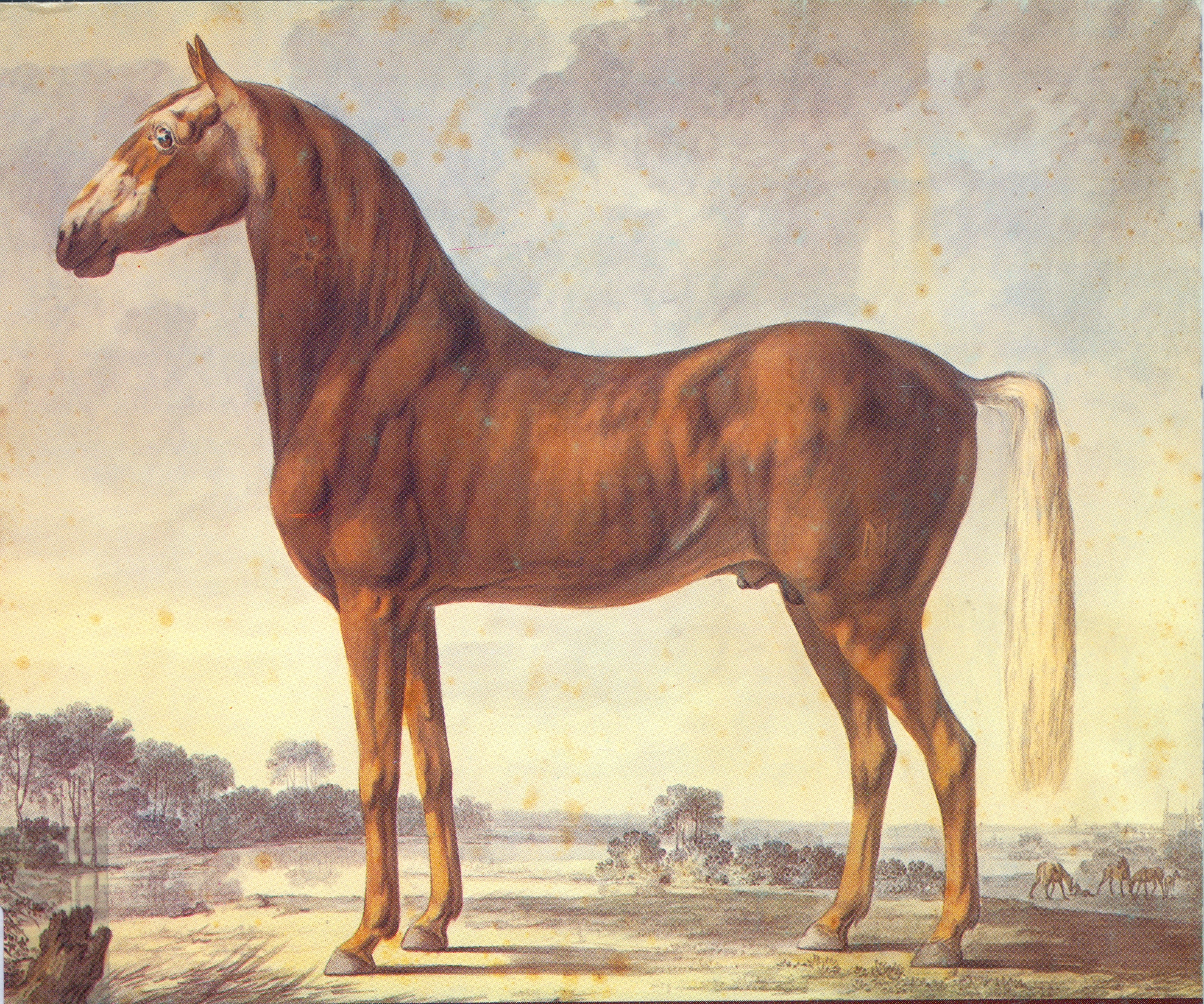
The stallion "Bæveren III" of the Frederiksborg royal stud, c. 1805.

In Denmark–Norway, King Frederick I made a similar act in 1528, confiscating 15 of the houses of the wealthiest monasteries and convents. Further laws by his successor in the 1530s, Christian III of Denmark, banned the friars, and forced monks and nuns to transfer title to their houses to the Crown, which passed them out to supportive nobles who soon acquired former monastic lands. In 1536, Christian III took control of the horse stud at Esrum Abbey, and moved its horses to Hillerød (Frederiksborg), north of Copenhagen, the capital of Denmark. These horses would later become known as the Frederiksborger horse breed under King Frederik II, who founded the Royal Federiksborg Stud in 1562.

In Switzerland, too, monasteries were under threat. In 1523, the government of the city-state of Zürich pressured nuns to leave their monasteries and marry and followed up the next year by dissolving all monasteries in its territory, under the pretext of using their revenues to fund education and help the poor. The city of Basel followed suit in 1529, and Geneva adopted the same policy in 1530. An attempt was also made in 1530 to dissolve the famous Abbey of St Gall, which was a state of the Holy Roman Empire in its own right, but this failed, and St Gall survived until 1798.

In France and Scotland, by contrast, royal action to seize monastic income proceeded along entirely different lines. In both countries, the practice of nominating abbacies in commendam had become widespread. Since the 12th century, it had become universal in Western Europe for the household expenses of abbots and conventual priors to be separated, typically appropriating more than half the house's income. With papal approval, these funds might be diverted on a vacancy to support a non-monastic ecclesiastic, commonly a bishop or member of the Papal Curia; and although such arrangements were nominally temporary, commendatory abbacies often continued long-term. Then, by the Concordat of Bologna in 1516, Pope Leo X granted to Francis I authority to nominate almost all abbots and conventual priors in France. Around 80 per cent of French abbacies came to be held in commendam, the commendators often being lay courtiers or royal servants; around half the income of French monasteries was diverted into the hands of the Crown, or of royal supporters, all with the Popes' blessing. Where the French kings led, the Scots kings followed. In Scotland, where the proportion of parish tiends appropriated by higher ecclesiastical institutions exceeded 85 per cent, in 1532 the young James V obtained from the Pope approval to appoint his illegitimate infant sons (of which he eventually acquired nine) as commendators to abbacies in Scotland. Other Scots aristocratic families stuck similar deals, and consequently over £40,000 (Scots) per annum was diverted from monasteries into the royal coffers.

It is inconceivable that these moves went unnoticed by the English government and particularly by Thomas Cromwell, who had been employed by Wolsey in his monastic suppressions, and who would become Henry VIII's King's Secretary. Henry appears to have been much more influenced by the opinions on monasticism of the humanists Desiderius Erasmus and Thomas More, especially as found in Erasmus's work In Praise of Folly (1511) and More's Utopia (1516). Erasmus and More promoted ecclesiastical reform while remaining faithful to the Church of Rome and had ridiculed such monastic practices as repetitive formal religion, superstitious pilgrimages for the veneration of relics, and the accumulation of monastic wealth. Henry appears to have shared these views, never having endowed a religious house and only once having undertaken a religious pilgrimage, to Walsingham in 1511. From 1518, Thomas More was increasingly influential as a royal servant and counsellor, in the course of which his correspondence included strong condemnations of the idleness and vice in monastic life, alongside his equally vituperative attacks on Luther. Henry himself corresponded continually with Erasmus, prompting him to be more explicit in his public rejection of the key tenets of Lutheranism and offering him church preferment should he wish to return to England.

== Process ==
=== Declaration as Head of the Church ===
On famously failing to receive from the Pope a declaration of nullity regarding his marriage, Henry had himself declared Supreme Head of the Church of England in February 1531, and instigated a programme of legislation to establish this Royal Supremacy in law. In April 1533, an Act in Restraint of Appeals eliminated the right of clergy to appeal to "foreign tribunals" (Rome) over the King's head in any matter. All ecclesiastical charges and levies that had previously been payable to Rome would now go to the King. By the Submission of the Clergy, the English clergy and religious orders subscribed to the proposition that the King was, and had always been, the Supreme Head of the Church in England. Consequently, in Henry's view, any act of monastic resistance to royal authority would be more than just treasonable; it would also be a breach of the monastic vow of obedience.

Under heavy threats, almost all religious houses joined the rest of the Church in acceding to the Royal Supremacy; and in swearing to uphold the validity of the King's divorce and remarriage. Opposition was concentrated in the houses of Carthusian monks, Observant Franciscan friars and Bridgettine monks and nuns. Great efforts were made to cajole, bribe, trick and threaten these houses into formal compliance, with those religious who continued in their resistance being liable to imprisonment until they submitted or if they persisted, to execution for treason. All the houses of the Observant Friars were handed over to the mainstream Franciscan order; the friars from the Greenwich house were imprisoned, where many died from ill-treatment. The Carthusians eventually submitted, other than the monks of the London house which was suppressed; some of the monks were executed for high treason in 1535, and others starved to death in prison. Also opposing the Supremacy and consequently imprisoned were Bridgettine monks from Syon Abbey. The Syon nuns, being strictly enclosed, escaped sanction at this stage, the personal compliance of the abbess being taken as sufficient for the government's purposes.

Historians, often Anglican, have downplayed the difficulties above, and the various bloody rebellions, and attributed compliance to native xenophobia or reserve rather than to real threats. For example, 20th-century author G. W. O. Woodward wrote

All but a very few took it without demur. They were, after all, Englishmen, and shared the common prejudice of their contemporaries against the pretensions of foreign Italian prelates.

=== Visitation of the monasteries ===
In 1534, Cromwell undertook, on behalf of the King, an inventory of the endowments, liabilities and income of the entire ecclesiastical estate of England and Wales, including the monasteries (see Valor Ecclesiasticus), for the purpose of assessing the Church's taxable value, through local commissioners who reported in May 1535. At the same time, Henry had Parliament authorise Cromwell to "visit" all the monasteries, including those like the Cistercians previously exempted from episcopal oversight by papal dispensation, to instruct them in their duty to obey the King and reject papal authority. Cromwell delegated his visitation authority to hand-picked commissioners, chiefly Richard Layton, Thomas Legh, John ap Rice and John Tregonwell, for the purposes of ascertaining the quality of religious life being maintained in religious houses, of assessing the prevalence of "superstitious" religious observances such as the veneration of relics, and for inquiring into evidence of moral laxity (especially sexual). The chosen commissioners were mostly secular clergy, and appear to have been Erasmian, doubtful of the value of monastic life and universally dismissive of relics and miraculous tokens. By comparison with the valuation commissions, the timetable for these monastic visitations was tight, with some houses missed altogether, and inquiries appear to have concentrated on gross faults and laxity; consequently, where the reports of misbehaviour can be checked against other sources, they commonly appear to have been both rushed and greatly exaggerated, often recalling events from years before. The visitors interviewed each member of the house and selected servants, prompting individual confessions of wrongdoing and asking them to inform on one another. From their correspondence with Cromwell it can be seen that the visitors knew that findings of impropriety were both expected and desired; however, where no faults were revealed, none were reported. The visitors put the worst construction they could on whatever they were told, but they do not appear to have fabricated allegations of wrongdoing outright.

=== Reports and further visitations ===
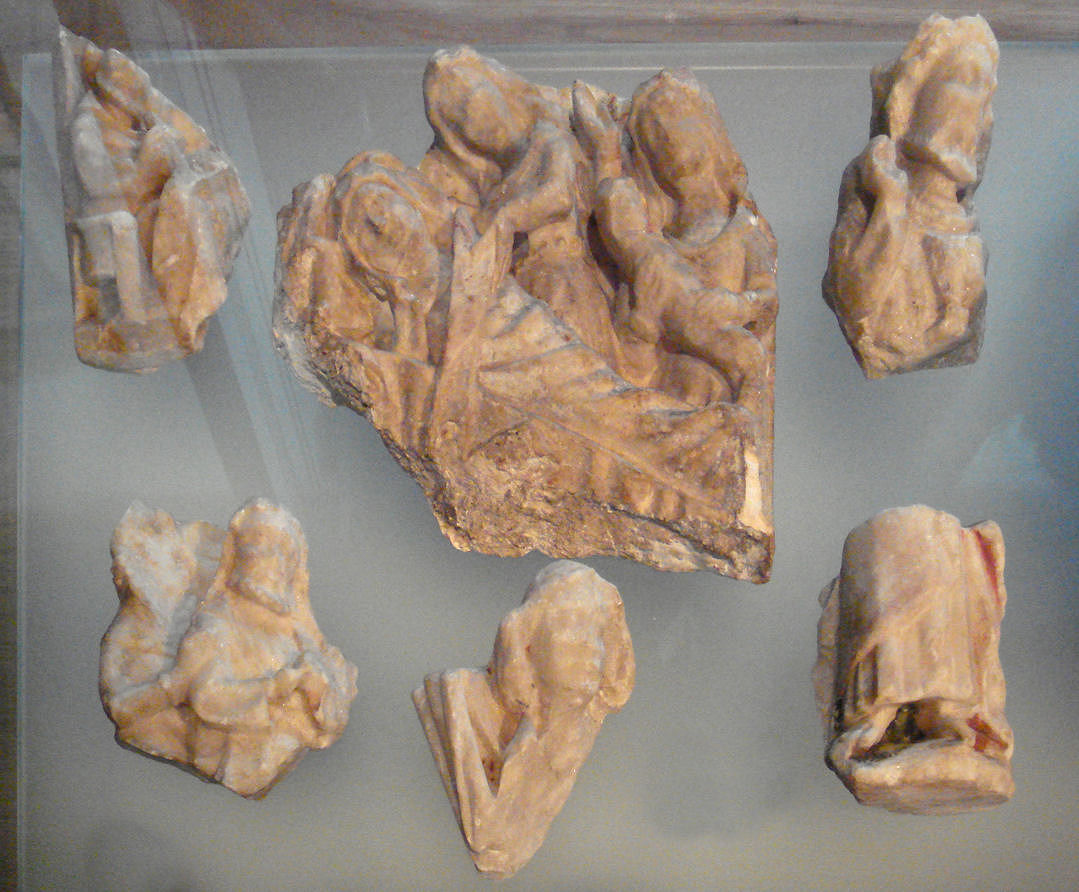
Altarpiece fragments (late 1300 – early 1400) destroyed during the dissolution, mid-16th century

In the autumn of 1535, the visiting commissioners were sending back to Cromwell their written reports, enclosing with them bundles of purported miraculous wimples, girdles and mantles that monks and nuns had been lending out for cash to the sick, or to mothers in labour. The commissioners appear to have instructed houses to reintroduce the strict practice of common dining and cloistered living, urging that those unable to comply should be encouraged to leave; and many appear to have been released from their monastic vows. The visitors reported the number of professed religious persons continuing in each house. In the case of seven houses, impropriety or irreligion had been so great, or the numbers remaining so few, that the commissioners had felt compelled to suppress it on the spot; in others, the abbot, prior or noble patron was reported to be petitioning the King for a house to be dissolved. Such authority had formerly rested with the Pope, but now the King would need to establish a legal basis for dissolution in statutory law. Moreover, it was by no means clear that the property of a surrendered house would automatically be at the disposal of the Crown; a good case could be made for this property to revert to the heirs and descendants of the founder or other patron.

Parliament enacted the Suppression of Religious Houses Act 1535 ("Dissolution of the Lesser Monasteries Act") in early 1535, relying on the reports of "impropriety" Cromwell had received, establishing the power of the King to dissolve religious houses that were failing to maintain a religious life, consequently providing for the King to compulsorily dissolve monasteries with annual incomes declared in the Valor Ecclesiasticus of less than £200 (of which there were potentially 419) but also giving the King the discretion to exempt any of these houses from dissolution at his pleasure. All property of the dissolved house would revert to the Crown. Many monasteries falling below the threshold forwarded a case for continuation, offering to pay substantial fines. Many such cases were accepted, so that only around 330 were referred to suppression commissions, and only 243 houses were actually dissolved at this time. The choice of a £200 threshold as the criterion for general dissolution under the legislation was suspect, as the preamble refers to numbers rather than income. Adopting a financial criterion was likely determined pragmatically; the Valor Ecclesiasticus data being both more reliable and more complete than those of Cromwell's visitors.

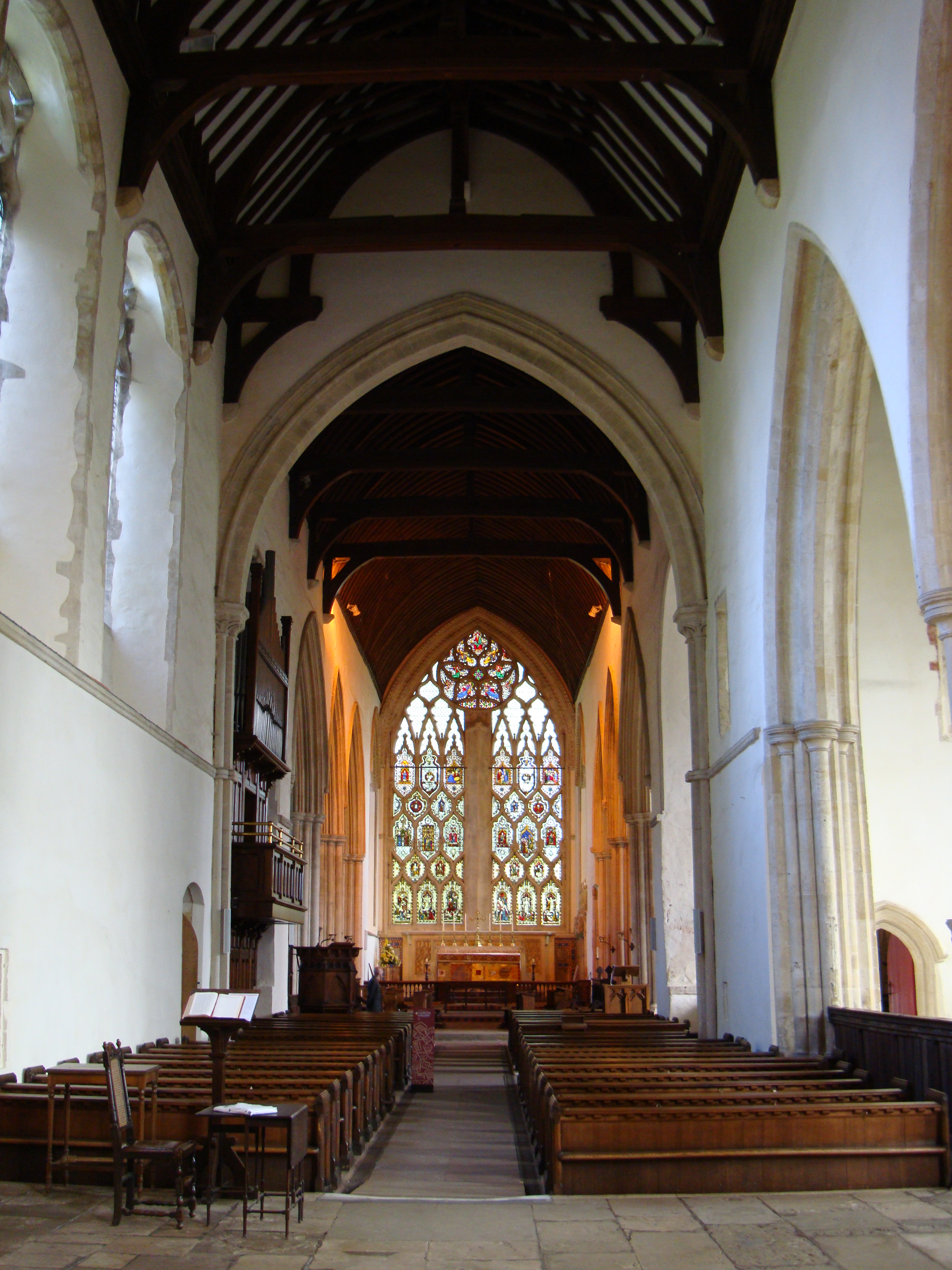
Dorchester Abbey in Oxfordshire; a smaller house with a net income below £200-year, dissolved in 1536 and purchased for a parish church

The smaller houses identified for suppression were visited during 1536 by more local commissions, one for each county, charged with creating an inventory of assets and valuables, and empowered to obtain co-operation from monastic superiors by granting pensions or bribes. In practice, few houses immediately surrendered. A two-stage procedure was applied, the commissions reporting back to Cromwell for a decision as to whether to proceed with dissolution. These commissioners often supported the continuation of a house where they found no serious problem; arguments that Cromwell appears to have accepted. Around 80 houses were exempted. Where dissolution was determined, a second visit would affect the arrangements for closure of the house, disposal of its assets and endowments and provisions for the future of its members. Otherwise, the second visit would collect a fine. In general, these commissioners were less inclined to report faults in monastic observance within the smaller houses than the earlier group had been, although this may have been coloured by an awareness that monks and nuns with a bad reputation would be difficult to place elsewhere. The 1536 Act established that, whatever the claims of founders or patrons, the property of the dissolved smaller houses reverted to the Crown. Cromwell established a new government agency, the Court of Augmentations, to manage that. Although the property rights of lay founders and patrons were legally extinguished, the incomes of lay holders of monastic offices, pensions and annuities were generally preserved, as were the rights of tenants of monastic lands.

Ordinary monks and nuns were given the choice of secularisation (with a cash gratuity but no pension), or of transfer to a continuing larger house of the same order. However, former monks and nuns were still banned from marriage, having taken a vow, making their life precarious. The majority of those then remaining chose to continue in the religious life. In some areas, the premises of a suppressed religious house were recycled into a new foundation to accommodate them, and rehousing those seeking a transfer proved much more difficult and time-consuming than appears to have been anticipated.

At least two houses, Norton Priory in Cheshire and Hexham Priory in Northumberland, attempted to resist the commissioners by force, actions which Henry interpreted as treason. He wrote personally to demand the brutal punishment of those responsible. The prior and canons of Norton were imprisoned for several months and were fortunate to escape with their lives; the canons of Hexham, who made the mistake of becoming involved in the Pilgrimage of Grace, were executed.

=== Initial round of suppressions ===
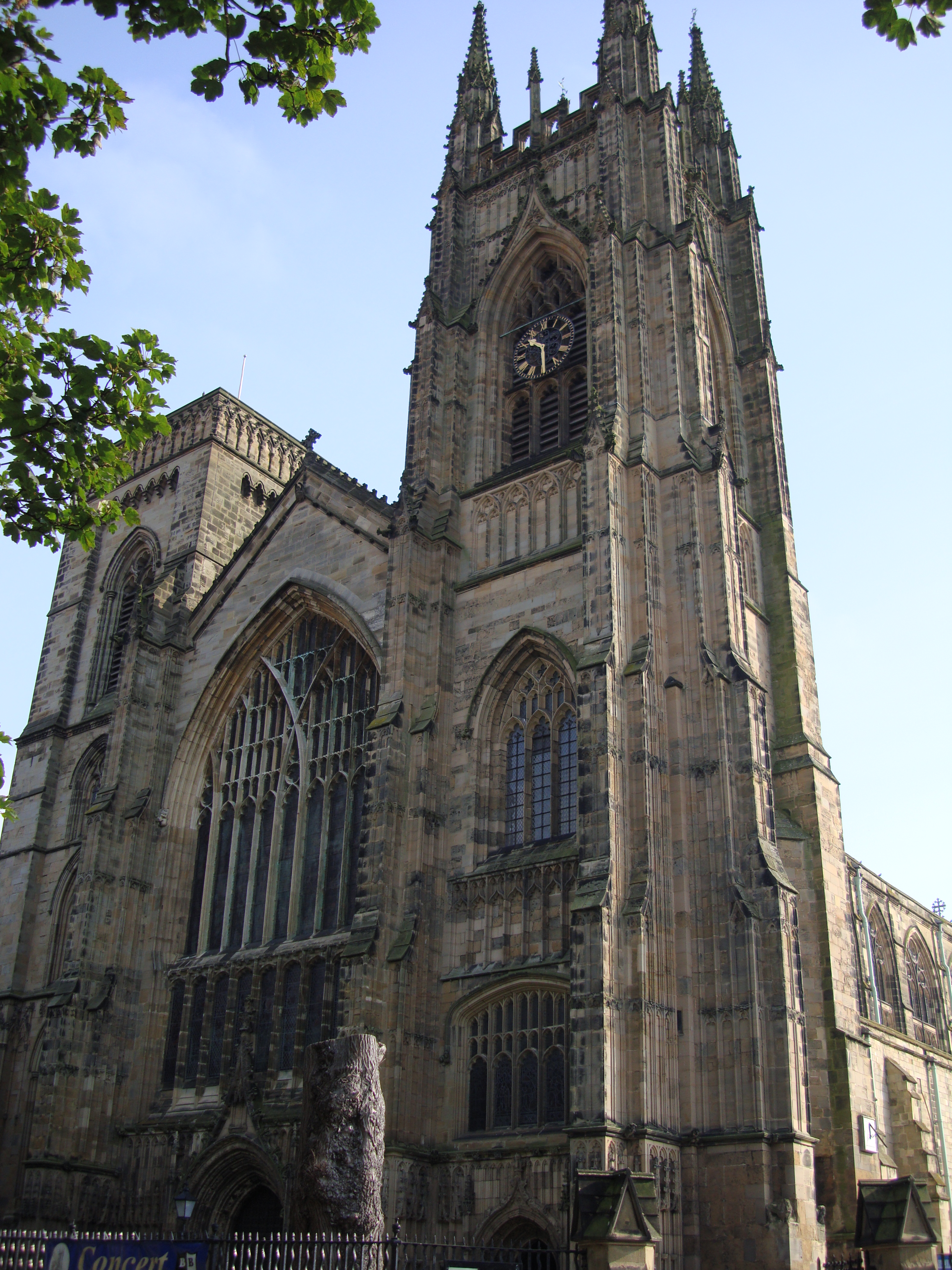
Bridlington Priory in Yorkshire; dissolved in 1537 due to the attainder of the prior for treason following the Pilgrimage of Grace

The first round of suppressions initially aroused popular discontent, especially in Lincolnshire and Yorkshire where many contributed to the Pilgrimage of Grace of 1536. This turn led to Henry increasingly associating monasticism with betrayal, as some of the spared religious houses in northern England (more or less willingly) sided with the rebels, while former monks resumed religious life in several of the suppressed houses. Clauses within the Treasons Act 1534 provided that the property of those convicted of treason would automatically revert to the Crown, clauses that Cromwell had drafted with the intention of effecting the dissolution of religious houses, arguing that the superior of the house (abbot, abbess, prior or prioress) was the legal "owner" of all its monastic property. The wording of the First Suppression Act had been clear that reform, not outright abolition of monastic life, was being presented as the objective of the government. There has been continuing academic debate as to whether a universal dissolution was being covertly prepared at this point.

The predominant academic opinion is that the extensive care taken to provide for monks and nuns from the suppressed houses to transfer demonstrates that monastic reform was still, at least in the mind of the King, the guiding principle. Further large-scale action against substandard richer monasteries was always planned. The selection of poorer houses for dissolution in the First Act minimised the potential release of funds to other purposes. Once pensions had been committed to former superiors, cash rewards paid to those wishing to leave the religious life, and funding allocated for refounded houses, it is unlikely that the crown profited beyond the fines levied on exempted houses. During 1537 (possibly conditioned by concern not to re-ignite rebellious impulses) no further dissolutions were undertaken. Episcopal visitations were renewed, monasteries adapted their internal discipline in accordance with Cromwell's injunctions, and many houses undertook overdue programmes of repair and reconstruction.

The remaining monasteries required funds, partly to pay fines for exemption. During 1537 and 1538, there was a large increase in monastic lands and endowments being leased out, and in the offer of fee-paying offices and annuities in return for cash. By establishing long-term liabilities, these actions diminished the eventual net return to the Crown from each house's endowments, but they were not officially discouraged. Cromwell obtained and solicited many such fees in his own personal favour. Crucially, having created the precedent that tenants and lay recipients of monastic incomes might expect to have their interests recognised by the Court of Augmentations following dissolution, the government's apparent acquiescence to the granting of additional such rights helped establish a predisposition towards dissolution amongst tenants. At the same time, and especially once the loss of income from shrines and pilgrimages was taken into account, the long-term financial sustainability of many remaining houses was fragile.

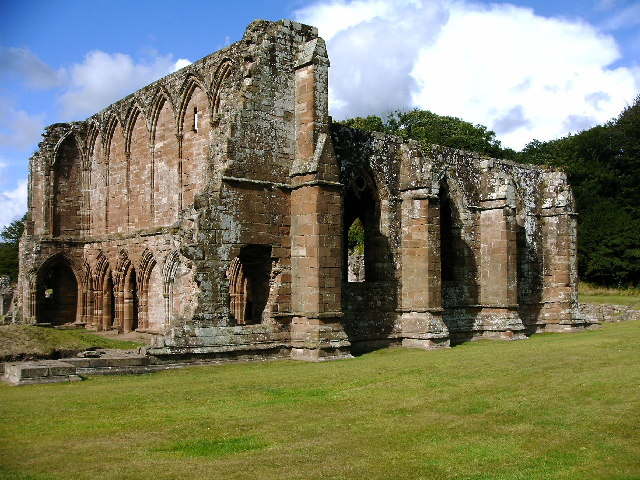
Furness Abbey in Cumbria; dissolved in 1537 and the first of the larger houses to be dissolved by voluntary surrender

Although Henry continued to maintain that his sole objective was monastic reform, in 1537 it became clear that official policy was the general extinction of monasticism in England and Wales. This extinction was now expected to be achieved through individual applications from superiors for voluntary surrender rather than through a systematic statutory dissolution. One Abbey whose monks had been implicated in the Pilgrimage of Grace was Furness in Lancashire. The abbot, fearful of a treason charge, petitioned to make a voluntary surrender of his house, which Cromwell happily approved. From then on, all dissolutions that were not a consequence of convictions for treason were legally "voluntary" – a principle that was taken a stage further with the voluntary surrender of Lewes priory in November 1537 when the monks were not accorded the option of transfer to another house, but with the additional motivation that from then on, ordinary monks (but not friars) were offered life pensions if they co-operated. Abbots and priors came under pressure from their communities to petition for voluntary surrender if they could obtain favourable terms for pensions; they also knew that if they refused to surrender, they might suffer the penalty for treason and their house would be dissolved anyway. Where the King had been able to establish himself as founder, he exploited his position to place compliant monks and nuns as the head of the house while non-royal patrons and founders also tended to press superiors for an early surrender, hoping to get preferential treatment in the disposal of monastic properties. From the beginning of 1538, Cromwell targeted the houses that he knew to be wavering in their resolve, cajoling and bullying their superiors to apply for surrender. Nevertheless, the public stance of the government was that the better-run houses could still expect to survive, and Cromwell dispatched a circular in March 1538 condemning false rumours of a general policy of dissolution while also warning superiors against asset-stripping or concealment of valuables, which could be construed as treasonable action.

=== Second round of dissolutions ===
As 1538 proceeded, applications for surrender flooded in. Cromwell appointed a local commissioner in each case to ensure rapid compliance with the King's wishes, to supervise the orderly sale of monastic goods and buildings, to dispose of monastic endowments, and to ensure that the former monks and nuns were provided with pensions, cash gratuities and clothing. Existing tenants would have their tenancies continued, and lay office holders would continue to receive their incomes and fees (even without duties or obligations). Monks or nuns who were aged, handicapped or infirm were given more generous pensions, and care was taken throughout that there should be nobody cast out of their place unprovided for (who might otherwise have increased the burden of charity for local parishes). In a few instances, even monastic servants were provided with a year's wages on discharge.

The endowments of landed property and appropriated parish tithes and glebe were transferred to the Court of Augmentations, who would pay out life pensions and fees at the agreed rate. Pensions averaged around £5 per annum before tax for monks, with those for superiors typically assessed at 10% of the net annual income of the house and were not reduced if the pensioner obtained other employment. If the pensioner accepted a royal appointment or benefice of greater annual value than their pension, the pension would be extinguished. In 1538, £5 compared with the annual wages of a skilled worker—and although the real value of such a fixed income would suffer through inflation—it remained a significant sum.

To save money on pensions for former heads of monastic houses, at least twenty monks and canons were granted established or newly-created bishoprics within a decade of the dissolution.

Pensions granted to nuns were less generous, averaging £3 per annum. During Henry's reign, former nuns, like monks, continued to be forbidden to marry, therefore it is more possible that genuine hardship resulted, especially as former nuns had little access to opportunities for gainful employment. Where nuns came from well-born families, as many did, they seem commonly to have returned to live with their relatives. Otherwise, there were a number of instances where former nuns of a house clubbed together in a shared household. There were no retrospective pensions for those monks or nuns who had already sought secularisation following the 1535 visitation, nor for those members of the smaller houses dissolved in 1536 and 1537 who had not remained in the religious life, nor for those houses dissolved before 1538 due to the conviction for treason of their superior such as support for the Pilgrimage of Grace, and no friars were pensioned.

The future of the ten monastic cathedrals came into question. For two of these, Bath and Coventry, there was a second secular cathedral church in the same diocese, and both surrendered in 1539; but the other eight would necessarily need to continue in some form. It remained to determine what that form might be. A possible model was presented by the collegiate church of Stoke-by-Clare in Suffolk, where, in 1535 the evangelically minded Dean, Matthew Parker, had recast the college statutes away from the saying of chantry masses and towards preaching, observance of the office, and children's education.

In May 1538, the monastic cathedral community of Norwich surrendered, adopting new collegiate statutes as secular priests along similar lines. The new foundation in Norwich provided for around half the number of clergies as had been monks in the former monastery, with a dean, five prebendaries and sixteen minor canons. This change corresponded with ideas of a reformed future for monastic communities that had been a subject of debate and speculation amongst leading Benedictine abbots for decades, and sympathetic voices were being heard from a number of quarters in the late summer of 1538.

The Lord Chancellor, Thomas Audley, proposed Colchester and St Osyth's Priory as a possible future college. Thomas Howard, 3rd Duke of Norfolk and Lord Treasurer proposed Thetford Priory, making extensive preparations to adopt statutes similar to those from Stoke-by-Clare, and expending substantial sums into moving shrines, relics and architectural fittings from the dissolved Castle Acre Priory into Thetford priory church. Cromwell himself proposed Little Walsingham (once purged of its "superstitious" shrine), and Hugh Latimer, the evangelical bishop of Worcester, wrote to Cromwell in 1538 to plead for the continuation of Great Malvern Priory, and of "two or three in every shire of such remedy". By early 1539, the continuation of select great monasteries as collegiate refoundations had become an expectation. When the Second Suppression Act was presented to Parliament in May 1539, it was accompanied by an Act giving the King authority to establish new bishoprics and collegiate cathedral foundations. While the principle had been established, the numbers of successor colleges and cathedrals remained unspecified.

King Henry's enthusiasm for creating new bishoprics was second to his passion for building fortifications. When an apparent alliance of France and the Holy Roman Empire against England was agreed at Toledo in January 1539, this precipitated a major invasion scare. Even though by midsummer the immediate danger had passed, Henry still demanded from Cromwell unprecedented sums for the coastal defence works from St Michael's Mount to Lowestoft. The scale of the proposed new foundations was drastically cut back. In the end, six abbeys were raised to be cathedrals of new dioceses, and only two more major abbeys, Burton-on-Trent and Thornton, were re-founded as non-cathedral colleges. To the intense displeasure of Thomas Howard, Thetford was not spared, and was amongst the last houses to be dissolved in February 1540, while the Duke was out of the country on a hastily arranged embassy to France.

Even late in 1538, Cromwell himself appears to have hoped that a select group of nunneries might be spared, where they were able to demonstrate both a high quality of regular observance and a commitment to the principles of religious reform. One was Godstow Abbey near Oxford, whose abbess, Lady Katherine Bulkeley, was one whom Cromwell had personally promoted. Godstow was invaded by Dr John London, Cromwell's commissioner, in October 1538, demanding the surrender of the abbey; but following a direct appeal to Cromwell himself, the house was assured that it could continue. Lady Katherine assured Cromwell that "there is neither pope nor purgatory, image nor pilgrimage nor praying to dead saints used or regarded amongst us". Godstow Abbey was providing highly regarded boarding and schooling for girls of notable families. This was the case for several other nunneries, a factor which may have accounted for their surviving so long. Diarmaid MacCulloch further suggests that "customary male cowardice" was also a factor in the reluctance of the government to confront the heads of female religious houses. But the stay of execution for Godstow Abbey lasted just over a year: the abbey was suppressed in November 1539 along with all other nunnery survivors, as Henry was determined that none should continue.

=== Later dissolutions ===
None of the same legislation and visitation had applied to the houses of the friars. At the beginning of the 14th century there had been around 5,000 friars in England, occupying extensive complexes. There were still around 200 friaries in England at the dissolution. Except for the Observant Franciscans, by the 16th century the friars' income from donations had collapsed, their numbers had shrunk to less than 1,000 and their buildings were often ruinous or leased out commercially. No longer self-sufficient in food and with their cloistered spaces invaded by secular tenants, almost all friars were now living in rented lodgings outside their friaries and meeting for divine service in the friary church. Many friars now supported themselves through paid employment and held personal property.

By early 1538, suppression of the friaries was widely being anticipated. In some houses, all friars save the prior had already left, and assets (standing timber, chalices, vestments) were being sold off. Cromwell deputed Richard Yngworth, suffragan Bishop of Dover and former Provincial of the Dominicans, to obtain the friars' surrender, which he achieved rapidly by drafting new injunctions that enforced each order's rules and required friars to resume a strict conventual life within their walls. Failure to accept voluntary surrender would then result in enforced homelessness and starvation. Once the friars agreed to surrender, Yngworth reported to Cromwell. He noted on his actions for each friary, who was the current tenant of each of the gardens, what was the general state of the buildings, and whether any church had valuable lead on roofs and gutters. Most of the friaries were in disrepair, with leased-out gardens as the only valuable asset.

Yngworth had no authority to dispose of lands and property and could not negotiate pensions. Therefore, the friars appear to have been released and dismissed with a gratuity of around 40 shillings each. Yngworth took this payout from whatever cash resources were in hand. He listed by name the friars remaining in each house at surrender so that Cromwell could provide them with legal permission to pursue careers as a secular priests. Furthermore, Yngworth had no discretion to maintain friary churches, even though many had continued to attract congregations. They were disposed of rapidly by the Court of Augmentations. Of all the friary churches in England and Wales, only St Andrew's Hall, Norwich, Atherstone Priory (Warwickshire), the Chichester Guildhall, and Greyfriars Church, Reading remain standing (although the London church of the Austin Friars continued in use by the Dutch Church until destroyed in the London Blitz).

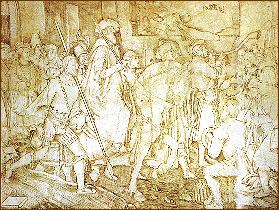
The suppression of St John's Abbey, Colchester, with the execution of the abbot shown in the background

In April 1539, Parliament passed a new law retrospectively legalising acts of voluntary surrender and assuring tenants of their continued rights, but by then the vast majority of monasteries in England and Wales had already been dissolved or marked out for a future as a collegiate foundation. Some still resisted, and that autumn the abbots of Colchester, Glastonbury, and Reading were hanged, drawn and quartered for treason, their houses being dissolved and their monks receiving a basic pension of £4 per year.

St Benet's Abbey in Norfolk was the only abbey in England which escaped formal dissolution. As the last abbot had been appointed to the see of Norwich, the abbey endowments were transferred alongside him directly into those of the bishops. The last three abbeys to be dissolved were Shap Abbey and Gloucester Abbey, both in January 1540, and Waltham Abbey, on 23 March 1540. Several priories also survived into 1540, including Bolton Priory in Yorkshire (dissolved 29 January 1540) and Thetford Priory in Norfolk (dissolved 16 February 1540). It was not until April 1540 that the cathedral priories of Canterbury and Rochester were transformed into secular cathedral chapters.

=== Effects on public life ===
The surrender of monastic endowments was recognised automatically as terminating all regular religious observance by its members, except in the case of a few communities, such as Syon, who went into exile. There are several recorded instances where groups of former members of a house set up residence together, but no cases where an entire community did so, and there is no indication that any continued to pray the Divine Office. The dissolution Acts were concerned solely with the disposal of endowed property, and never explicitly forbade the continuance of a regular life. Given Henry's attitude to those religious who resumed their houses during the Pilgrimage of Grace, it would have been seen as unwise for any former community to maintain covert monastic observance.

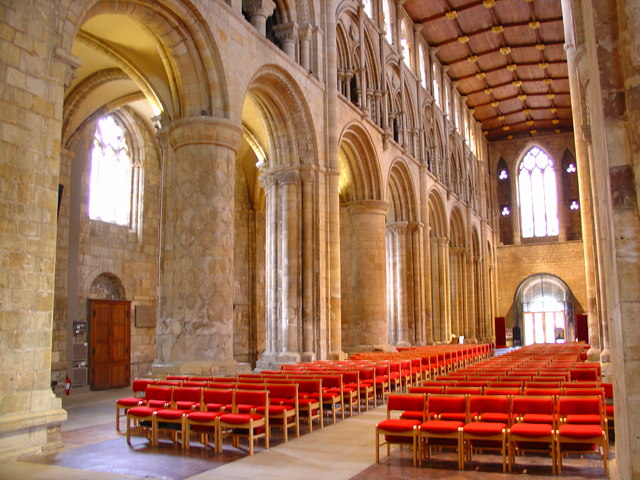
Selby Abbey in Yorkshire, Benedictine abbey, purchased by the town as a parish church

The local commissioners were instructed to ensure that, where portions of abbey churches were also used by local parishes or congregations, this use should continue. Parts of 117 former monasteries (of over 800) survived (and mostly still remain) in use for parochial worship, in addition to the fourteen former monastic churches that survived in their entirety as cathedrals. In around a dozen instances, wealthy benefactors purchased a complete former monastic church from the commissioners and presented it to their local community. Many other parishes bought and installed former monastic woodwork, choir stalls and stained-glass windows. As it was commonly the case by the late medieval period that the abbot's lodging had been expanded, these properties were frequently converted into country houses by lay purchasers. In other cases, such as Lacock Abbey and Forde Abbey, the conventual buildings themselves were converted to form the core of a Tudor great mansion.

Otherwise, the most marketable fabric in monastic buildings was likely to be the lead on roofs, gutters and plumbing, and buildings were burned down as the easiest way to extract this. Building stone and slate were sold off to the highest bidder. Many monastic outbuildings were turned into granaries, barns and stables. Thomas Cromwell had already instigated a campaign against "superstitions": pilgrimages and veneration of saints, during which ancient and precious valuables were grabbed and melted down, the tombs of saints and kings ransacked for whatever profit could be got from them, and their relics destroyed or dispersed. Even the crypt of King Alfred the Great was not spared. Great abbeys and priories like Glastonbury, Walsingham, Bury St Edmunds, and Shaftesbury, which had flourished as pilgrimage sites for many centuries, were soon reduced to ruins. However, the tales of widespread mob action resulting in destruction and iconoclasm partly confuses the looting spree of the 1530s with the vandalism wrought by the Puritans in the next century against the Anglican privileges.

Despite this, writer G.W.O. Woodward claimed:

There was no general policy of destruction, except in Lincolnshire where the local government agent was so determined that the monasteries should never be restored that he razed as many as he could to the ground. More often, the buildings have simply suffered from unroofing and neglect, or by quarrying.

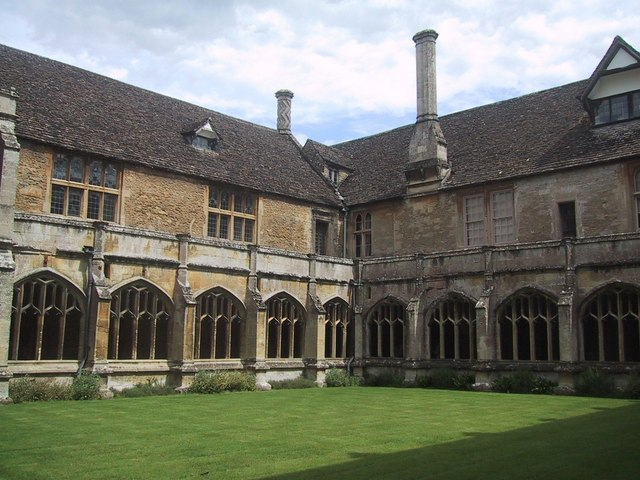
Lacock Abbey in Wiltshire, an Augustinian nunnery converted into an aristocratic mansion and country estate

Once the new and re-founded cathedrals and other endowments had been provided for, the Crown became richer to the extent of around £150,000 (equivalent to £120,423,300 in 2025), per year, although around £50,000 (equivalent to £40,141,100 in 2025) of this was initially committed to fund monastic pensions. Cromwell had intended that the bulk of this wealth should serve as regular income. After Cromwell's fall in 1540, Henry needed money quickly to fund his military ambitions in France and Scotland. Monastic property was sold off, representing by 1547 an annual value of £90,000 (equivalent to £65,095,000 in 2025). Lands and endowments were not offered for sale, let alone auctioned. Instead, the government responded to the flood of applications for purchase. Many applicants had been founders or patrons of the relevant houses and could expect to be successful. Purchasers were predominantly leading nobles, local magnates and gentry, people with no discernible religious tendency, other than a determination to maintain and extend their family's local status. The landed property of the former monasteries included large numbers of manorial estates, each carrying the right and duty to hold a court for tenants and others. Acquiring such feudal rights was regarded as essential to establish a family in the late medieval gentry. For a long period, freehold manorial estates had been very rare in the market, and families seized on the opportunity now offered to entrench their positions. Nothing would subsequently induce them to surrender their new acquisitions. The Court of Augmentations retained income sufficient to meet its continuing obligations to pay annual pensions; but as pensioners died off, or as pensions were extinguished when their holders accepted a royal appointment of higher value, then surplus property became available each year for further disposal. The last surviving monks continued to draw their pensions into the reign of James I (1603–1625), more than 60 years after the dissolution.

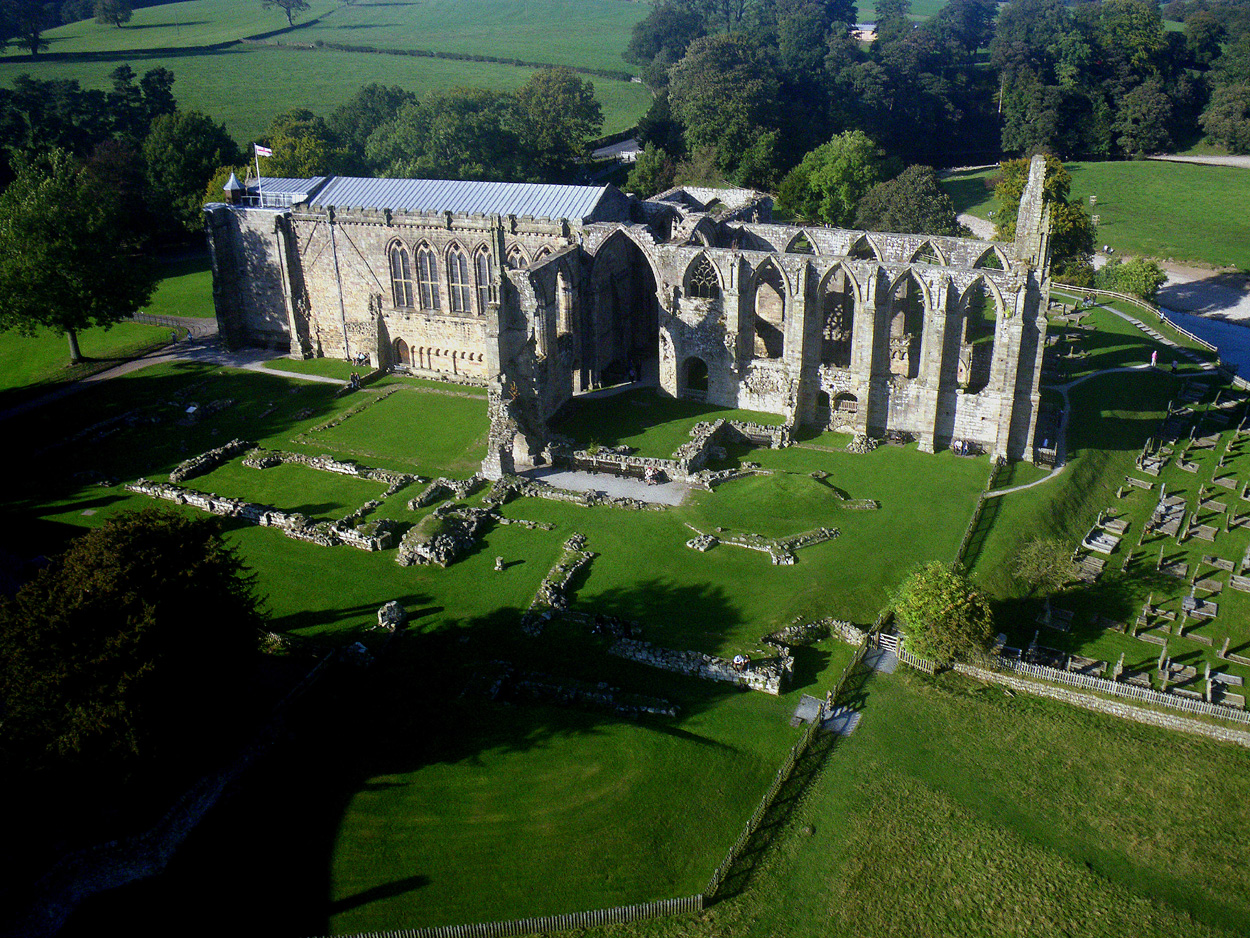
Bolton Abbey in Yorkshire, surviving parochial nave and ruined monastic choir

The dissolution did not greatly affect English parish church activity. Parishes that had formerly paid their tithes to a religious house now paid them to a lay impropriator, but rectors, vicars, and other incumbents remained in place. Congregations that had shared monastic churches continued to do so, with former monastic parts now walled off and derelict. Most parish churches had been endowed with chantries, each maintaining a stipended priest to say Mass, and these were unaffected. In addition, there remained over a hundred collegiate churches in England, whose endowments maintained regular choral worship through a corporate body of canons, prebends or priests. Most of these survived the reign of Henry VIII largely intact, only to be dissolved under the Chantries Act 1547, by Henry's son Edward VI, their property being absorbed into the Court of Augmentations and their members being added to the pensions list. Since many former monks had found employment as chantry priests, the consequence for these clerics was a double experience of dissolution, perhaps mitigated by the promise of a double pension.

== Ireland ==
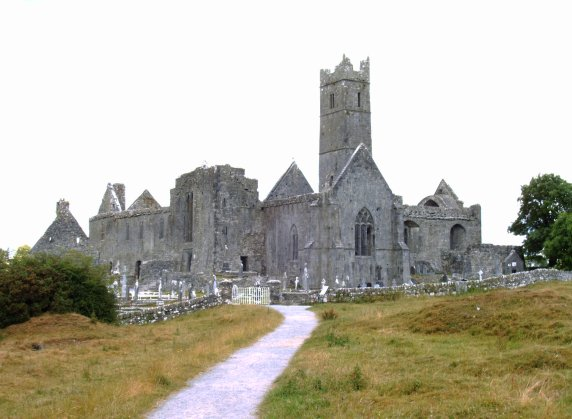
Quin Abbey, a Franciscan Friary built in the 15th century and suppressed in 1541

The dissolutions in Ireland followed a very different course from those in England and Wales. There were around 400 religious houses in Ireland in 1530—many more, relative to population and material wealth, than in England and Wales. In Ireland, the houses of friars had flourished in the 15th century, attracting popular support and financial endowments, undertaking many ambitious building schemes, and maintaining a regular conventual and spiritual life. Friaries constituted around half of the total number of religious houses. Irish monasteries, by contrast, had experienced a catastrophic decline in numbers, with few having more than six monks, such that by the 16th century only a minority maintained the daily observance of the Divine Office.

=== Henrican phase ===
Henry's direct authority, as Lord of Ireland and, from 1541, as King of Ireland, only extended to the area of the Pale immediately around Dublin. Outside this area, he could only proceed by tactical agreement with clan chiefs and local lords.

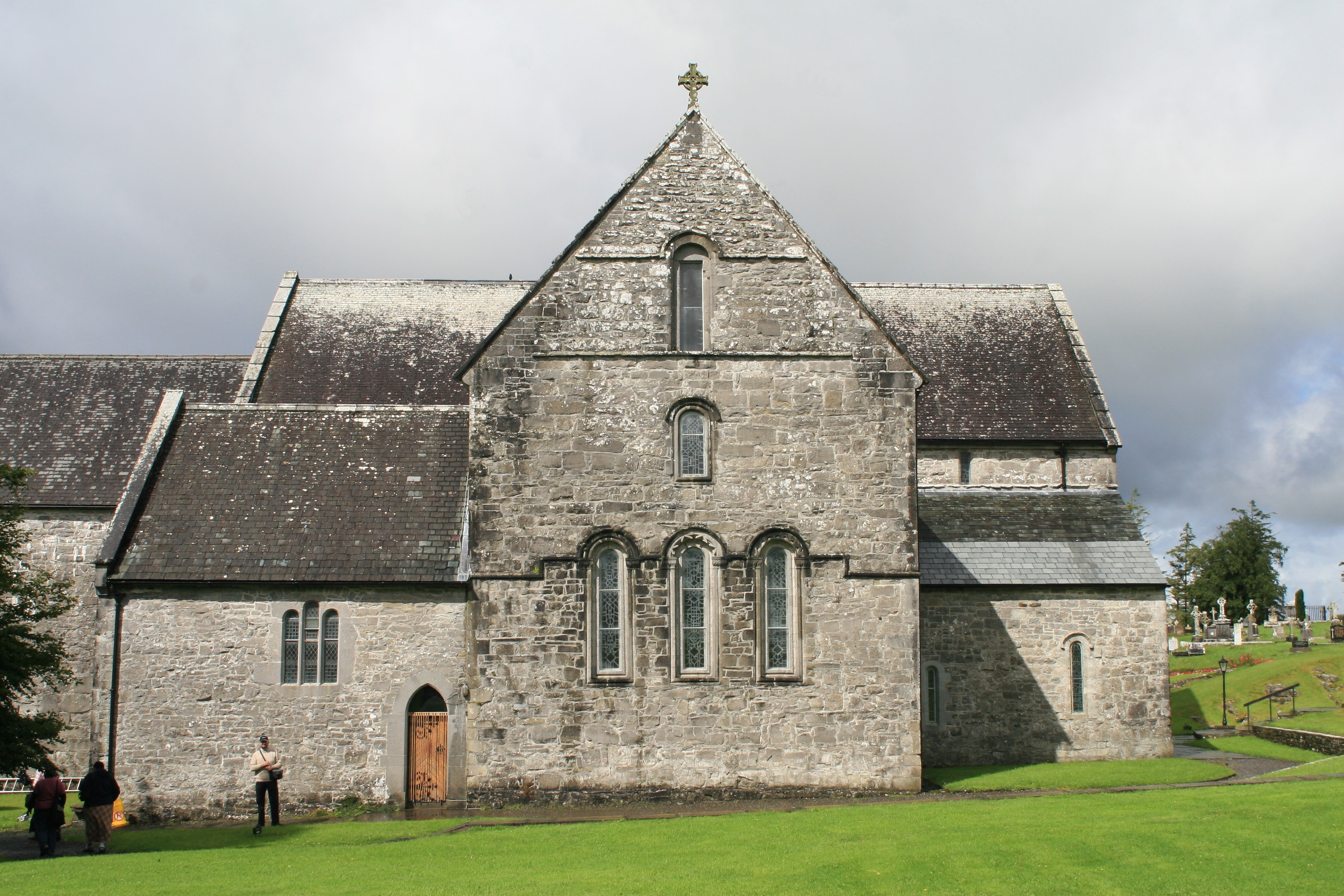
Ballintubber Abbey, An Augustinian priory founded in the 13th century, suppressed in 1603 and burned in 1653; but continually re-occupied and used for Catholic services, and re-roofed in the 20th century

Henry was determined to carry through a policy of consolidation and dissolution in Ireland—and in 1537 he introduced legislation into the Irish Parliament to legalise the closure of monasteries. The process faced considerable opposition, and only sixteen houses were suppressed. In 1539, he introduced a bill to close nine named monasteries: it was the only royal bill that year not passed. Henry remained resolute, and from 1541 as part of the Tudor conquest of Ireland he continued to press for more. For the most part, this involved making deals with local lords, under which monastic property was granted away in exchange for allegiance to the new Irish Crown. Henry acquired little (if any) of the wealth of the Irish houses.

Apart from taking land, plate and buildings, the dissolution effort involved considerable iconoclasm. Some monks and vestments from dissolved English monasteries found their way to Ireland. Some dissolved communities kept together, hiding in the country and mountains or discreetly re-possessing the former monastery, and appearing under the reign of Mary I.

=== Elizabethan phase ===
By the time of Henry's death (1547) around half of the Irish houses had been suppressed. Many continued to resist dissolution until the reign of Elizabeth I, which saw re-confiscations and also closures beyond the Pale in the Gaelic part of Ireland. According to historian Brenden Scott, vast tracts of property and land exchanged hands.

Catholics opened some new quasi-monastic communities to take in dissolved and would-be nuns. Several popular monasteries were saved by the local population. Some houses in the West of Ireland remained active until the early 17th century.

=== Puritan phase ===
In 1649, Oliver Cromwell led a Parliamentary army to conquer Ireland, and systematically sought out and destroyed former monastic houses. Subsequently, sympathetic landowners housed monks or friars close to several ruined religious houses, allowing them a continued covert existence during the 17th and 18th centuries, subject to the dangers of discovery and legal ejection or imprisonment.

== Consequences ==
=== Social and economic ===
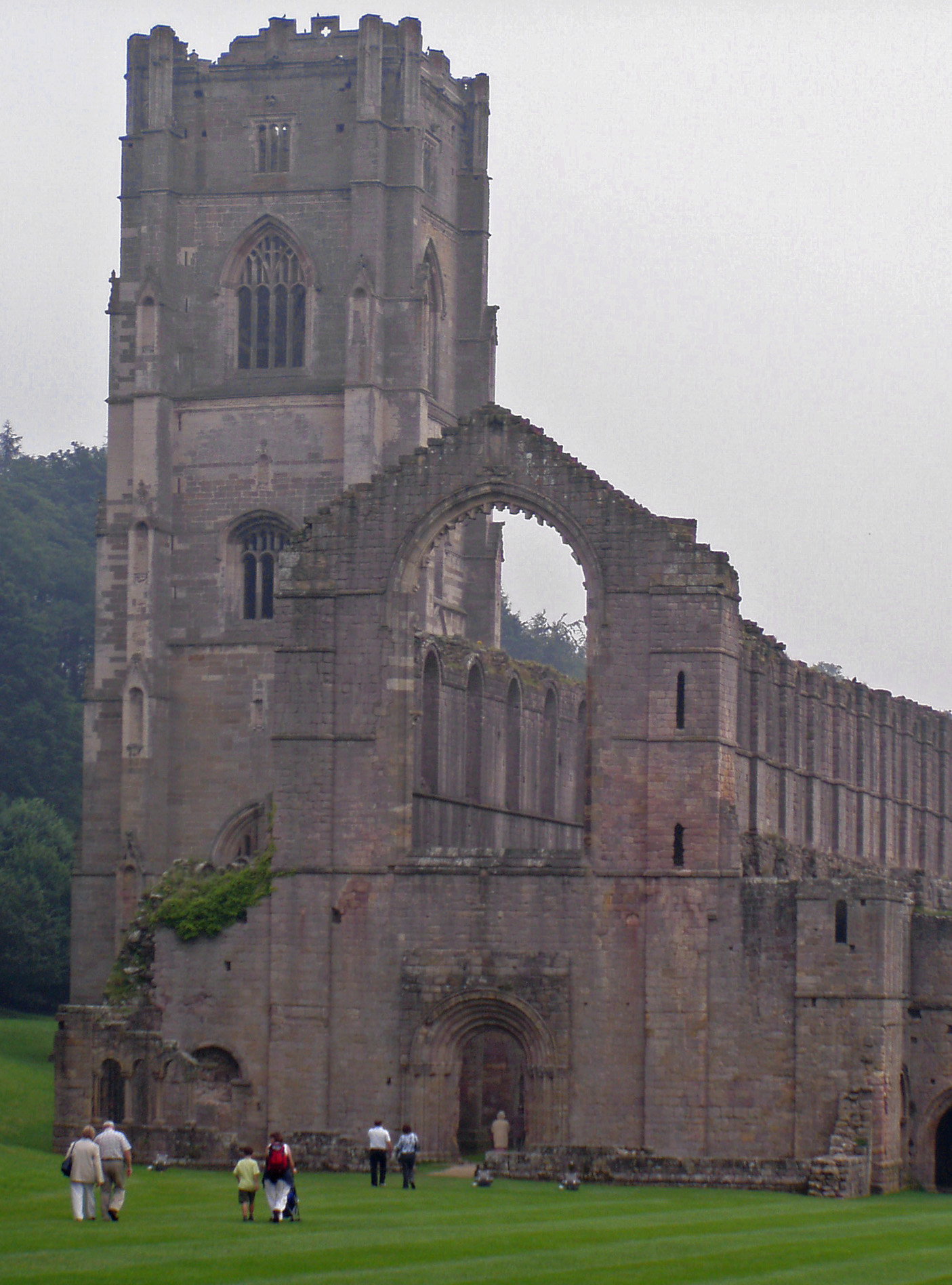
Ruins of Fountains Abbey, Yorkshire

The abbeys of England, Wales, and Ireland had been among the greatest landowners and the largest institutions in the kingdoms, although by the early 16th century, religious donors tended to favour parish churches, collegiate churches, university colleges and grammar schools, and these were now the predominant centres for learning and the arts. Nevertheless, particularly in rural areas, the abbeys, convents and priories were centres of hospitality and learning.

Monasteries had also supplied free food and alms for the poor, elderly, and destitute. The removal of over eight hundred such institutions left great gaps in the social fabric. According to political historian Gregory Slysz "The dissolution of the monasteries [...] brought social catastrophe to England" for the next 50 or so years, due to the closure of the numerous associated urban almshouses for poor relief and hospitals, worsened by spiraling inflation and a doubling of the population.

"But now that all the abbeys . . . be in temporal mennyes handes, I do not heare tell that one halpeny worth of alms or any other profight cometh vnto the peple of those parisshes."

— Henry Brinklow writing as Roderyck Mors (c.1544)

Slysz details the example of Westminster Abbey which had dwindled from 50 to 25 monks by the time of dissolution: 18 monks were given new positions, 7 were pensioned, the hundred or so servants were given no provision, and the Abbey's 1540 almsgiving of £400 that previously supported thousands of London poor, was replaced by a £100 annual grant for the new Westminister Cathedral to disburse, the almshouse itself going as low as £34. The failure to replace the alms system under the Tudors lead to the introduction of the Elizabethan Poor Law of 1601 and the start of workhouses.

Historians' assessments of the impact of the dissolution of monasteries on the poor have varied. Victorian economic historian William Ashley claimed that monastic poor relief was minimal, and this common view was summarised by author G. W. O. Woodward in 1974:

No great host of beggars was suddenly thrown on the roads for monastic charity had had only marginal significance and, even had the abbeys been allowed to remain, could scarcely have coped with the problems of unemployment and poverty created by the population and inflationary pressures of the middle and latter parts of the sixteenth century.

More recent revisionist scholarship has disputed this position, attributing it to a "confessional bias that came to dominate the historiography on monasticism", with historian Linda Colley writing of a "vast superstructure of prejudice."

About a quarter of net monastic wealth consisted of "spiritual" income arising where the religious house held the advowson (right to appoint) a benefice with the legal obligation to maintain the cure of souls in the parish, originally by nominating the rector and taking an annual rental payment. Over the medieval period, monasteries and priories continually sought papal exemptions, so as to personally use the glebe and tithe income of rectoral benefices in their possession. From the 13th century onwards, English diocesan bishops successfully established the principle that only the glebe and 'greater tithes' of grain, hay and wood could be appropriated by monastic patrons in this manner; the 'lesser tithes' had to remain within the parochial benefice, the incumbent of which carried the title of 'vicar'. By 1535, of 8,838 rectories, 3,307 had thus been appropriated with vicarages, but at this late date, a small sub-set of vicarages in monastic ownership were not being served by beneficed clergy at all. These were parish churches owned by houses of Augustinian or Premonstratensian canons, orders whose rules required them to provide parochial worship within their conventual churches. From the mid-14th century onwards, the canons had been able to exploit their hybrid status to justify petitions for papal privileges of appropriation, allowing them to fill vicarages in their possession either from among their own number, or from secular priests removable at will.

On the dissolution these spiritual income streams were sold off on the same basis as landed endowments, creating a new class of lay impropriators, who became entitled to patronage, and the income from tithes and glebe lands. Though as lay rectors, they had to maintain the fabric of the parish chancel. The existing rectors and vicars serving parish churches (formerly monastic property) were unaffected. However, in unclaimed canons' parish churches and chapels, the lay rector (as patron) was obliged to establish a stipend for a perpetual curate effectively from their own income

It is unlikely that the monastic system could have been broken simply by royal action, had there not been the overwhelming bait of enhanced status for gentry, and the convictions of the small but determined Protestant faction. Anti-clericalism was a familiar feature of late medieval Europe, producing its own strain of satiric literature that was aimed at a literate middle class.

=== Arts and culture ===
Along with the destruction of the monasteries, some centuries old, the destruction of their libraries was perhaps the greatest cultural loss caused by the English Reformation. Worcester Priory (now Worcester Cathedral) had 600 books at the time of the dissolution. Only six of them are known to have survived intact to the present day. At the abbey of the Augustinian Friars at York, a library of 646 volumes was destroyed, leaving only three known survivors. Some books were destroyed for their precious bindings, others were sold off by the cartload. The antiquarian John Leland was commissioned by the King to rescue items of particular interest (especially manuscript sources of Old English history), and other collections were made by private individuals, notably Matthew Parker. Nevertheless, much was lost, especially manuscript books of English church music, none of which had then been printed.

A great nombre of them whych purchased those supertycyous mansyons, resrved of those lybrarye bokes, some to serve theyr jakes, some to scoure candelstyckes, and some to rubbe their bootes. Some they solde to the grossers and soapsellers.

— John Bale, 1549

=== Health and education ===
The Suppression of Religious Houses Act 1539 also provided for the suppression of religious hospitals, which had constituted in England a distinct class of institution, endowed for the purpose of caring for older people. Very few of these, such as St Bartholomew's Hospital in London (which still exists, though it took a different name between 1546 and 1948), were exempted by special royal dispensation but most closed, their residents being discharged with small pensions.

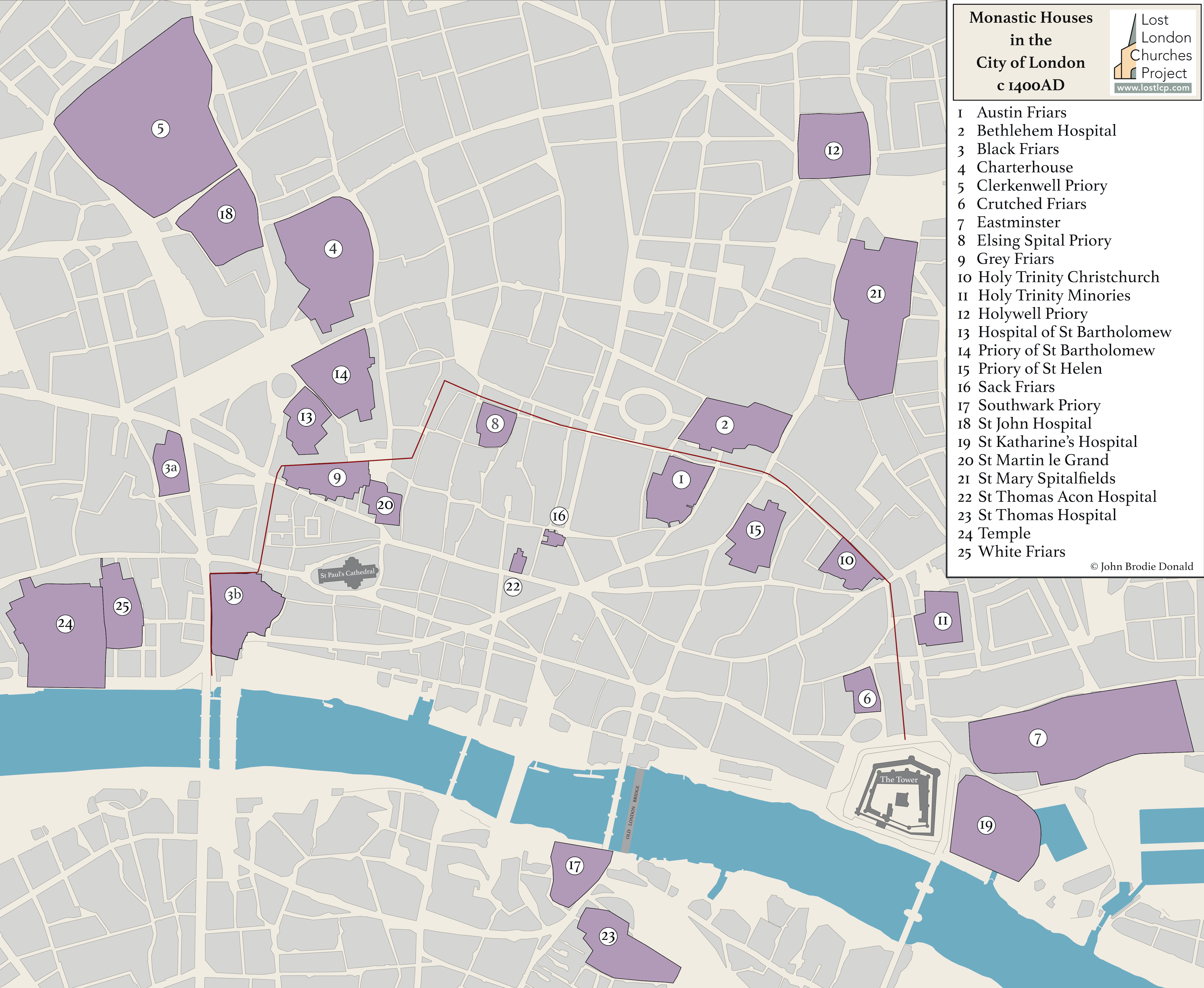
Lost monastic houses in the City of London

Monasteries had undertaken schooling for their novice members, which in the later medieval period had tended to extend to choristers and sometimes other younger scholars. Where monasteries had provided grammar schools for older scholars, these were commonly refounded with enhanced endowments; some by royal command in connection with the newly re-established cathedral churches, others by private initiative. Monastic orders had maintained, for the education of their members, six colleges at the universities of Oxford or Cambridge, of which five survived as refoundations. Hospitals too were frequently to be re-endowed by private benefactors; and many new almshouses and charities were to be founded by the Elizabethan gentry and professional classes (London Charterhouse/Charterhouse School being an example which still survives). Nevertheless, it has been estimated that only in 1580 did overall levels of charitable giving in England return to those before the dissolution. On the eve of the overthrow, the various monasteries owned approximately 2,000,000 acres (8,100 km^{2}), over 16 per cent of England, with tens of thousands of tenant farmers working those lands, some of whom had family ties to a particular monastery.

=== Religion ===
It has been argued that the suppression of the English monasteries and nunneries contributed to the spreading decline of a contemplative spirituality which once thrived in Europe, with the occasional exception found only in groups such as the Society of Friends ("Quakers"). This may be set against the retained and newly established cathedrals of the daily singing of the Divine Office by choristers and vicars choral, now undertaken as public worship, which had not been the case before the dissolution. The deans and prebends of the six new cathedrals were overwhelmingly former heads of religious houses. The secularised former monks and friars commonly looked for re-employment as parish clergy; and consequently, numbers of new ordinations dropped drastically in the ten years after the dissolution and ceased almost entirely in the reign of Edward VI. It was only in 1549, after Edward came to the throne, that former monks and nuns were permitted to marry. Within a year of permission being granted, only around a quarter had done so, only to find themselves forcibly separated (and denied their pensions) in the reign of Mary. On the succession of Elizabeth, these former monks and friars (reunited both with their wives and their pensions) formed a major part of the new Anglican church and may properly claim credit for maintaining the religious life of the country until a new generation of ordinands became available in the 1560s and 1570s.

In the medieval church, there had been no seminaries or other institutions dedicated to training men as parish clergy. An aspiring candidate for ordination, having acquired a grammar school education and appropriate experience, would have been presented to the bishop's commissary for examination. Candidates were sponsored by an ecclesiastical corporation which provided him with a 'title', a notional patrimony assuring the bishop of his financial security. By the 16th century, the sponsors were overwhelmingly religious houses, although monasteries provided no formal parochial training, and the financial 'title' was a legal fiction. With the rapid expansion of grammar school provision in the late medieval period, the numbers of men being presented each year for ordination greatly exceeded the number of benefices falling vacant through the death of the incumbent priest. Consequently most newly ordained parish clergy could only expect to succeed to a benefice after many years as a Mass priest of low social standing.

In the knowledge that alternative arrangements for sponsorship and title would now need to be made, the dissolution legislation provided that the lay and ecclesiastical successors of the monks in former monastic endowments could provide valid title for ordinands. These new arrangements appear to have taken a considerable period to gain acceptance, and the circumstances of the church in the late 1530s may not have encouraged candidates to come forward. For 20 years afterwards (until the succession of Elizabeth I), the number of ordinands in every diocese in England and Wales fell drastically. At the same time, the restrictions on 'pluralism' introduced through legislation in 1529 prevented the accumulation of multiple benefices by individual clergy, and accordingly by 1559 some 10% of benefices were vacant and former reserve Mass priests had been absorbed into the ranks of beneficed clergy. Monastic successors preferred to sponsor university graduates as candidates for the priesthood; and, although the government failed to respond to the consequent need for expanded educational provision, individual benefactors stepped into the breach, with the refoundation as university colleges of five out of the six former monastic colleges of Oxford and Cambridge. Jesus College, Oxford and Emmanuel College, Cambridge were newly founded with the express purpose of educating a Protestant parish clergy. One unintended long-term consequence of the dissolution was the transformation of the parish clergy in England and Wales into an educated professional class of secure, beneficed incumbents of distinctly higher social standing. Through intermarriage of one another's children, this social group became substantially self-perpetuating.

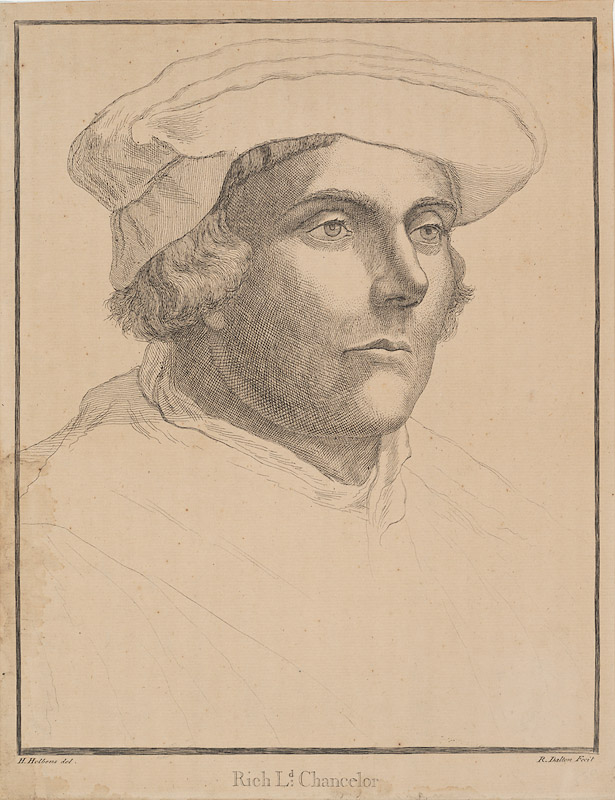
Richard Rich, first chancellor of the Court of Augmentations, established to manage the endowments of former monasteries and pay pensions

Even while it had been stated that King's increased riches would make it possible to build or better fund religious, philanthropic, and educational institutions, only around 15% of the monastic money was used this way. This included refounding eight out of nine previous monastic cathedrals (Coventry being the exception), as well as six completely new bishoprics (Bristol, Chester, Gloucester, Oxford, Peterborough, Westminster) with their associated cathedrals, chapters, choirs, and grammar schools; refounding monastic institutions at Brecon, Thornton, and Burton on Trent as secular colleges; endowing five Regius Professorships at the universities of Oxford and Cambridge; the endowment of the colleges of Trinity College, Cambridge, and Christ Church, Oxford; and the maritime charity of Trinity House. Thomas Cranmer objected to the provision of the new cathedrals with complete chapters of prebendaries at high stipends, but against pressure to ensure that well-paid posts would continue, his protests had no effect. On the other hand, Cranmer ensured that the new grammar schools attached both to 'New Foundation' and 'Old Foundation' cathedrals should be well funded, and accessible to boys from all walks of life. The Court of Augmentations retained around a third of the overall monastic income since it was necessary to continue making pension payments to former monks and nuns. Just over half of the remaining property was left to be offered for sale at market prices (Henry gave away very little property to favoured staff, and what he did give away tended to return to the Crown after its beneficiaries fell out of favour and were charged with treason). The English and Welsh dissolutions produced a comparatively small amount of new educational endowments compared to the violent closure of monasteries elsewhere in Protestant Europe, but the treatment of former monks and nuns was more benevolent, and there was no analogue to the mechanisms established in England to maintain pension payments over successive decades.

=== Politics ===
The dissolution and destruction of the monasteries and shrines was very unpopular in many areas. In the north of England, centring on Yorkshire and Lincolnshire, the suppression led to a popular rising, the Pilgrimage of Grace, that threatened the Crown for some weeks. In 1536, there were major, popular uprisings in Lincolnshire and Yorkshire and a further rising in Norfolk the following year. James Clark claims in The Dissolution of the Monasteries:

The Lincolnshire rising lasted less than a week but before its end their cause was carried across the county's northern border. Now, there were copycat musterings passing up through Yorkshire as far as Northumberland, and to the west as far as the gateway into Wales.

There were rumours that the King would tax livestock and calves in addition to stripping parish churches. The rebels demanded that Cromwell be removed and that the monasteries remain untouched. Henry used promises to calm the unrest before swiftly beheading some of the leaders.

When Henry VIII's Catholic daughter, Mary I, succeeded to the throne in 1553, her hopes for a revival of English religious life proved a failure. Westminster Abbey, which had been retained as a cathedral, reverted to being a monastery; while the communities of the Bridgettine nuns and of the Observant Franciscans, which had gone into exile in the reign of Henry VIII, returned to their former houses at Syon and Greenwich respectively. A small group of fifteen surviving Carthusians was re-established in their old house at Sheen, as were eight Dominican canonesses in Dartford. A house of Dominican friars was established at Smithfield, but this was only possible through importing professed religious from Holland and Spain, and Mary's hopes of further refoundations foundered, as she found it very difficult to persuade former monks and nuns to resume the religious life. Schemes for restoring the abbeys at Glastonbury and St Albans failed for lack of volunteers. All the refounded houses were in properties that had remained in Crown possession. None of Mary's lay supporters would co-operate in returning their holdings of monastic lands to religious use. Lay lords in Parliament proved unremittingly hostile, as a revival of the "mitred" abbeys would have returned the House of Lords to having an ecclesiastical majority. There remained a widespread suspicion that the return of religious communities to their former premises might unsettle the legal title of lay purchasers of monastic land, and accordingly all Mary's foundations were technically new communities in law. In 1554, Cardinal Pole the papal legate, negotiated a papal dispensation allowing the new owners to retain the former monastic lands, and in return Parliament enacted the heresy laws in January 1555.

When Mary died in 1558 and was succeeded by her half-sister, Elizabeth I, five of the six revived communities left again to exile in continental Europe. An Act of Elizabeth's first parliament dissolved the refounded houses. But although Elizabeth offered to allow the monks in Westminster to remain in place with restored pensions if they took the Oath of Supremacy and conformed to the new Book of Common Prayer, all refused and dispersed unpensioned. In less than 20 years, the monastic impulse had effectively been extinguished in England; and was only revived, even amongst Catholics, in the very different form of Counter-Reformation orders, such as the Jesuits.

It led to the loss of the royal remains of Alfred the Great, Æthelstan, Henry I of England, Stephen, King of England and Richard III of England.

== See also ==
- Cestui que
- Charter of Liberties
- Compendium Compertorum
- Dissolution (Sansom novel)
- List of monasteries dissolved by Henry VIII of England
- Little Jack Horner, a children's rhyme allegedly based on the episode.
- Religion in the United Kingdom

== Bibliography ==
- Andersson, Erika; Jörälv, Lennart (2003). Reliker och mirakel. Den heliga Birgitta och Vadstena (in Swedish). Stockholm: Wahlström & Widstrand.
- Baskerville, Geoffrey (1937). English Monks and the Suppression of the Monasteries. New Haven, Connecticut: Yale University Press.
- Bernard, G. W. (October 2011). "The Dissolution of the Monasteries". History. 96 (324): 390–409. doi:10.1111/j.1468-229X.2011.00526.x.
- Borman, Tracy (2014). Thomas Cromwell : the untold story of Henry VIII's most faithful servant. Hodder & Stoughton. ISBN 9781444782875.
- Bradshaw, Brendan (1974). The Dissolution of the Religious Orders in Ireland under Henry VIII. London: Cambridge University Press.
- Bucholz, R. O.; Key, N. (2009). Early Modern England 1485–1714: a narrative history (2nd ed.). Chichester: Wiley-Blackwell. ISBN 978-1-4051-6275-3.
- Carley, James P. (December 1997). "Marks in Books and the Libraries of Henry VIII". The Papers of the Bibliographical Society of America. 91 (4): 583–606. doi:10.1086/pbsa.91.4.24304797. S2CID 164047873.
- Clark, James G. (2021). The Dissolution of the Monasteries: A New History. London. ISBN 978-0-300-26418-0. OCLC 1273001858.
- Cornwall, J.C.K. (1988). Wealth and Society in Early Sixteenth-Century England. Cambridge: Cambridge University Press.
- Dickens, A. G. (1989). The English Reformation (2nd ed.). London: B. T. Batsford.
- Duffy, Eamon (1992). The Stripping of the Altars: Traditional Religion in England, 1400–1580. New Haven, Connecticut: Yale University Press. ISBN 0-300-06076-9.
- Erler, Mary.C. (2013). Reading and Writing During the Dissolution. Cambridge University Press.
- Gasquet, F. A. (1925). Henry VIII and the English Monasteries (8th ed.). London.
- Haigh, Christopher (1969). The Last Days of the Lancashire Monasteries and the Pilgrimage of Grace. Manchester: Manchester University Press for Chetham Society.
- Heale, M. R. V. (2004). "Dependent Priories and the Closure of Monasteries in Late Medieval England, 1400–1535". The English Historical Review. 119 (480): 1–26. doi:10.1093/ehr/119.480.1. JSTOR 3489997.
- Keen, Laurence (1999). Studies in the Early History of Shaftesbury Abbey. Dorchester: Dorset County Council. ISBN 9780852168875.
- Knowles, David (1955). The Religious Orders in England. Vol. II. Cambridge University Press.
- Knowles, David (1959). The Religious Orders in England. Vol. III. Cambridge University Press.
- MacCulloch, Diarmaid (2018). Thomas Cromwell: A Life. Allen Lane. ISBN 9781846144295.
- Marshall, Peter (2017). Heretics and Believers: A History of the English Reformation. New Haven: Yale University Press. ISBN 978-0-300-17062-7. OCLC 961308356.
- Murray, Stuart (2009). The Library: An Illustrated History. Skyhorse Publishing.
- Rex, Richard (2014). "The Religion of Henry VIII". The Historical Journal. 57 (1): 1–32. doi:10.1017/S0018246X13000368. JSTOR 24528908.
- Salter, M. (2010). Medieval English Friaries. Malvern: Folly Publications. ISBN 978-1-871731-87-3.
- Savine, Alexander (1909). English Monasteries on the Eve of the Dissolution. Oxford: The Clarendon Press.
- Scarisbrick, J. J. (1968). Henry VIII. University of California Press.
- Thomson, Gladys Scott (1933). "Woburn Abbey and the Dissolution of the Monasteries". Transactions of the Royal Historical Society. 16: 129–160. doi:10.2307/3678667. JSTOR 3678667.
- White, Newport B. (1943). Extents of Irish Monastic possessions 1540–1. Dublin: Irish Manuscripts Commission.
- Willmott, Hugh (2020). The Dissolution of the Monasteries in England and Wales. Sheffield: Equinox Publishing.
- Woodward, G.W.O. (1974). The Dissolution of the Monasteries. London: Pitkin Pictorials Ltd. Concentrates on England and Wales.
- Youings, J. (1971). The Dissolution of the Monasteries. London: Allen and Unwin.
