= Suppression of Religious Houses Act 1539 =

Act of the Parliament of England

Suppression of Religious Houses Act 1539 (Note: The citation of this act by this short title was authorised by section 5 of, and the second schedule to, the Statute Law Revision Act 1948. Due to the repeal of those provisions, it is now authorised by section 19(2) of the Interpretation Act 1978.)
- Act of Parliament
- Parliament of England
- Long title: An Acte for dissolucion of the Abbeys. (Note: These words are printed against this act in the second column of the second schedule to the Statute Law Revision Act 1948, which is headed "Title".)
- Citation: 31 Hen. 8. c. 13
- Territorial extent: England and Wales

Dates
- Royal assent: 28 June 1539
- Commencement: 28 April 1539 (Note: Start of session.)
- Repealed: 16 November 1989
Other legislation
Repealed by	Statute Law (Repeals) Act 1969; Statute Law (Repeals) Act 1989
Relates to	Suppression of Religious Houses Act 1535

Status: Repealed

Text of statute as originally enacted

The Suppression of Religious Houses Act 1539 (31 Hen. 8. c. 13), sometimes referred to as the Second Act of Dissolution or as the Act for the Dissolution of the Greater Monasteries, was an act of the Parliament of England that provided for the dissolution of 552 monasteries and houses remaining after the Suppression of Religious Houses Act 1535 (27 Hen. 8. c. 28).

== Subsequent developments ==
The whole act, except section 19, was repealed by section 1 of, and part II of the schedule to, the Statute Law (Repeals) Act 1969, which came into force on 1 January 1970.

Section 19 of the act was repealed by section 1(1) of, and part VIII of schedule 1 to, the Statute Law (Repeals) Act 1989, which came into force on 16 November 1989. The Law Commission and Scottish Law Commission had advised that section 19 was "spent".

== See also ==
- Dissolution of the Monasteries
- Suppression of Religious Houses Act 1535
