= Suppression of Religious Houses Act 1535 =

Act of the Parliament of England

Suppression of Religious Houses Act 1535 (Note: The citation of this act by this short title was authorised by section 5 of, and the second schedule to, the Statute Law Revision Act 1948. Due to the repeal of those provisions, it is now authorised by section 19(2) of the Interpretation Act 1978.)
- Act of Parliament
- Parliament of England
- Long title: An Acte wherby all Relygeous Houses of Monkes Chanons and Nonnes whiche may not dyspend Manors Landes Tenementes & Heredytaments above the clere yerly Value of ii C li (Note: £200) are geven to the Kinges Highnes his Heires and Successours for ever. (Note: These words are printed against this act in the second column of the second schedule to the Statute Law Revision Act 1948, which is headed "Title".)
- Citation: 27 Hen. 8. c. 28
- Territorial extent: England and Wales

Dates
- Royal assent: 14 April 1536
- Commencement: 4 February 1536 (Note: Start of session.)
- Repealed: 1 January 1970

Other legislation
- Repealed by: Continuance, etc. of Laws Act 1623; Statute Law Revision Act 1948; Statute Law (Repeals) Act 1969
- Relates to: Suppression of Religious Houses Act 1539

Status: Repealed

Text of statute as originally enacted

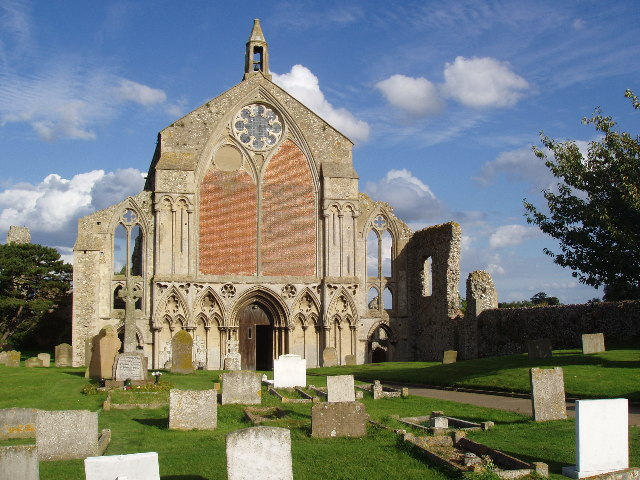
Ruins of Binham Priory, a house suppressed by the Act

The Suppression of Religious Houses Act 1535 (27 Hen. 8. c. 28), also referred to as the Act for the Dissolution of the Lesser Monasteries and as the Dissolution of Lesser Monasteries Act 1535, was an act of the Parliament of England enacted by the English Reformation Parliament in February 1535/36. It was the beginning of the legal process by which King Henry VIII set about the dissolution of the monasteries.

== Background ==
From the 14th century onwards, several popes had granted licences for the suppression of religious houses in England. In 1528 Cardinal Wolsey sequestrated Rumburgh Priory for funds to build his college at Ipswich.

The breakdown of relations between Henry VIII and the Church in Rome, prompted by his marriage to Anne Boleyn, resulted in the Statute in Restraint of Appeals of 1533, forbidding all appeals to the Pope in Rome on religious or other matters. Pope Clement VII responded by announcing Henry's provisional excommunication, and the hostility between the king and the pope escalated. In the words of John Burton's Monasticon Eboracense (1758) –

The casting off the Pope's Supremacy, and the Monks being looked on only as a sort of half-subjects, ever ready to join any foreign power, which should invade the nation, whilst the King was excommunicated by the Pope... together with the alienation of the lesser houses, were urged for seizing the rest; to which the King's want of a large supply, and the people's willingness to save their own pockets, greatly contributed; and accordingly, a motion shortly after was made in Parliament, that, to support the King's state, and supply his wants, all the religious houses might be conferred upon the Crown, which were not able to expend clearly above 200l. per annum. This Act was passed about March, A. D. 1535.

One of the first practical results of the assumption of the highest spiritual powers by the king was the supervision by royal decree of the ordinary episcopal visitations, and the appointment of a layman — Thomas Cromwell — as the king's vicar-general in spirituals, with special authority to visit the monastic houses, and to bring them into line with the new order of things. A document, dated 21 January 1535, allows Cromwell to conduct the visit through "commissaries", as the minister is said to be at that time too busy with "the affairs of the whole kingdom." The men employed by Cromwell were chiefly Richard Layton and Thomas Leigh. The visitation seems to have been conducted systematically, and to have passed through three clearly defined stages. During the summer the houses in the West of England were subjected to examination; and this portion of the work came to an end in September, when Layton and Leigh arrived at Oxford and Cambridge respectively. In October and November the visitors changed the field of their labours to the eastern and south-eastern districts; and in December we find Layton advancing through the midland counties to Lichfield, where he met Leigh, who had finished his work in the religious houses of Huntingdon and Lincolnshire. Thence they proceeded together to the north, and the city of York was reached on 11 January 1536. But with all their haste, to which they were urged by Cromwell, they had not proceeded very far in the work of their northern inspection before the meeting of Parliament.

Parliament met on 4 February 1535/36 and received a digest of the report Valor Ecclesiasticus, a visitation of the monasteries of England commissioned by the King. Cromwell was then defeated in Parliament, with his plan to reform monasteries denied, and the Dissolution of the Monasteries, put forward by Thomas Audley, soon passed the Act.

The act applied only to lesser houses "which have not in lands, tenements, rents, tithes, portions, and other hereditaments, above the clear yearly value of two hundred pounds", attacking such houses as dens of iniquity and proposing that those in them should be "committed to great and honourable monasteries of religion" and "compelled to live religiously".

== Preamble ==
The preamble of the act states –

FORASMUCH as manifest sin, vicious, carnal and abominable living is daily used and committed among the little and small abbeys, priories, and other religious houses of monks, canons, and nuns, where the congregation of such religious persons is under the number of twelve persons, whereby the governors of such religious houses, and their convent, spoil, destroy, consume, and utterly waste, as well their churches, monasteries, priories, principal houses, farms, granges, lands, tenements, and hereditaments, as the ornaments of their churches, and their goods and chattels, to the high displeasure of Almighty God, slander of good religion, and to the great infamy of the king's highness and the realm, if redress should not be had thereof. And albeit that many continual visitations hath been heretofore had, by the space of two hundred years and more, for an honest and charitable reformation of such unthrifty, carnal, and abominable living, yet nevertheless little or none amendment is hitherto had, but their vicious living shamelessly increases and augments, and by a cursed custom so rooted and infected, that a great multitude of the religious persons in such small houses do rather choose to rove abroad in apostasy, than to conform themselves to the observation of good religion; so that without such small houses be utterly suppressed, and the religious persons therein committed to great and honourable monasteries of religion in this realm, where they may be compelled to live religiously, for reformation of their lives, there can else be no redress nor reformation in that behalf.

== Effect ==
The main effect of the act was to expropriate the lesser religious houses to the King, who (in the words of the act) "shall have to him and to his heirs all and singular such monasteries, abbeys, and priories, which at any time within one year next before the making of this Act have been given and granted to his majesty by any abbot, prior, abbess, or prioress, under their convent seals, or that otherwise have been suppressed or dissolved... to have and to hold all and singular the premises, with all their rights, profits, jurisdictions, and commodities, unto the king's majesty, and his heirs and assigns for ever, to do and use therewith his and their own wills, to the pleasure of Almighty God, and to the honour and profit of this realm".

This section includes a retrospective effect, regularising suppressions of houses which had already taken place.

== Consequences ==
The act, and the many dissolutions which followed in its wake, was the principal cause of the Pilgrimage of Grace, a rebellion which broke out at Louth in Lincolnshire in October 1536. An army numbering about 30,000 men gathered, and King Henry ordered the Duke of Norfolk, Duke of Suffolk, and Lord Shrewsbury to take action. But he had no standing army, and the rebels were looked on favourably. So peace had to be negotiated, the demand to restore the monasteries was conceded, a new parliament was to be called, and the rebels were promised free pardons. After they had dispersed and gone home, Henry broke his word. The rebel leaders were arrested and put on trial, and several hundred were executed. Bigod's rebellion then followed, also unsuccessful.

== Subsequent developments ==
Sections 17 and 18 of the act were repealed by section 11 of the Continuance, etc. of Laws Act 1623 (21 Jas. 1. c. 28), which came into force on 19 February 1624.

Sections 4–6, 8–12, and 14 of the act were repealed by section 1 of, and the first schedule to, the Statute Law Revision Act 1948 (11 & 12 Geo. 6. c. 62), which came into force on 30 July 1948.

The whole act, so far as unrepealed, was repealed by section 1 of, and part II of the schedule to, the Statute Law (Repeals) Act 1969, which came into force on 1 January 1970.

== See also ==
- Dissolution of the Monasteries
- List of monasteries dissolved by Henry VIII of England
- Suppression of Religious Houses Act 1539
